= Ligota-Panewniki =

District of Katowice

- Katowice District
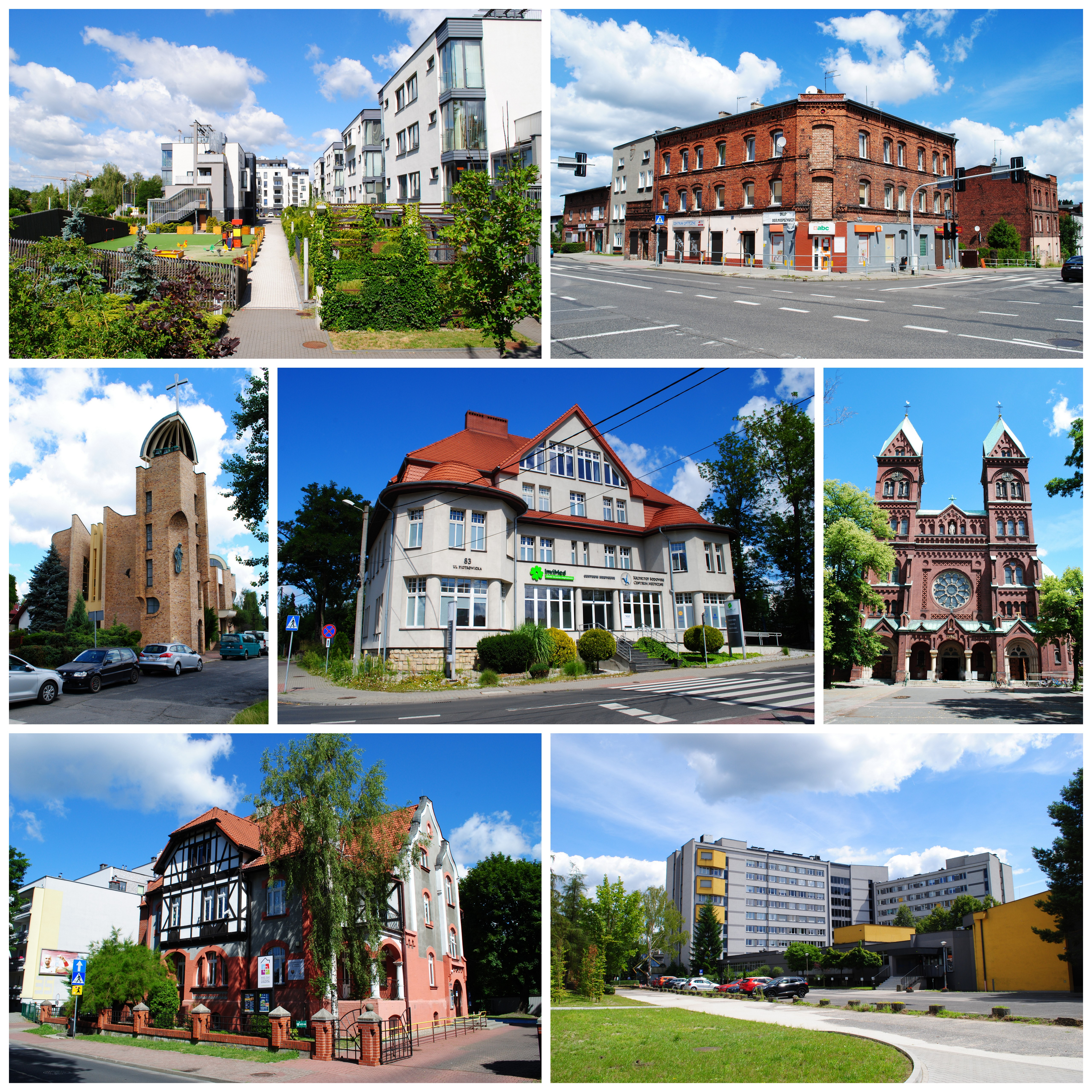
- Osiedle Książęce, apartment buildings at the corner of Panewnicka and Kijowska streets in Panewniki, Church of Our Lady of the Rosary in Zadole, former town hall of Gmina Ligota, Basilica of St. Louis the King and the Assumption of Mary in Panewniki, seat of Ligota Municipal Cultural Center at Franciszkańska Street in Ligota, Kornel Gibiński University Clinical Center of the Medical University of Silesia at 14 Medyków Street

- Location of Ligota-Panewniki within Katowice
- Coordinates: 50°13′36.79″N 18°57′45.38″E
- Country: Poland
- Voivodeship: Silesian
- County/City: Katowice
- Established: 1 January 1992

Area
  - Total: 12.59 km^{2} (4.86 sq mi)
- Elevation: 245–285 m (804–935 ft)

Population (2020)
  - Total: 28,286
  - Density: 2,247/km^{2} (5,819/sq mi)
- Time zone: UTC+1 (CET)
  - Summer (DST): UTC+2 (CEST)
- Area code: (+48) 032
- Vehicle registration: SK
- Primary airport: Katowice Airport
- Website: district portal dedicated to serve Ligota, Panewniki, Zadole, Kokociniec and Wymysłów districts

Ligota-Panewniki (German: Ellgoth-Panewnik; also "Idaweiche") is a district of Katowice in Poland, located in the western part of the city, by the Kłodnica river. It borders two other districts: Załęska Hałda-Brynów and Piotrowice-Ochojec, as well as the cities of Ruda Śląska (Kochłowice and Halemba districts) and Mikołów. The district consists of two parts of the city, which were formerly separate gminas: Ligota (the eastern part of the district; Nowa Ligota and part of Stara Ligota) and Panewniki (the western part of the district; Nowe Panewniki, Kokociniec, Wymysłów, and Stare Panewniki), as well as the northern part of Zadole (a former hamlet of Piotrowice).

Ligota was first mentioned in 1360, while Panewniki was founded in the 16th century. For a time, Ligota was an abandoned village, as indicated by chronicles from the 16th century and the first half of the 17th century. By the end of the 17th century, it was resettled, and two hamlets of Panewniki, Kokociniec and Wymysłów, were established in the same century. A hammer mill was also opened in the former, which operated until the mid-18th century. Ligota and Panewniki were typically agricultural settlements until the 19th century, when both villages also became summer resorts for the residents of Katowice, thanks in part to the construction of a railway passing through Ligota in 1851. Zadole was founded in the 19th century, and recreational areas were established there along the Ślepotka stream, within which Zadole Park was later built. A monastery complex was erected in Panewniki between 1905 and 1908, including a Romanesque Revival church elevated to the rank of minor basilica in 1974. In 1924, Ligota was incorporated into Katowice.

In the interwar years, a complex of civil servant housing was built in Nowa Ligota in International Style, and after World War II, a socialist realist housing estate was constructed in the vicinity. Panewniki was incorporated into Katowice in 1951. During the Polish People's Republic, new multi-family buildings were constructed in Kokociniec and Zadole, among other places, and the Sadyba housing estate was built at the turn of the 1980s and 1990s. The Ligota-Panewniki district was formally established on 1 January 1992, and during the period of economic and political transformation, some of the enterprises operating there were restructured or liquidated. A number of new residential developments were also built there, the largest of which are Osiedle Książęce and Osiedle Franciszkańskie.

In September 1939, Panewniki was one of the sites of large massacres of Polish defenders of Katowice, carried out by the Germans following the invasion of Poland, which started World War II (see Nazi crimes against the Polish nation). During the subsequent German occupation, the occupiers operated two forced labour camps in Ligota: one for Poles (Polenlager), and one for Jews.

Ligota-Panewniki is a multifunctional district with a predominance of residential and local service functions, and is also home to businesses in various industries. In addition, it serves educational, healthcare, and religious functions. Three hospitals are located there: the Kornel Gibiński University Clinical Center (one of two facilities) and the Upper Silesian Children's Health Center, both belonging to the Medical University of Silesia, as well as the Regional Railway Hospital. The Roman Catholic Church has a significant presence in the district – the seat of the Province of the Assumption of Mary of the Order of Friars Minor is located there, and the Congregation of the Sisters Servants of the Immaculate Conception of the Blessed Virgin Mary also has its provincial house there. The Ligota Municipal Cultural Center, one of the district's most important cultural institutions, is home to theater groups such as Kabaret Mumio and Gry i Ludzie Theatre, while Student House No. 1 houses a radio studio for Radio Egida.

Ligota-Panewniki is famous due to the magnificent Franciscan Basilica, the headquarters of the Franciscan Assumption Province in Poland. During Christmas the church becomes a religious and tourist attraction due to its Christmas Nativity scene, which supposedly is the biggest in Europe.

No trunk or voivodeship roads run through the district; the main streets include: Panewnicka, Piotrowicka, and Kłodnicka. The Katowice Ligota railway station is one of the major railway hubs in the city, where railways Katowice–Zwardoń, Katowice Ligota–Gliwice, Katowice Ligota–Tychy, and Katowice Ligota–KWK Wujek intersect. Ligota-Panewniki is the largest district of Katowice after Murcki, and as of the end of 2020, it was also the most populous. The district covers an area of 12.59 km² (7.64% of the city's area), and at the end of 2020, it had a population of 28,286 (10.38% of Katowice's population).

== Geography ==
=== Location ===
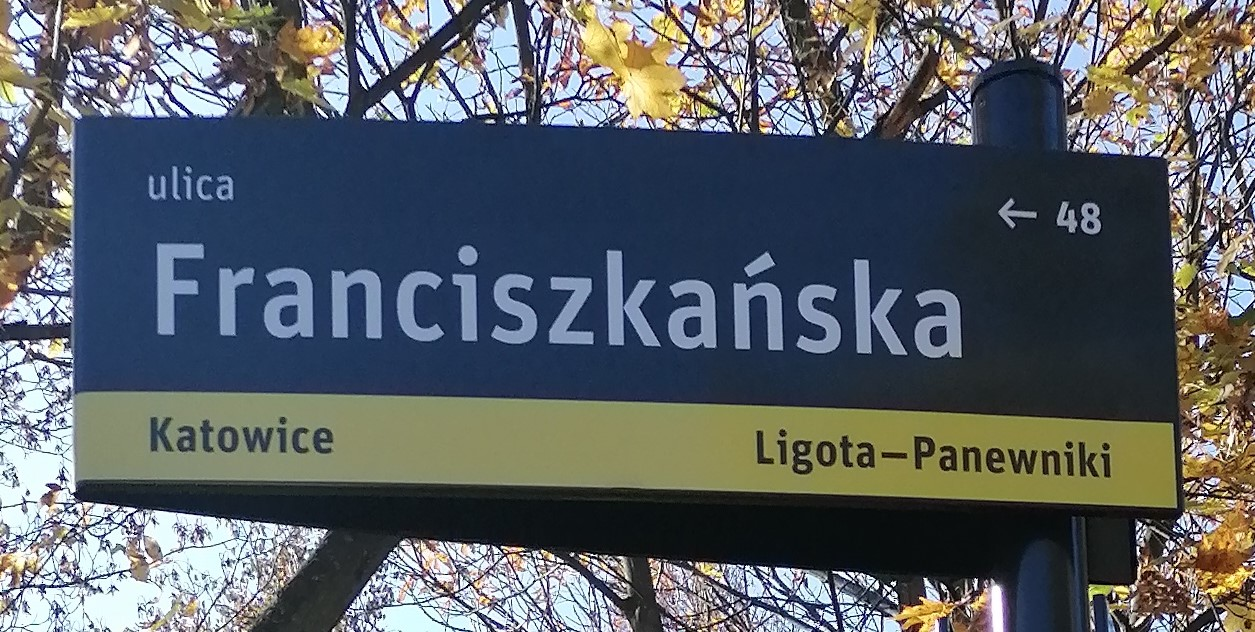
Sign of the Katowice City Information System displaying the street name (Franciszkańska) and the district name (Ligota-Panewniki)

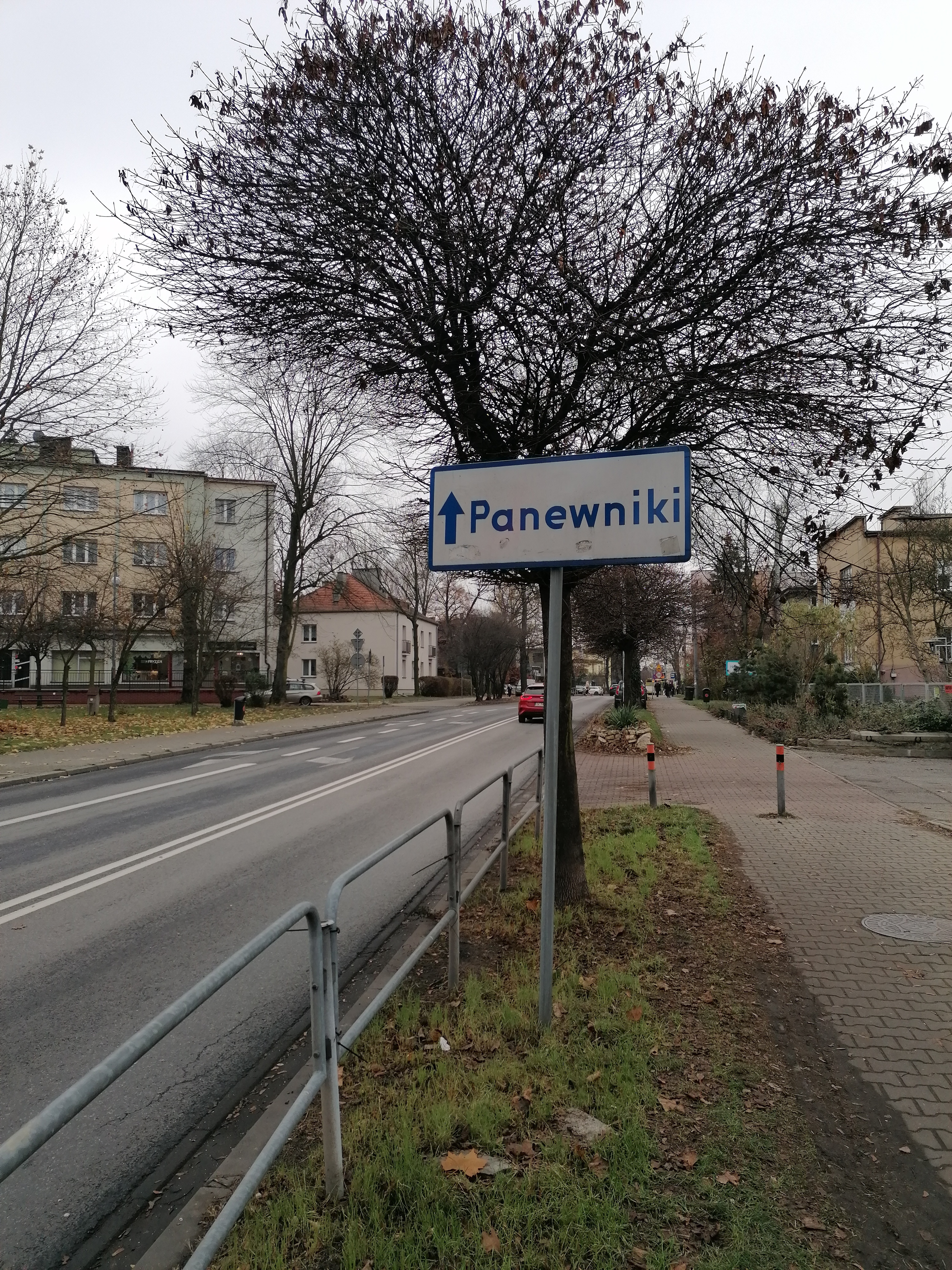
Road sign E-21 indicating the direction towards Panewniki

Ligota-Panewniki is one of the 22 districts of Katowice, numbered 6, and serves as a sub-unit of the gmina. It is the westernmost district of the city, and it forms part of the western district group together with Załęska Hałda-Brynów and Brynów-Osiedle Zgrzebnioka. Its center is located approximately 7 km from the center of Katowice.

The district borders Ruda Śląska and the Załęska Hałda-Brynów district to the north, the Piotrowice-Ochojec district to the east and south, and the towns of Mikołów and Ruda Śląska to the west. Its boundaries are:

- To the north – it runs along the border between Katowice and Ruda Śląska, parallel to the Kłodnica river, from the intersection with the railroad tracks to the watercourse at Zamiejska Street. It then continues along this watercourse to the northeast to the railroad tracks at J. Wybicki Street in Kokociniec, after which the border runs along Katowice Ligota–Gliwice railway to the next intersection with the Kłodnica river. It then continues along the riverbed eastward to the western edge of Tadeusz Kościuszko Street;
- To the east – it runs southwest along the edge of T. Kościuszko Street, then along Kolejowa and Stalowa streets, parallel to the north of Sarmacka Street to the railroad tracks near Zadole Street. The boundary then follows these tracks south toward Ślepotka stream;
- To the south – westward along the Ślepiotka riverbed, and past the Nad Ślepiotką Square, the boundary turns south, encircling Zadole Park from the south, from where it runs toward the industrial areas near A. Asnyk Street, dividing them into two parts. Further on, the boundary follows the Starganiec hiking trail to the city limits of Katowice and Mikołów at the Starganiec pond, then runs northwest along the city boundary to the tripoint of the city limits of Katowice, Mikołów, and Ruda Śląska at the Panewniki Spoil Tip;
- To the west – in a straight line along the border between Katowice and Ruda Śląska, running along the railway.

According to Jerzy Kondracki's physio-geographical regionalization, Ligota-Panewniki is located in the Katowice Upland mesoregion, which forms the southern part of the Silesian Upland macroregion. The Silesian Upland itself is a part of the Silesian-Kraków Upland subprovince.

In terms of historical regions, the district is located in the eastern part of Upper Silesia. Historically, however, Ligota also extends into the areas of the present-day districts of Załęska Hałda-Brynów and Piotrowice-Ochojec. It borders Załęska Hałda and Katowicka Hałda to the north, Brynów and Ochojec to the east, Zadole to the south, and Nowe Panewniki and Kokociniec to the west, while Panewniki borders Ruda Śląska and Załęska Hałda to the north, Mikołów to the west, Ligota to the east, and Zadole and Zarzecze to the south.

The historical boundary of Gmna Ligota runs through the area of present-day Brygadzistów, Ligocka, and Wodospady streets, then along the Kłodnica and east of Rzepakowa Street, and further along Kolejowa Street and along the Ślepiotka. The historical boundaries of Gmina Panewniki in the north and west coincide with the boundaries of the city of Katowice; in the south, they extend to parts of the forests within today's Piotrowice-Ochojec district, while the boundaries between the historical gminas of Ligota and Panewniki run from the north as follows: roughly along J. Wybicki and Kijowska streets to the intersection with the Kokociniec Stream, then along this stream westward to its confluence with the Kłodnica, and then along the river toward the Panewniki basilica, encircling it from the east. Further on, this border runs south to Ślepiotka.

=== Geology ===
Ligota-Panewniki is located in the Upper Silesian Sinkhole in an area with horst structures. At the turn of the Devonian and Carboniferous periods, the Paleozoic bedrock of the Silesian Uplands was disturbed by the formation of a sinkhole, which during the Carboniferous was filled with conglomerates, sandstones, and shales containing bituminous coal deposits. Formations from this period form the bedrock of the district directly beneath Quaternary formations only in the northern part of the Kokociniec housing estate, and the rest of the bedrock formed on Neogene rocks is separated by a fault. These are outcrops of the Orzesze formation (Westphalian B), a massive sequence composed mainly of shales with intercalations of sandstones, siderites, and over 50 seams of coal.

The main features of the Ligota-Panewniki landscape were formed during the Tertiary period. At that time, intense processes of chemical weathering and denudation were taking place. The phase of tectonic movements associated with the Alpine orogeny during the Miocene was of fundamental importance for the development of the landscape. The Silesian-Kraków anticline block fractured at that time, forming, among other features, the Kłodnica graben, which begins west of Ochojec and extends westward through the district. Grabens, depressions, and low-lying horsts were covered by Miocene marine sediments: marly and sandy clays, as well as sands (including pebbles of Carboniferous rocks such as coal). Directly beneath the Quaternary layers, these formations constitute almost the entire surface of Ligota-Panewniki, with the exception of northern Kokociniec, which was built on Carboniferous rocks beneath the Quaternary. On the surface, however, Miocene sediments are absent.

In the Quaternary, the area of the district was likely covered by the Scandinavian ice sheet twice: during the earliest Mindel glaciation and during the Riss glaciation. Sediments from the first glaciation were mostly removed during the interglacial, while the ice sheet of the Riss glaciation, which advanced into the Katowice area from the west along the Kłodnica depression, left behind tills found along the valley depressions. Water from the melting glacier flowed through the valley depressions to the southeast, from the Kłodnica valley to the Mleczna valley and further to the Vistula. During the Last Interglacial, large river deposits were mostly eroded, and their slopes were dissected by numerous side valleys; during the Weichselian glaciation, the area of the district was within the periglacial climate zone. Most of Ligota-Panewniki is composed of Pleistocene fluvioglacial sands and gravels, with a smaller proportion of glacial sands and gravels containing boulders on till (mainly along the line from Wymysłów through Nowe Panewniki and Nowa Ligota to Zadole, as well as in the southern sections near the border with Piotrowice-Ochojec) and tills (the northern sections of the district and in isolated patches in Wymysłów and south of Stare Panewniki).

In the present-day Holocene, Pleistocene sediment layers are being eroded and stripped away. River sediments are found in river valleys, including those of the Kłodnica, Kokociniec Stream, and Ślepotka, while the Ligota-Panewniki area near Wietnamska Street is built on lake sands.

=== Soils ===
In Katowice, including the Ligota-Panewniki area, brown soils predominate, mainly in the leached variety, characteristic of tills or weathered Carboniferous formations. In terms of soil quality, poor and very poor soils (soil quality classes V and VI) prevail in Panewniki.

Soils in the district are subject to intense anthropogenic pressure and, in many cases, have lost their utility value as a result of mechanical alteration. Land leveling processes occur here, particularly in river valleys for future development projects, resulting in the destruction of soil profiles and the soil's humus layer.

=== Terrain ===
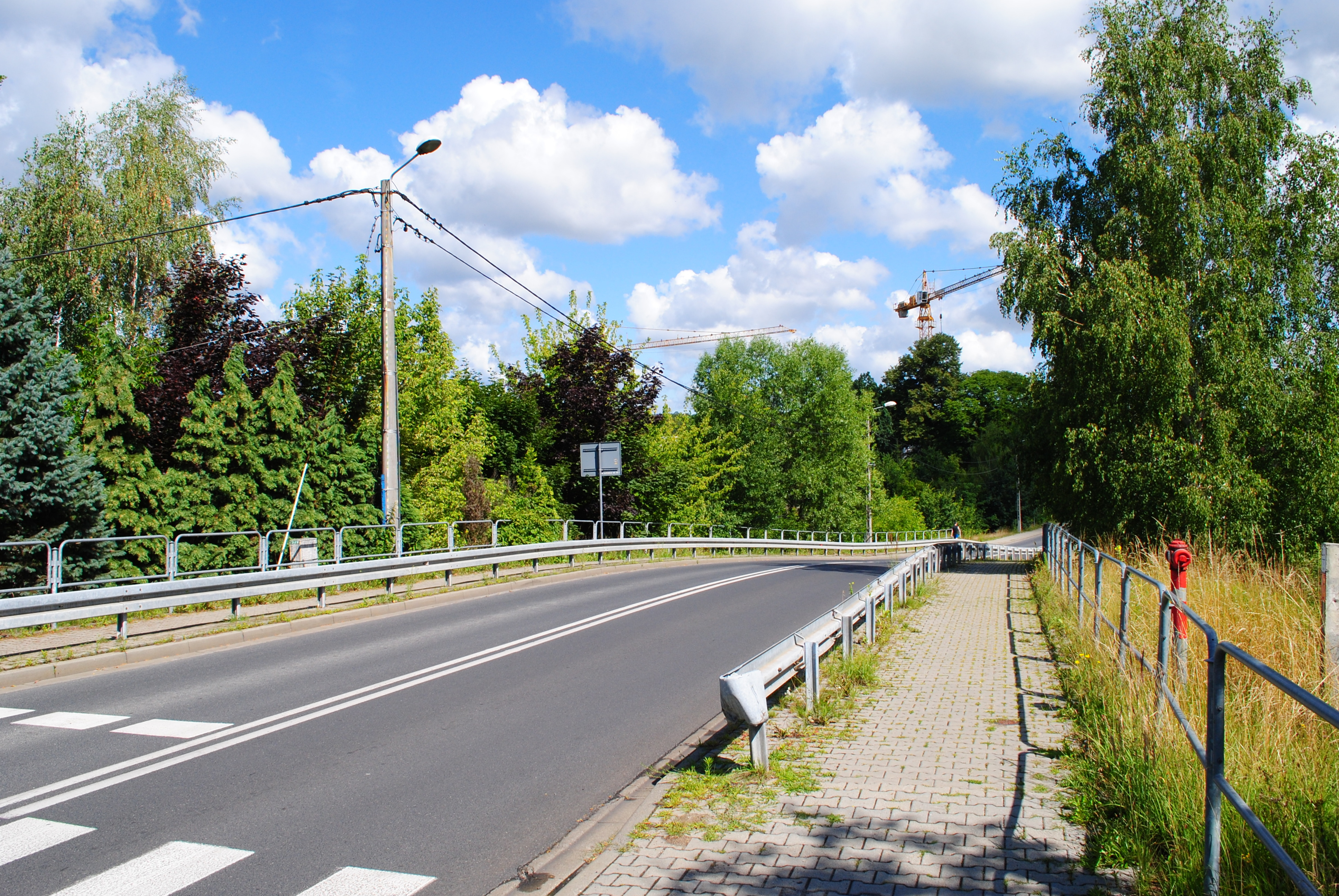
St. Hadyna Street from Piotrowicka Street, partly built on an embankment

Ligota-Panewniki is located in the Silesian Upland, on the Bytom-Katowice Plateau, which is part of the Katowice Upland mesoregion. In terms of morphological units, the district is almost entirely located within the Kłodnica Graben, a tectonic depression drained by the upper section of the Kłodnica river and its tributary, the Ślepotka. The Kłodnica valley has also formed within this graben.

The highest point in the district is located on the border between Ligota-Panewniki and Piotrowice-Ochojec, near the Libero Katowice shopping center (at the intersection of Kolejowa and Tadeusz Kościuszko streets). The elevation there reaches over 285 meters above sea level. The lowest-lying area of the district stretches along the Kłodnica valley on the border between Katowice and Ruda Śląska. It is also one of the two lowest-lying areas in the entire city (the other being the Mleczna valley on the border between Murcki and Tychy), situated below 245 m above sea level.

The topography of Ligota-Panewniki was mainly shaped by the Mindel glaciation and the maximum stage of the Riss glaciation, while in recent times, human activity related to settlement and mining has had a significant impact. This led to the destruction of the natural substrate and the formation of new landforms. The more heavily urbanized eastern part of the district also has an anthropogenic erosion surface. The river valleys have undergone significant transformations – some of them were filled in, including the right tributaries of the Kokociniec Stream in the area of Kijowska and Zielona streets, and the water was diverted into the sewer system. The slopes of the Kłodnica river along Panewnicka Street were reinforced, and the riverbed was concreted. Industrial activity in the 19th century left behind industrial deposits, including glassy slag on the hill separating the Kłodnica river valley and the Kokociniec Stream, as well as embankments along St. Hadyna Street. Land subsidence occurred there as a result of mining activity, especially on the border of Katowice, Ruda Śląska, and Chorzów, as well as in the Kokociniec housing estate between Kijowska and Krucza streets, where the subsidence contributed to the demolition of some apartment buildings.

The Panewniki Spoil Tip is located at the border of the cities of Katowice, Mikołów, and Ruda Śląska, covering an area of 91.8 hectares, of which 0.9 hectares lie within the boundaries of Katowice. It is a spoil tip consisting of mine waste rock created as a result of the operations of the Halemba Coal Mine.

=== Waters ===
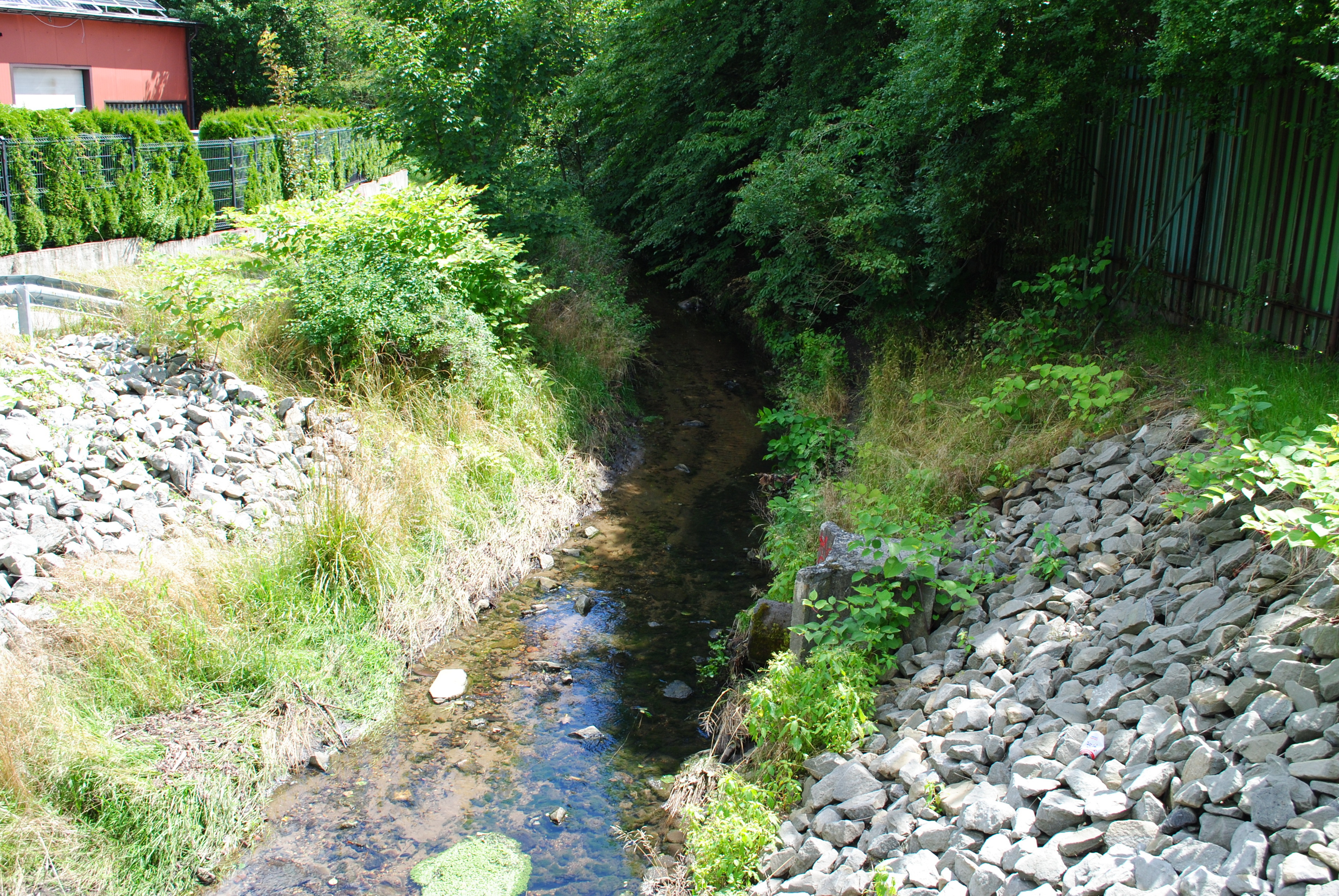
Kłodnica near Kijowska Street in Kokociniec

Ligota-Panewniki is located entirely within the Oder drainage basin, in the basin of the Kłodnica. The Kłodnica is a foothill river characterized by a steep longitudinal gradient and variable flow, passing through the district in a course roughly parallel to the latitude, forming part of the border of Ligota-Panewniki and Załęska Hałda-Brynów, as well as of the cities of Katowice and Ruda Śląska. It flows into Ligota-Panewniki from the east at the intersection with Tadeusz Kościuszko Street. It flows westward, parallel to Kłodnicka Street, crossing the Katowice–Katowice Ligota railway, Piotrowicka Street, Kalwaria Panewnicka, and the Kijowska, Krucza, Gościnna, and Panewnicka streets. Within the district's boundaries, two right-bank tributaries flow into it: the Kokociniec Stream (before it crosses Krucza Street in Kokociniec) and a stream near E. Bojanowski Street. The Kokociniec Stream itself flows from Załęska Hałda in a southwesterly direction, crossing St. Hadyna and Kijowska streets.

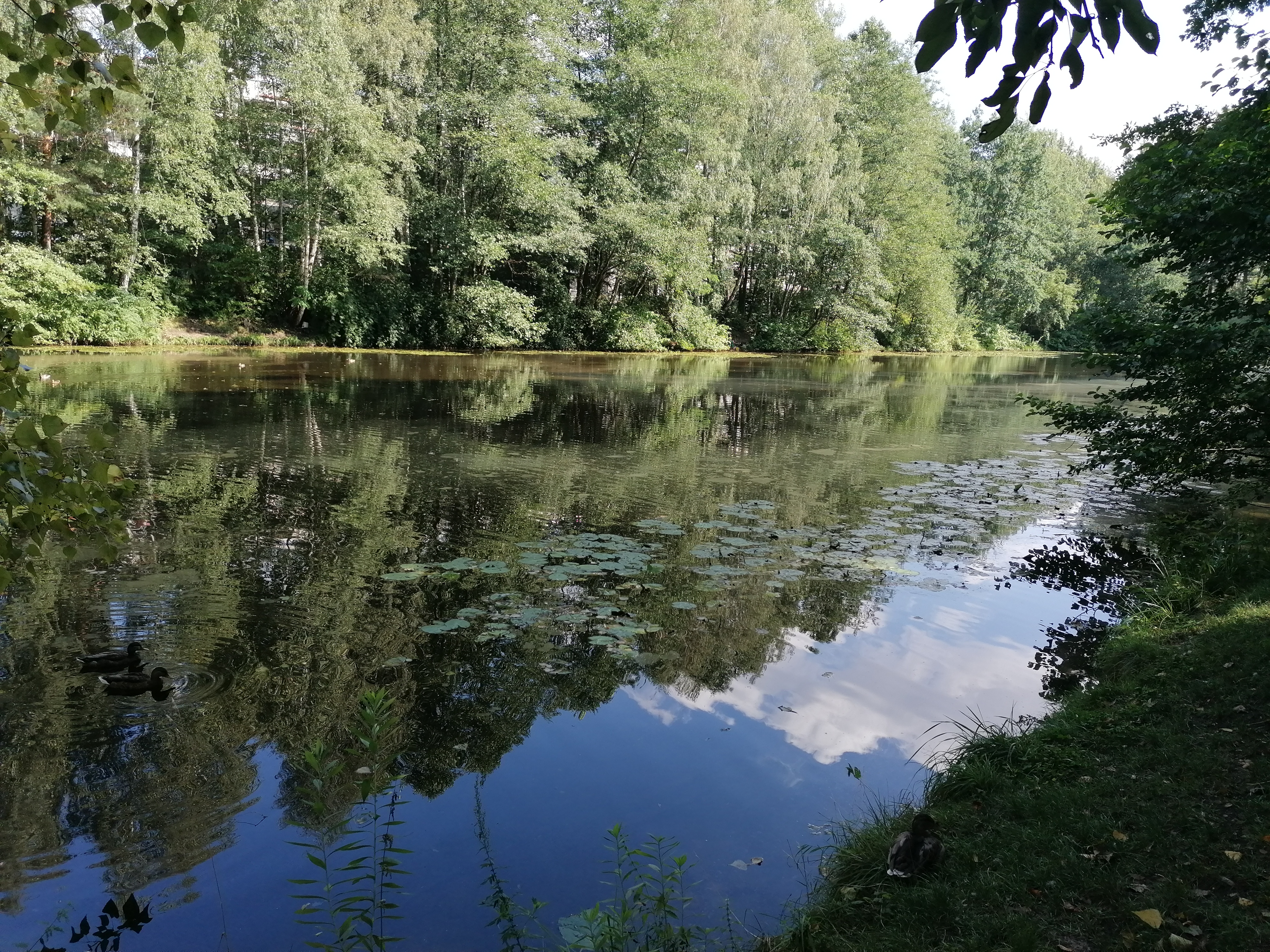
Pond in Zadole Park

On the left bank, the following streams, among others, flow into the Kłodnica river in Ligota-Panewniki: the Ślepotka, the Piotrowice Ditch, and the Panewniki Ditch. The Ślepiotka flows in from the southeast, forming the boundary between Ligota-Panewniki and Piotrowice-Ochojec at Zadole. The river then flows west and northwest, entering the Kłodnica between Owsiana and Gościnna streets. There are two pond complexes in the Ślepiotka river basin in Zadole – one near Piotrowicka Street (within the Nad Ślepiotką Square), and the other near Osiedle Akademickie of the University of Silesia in the vicinity of Śląska Street.

In the past, all the rivers in the district were strongly meandering streams, and the Kłodnica river beyond Stare Panewniki has remained partly in this state. All the rivers, however, have been regulated.

The eastern part of Main Groundwater Reservoir No. 331, "Buried Valley of the Upper Kłodnica River", is located near Panewniki. It is a Quaternary, covered basin whose aquifer thickness varies between 4.8 and 22.0 m, and the average depth of the intakes is approximately 60 m. The aquifers of this reservoir consist of glacial sands and gravels.

=== Climate ===
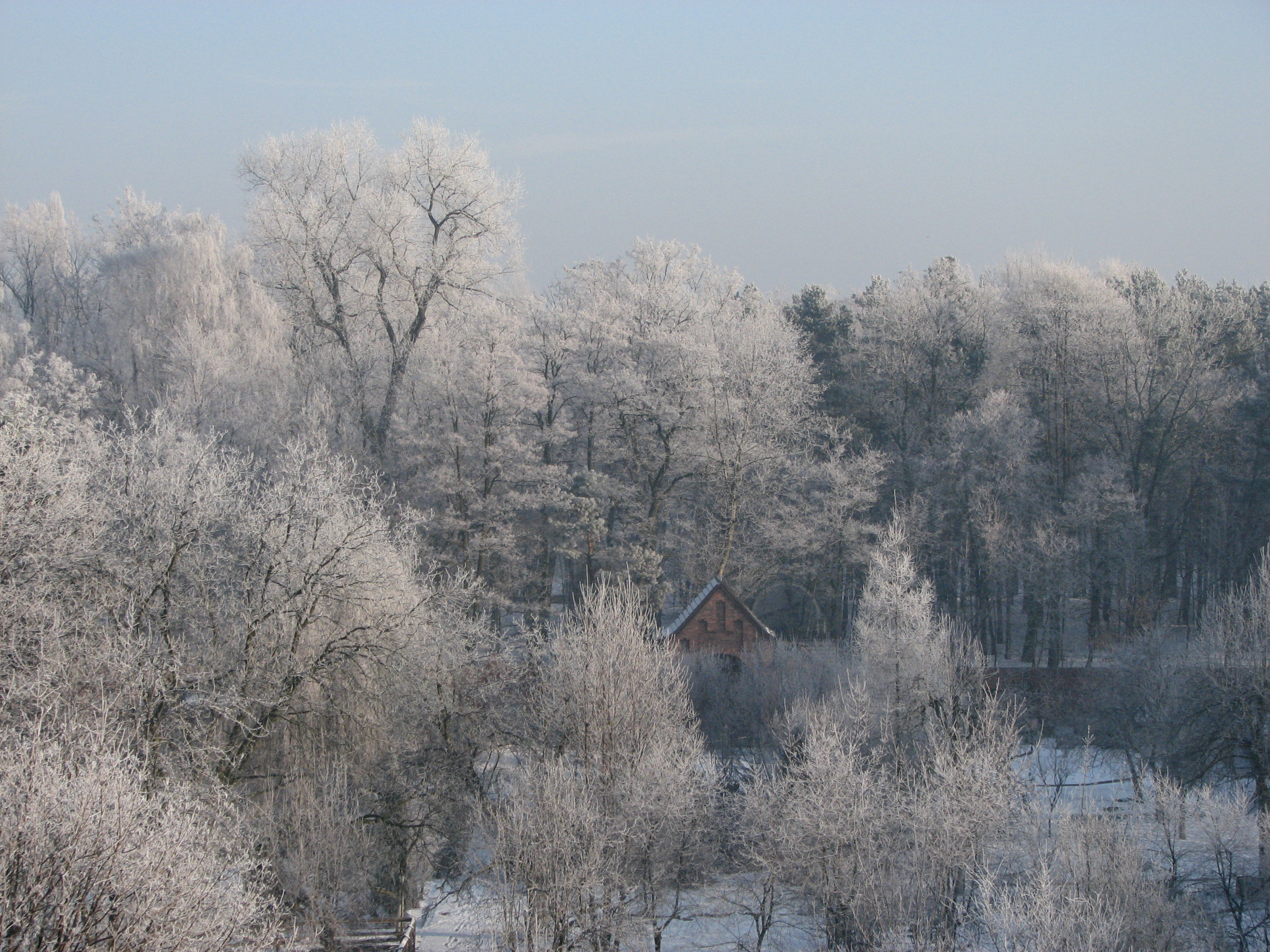
Garden of the Franciscan monastery in winter 2011

The climatic conditions in Ligota-Panewniki are similar to those of Katowice as a whole. They are influenced by both climatic and local factors. Oceanic influences have a greater impact on the district's climate than continental ones, while the climate is occasionally modified by tropical air masses reaching the area from the southwest through the Moravian Gate.

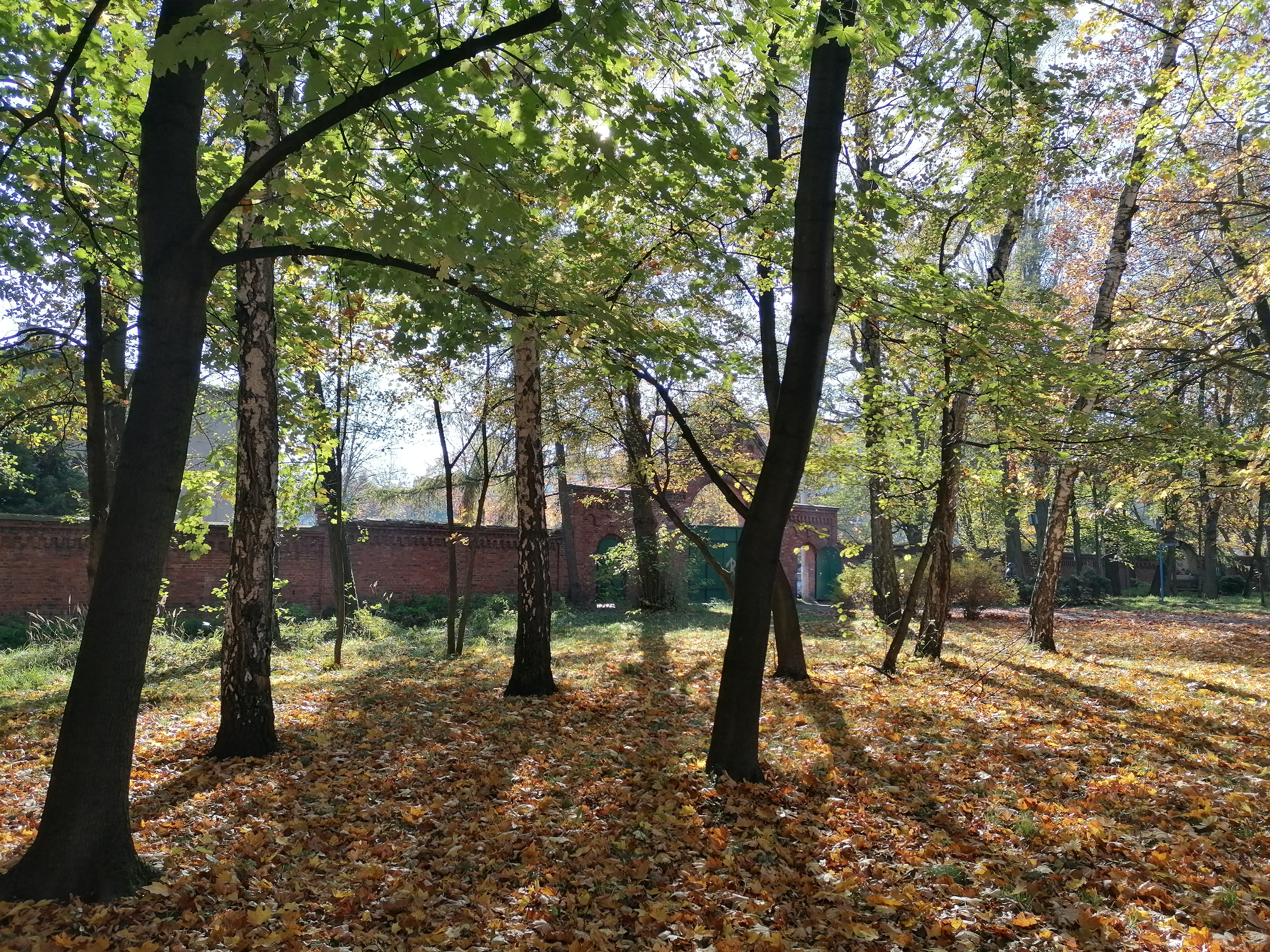
Part of Kalwaria Panewnicka in autumn 2022

The average annual temperature for the 1961–2005 period at the nearby station in Muchowiec was 8.1°C. The warmest month during the study period was July (17.8°C), and the coldest was January (–2.2°C). The average annual sunshine duration from 1966 to 2005 was 1,474 hours, while the average cloud cover was 5.3. The average annual precipitation between 1951 and 2005 was 713.8 mm. The average duration of snow cover is 60–70 days, and the growing season lasts an average of 200–220 days. Throughout the year, westerly and southwesterly winds predominate (20.7% and 20.4% of all winds, respectively), while winds from the north are the least frequent (5.7%). The average wind speed was 2.4 m/s.

The climate of Ligota-Panewniki is influenced by local factors (microclimate), which depend on land cover as well as on the area's location relative to river valleys. In the valley bottoms of the Kłodnica, Ślepiotka, Kokocińca, and other streams, there is an unfavorable microclimate typical of built-up valley bottoms. On clear nights, pockets of cold air form, and local radiation-advection frosts are possible. In the higher-elevation areas of the district, conditions are moderately favorable. In areas of dense development, the local climate is influenced by the heating of the atmosphere due to human activity. Dense surfaces of buildings, roads, and squares cause an increase in air temperature in the lower atmospheric layer. These areas also lose heat more quickly due to radiation at night, and the lack of moisture in the air does not favor prolonged heat retention. Forests, on the other hand, are characterized by significantly smaller nighttime temperature drops than in neighboring areas.

=== Nature and environmental protection ===
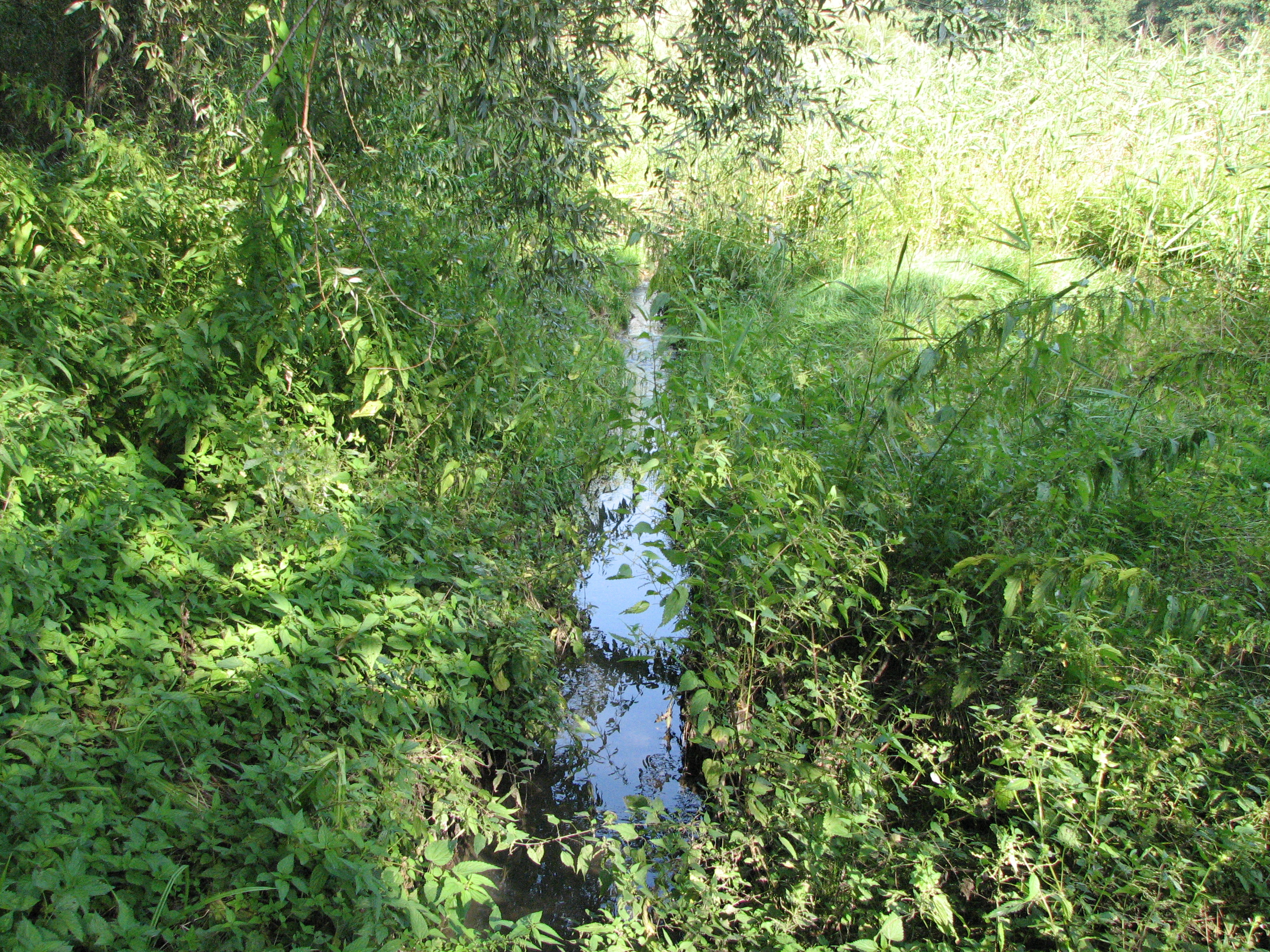
Part of Kokociniec Stream, within which fragments of riparian habitat with patches of alder-willow woodland and scrub have been preserved

The natural vegetation in Ligota-Panewniki has been developing since the last glaciation, which occurred 12,000–16,000 years ago, and over the past 200 years it has been subjected to significant anthropogenic pressure. Originally, the northern and eastern parts of the district were covered by hornbeam-oak forests, the western part by coniferous forest, and the river valleys by riparian forests and alder carrs. These original forests were part of the historic Silesian Forest. The vegetation of Katowice, like other elements of the natural environment, has been significantly transformed as a result of urbanization and industrial activity. Despite the ongoing impoverishment of the city's flora, the diversity of existing plant communities there remains high. The southwestern part of the city, including parts of Ligota-Panewniki, still has an open character. Urban-industrial areas are located there within an agricultural-forest landscape, and over time, there has been increasing pressure to develop vacant land. In urbanized habitats, ruderal communities have developed, mainly in anthropogenic built-up areas and on urban wastelands within the district.

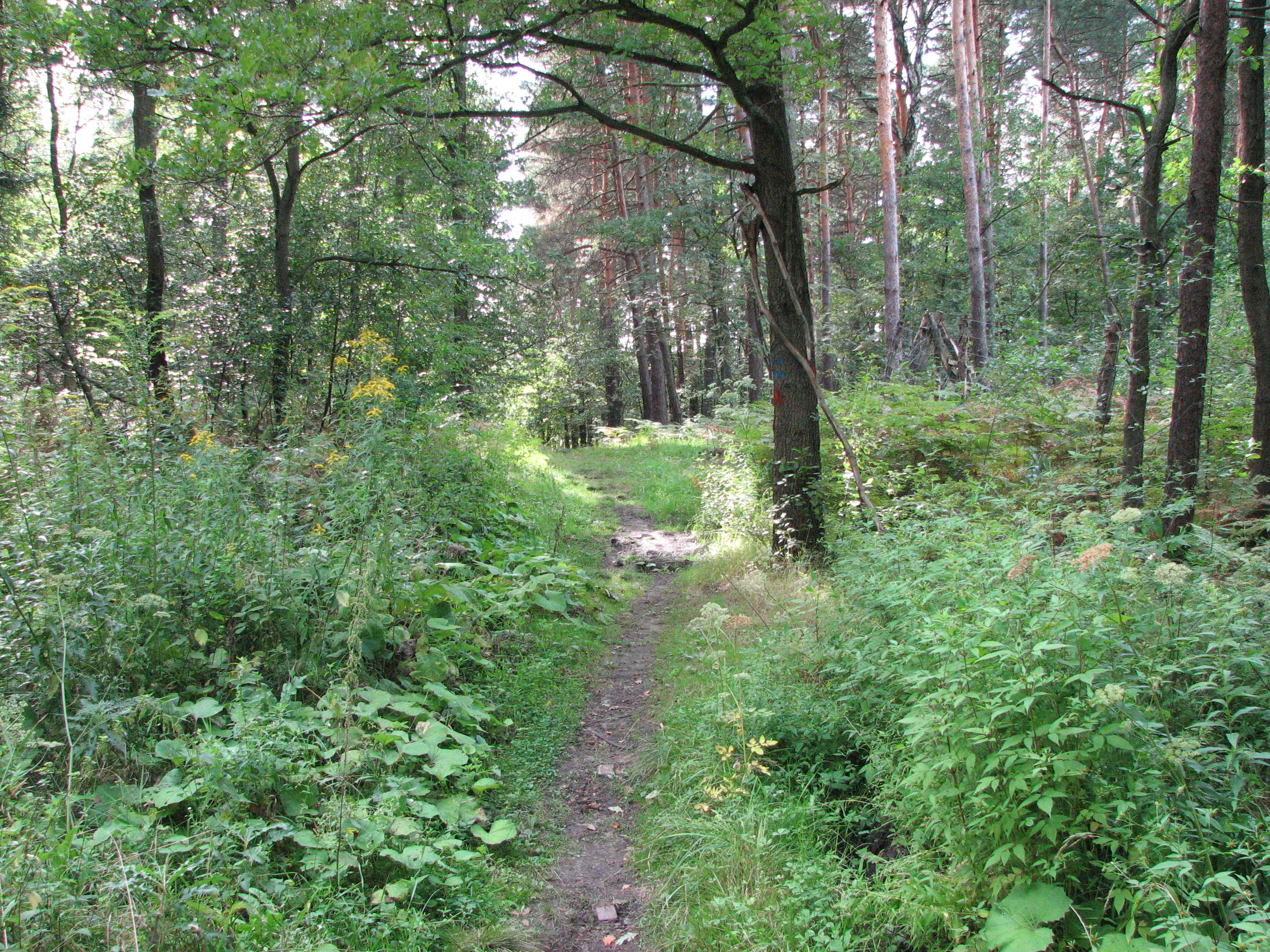
Part of Panewniki Forests

Some areas of Katowice, including Ligota-Panewniki, have retained natural and semi-natural landscapes. The Panewniki Forests complex, in particular, is characterized by high natural and landscape values. These forests are one of the most important elements of the region's ecological structure. In terms of habitats, pine and mixed forests predominate there, while the forests between Kokociniec and Załęże (Załęże Forest) are deciduous. In the Panewniki Forest District, which is part of the Katowice Forest District, the following rare and protected plants were inventoried according to 2012 data: marsh Labrador tea, lesser periwinkle, ivy, bog bilberry, Veratrum lobelianum, herb Paris, Solomon's seal, lily of the valley, Siberian iris, sweet woodruff, ostrich fern, great horsetail, various Orchis species, common twayblade, mezereon, northern firmoss, and small cranberry.

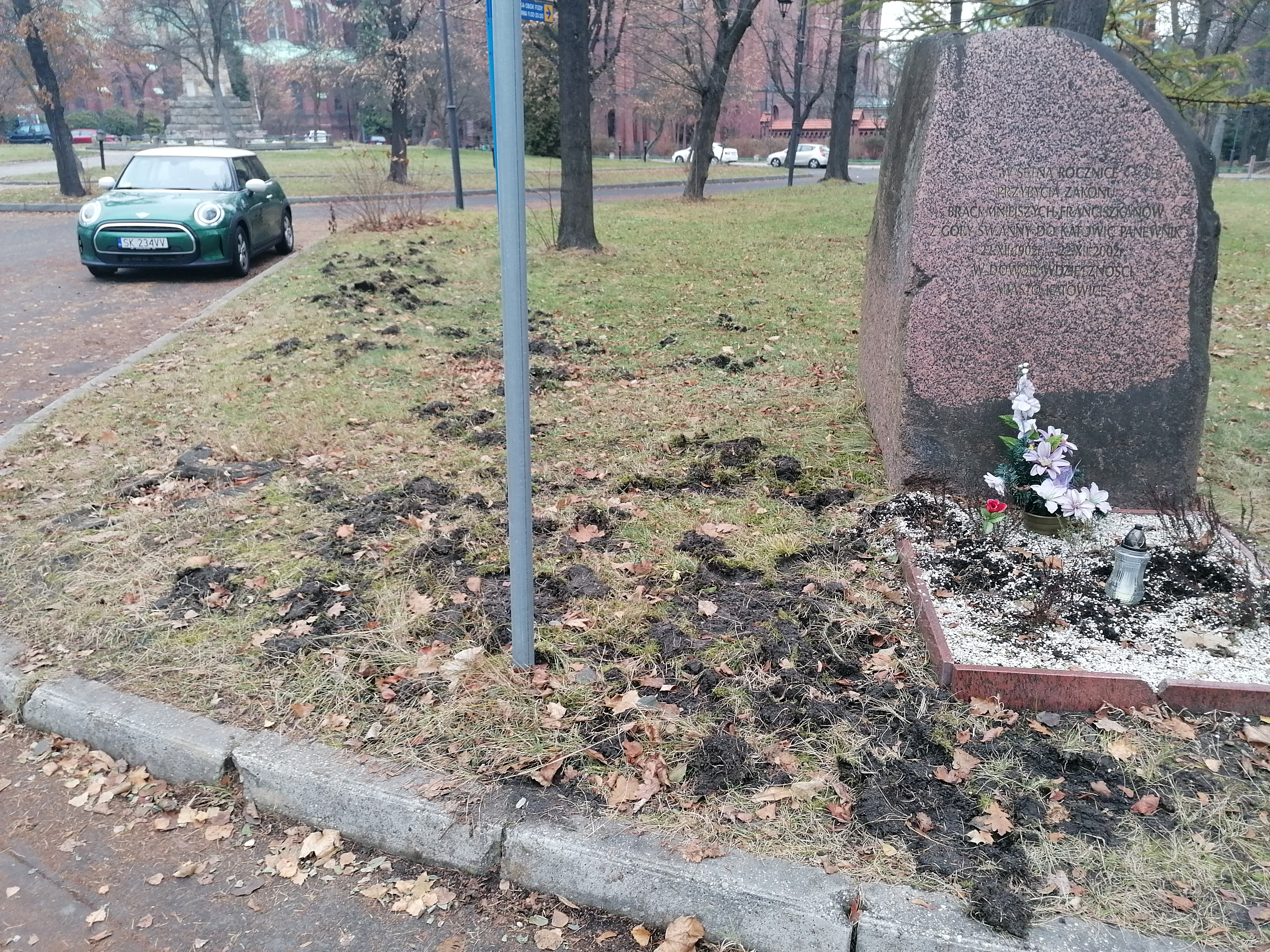
Evidence of the presence of wild boar near Klasztorny Square in Panewniki

Areas within Ligota-Panewniki that possess exceptional natural and landscape values, are significant for the conservation of valuable plant and animal species, biodiversity, ensuring ecological connectivity, and landscape protection include:

- Kokociniec Stream – the lower, undeveloped part of the valley covering an area of 12.8 ha, connecting to the wildlife corridor of the Kłodnica. Fragments of riparian habitats with patches of alder-willow forest and thickets have been preserved here;
- Kłodnica river valley – open areas covering 54.5 ha, constituting the main part of a degraded wildlife corridor in need of regeneration. The western part of the valley has high landscape value and great floristic diversity;
- Stare Panewniki – a forest-meadow area covering 12.6 ha, wet in places, in the Panewniki Ditch valley and partly in the Kłodnica valley. Fragments of peatland and forest communities (coniferous swamp) have been preserved there, and the presence of four protected plant species and several protected species of amphibians and birds has been confirmed.

As the process of clearing forests for farmland began, large game began to leave the Panewniki Forests. Today, these forests are home to roe deer, hares, weasels, foxes, pine martens, squirrels, and small rodents. Wild boars living in the area are also found in the urbanized parts of Ligota-Panewniki. A species exchange is taking place – among the introduced species, fallow deer and pheasants have appeared, as well as raccoons and raccoon dogs.

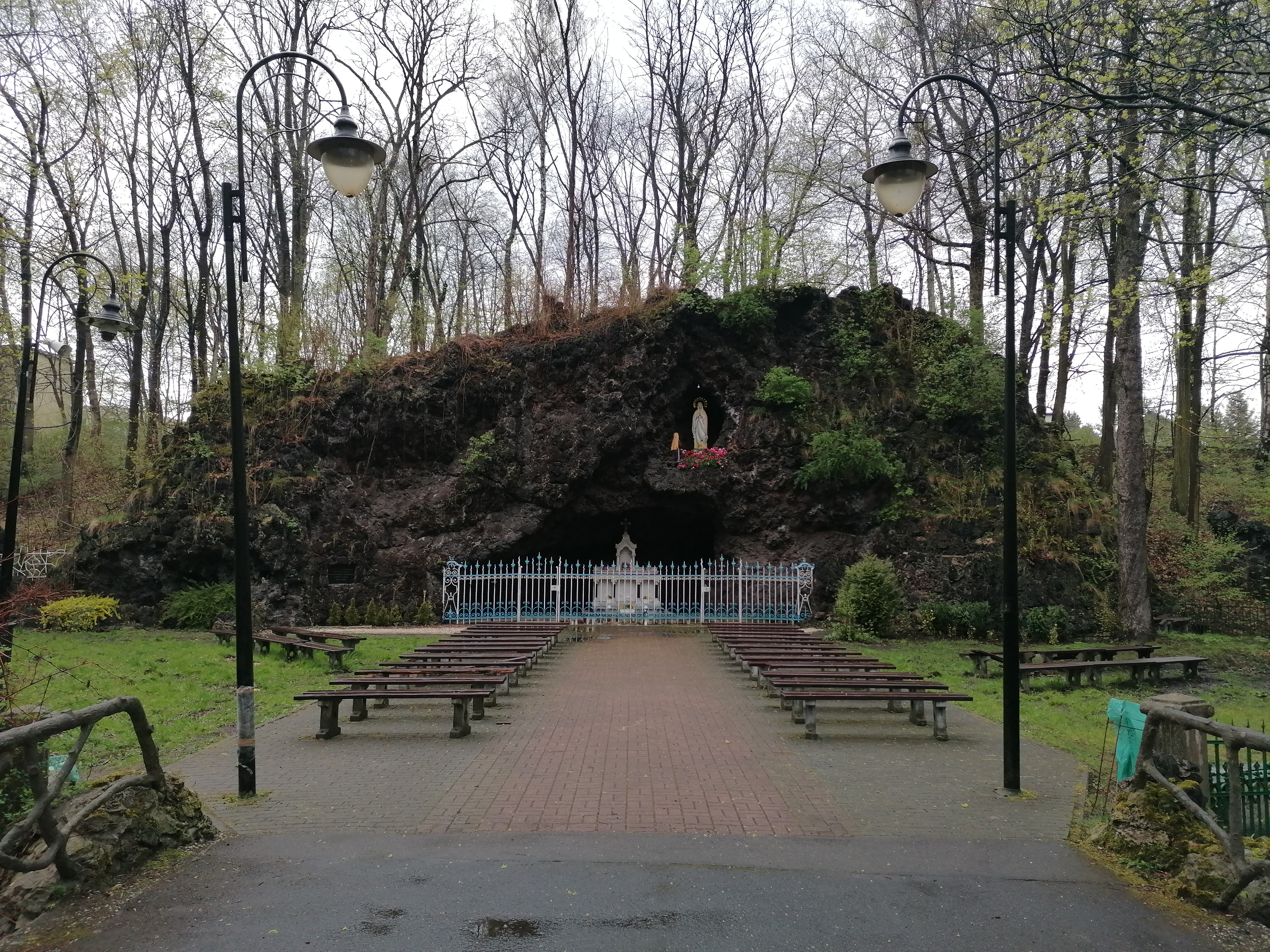
Replica of the Lourdes grotto from 1905 at Kalwaria Panewnicka

As of 2023, there are no designated nature conservation areas within the district. The only natural monument is a pedunculate oak (Quercus robur) with a height of 22 m and a diameter at breast height of 349 cm, located on the grounds of the Franciscan monastery in Panewniki. It was designated a natural monument on 12 December 1953.

Zadole Park and Kalwaria Panewnicka are among the most important landscaped green areas in Katowice, while Sister Cities Square is one of the green areas serving an integrating function within one of the urban planning schemes. Zadole Park, covering an area of 7.76 ha, is a forest park with a forest stand of average compositional and natural value. The park serves as a venue for neighborhood mass events. It was established in the 1960s within a recreational area. The publicly accessible Kalwaria Panewnicka, covering an area of 10.55 ha, is a green space of natural and cultural value that meets the recreational needs of the district's residents. Due to its sacred character, no sports or recreational facilities are located within its boundaries.

A nature trail with a forest silvarium has been established in the vicinity of the Katowice Forest District headquarters at 37b Kijowska Street, and the administration building itself houses a Forest Education Room.

There are three complexes of Family Allotment Gardens in Ligota-Panewniki (2007):

- Bronisławy (Warmińska Street) – 1.22 ha; 30 plots;
- Olszynka (Piotrowicka Street) – 4.04 ha; 110 plots;
- Pod Lasem (Bałtycka Street) – 5.19 ha; 110 plots.

== Name ==
The name Ligota-Panewniki is a compound name consisting of the names of the two main parts of Katowice that comprise it: Ligota and Panewniki. The name Ligota, which historically was also known as Ligota Pszczyńska, means wola.

One of the German names for Ligota is Ellgoth. The other – Idaweiche, derived from the name of a railway junction leading to the Ida Iron Works – was introduced by the German occupiers during World War II to replace the earlier Ellgoth.

The name Panewniki referred to a settlement inhabited by people who made pans. Its origin is also attributed to a person nicknamed Panewnik. Originally, however, Panewniki was referred to in the singular form, Panewnik. The plural form of the name appeared when Panewniki was incorporated into Katowice in 1951.

== History ==
=== To the 19th century ===
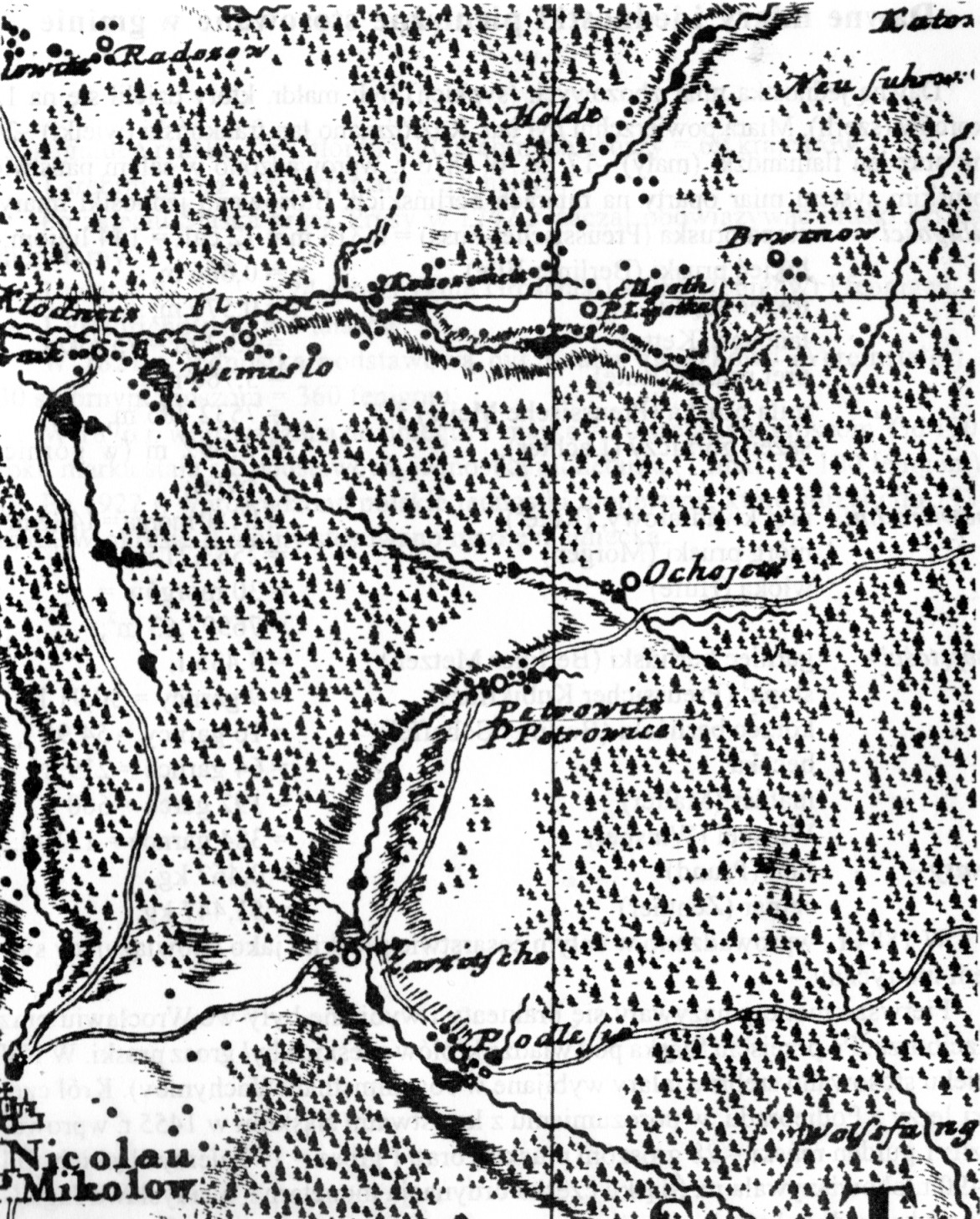
Detail from the 1752 map Atlas Silesiae... by Johann Wolfgang Wieland and Matthaeus von Schubarth, depicting part of the present-day Ligota-Panewniki, including Ligota, Kokociniec, and Wymysłów, as well as the Kłodnica and Ślepiotka rivers flowing through the region

The first mentions of Ligota-Panewniki date back to the 14th century. A document from 1360 issued by the then-owner of these lands – Duke Nicholas II – to Otton of Pilica mentions, among other things, Ligota as a village in the Pszczyna land. This document mainly attests to the progress of colonization and the degree of land development. It also indicates the existence of villages organized there under German law (Ligota was presumably founded under these same laws). This is also the first mention of Ligota. The settlement was located in the area of present-day Stara Ligota in the district of Załęska Hałda-Brynów (the area of the today's Ligocka, Załęska, Hetmańska, and Rolna streets).

At one point in its history, Ligota was an abandoned village. This may have occurred between the 1420s and 1430s, when military operations related to the Hussite Wars swept through Upper Silesia. Chronicles record Ligota as an abandoned settlement in the 16th century and in the first half of the 17th century. The then-deserted village of Ligota is mentioned in a 1517 document regarding the sale of land in Pszczyna to the Thurzós by Duke Casimir II. By the end of the 16th century, the settlement remained uninhabited, as indicated by a document granting a forest in Ligota to the sołtys of Piotrowice in 1588. The village did not disappear, and the surrounding farmland continued to be used by residents of nearby settlements. It was likely deserted due to a spreading epidemic or the destruction caused by military operations during the period of conflict between the Silesian dukes. Ligota was resettled only at the end of the 17th century, but was still referred to as Ligotka in the 18th century.

Earlier, in the 16th century, the entailed Mysłowice estate was separated from the Pszczyna estate, and the remaining part gave rise to a settlement serving the Pszczyna Hammer Mill (now Stara Kuźnia in the southern part of Ruda Śląska), currently known as Panewniki. It was founded around 1580 by the Kłodnica river at the mouth of the Ślepotka – later known as Stare Panewniki (according to Marta Chmielewska, the village likely already existed in the 14th century), and its establishment was favorable due to the long period of peace prevailing at the time, during which the then rulers of Pszczyna initiated settlement campaigns. Panewniki first appeared in written sources in 1586. It is likely that Panewniki was initially one of the service settlements in which pans were produced for the Pszczyna Hammer Mill. In the 17th century, the village already had a municipal administration headed by a wójt, and at that time, there was likely also an inn on the site of the current property at 463 Panewnicka Street.

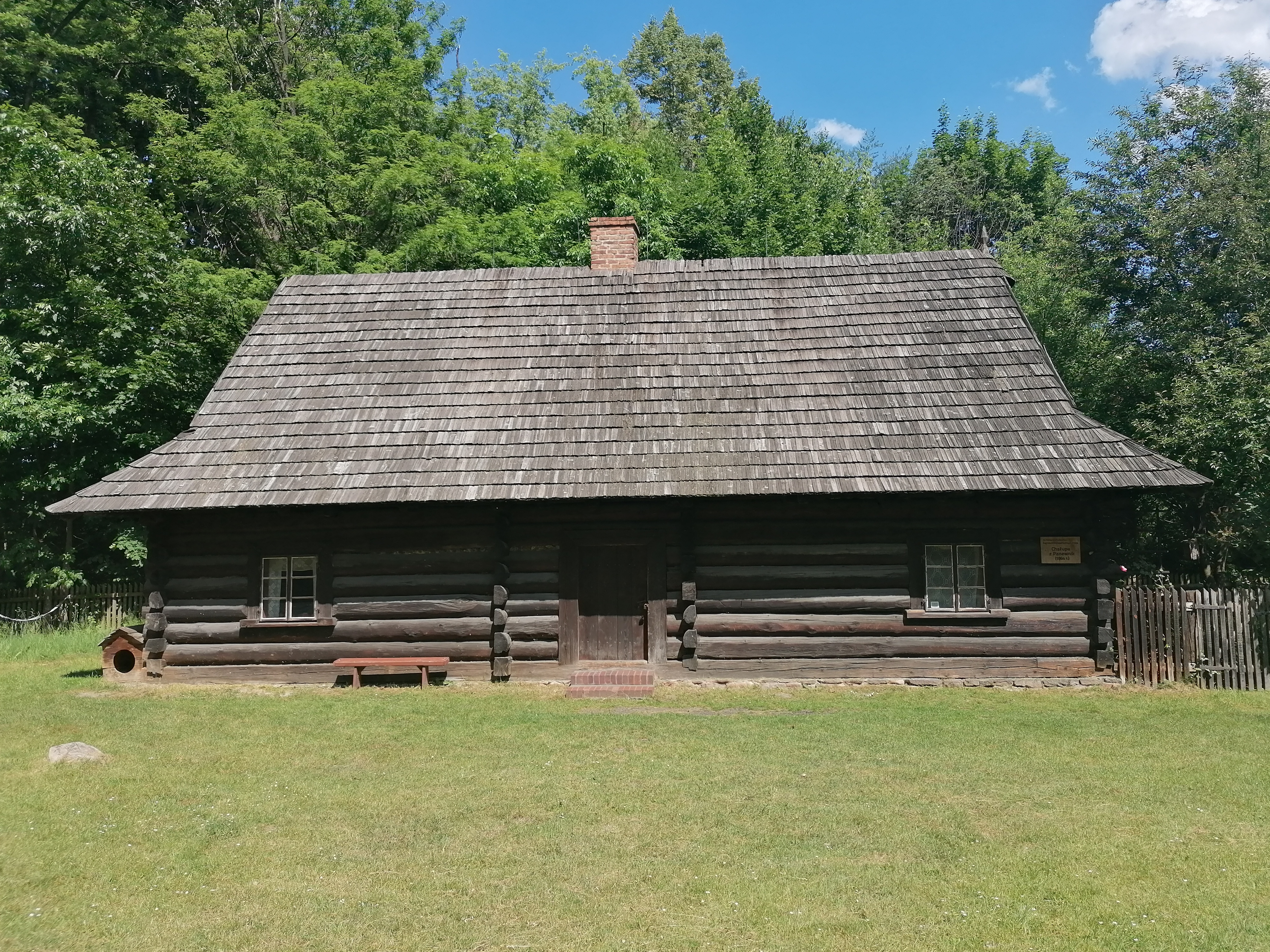
Cottage from Panewniki dating from 1864 (Upper Silesian Ethnographic Park)

In the 17th century, two hamlets were established in Panewniki: Kokociniec and Wymysłów. At that time, a hammer mill was built in Kokociniec, around which a settlement also developed. It was founded by the landowners and operated as part of the manor's overall economy. The hammer mill ceased operations in the mid-18th century with the emergence of competition in the form of finery forges. With the closure of the facility, however, the number of peasant farms increased. The first mention of Wymysłów – a small hamlet between Panewniki and Kokociniec – dates back to 1681 (according to Lech Szaraniec, Wymysłów was founded as early as the 14th century), and its establishment is likely linked to the development of the hammer mill that existed at that time in Kokociniec.

The Thirty Years' War, which lasted throughout the 17th century, especially between 1621 and 1646, was a time of crisis for the Pszczyna lands. These areas suffered losses due to looting, plundering, and forced contributions, as well as a decline in population. A map of the Pszczyna land (Ichnoorthographia Plesniaca) by Andreas Hindenberg, published in 1636, indicates the existence of both Ligota (as the Ligota Forest – German: Ellgott Walde) and Panewniki, and at the mouth of the Ślepotka, the hamlet of Wymysłów is also marked. It is likely that even then there was a path running along the Kłodnica, whose waters were dammed for the needs of a watermill first mentioned in 1620 (it operated until the mid-19th century, and was owned by the administration of the estates of the Duchy of Pless).

In the second half of the 17th century, Ligota was repopulated. Settlement activity in the village likely began after 1680 – documents from 1701 already mention the existence of the village of Ligota (de villa Ligotha). The village took on a character more akin to a cotter settlement than a farmstead one. In 1718, 12 cotters lived in Ligota, and by 1740, there were 23. Ligota gained the status of an independent gmina in the early 18th century, with a sołtys appointed by the administration of the Duchy of Pless. From the mid-18th century until the 1920s, a watermill operated on the Ślepiotka, which for many years was owned by the Materla family, while the mill in Ligota was still in operation at the beginning of the 19th century, after which it was converted into a sawmill. It was located on Piotrowicka Street near the bridge over the Kłodnica.

=== 19th century and early 20th century ===
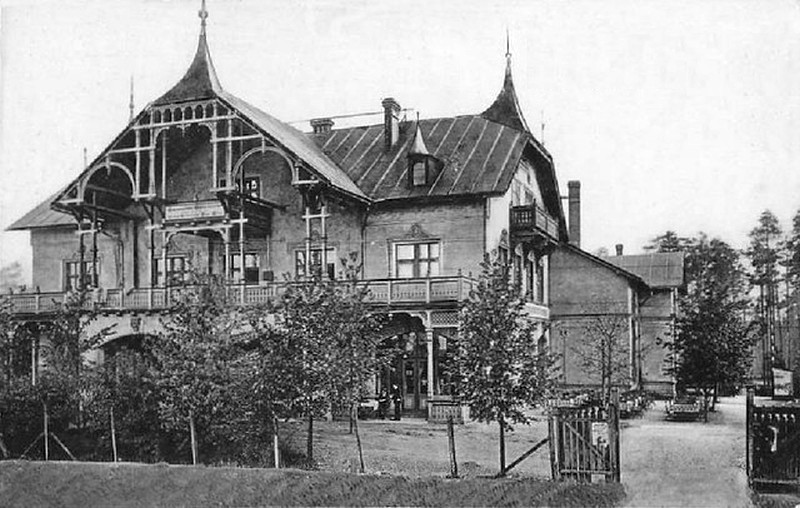
Former Zum Fürstenhofe restaurant at the present-day 2–2b Franciszkańska Street in Ligota, built at the turn of the 19th and 20th centuries

Until the end of the 18th century, the area of present-day Katowice relied mainly on agriculture and forestry, with soils of low fertility. Real industrial development began in the 1830s with the emancipation of the peasants, who from that moment on were able to travel freely, joining the ranks of industrial workers. Ligota's population grew rapidly in the first half of the 19th century. From the 19th century, the settlement began to develop as a summer resort for the residents of Katowice, which intensified after the construction of the railway connecting Katowice with Murcki via Ligota, put into service on 1 December 1852. At the turn of the 19th and 20th centuries, many industrial plants were established in Ligota, such as a paint factory, an oil refinery, and a brickworks; as industry developed, the population grew, and service and educational activities expanded.

For a long time, Panewniki developed as an agricultural village and became a resort town, mainly thanks to the inn located in Stare Panewniki. In the mid-19th century, on the initiative of the Pszczyna estate, another inn was established – later known as the Maria house (374b Panewnicka Street) – which subsequently served as a nursing home. The Ida Iron Works was built between 1846 and 1847 on the site of the former Kokociniec iron works. It consisted of two blast furnaces fueled by coke and charcoal and one smaller one, and was owned by the Pszczyna dukes. In the mid-19th century, in addition to the Ida Iron Works and the Szadok Coal Mine, two craft workshops were in operation in Gmina Panewniki.

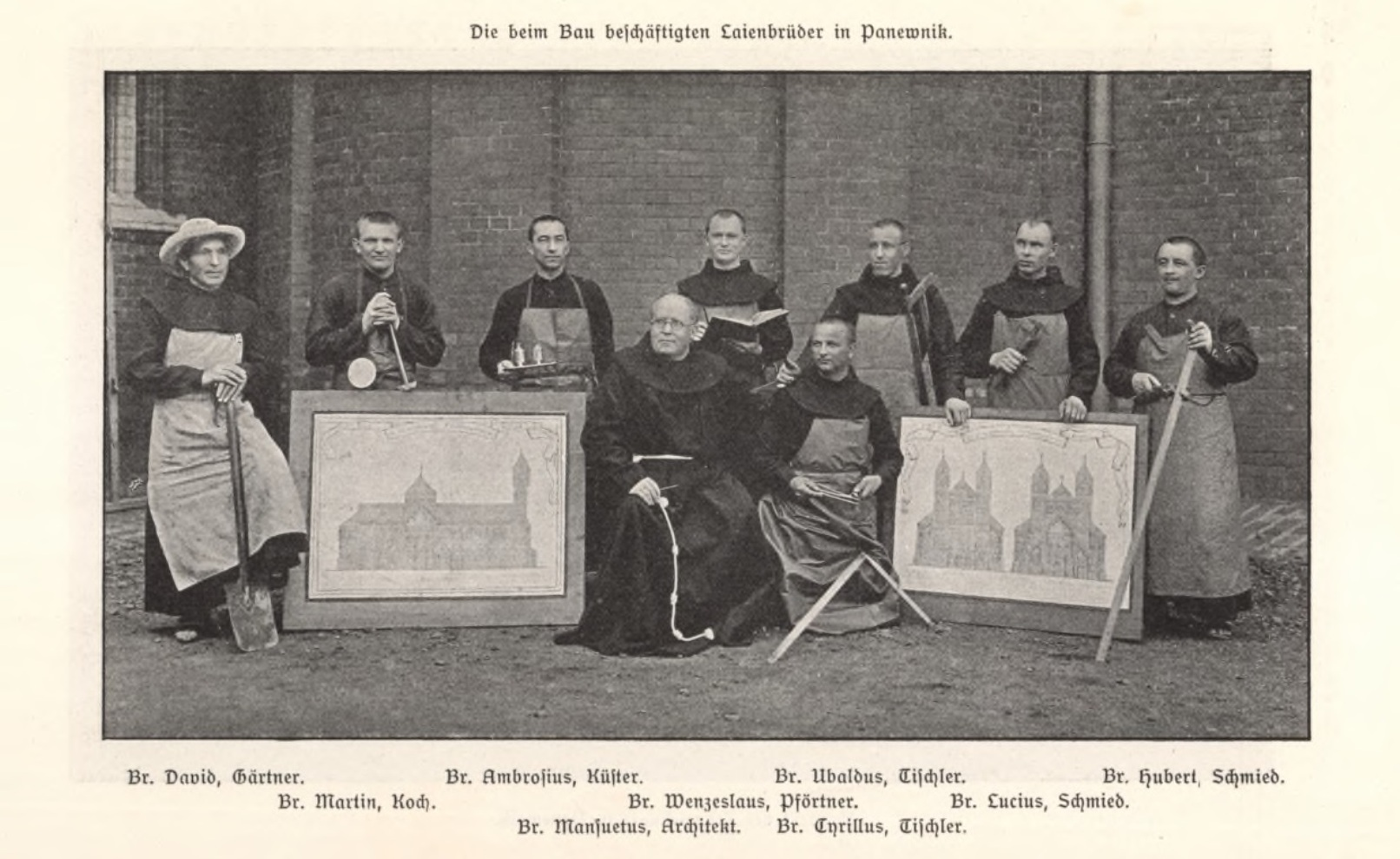
Photograph from 1908 showing Franciscan friars involved in the construction of the church in Panewniki; some of them are holding a board displaying the plans for the church under construction

In the 19th century, Zadole was founded as a hamlet of Piotrowice by the Ślepiotka. The settlement grew gradually alongside the industrial development of present-day Katowice, especially from the second half of the 19th century, following the construction of the Katowice–Rybnik railway. In 1828 (or 1825), the first school was established in Panewniki, housed in the room of one of the smallholders, Wawrzyniec Matura. Between 1879 and 1880, a school for children from Ligota was built in Stara Ligota (Hetmańska Street).

In the early 20th century, construction began on a Franciscan monastery complex in Panewniki. The monks had been brought from Góra Świętej Anny in 1902 on the initiative of Father Ludwik Skowronek. The first monks were Fathers Kamil Bolczyk and Wilhelm Rogosz. The Renaissance Revival monastery complex was built between 1905 and 1908. The Franciscans of Panewniki established, among other things, the tradition of setting up one of the region's most famous nativity scenes inside the church. In 1909, the first sisters from the Congregation of the Servants of the Immaculate Conception arrived in Panewniki from Poręba near Góra Świętej Anny and took up residence in the building that would later become the Panewniki kindergarten, located at the corner of present-day Panewnicka and Medyków streets.

=== Interwar period and World War II ===
At the start of the First Silesian Uprising on 17 August 1919, the insurgents captured the Katowice Ligota railway station for a few hours, cutting off the connection between Katowice and Żory. They also attacked a Grenzschutz outpost, seizing weapons in the process, but the Germans quickly sent reinforcements, and the insurgents were forced to retreat toward the forest in Szadok. After the uprising ended on 26 August 1919, some of the insurgents fled to the Dąbrowa Basin, with the possibility of returning without facing consequences for their participation in the uprising only after 1 October, under an agreement between the Polish and German governments.

No specific information has survived regarding the participation of the residents of Ligota and Panewniki during the Second Silesian Uprising.

During the 1921 Upper Silesia plebiscite, 71% of voters from Gmina Ligota and 82% from Gmina Panewniki voted in favor of Upper Silesia joining Poland.

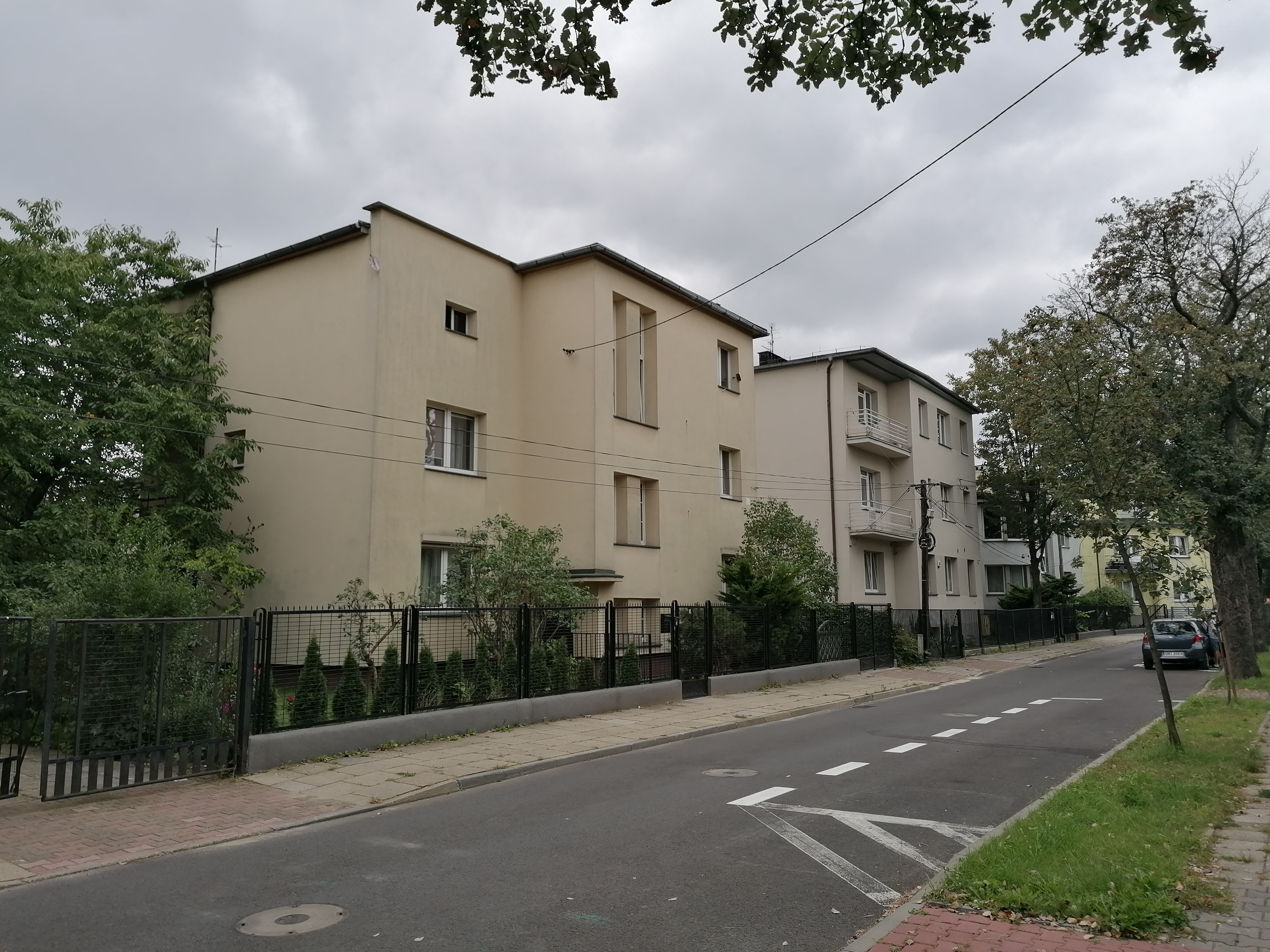
Part of the voivodeship civil servants' colony built in the 1930s in Ligota (Kaszubska Street)

The Third Silesian Uprising broke out on the night of 2–3 May 1921. In the early hours, the insurgents seized the railway station in Ligota, the gmina's office building, the post office, and local industrial facilities. During this uprising, Ligota served as one of the staging grounds for insurgent forces prior to the attack on Katowice, and trains departed from the Ligota railway station to join the fighting along the Oder river and near Góra Świętej Anny. Among those originating from Ligota were battalion commanders Alojzy Kurtok and Leopold Kocima, a recipient of the Virtuti Militari. These battalions belonged to the 1st Pszczyna Regiment fighting along the Oder line (Obrowiec – Strzebniów – Stare Koźle). Insurgents from Panewniki also fought in the same regiment. During this time, over a dozen residents of Ligota were killed in the insurgent fighting. After the Silesian Uprisings, Upper Silesia, including the Ligota-Panewniki district, was incorporated into Poland in 1921. A Polish administration was established there, including in Ligota and Panewniki.

On 15 October 1924, Ligota was incorporated into the city of Katowice. Immediately after its annexation to the city, a decision was made to build residential houses for employees of the Silesian Voivodeship Office. This "Civil Servants' Colony" was established between the Ślepiotka river and Piotrowicka and Panewnicka streets, while the center of Ligota shifted to the area of Franciszkańska and Smolna streets. Shortly before the outbreak of World War II, a modern school was constructed in Ligota, currently the seat of Scout Defenders of Katowice High School.

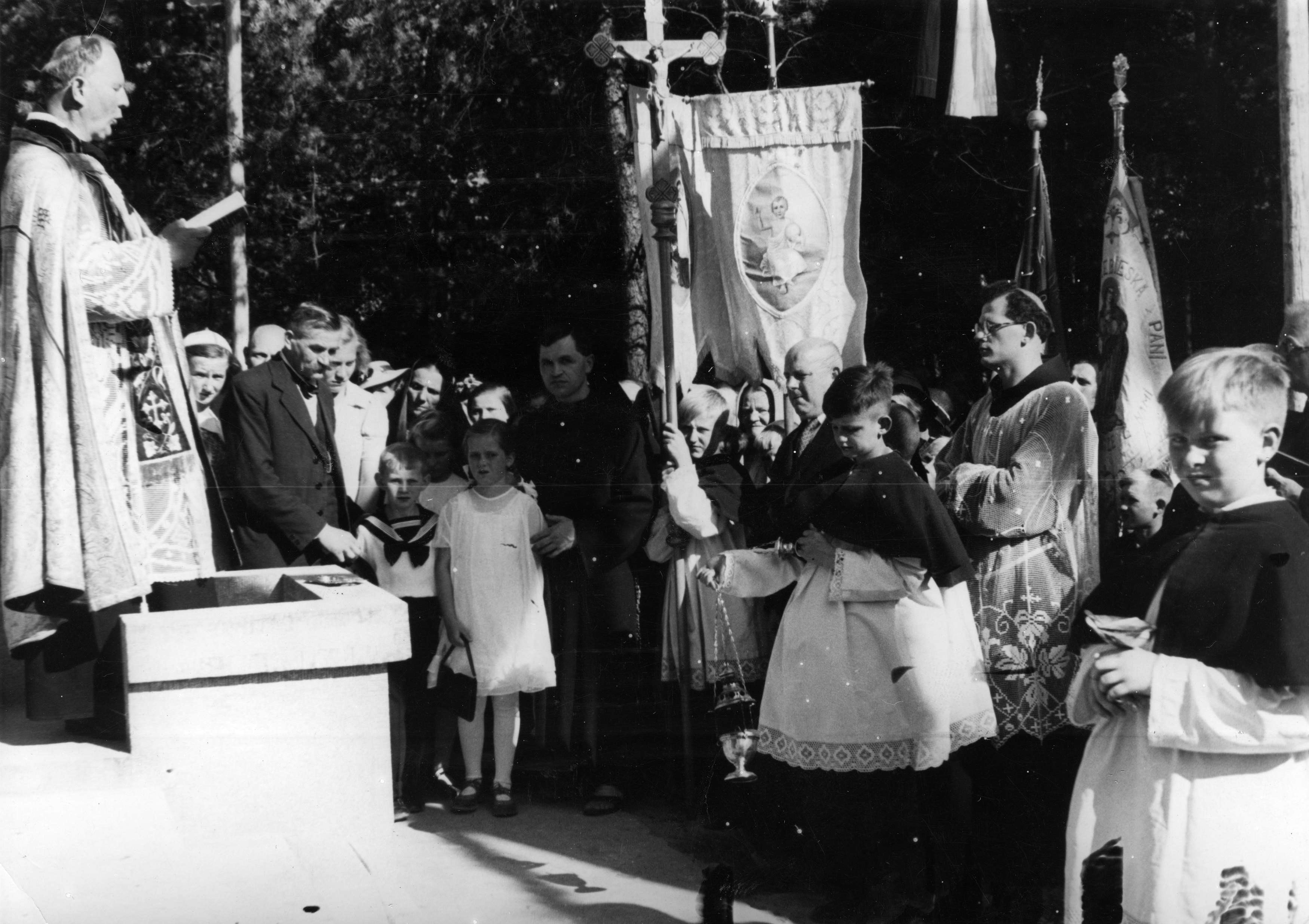
Consecration of the Pilate Chapel at Kalwaria Panewnicka by Father Karol Bik-Dzieszowski on 16 July 1939

In 1934, the parish community of St. Louis the King and the Assumption of the Blessed Virgin Mary in Panewniki was established, having been separated from the parish in Mikołów; between 1936 and 1958, Kalwaria Panewnicka was built on the grounds surrounding the monastery.

After the Germans occupied the present-day Ligota-Panewniki at the start of World War II, in September 1939 they murdered scouts and insurgents – defenders of Katowice – in the Panewniki Forests. After the war, their remains were exhumed and reburied in the cemetery on Panewnicka Street, and in 1961, a monument was unveiled at their mass grave. During the German occupation of Poland, many residents of Ligota and Panewniki perished, including the brothers Ludwik, Jan, and Wilhelm Wieczorek (Ludwik died in Buchenwald concentration camp in 1942, and the other two brothers died in 1944 in the Katowice prison). On 13 October 1944, scout activist Jan Giemza was shot at the edge of the Panewniki Forests.

During the occupation, underground activities flourished in Ligota-Panewniki. Among the most active groups since 1939 was the Polish Insurgent Organization, which was mainly operating in Ligota and Piotrowice. Ligota was also home to the organization's headquarters, led by Józef Pukowiec, the former commander of the Silesian Scout Brigade. The Red Army entered Ligota-Panewniki from the direction of Stara Ligota on 27 January 1945.

=== Post-war period ===
After the war ended, efforts began in Ligota and Panewniki to establish the structures of the new communist regime. The headquarters of the Polish United Workers' Party committee was initially located in a building at the intersection of Książęca and Piotrowicka streets. On 1 April 1951, the Katowice County was abolished, and with it Gmina Panewniki, which was incorporated into the city of Katowice. The Ligota-Południe District National Council operated from January 1955. During its operation, until 1973, it carried out several major projects, including the construction of a sports and recreation center with a swimming area on Wczasowa Street, a park and amphitheater in Zadole, and street lighting.

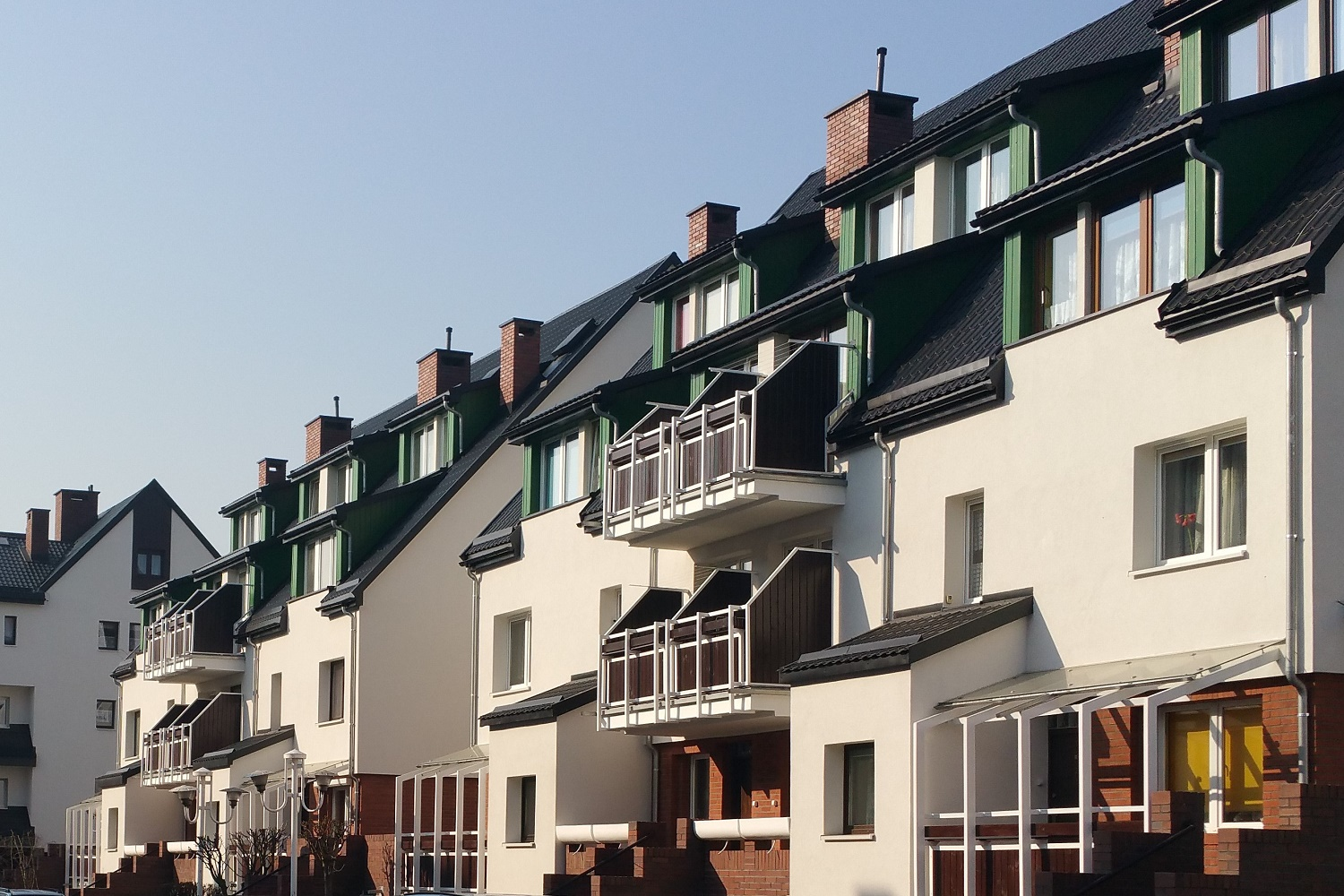
Sadyba housing estate built at the turn of the 1980s and 1990s

The Polish People's Republic period was also a time of many new developments in Ligota-Panewniki. In the early 1950s, construction began on a residential complex in Ligota designed to house several thousand residents in the area of Panewnicka, Piotrowicka, Zielonogórska, and Kołobrzeska streets; in 1959, Katowice's first "Millennium School" was completed. In the late 1960s, three dormitories for the University of Silesia were built. In the 1970s, a housing estate for employees of the Śląsk Coal Mine was erected in Kokociniec, and between 1980 and 1982, apartment buildings were constructed along the Kłodnica. In 1979, construction began on the clinical and teaching complex of the Medical University of Silesia at Medyków Street on the border of Ligota and Panewniki. At the turn of the 1980s and 1990s, the Sadyba housing estate was built in Kokociniec.

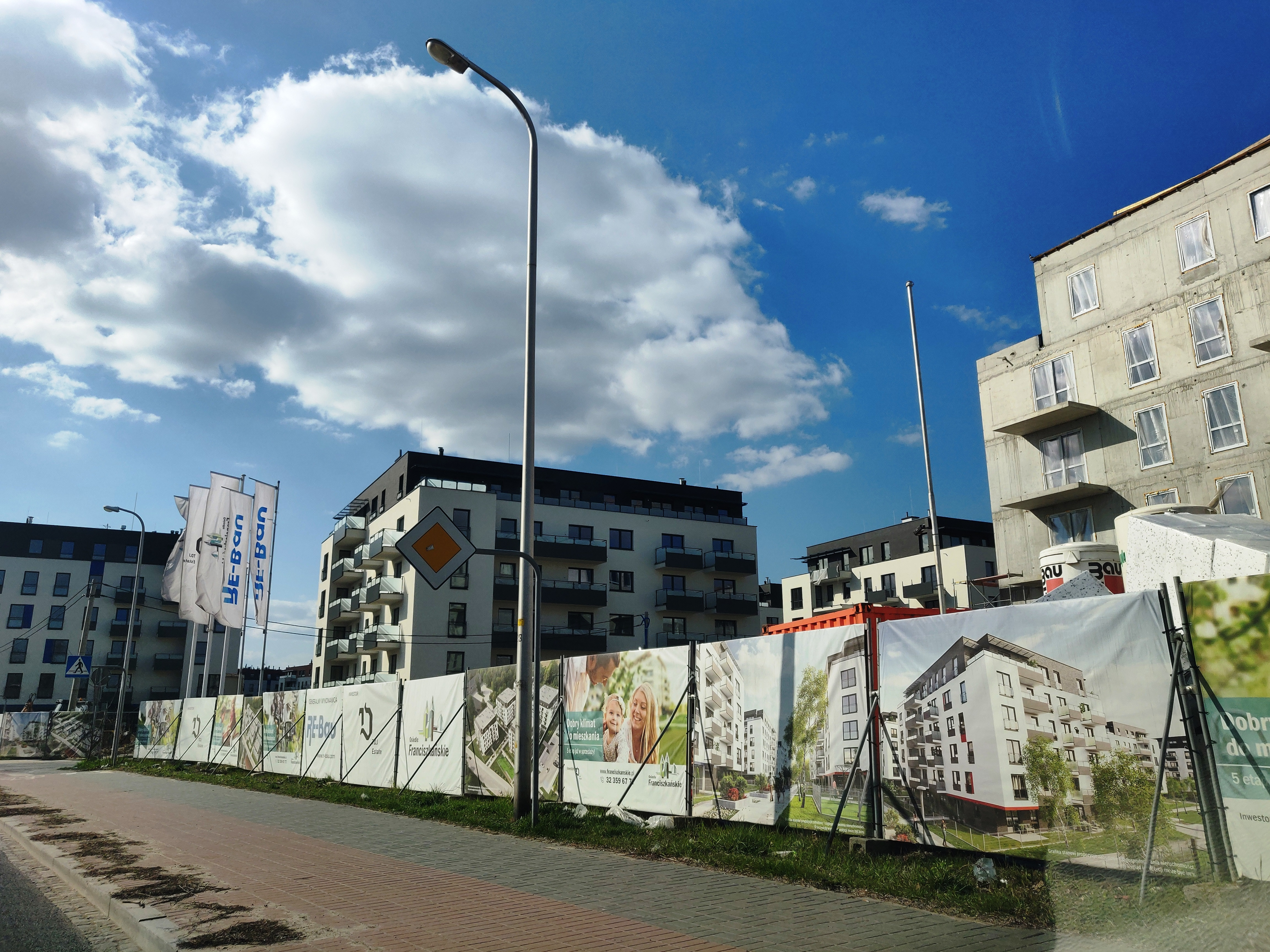
Construction of Osiedle Franciszkańskie on the former PEMUG site in April 2020

On 16 September 1991, the Katowice City Council adopted a resolution under which Katowice was divided into 22 auxiliary local government units on 1 January 1992, with their respective areas of operation defined. Thus, Local Government Unit No. 6, "Ligota – Panewniki", was established. The first elections to the Council of Auxiliary Unit No. 6 Ligota-Panewniki took place on 22 February 1994. Three years later, on 29 September 1997, as part of the administrative reform of Katowice, a new district – Załęska Hałda-Brynów – was separated from Ligota-Panewniki; the district includes, among other areas, part of Stara Ligota.

After 1989, many renovations and development projects were also carried out in Ligota-Panewniki. Among other things, the headquarters of the Ligota Municipal Cultural Center, the building of the former Panewniki Municipal Office, and a number of educational institutions in the district were renovated. The infrastructure of the main streets and sidewalks was expanded, and a new retail and service network also developed. Following this period, economic changes also took place in the district, linked to the restructuring of a number of enterprises in Ligota-Panewniki and the establishment of new ones. Near the intersection of Tadeusz Kościuszko and Kolejowa streets in the district, one of the largest retail and service complexes in Katowice was built – Libero Katowice – with its construction completed in November 2018.

After 1989, the construction of many new housing estates intensified in Ligota-Panewniki. Between 2007 and 2010, Osiedle Książęce was built in the area of the intersection of Książęca and Piotrowicka streets, and in October 2011, the design of this estate received the 2010 SARP Award of the Year. Between 2014 and 2022, another large housing estate – Osiedle Franciszkańskie – was also built near Kijowska Street.

== Demographics ==
Population structure in Ligota-Panewniki by gender and age (as of 31 December 2015)
Period/Number of inhabitants	pre-working age (0–18 years)	working age (18–60/65 years)	post-working age (over 60/65 years)	Total
Total	4,590	18,664	6,495	29,749
women	2,282	9,299	4,497	16,078
men	2,308	9,365	1,998	13,671
Femininity ratio	99	99	225	118

Some of the earliest demographic data on Ligota-Panewniki date back to the 16th century. Records from 1586 indicate that approximately 40 people lived in Panewniki, including 8 smallholders, while in 1620, there were 9, and in 1629, the first cotters appeared there. According to data from the Pszczyna urbarium of 1630, 9 smallholders lived in Panewniki, while in 1640 there were 10 smallholders and 4 cottagers. Ligota, on the other hand, was described in chronicles as an abandoned settlement in the 16th century and the first half of the 17th century, and it was repopulated in the second half of the 17th century. The first cotters began settling there in 1680. In 1718, there were 12 of them, and in 1740, 23.

The Carolinian Land Register from between 1723 and 1725 indicates that there were 11 peasant farms, 9 cotter farms, and 10 smallholder farms in Panewniki. By the end of the 18th century, Panewniki, together with Kokociniec and Wymysłów, had 10 smallholder farms, while Ligota had only 3 smallholder and cotter farms at that time. In 1783, 80 people lived in Ligota (including Kostuchna), while Panewniki had 145 inhabitants at that time.

At the beginning of the 19th century, almost all local residents and estate owners were Polish-speaking, while the lords and their officials were German-speaking.

In the first half of the 19th century, Ligota's population grew rapidly – in 1830, the settlement had 105 inhabitants, two years later 165, and in 1845, 215 people. This number continued to rise. In 1855, 442 people lived in Ligota, and in 1858, 535 people lived there, including 495 Catholics, 25 Lutherans, and 15 Jews. In 1861, Ligota had a population of 566, including 23 cotters, while in 1890, 683 people lived there, including 680 Catholics and 3 Evangelicals.

The population growth in Ligota at the beginning of the 20th century was mainly due to the development of local industry and the resulting influx of new residents who found employment in the newly established factories. In 1900, Ligota had a population of 1,117, in 1905, the population was 2,823 (or 1,823), in 1910, 4,125, and in 1923, 4,763. In 1980, approximately 25,000 people lived in the former Gmina Ligota.

The population of Panewniki has also been growing steadily since the 19th century. In 1855, a few years after the completion of the emancipation of the peasants in the Pszczyna land, 648 people lived in Panewniki. In 1855, this number rose to 648, and in 1858 to 672. At that time, there were 655 Catholics, 15 Lutherans, and 2 Jews living there. In 1861, 718 people lived in Panewniki, and in 1861 there were 718 people, including 12 smallholders and 40 cotters; in terms of religion, 702 Catholics and 14 Evangelicals lived there at that time. In 1861, the population of Panewniki rose to 718 people, and in 1890 to 770 residents; in terms of religion, there were 767 Catholics and 3 Evangelicals living there at that time.

In 1905, Panewniki had a population of 1,000, all of whom were Polish. In 1915, 1,405 people lived there, and in 1933, there were 2,338, including 2,316 Catholics, 14 Evangelicals, and 4 people of other faiths. In 1940, Panewniki had 3,738 inhabitants, in 1951 there were 3,859, and in 1980 there were 5,634, while at that time approximately 3,000 people lived in Kokociniec itself.

In 1988, the Ligota-Panewniki district had a population of 33,252. At that time, the largest group was people aged 15–29, while the smallest group was those over 60. At the end of December 2007, 31,879 people lived in the district, which at that time accounted for 10.1% of Katowice's population. At that time, this district was the most populous district in the city after Śródmieście, with a population density of 2,533 people per km², which was higher than the population density for the entire city, which stood at 1,916 people per km² at the time.

In 2005, Ligota-Panewniki had a population of 32,016, and between 2007 and 2011, the district's population showed fluctuating trends – in 2007, Ligota-Panewniki had 31,805 inhabitants, in 2010 this number dropped to 31,498, and in 2011 it rose to 31,387, with a population density at that time of 2,493 people per km². In 2010, 13.9% of the district's residents were of pre-working age, 67.5% were of working age, and 18.6% were of post-working age. At the end of 2013, the district had a population of 30,774, including 3,606 people aged 0–14 and 2,680 people aged 75 and older.

In a survey conducted in 2011 among a group of 116 residents of Ligota-Panewniki, 43.1% identified as Poles, 15.5% as Silesians, and 41.4% as both Poles and Silesians.

Sources: 1783 (including 80 in Ligota together with Kostuchna and 145 in Panewniki); 1855 (including 442 in Ligota and 648 in Panewniki); 1861 (including 566 people in Ligota and 718 in Panewniki); 1885 (1 December; including 658 people in Ligota and 790 in Panewniki); 1890 (including 683 in Ligota and 770 in Panewniki); 1905 (including 2,823 people in Ligota and 1,000 in Panewniki; or 1,823 people in Ligota); 1988; 2005 (31 December); 2010 (31 December); 2015 (31 December); 2020 (31 December).

== Politics and administration ==
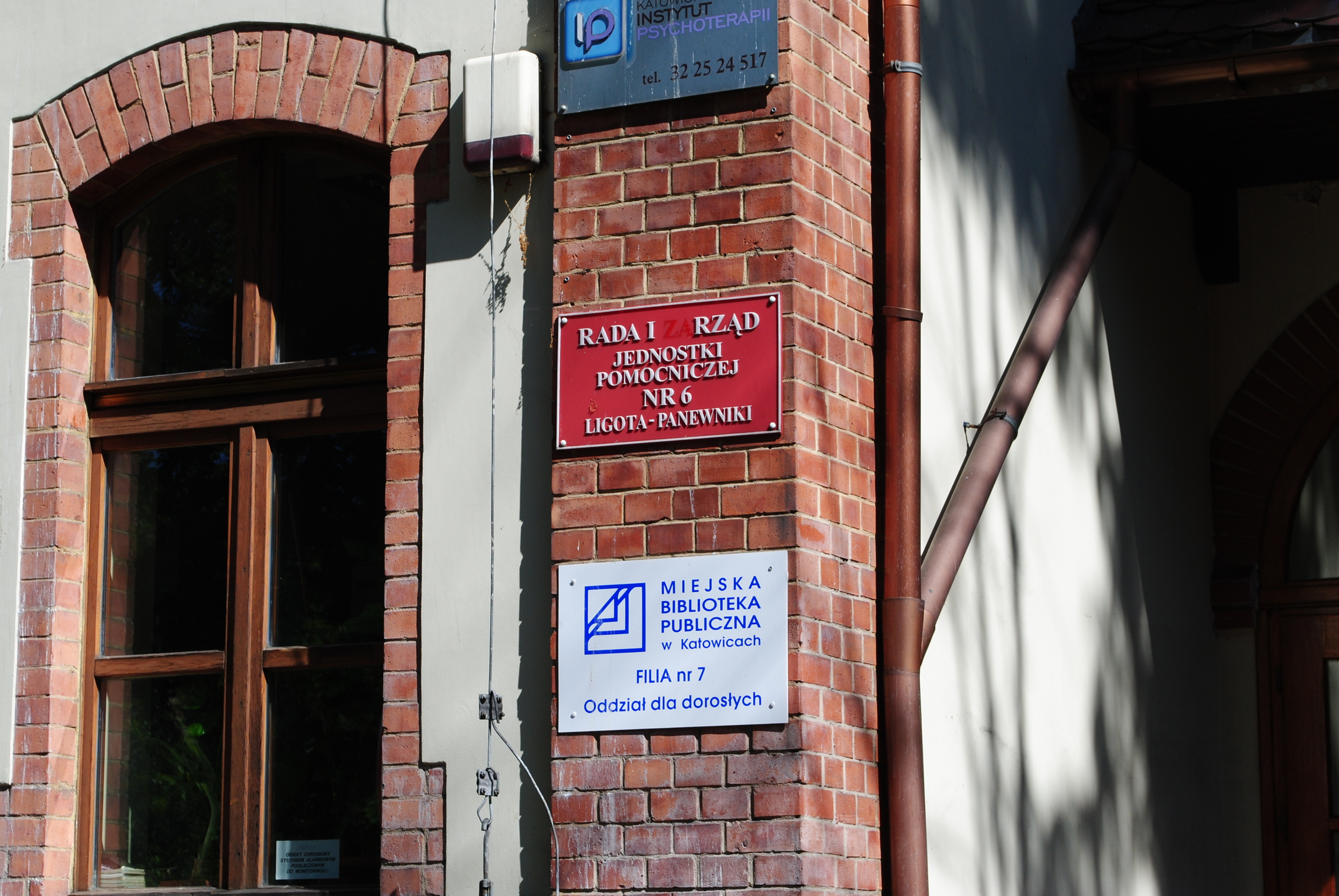
Notice board of the then Council and Board of Auxiliary Unit No. 6 Ligota-Panewniki (2021) at 25 Franciszkańska Street

District No. 6, Ligota-Panewniki, is one of the 22 districts of Katowice, constituting a local administrative unit of the gmina. It was established by a resolution of the Katowice City Council as Local Administrative Unit No. 6, Ligota-Panewniki, on 1 January 1992. According to Resolution No. XLVI/449/97 of the Katowice City Council of 29 September 1997, Ligota-Panewniki is a statutory district within the western district group. The current district statute was established by Resolution No. XLI/896/21 of the Katowice City Council of 25 November 2021. In accordance with the provisions of the statute, the district's governing bodies are the District Council and the District Executive Board. The District Council consists of 21 members elected for a five-year term. It is the district's decision-making body, and its tasks include, among others, submitting requests to the authorities of Katowice regarding proposals from district residents within the scope of its activities, initiating and organizing special events, cultural, sports, or recreational activities, providing opinions on local initiatives, and submitting proposals on city matters concerning Ligota-Panewniki. The District Executive Board, on the other hand, is the district's executive body. The Chair of the Executive Board represents the district externally, and the board's responsibilities include, among other things, accepting requests from district residents, organizing and coordinating community initiatives, informing residents about district matters, and preparing draft resolutions for the District Council.

Coat of arms of Ligota

Coat of arms of Panewniki

Ligota-Panewniki comprises two historical administrative units – the former gminas of Ligota and Panewniki. Historically, the district's territory came under the political jurisdiction of Silesia in the late 12th or early 13th century and was initially likely part of the castellania of Mikołów, but Pszczyna began to emerge as the dominant center as early as the 13th century. In 1337, the district's territory, along with the Duchy of Racibórz, came under the rule of Nicholas II of the Přemyslid dynasty. In 1375, John I – son of Nicholas II – transferred authority over the Pszczyna and Mikołów areas to the Duke of Opole, Vladislaus II, who ceded them to the Přemyslids by 1386. In later years, this land passed to various individuals.

In the early 16th century, representatives of two bourgeois families from Kraków – the Thurzós and the Salomons – took an interest in the Pszczyna lands due to the favorable conditions of the area, namely the presence of iron ore, hammer mills, and easily exploitable forest lands. In 1517, Alexius Thurzó purchased Pszczyna from Wenceslaus II, who later ceded the land to his brother Jan in 1525. In 1527, these lands were granted the status of a state country. In 1548, Jan Thurzó sold the Pszczyna estate to the Bishop of Wrocław, Baltazar Promnitz, and from that time until 1763, the Pszczyna lands were under the rule of the Promnitz family, and later the Anhalt-Cöthen family. The Hochbergs succeeded the Anhalt family. In 1847, following the death of Prince Henry von Anhalt-Cöthen, the Pszczyna estate was taken over by Jan Henryk X Hochberg.

In the 17th century, Panewniki had a gmina council headed by a wójt, while Ligota gained the status of an independent gmina in the early 18th century, with a sołtys appointed by the administration of the Duchy of Pless.

Gmina Ligota used a seal featuring a coat of arms with a deciduous tree in the center, two smaller trees on the right, and on the left a bird sitting on a stone, depicted in profile with its wings raised. Gmina Panewniki had seals with a coat of arms originally depicting a cauldron with a long handle standing on three legs on a wide base, with a fire beneath it. The emblem depicted only the cauldron with a long handle standing on three legs between 1863 and 1913.

After 1742, when Ligota-Panewniki became part of the Prussian state, counties were established in Upper Silesia, and the district's territories were incorporated into the Pszczyna County. On 1 January 1874, new administrative units, known as administrative districts (German: Amtsbezirk) were established in Silesia, encompassing several gminas and manorial estates. In the Pszczyna County, the following administrative districts were established, among others: the Piotrowice administrative district, encompassing, among others, the rural Gmina Ligota (the first head of the district held office in Mikołów), and the Śmiłowice administrative district with the rural Gmina Panewniki (the first official held office in Śmiłowice). On 1 May 1913, the new Ligota administrative district was formed from the gminas of Ligota and Panewniki.

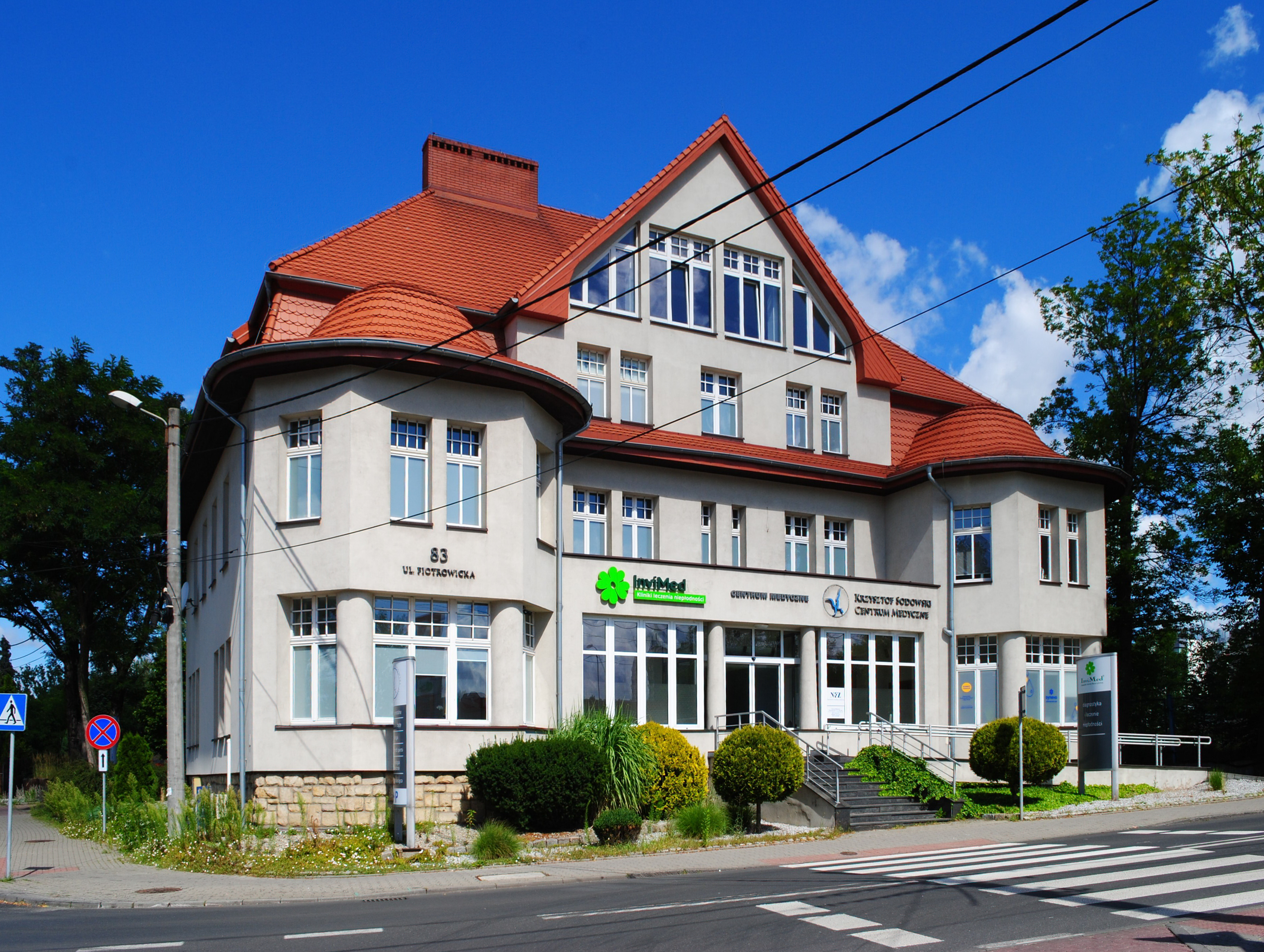
Former seat of Gmina Ligota (83 Piotrowicka Street)

In 1922, the present-day Katowice, along with the former gminas of Ligota and Panewniki, was incorporated into Poland and became part of the Pszczyna County in the autonomous Silesian Voivodeship. In 1923, the Panewniki Gmina Office at today's 75 Panewnicka Street was opened, and the Panewniki Gmina Office was moved there a year later. The new building also housed a post office. During the Polish People's Republic, it served, among other things, as the seat of the District National Council until 1973. By an act of the Silesian Parliament of 15 July 1924, it was decided to expand the boundaries of the city of Katowice to include the gminas of Bogucice, Brynów, Dąb (excluding Józefowiec), and Załęże from the Katowice County, as well as Ligota Pszczyńska from the Pszczyna County. This act came into force on 15 October 1924. The town hall of the former Gmina Ligota, prior to the district's incorporation into the city, was located at 83 Piotrowicka Street. Until 1924, it served as the seat of the Ligota Gmina Office, and later became a police station. At the beginning of the 21st century, the former town hall building housed a medical facility. In 1925, Katowice was divided into four districts, including the Ligota-Brynów district.

In 1936, the Duke of Pszczyna, Hans Heinrich XV von Hochberg, met with the Voivode Michał Grażyński to settle relations with the Polish state; a year later, he ceded part of his lands, and the Pszczyna fee tail was abolished.

Shortly before the outbreak of World War II, on 1 April 1938, Katowice was expanded to include parcels from the gminas of Piotrowice and Panewniki, with an area of 182.91 hectares. At that time, the territory of a single-family housing development and forests south of present-day Panewnicka Street and the vicinity of present-day Kolejowa Street were incorporated. Both gmias, by a decision of the Silesian Sejm of 7 March 1939, were excluded from the Pszczyna County on 1 April of that same year and incorporated into the Katowice County.

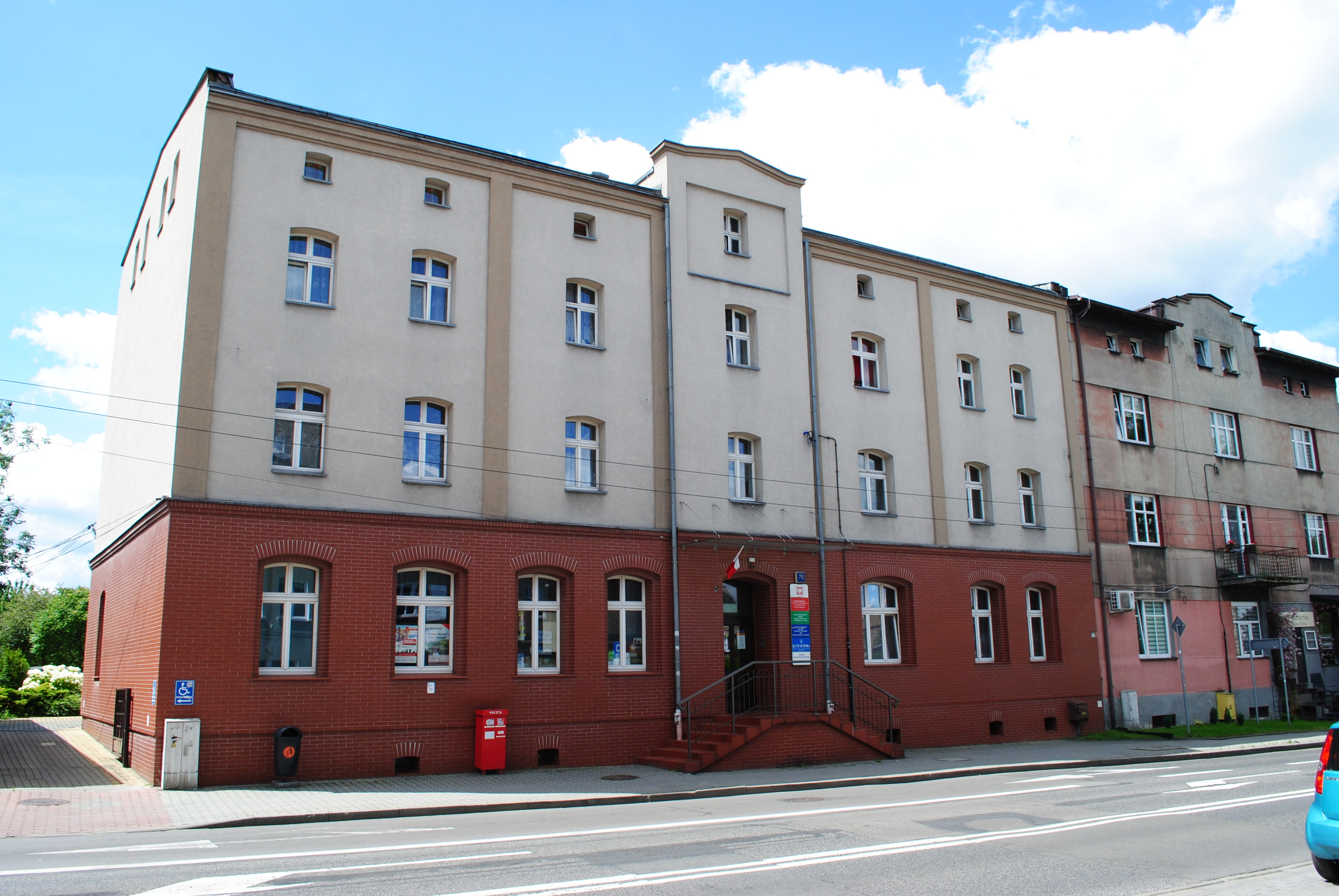
Former seat of Gmina Panewniki (75 Panewnicka Street)

After the occupation of Poland by the Third Reich, the new authorities restored the place names to their 1922 status, leaving intact all administrative changes that had taken place up to that point. During the war, there were also plans to change the name of Gmina Panewniki to Pfannendorf, and these changes were to be implemented after the war ended. On 3 February 1942, by decree of the Governor of the Province of Upper Silesia, the names of Katowice's districts were changed – among others, the district of Kattowitz-Idaweiche was established, encompassing Ligota.

After the Polish authorities took control of Upper Silesia in 1945, the legal status of Katowice as of 1 September 1939 was restored, and the changes made by the German occupation authorities were not recognized. Preparations were undertaken to transform the existing rural single-unit gminas into collective gminas divided into gromadas. Gmina Panewniki, located at that time in the Katowice County, was quite strong and financially self-sufficient, which is why it was not transformed. On 1 April 1951, the Katowice County was abolished, and with it, Gmina Panewniki was incorporated into the city of Katowice, becoming its part. By a resolution of the Voivodeship National Council in Stalinogród of 5 October 1954, Katowice was divided into three districts, including the Ligota district. The seat of the Presidium of the District National Council was initially located at 40 Panewnicka Street, and later operated at 33 Franciszkańska Street. In 1973, the division of Katowice into districts was abolished.

Local Government Unit No. 6 Ligota-Panewniki was established on 1 January 1992. The first elections to the Council of the Local Government Auxiliary Unit No. 6 Ligota-Panewniki were held on 22 February 1994; on 14 March of the same year, Local Government Auxiliary Unit No. 6 Ligota-Panewniki was established. In 1997, the administrative division of Katowice was reformed, separating the northern part of Ligota-Panewniki and establishing a new district – Załęska Hałda-Brynów – which encompassed Stara Ligota.

== Economy ==
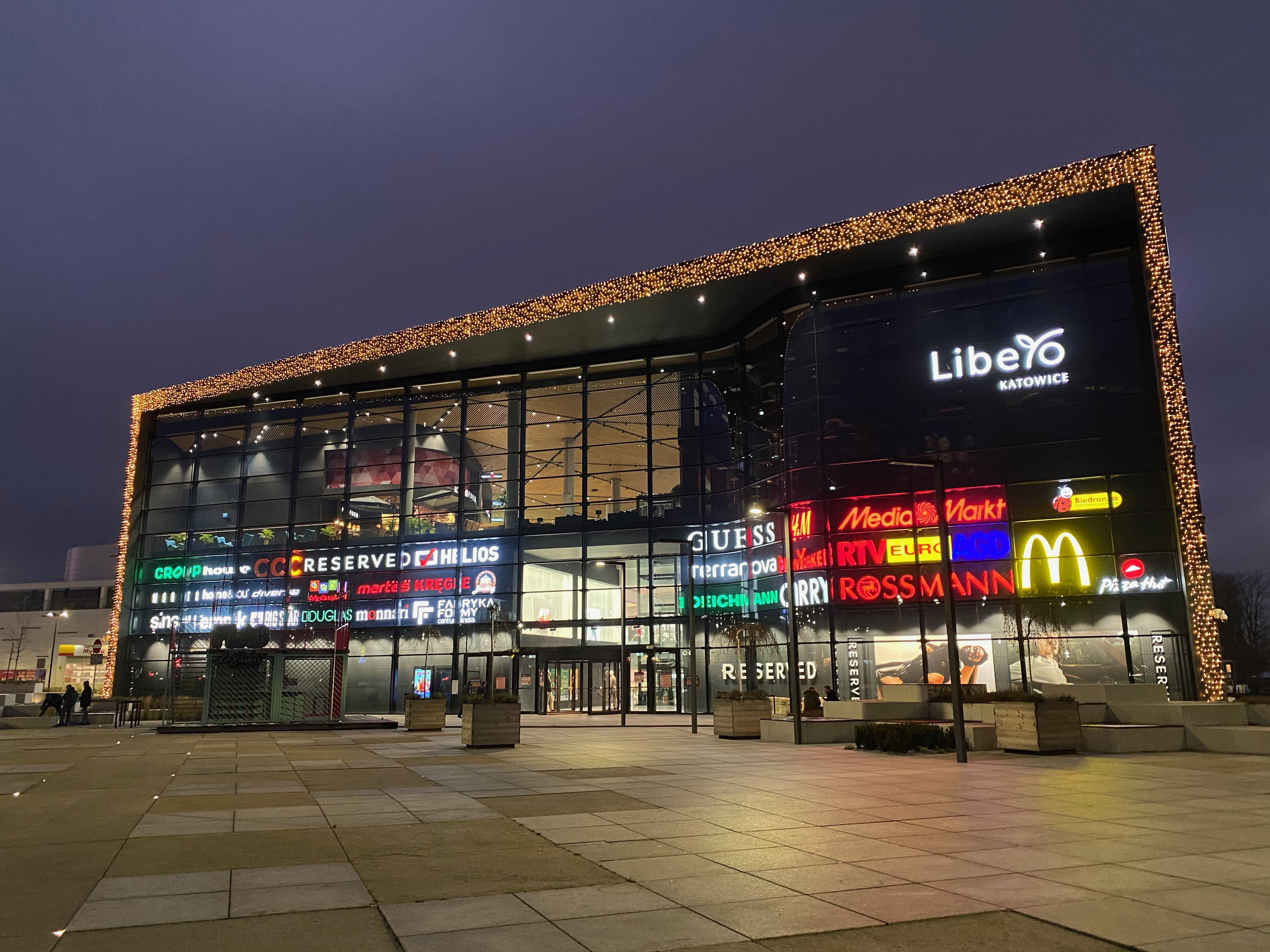
Libero Katowice at the boundary of Ligota-Panewniki and Piotrowice-Ochojec (229 Tadeusz Kościuszko Street)

Ligota-Panewniki is a mixed-use district, mainly residential and local commercial, with logistics, warehousing, and industrial functions serving as a significant complement to its economy. The district's industrial and service areas, including warehouses and railroad sidings, are concentrated mainly in several places, including Kolejowa Street, where, as of early 2023, logistics companies such as JAS-FBG (17 Kolejowa Street), Transbud-Katowice, and, in the vicinity at 1 Stalowa Street, the steel products distributor ArcelorMittal Distribution Solutions Poland have their seats. Other areas of concentrated economic activity include Piotrowicka and Książęca streets (Research and Development Center of Zakłady Remontowe Energetyki Katowice – 12 Książęca Street), A. Asnyk and Śląska streets (building products manufacturer Farby KABE Polska – 88 Śląska Street), and Owsiana Street (steel elements distributor Stalprofil – 60a Owsiana Street and automotive parts manufacturer Autoneum Poland – 60a Owsiana Street).

The Libero Katowice shopping center is located on Tadeusz Kościuszko Street in Ligota-Panewniki. The mall consists of over 150 stores and service outlets, as well as a food court. It also has cultural and recreational facilities, including a Helios cinema, a bowling alley, and a fitness center.

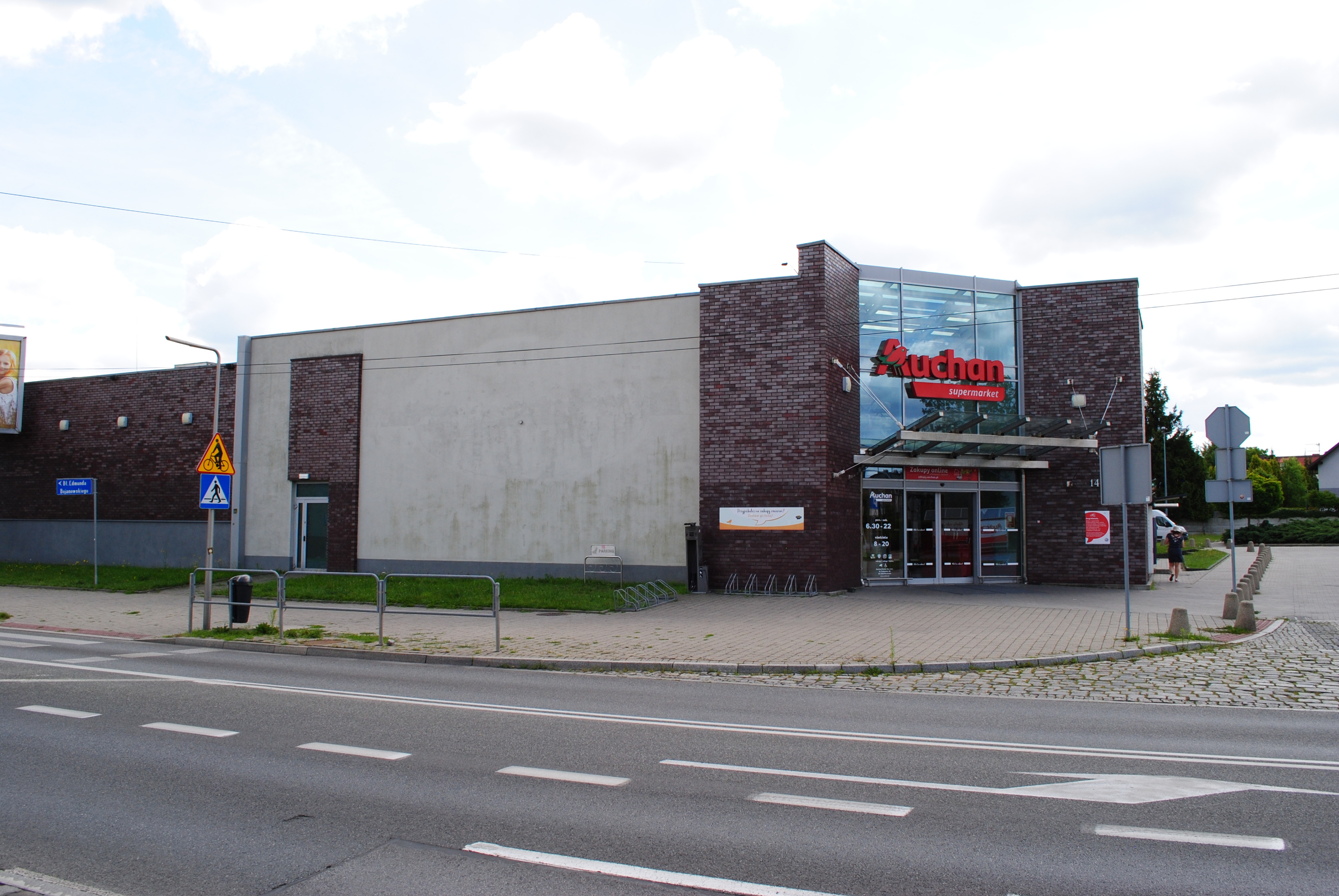
Auchan store (172 Panewnicka Street)

The district has also seen the emergence of important local service and commercial centers, dominated by retail and basic services. Four such centers have developed in Ligota-Panewniki: Zadole (the area of Zadole, Zielonogórska, Kołobrzeska, and Gorzowska streets), Panewniki (intersection of Panewnicka, Medyków, and Kijowska streets), Kokociniec (between Kijowska and Mała streets), and Ligota (Panewnicka Street from Franciszkańska Street to Mazowiecka Street, Piotrowicka Street from Franciszkańska Street to Słupska Street, Franciszkańska Street, and Grunwaldzka Street).

At the end of 2013, there were 4,058 businesses registered in the REGON system with headquarters in Ligota-Panewniki (8.9% of all companies in Katowice; the highest percentage after Śródmieście), of which 3,895 were micro-enterprises (127 entities per 1,000 residents). At the end of 2013, there were 801 registered unemployed residents living in Ligota-Panewniki, which at the time accounted for 2.6% of the district's population.

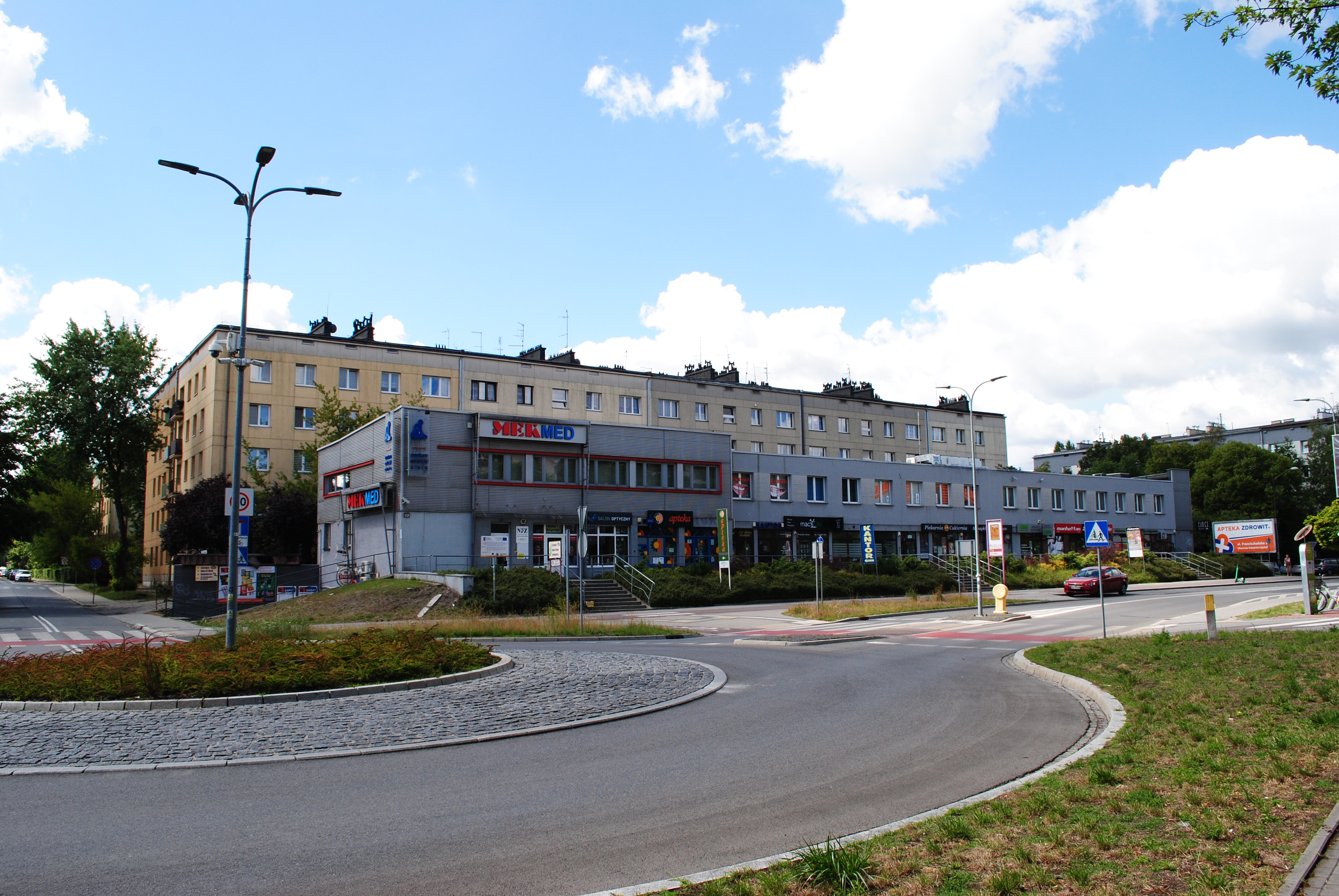
Retail and service pavilions at Panewnicka Street in Nowa Ligota

Historically, one of the first craft workshops in Ligota-Panewniki was the hammer mill in Kokociniec. It was established in the early 17th century, while according to Lech Szaraniec and Ludwik Musioł, it was founded in 1650. It was located on the shore of a hammer mill pond, formed by damming the waters of the Kokociniec Stream and the Kłodnica river, and was one of four such facilities operating at various times within the Duchy of Pless. It was not a large establishment – it was equipped with a low electric arc furnace, and in 1670, 440 buckets of iron ore were smelted there. Until 1670, it was leased by a private blacksmith, and later came under the administration of the Pszczyna estate. Production at the Kokociniec hammer mill ceased at the beginning of the 18th century.

In the 19th century, the impact of industrialization on the development of Ligota-Panewniki, as well as other southern districts of Katowice, was less significant than in other parts of the city. At that time, the area belonged to the Duchy of Pless and developed at a much slower pace than the rest. There was only one ironworks operating in Gmina Panewniki commune, Ida Iron Works, for which coal was mined by the nearby Szadok mine. Two craft workshops and two inns were also in operation in the 19th century. No company town was built here. At the turn of the 19th and 20th centuries, Panewniki remained an agricultural community. At that time, the population made a living from farming, and some residents also took jobs in the nearby mines – especially at Oheim Coal Mine and Cleophas Coal Mine – and in the surrounding ironworks and industrial plants. At that time, apart from small craft workshops, there was no industry there. Thanks to the construction of the Franciscan monastery complex in Panewniki between 1905 and 1908, and the accompanying growth of pilgrimage traffic, trade and restaurants began to develop in the region.

Ligota initially developed as an agricultural village with a mill and an inn. Rye, barley, and oats were grown there, as well as sweet flag, peas, and hops. From the 19th century onward, it transformed into a resort village.

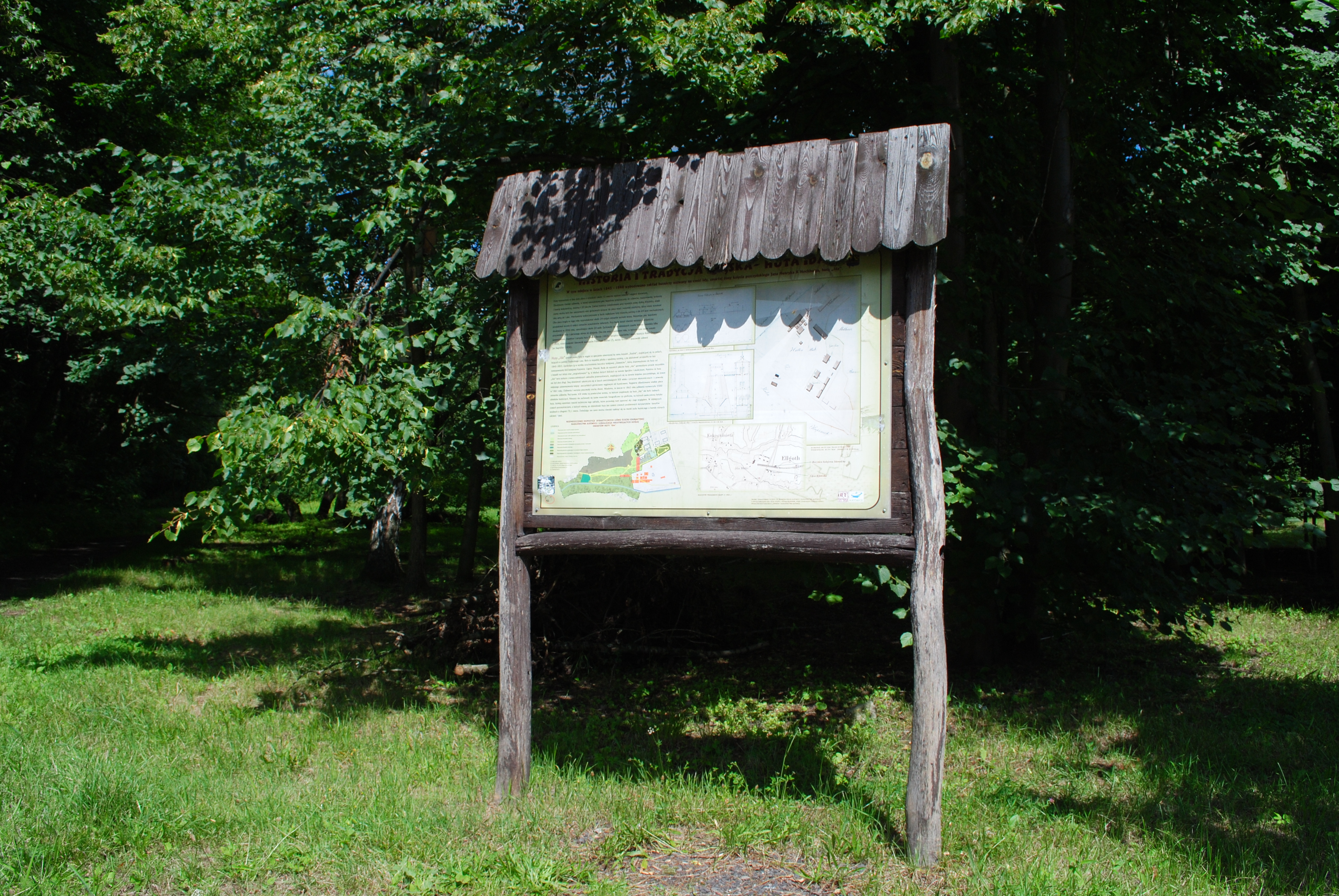
Information board about the former Ida Iron Works at Kijowska Street

The Ida Iron Works operated for only 13 years – from 1848 to 1861 – and was located on present-day Kijowska Street in Kokociniec, next to the headquarters of the Katowice Forest District. The main part of the plant consisted of two coke-fired blast furnaces with adjacent charging towers and casting halls where pig iron was tapped. Iron ore for the smelter was sourced from nearby mines, as well as from small deposits located in the Ligota forests. A foundry began operations in 1855; by 1858, 28 people were employed at the Ida Iron Works, and production that year totaled 19,014 hundredweights of pig iron. The ironworks lagged behind other Upper Silesian facilities of this type in terms of equipment, and at that time, the Duke of Pszczyna also decided to focus his activities on the mining industry. Ultimately, in 1861, the blast furnaces at the ironworks were shut down, and at the turn of the 19th and 20th centuries, all production buildings of the former Ida Iron Works were demolished.

The Szadok Coal Mine operated in Kokociniec from 1845 to 1853. Its exact location is unknown, but it is estimated that it was situated in the area of the present-day Sadyba housing estate. It was established to supply coal to the nearby Ida Iron Works. In 1849, it supplied 6,100 tons of coal. The mine was shut down in 1853 – work was briefly resumed between 1881 and 1883. Since the Ida Iron Works had not been in operation since 1862, the reactivated mine produced only about 500 tons of coal annually for local needs. It was finally closed in 1897. In the 1970s, a new, large mine, known as Panewniki or Radoszowy, was planned for this area. Construction began as the Western Field of the Wujek Coal Mine, but ultimately only one shaft was built, named Radoszowy, which became the shaft of the nearby Śląsk Coal Mine.

The construction and expansion of the railway running through Ligota significantly contributed to the development of industry and construction in the area. Ligota transformed from an agricultural center into an industrial settlement. Industrial plants were established in the area of the railway spur built in 1851 to the Ida Iron Works (along the current T. Szurman and Książęca streets). After the ironworks was closed, the spur was not dismantled, and other plants began to be built along it. Industry in Ligota developed particularly intensively until World War I; after that time, no major investments were carried out there.

From the late 19th century, the Silesia Chemical Factory operated on present-day Piotrowicka Street, at the site where the Netto grocery store is located today. Among other things, it produced hydrochloric acid and sodium sulfate. This factory was one of the largest chemical plants in the region. It existed until the 1960s, and the only remnant of it was the building at 100 Piotrowicka Street, which was demolished in 2017. Nearby was the Ligota Chemical Factory (Refinery), which initially produced oxygen and hydrogen; after being converted into a refinery, it processed kerosene, mineral oils, and machine greases. After World War II, the site housed CPN fuel depots, and later an Orlen base.

In the vicinity of the siding leading to the former Ida Iron Works, in the area of Książęca Street, the Ligota Sawmill was established in the 1920s, mainly to serve the mines of the Duchy of Pless. A branch of the Kuźnia Ustroń foundry was located at the same siding, where submarine equipment was manufactured during World War II. The facility remained in operation until the 1960s.

In the interwar period, a facility belonging to the Poznań Society of Engineering Works (with its own railway siding) was established on Stara Kłodnicka Street – later becoming the Silesit Aggregate Production Plant, and after the war, a fuel depot and a building materials warehouse. In the vicinity of the plant, the Wilczek Technical Fats Factory was established, followed by Walenty Jerzykiewicz's factory producing mineral paints, and after the war, the Barwint Workers' Cooperative, later P. P. Mikrogran. Further east, Franciszek Czaja established a fish smokehouse that operated until the 1990s. At the turn of the 1920s and 1930s, the Dissous Gas Plant was established on present-day Kolejowa Street, followed by Gazakumulator. Toward the end of its existence, in the early 21st century, it was part of Polgaz.

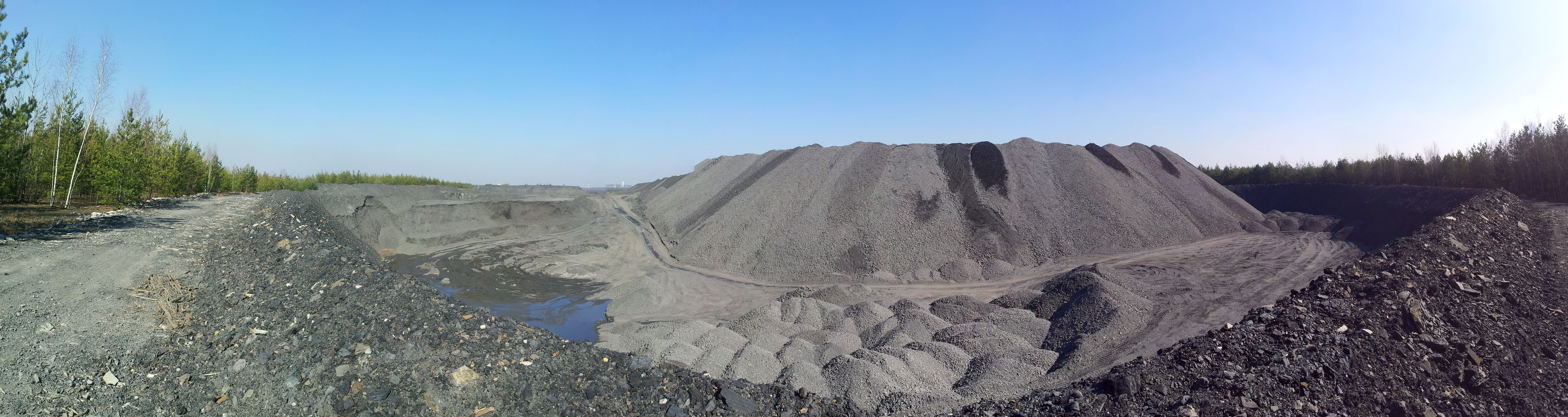
Part of Panewniki Spoil Tip created on the site of the former Panewniki sand mine

The Panewniki sand mine operated in the Panewniki Forests on the border between Katowice and Mikołów, extracting raw materials from 1936 to 1960 to supply the Wujek Coal Mine. The first plans to build a new sand mine connected to the Wujek mine by a double-track narrow-gauge railway were developed by the management of the Hohenlohe Works in the 1920s. The line was built between 1936 and 1938, and the mine covered an area of 540 hectares at that time. In 1952, the mine supplied 574,000 m³ of sand, which was transported to the ventilation shafts of the Wujek mine and the floor opening of the Kleofas No. 2 mine. At that time, the area of what was then the largest sand pit in Katowice was 609 ha. Over time, sand deliveries from Panewniki failed to meet the needs of the Wujek mine, which is why a standard-gauge belt railway was built to it. Sand was extracted in Panewniki until 1960, and after its closure, the area was reclaimed.

During the Polish People's Republic, industrial development continued in Ligota-Panewniki. The site of the Ligota Sawmill was taken over by the Mining Equipment Assembly Company (later the Steel Structures and Mining Equipment Assembly Company, with its own vocational school, initially located on Kijowska Street and later on Książęca Street), established in 1951 on the basis of the Mining Equipment and Mine Dust Collector Factory, which had been transformed into the Main Mechanical and Boiler Workshops in 1948. In the vicinity of PEMUG, the Energomontaż Południe Transport Base and the Coal Industry Power Equipment Installation Company Base were established.

One of the largest companies operating in Ligota-Panewniki during the Polish People's Republic era was Centrostal Górnośląski, founded in 1945 on Stalowa Street, which dealt in the trade of steel products on the domestic and foreign markets. Also operating in the vicinity during that period were: chemical warehouses (19 Kolejowa Street) and the Industrial Construction Transport Base – later Transbud-Katowice (17 Kolejowa Street). In the 1970s, a factory producing prefabricated concrete panel house components was in operation in Stare Panewniki, in the area of Kuźnicza and Owsiana streets. After 1989, new companies were established in place of the Panewniki House Factory, including PBU Panewnik in 1992, which produces prefabricated concrete and reinforced concrete components.

The modern period, beginning in the 1990s, is characterized by the decline of Katowice's resource-based urban drivers, the gradual phasing out of disruptive industrial functions, the revitalization of post-industrial areas, and the dismantling of a significant portion of the city's rail sidings. This was also a time of transformation for large enterprises in Ligota-Panewniki, including the restructured PEMUG and the liquidated WIMACH, as well as the site of the former House Factory. Since the political transformation, most of the local industrial areas have been successively developed with new residential projects, gradually transforming Ligota-Panewniki into a residential center, including the Osiedle Franciszkańskie built on the site of the former PEMUG company. During the political transformation of the 1990s, the number of grocery stores and service establishments in the district increased. New pharmacies also appeared, as well as fast-food restaurants.

== Technical infrastructure ==
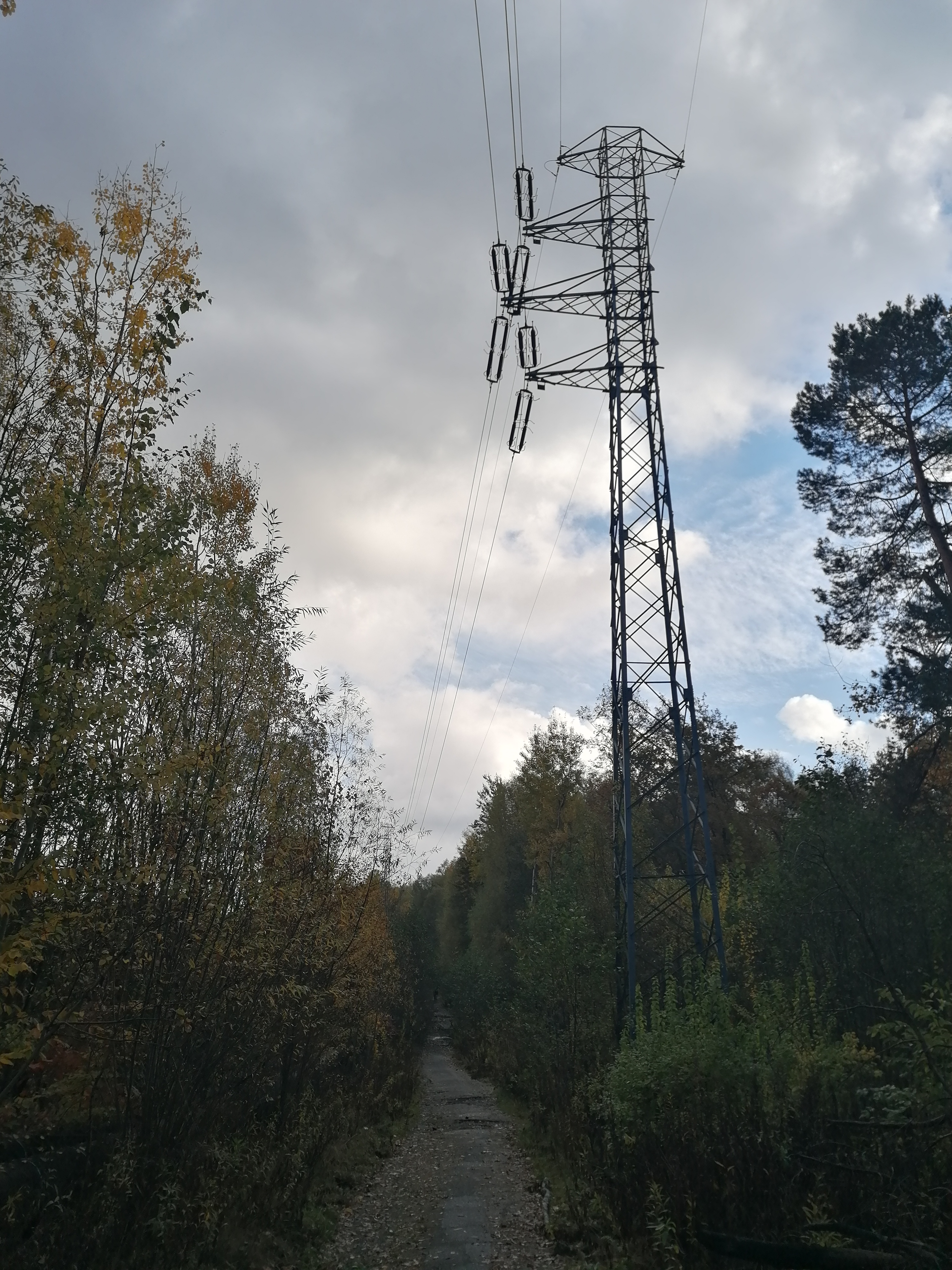
Electricity pylon in Panewniki Forests

The supply of running water to Ligota-Panewniki is provided through network reservoirs in Mikołów and Murcki. These are fed from water treatment plants in Dziećkowice Lake, Goczałkowice-Zdrój, and Kobiernice. This water is pumped into the common distribution system of the Upper Silesian Waterworks Company, from where Ligota-Panewniki is supplied with water via the main water mains and distribution network of Katowice Waterworks. Ligota-Panewniki is intersected by the GPW transit water main running meridionally near Wymysłów. The main water pipes of Katowice Waterworks run along the district's major streets, one of which is the 500-mm-diameter Panewniki–Ligota water main.

In 1931, an underground reservoir with a pressure tank was constructed beneath the northern part of Karol Miarka Square, enabling the supply of water to the southern part of the city, including Ligota. It was put into service in 1932. In 1937, a water main with a diameter of 400/350/300 mm was laid along the route from the Dąb pumping station to Załęże, the Wujek Coal Mine, Ligota, Ochojec, and Piotrowice.

The sanitary and combined sewer systems in the district are operated by the Sewer Network Operations Branch – South, which is part of Katowice Waterworks, the storm sewer system is managed by the Municipal Roads and Bridges Authority in Katowice. The district lies entirely within the catchment area of the Panewniki Wastewater Treatment Plant, which is located at 330 Panewnicka Street, but within the territory of neighboring Ruda Śląska. The Panewniki Wastewater Treatment Plant serves Panewniki, Ligota, part of Ochojec, and the eastern part of Brynów. Approximately 50,000 people in the 661-hectare catchment area are connected to it. The plant is owned by the Katowice Investments company (formerly Katowice Water and Sewage Infrastructure), and its operator is Katowice Waterworks.

A combined sewer system is found in parts of the district with older buildings, and these are mainly the oldest sewers, built between 1929 and 1935 or in the 1960s and 1970s. Most of them are in poor technical condition; at the beginning of the 21st century, the most damaged ones were those in the area of J. K. Chodkiewicz and Śląska streets. The distribution sewer system (sanitary and stormwater) in Ligota-Panewniki is found mainly in residential areas developed in the second half of the 20th century – in Wymysłów and Kokociniec. The age of the sewers in the catchment area of the Panewniki Wastewater Treatment Plant varies, with a predominance of those built in the 1960s and 1980s. Their deteriorating technical condition is mainly due to their age, mining damage, and geological conditions (quicksand).

The sewer system in Ligota was built in the early 1930s. The Panewniki Wastewater Treatment Plant was commissioned in the 1960s as a mechanical treatment plant mainly to treat wastewater from earlier residential developments, mostly in Ligota, and a sewer line running from Ligota also enabled Panewniki to be connected to the treatment plant.

The district is supplied with electricity via a 110-kV high-voltage grid connected to nearby power plants. This network crosses Ligota-Panewniki between Wymysłów and Kokociniec, and the Ligota 110/20 kV substation is located near the hospital complex of the Medical University of Silesia. In December 2004, it was operating at 35% capacity. The overhead power grid is managed by Polskie Sieci Elektroenergetyczne.

Ligota was electrified in 1913 and was supplied by Überlandwerk Ellgoth GmbH (Ligota Regional Power Plant), established in 1917. In 1934, this company was absorbed by the Elektro Works. It operated transmission lines, including the 20 kV line between Boże Dary, Murcki, Ligota, and Panewniki. The electricity distributed at that time came from the mining power plants of the Duchy of Pless, and partly from the Elektro Works and the Silesia Coal Mine.

Part of Ligota is supplied with heat from Division No. VI Wujek of the former ZEC Katowice (now Dalkia Polska Energia), while part of that section of the district, as well as part of Panewniki, remains outside the coverage area of Katowice's district heating systems.

The district is supplied with high-methane natural gas (GZ-50), while Katowice's gas supply system does not have its own sources and is supplied by nationwide networks. The gasification of Ligota began gradually in the 1960s and 1970s.

== Transport ==
=== Road transport ===
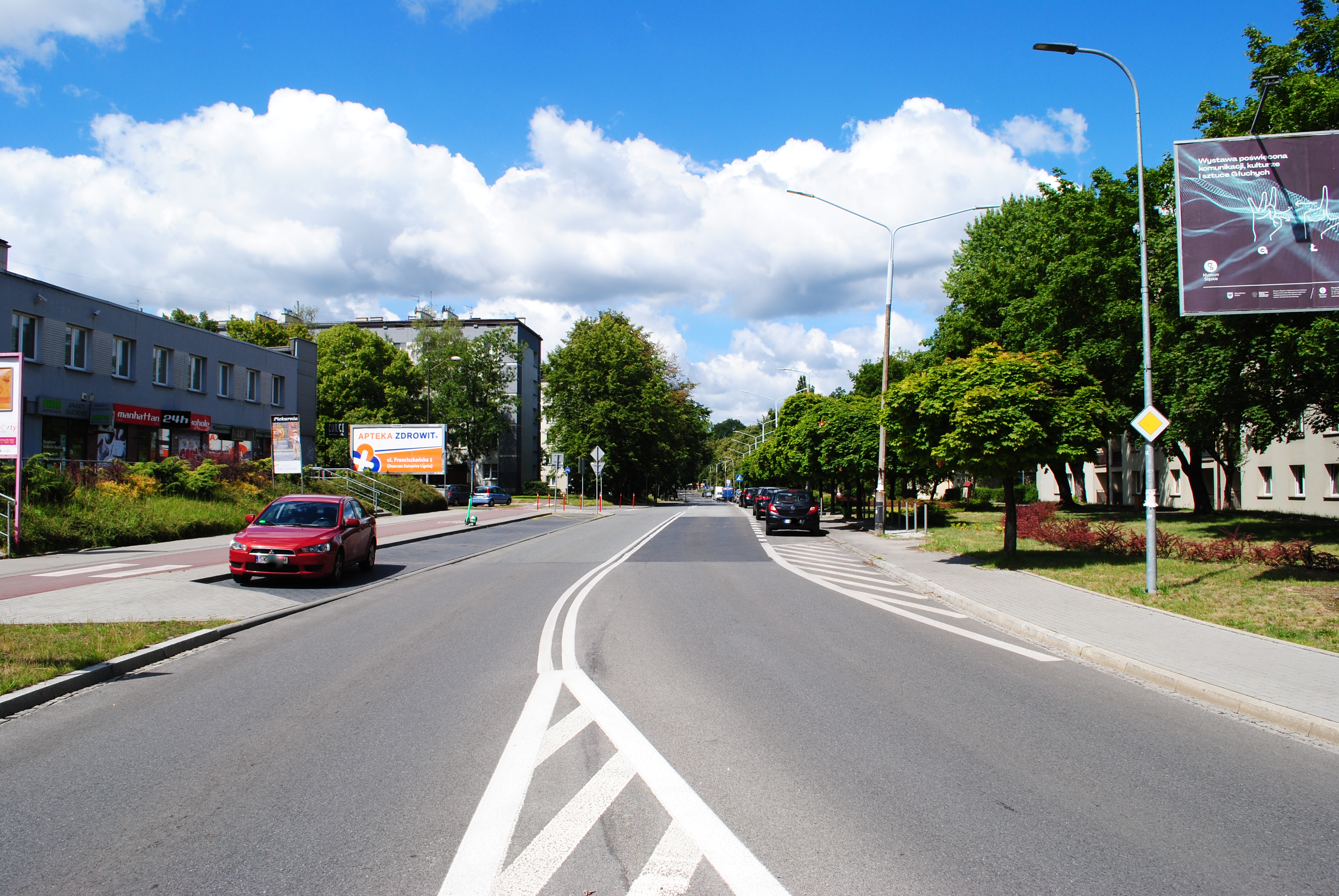
Part of Panewnicka Street in the area of Nowa Ligota (view westward)

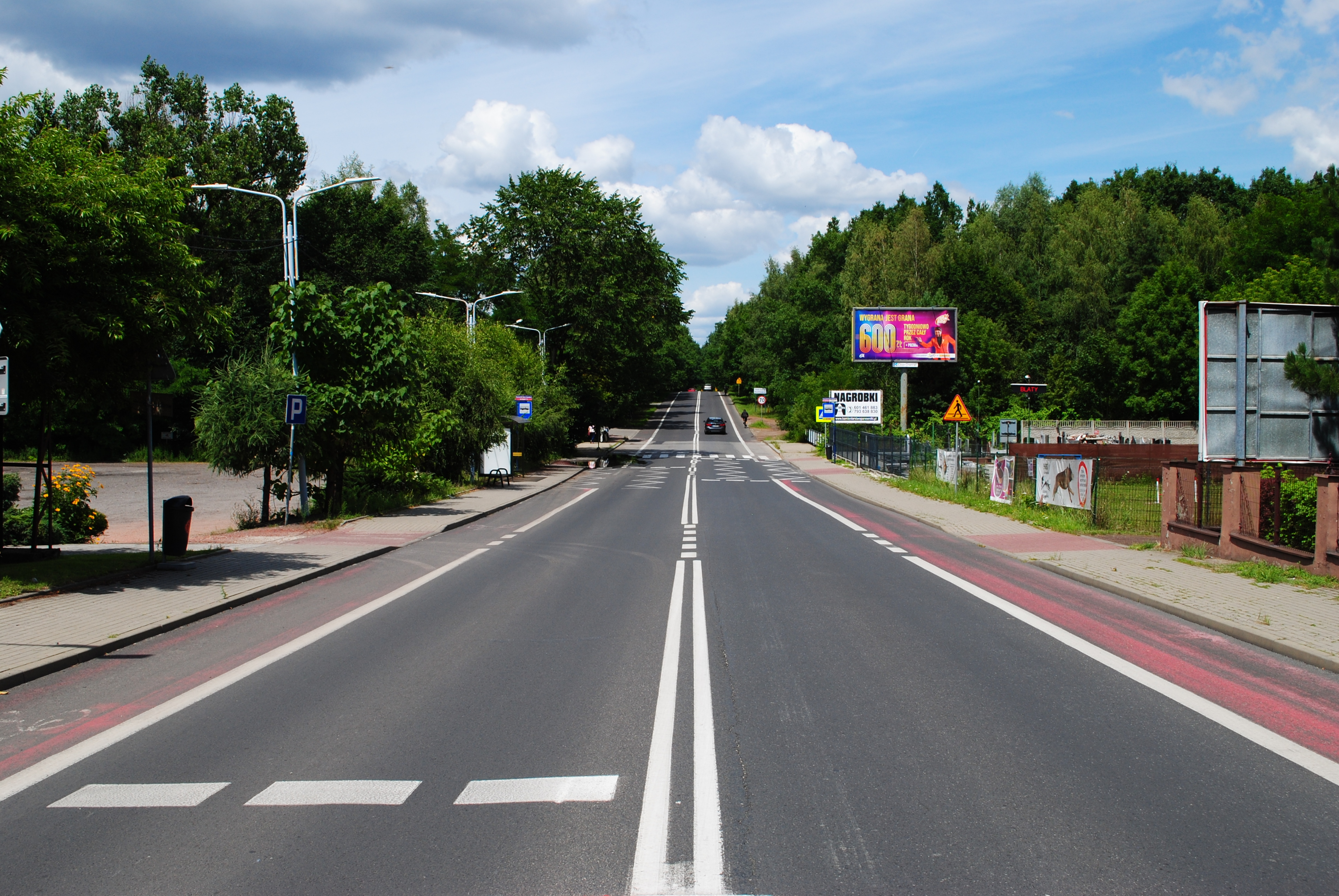
Part of Panewnicka Street at the boundary of Katowice and Ruda Śląska

No trunk or voivodeship roads run through Ligota-Panewniki. The following roads are among the major streets running through the district:

- Franciszkańska Street – a local road in the central part of the district, located in Nowa Ligota, running almost entirely in a roughly parallel direction, directly connecting the Ligota railway station at Katowice Ligota railway station in the east with the grounds of the Panewniki monastery complex in the west. It is a local county road;
- Kijowska Street – a road in the central part of the district, running northward from Nowe Panewniki to Kokociniec through Osiedle Franciszkańskie. It is a distributor county road;
- Kłodnicka Street – a road in the eastern part of Ligota-Panewniki, running approximately parallel to the latitude lines. It connects Nowa Ligota with Brynów in the vicinity of the Brynów Transit Center in Piotrowice-Ochojec. It is a local county road;
- Panewnicka Street – one of the most important roads in the district, approximately 5 km long. It runs roughly parallel to the latitude across the entire district and connects this part of Katowice with Ruda Śląska. It is a distributor county road;
- Piotrowicka Street – a road in the central part of Ligota-Panewniki, running roughly along a meridian. It connects Stara Ligota in the north with Piotrowice in the south via Nowa Ligota and Zadole. It is a distributor county road.

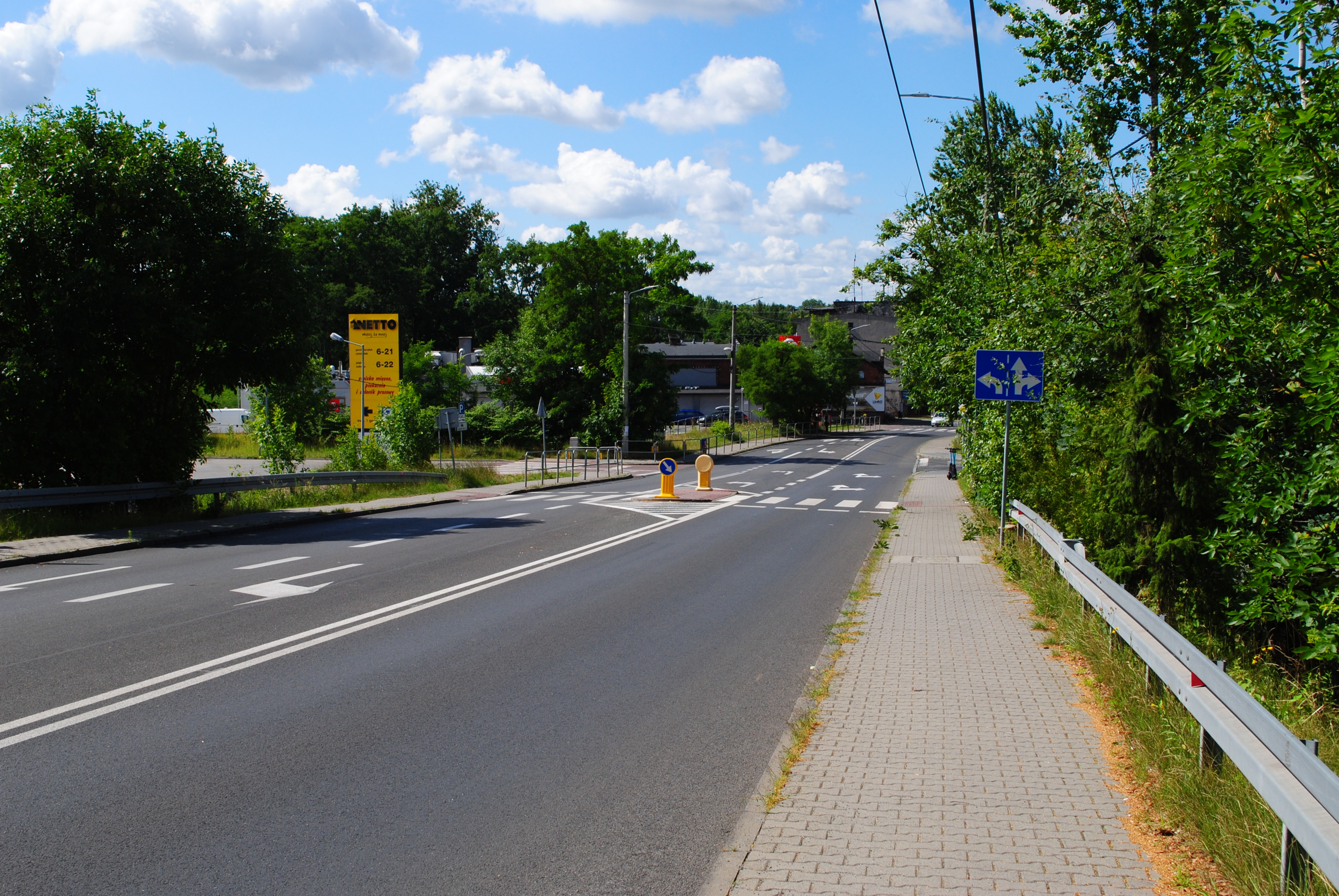
Part of Piotrowicka Street (view towards Nowa Ligota)

Of the roads listed above, the district's connectivity is mainly provided by Piotrowicka Street (connection to Tadeusz Kościuszko Street via Armii Krajowej Street, and connection to Brynowska Street via Rolna and Ligocka streets) and Panewnicka Street (connection to Tadeusz Kościuszko Street via Kłodnicka Street or Kolejowa Street, and also via Owsiana Street). In terms of internal connections between the individual macroregions of Katowice, Ligota and Brynów have very good links with the city center – access is possible via two street routes: Ligocka–Mikołowska and Rolna streets (or Kłodnicka–Tadeusz Kościuszko streets). Regarding links to other macroregions, the quality of connections is insufficient between Bogucice and Pniaki, as well as between Józefowiec and Koszutka, while the quality of connections is very good between Piotrowice and Kostuchna. The travel time by car during rush hour from Stare Panewniki to the center of Katowice is approximately 20 minutes, and from Ligota approximately 10–15 minutes.

A major issue with the Ligota-Panewniki road network is the heavy traffic on the main streets, especially during the morning and afternoon rush hours, which makes it difficult to reach the center of Katowice. A partial solution to the problem was the so-called Panewniki bypass, opened in 2013, which connects Panewnicka Street with the A4 motorway near the Chorzów Batory interchange. The roads most heavily burdened by private vehicle traffic in 2008 included the following street sections in Ligota-Panewniki: Piotrowicka–Panewnicka–Krucza–J. Wybicki–St. Hadyna, Franciszkańska–Kolejowa/Kłodnicka, and Piotrowicka (from Zadole towards Piotrowice-Ochojec) and Śląska streets. Another problem with the district's road network is the lack of parking lots and parking spaces, and with the development of new housing estates, traffic through these areas has also become an issue due to the congestion forming in their vicinity.

=== Rail transport ===
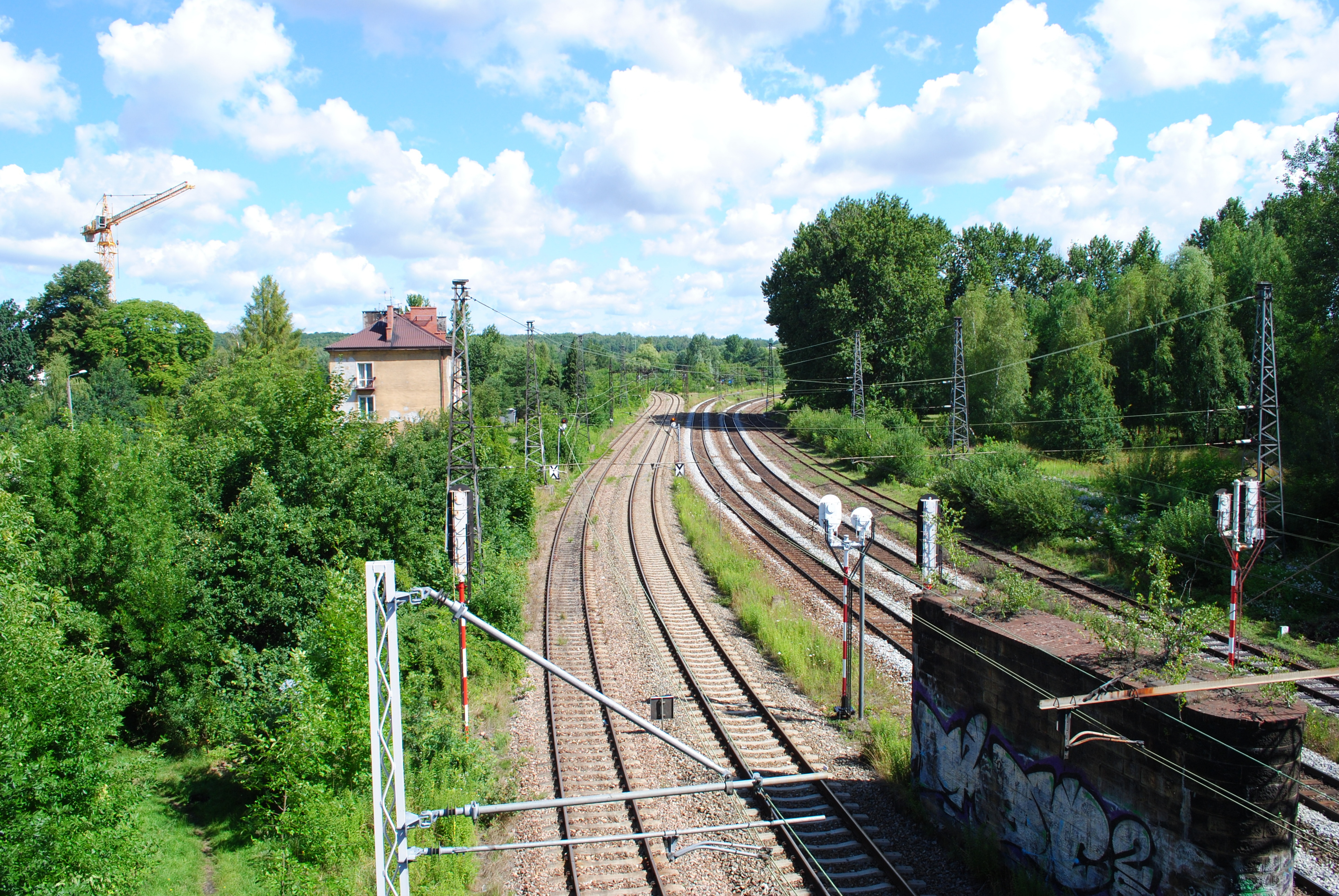
Section of Katowice–Zwardoń (right), Katowice Ligota–Gliwice (left), and Katowice Ligota–KWK Wujek (far right track) railways (view from the viaduct on Piotrowicka and Ligocka streets)

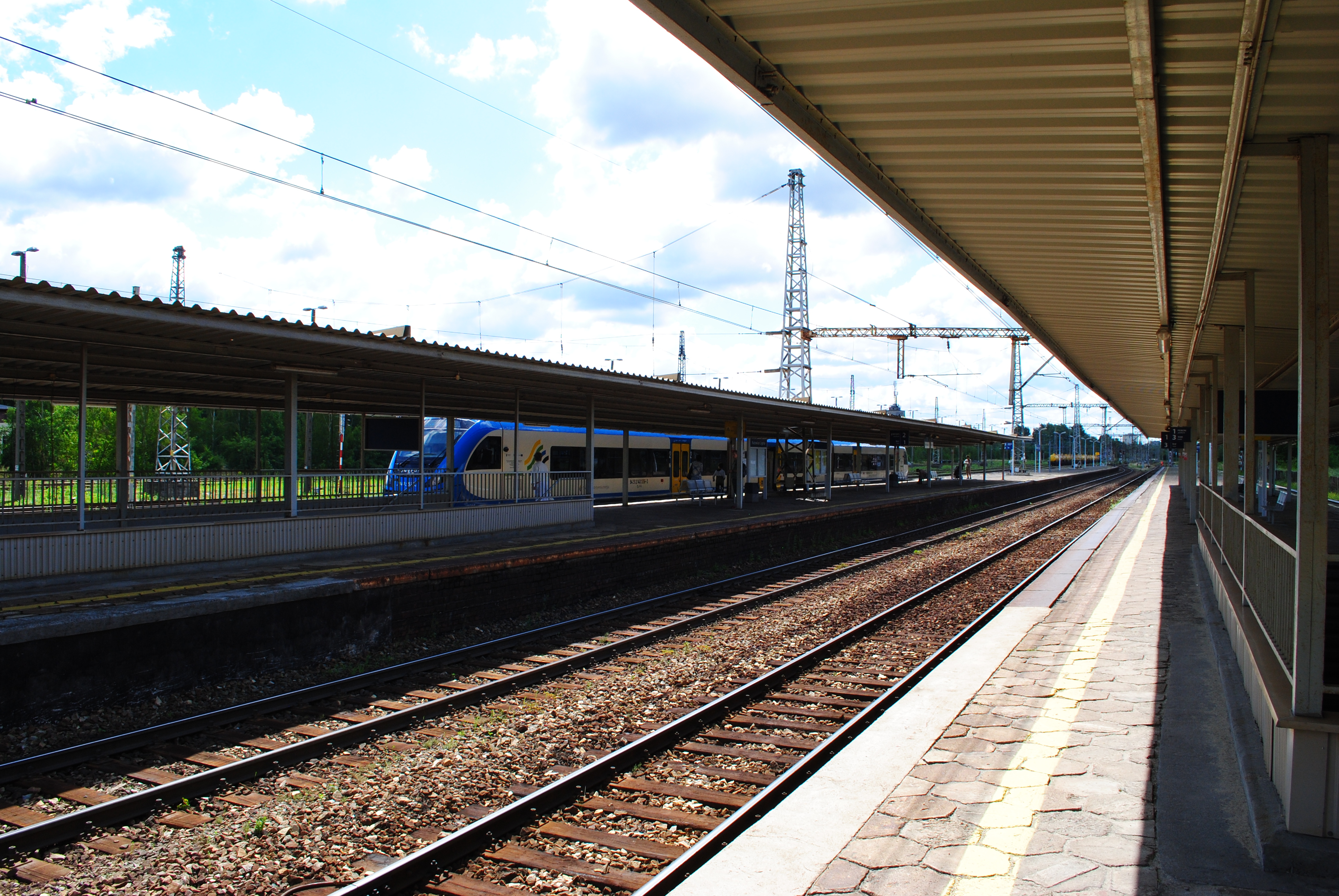
Platforms at Katowice Ligota railway station

As of early 2023, the following standard-gauge railways run or have run through Ligota-Panewniki:

- Katowice–Zwardoń railway – a main railway of national importance, electrified and double-tracked, carrying both passenger and freight traffic. It enters Ligota-Panewniki from the north via Załęska Hałda-Brynów, initially forming the boundary between the two districts. The railway then runs south, crosses Piotrowicka and Ligocka streets via a two-level crossing, and then the Kłodnica, after which it enters the Katowice Ligota railway station area. Further on, it turns southwest and, after crossing Ślepotka, enters Piotrowice-Ochojec;
- Katowice Ligota–Gliwice railway – a first-class railway of national importance, electrified and double-tracked, on which freight traffic operates. It heads north from the Katowice Ligota railway station, then turns west, bypassing Kokociniec from the north, and beyond it crosses the borders of Katowice and Ruda Śląska;
- Katowice Ligota–Tychy railway – a first-class railway of local importance, single-track and electrified, used for freight traffic. It turns southeast from Katowice Ligota railway station, entering Piotrowice-Ochojec;
- Katowice Ligota–KWK Wujek railway – inactive since 2021, a non-electrified, single-track railway used for freight traffic. Within the boundaries of Ligota-Panewniki, it runs parallel to the Katowice–Zwardoń railway;
- Panewnik–KWK Śląsk T2 railway – a freight railway closed before 2015. Within the district, it runs parallel to Katowice Ligota–Gliwice railway;
- Panewnik–KWK Śląsk T1 railway – a freight railway that has been out of service since 2021. Within the district's boundaries, it runs parallel to Katowice Ligota–Gliwice railway.

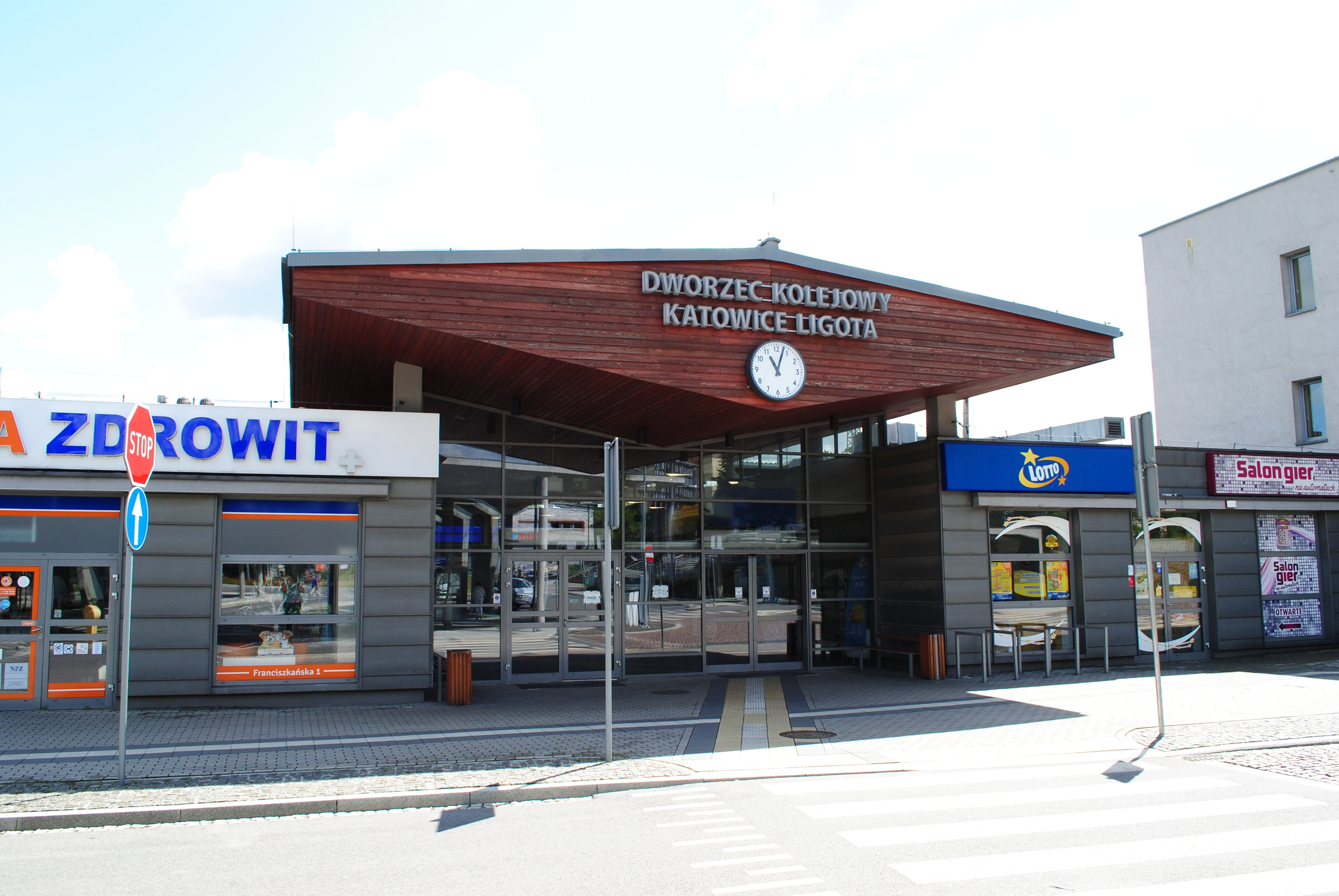
Katowice Ligota railway station (view from the west)

The Katowice Ligota railway station is located in Ligota-Panewniki, between Zielonogórska and Kolejowa streets. It has a station building, traffic lights, additional tracks, and two covered platforms accessible via a subway. The station building is located at the intersection of Panewnicka and Franciszkańska streets, with a Silesian Railways ticket machine. The station is equipped with electronic timetables and surveillance cameras; next to it, there is a parking lot and bicycle racks. According to the schedule valid from 11 December 2022 to 11 March 2023, trains from Silesian Railways and Leo Express stopped at the Katowice Ligota railway station, with destinations such as Chałupki, Częstochowa, Dąbrowa Górnicza Ząbkowice, Katowice, Oświęcim, Praha hlavní nádraží, Racibórz, Tychy Lodowisko, Wisła Głębce, Zakopane (seasonal), Zwardoń, and Żywiec.

The railway network in Ligota-Panewniki developed after 1850, when Upper Silesia was undergoing a process of expanding local rail connections to facilitate the transport of raw materials and products from industrial plants to markets in the west. On 1 December 1852, the railway between Katowice, Ligota, and Murcki was put into service, leading to the Emanuelssegen Coal Mine (Murcki). It was financed by the Upper Silesian Railway and leased to the Racibórz-based Wilhelm's Railway. At the same time, a railway siding from the Upper Silesian Railway to the Ida Iron Works was put into service, and the Idaweiche railway station was established nearby. Over time, the Idaweiche branch station gained the status of a passenger stop. The original single-story station building stood near the site of the former refinery, later the CPN base (now the Orlen base). The siding to the former Ida Iron Works, slightly shortened, survived until the 1990s. It ran along the route of present-day T. Szurman and Książęca streets.

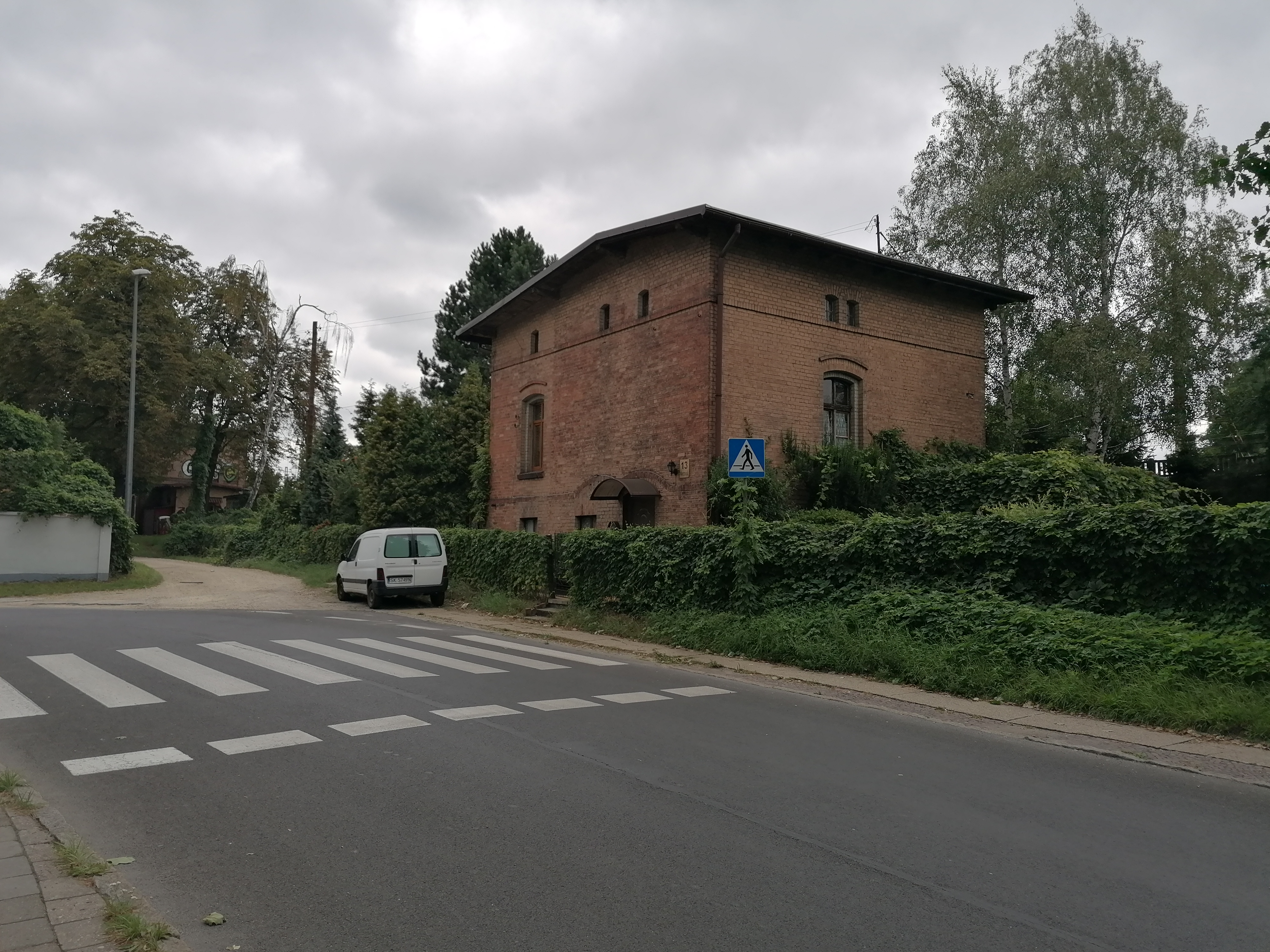
Former waiting room and ticket office of the second Ligota railway station (13 Franciszkańska Street) from 1888

Wilhelm's Railway undertook new railway projects. One of these was the railway from Nędza to Mikołów and further to Ligota. The section between Mikołów and Ligota was opened on 20 December 1858, connecting it to railways of the Upper Silesian Railway. In 1884, the railways in the Kingdom of Prussia were nationalized, and from that point on, all railways within the territory of present-day Katowice became state property. In the spring of 1887, the station's track layout was rebuilt, and a year later, a new railway station building was constructed. The former waiting room and ticket office of the second Ligota railway station is located at 13 Franciszkańska Street. A station building with an apartment on the upper floor was also constructed at 13a Franciszkańska Street.

On 1 October 1904, the Ligota–Bielszowice railway (and further to Gliwice) was opened, and on 2 November 1912, the Ligota–Podlesie–Tychy railway.

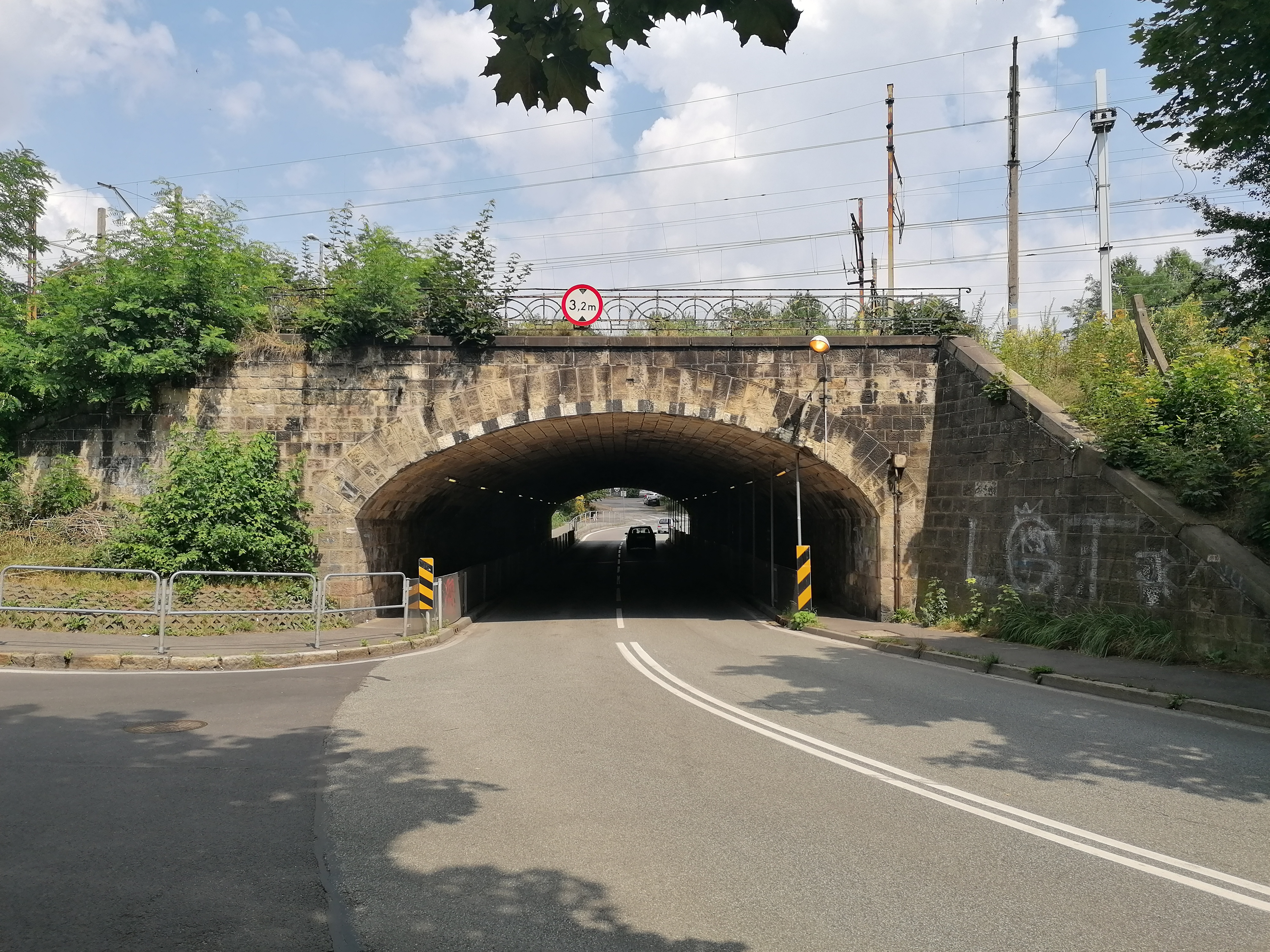
Railway viaduct over Kłodnicka Street, erected during the expansion of Katowice Ligota railway station at the beginning of the 20th century

By 1908 or between 1909 and 1914, a new large railway junction with a classification yard was built south of the existing station, extending to Zadole Street. As part of this project, an engine shed with a turntable, a four-stall hall, and a water tower were built. The track to Murcki was dismantled, and the exit in that direction was relocated to the area of Zadole Street. During the same period, a six-track viaduct was also built over the then-new road from Panewniki to Brynów, along which Kłodnicka Street now runs, as well as a new railway station building (the third of its kind at the time), which was put into service on 5 December 1908 (or built between 1909 and 1914). Its construction was necessitated by the need to handle the increasing pilgrimage traffic to Panewniki and the developing industry in Ligota.

In the interwar years, several new sections were built in Katowice, including the Ligota–Janów railway in 1930. During World War II, the Katowice railway network suffered no major damage. At that time, a second track was built on the Katowice–Ligota–Tychy railway between 1940 and 1943 for military purposes.

During the Polish People's Republic, work began on the electrification of the railway network, including the Ligota-Panewniki area. The Katowice Ligota–Tychy section was opened following electrification on 4 March 1961, while the Katowice Ligota–Mikołów route was opened on 2 December 1977. In the early 1970s, the existing railway station building at Katowice Ligota was demolished, and the new building, replacing the demolished one, was opened on 24 April 1972. It was designed by Karol Fojcik of the Katowice Railway Design Office. New platform shelters were constructed between 1982 and 1985.

The 1980s and 1990s were a time of gradual reduction and suspension of passenger service. On 25 September 1994, passenger service was suspended on the Katowice Ligota–Katowice Murcki–Tychy route, and on 1 June 1997, on the Katowice Ligota–Kochłowice–Gliwice route. Between 2014 and 2015, the station building at Katowice Ligota was renovated and opened on 25 September 2015.

=== Bicycle infrastructure ===
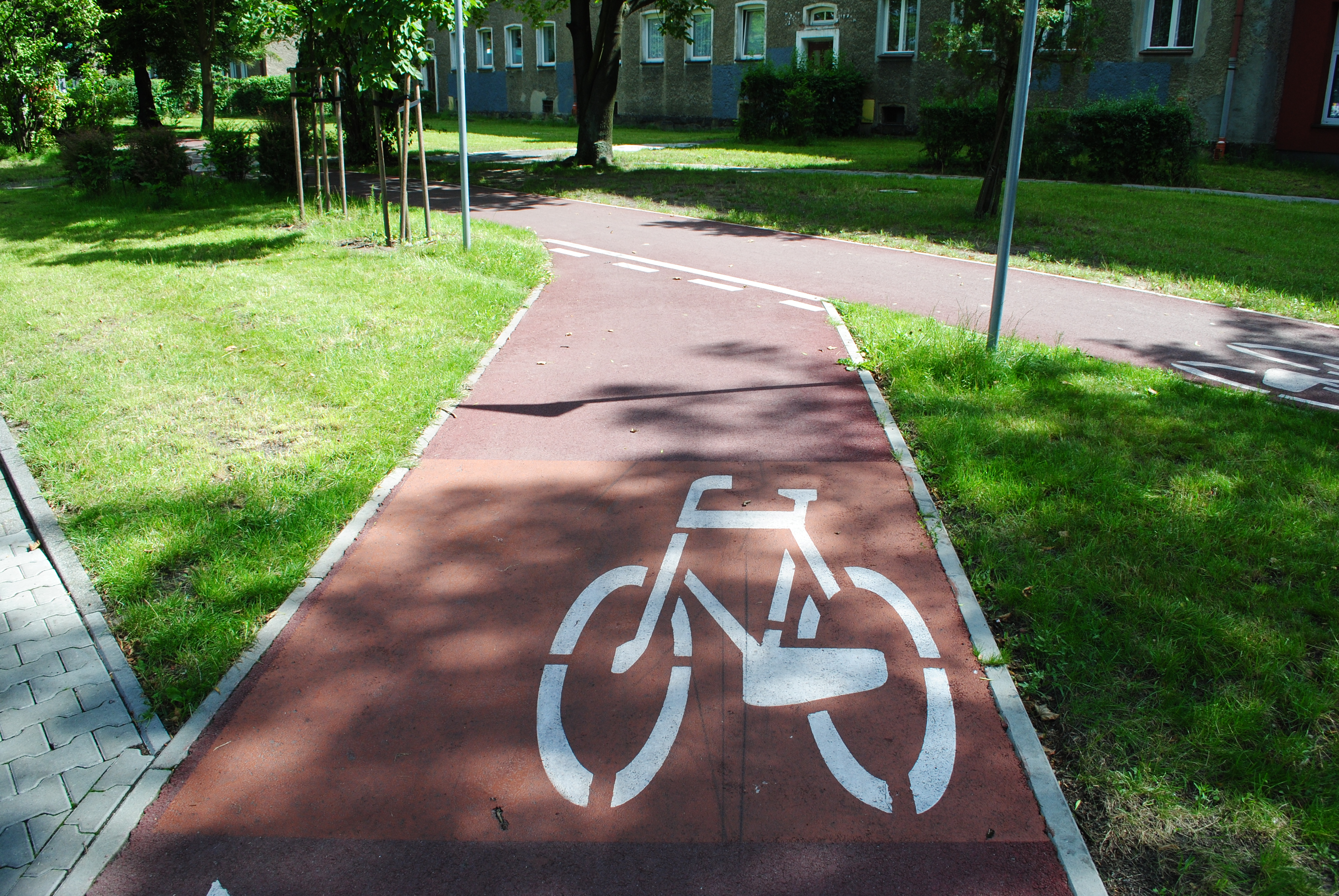
Section of a cycle path with a mineral-asphalt surface in the area of Piotrowicka Street

As of early 2023, the bicycle infrastructure network in Ligota-Panewniki is only partially developed, according to the target bicycle path network published by the City of Katowice – routes still missing by that time include those along Kłodnicka and Poleska streets. The routes serving a transport function have been designated along two corridors: along Kłodnicka/Kolejowa – Panewnicka – Piotrowicka – Poleska – T. Zarański – Medyków – Kijowska – T. Szurman – Piotrowicka streets, and a route encircling Nowe Panewniki from the south, continuing westward along Panewnicka and Gościnna streets.

At the beginning of 2023, the following types of bike paths existed in Ligota-Panewniki:

- Bicycle paths – along Panewnicka Street (between Świdnicka and Koszalińska streets, and between Partyzantów and Owsiana streets), Piotrowicka Street (between B. Szabelski Square and Słupska Street), and Medyków Street (between Panewnicka and T. Zarański streets);
- Bicycle lanes – along Medyków Street on the section between T. Zarański and Śląska streets;
- Separated pedestrian and bicycle paths – along Kolejowa, T. Szurman, Ostrawska, Owsiana (to building no. 60), Kijowska (to building no. 7), Panewnicka (in the area of the Ligota Transit Center) and Koszalińska (route near the Scout Defenders of Katowice High School) streets;
- Unseparated pedestrian and bicycle routes – along Panewnicka Street (northern side of the road between Grunwaldzka and Piotrowicka streets);
- Paths with permitted traffic on the sidewalk – paths in Zadole Park;
- Contraflow lanes – along Zielonogórska Street.

As part of the "Cycling Through Silesia" project, bicycle routes have been designated within the city; in the Ligota-Panewniki district, the following routes intersect:

- No. 2 Kościuszko Park – Załęska Hałda-Brynów – Ligota-Panewniki (streets: St. Hadyna, Kijowska, Medyków, Śląska and Wczasowa – Zadole Park – Studencka and Śląska streets – Panewniki Forests – Owsiana Street – Katowice/Mikołów city boundary);
- No. 3 Giszowiec – Piotrowice-Ochojec – Ligota-Panewniki (Studencka Street – Panewniki Forests – Owsiana and Kuźnicka streets – forest in Stare Panewniki);
- No. 103 Silesian Park – Osiedle Tysiąclecia – Załęże – Osiedle Witosa – Załęska Hałda-Brynów – Ligota-Panewniki (Ogrodowa Street – city of Katowice boundary);
- No. 122 Ligota-Panewniki (streets: Medyków, Ludowa, Krucza and Ogrodowa) – Załęska Hałda-Brynów.

Part of the city's bike-sharing network – Metrorower – operates in Ligota-Panewniki, having replaced the City by bike system. It was the largest system of its kind in Metropolis GZM and was operated by Nextbike. At the beginning of 2023, there were 10 City by bike stations in the district: Os. Franciszkańskie (Książęca Street), Kokociniec S.P. nr 67 (Zielona Street), Ligota – Centrum Przesiadkowe (Panewnicka Street), Skwer Bolesława Szabelskiego (Piotrowicka Street), Ligota Medyków (Medyków Street), Panewnicka Szkoła Podstawowa nr 9 (Zamiejska Street), Rondo Huchrackiego (Panewnicka Street), Galeria Libero (Kolejowa Street), Zadole Kościół (Gdańska Street), and Śląska – Medyków (Studencka Street).

=== Public transport ===
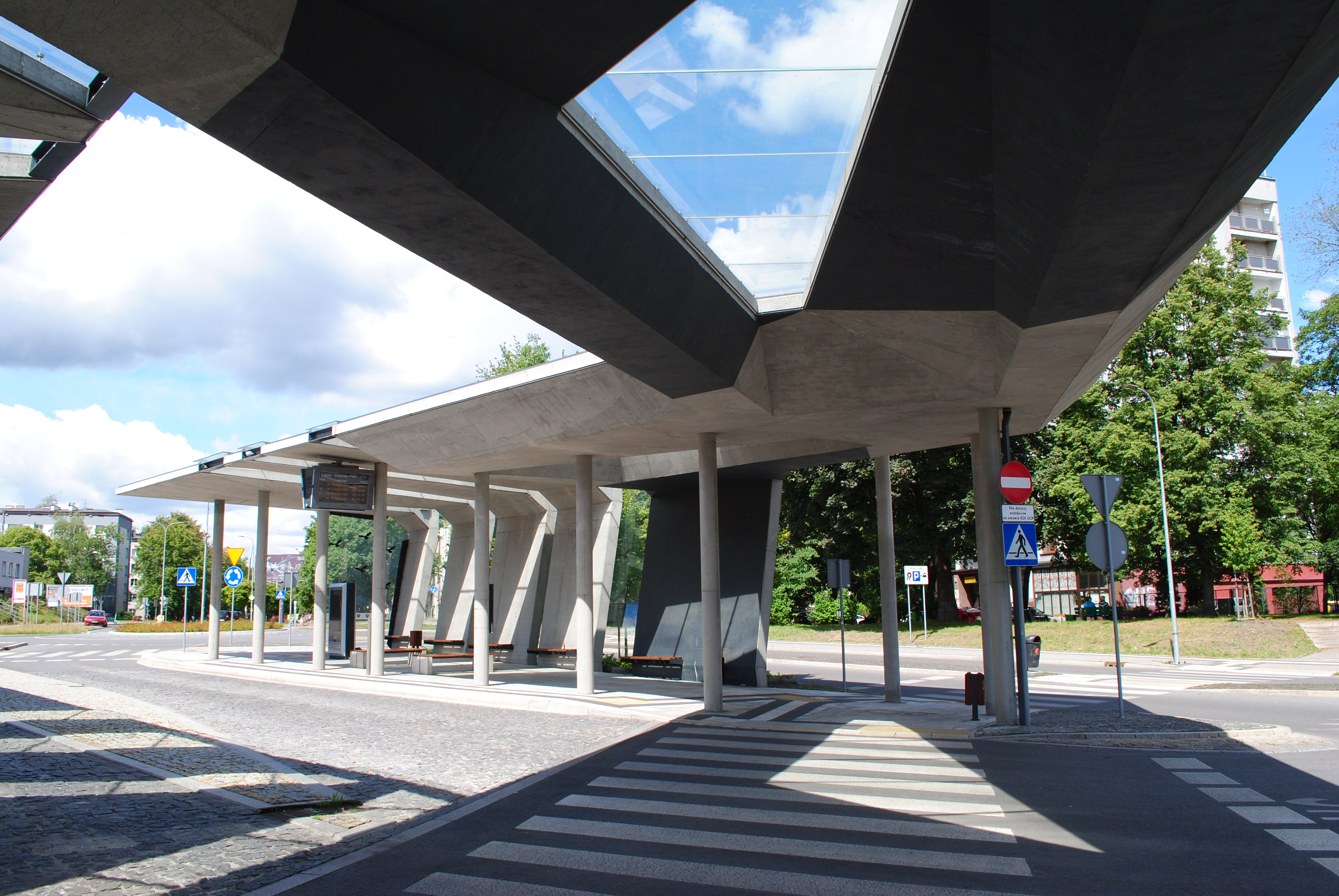
Part of the Ligota Transit Center, opened in 2018

Public transportation within Ligota-Panewniki is provided exclusively by bus routes organized by the Metropolitan Transport Authority, while the main operator of the lines running through the district is Katowice Municipal Transport Company. Bus stops are located at important points throughout the district, and the routes with the highest number of public transport buses in 2008 included the following streets: Piotrowicka, Panewnicka, Kijowska, J. Wybicki, Krucza, Panewnicka, Piotrowicka towards Piotrowice-Ochojec, Panewnicka, Kłodnicka, and Śląska. The travel time by bus during rush hour from Ligota to the city center is approximately 26 minutes, and from Stare Panewniki about an hour.

At the beginning of 2023, 15 bus routes (including 2 night routes) departed from the Ligota Poleska stop, 11 routes (including 2 night routes) from the Ligota Medyków stop, 5 routes (including 2 night routes) from the Kokociniec Kijowska stop, and 4 routes (including 2 night routes). These buses provide connections both to other parts of Katowice and to other cities in Metropolis GZM, including Chorzów, Ruda Śląska, and Gliwice.

Across from the Katowice Ligota railway station, at the intersection of Panewnicka and Franciszkańska streets, is the Ligota Transit Center. It has bus stands, bicycle parking, a parking lot for 110 cars, taxi stands, a bike-sharing station, and a park and ride point. The first buses from the transit center began operating on 5 November 2018, and at the time of its opening, four bus lines stopped there: the existing lines 13 and 51, and two new ones – 912 and 913. The construction of the transit center cost approximately 9.1 million złoty.

== Architecture and urban planning ==
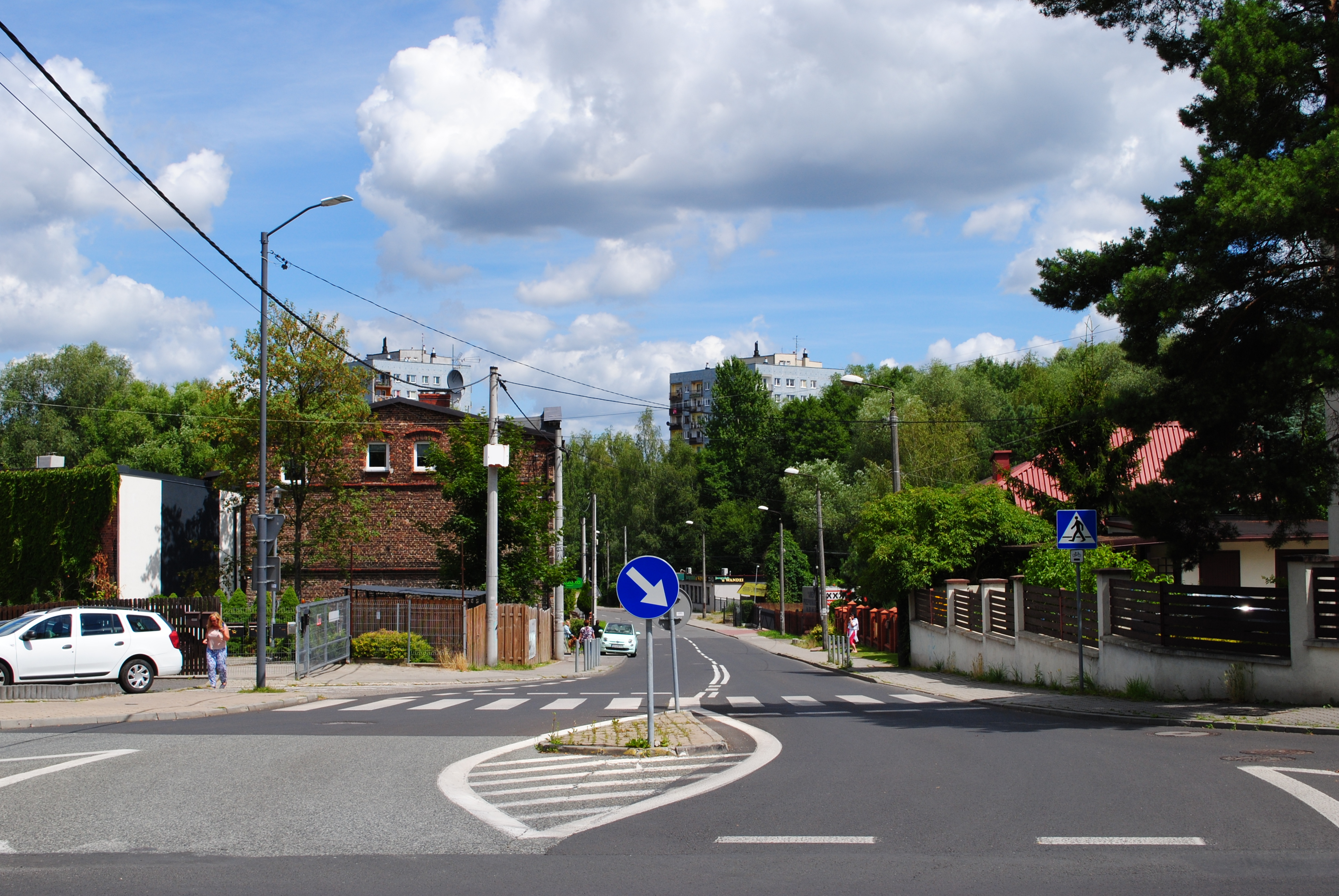
Beginning of Krucza Street in Kokociniec with a view of buildings from various historical periods

The buildings in Ligota-Panewniki are diverse in terms of both architectural style and the period in which they were built. Single-family homes predominate west of Piotrowicka Street, as well as along Panewnicka Street, which is also the site of a concentration of new single-family and row houses. Medium- and high-rise multi-family housing is located in Kokociniec, Zadole, Wymysłów, and the central part of Ligota (Nowa Ligota). High-rise residential buildings (9–11 stories) in the district are concentrated in Kokociniec, Zadole, and along Koszalińska and Świdnicka streets in Ligota.

Originally, Ligota's settlement developed near present-day Stara Ligota in the Katowice district of Załęska Hałda-Brynów (the area of today's Ligocka, Załęska, Hetmańska, and Rolna streets), while Panewniki by the Kłodnica river at the mouth of the Ślepotka (later Stare Panewniki).

In the 18th century, the area of present-day Katowice was dominated by wooden structures in the form of log cottages and farm buildings. The map of Christian Friedrich von Wrede from 1749 shows the outline of today's Panewnicka Street. At that time, Ligota's buildings were concentrated near Stara Ligota, and the present-day intersection of Piotrowicka and Panewnicka streets was covered by forest. Near the crossroads to Kokociniec and Panewniki, there were several peasant farmsteads, and in Wymysłów, the farms were concentrated closer to the confluence of the Ślepiotka and Kłodnica rivers. The settlement of Panewniki at that time stretched from the current intersection of Panewnicka and Owsiana streets to the intersection of Panewnicka and Kuźnicka streets (the area of present-day Stare Panewniki). At that time, dense settlement was concentrated in Panewniki, Wymysłów, and Kokociniec, while Ligota had scattered buildings.

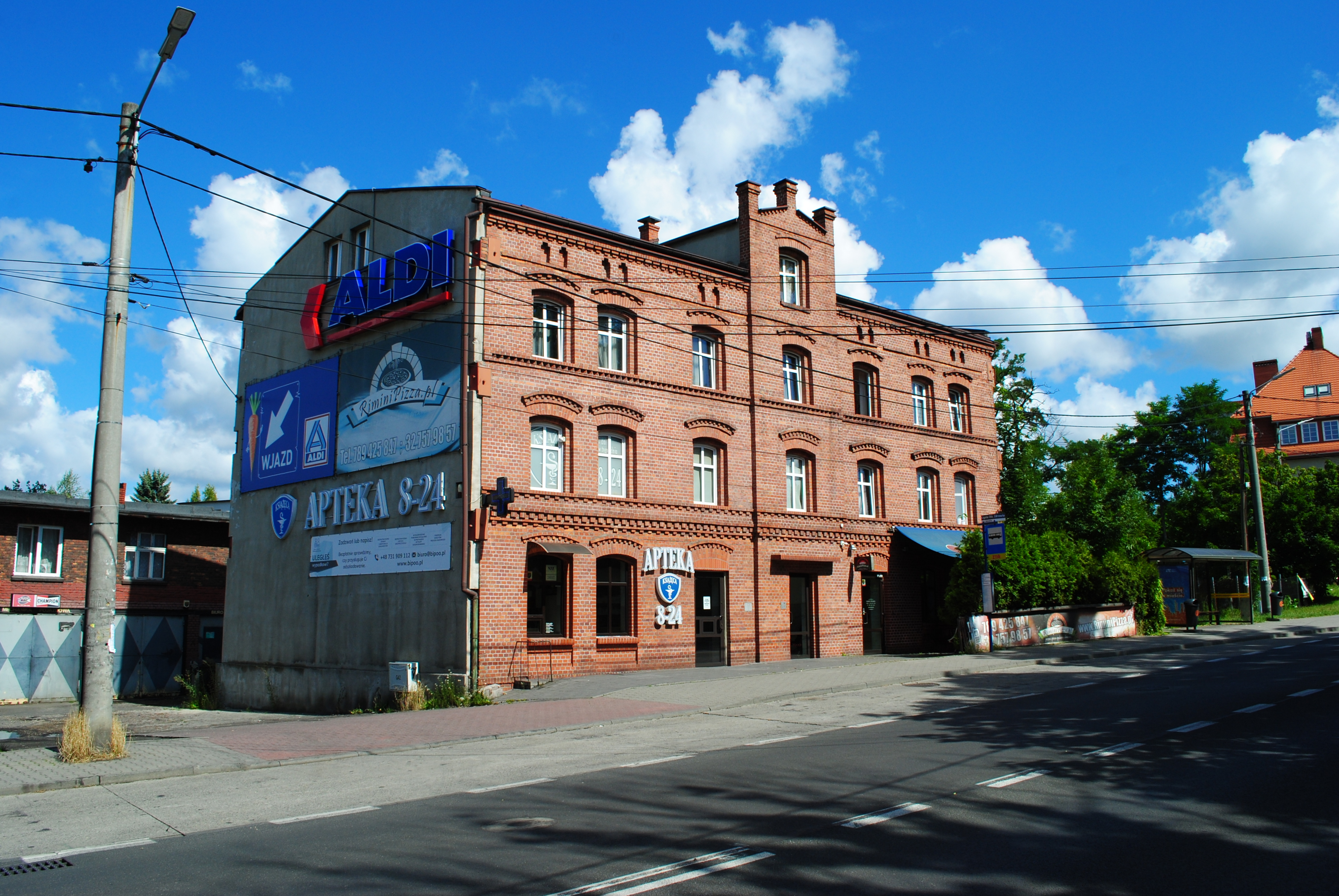
Tenement at 79 Piotrowicka Street from the turn of the 19th and 20th centuries

Maps published up to the first half of the 19th century show a gradual increase in building density in Kokociniec, Wymysłów, and Panewniki, and the further development of Ligota-Panewniki in the 19th century is linked to the industrialization of these lands. The general map of the Duchy of Pless from between 1863 and 1867 indicates that new development in Ligota had already reached the area of the present-day Ligota-Panewniki district, on the other side of the Kłodnica, after which it heads south, although at that time the intersection of Panewnicka and Piotrowicka streets and the section of Panewnicka Street up to the intersection with Kijowska Street were still undeveloped. This was also a time when wooden buildings were being replaced by brick ones, which intensified mainly from the mid-19th century onward after the implementation of an administrative ban on wooden construction to improve fire safety. The buildings there were mostly constructed of brick.

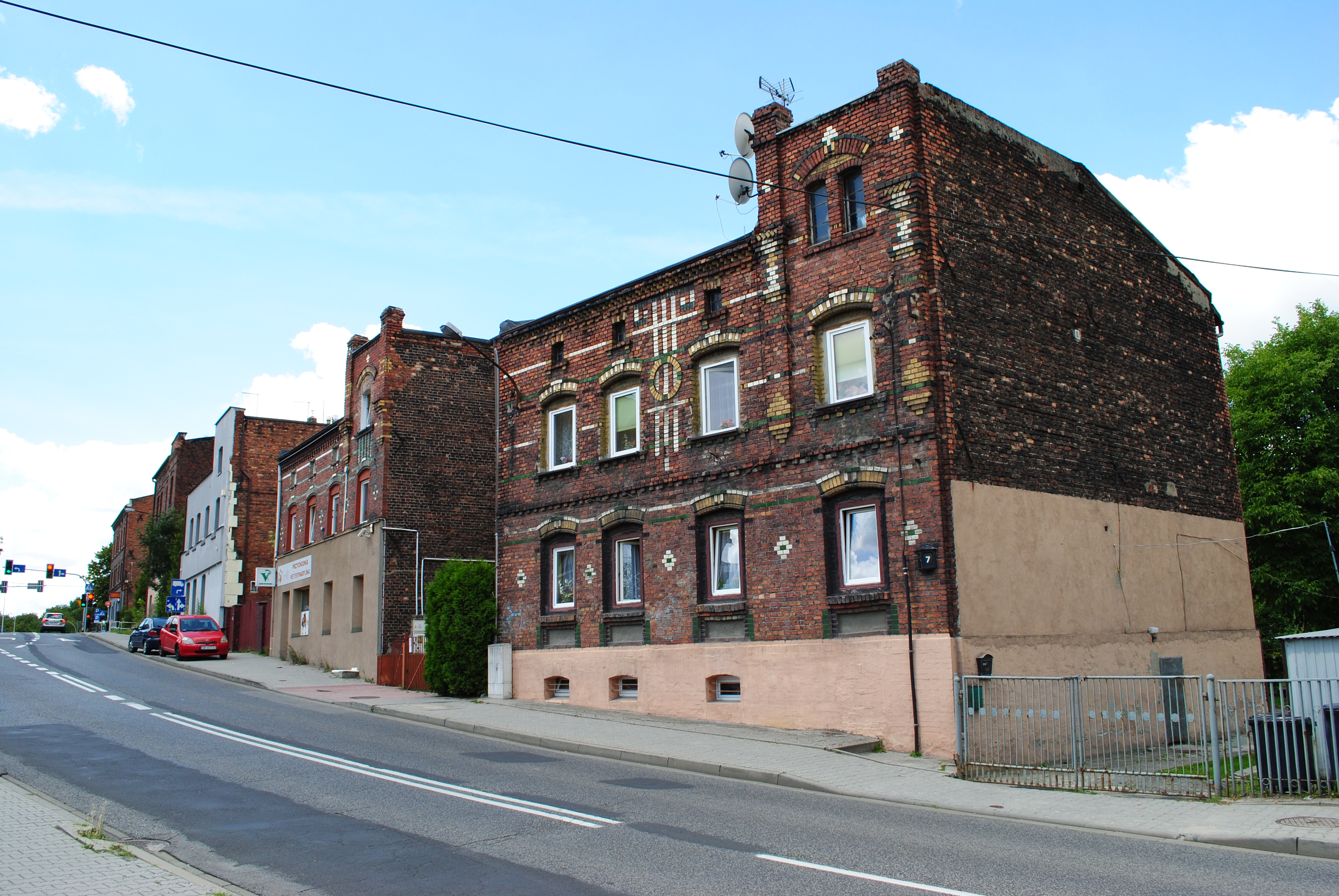
Group of four traditional houses – 1, 3, 5, and 7 Kijowska Street from the early 20th century

Some 19th-century rural cottages have been preserved in Stare Panewniki along Panewnicka Street. Fragments of Upper Silesian wooden architecture from the original settlement of Kokociniec have survived near Braci Wieczorków, Płocha, and Stolarska streets. One of these houses, the Mrowiec family's cottage, is located at 17 Braci Wieczorków Street, likely dating from the first half of the 19th century. It consists of a wooden living area and a brick barn. In the corners of the residential part, the beams are joined using the so-called dovetail joint. The cottage has a gable roof with rafter framing, and is covered with roofing felt. Inside, there is a square entrance hall, a kitchen, a pantry, and a room with a small chamber.

Around 1842, a workers' colony was established near the Ida Iron Works, in the vicinity of Kijowska Street; it originally consisted of six buildings.

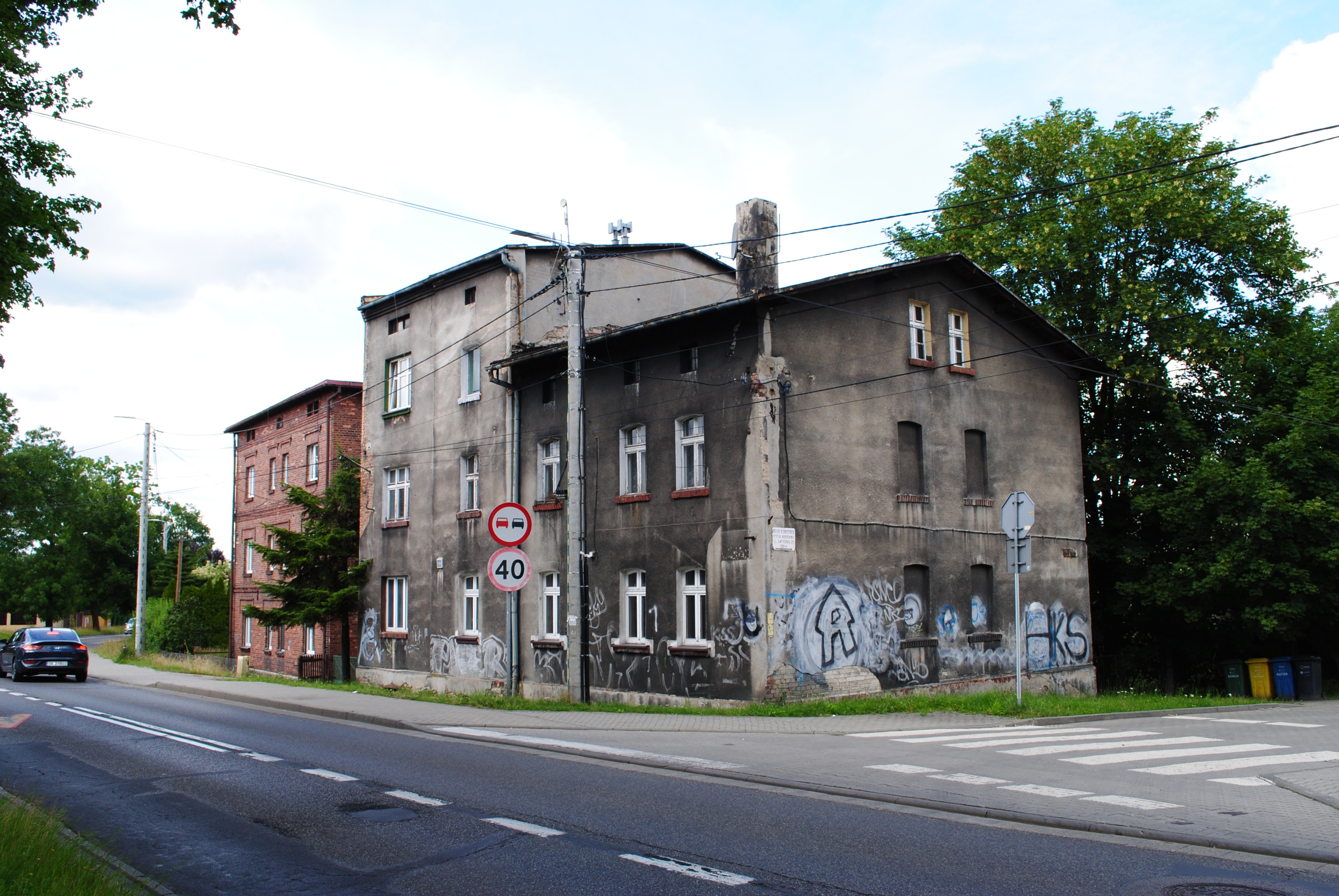
Buildings at 180 and 182 Panewnicka Street from the early 20th century

Between 1865 and 1922, the construction of the railway and the accompanying station had a significant impact on the district's urban layout. Dense development began to form around this station in Ligota, while in Panewniki, the Renaissance Revival Franciscan monastery complex was built between 1905 and 1907, designed by Mansuetus Fromm. Since the establishment of the Franciscan monastery at the beginning of the 20th century, the buildings in Ligota and Panewniki slowly began to converge, and the boundary between the two historic gminas began to blur (it was no longer visible in the building line). On a map from 1914, the current Panewnicka Street was already fully developed between the present-day Kijowska and Krucza streets, as well as around the monastery.

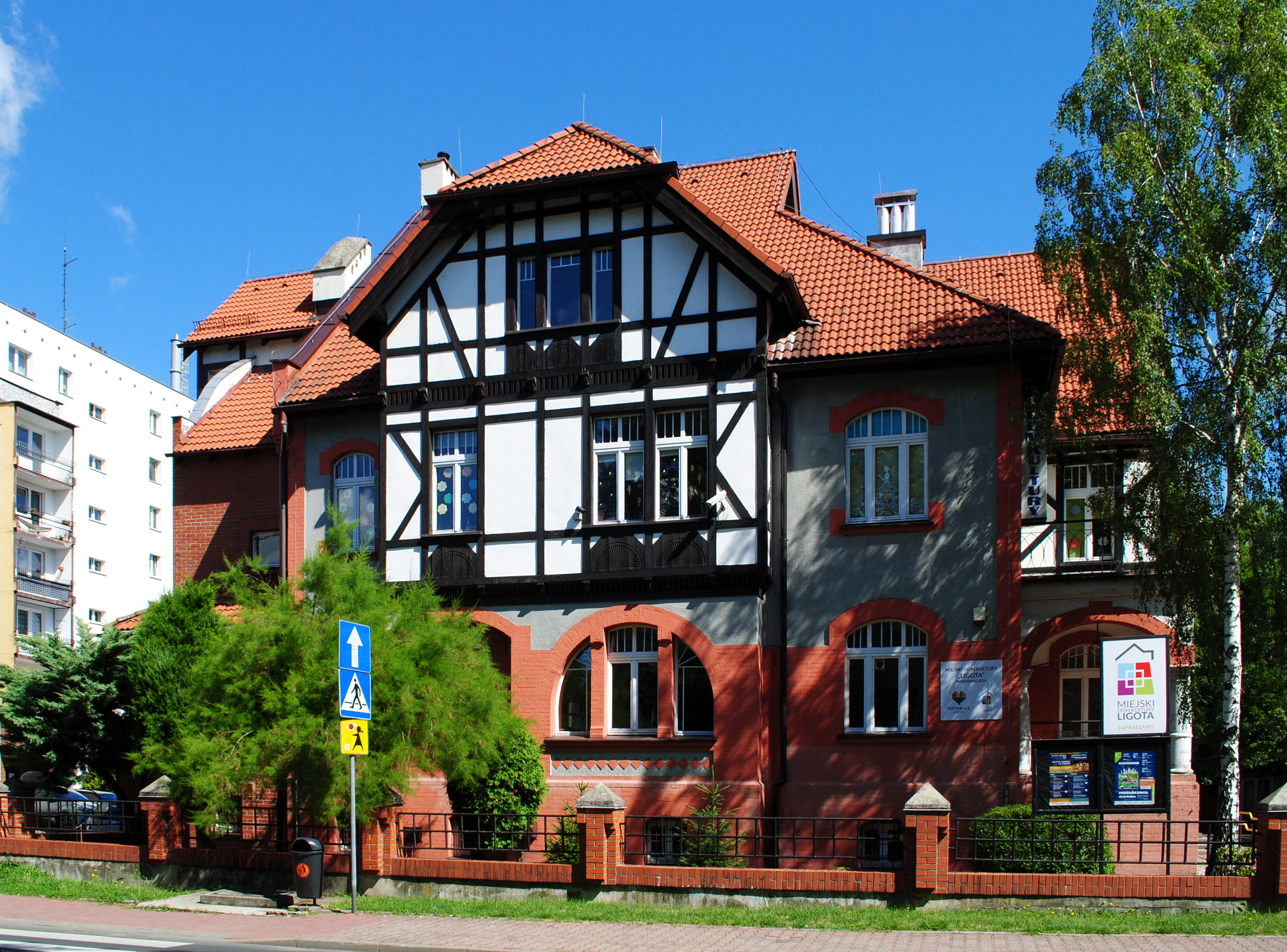
Villa of the Director of the Ligota Chemical Factory from 1910 – currently the seat of Ligota Municipal Cultural Center

In 1910, a building for the director of the Ligota Chemical Factory was completed at 33 Franciszkańska Street – today it serves as the headquarters of the Ligota Municipal Cultural Center. A modern school was opened in 1913 at 172 Panewnicka Street. It was renovated in 1933, and a new wing was added in 1937.

In the interwar years, Brynów and Ligota were districts of Katowice that were partly agricultural in character, with recreational areas and plots of land designated in part for single-family housing. New development in Ligota arose to the east and south of the Panewniki monastery, while in Panewniki near Owsiana Street, and in Wymysłów, there was a slight expansion of rural development during this period. Kokociniec also expanded northward and southward. In the area of Medyków Street, near the monastery, a new center of Panewniki (known as Nowe Panewniki) was established.

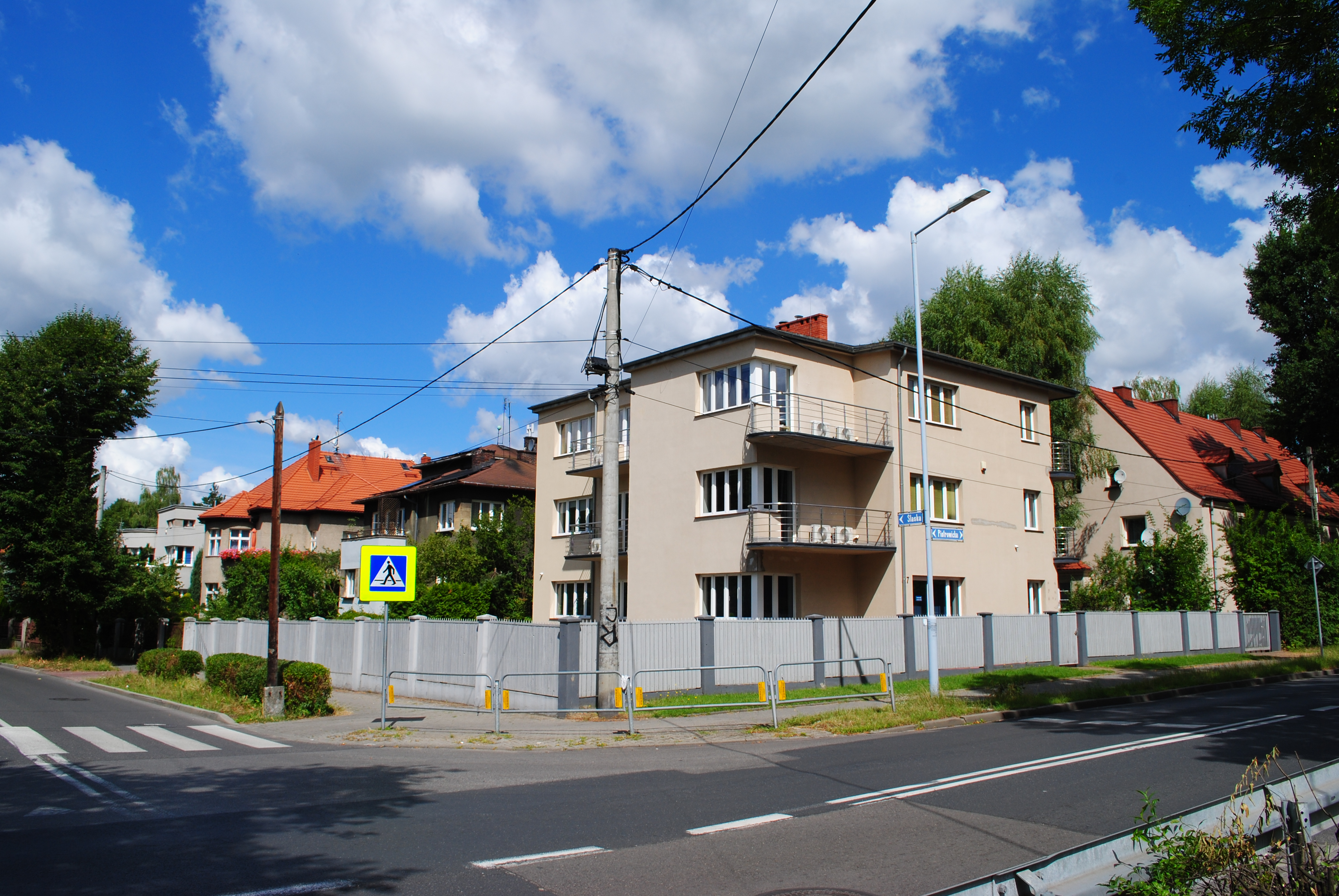
Part of the civil servants' single-family house colony (Śląska Street)

A new urban development – a colony of single-family homes for civil servants – was established in Ligota during the interwar period. The Voivodeship Office purchased the land for this purpose from the management of the Pszczyna duke's mine in 1929. The office later oversaw the parceling and construction efforts. The colony, built from 1936, was conceived as a model residential district using modern architectural and urban planning concepts. Its plan is based on the idea of a "garden city", with a grid-like street layout. Another distinctive element is the naming of the streets, which refers to the names of Polish regions at the time, including Silesia, Lesser Poland, Pomerania, Vilnius, Polesia, and Lesser Poland. Several buildings within the civil servants' housing complex in Ligota are: the villa of Antoni Pająk (16 Poleska Street; built from 1936 to 1937), the villa of Dr. Władysław Kowal (16 Mazowiecka Street; from 1937; designed by Kazimierz Sołtykowski), the villa of Dr. Bolesław Mroczkowski (1 Mazowiecka Street; from 1937; designed by Lucjan Sikorski), and the villa at 11 Mazowiecka Street (from between 1936 and 1938, with characteristic rounded elements). Later development in Nowa Ligota during the German occupation and the Polish People’s Republic disrupted the original urban design concept of the housing estate.

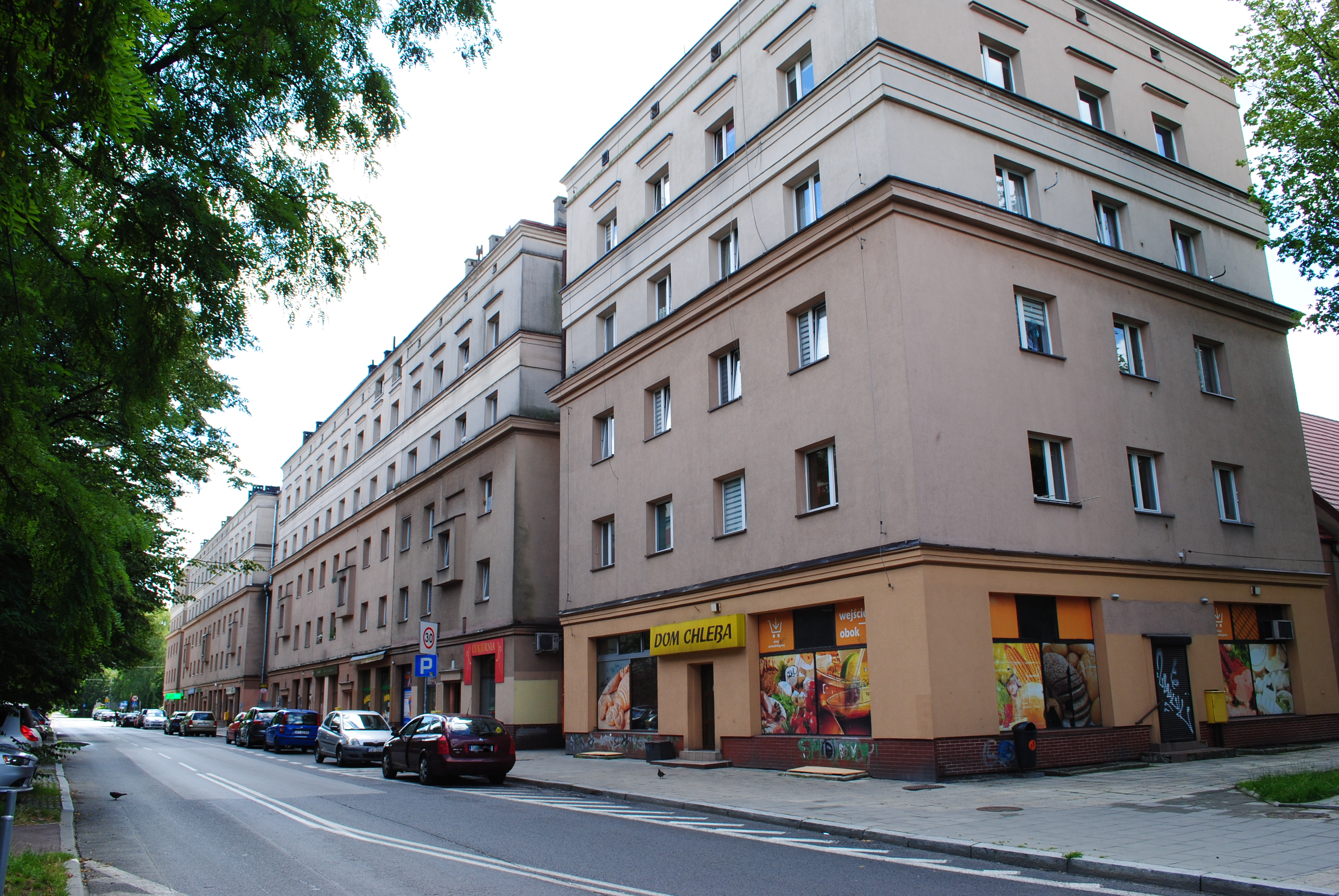
Part of socialist realist buildings in Nowa Ligota from the 1950s (Słupska Street)

On the north side of Panewnicka Street, in the area of Emerytalna and Zagrody streets, a housing estate for railway workers was built between 1926 and 1927. It was financed by the Regional Directorate of the State Railways. In 1937, it was taken over by the city. In Zadole, new houses were built along Zadole Street in the 1930s, and in Ligota, an International Style school was constructed at 13 Panewnicka Street between 1936 and 1938.

During World War II, the expansion of Ligota-Panewniki was disrupted, and only a few typical single-story multi-family houses were built in the area of Piotrowicka, Mazowiecka, and Bronisława streets, which the locals referred to as "German barns" or "barns".

The years between 1945 and 1989 were a time of urban assimilation for Zadole, Ligota, Panewniki, and Kokociniec. Stare Panewniki expanded eastward, and a church was built there. In Wymysłów and Kokociniec, new housing estates were created between the old farms. In Ligota, further expansion took place between the railroad line and the civil servants' housing estate. During this period, a complex of hospitals and university dormitories was also built.

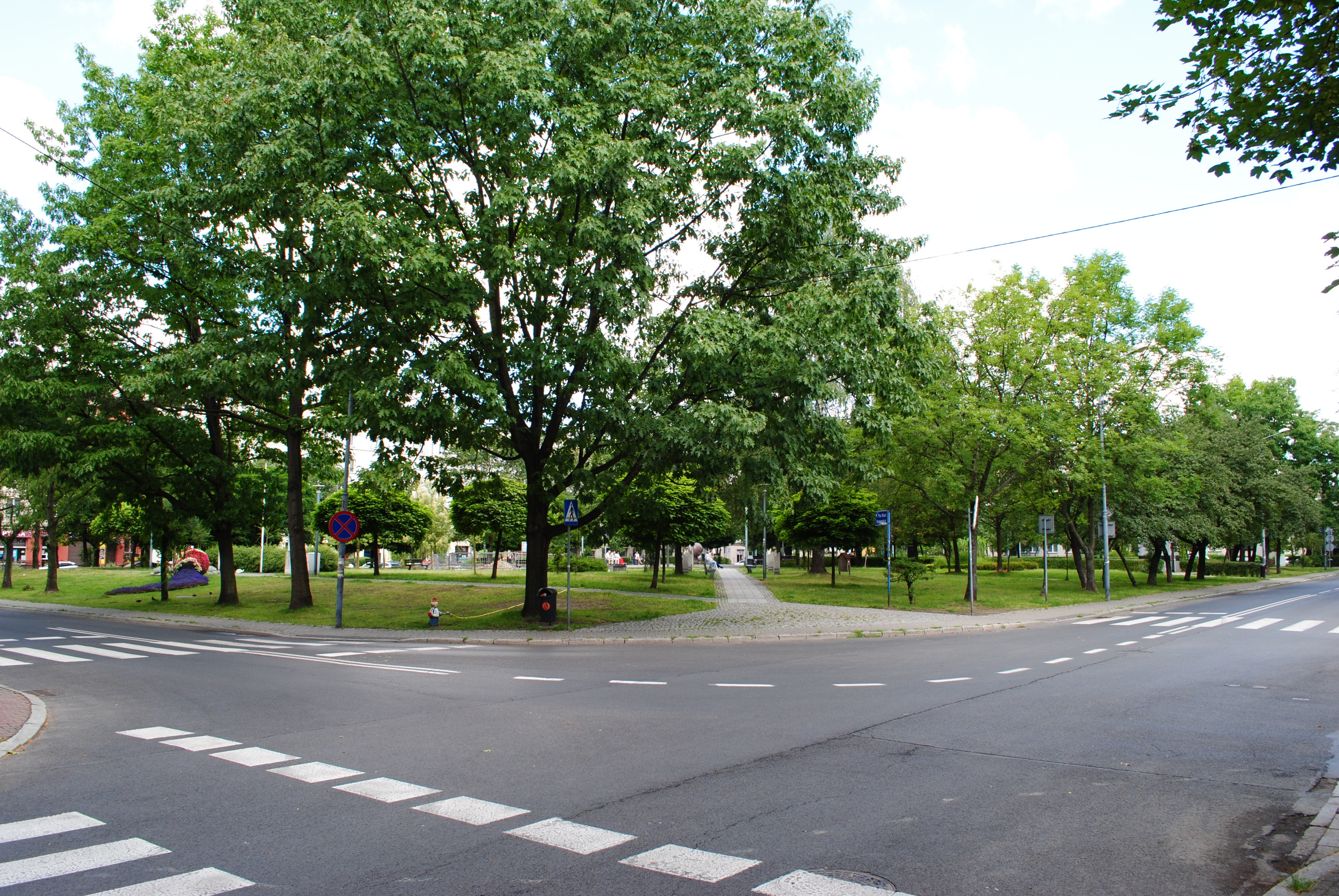
Part of Sister Cities Square

In the 1950s, socialist realist apartment buildings were constructed south of Panewnicka Street, in the section between the railroad tracks and the intersection with Piotrowicka Street (in the area of Panewnicka, Piotrowicka, Kołobrzeska, and Zielonogórska streets). In the first phase, four-story apartment buildings were built around rectangular internal courtyards; in the second phase, the first experimental large-panel-system buildings were constructed; and in the third phase, residential high-rises were built. It is a housing estate with an internal green space, and its central point is Sister Cities Square. The square initially served as an estate park; today it is commonly referred to as Ligota's central square. The Katowice City Council bestowed its current name on 31 May 2010.

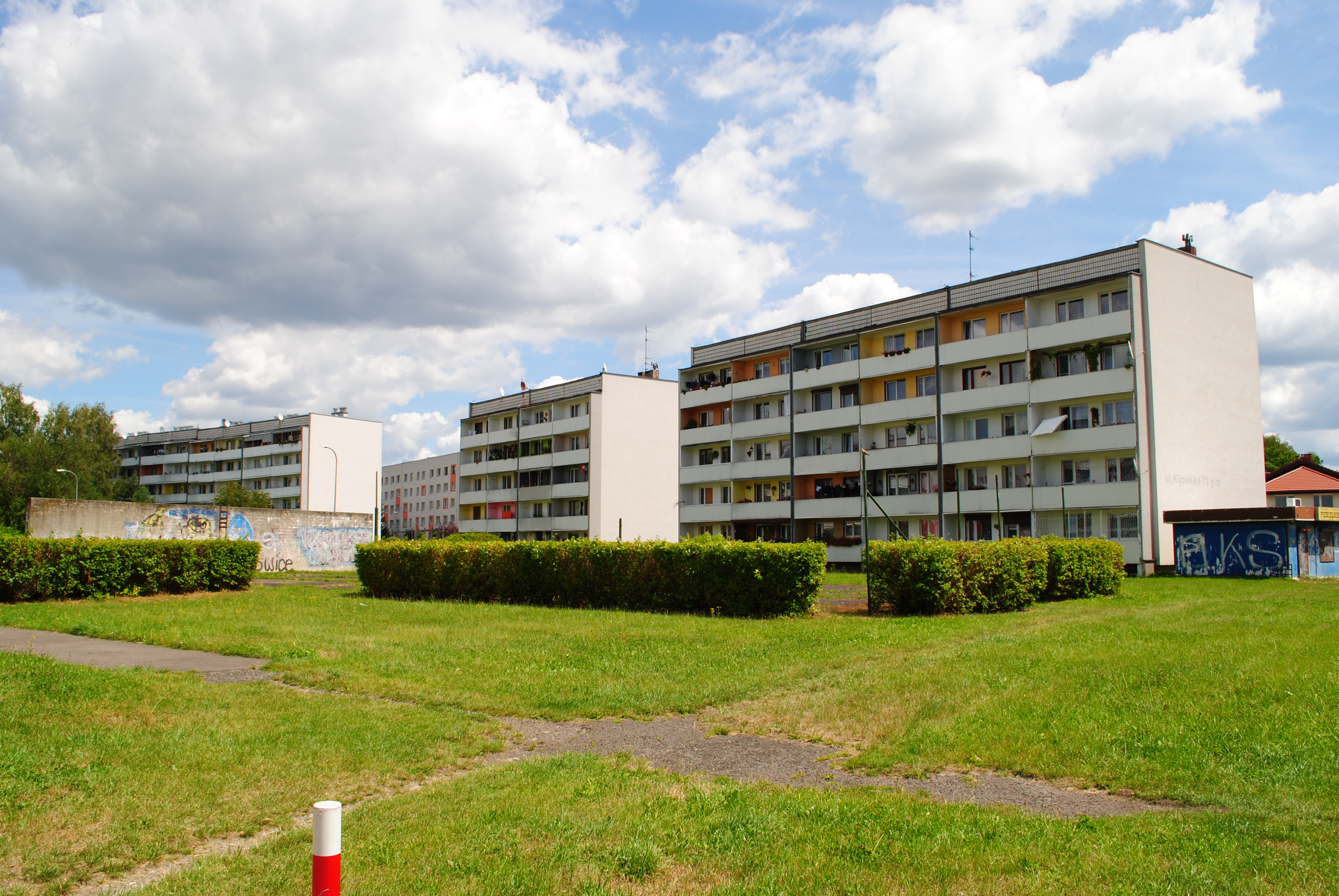
Part of the housing estate in Kokociniec from the 1970s (Kijowska Street)

In the late 1960s, Osiedle Akademickie of the University of Silesia was built in Zadole on Studencka Street, consisting of three dormitories. in the early 1970s, a row of single-family homes, the so-called "railway housing estate", was built there along Bieszczadzka Street. In 1976, construction began on a housing estate of eleven-story apartment blocks for 4,000 people in the area of Zadole and Gdańska streets and along the Ślepiotka. The Górnik Housing Cooperative's housing estate was designed by architect Henryk Trzcionkowski from Katowice's "Miastoprojekt".

In the 1970s, a housing estate for employees of the Śląsk Coal Mine was built in Kokociniec in the area of Krucza, Zielona, Kijowska, and J. Wybicki streets, and between 1980 and 1982, multi-story apartment buildings along the Kłodnica – seven 10-story high-rises.

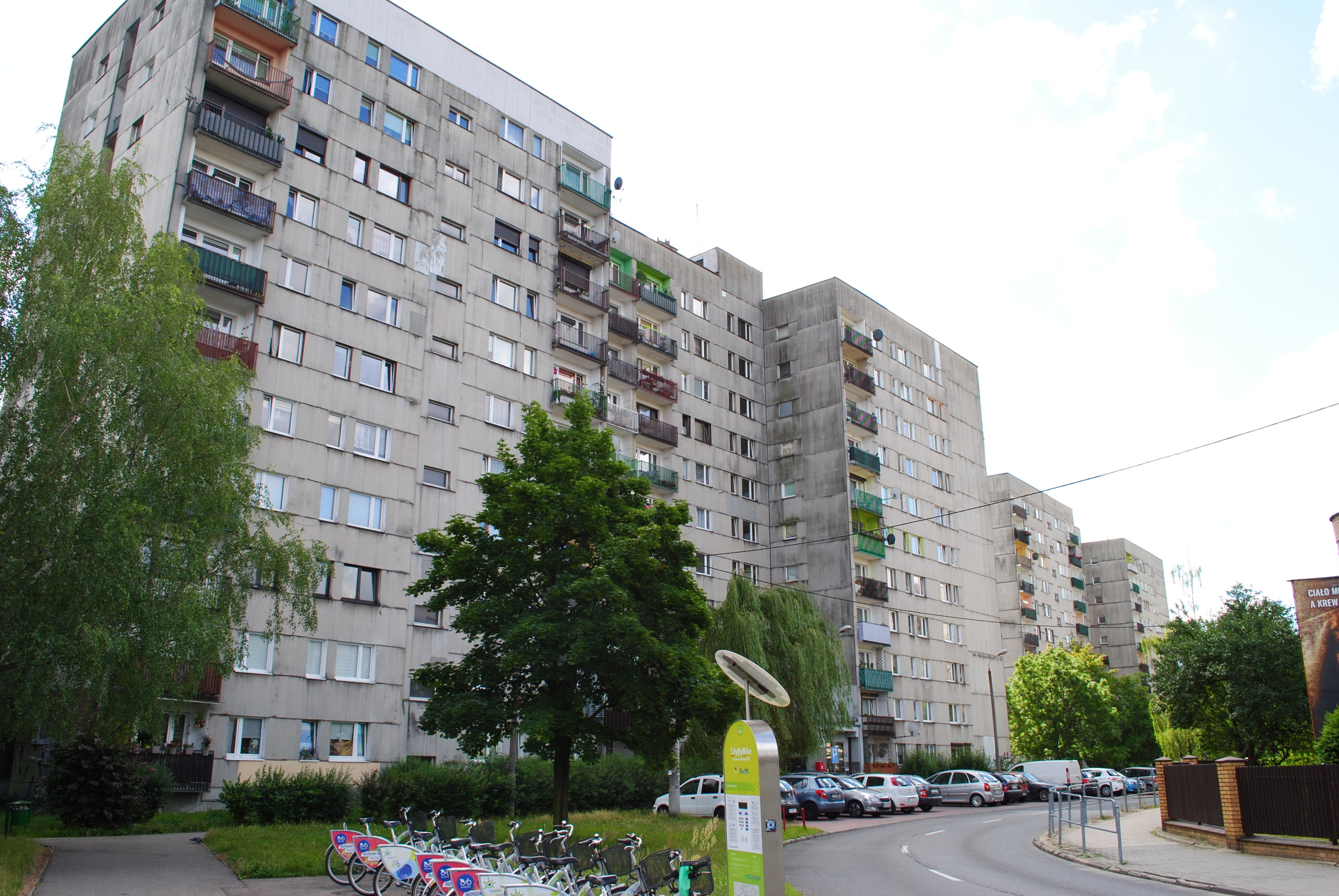
Part of the housing estate in Zadole (Zadole Street)

In Wymysłów, the Katowice Housing Cooperative built a housing estate of three-story apartment buildings near Panewnicka, Bałtycka, and Partyzantów streets between 1977 and 1979; between 1979 and 1983, the Silesia Housing Cooperative built two complexes of single-family homes in a dense layout in the area of Bałtycka Street, and between 1981 and 1984, the Górnik Housing Cooperative built a housing estate of large-panel-system buildings – three- and four-story.

In the late 1980s and early 1990s, the Sadyba housing estate was built in Kokociniec, in the area around Krucza and Szafirowa streets. It was developed by the Sadyba Housing Cooperative and consists of over a dozen three- and four-story apartment buildings designed by the architectural firm AIR under the direction of Ryszard Jurkowski. Between 1985 and 1992, the Church of Our Lady of the Rosary was built in Zadole according to a design by Michał Kuczmiński.

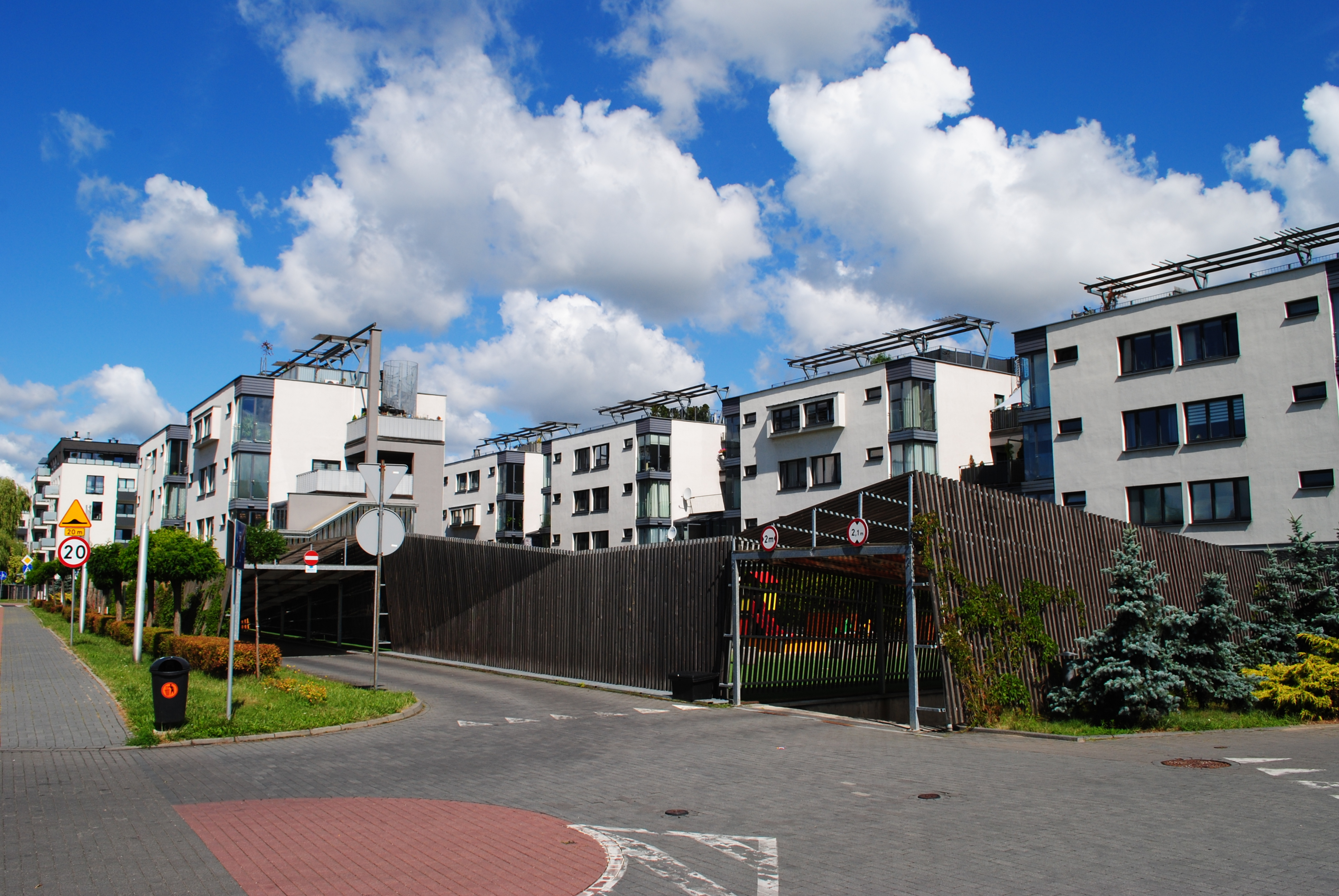
Part of Osiedle Książęce

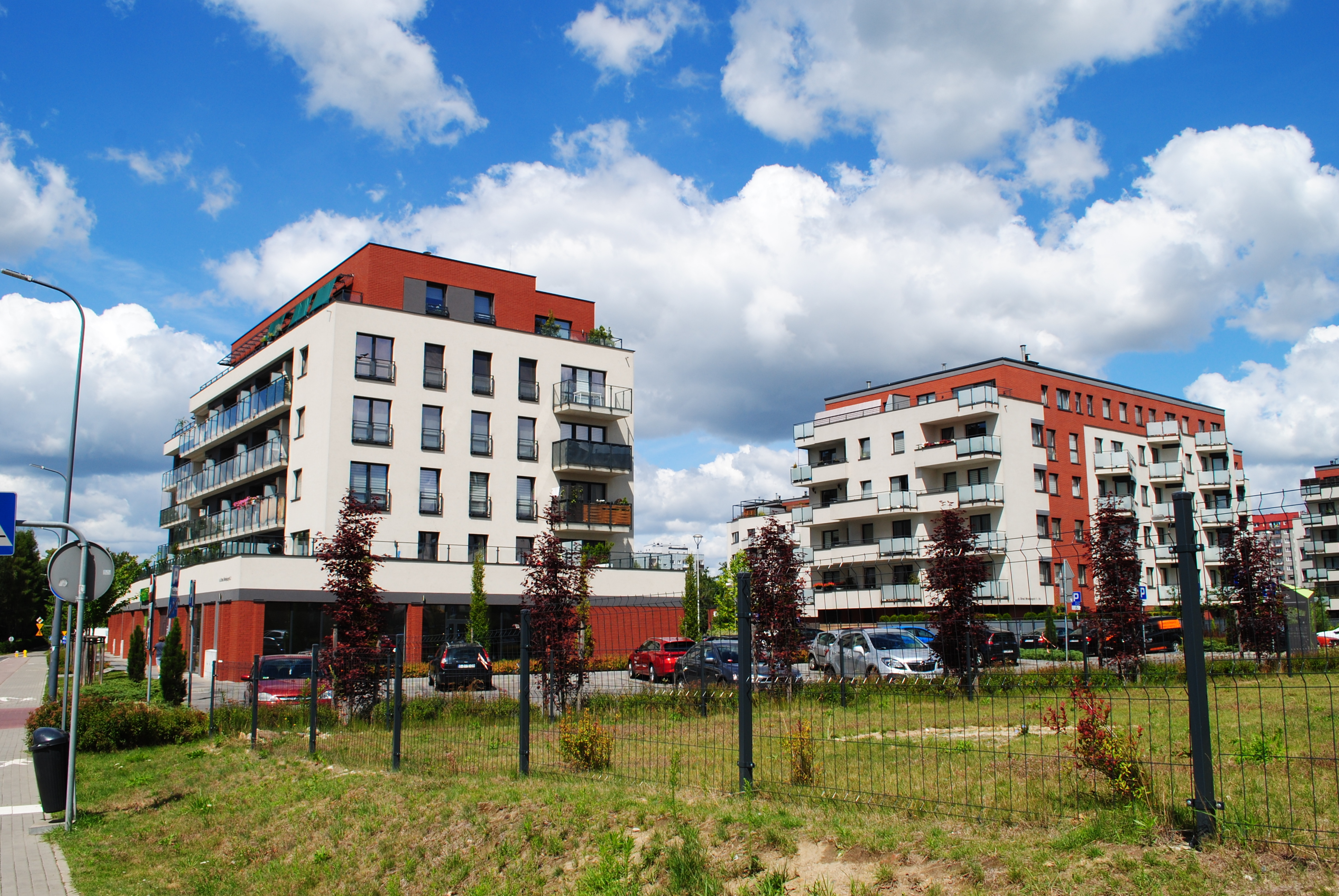
Part of Osiedle Franciszkańskie in the area of Braci Mniejszych Street

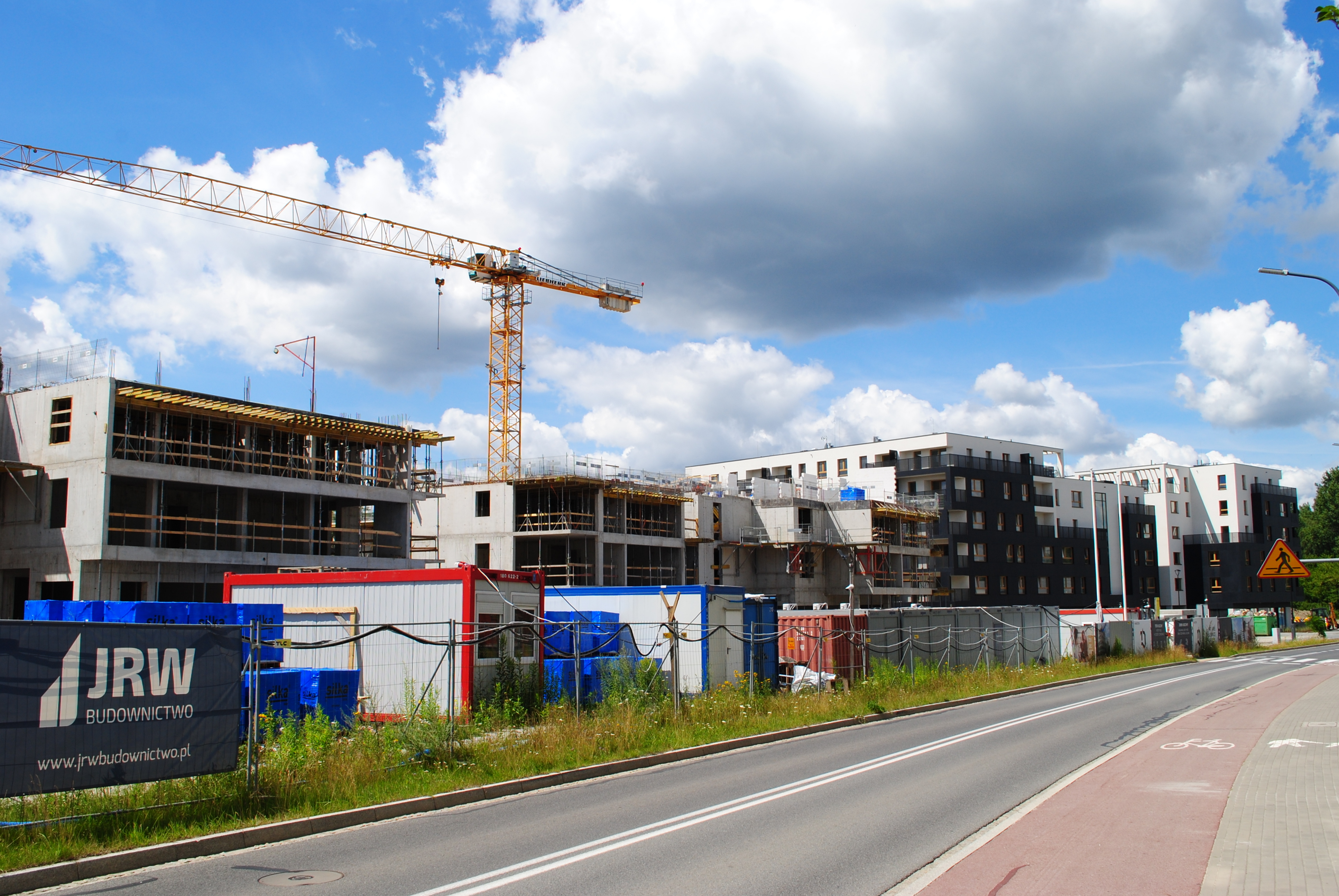
Construction of Osiedle Franciszkańskie Południe (July 2022)

Since 1989, the architecture and urban planning of the southern part of Katowice have been characterized by a trend toward the construction of new residential buildings, mainly single-family and townhouses, as well as mixed-use developments. This area has seen the highest number of mixed-use developments in Katowice. The new buildings blend in with the district's existing constructions, especially in terms of height. At that time, new development in Ligota-Panewniki was taking place mainly between Stare Panewniki and Kokociniec.

Along with the growth of residential development in the southern districts of Katowice, there is also a noticeable shortage of roads relative to the expanding housing construction in the area. Additionally, the location of many housing developments in the south, on previously undeveloped land, necessitates the construction of commercial, cultural, and entertainment facilities. The largest facility of this type is Libero Katowice, located on Tadeusz Kościuszko Street, whose construction was completed in 2018.

Between 1989 and 2011, the following residential developments, among others, were built within the boundaries of Ligota-Panewniki:

- Zielona Aleja (Panewnicka Street) – a gated community consisting of 24 houses, developed by Centrum Developer;
- Koszykowa Street – a complex of 46 single-family homes and 2 multi-family apartment buildings, each with 9 units, developed by Dombud;
- Koszykowa Street – a complex of 5 multi-family buildings, developed by Exland;
- Łąkowa Street – a gated community consisting of 32 single-family homes and 3 multi-family buildings, each with 6 apartments, developed by Exland;
- Owsiana Street – a complex of 4 single-family homes and 1 apartment building with 14 flats, developed by Exland;
- Panewnicka Street – a complex of 3 multi-family houses with 30 apartments, developed by Dombud;
- Panewnicka and Partyzantów streets – a complex of 2 apartment buildings with 70 flats, developed by Exland;
- Osiedle Uroczysko (Bałtycka Street) – a complex of 3 three-story buildings with 25 apartments, developed by J. W. Construction Holding;
- Panewnicka Street – a gated community consisting of 59 townhouses, developed by PB Feniks;
- Panewnicka Street – a gated community consisting of approximately 100 single-family homes in row and semi-detached configurations, developed by Dombud;
- E. Bojanowski and Zamiejska streets – a complex of 59 single-family homes and 8 multi-family homes, developed by Dombud;
- Ogrody Colony (Panewnicka and Rzeczna streets) – a gated community consisting of 9 row houses, developed by Eurodom 2004;
- Sadyba housing estate (Jutrzenki, Urocza, Szojdy, and Szafirowa streets) – a mix of single-family and multi-family housing from the 1990s;
- Zielona Street – a complex of two 4-story multi-family buildings, developed by Dombud;
- Osiedle Świerkowe (Twarda Street) – a gated community consisting of 25 single-family homes, developed by Katowice Housing Cooperative;
- Osiedle Książęce (Piotrowicka Street) – a complex of 22 apartment buildings, each with 10 flats, developed by CK Modus;
- Borsall Apartments (Franciszkańska and Smolna streets) – an exclusive apartment building, developed by BD Inwestor;
- Żeromskiego Apartments (S. Żeromski Street) – a 4-story apartment building, developed by BD Inwestor.

Between 2007 and 2010, Osiedle Książęce was built near the intersection of Książęca and Piotrowicka streets, with Ryszard Jurkowski as the main designer. In October 2011, the design of this housing estate received the 2010 SARP Award of the Year. The housing estate was recognized, among other things, for its successful attempt to revive the spirit of Silesian residential architecture. Between 2014 and 2022, another large residential housing estate – Osiedle Franciszkańskie – was also built in the area of Kijowska Street. The developer of the estate was the Katowice-based company TDJ Estate. It was built in phases on the grounds of the former PEMUG plant.

=== Housing estates, settlements, and colonies ===
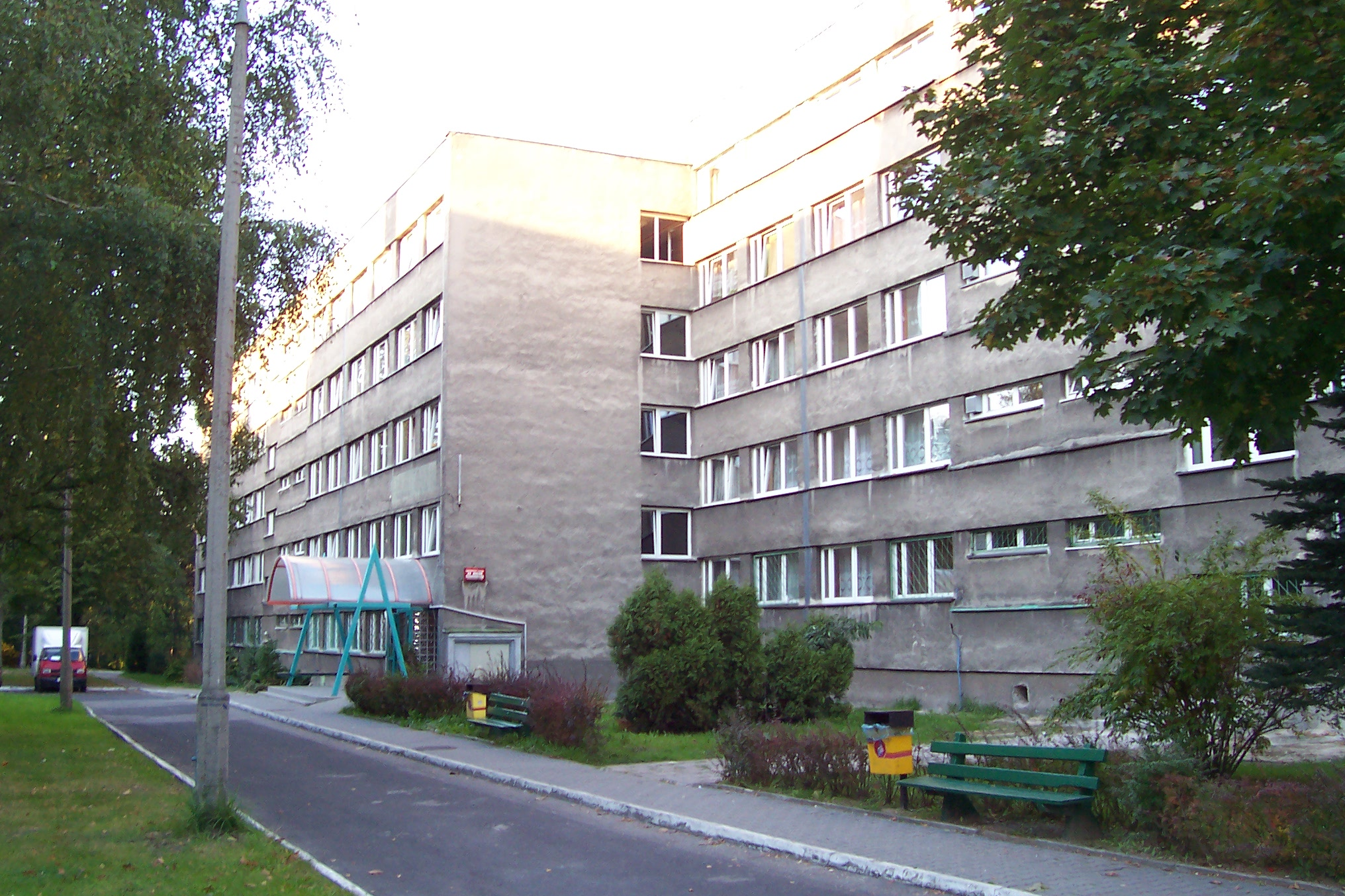
Student Hall No. 2 at Osiedle Akademickie of the University of Silesia (2006)

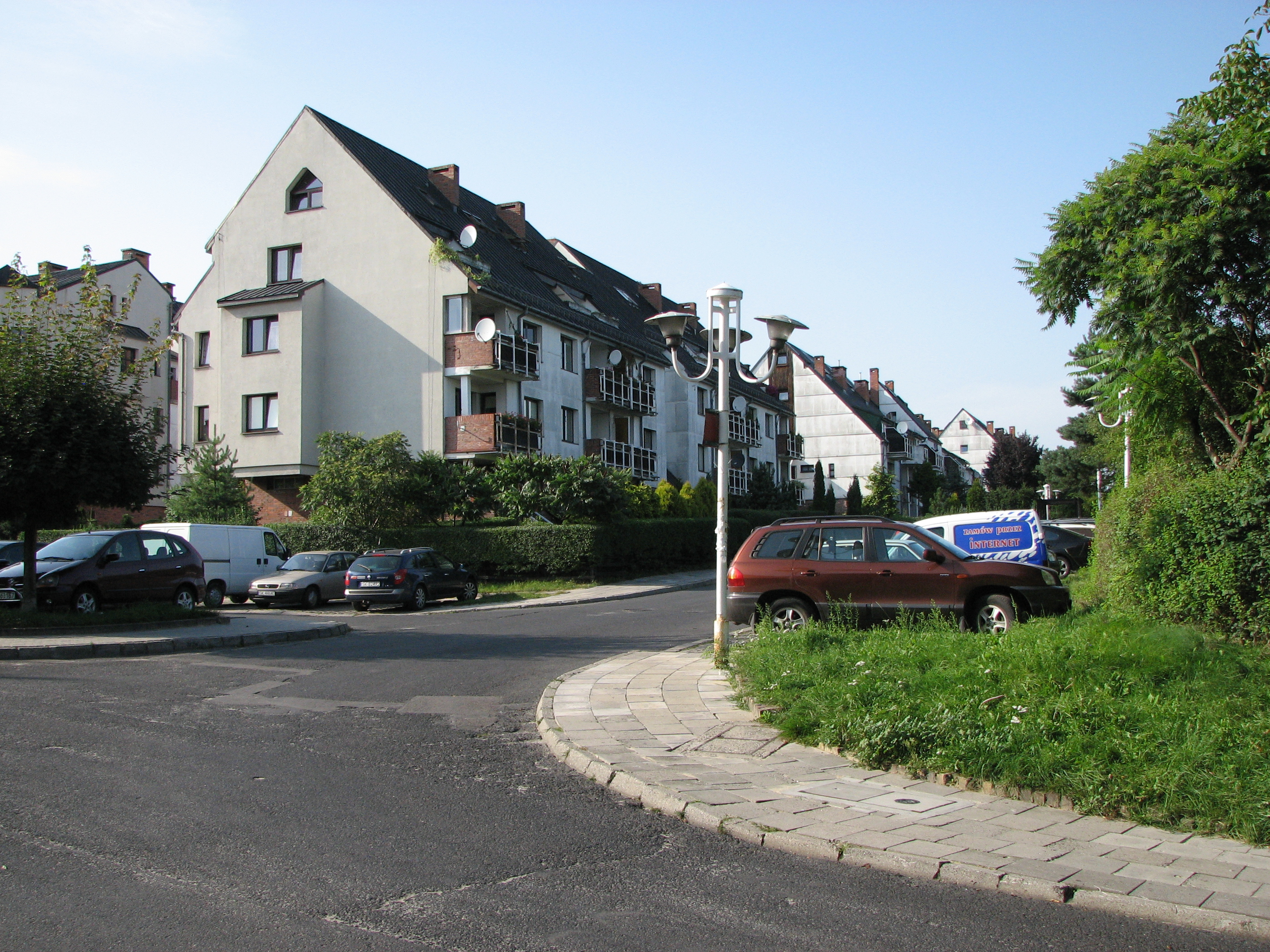
Part of Sadyba housing estate

- Kokociniec – a part of Katowice, located on the border between Katowice and Ruda Śląska, near the Kłodnica. It developed near Panewniki, around an ironworks built in the mid-17th century. In the 1970s and 1980s, a housing estate was erected there;
- Osiedle Akademickie – a housing estate located on Studencka Street, near Zadole Park. It consists of three student dormitories from the 1960s: No. 1 (formerly Stonoga), No. 2 (formerly Aplikant), No. 7 (formerly Szpital);
- Osiedle Franciszkańskie – a housing estate built between 2014 and 2022, located near Kijowska Street. It consists of 21 buildings with over 1,000 apartments;
- Osiedle Książęce – a housing estate built between 2007 and 2010, located in the area of Książęca and Piotrowicka streets. It consists of 22 four-story buildings;
- Sadyba – a housing estate in the area of Krucza and Szafirowa streets. It consists of three-story apartment buildings and single-family homes;
- Voivodeship Civil Servants' Colony – a colony located in the area of streets named after Polish regions during the interwar period (including Wileńska, Mazowiecka, Pomorska, Poleska, Śląska, Małopolska, and Huculska). It consists of modern residential villas built for civil servants working in the center of Katowice. Later development disrupted the original urban concept of a garden city;
- Wymysłów – a part of Katowice that was formerly a hamlet of Panewniki, located between the Kłodnica and Ślepiotka rivers, in the area of Panewnicka, Partyzantów, and Bałtycka streets. The rural part of the settlement survived until the 1940s, while during the Polish People's Republic, housing estates consisting of multi-story apartment blocks and single-family homes were built there;
- Zadole – a part of Katowice, located on the border of Piotrowice-Ochojec and Ligota-Panewniki, in the area of Zadole, Śląska, Studencka, Traktorzystów, A. Asnyk, Armii Krajowej, and Polarna streets. It was established as a hamlet of Piotrowice in the 19th century.

=== Historic buildings ===
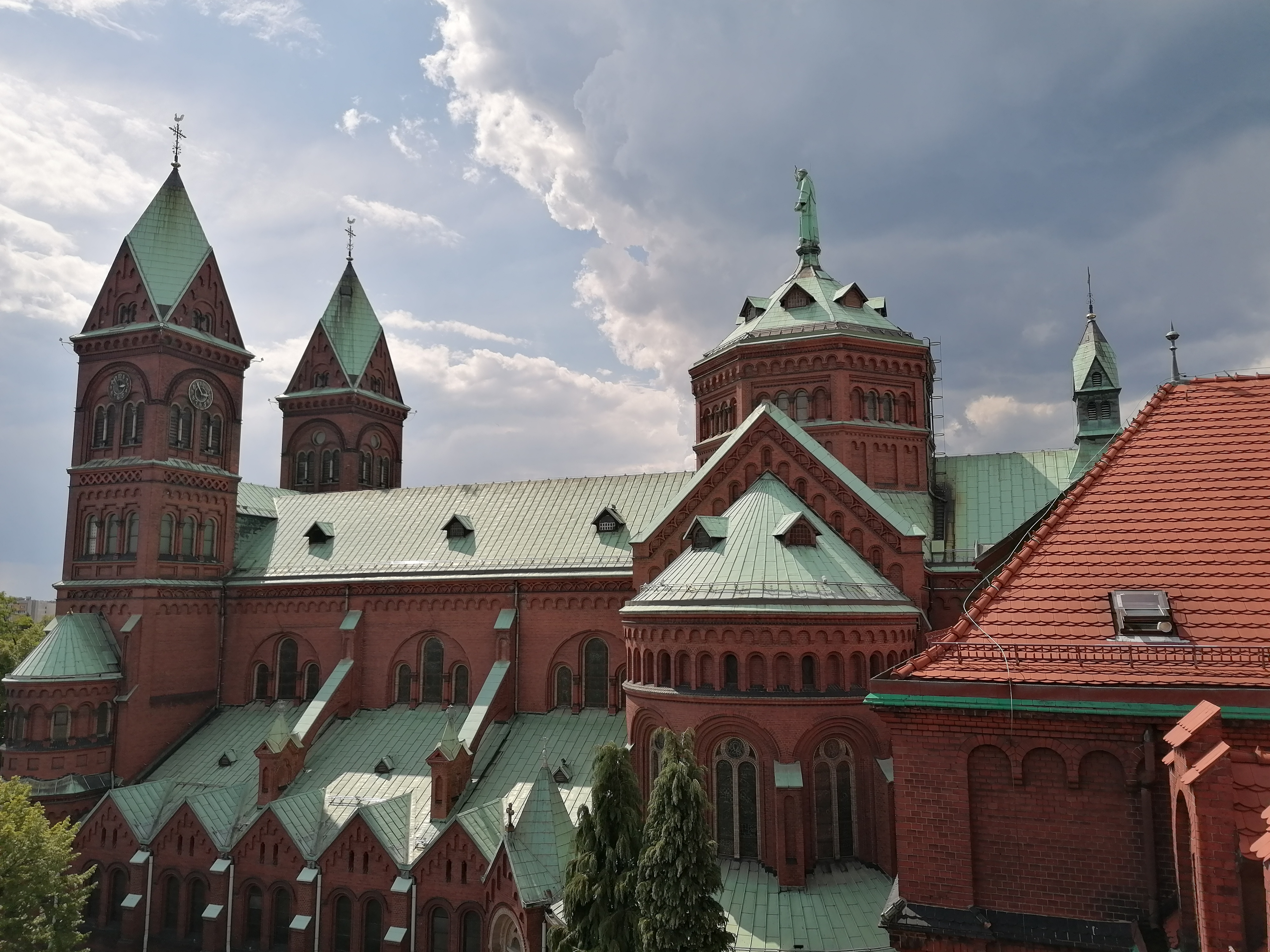
Basilica of St. Louis the King and the Assumption of Mary

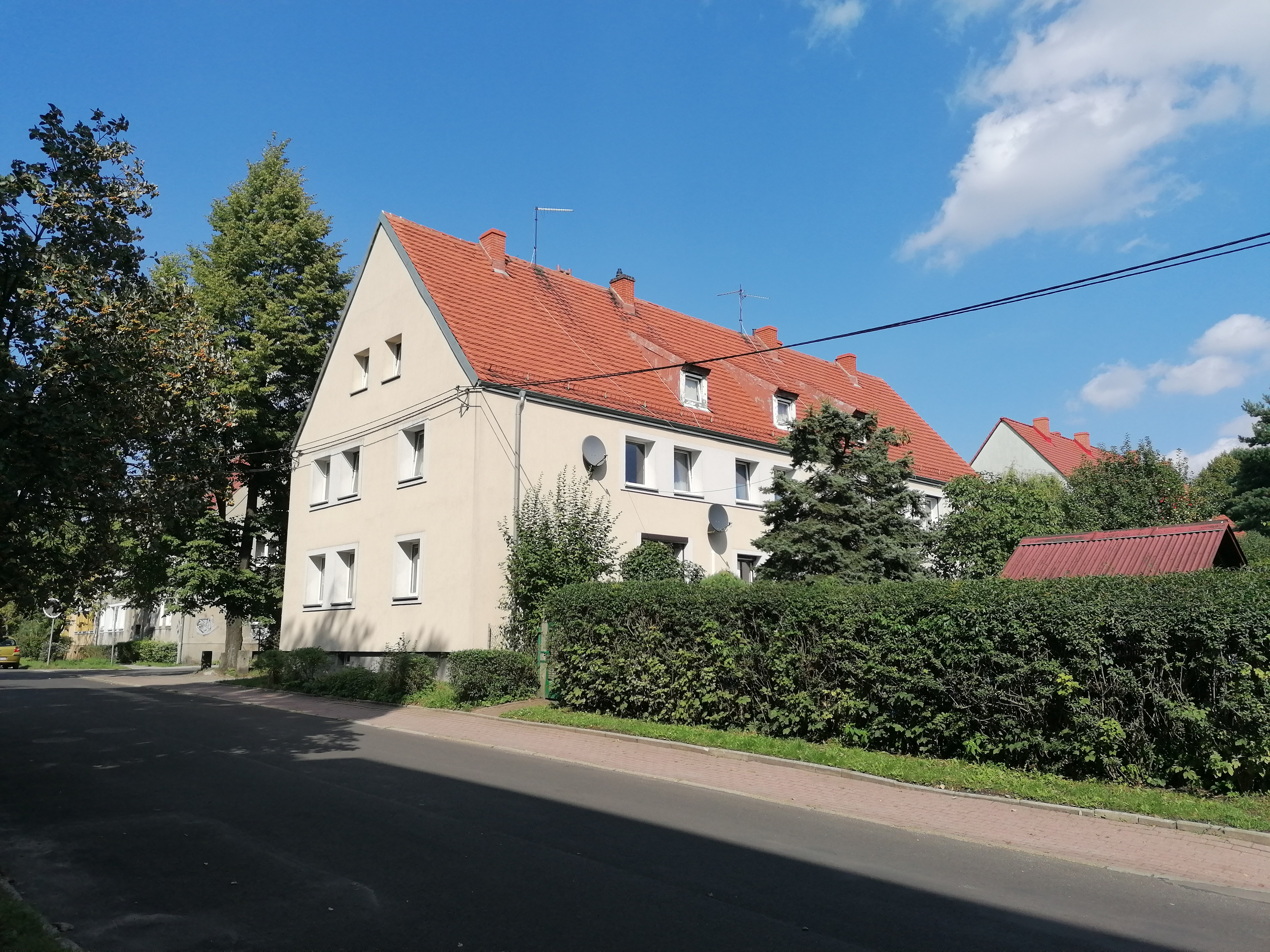
Multi-family residential buildings, the so-called "barns" (Bronisława Street)

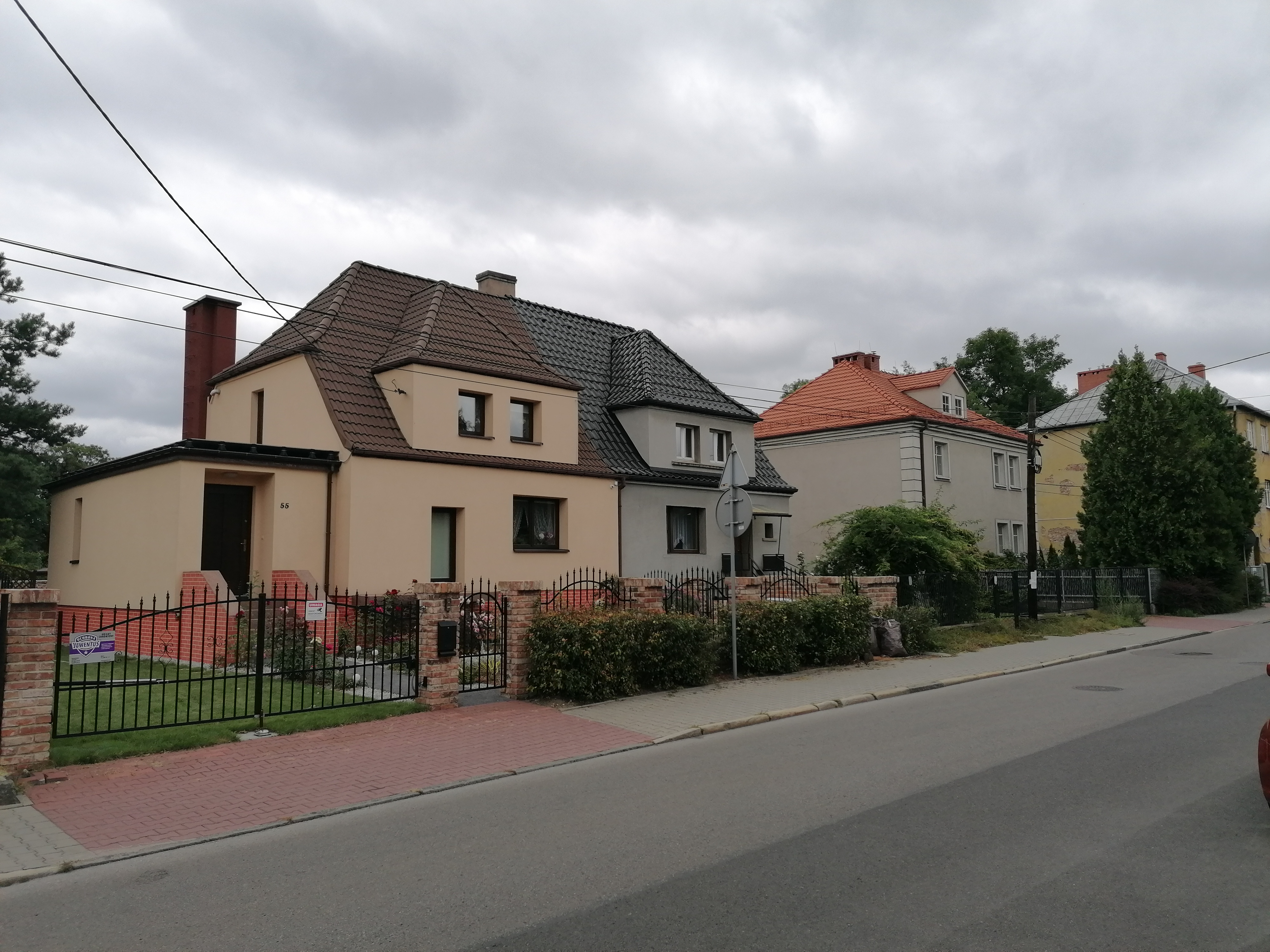
Garden houses at Franciszkańska Street

The only structure listed in the Registry of Cultural Property located in Ligota-Panewniki is the Franciscan monastery complex built between 1905 and 1908, which consists of the Basilica of St. Louis the King and the Assumption of Mary, the monastery, and the garden (park). The Renaissance Revival church in Panewniki is built on a Latin cross plan. It has three naves, including a main nave 76 m long and 12 m wide; at the intersection of the main nave and the transept stands a 3-meter-high dome crowned with a 7-meter-high gunmetal statue of St. Francis of Assisi. The architectural design of the church shows a strong influence from Rhenish churches of the mature Romanesque period, and it includes references to the brick Neo-Medieval style – the so-called "transitional style". The complex was entered into the Registry of Cultural Property on 19 February 1973 under no. 1202/73.

The following structures in Ligota-Panewniki are protected under local zoning plans (October 2009):

- building (79 Kijowska Street) from the 1920s–1930s with preserved historicist elements on the façade;
- building (10 K. Opaliński Street) from 1935 in the brick historicist style;
- buildings (2 K. Grzesik Street; 91, 93, and 95 Kijowska Street) from the early 20th century in the brick historicist style;
- residential building with commercial space (63 Piotrowicka Street);
- house with a garden (26 Zagroda Street);
- houses (23 Panewnicka Street, 37 Piotrowicka Street) from the 1940s;
- multi-family houses, the so-called "barns" (22, 24, 26, 28, 30, 32, 38, 40, 42, 44, 46, and 48 Piotrowicka Street) from the 1940s;
- houses with gardens (48, 49, 51, 53/55, 63, and 67 Franciszkańska Street);
- tenement (30 Panewnicka Street) from the 1930s in the International Style;
- tenement – formerly a restaurant and guesthouse (40 Panewnicka Street) from the 1930s;
- tenements with gardens (4 Franciszkańska Street; 36/38 Panewnicka Street; 58/60 Piotrowicka Street) from the 1930s in the International Style;
- school (13 Panewnicka Street) from between 1936 and 1938 in the International Style, rebuilt in the 1950s;
- villa with a garden (13 Smolna Street);
- villa with a garden (61 Piotrowicka Street) from the first quarter of the 20th century in the modern style;
- villas with gardens (4, 6, 7 and 9 O. K. Bik Street; 2, 3, 4, 5, 6, 8, 9, 10, 11, and 13 Kaszubska Street; 7 Kłodnicka Street; 1, 3, 5, 9, and 11 Mazowiecka Street; 2, 4, 6, 8, and 10 Mazurska Street; 27, 34, and 38a Panewnicka Street), mostly from the 1930s in the International Style;
- multi-family residential buildings 1–15 odd, 4–22 even, 10a, b and c, 22–44 even, 34a, b, c and d, 36a, b, c and d Kołobrzeska Street; 26a, b, c and d, 30a, b, c and d, 34, 36, 46a, b and c, 50a, b and c Piotrowicka Street; 2–14 even, 1–13 odd Słupska Street; 2, 2a, b and c Koszalińska Street) from the 1950s in the socialist realist style.

The following conservation zones or areas proposed for protection are located in Ligota-Panewniki:

- residential buildings – the so-called "barns" from the 1940s;
- residential buildings of the former Ida Iron Works and a forester's lodge;
- houses with gardens – a railway workers' colony from the interwar period;
- Voivodeship Civil Servants' Colony – houses with gardens in the International Style, mainly from the 1930s;
- Sisters of the Servants' monastery and cemetery;
- housing estate – socialist realist buildings from the 1950s;
- group of residential buildings with gardens – from the early 20th century and the interwar period.

=== Monuments and memorial sites ===
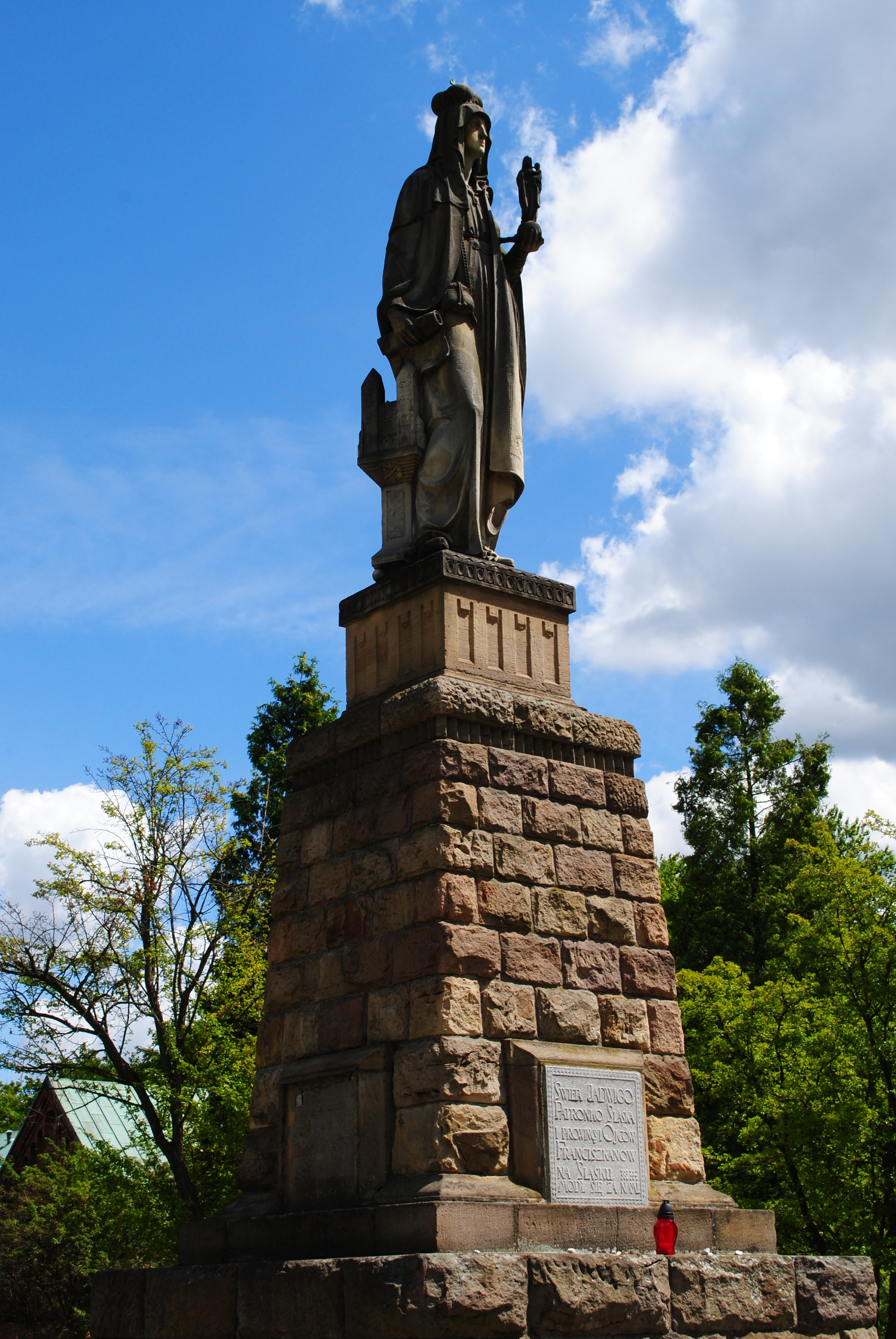
Monument of St. Hedwig of Silesia from 1912 (Klasztorny Square)

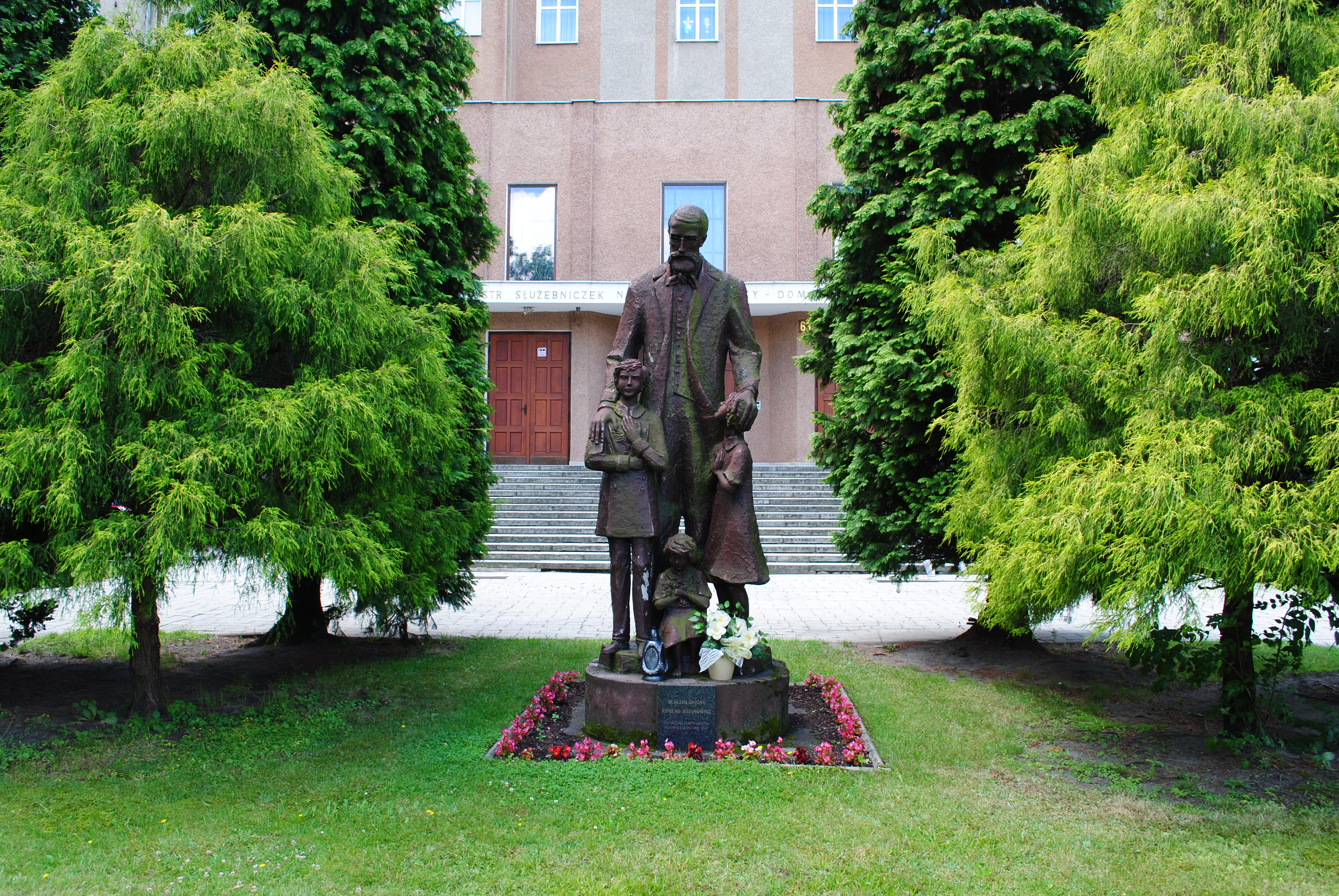
Monument of E. Bojanowski (63 Panewnicka Street; in front of the provincial house of the Sisters of the Servants)

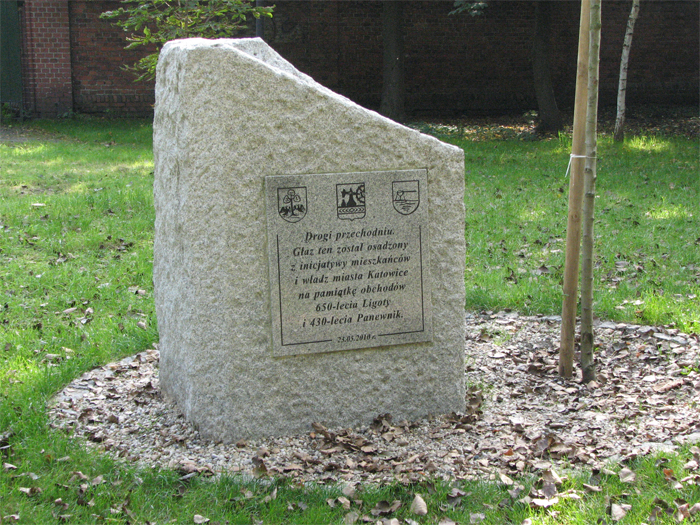
Boulder commemorating the 650th anniversary of Ligota and the 430th anniversary of Panewniki

Monuments and memorial sites:

- Pope's Oak (Klasztorny Square), planted on 18 May 2008;
- Kalwaria Panewnicka – a complex of 14 stations of the Way of the Cross and 15 Rosary chapels covering an area of 8 hectares. This site also has a replica of the Grotto of Lourdes from 1905. The calvary grounds include boulders commemorating the arrival of the Franciscans in Panewniki, the 650th anniversary of Ligota, and the 430th anniversary of Panewniki. Kalwaria Panewnicka was built over many years, between 1936 and 1963, and one of the initiators of its establishment was the Panewniki parson, Father Karol Bik-Dzieszowski;
- shrine (Panewnicka Street 274) – brick, from the early 20th century;
- roadside cross (260 Panewnicka Street) from the early 20th century;
- cross commemorating the Battle of Monte Cassino in 1944 (Panewnicka Street; Franciscan basilica – side chapel);
- cross of prisoners of the Auschwitz concentration camp in Oświęcim (Panewnicka Street; Franciscan basilica – side chapel);
- Monument of Edmund Bojanowski (63 Panewnicka Street; in front of the provincial house of the Sisters of the Servants) – a monument set on a small socle depicting Edmund Bojanowski embracing three children. It was designed by Sister Czesława Marek;
- Monument of St. Hedwig of Silesia (Klasztorny Square) – a monument located across from the Panewniki basilica, erected in 1912. The designer was Bruno Tschötschel. It depicts St. Hedwig of Silesia, whose statue stands on a socle;
- Monument to the Defenders of Katowice (cemetery on Panewnicka Street) – a monument dedicated to the defenders of Katowice who died in 1939 at the hands of the Germans;
- Monument of the Victims of Stalinism (cemetery on Panewnicka Street) – a monument commemorating the victims of the Stalinist period, with the inscription "Gloria Victis", a cross, and national coat of arms;
- symbolic grave of Jan Giemza (Bałtycka Street) – a grave at the place where he was murdered by the Germans on 13 October 1944.

Commemorative plaques:

- commemorative plaque of Adela Korczyńska, codenamed Zośka, commander of the Women's Military Service of the Silesian District of the Home Army (23 Zielonogórska Street; Primary School No. 35);
- commemorative plaque of Father Rafał Grzondziel (Panewnicka Street; Franciscan basilica);
- commemorative plaque dedicated to Silesian scouts who died or were tortured between 1939 and 1945 (13 Panewnicka Street, Scout Defenders of Katowice High School; inside the building) – tombstones of Silesian scouts and insurgents murdered in Katowice in 1939, transferred from a grave at the cemetery in Panewniki;
- plaque commemorating Soviet prisoners of war murdered in the spring of 1940 in the camps in Kozelsk, Ostashkov, and Starobilsk (Panewnicka Street; Franciscan basilica);
- plaque commemorating the consecration of the Franciscan Basilica of St. Louis the King and the Assumption of Mary in 1908 (76 Panewnicka Street; basilica façade);
- plaque commemorating those who fought in the ranks of Konspiracyjne Wojsko Polskie, the Home Army, the National Armed Forces, the Freedom and Independence Association, and other independence underground organizations, who were murdered and buried in unmarked graves after a ruling by the Katowice Military Court between 1945 and 1956 (Panewnicka Street; Franciscan basilica);
- plaque commemorating monks who died and were murdered in concentration camps during World War II (Panewnicka Street; Franciscan basilica);
- plaque commemorating soldiers of the Polish Armed Forces in the West who fought on the Western Fronts for Poland's freedom and independence between 1939 and 1945 (Panewnicka Street; Franciscan basilica – side chapel) – plaque unveiled on the 53rd anniversary of the Battle of Bologna;
- plaque commemorating the 100th anniversary of the arrival of the Franciscans in Panewniki (439 Panewnicka Street) – plaque unveiled on 22 December 2002 on the façade of the building that served as the first headquarters of the Franciscan Order in Panewniki;
- plaques commemorating places of execution from World War II (Panewniki Forests).

=== Zoning ===
Ligota-Panewniki is one of the areas with a high concentration of single-family housing – as of December 2007, these areas covered more than 100 hectares. There was also a clearly defined area of multi-family housing there. At that time, significant areas (50–100 ha) were also occupied by industrial and commercial zones, and over 75 ha of the district consisted of undeveloped green spaces. The share of developed land in Ligota-Panewniki in 2007 was 22%, the floor area ratio (net) was 0.37, and the average number of stories was 1.68.

In the Study of Conditions and Directions of Spatial Development of the City of Katowice, the city was divided into urban planning units, including the Ligota-Panewniki unit, which extends to both the district and part of Piotrowice-Ochojec up to Tadeusz Kościuszko Street and the Katowice–Mikołów railway. In terms of actual land use in January 2008 for the Ligota-Panewniki urban unit (1,563.22 ha), the largest areas were occupied by: single-family residential areas (155.05 ha), service areas (100.74 ha), transportation areas (116.99 ha), undeveloped green areas (116.51 ha), and forests (740.22 ha). The smallest areas were those of technical infrastructure (2.33 ha), agricultural land (10.71 ha), water bodies (15.53 ha), and wasteland (4.69 ha). As of July 2009, 3.72% of the Ligota-Panewniki urban planning unit was covered by local zoning regulations, while plans for 99.50% of the unit's area were in the process of being drafted at that time.

== Education ==
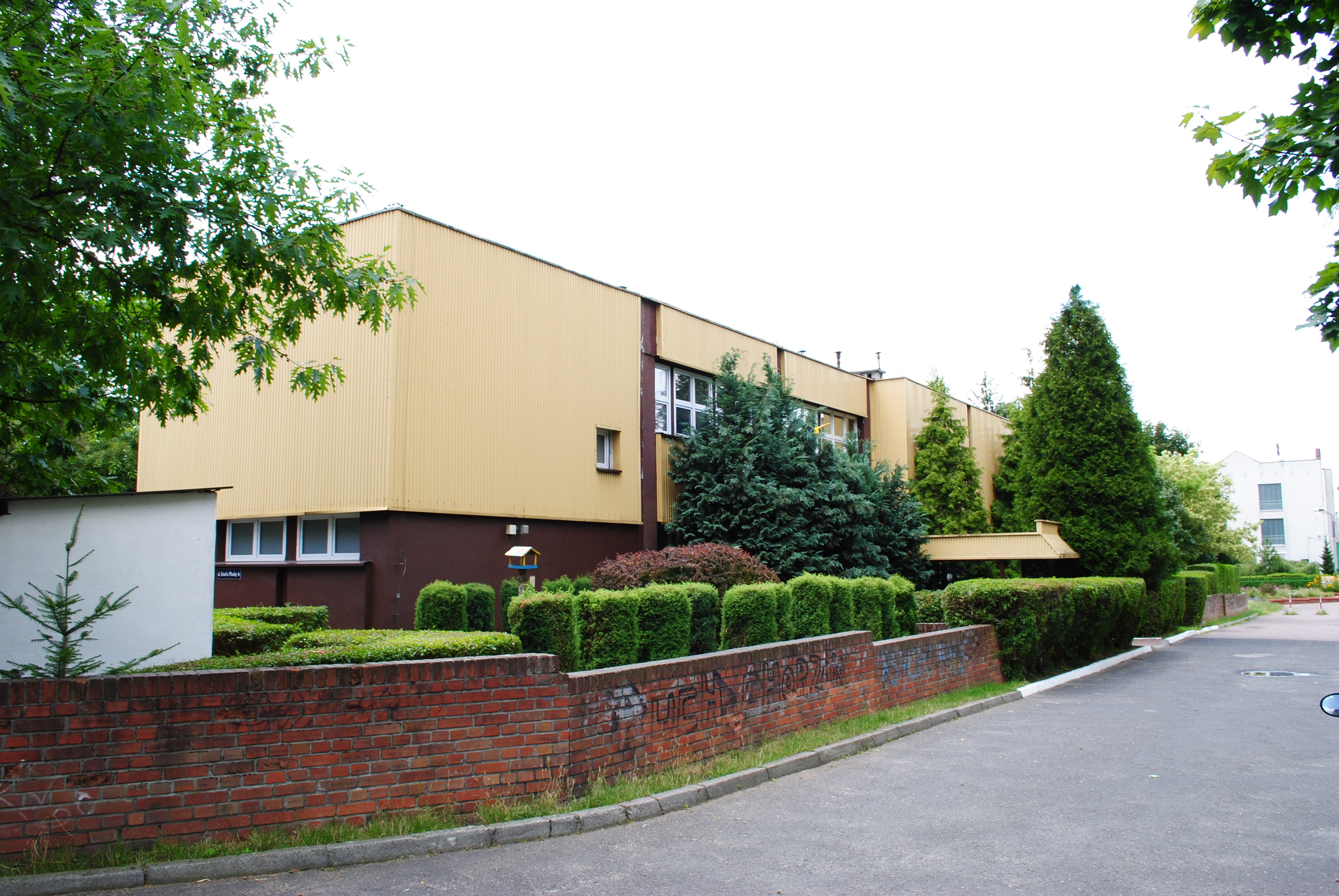
Municipal Kindergarten No. 99 (6 J. Płocha Street)

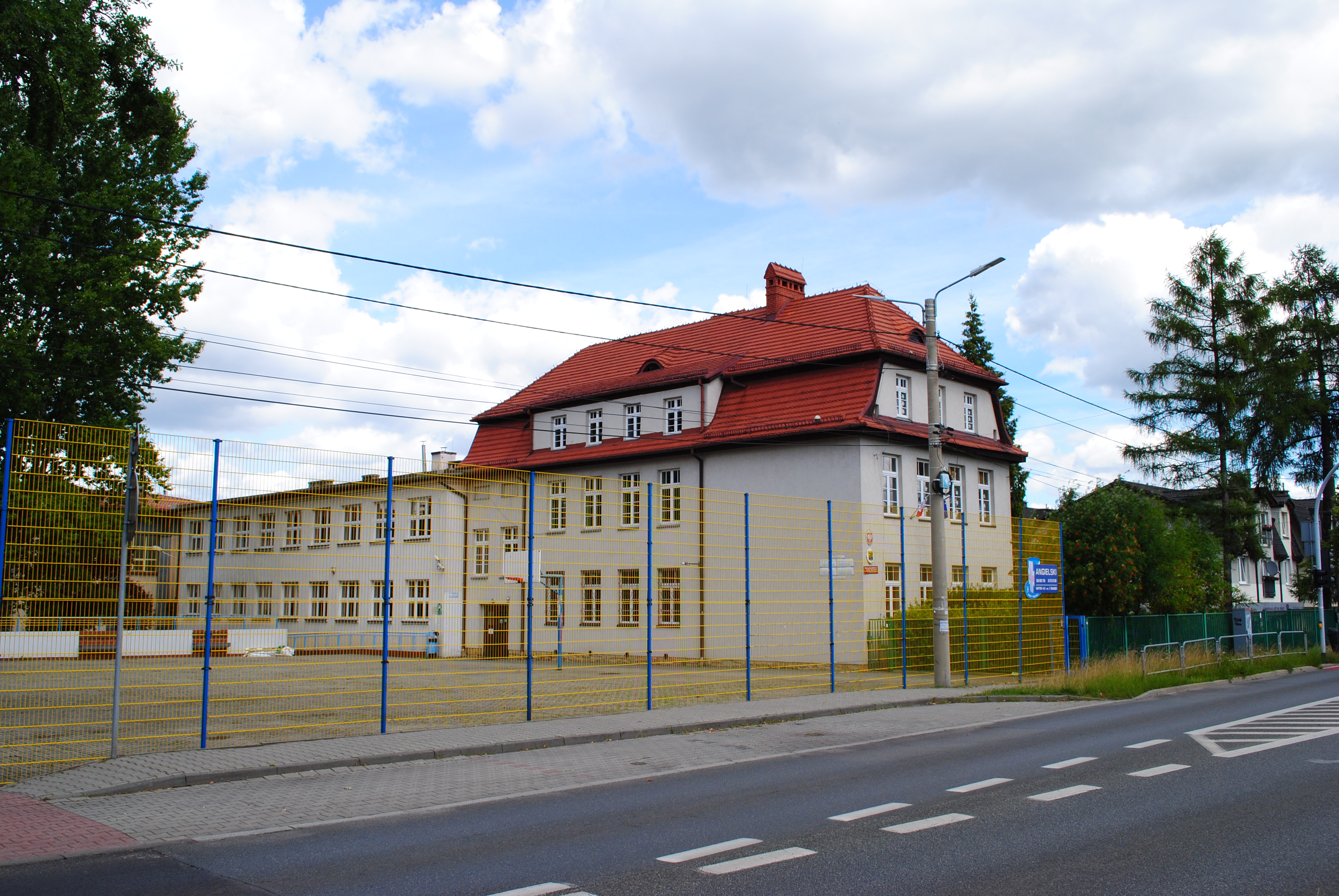
Jan Brzechwa Primary School No. 9 (172 Panewnicka Street)

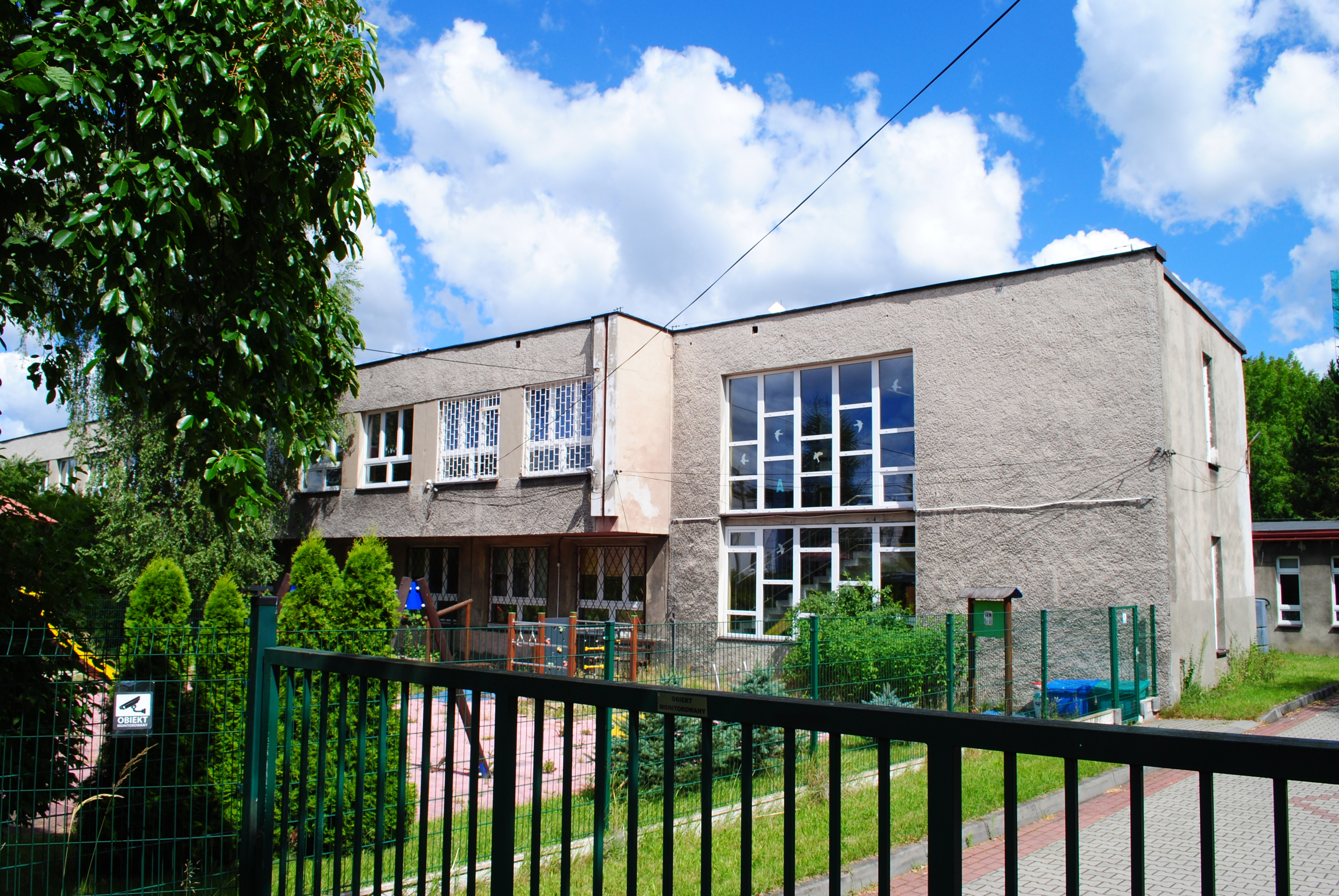
Polish Knights of Malta Special Primary School No. 61 (8 Kołobrzeska Street)

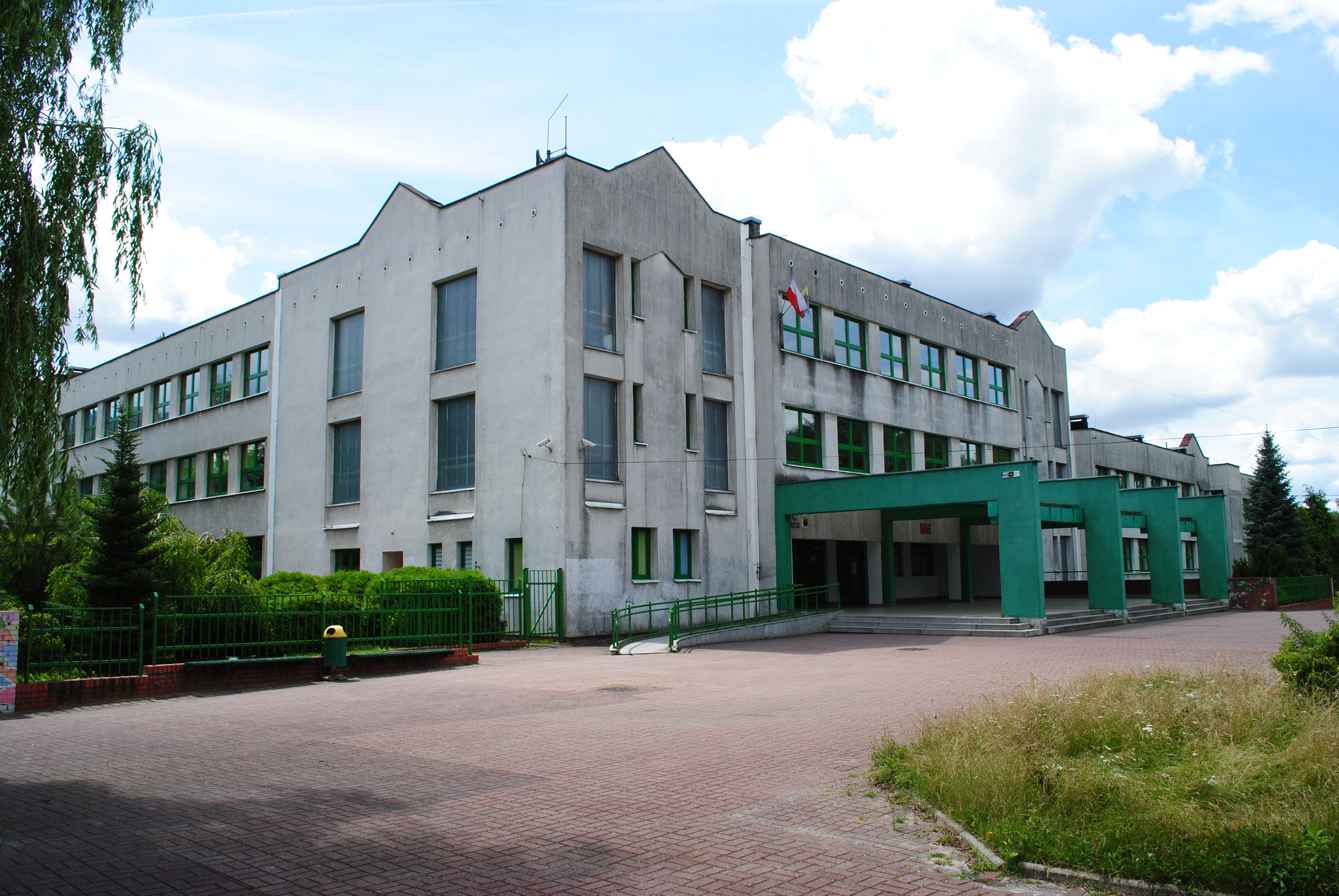
Commission of National Education Primary School No. 67 with Integration Classes (5 Zielona Street)

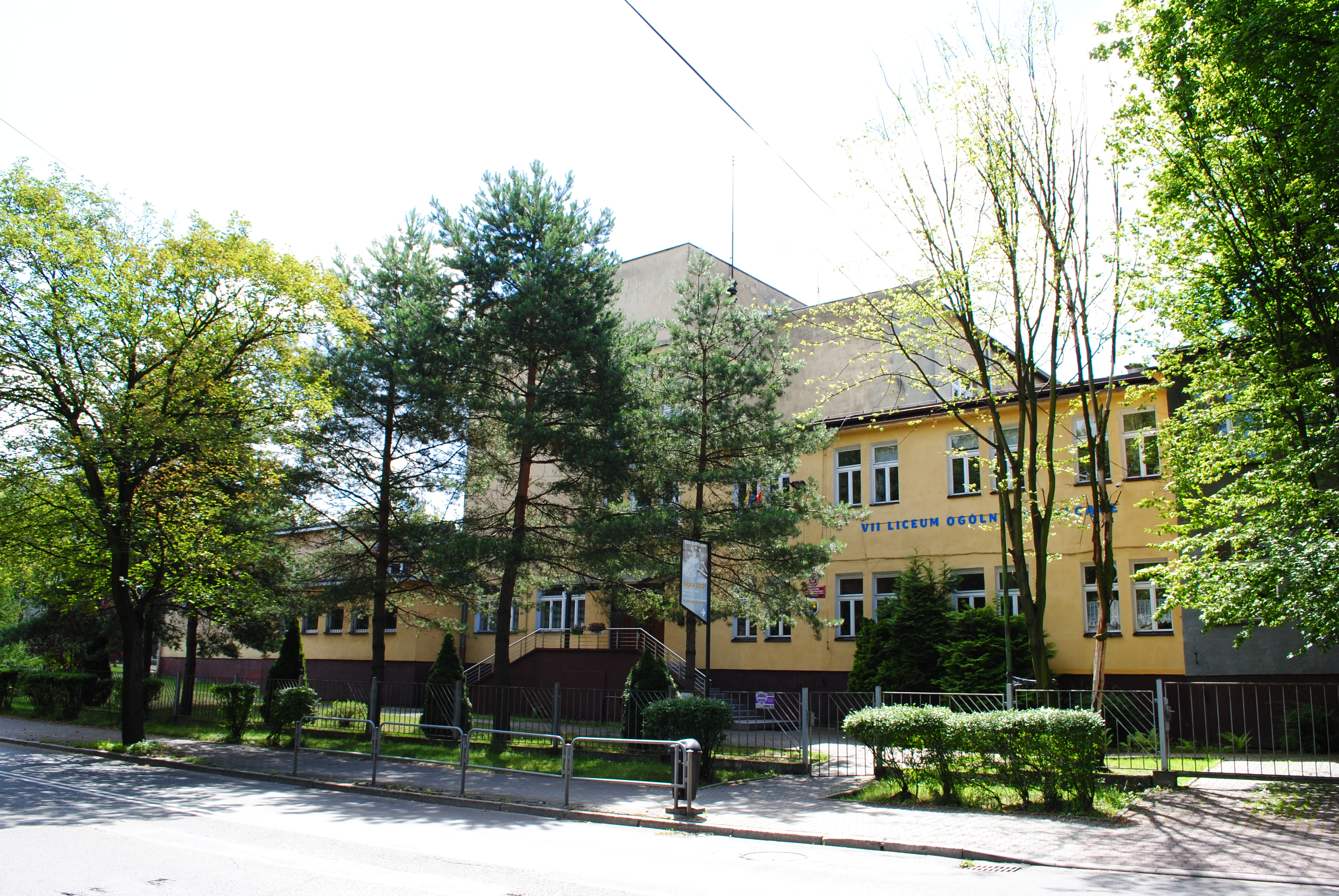
Scout Defenders of Katowice High School (13 Panewnicka Street)

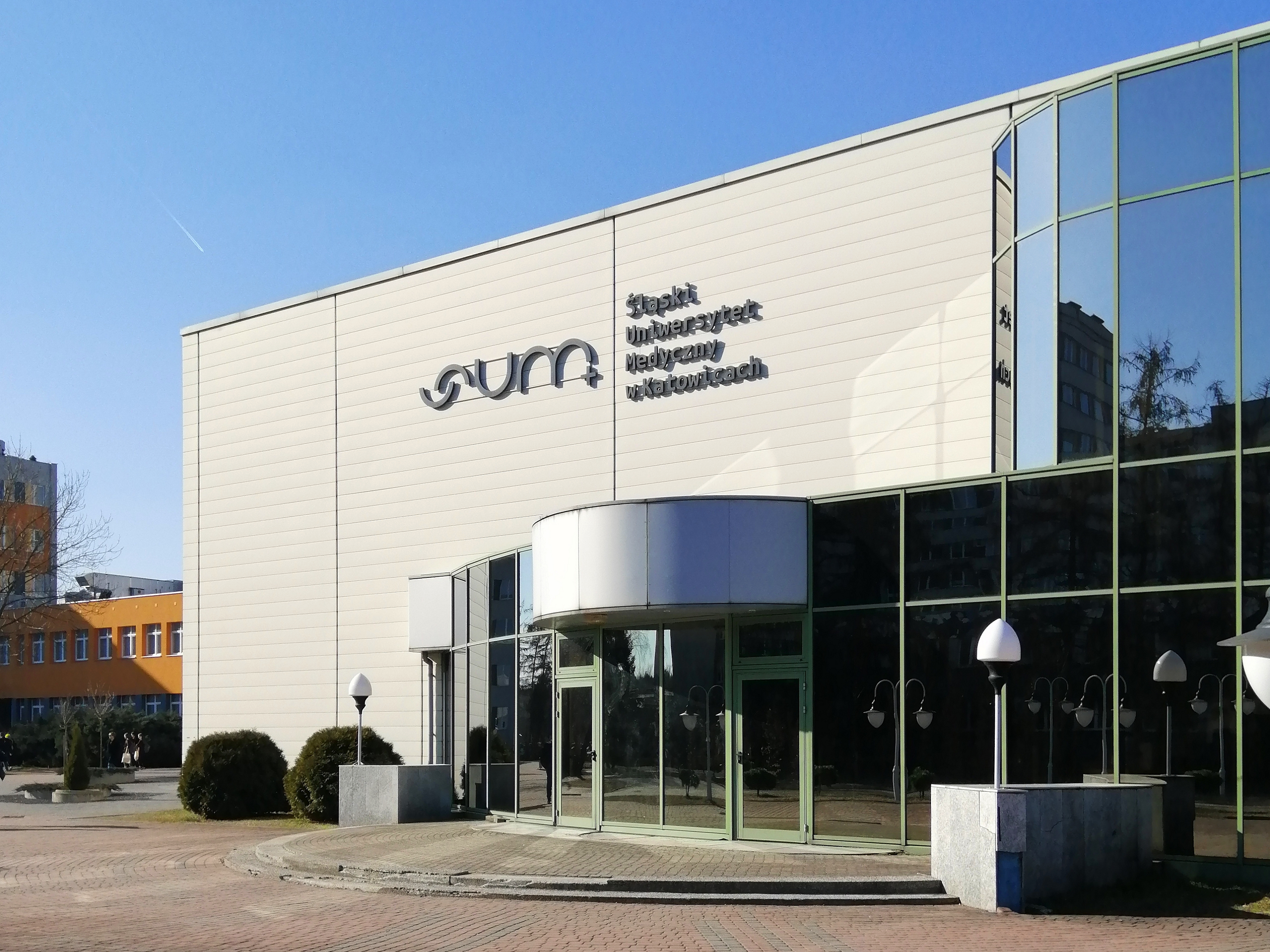
Faculty of Medical Sciences of the Medical University of Silesia (18 Medyków Street)

At the beginning of 2023, the following educational and childcare facilities were located in Ligota-Panewniki:

- Nurseries:
  - Private Puchatkowo Nursery Academia Malucha (7 Huculska Street);
  - Private Elementarz Przyjazny Rodzinie Nursery (20 Studencka Street);
  - Private Konsek Świata Nursery (4 Braci Mniejszych Street);
  - Private Wesołe Misie Nursery (76c Piotrowicka Street);
  - Municipal Nursery in Katowice – Branch of the Municipal Nursery (24a Zadole Street);
- Kindergartens:
  - Municipal Kindergarten No. 16 (6a Koszalińska Street);
  - Municipal Kindergarten No. 40 (73 Panewnicka Street);
  - Municipal Kindergarten No. 99 (6 J. Płocha Street);
  - Private Elementarz Kindergarten (20 Studencka Street);
  - Private Madzik Place Kindergarten Language Kindergarten (14 Szafirowa Street);
  - Private Sezamkowo Kindergarten (154 Panewnicka Street);
  - Private Skrable Kindergarten (5 Szafirowa Street);
  - Private aAcademy Special Kindergarten (1 Zielonogórska Street);
  - Private Edmund Bojanowski Kindergarten of the Congregation of the Sisters of the Servants (63 Panewnicka Street);
- Primary schools:
  - Private Special Arka Noego Primary School (59 Gromadzka Street);
  - Private aAcademy Primary School (1 Zielonogórska Street);
  - Private Primary School of the Elementarz Foundation (18 Studencka Street);
  - Jan Brzechwa Primary School No. 9 (172 Panewnicka Street);
  - Special Polish Knights of Malta Primary School No. 61 (8 Kołobrzeska Street);
  - Mountain Rescuers Primary School No. 64 (27 Medyków Street);
  - Commission of National Education Primary School No. 67 with Integration Classes (5 Zielona Street);
- High schools:
  - Scout Defenders of Katowice High School (13 Panewnicka Street);
- School complexes:
  - School-Kindergarten Complex No. 14 (23 Zielonogórska Street):
    - Municipal Kindergarten No. 15 with Integration Classes (23 Zielonogórska Street),
    - Municipal Kindergarten No. 76 (20a Kołobrzeska Street),
    - Municipal Kindergarten No. 89 (26a Zadole Street),
    - Adela Korczyńska Primary School No. 35 with Bilingual Classes (23 Zielonogórska Street);
  - School-Kindergarten Complex No. 15 (3 Zielonogórska Street):
    - Municipal Kindergarten No. 17 (6a Zielonogórska Street),
    - Nicolaus Copernicus Primary School No. 34 (3 Zielonogórska Street).

Originally, students from Ligota and Panewniki attended school in Mikołów. The first mention of the school at the Parish of St. Adalbert dates back to 1575. Students from Ligota and Panewniki attended this school only in special cases – according to statistical data from 1818, 15 children from Panewniki attended school in Mikołów. In 1819, a school in Piotrowice began operating in a new building, and the gminas of Ligota and Panewniki also contributed to the cost of its construction. In 1824, 72 children from Panewniki and 36 from Ligota attended this school.

The first school in Panewniki was opened in 1828 (or 1825) in the living room of one of the local farmers, Wawrzyniec Matura. Students attended classes from 1828 to 1840, and Matura's house was located on the site of the current building at 364 Panewnicka Street. The first teacher in Panewniki was Jan Krause.

Construction of a new brick school in Panewniki began in 1831, and was completed in 1840. It was named the Catholic School in Panewniki and initially served as a one-room school for children from Stara Kuźnia and Panewniki, while children from Ligota continued to attend school in Piotrowice. The new school was located at the present-day 435 Panewnicka Street and was built with the support of the Duke of Pszczyna. In addition to classrooms for about 100 students, the building housed apartments for the teacher and his assistant. It served its purpose until the construction of a new building in 1913 or until the 1930s.

The first school for the children of Ligota was opened in present-day Stara Ligota in 1880.

In 1908, the authorities of Gmina Panewniki undertook efforts to build a new Catholic school in Kokociniec, which was opened at the current address of 172 Panewnicka Street in 1913 or 1912 (later J. Brzechwa Primary School No. 9). In 1933, the school in Kokociniec was named after John III Sobieski, and from 23 February 1934, it bore the name Seven-Class Public King John Sobieski Primary School. Between 1936 and 1939, the building was expanded with a left wing.

The first school year in Polish schools began on 5 September 1922 with a Mass at the church in Panewniki, from where the students dispersed to their respective schools.

In 1938, a new school was opened at present-day 13 Panewnicka Street, to which Public Elementary School No. 31 was relocated from 10 Hetmańska Street on 26 January 1939.

After the entry of German troops entered Ligota and Panewniki at the start of World War II, the schools were seized by the new authorities. The new German school year began on 1 April 1940. After the hostilities and liberation from German occupation, the new school year in Ligota-Panewniki began on 20 February 1945. At that time, two schools operated in the present-day district:

- Public Primary School No. 31 (13 Panewnicka Street; the so-called "forest school");
- Seven-Class Public King John Sobieski Primary School (435 Panewnicka Street).

In 1948, Primary Schools No. 8 and No. 31 on Panewnicka Street were merged into a single school. In 1959, the school was designated No. 7, becoming a Primary School and High School (now the Scout Defenders of Katowice High School), and a kindergarten also operated there. In 1961, a new wing was added to the existing building. On 9 May 1961, the school was named after the Scouts Defenders of Katowice, and on 1 September 1966, the primary school and high school were separated – the newly established Primary School No. 29 was dissolved during the 1969/1970 school year.

In 1952, construction began on the building that would become the current M. Copernicus Primary School No. 34, located at 3 Zielonogórska Street. Before the school opened, the children attended classes on one of the floors of the building housing High School No. 7. The new school building was opened in the fall of 1956. The building of Primary School No. 35, completed in 1959, was one of the "Millennium Schools". Mountain Rescuers Primary School No. 64 at Medyków Street 27 was established in 1966, also as one of the "Millennium Schools".

In late 1966, construction began on the clinical and educational complex of the Silesian Medical Academy, located on the border between Ligota and Panewniki; this included the construction of dormitories and a hotel for nurses in 1971. In 1975, the Faculty of Medicine and the Faculty of Nursing were established. In the 1970s, the Medical Academy became the largest university of its kind in the country. From the very beginning, it became an important research center – by 2010, approximately 60,000 publications of various types had been produced there. Since 1996, the university has also been accredited to offer English-language medical programs, thanks to which students from many countries around the world study there during the academic year. In 2007, the Silesian Medical Academy was renamed the Medical University of Silesia. From 1 October 2019, the Faculty of Medicine has been known as the Faculty of Medical Sciences in.

In 1995, National Education Commission Primary School No. 67 was opened in Kokociniec. As a result of the 1999 education reform, some of the schools in the district were converted into gymnasiums:

- Primary School No. 35 – Gymnasium No. 21 (in the General Education School Complex No. 21);
- Primary School No. 64 – Gymnasium No. 23 (in the General Education School Complex No. 23).

Later, these school complexes were dissolved and transformed into independent gymnasiums. In 2000, General Education School Complex No. 21 was transformed into Gymnasium No. 21, and on 3 December 2004, the school was named after Adela Korczyńska. In 2004, General Education School Complex No. 23 was transformed into Gymnasium No. 23. On 30 August 2005, Primary School No. 67 with Integration Classes was named after the National Education Commission. In 2019, as a result of another education reform, A. Korczyńska Gymnasium No. 21 was transformed into A. Korczyńska Primary School No. 35 with Bilingual Classes, while earlier, on 1 September 2017, Mountain Rescuers Gymnasium No. 23 with Integrated Classes was transformed into the Mountain Rescuers Primary School.

== Public safety and social welfare ==
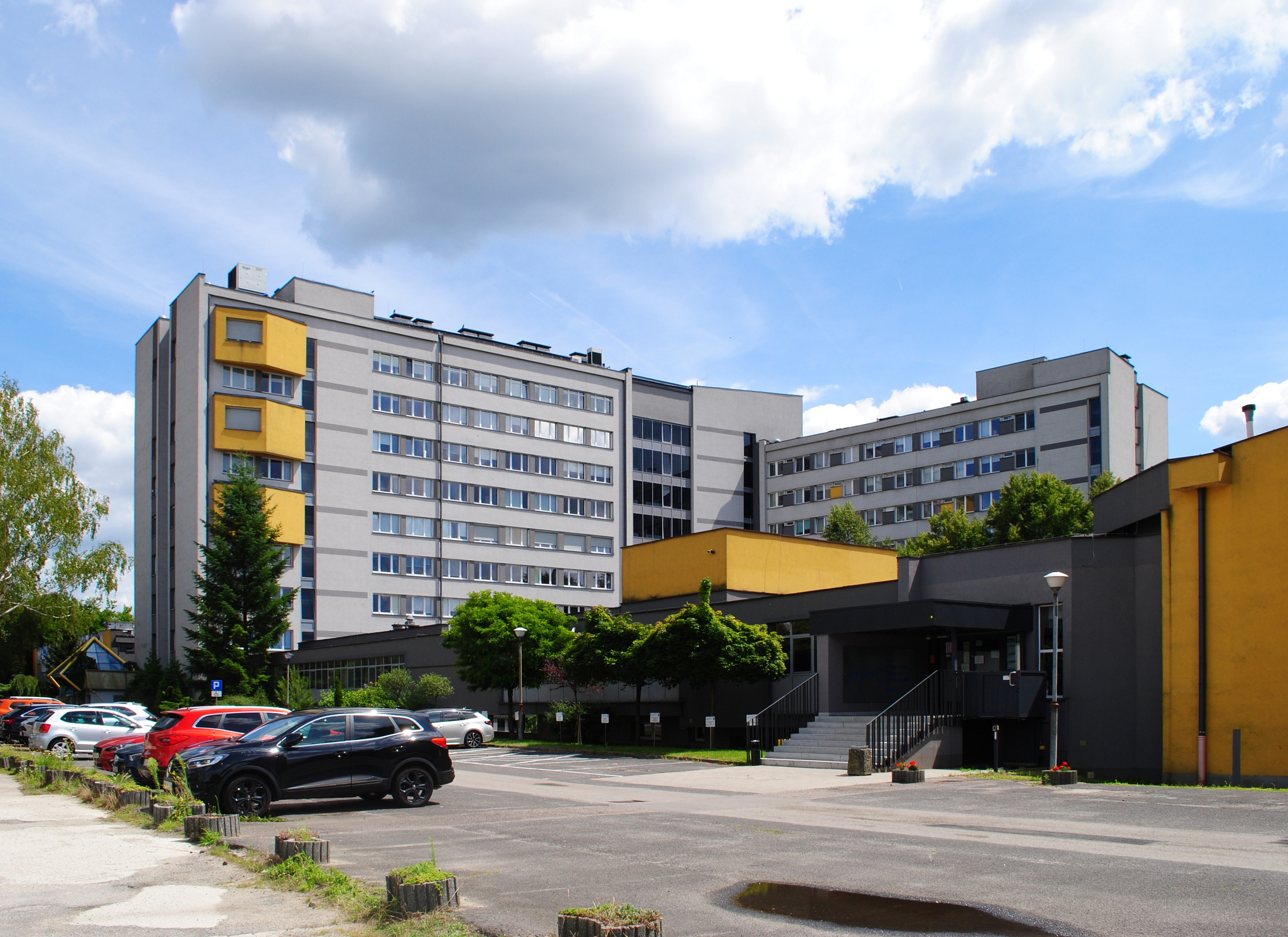
Kornel Gibiński University Clinical Center of the Medical University of Silesia (14 Medyków Street)

In terms of crime rates, Ligota-Panewniki is one of the safer districts in Katowice. In 2007, there were 2.21 crimes per 100 residents (the average for Katowice as a whole at that time was 3.08 crimes). In 2013, there were 530 crimes in Ligota-Panewniki, which translates to 1.7 crimes per 100 residents of the district. Of these, 7 were robberies, and 27 were acts of hooliganism. In a 2011 survey, 70.7% of Ligota-Panewniki residents surveyed stated that they felt safe in their district, 26.7% disagreed, and 2.6% found it difficult to assess this situation.

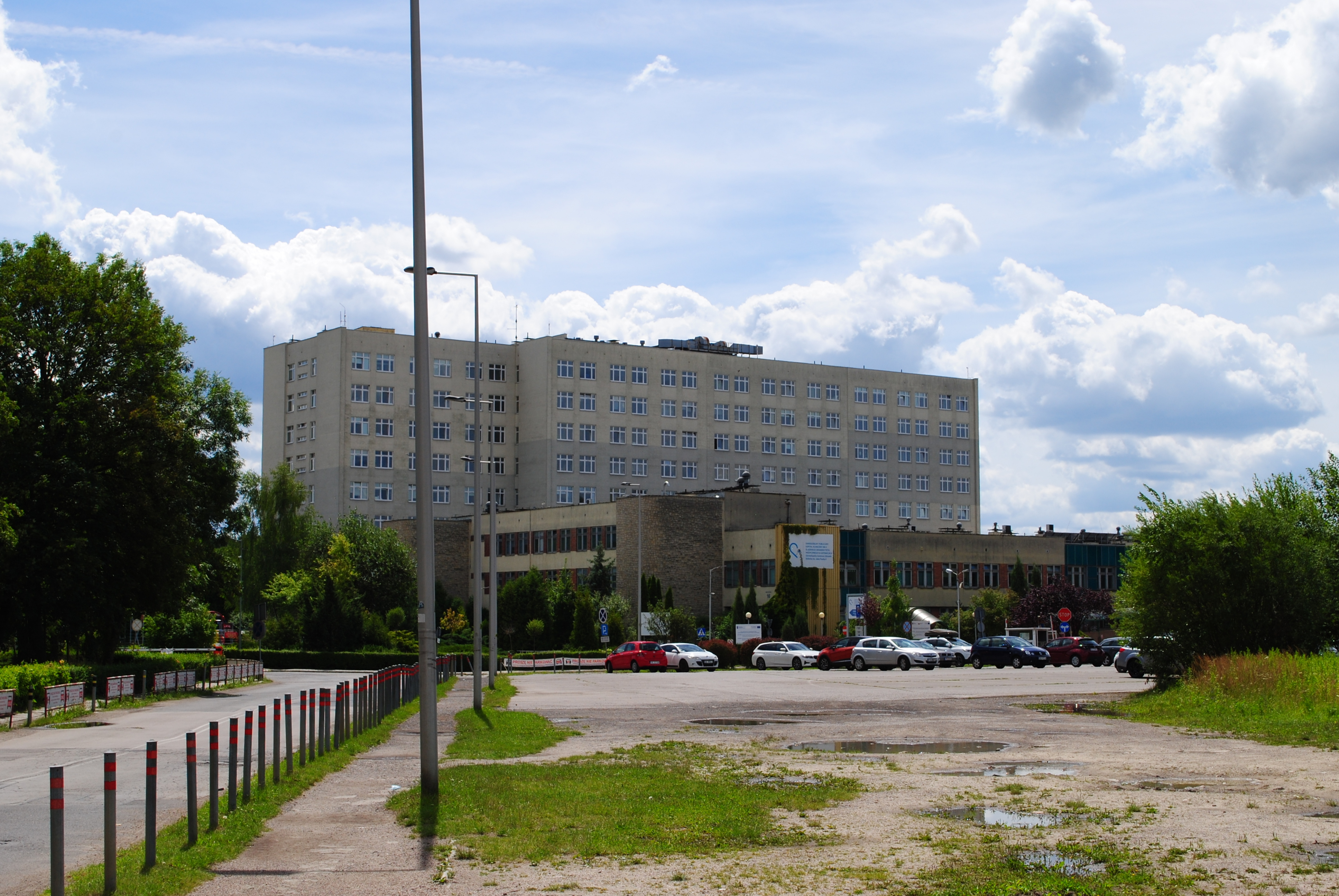
Upper Silesian Children's Health Center of the Medical University of Silesia (16 Medyków Street)

The 3rd Precinct of the Katowice Municipal Police Headquarters is located at 20 Książęca Street in Ligota-Panewniki. Part of the city's municipal monitoring system, managed by the Crisis Management Department of the Katowice City Hall, also operates there. The district is home to the city's surveillance monitoring center.

There are several medical facilities in Ligota-Panewniki:

- Hospitals of the Medical University of Silesia – Kornel Gibiński University Clinical Center (one of two facilities; 14 Medyków Street) and Upper Silesian Children's Health Center (16 Medyków Street);
- Hospitals of Silesian Voivodeship – Regional Railway Hospital (65 Panewnicka Street).

The decision to build the Kornel Gibiński Central Clinical Hospital was made by the Council of Ministers on 1 January 1960. In October 1966, a ceremony was held to lay the cornerstone for the construction of the main clinical complex, and the first patient was admitted to the new hospital on 19 August 1974.

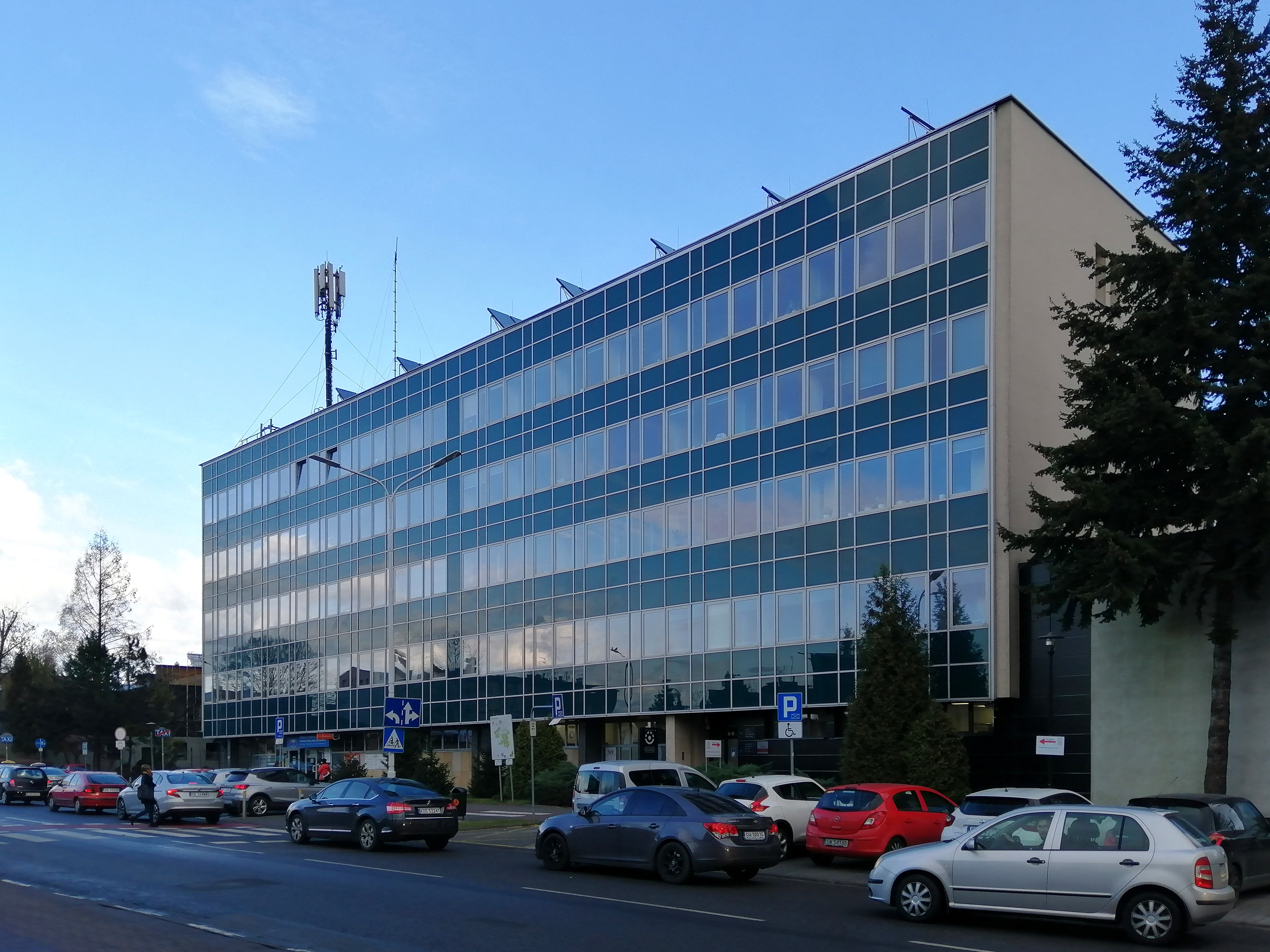
Regional Railway Hospital (65 Panewnicka Street)

The first director of the Central Clinical Hospital was Dr. Zbigniew Walenty Kalina, who took office on 1 January 1974. In 2010, the Kornel Gibiński Central Clinical Hospital consisted of 13 hospital wards and an outpatient clinic with 22 consultation rooms; during that time, approximately 12,000 patients were hospitalized there, and over 40,000 consultations were provided in the specialized outpatient clinics. In 2016, this hospital was merged with the University Center of Ophthalmology and Oncology into a single facility – the K. Gibiński University Clinical Center of the Medical University of Silesia.

In 1965, a new health center was opened on Piotrowicka Street, in the unfinished part of the provincial house of the Sisters Servants of the Blessed Virgin Mary. In 1970 (or 1969), a railway hospital was put into service, and in 1982 it was expanded with a new building on Medyków Street. By order of the Katowice voivode of 31 December 1992, the Voivodeship Emergency Medical Service Station was established, and its structure included, among others, a substation in Ligota.

At the end of 1996 – 22 years after the programmatic, technical, and economic plans were approved – Hospital No. 6, the Upper Silesian Children's Health Center, was established. It was opened on 29 May 1999. It is one of the largest children's hospitals in Poland. In 2007, the hospital admitted 16,342 patients.

At 35a Świdnicka Street in Ligota-Panewniki, there is a branch of Local Social Welfare Center No. 7, a Shelter for the Homeless, and a Social Welfare Home. The Local Social Welfare Center serves Ligota, Panewniki, and Brynów.

== Culture ==
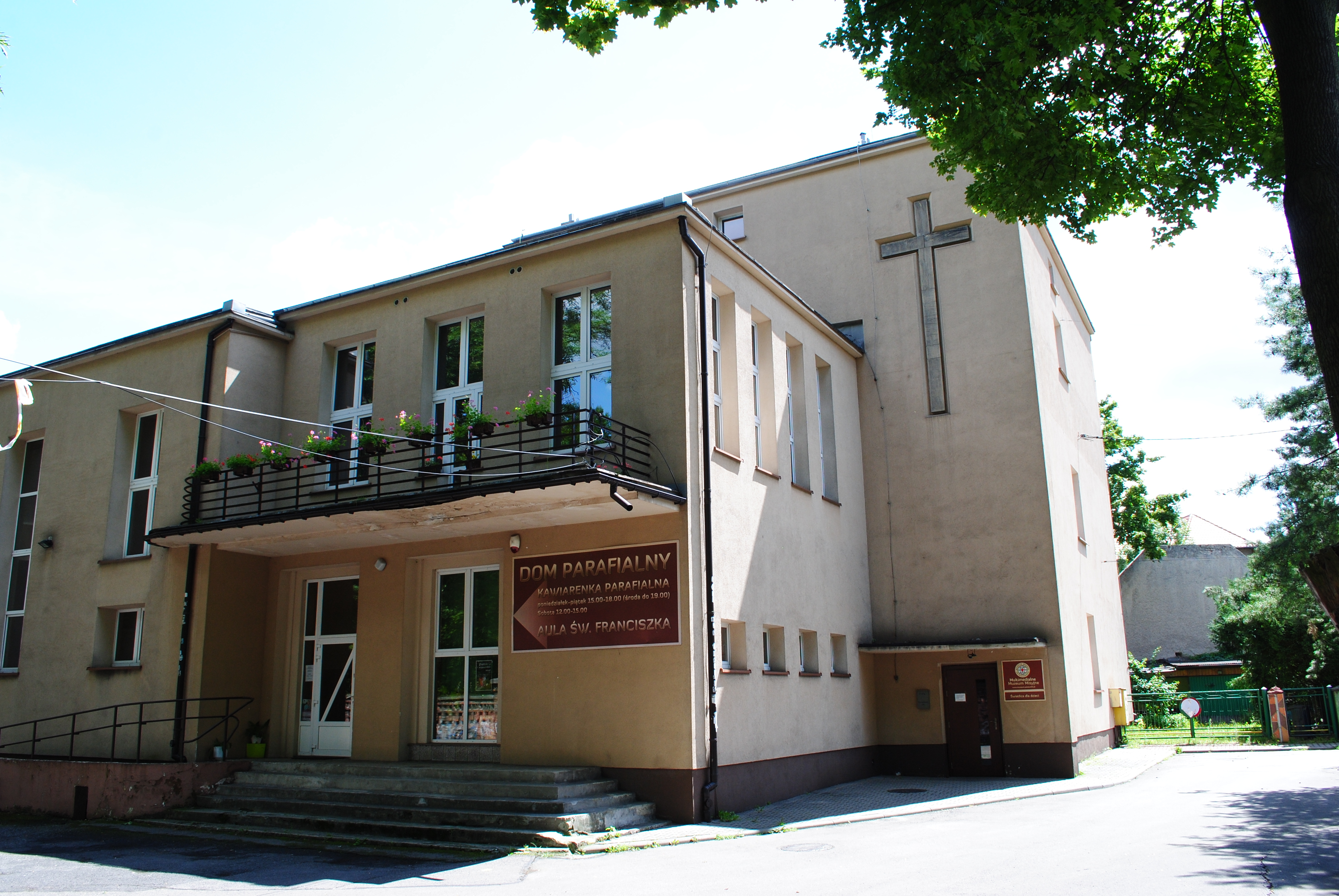
Community House at 20 Związkowa Street, built in 1935 – one of the centers of cultural activity in Panewniki during the interwar period

The beginnings of cultural activity in Ligota-Panewniki date back to the second half of the 19th century. In 1881, a library of the People's Libraries Society was established in Kokociniec – one of the first in Upper Silesia. Zadole later became the site of the first meeting of Silesian singing groups, which took place on 19 September 1909, and on 8 October 1911, the First Congress of Choirs of the Union of Silesian Singing Circles was held there. From that time until the end of the 20th century, Zadole served as a regular venue for singing conventions as well as concerts by choirs and orchestras. In 1910, the Lutnia Choir was founded in Ligota – initially named after S. Wyspiański, and later after P. Maszyński. It remained active until 1954.

Cultural traditions in Ligota-Panewniki flourished during the interwar period. In 1923, the Wanda Choir was founded in Panewniki; in addition to choral performances, it frequently organized amateur theatrical productions. In 1935, the Franciscan friars, with the assistance of the management of the Pokój Iron Works, the Hohenlohé company, and the Saturn and Grodziec cement works, built the Community House. Numerous lectures, evening gatherings, and meetings were held there.

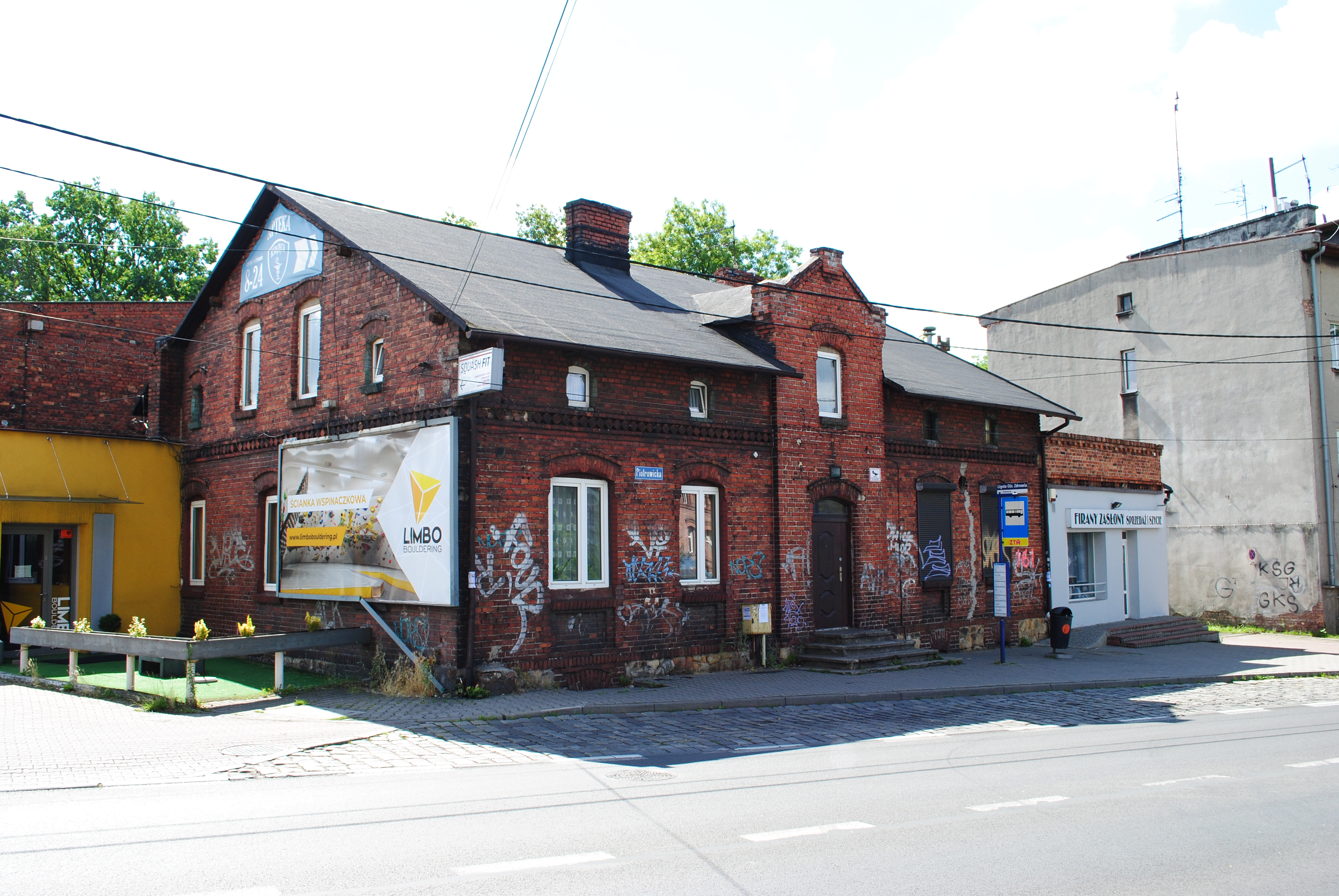
Building that once housed the S. Mandecki restaurant and later the J. Jeselli restaurant at 90 Piotrowicka Street; it has been home to the Bajka Cinema since the 1950s

During the interwar period, a library run by the People's Libraries Society operated in Ligota. In 1935, the Ligota branch held 1,330 volumes, which were used by 346 readers at the time. During the Polish People's Republic, the PEMUG Works Cultural Committee operated for a short time, occupying the premises of the former Hildebrandt restaurant. In the 1950s (or during the interwar period), the Bajka Cinema, which no longer exists today, was built. The cinema was established in the building of the former restaurant owned by Stanisław Mandecki, and later by J. Jeselli, at 90 Piotrowicka Street.

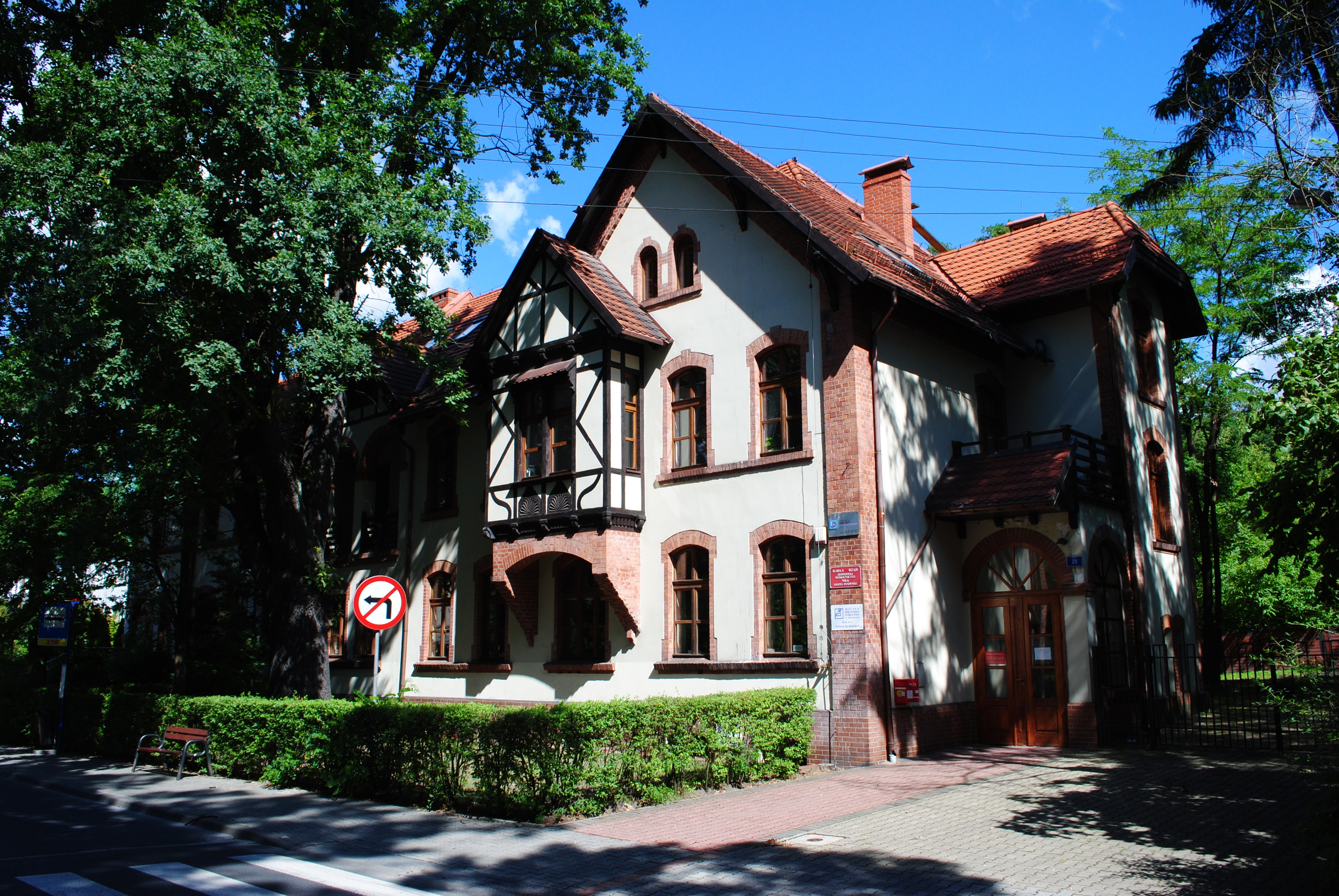
Seat of Branch No. 7 of the Katowice Municipal Public Library (25 Franciszkańska Street)

Since 1972, Branch No. 7 of the Katowice Municipal Public Library was located in the former Panewniki Town Hall at 75 Panewnicka Street; it was later moved to 25 Franciszkańska Street. It has been located at its current address since 18 February 2000. In addition, as of early 2023, other branches of the Katowice Municipal Public Library were also operating in Ligota-Panewniki: no. 5 (2 Braci Mniejszych Street), no. 18 (16 Studencka Street), no. 34 (14 Medyków Street), and no. 38 (16 Medyków Street).

In 1982, Elżbieta Jasiok, who headed one of the Community Music Centers, secured the premises at 33 Franciszkańska Street, now home to the Ligota Municipal Cultural Center, to serve as the center's headquarters and a branch of the Katowice Municipal Public Library. A year later, the Municipal Cultural Center was established there, and from 1982 to 1987, it operated as a branch of the Koszutka Municipal Cultural Center. Between 1991 and 1993, the building underwent a major renovation, and new rooms were added on the west side.

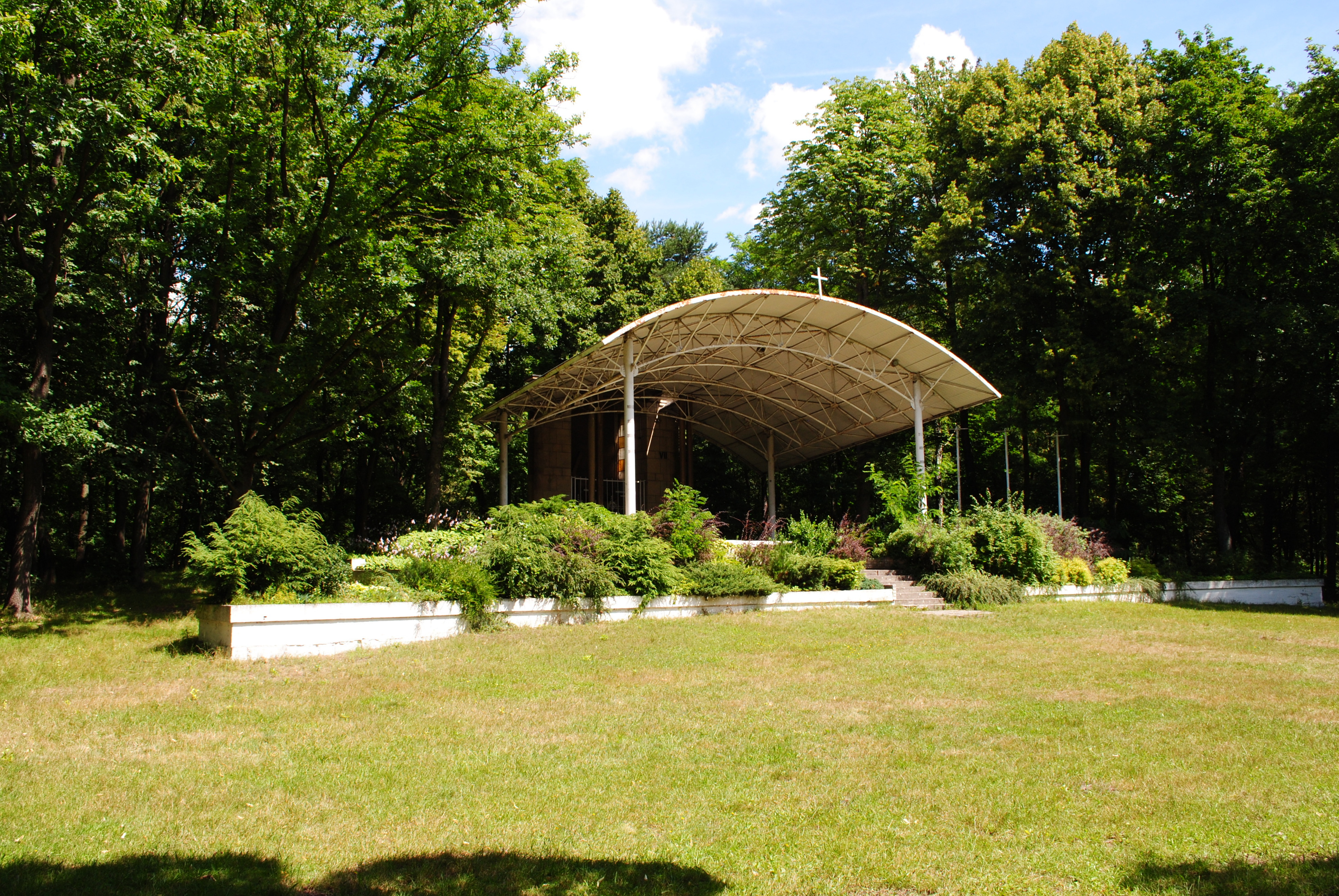
VII Station of the Way of the Cross at Kalwaria Panewnicka – venue of the Ekosong Environmental Song Festival

Between 1986 and 1991, the GuGalander Theatre operated at the Ligota Municipal Cultural Center. Kabaret Mumio and Gry i Ludzie Theatre trace their origins to this theater. Since 1995, the Ligota Municipal Cultural Center has organized the Festival of Blooming Hawthorns every May – a recurring outdoor event with artistic performances, as well as parades of marching bands, street theater, and stage performances. The event takes place at the amphitheater in Zadole.

Between 1990 and 2003 and between 2008 and 2019, the district hosted the Ekosong Environmental Song Festival. It was held annually at Kalwaria Panewnicka in front of the Seventh Station of the Cross by the Franciscans of the Province of the Assumption of Mary of the Order of Friars Minor. Over the course of its history, the Ekosong festival has featured a number of well-known Polish artists and bands, including Stare Dobre Małżeństwo, De Mono, Skaldowie, Voo Voo, Ewa Bem, Andrzej Piaseczny, Lombard, Brathanki, Czerwone Gitary, and Krzysztof Krawczyk.

Student Radio Egida is located in Student Dormitory No. 1 at 15 Studencka Street. It is one of the cultural departments of the University of Silesia. The station began broadcasting on 21 November 1969, gradually expanding its coverage to include additional dormitories in Osiedle Akademickie of the University of Silesia. The station mainly airs original programming covering various cultural fields, while also collaborating with other cultural institutions and publishers.

== Religion ==
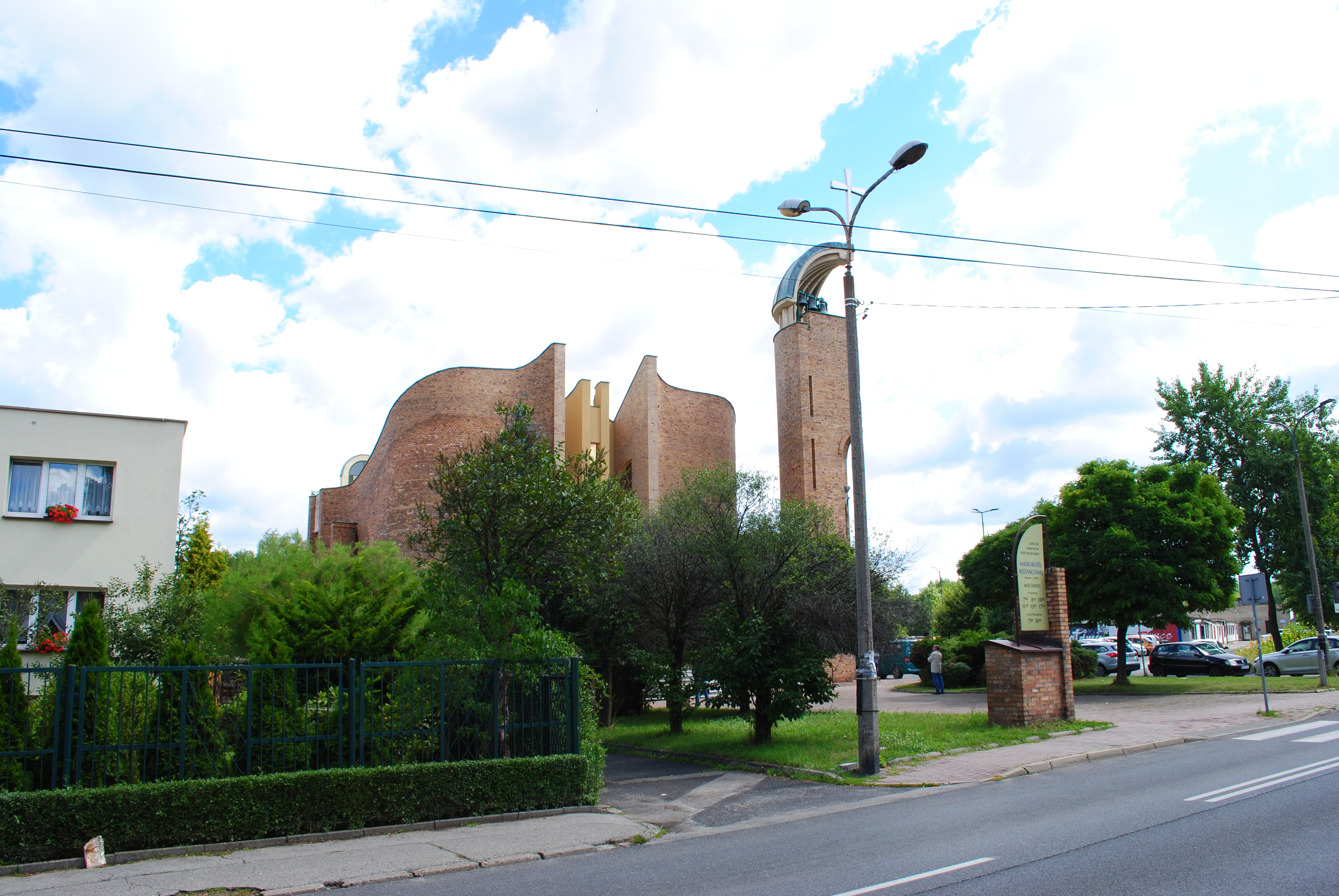
Church of the Parish of Our Lady of the Rosary (Zadole Street)

The following religious communities are based in Ligota-Panewniki:

- Buddhist Kwan Um School of Zen – Katowice Zen Center (22 Zagroda Street);
- Roman Catholic Parish of Our Lady of the Rosary (36 Zadole Street);
- Roman Catholic Parish of St. Anthony of Padua (451 Panewnicka Street);
- Roman Catholic Parish of St. Louis the King and the Assumption of Mary (76 Panewnicka Street).

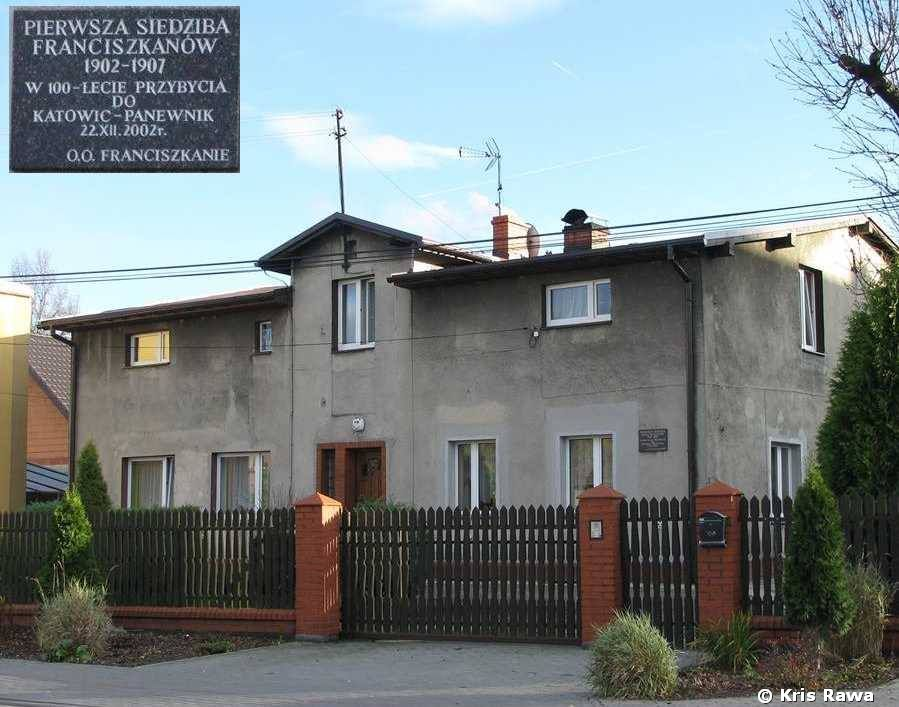
First seat of the Franciscan friars in Stare Panewniki (439 Panewnicka Street)

The largest religious community in the district is the Roman Catholic Church; originally, Roman Catholic parishioners from Ligota-Panewniki belonged to the Parish of St. Adalbert in Mikołów, which was formerly part of the Diocese of Kraków and had been part of the Pszczyna deanery since the mid-14th century. The parish of St. Adalbert in Mikołów, established in 1222, encompassed, among others, the areas of Podlesie, Piotrowice, Panewniki, Ligota, and Zarzecze. With the development of industry in Katowice during the 19th century, Protestants and Jews also began settling there. In 1840, 13 Protestants lived in Panewniki – the largest number among all the present-day southern parts of Katowice. At that time, few Jews settled in the southern districts, and there were none at all in Ligota.

Father Teofil Bromboszcz, who would later become a social activist and suffragan bishop of the Diocese of Katowice, was born in Ligota in 1881.

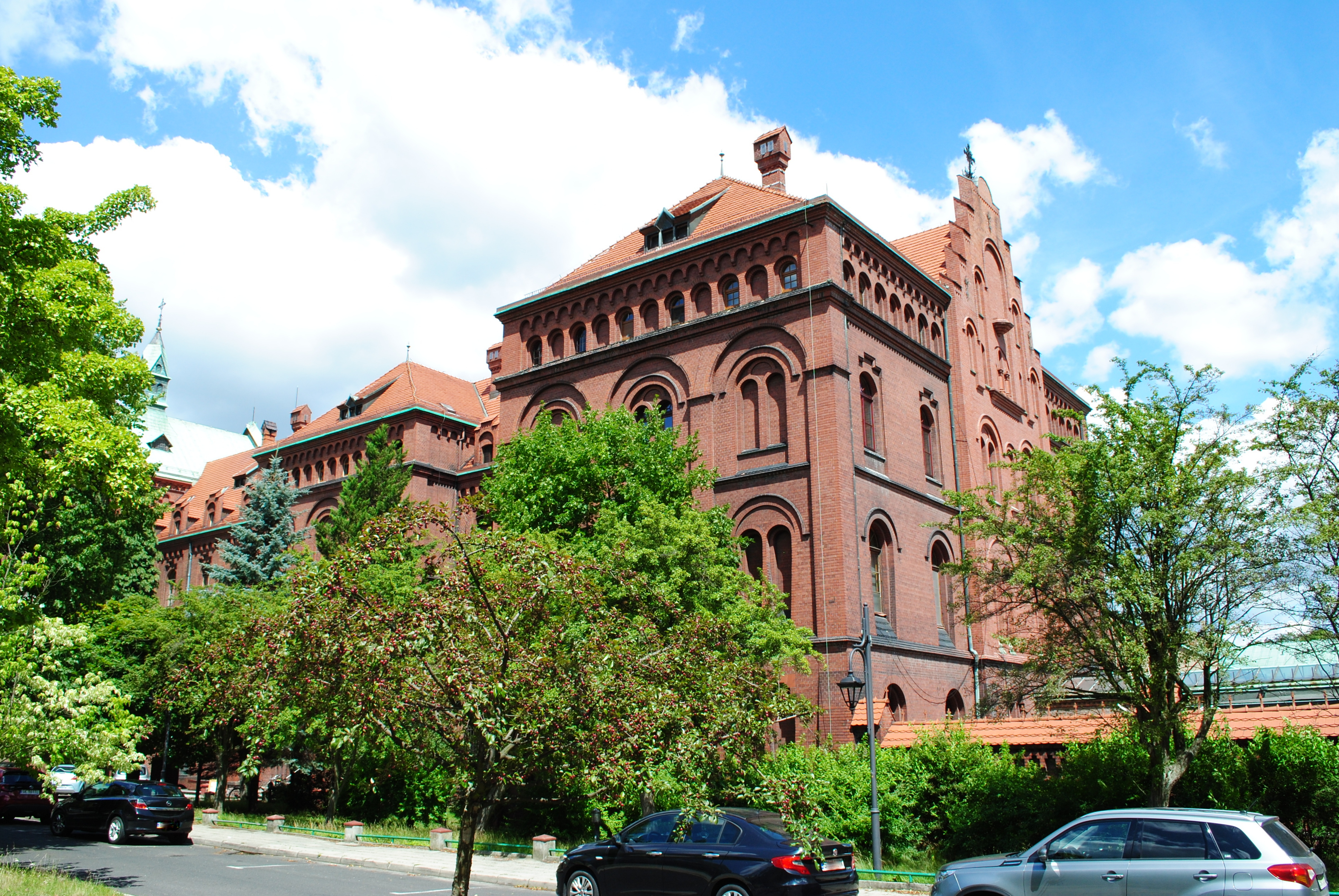
Franciscan monastery in Panewniki (76 Panewnicka Street)

The first Franciscan friars arrived in Panewniki in 1902. This was initiated by the parson of Bogucice, Father Ludwik Skowronek, who partially covered the costs of purchasing the land for the church and monastery. The first friars were Fathers Kamil Bolczyk and Wilhelm Rogosz. They were housed in a residential building that was converted into a temporary monastery, established on 22 December 1902. Between 1904 and 1905, the Lourdes Grotto was built on the site of present-day Kalwaria Panewnicka; construction of the monastery and church began in October 1905 according to a design by Mansuetus Fromm. The Franciscan monks moved into the new monastery building in September 1907, and the new church was consecrated in 1908. That same year, the annual tradition of building the Panewniki nativity scene began.

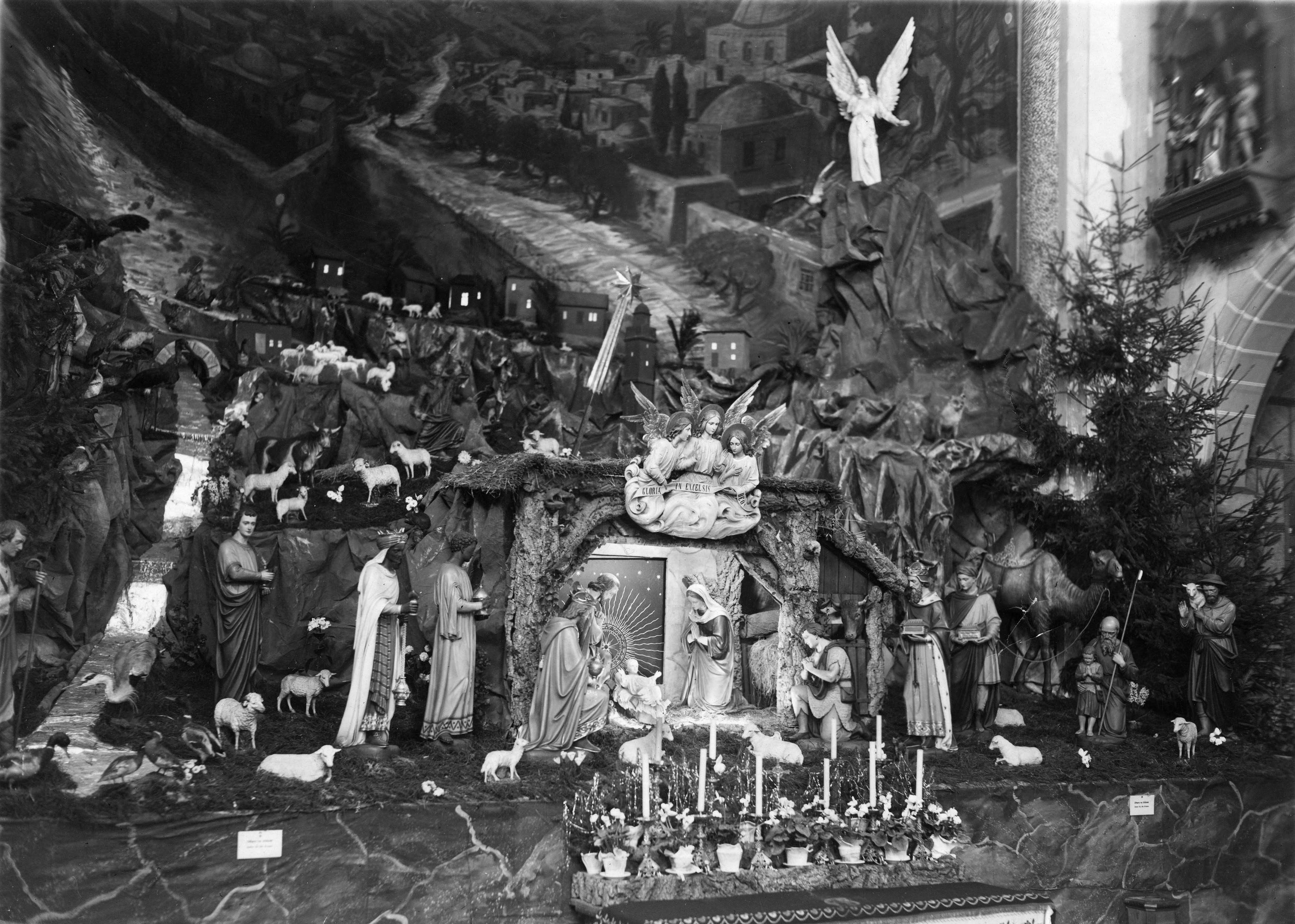
Panewniki nativity scene displayed in the basilica at the turn of 1933 and 1934

In 1914, the Franciscans took over pastoral care in Ligota, Panewniki, Piotrowice, and Kostuchna without establishing a separate parish. The curacy was created on 1 September 1933, and on 12 February 1934, it was elevated to the status of a parish. On 17 March 1923, the Panewniki house was incorporated into the Province of the Immaculate Conception of Mary, and at that time, it became the residence of the provincial superior. From 1921 to 1929, a Seraphic college was located there, and in 1932, a novitiate and a printing press were established. Between 1934 and 1935, the parish Community House was built. Construction on the Kalwaria Panewnicka chapels began in 1937, and was completed after World War II; between 1955 and 1963, the Rosary chapels were built.

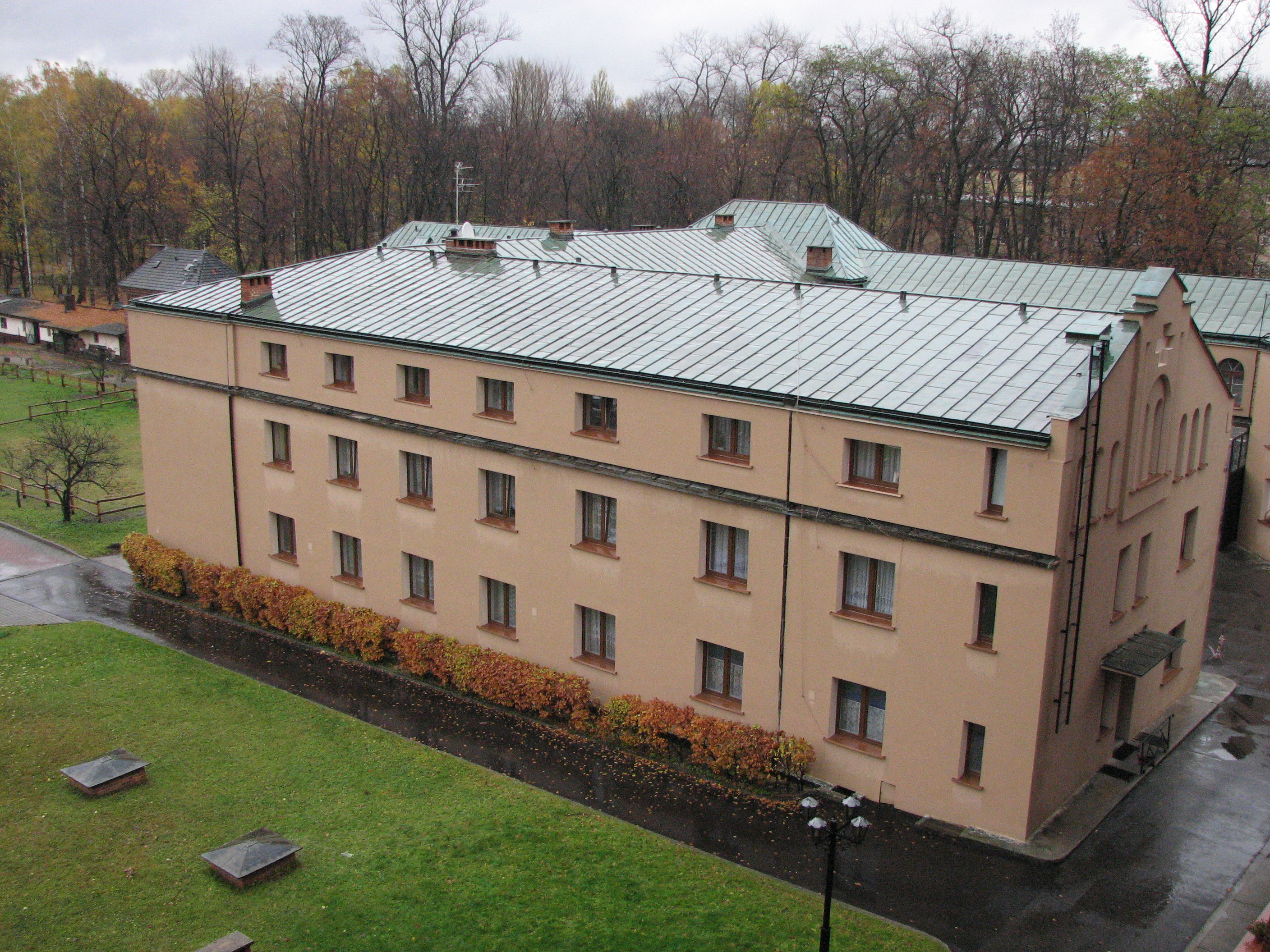
Former seminary of the Franciscans (76 Panewnicka Street)

During World War II, in October 1939, part of the Community House was seized and converted into Nazi Party offices, and in September and October 1940, the German occupiers confiscated the Community House and the monastery to accommodate displaced people from Bessarabia and Bukovina, and only a few priests were allowed to remain there and work in the Panewniki parish. They returned to the monastery in 1945.

After World War II, the Panewniki monastery became a center for the education of religious candidates for the priesthood. From 1949 to 1970, a Theological College operated there, and from 1970 to 2025, a Higher Seminary. The St. Bonaventure's Franciscan Theological Seminary was located at 76 Panewnicka Street. The building housed a clerical residence with living quarters and lecture halls, and until 2017, seminary students published, among other things, the quarterly journal Śladami Patriarchy.

On 13 May 1955, the Katowice-Południe deanery was established; it was renamed the Katowice-Panewniki deanery on 1 January 1998. It includes, among others, all Catholic parish communities in Ligota-Panewniki.

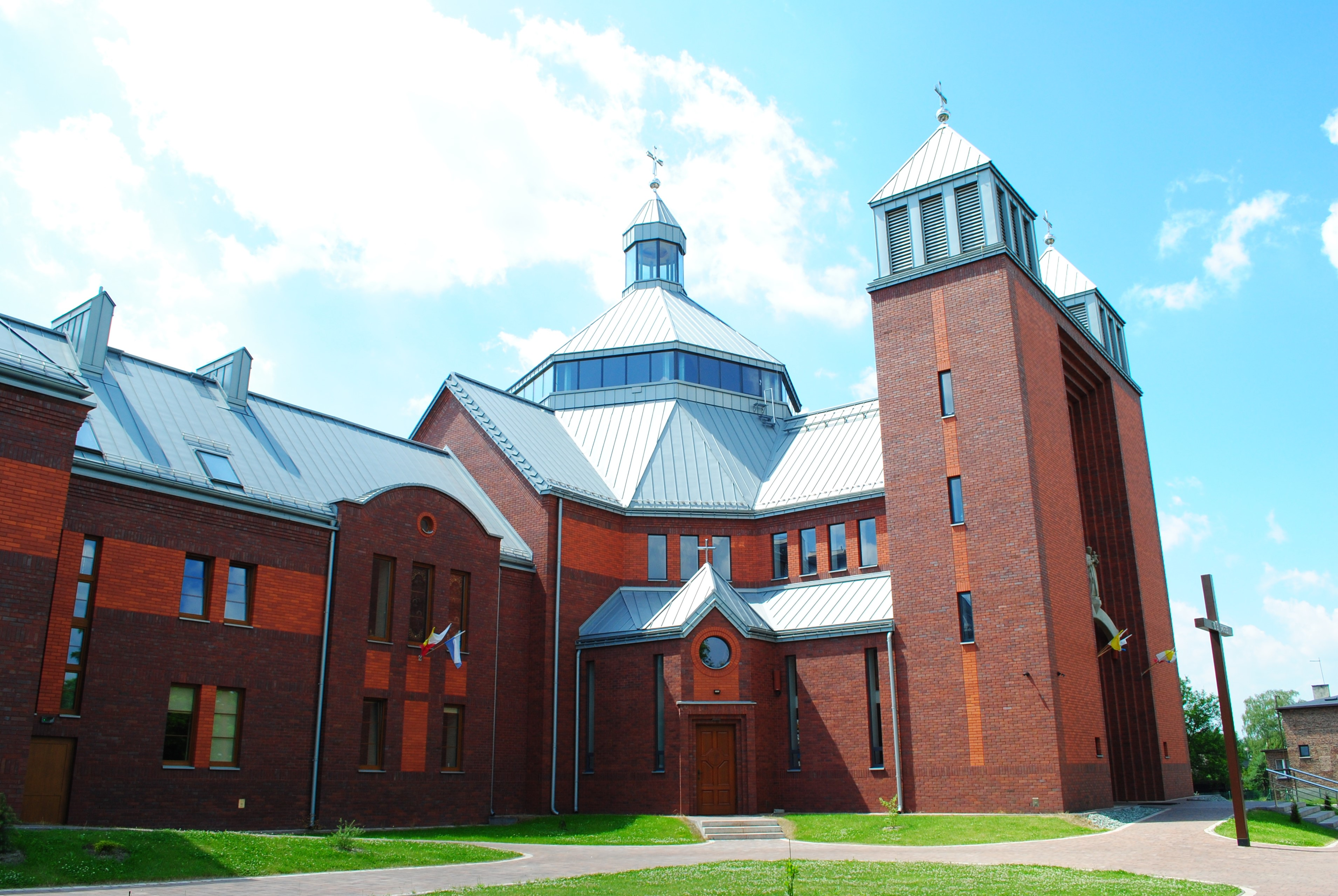
Church of the Parish of St. Anthony (451 Panewnicka Street)

On 23 February 1958, a Franciscan chapel dedicated to St. Anthony was opened in Stare Panewniki, in the building of the former Valeska Schwertfeger restaurant at present-day 463 Panewnicka Street. The furnishings were moved from the chapel of the Marianówka nursing home. Between 1965 and 1968, the former dance hall was converted into the church nave; the religious house was established in 1980, and on 22 March 1981, a new Roman Catholic parish was established by separating it from the Parish of St. Louis the King and the Assumption of Mary. In 1966, the Franciscan Center for Academic Ministry was created. In 1974, the Church of St. Louis the King in Panewniki was elevated to the rank of minor basilica. In 2012, the Franciscan monastery in Panewniki was home to 34 friars, 33 seminary students, and 14 brothers.

On 4 June 2023, Archbishop Wiktor Skworc solemnly consecrated the new church of the Stare Panewniki parish, which replaced the previous building.

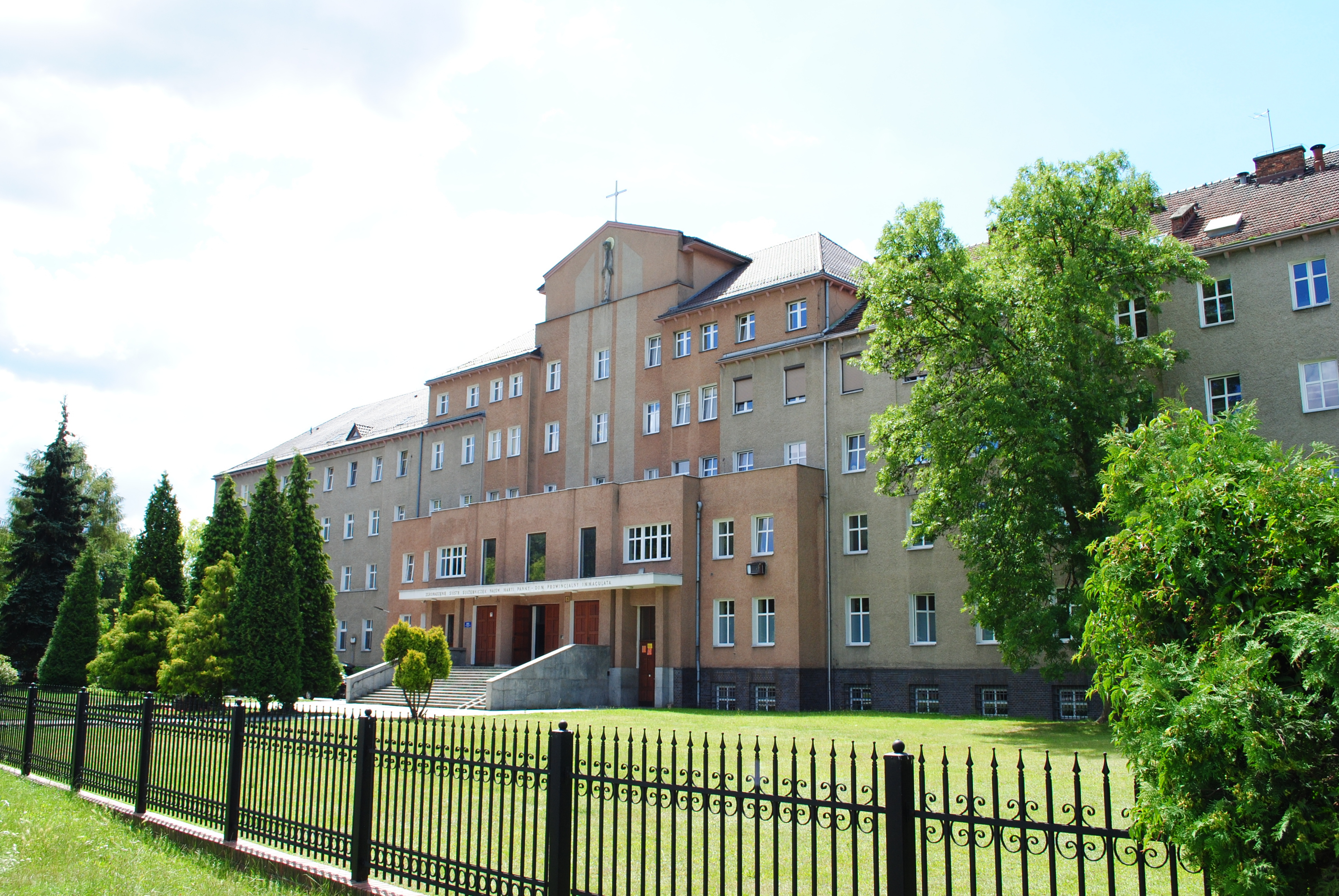
Seat of the Katowice Province of the Congregation of the Sisters of the Servants (63 Panewnicka Street)

Within the original Piotrowice Parish of the Sacred Heart of Jesus and St. John Bosco, the Church of Our Lady of the Rosary was built in Zadole between 1985 and 1992. The Parish of Our Lady of the Rosary itself was established on 19 August 1984, and was separated from the parishes of St. Hyacinth in Ochojec, St. Louis the King in Panewniki, and the Sacred Heart of Jesus in Piotrowice. It was created mainly for the residents of the housing estates built in the area of Zadole and Gdańska streets in the 1970s, as well as the part of Nowa Ligota near Słupska Street. The faithful from this part of Ligota initially attended the parish in Panewniki, but the pastoral needs were too great, and the establishment of a new parish became a necessity.

The Katowice Province of the Congregation of the Sisters of the Servants is located at 63 Panewnicka Street. The provincial house serves as a candidate house, postulancy, and second-year novitiate, and the Sisters of the Servants function as catechists and nurses at the Regional Railway Hospital, provide outpatient care for the sick, and also conduct catechesis and operate a soup kitchen for the poor. The convent also houses a Edmund Bojanowski Private Kindergarten and the Retreat House of the Archdiocese of Katowice. In 2006, 47 sisters lived in the Provincial House, while 36 retired sisters lived in St. Anne's House at 84 Panewnicka Street, some of whom were working at the hospital at the time.

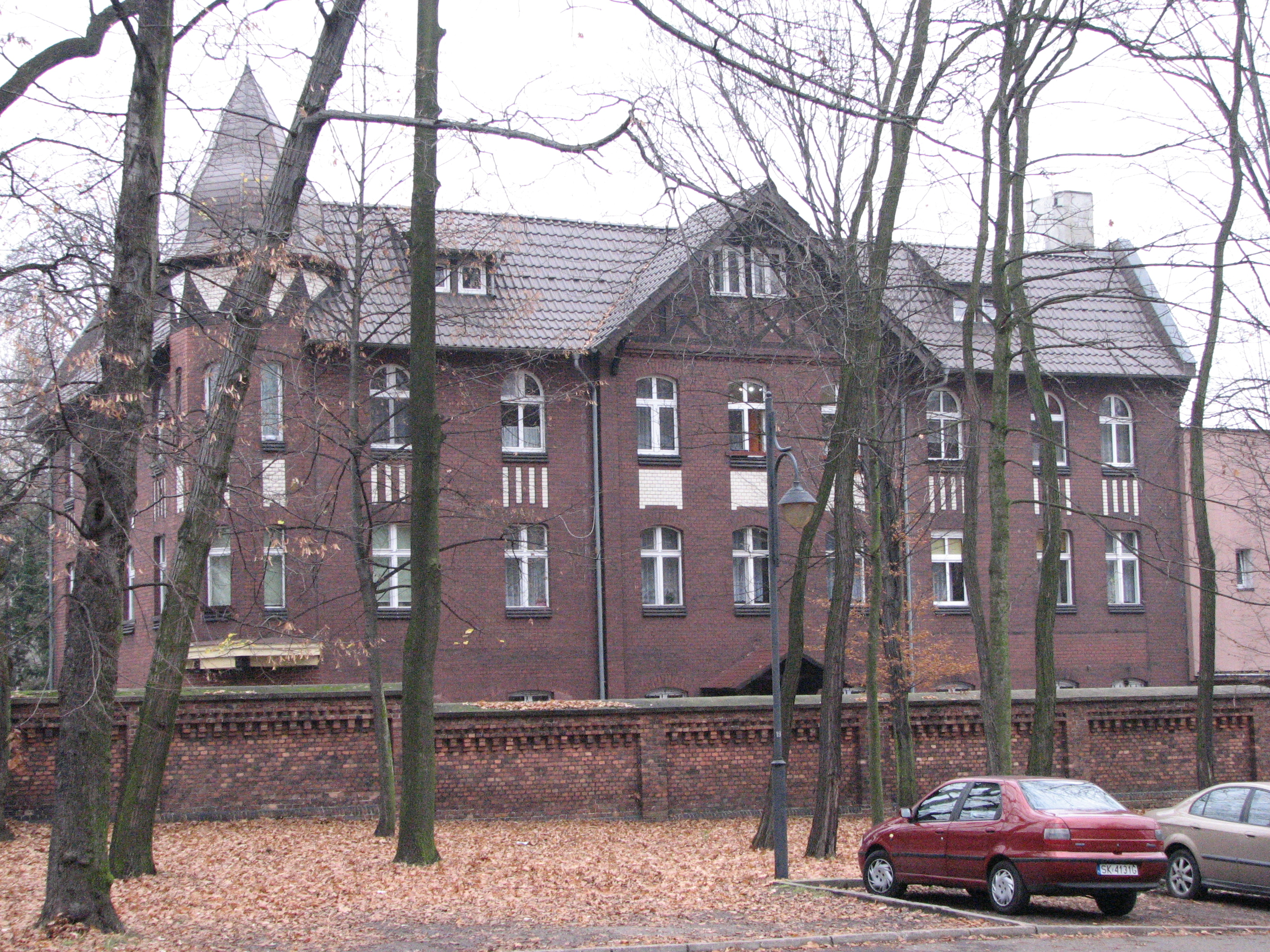
St. Anna House

In 1912, the Sisters of the Servants from the mother house in Poręba purchased a single-story house with an attic at present-day 73 Panewnicka Street from Johanna Lippa; they had been living there since 26 September 1909. In 1921, they moved to a larger house at today's 84 Panewnicka Street – the House of St. Francis – and rented out their previous residence to lay tenants. By a resolution of the General Council in Leśnica of 27 June 1923, approved on 4 July of the same year, the provincial headquarters (Polish-Silesian since 1928) of the Sisters of the Servants was established. Sister M. Zofia Pawleta became the first superior. On 8 May 1925, a semi-public chapel was established in the convent, and on 29 April 1946, a second chapel intended for professed sisters.

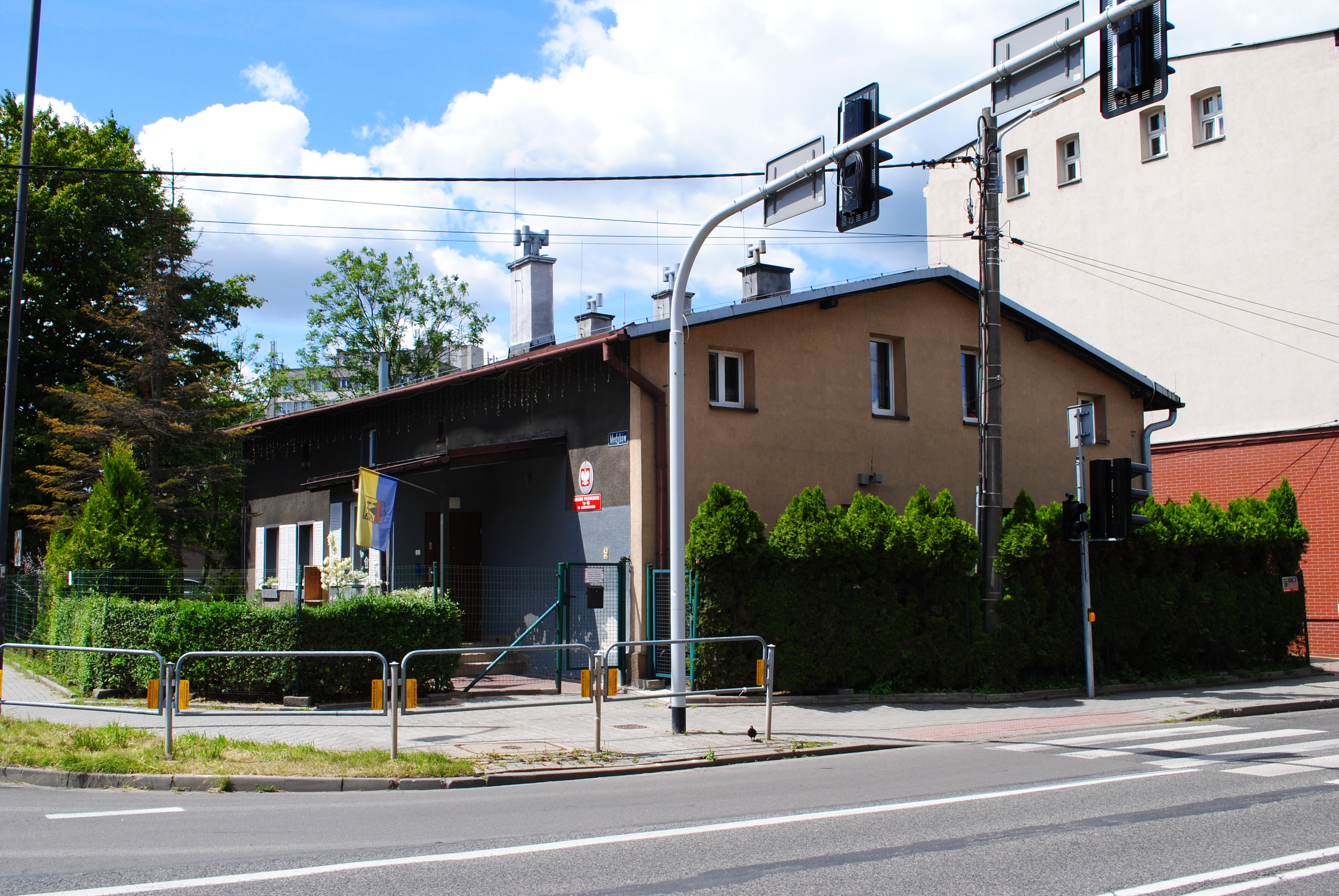
Building at 73 Panewnicka Street – the first Panewniki seat of the Sisters of the Servants, purchased in 1912; now the building of Municipal Kindergarten No. 40

On 17 August 1934, the sisters began construction of a new Provincial House at present-day 63 Panewnicka Street; the cornerstone was laid on 14 May 1936. In 1939, 54 sisters were living there. After the new Provincial House opened, the former convent housed St. Anne's Facility, intended for sick sisters. On 18 October 1940, the newly constructed building was seized by the authorities for secular purposes, and in 1943 it was confiscated by the Gestapo for the benefit of the German Reich. In 1941, the oldest convent building was also confiscated and converted into a kindergarten (the building served the same function after the war as well).

In 1949, the novitiate was moved to a new building, where one wing had been completed at that time. In 1950, the authorities ordered work to be halted, and on 3 May of that year, they seized the western part of the building. On 29 December 1951, a state commission seized the building for use as a hospital. Following the October 1956 reforms, on 17 November of that year, the building was returned to the Sisters Servants.

Since 18 December 2003, a house of the Sisters of the Divine Savior has been in operation at 6 Karol Bik Street. At that time, four sisters from the motherhouse in Goczałkowice-Zdrój moved in. On 5 September 2005, a chapel dedicated to St. Joseph was consecrated there. In addition to their work at the hospital, the Sisters of the Divine Savior also staff the office of the Franciscan friars.

=== Cemeteries ===
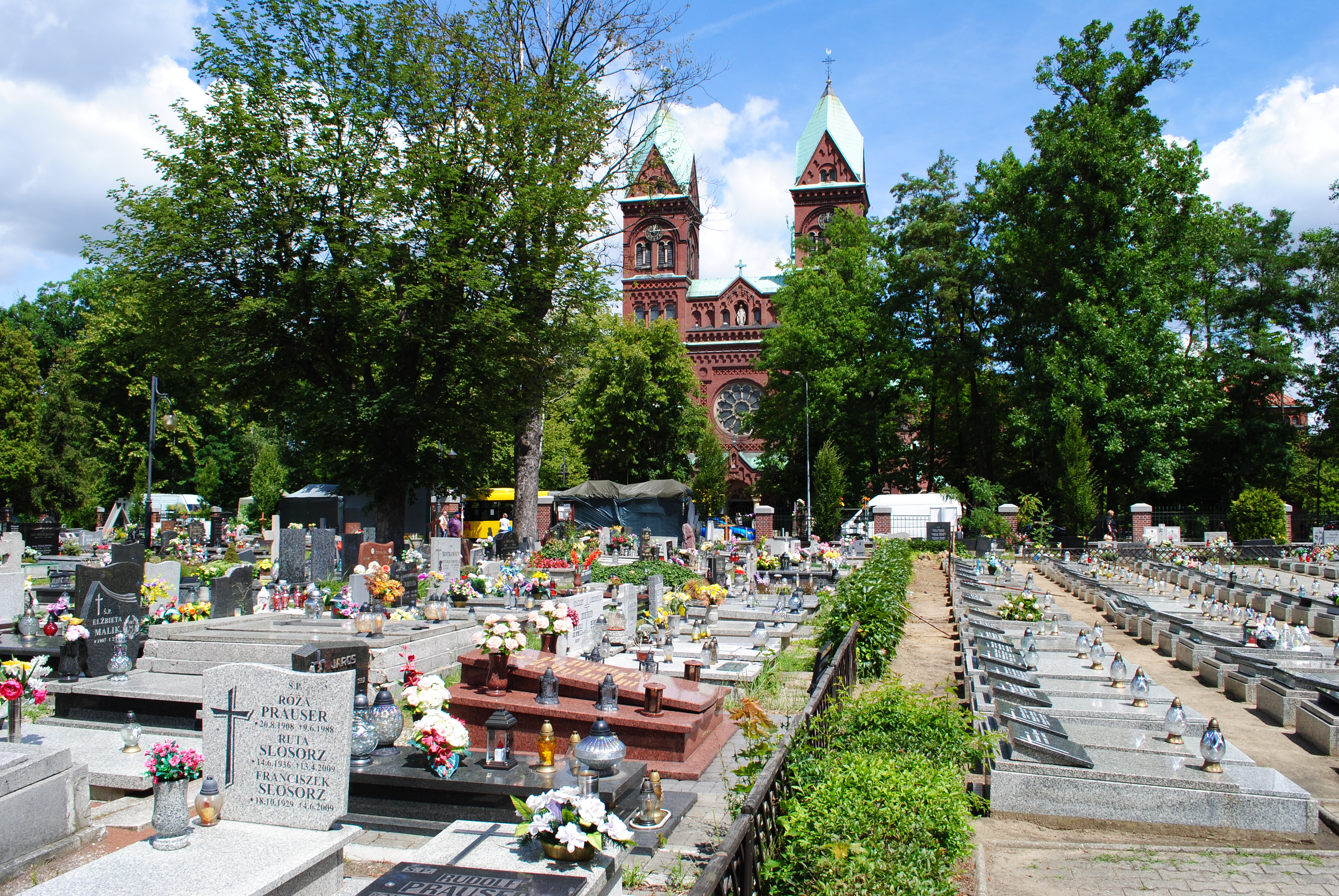
Panewniki municipal cemetery

The municipal cemetery is located at 45 Panewnicka Street – one of the largest (5.5 hectares) in Katowice, containing over 10,000 graves, including designated sections in the central part of the cemetery for the Franciscan friars and the Sisters of the Blessed Virgin Mary.

Plans for this cemetery were drawn up in 1913; the Franciscans were to establish it, but Oppeln did not approve. It was then decided that the gmina would establish its own cemetery. It was built across from the church. The founder and initiator of the cemetery was Nepomucen Wielebski, head of the gmina and district office in Ligota Pszczyńska.

Initially, the cemetery served exclusively for monks, but over time it also became a resting place for other believers. Bolesław Szabelski – composer and founder of the Silesian school of composers – is buried there.

== Sport and recreation ==
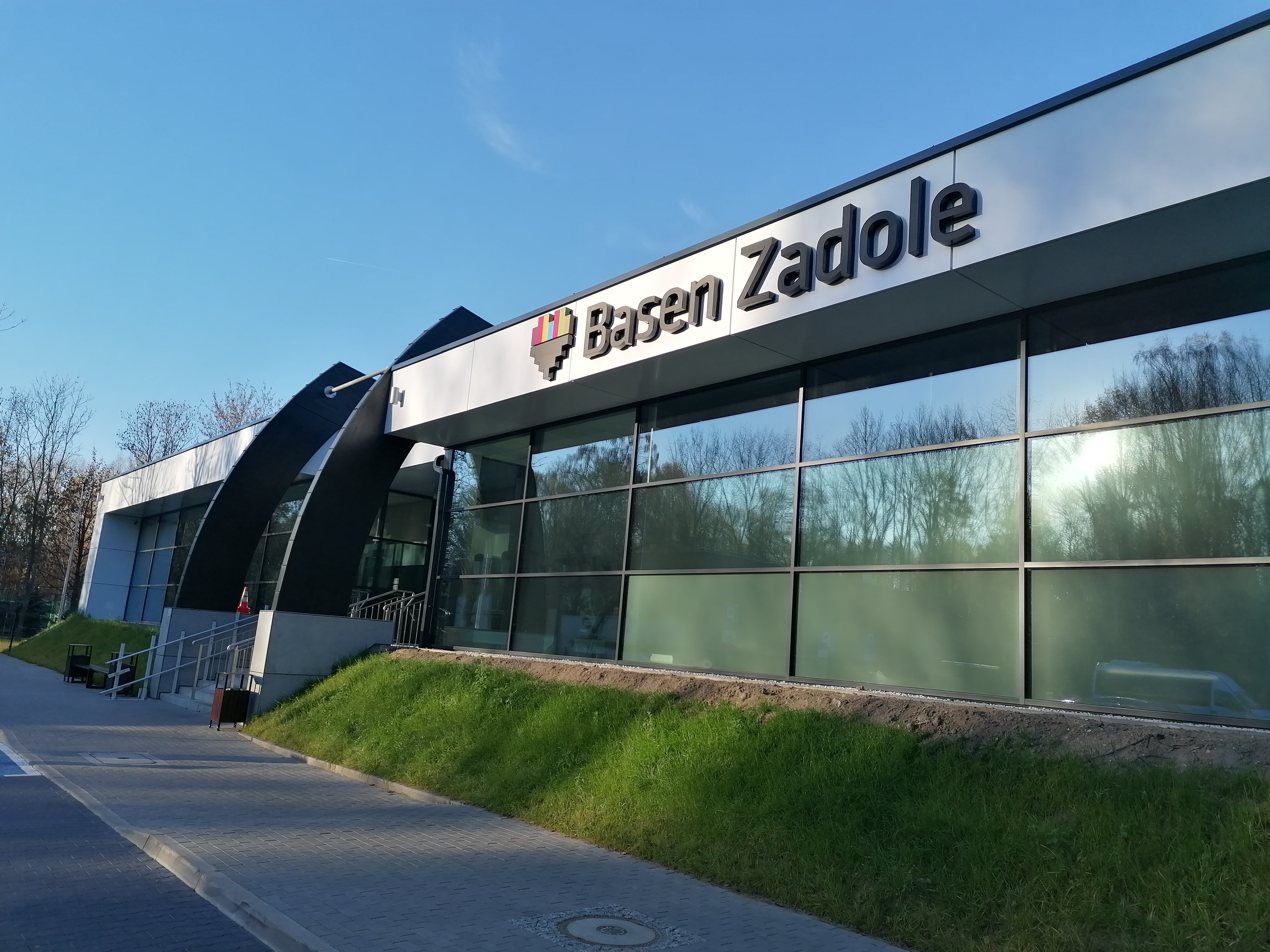
Zadole swimming pool (8a Wczasowa Street)

Sports and recreational activities in Ligota-Panewniki are supported by a number of facilities and locations, mainly the Panewniki Forests and Zadole Park, as well as family allotment gardens. The district is also home to many gyms and fitness clubs.

Cycling, hiking, and sightseeing trails run through the Panewniki Forests within the district's boundaries: the Heroes of the Parachute Tower Trail, the Żwakowski Trail, and the 25th Anniversary PTTK Trail, and since 2012, the Panewniki Wild Boar Run, organized by the Jerzy Kukuczka Academy of Physical Education, has been held in these forests.

The Zadole Recreation and Leisure Center is located in Zadole Park at 8 Wczasowa Street. Its facilities include tennis courts, a swimming pool, a skatepark, a multipurpose hall, a gym, changing rooms, and restrooms. It is managed by the Municipal Recreation and Sports Center.

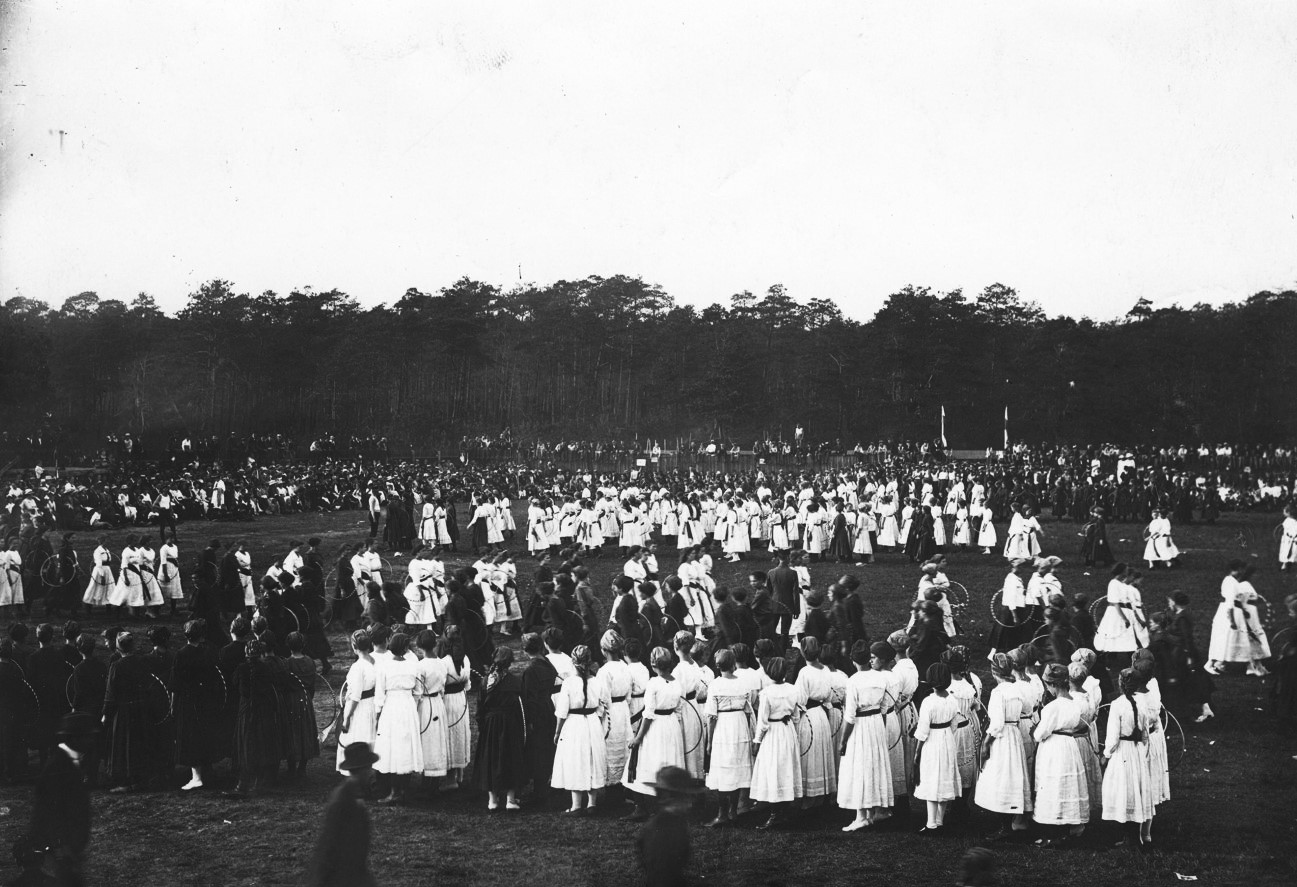
Gathering of members of the Sokół Gymnastic Society in Panewniki in 1919

The Volks- und Jungendspiele initiative marked the beginnings of organized sports activities in Ligota-Panewniki. In 1910, after the Duke of Pszczyna became its patron, the initiative developed in this area. In Ligota, it played a pioneering role in the formation of organized physical culture. The program of the Ligota Turn- und Sportverein movement included: palant, fistball, and tamburine.

Recreational activities began to develop in the early 20th century, when so-called "public bathing areas" began to appear along the Kłodnica river in Ligota and Panewniki. Among them was the area between Kijowska Street and the stretch between the Kłodnica river and the Kokociniec Stream, locally known as Kryminowa. Originally, it was a post-industrial site of the former Ida Iron Works, and from the early 20th century, it became a recreational area. In the 1970s, toboggan runs were built there. Tourism, meanwhile, emerged from the initiative of the German organization Beskienverien, based in Bielsko at the beginning of the 20th century, along with the first clubs in the area of present-day Katowice, including in Ligota. In 1912, a center for the Katowice and Upper Silesian Sokół Gymnastic Society began operating in Zadole. It was also the site of three regional gatherings that took place before the outbreak of World War I. After the war, the first Polish physical culture organizations were established in the present-day district. The Ligota branch of the Sokół Gymnastic Society was founded on 14 March 1920 on the initiative of Augustyn Świtała. In 1935, it had 62 members.

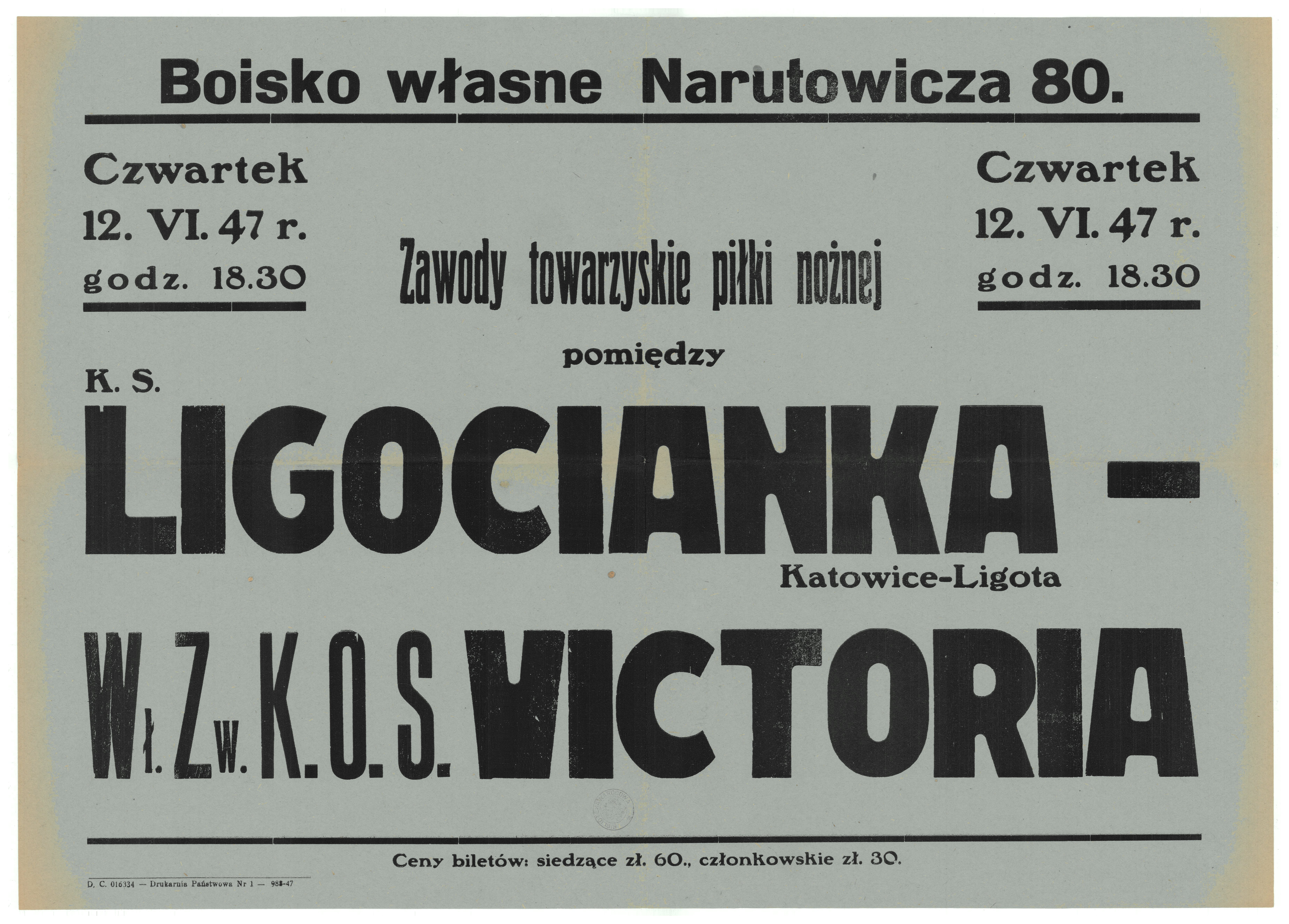
Poster of the friendly match of Victoria Częstochowa with Ligocianka Ligota from 12 June 1947

In 1924, the Ligocianka Ligota sports club was founded in Ligota and reactivated in 1945. The club had a playing field on Książęca Street and ran sections for soccer (in 1938, the club was promoted to the Silesian League), ice hockey, and theater. The first sports club founded in Panewniki was the First Panewniki Sports Society, established in 1925. Until 1939, this club operated exclusively a soccer section. In 1945, it was reactivated by Emmanuel Koczurowski. In the 1940s, it had 43 members. From 1950, the club competed as LZS Panewnik. Between 1922 and 1939, 8 sports organizations operated in Ligota, and 3 in Panewniki.

The Budowlani Ligota Sports Club was active from 1959 to 1964 (known as KS Elektrobudowa from 1956 to 1958) and is considered one of the successors to Ligocianka Ligota. In 1964, the club merged with Sparta Katowice. Budowlani Ligota had sections for men’s soccer, weightlifting, and volleyball.

Sparta Katowice was founded in 1946 as Tęcza Katowice. It has operated under its current name since 1956. Initially, it was affiliated with the Voivodeship Sports Association. The club had sections for: acrobatics, artistic gymnastics, basketball, soccer, handball, weightlifting, volleyball, and diving. Among the more notable athletes of Sparta Katowice were Barbara Eustachewicz, Rudolf Hoeflich, Jan Suski, Stanisław Świetliński, Stanisław Wygas, and Ryszard Zawadziński. The club's headquarters are located at 4 S. Żeromski Street.

The Travos Katowice sled dog racing club also operated in Ligota-Panewniki. It was active during the first two decades of the 21st century. In 2019, it was liquidated. In Panewniki, there is a cycling club for people with disabilities – Górny Śląsk Silesia Team. Its headquarters are located at 335a Panewnicka Street. In 2007, there was 1 sports club in Ligota, 2 in Panewniki, and 1 in Kokociniec.

== Famous people ==
- Jerzy Kukuczka
- Herbert Ruff, pianist and composer

== Gallery ==
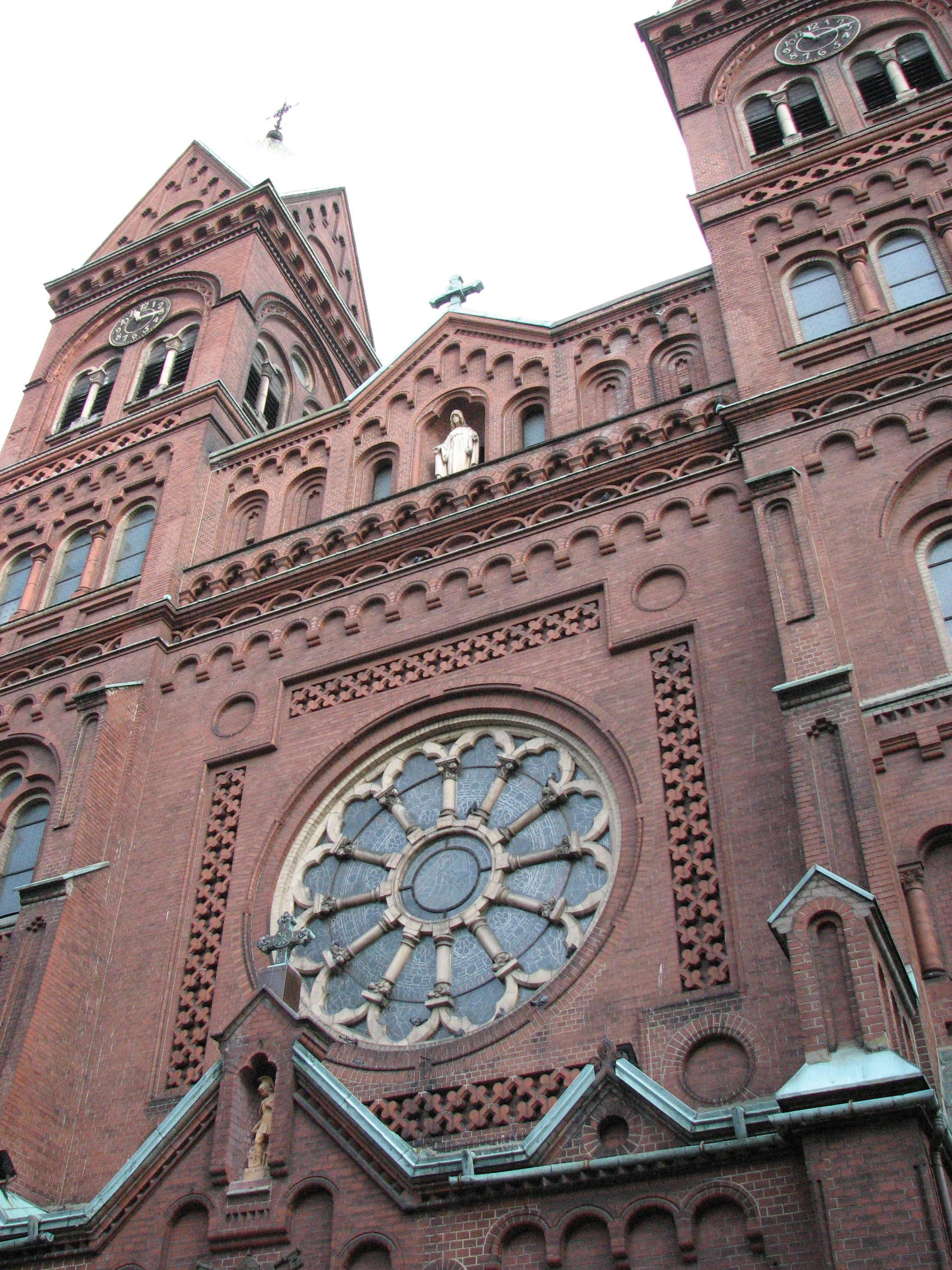
Facade of the Basilica of Saint Louis in Panewniki

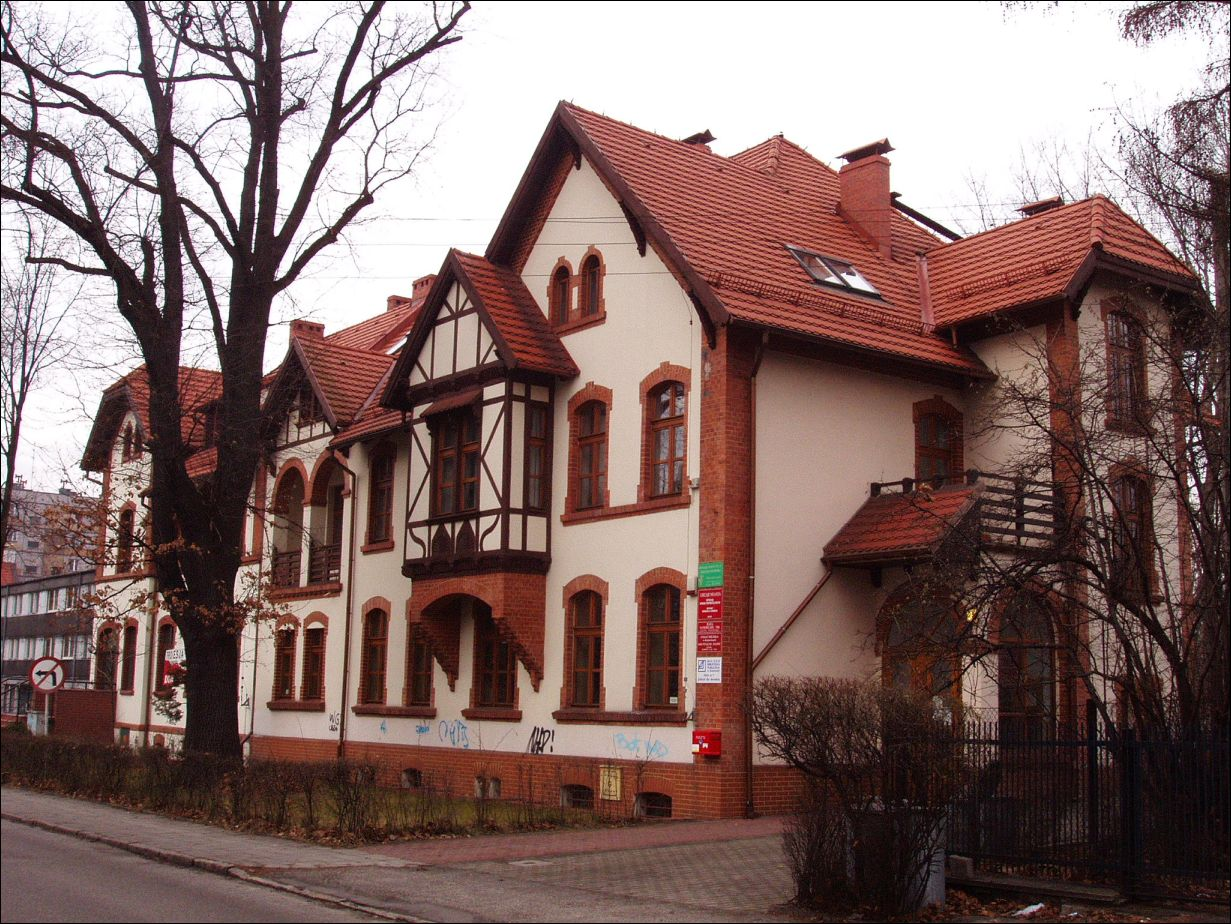
Library in Ligota

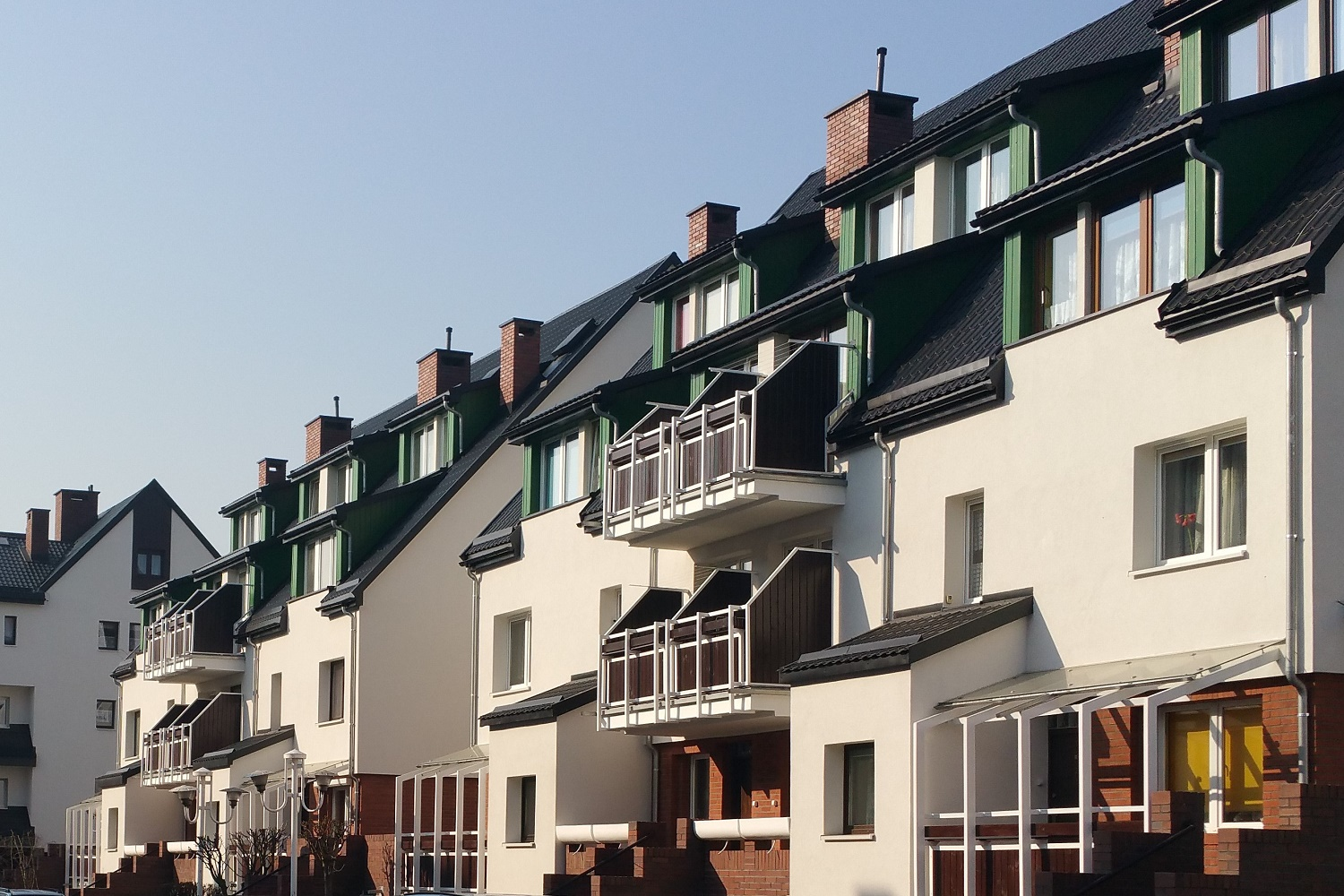
Modern housing in Kokociniec

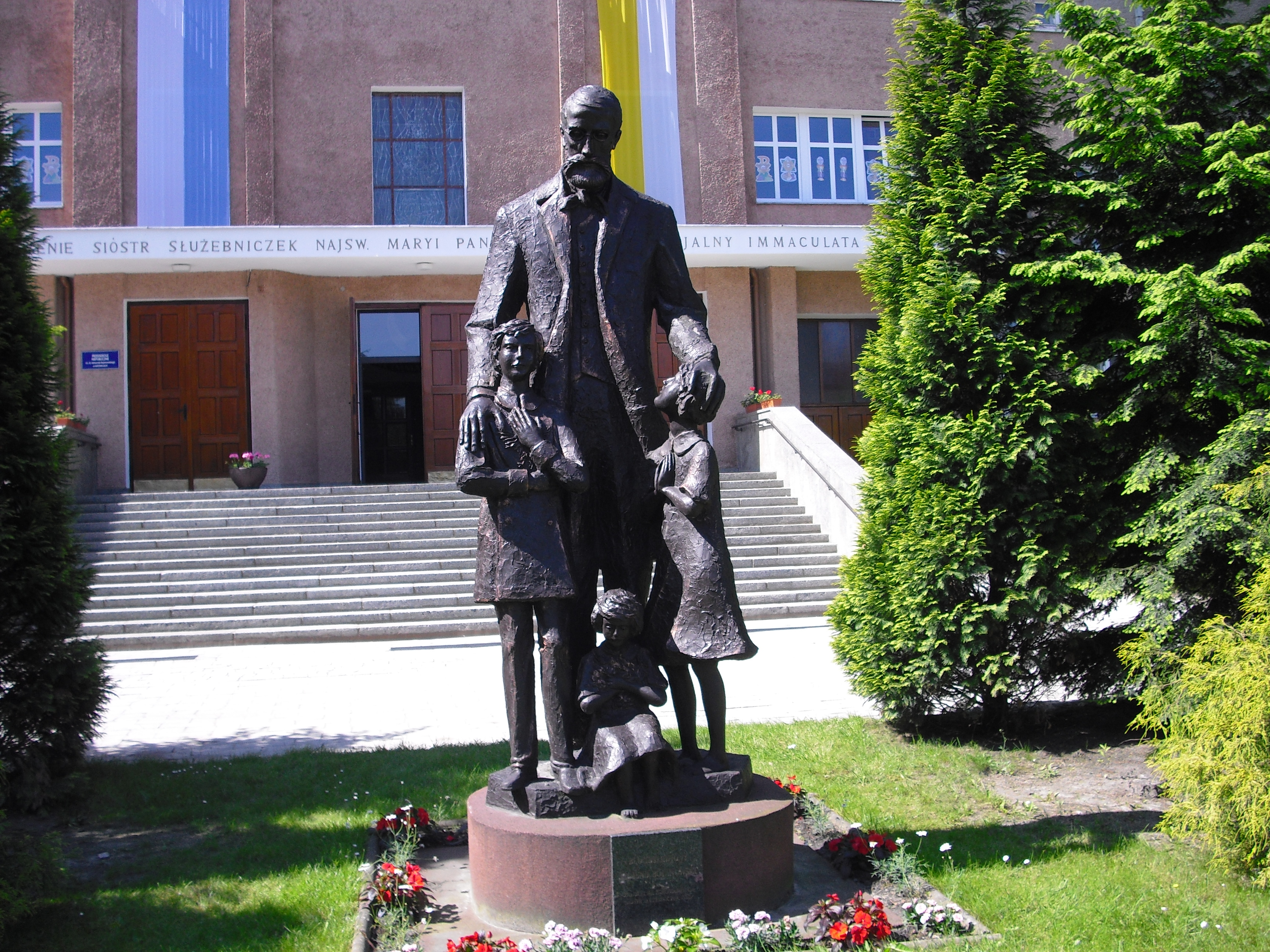
Edmund Bojanowski monument in Panewniki

== Bibliography ==
- Barciak, Antoni; Chojecka, Ewa; Fertacz, Sylwester, eds. (2012). Katowice. Środowisko, dzieje, kultura, język i społeczeństwo [Katowice. Environment, History, Culture, Language, and Society] (in Polish). Vol. 1–2. Katowice: Museum of History of Katowice. ISBN 978-83-87727-24-6.
- Bartoszek, Adam; Czekaj, Krzysztof; Trawkowska, Dobroniega (2012). Diagnoza problemów społecznych i monitoring polityki społecznej dla aktywizacji zasobów ludzkich w Katowicach [Diagnosis of Social Problems and Monitoring of Social Policy for the Activation of Human Resources in Katowice] (in Polish). Katowice: University of Silesia. ISBN 978-83-61061-97-7.
- Bulsa, Michał (2018). Ulice i place Katowic [Streets and Squares of Katowice] (in Polish) (3rd ed.). Katowice: Prasa i Książka. ISBN 978-83-63780-28-9.
- Chmielewska, Marta (2016). Morfologiczne przekształcenia przestrzeni miejskiej Katowic [Morphological Transformations of the Urban Space of Katowice] (in Polish). Katowice: Wydawnictwo Uniwersytetu Śląskiego. ISBN 978-83-8012-837-8.
- Drobek, Daria; Michalska, Ewa; Radecki, Ryszard; Perdyła, Magdalena (January 2014). Opracowanie ekofizjograficzne podstawowe z elementami opracowania ekofizjograficznego problemowego (problematyka ochrony dolin rzecznych oraz ograniczeń dla zagospodarowania terenu wynikających z wpływu działalności górniczej) dla potrzeb opracowania projektów miejscowych planów zagospodarowania przestrzennego obszarów położonych w mieście Katowice [Basic Ecophysiographic Study with Elements of a Problem-Oriented Ecophysiographic Study (Issues of River Valley Protection and Constraints on Land Development Resulting from the Impact of Mining Activity) for the Purposes of Preparing Draft Local Spatial Development Plans for Areas Located within the City of Katowice] (in Polish). Katowice: Werona.
- Drobniak, Adam; Polko, Adam; Plac, Klaudia, eds. (2014). Diagnoza sytuacji społeczno-ekonomicznej Miasta Katowice wraz z wyznaczeniem obszarów rewitalizacji i analizą strategiczną [Diagnosis of the Socio-Economic Situation of the City of Katowice Together with the Designation of Revitalisation Areas and Strategic Analysis] (PDF) (in Polish). Katowice: City of Katowice. ISBN 978-83-61061-97-7.
- Frużyński, Adam; Grzegorek, Grzegorz; Rygus, Piotr (2017). Kopalnie i huty Katowic [Mines and Ironworks of Katowice] (in Polish). Katowice: Prasa i Książka. ISBN 978-83-63780-23-4.
- Grzegorek, Grzegorz; Tabaczyński, Piotr (2014). Parafie i kościoły Katowic [Parishes and Churches of Katowice]. Katowice: Prasa i Książka. ISBN 978-83-63780-06-7.
- Nadolski, Przemysław; Soida, Krzysztof; Keller, Dawid; Wieczorek, Edward (2017). Węzeł kolejowy Katowice [Katowice Railway Junction]. Rybnik: Eurosprinter. ISBN 978-83-63652-24-1. OCLC 1010931171.
- Płonka, Grzegorz, ed. (2010). Zarys dziejów Ligoty i Panewnik: od zarania do czasów współczesnych [An Outline History of Ligota and Panewniki: from the Beginnings to the Present Day] (in Polish). Katowice: Śląsk. ISBN 978-83-7164-621-8. OCLC 670291340.
- Płonka, Grzegorz, ed. (2015). Przewodnik po Ligocie i Panewnikach [Guide to Ligota and Panewniki] (in Polish). Katowice: Council of Auxiliary Unit No. 6 Ligota–Panewniki.
- Raport o stanie miasta Katowice 2013 [Report on the State of the City of Katowice 2013] (PDF) (in Polish). Katowice: Urząd Miasta Katowice. 2014.
- Steuer, Antoni (2023). "Leksykon struktur katowickiego sportu i turystyki" [Lexicon of Katowice Sport and Tourism Structures]. mhk.katowice.pl (in Polish). Archived from the original on 14 February 2023.
- Szaraniec, Lech (1996). Osady i osiedla Katowic [Settlements and Housing Estates of Katowice] (in Polish). Katowice: Artur. ISBN 83-905115-0-9.
- Witaszek, Jan (2008). "Ligota. Teren, granice i drogi" [Ligota. Territory, Boundaries, and Roads]. In Złoty, Andrzej (ed.). Ligota, Murcki... i inne szkice historyczne [Ligota, Murcki... and Other Historical Sketches] (in Polish). Katowice: Drukarnia Archidiecezjalna. ISBN 978-83-7593-014-6. OCLC 316485680.
- Zemła, Marek, ed. (25 April 2012). Studium uwarunkowań i kierunków zagospodarowania przestrzennego miasta Katowice – II edycja. Część 1. Uwarunkowania zagospodarowania przestrzennego [Study of the Conditions and Directions of Spatial Development of the City of Katowice – Second Edition. Part One. Conditions of Spatial Development] (PDF) (in Polish). Katowice: Biuro Rozwoju Regionu.
