= Calvary (sanctuary) =

Type of Christian sacred place

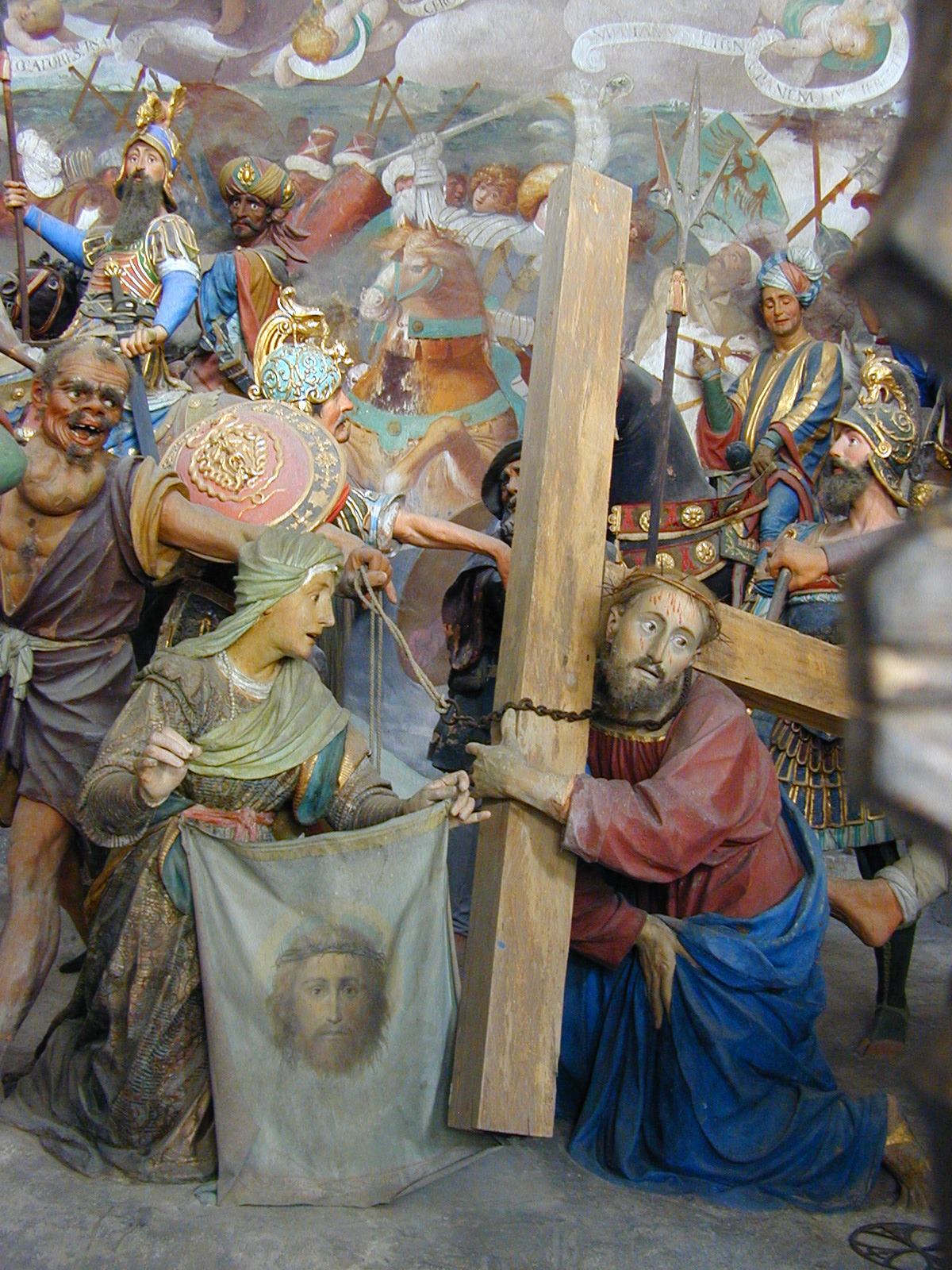
Sacro Monte di Varallo, Tabacchetti and Giovanni d'Enrico, Christ on the Road to Calvary, 1599–1600, sculpted main figures and a fresco behind

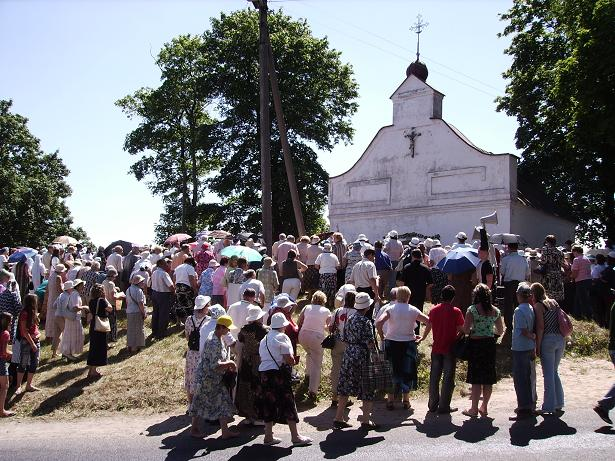
Devotions at Žemaičių Kalvarija in Lithuania, 2006

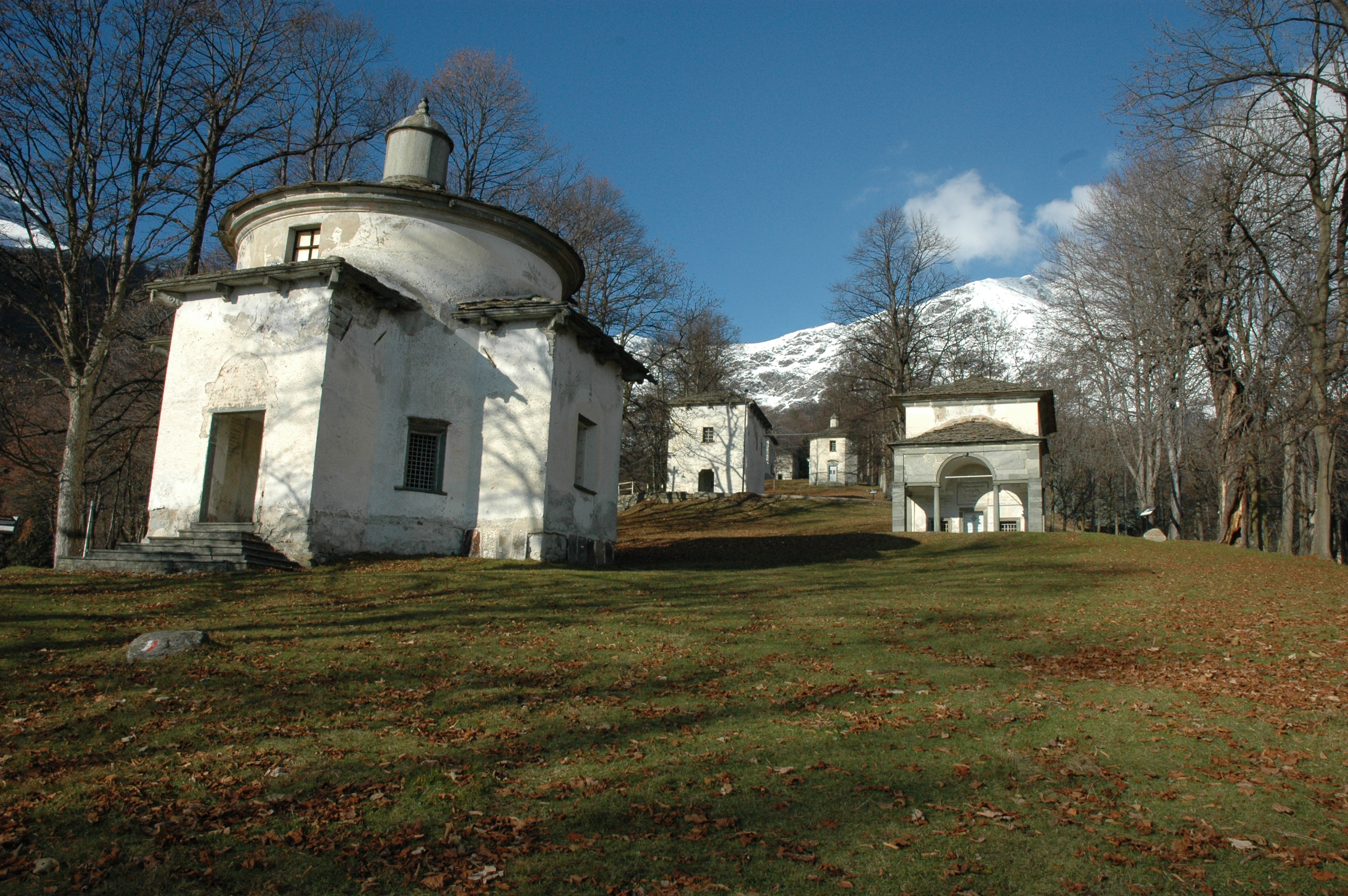
Chapels at the Sacro Monte di Oropa

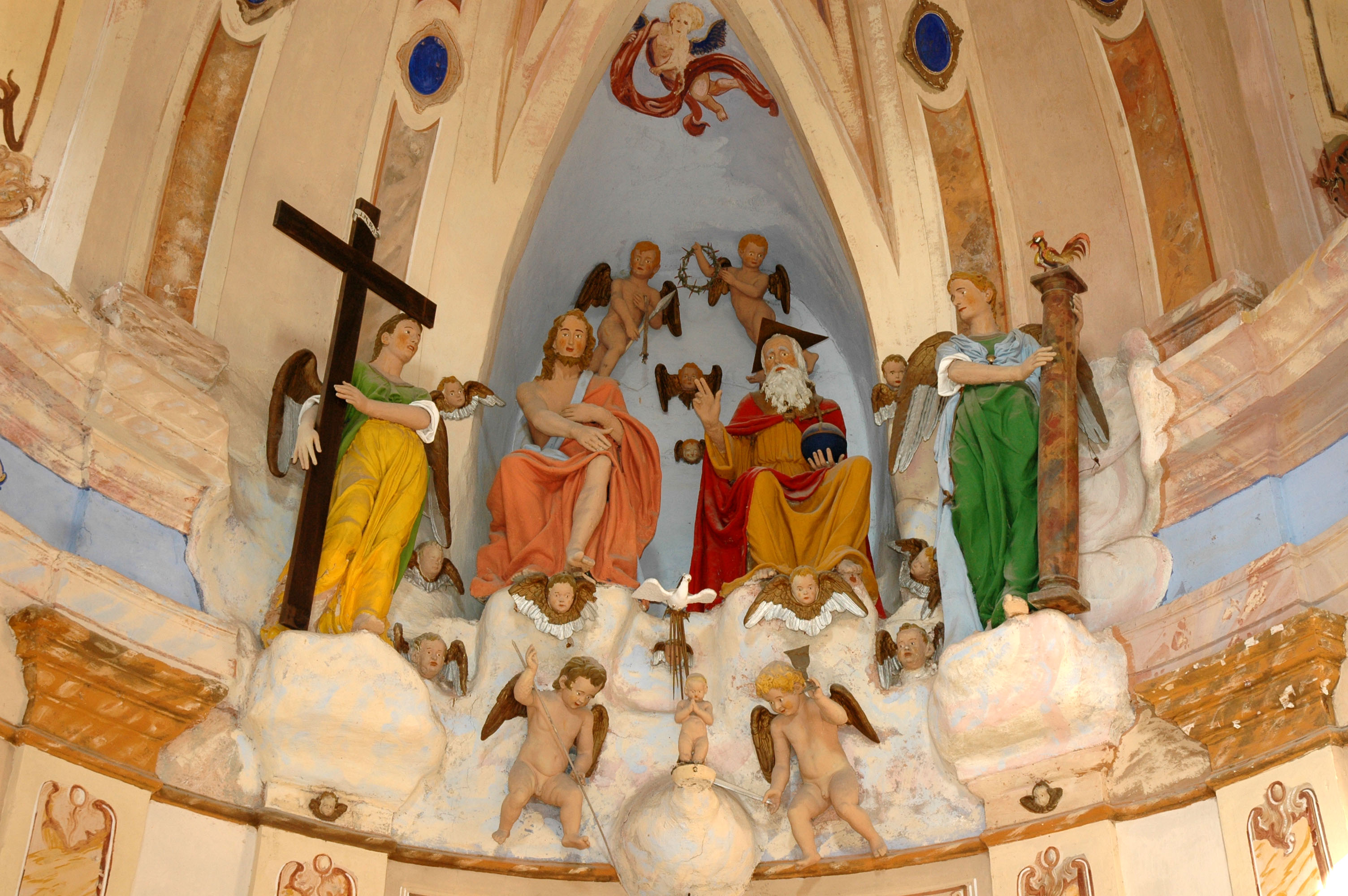
The Conception of Mary at the Sacro Monte di Oropa

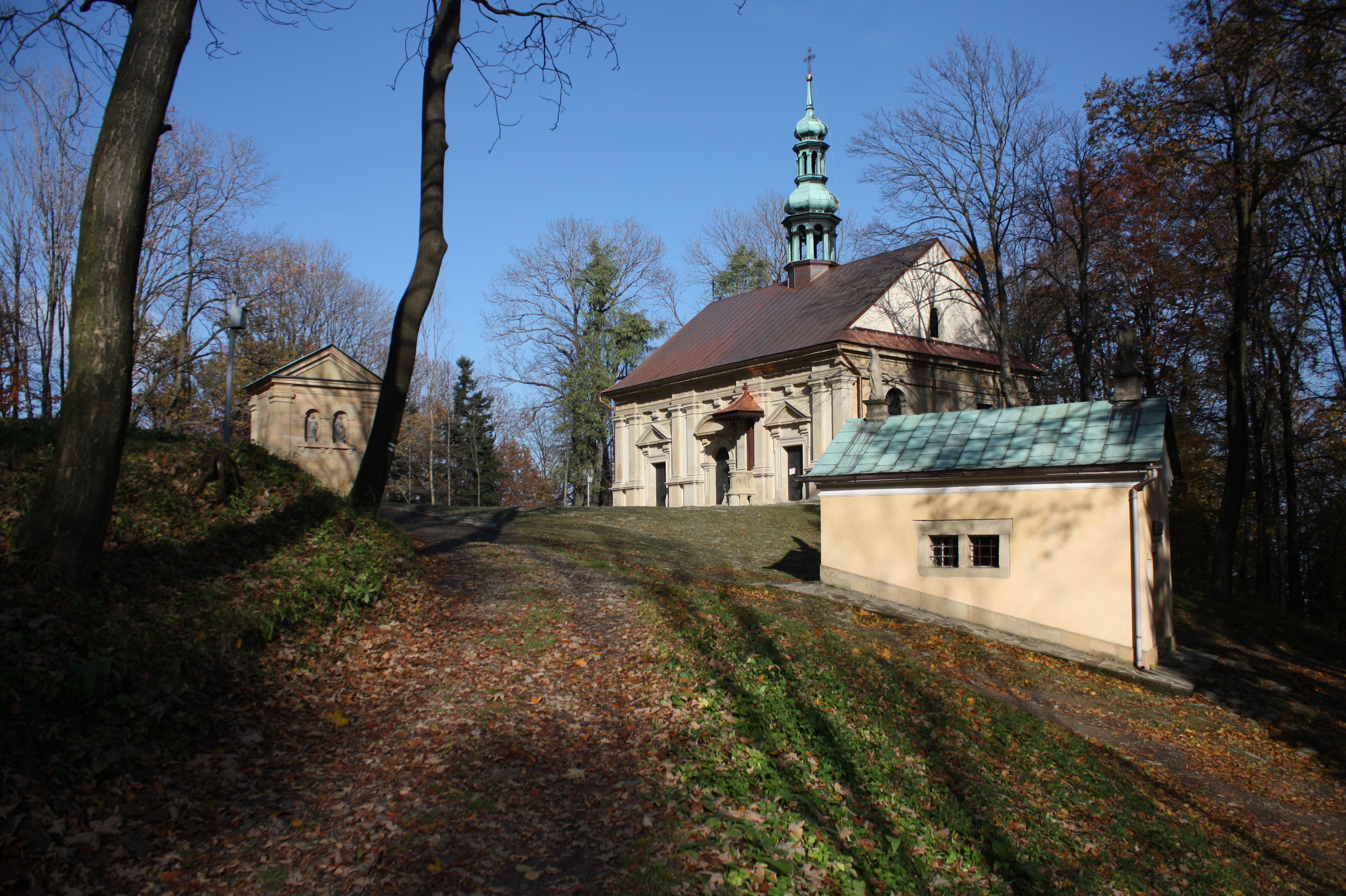
Chapels in Kalwaria Zebrzydowska

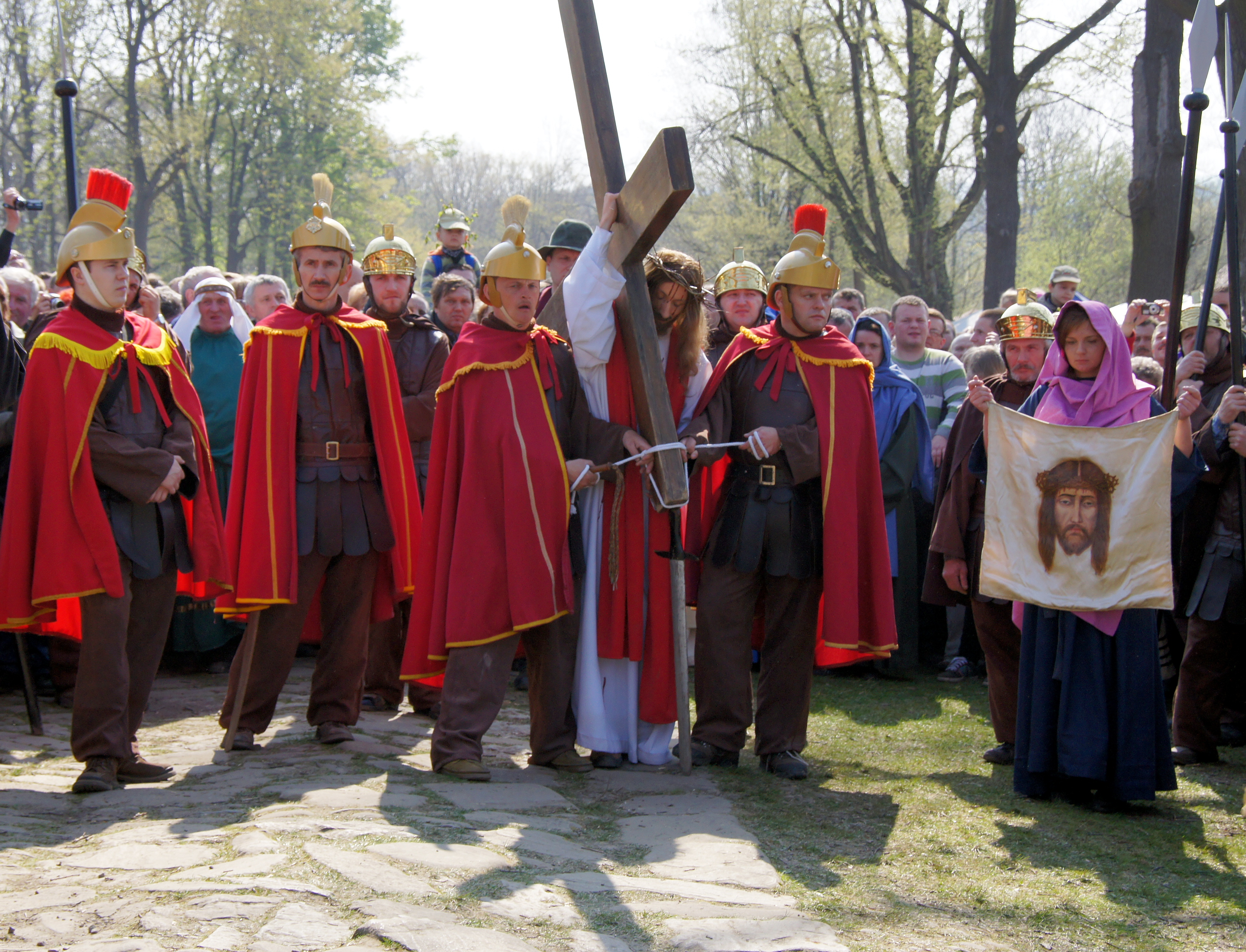
Mystery play at Kalwaria Zebrzydowska, 2011

A calvary, also called calvary hill, Sacred Mount, or Sacred Mountain, is a type of Christian sacred place, built on the slopes of a hill, composed by a set of chapels, usually laid out in the form of a pilgrims' way. It is intended to represent the passion of Jesus Christ and takes its name after Calvary, the hill in Jerusalem where Jesus was crucified.

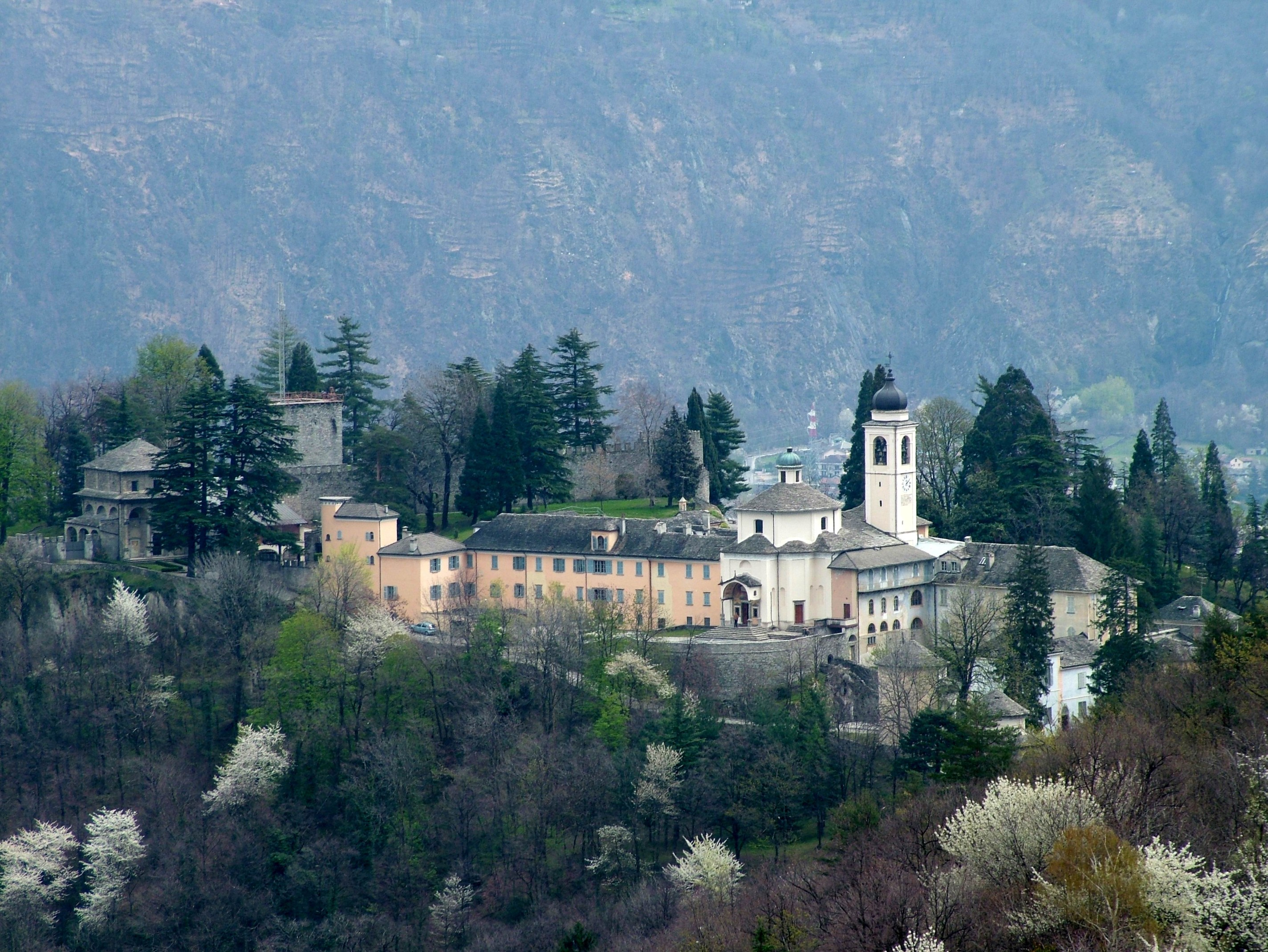
Sacro Monte di Domodossola

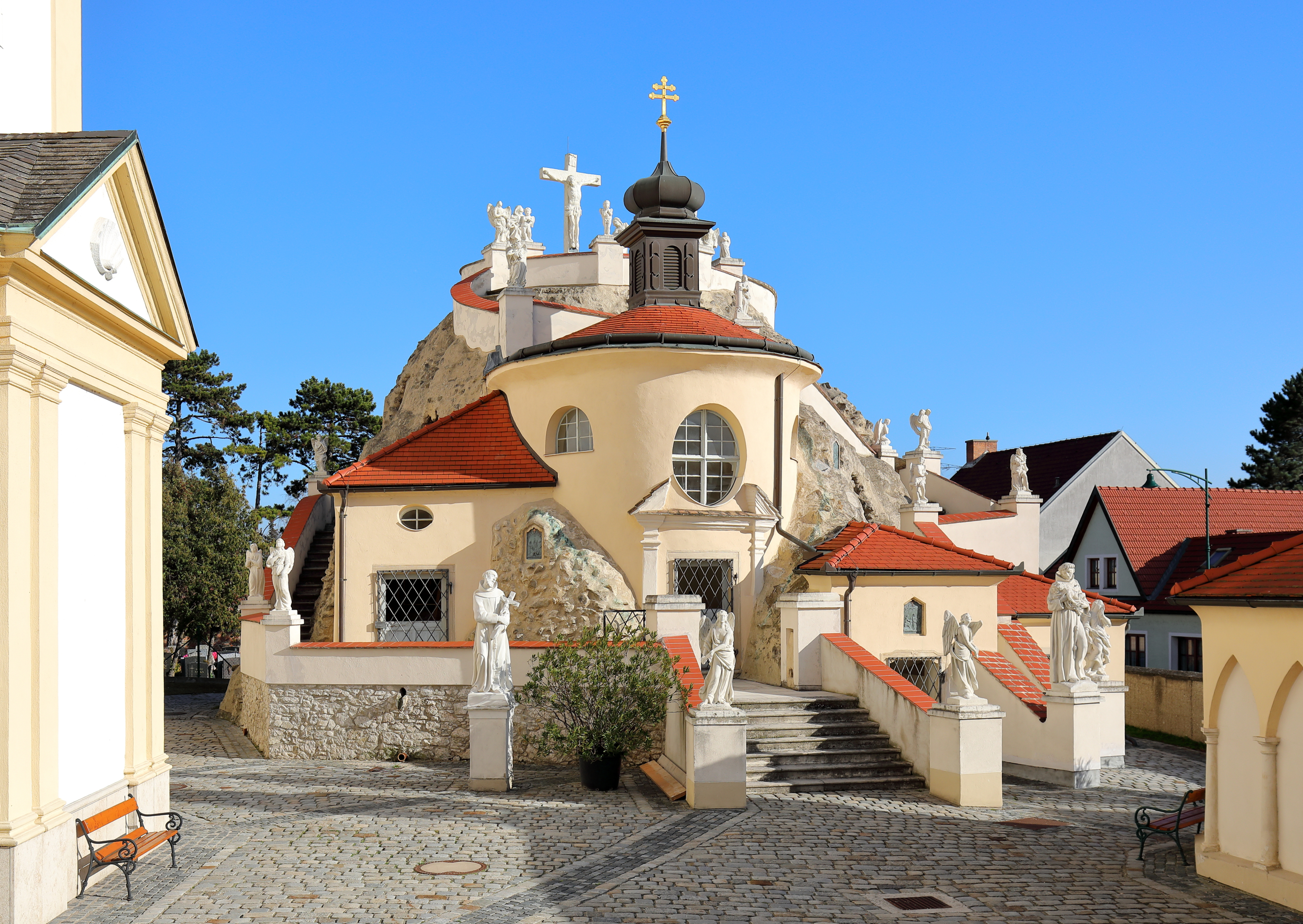
Calvary hill in Maria Lanzendorf (1700)

These function as greatly expanded versions of the Stations of the Cross that are usual in Catholic churches, allowing the devout to follow the progress of the stages of the Passion of Christ along the Via Dolorosa in Jerusalem. Each chapel contains a large image of the scene from the Passion it commemorates, sometimes in sculpture, that may be up to life-size. This kind of shrine was especially popular in the Baroque period when the Holy Land was under Ottoman Turkish rule and it was dangerous and highly difficult to make a pilgrimage to the Church of the Holy Sepulchre in Jerusalem.

Calvaries were especially popular with the Franciscan and Jesuit orders, and are most common in Italy, the Catholic regions of Germany, and Habsburg-ruled Central Europe. They were usually placed in parks near a church or a monastery, typically on a hill which the visitor gradually ascends. Italian ones are usually called a sacro monte ("holy mountain" or "hill"); there are a group of nine Sacri Monti of Piedmont and Lombardy that are especially notable; their dates of foundation vary between 1486 and 1712. Devotions would be most popular in Passion Week, before Easter, when large processions around the stations would be held, and mystery plays might also be acted. If a calvary was established in an inhabited place, it might result in a location of a new village or town. Several villages and towns are named after such a complex.

== Terminology ==
The Mount of Calvary was the site outside the gates of Jerusalem where the crucifixion of Christ took place. The scene was replicated around the world in numerous "calvary hills" after the Counter-Reformation and they are used by Roman Catholics in particular as part of their worship and veneration of God.

The term is derived from St Jerome's Ecclesiastical Latin translation in the Vulgate of the Aramaic name for original hill, Golgotha, where it is termed calvariae locus "the place of the skull". Martin Luther translated Golgatha as "skull place" (Scheddelstet). This translation is debated; at the very least it is not clear whether it referred to the shape of the hill, its use as a place of execution or burial or refers to something else.

"Calvary hill" today refers to a roughly life-size depiction of the scenes of the Passion of Christ, with sculptures of additional figures. These scenes are set up on the slopes of a hill. The traditional fourteen Stations of the Cross are usually laid out on the way up to the top of the pilgrimage hill and there is often a small, remote church or chapel located between a few dozen to several hundred metres away.

Calvary hills must not be confused with calvaries, which are a specific type of wayside monumental crucifix, a tradition mostly found in Brittany especially in the Finistère, built in parish closes between 1450 and the 17th century.

Representative examples

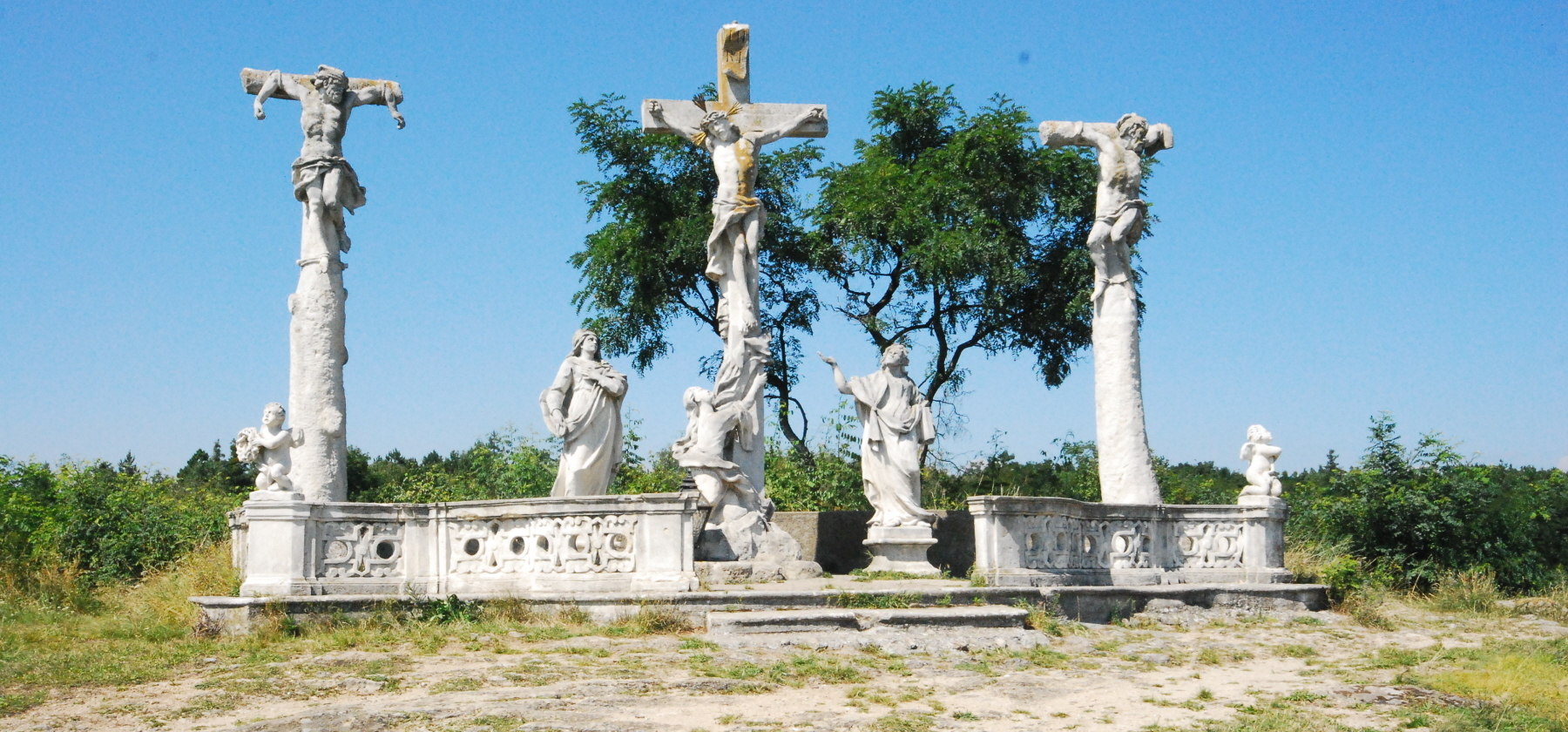
Multi-figure wayside monument
(Retz)

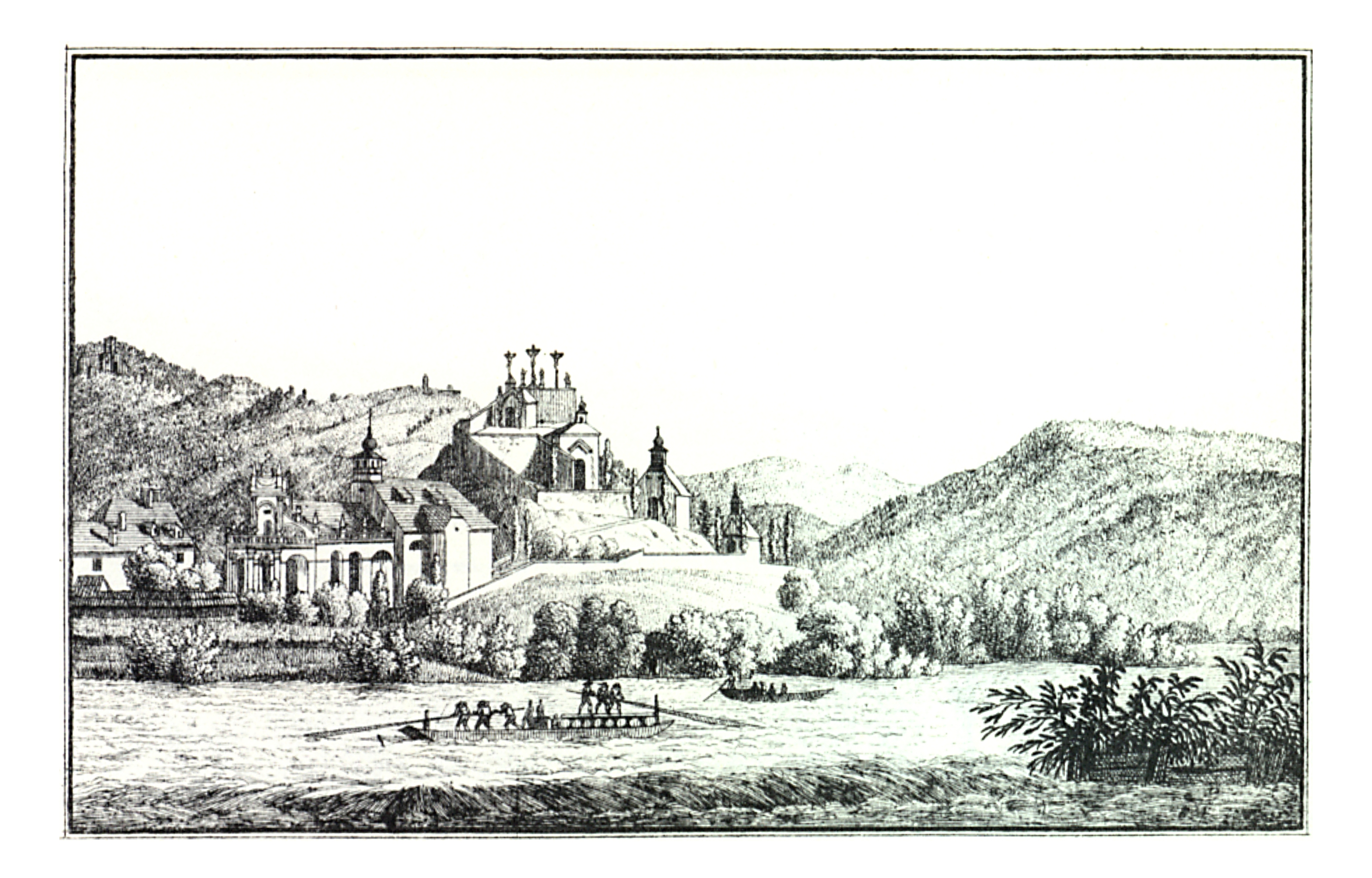
The Calvary Hill in Lend (Graz) around 1830

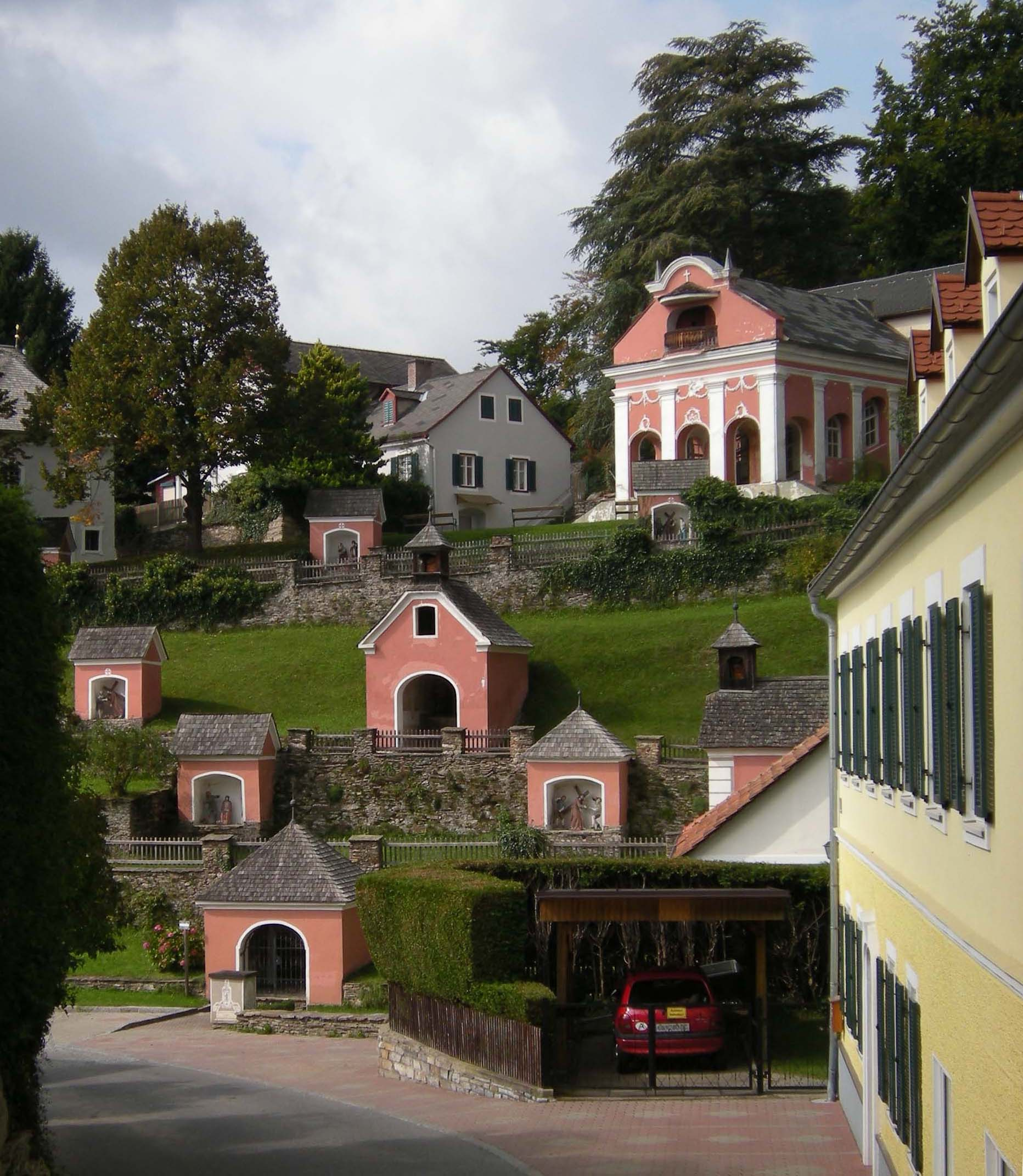
Calvary hill and Stations of the Cross chapel
(St. Radegund bei Graz)

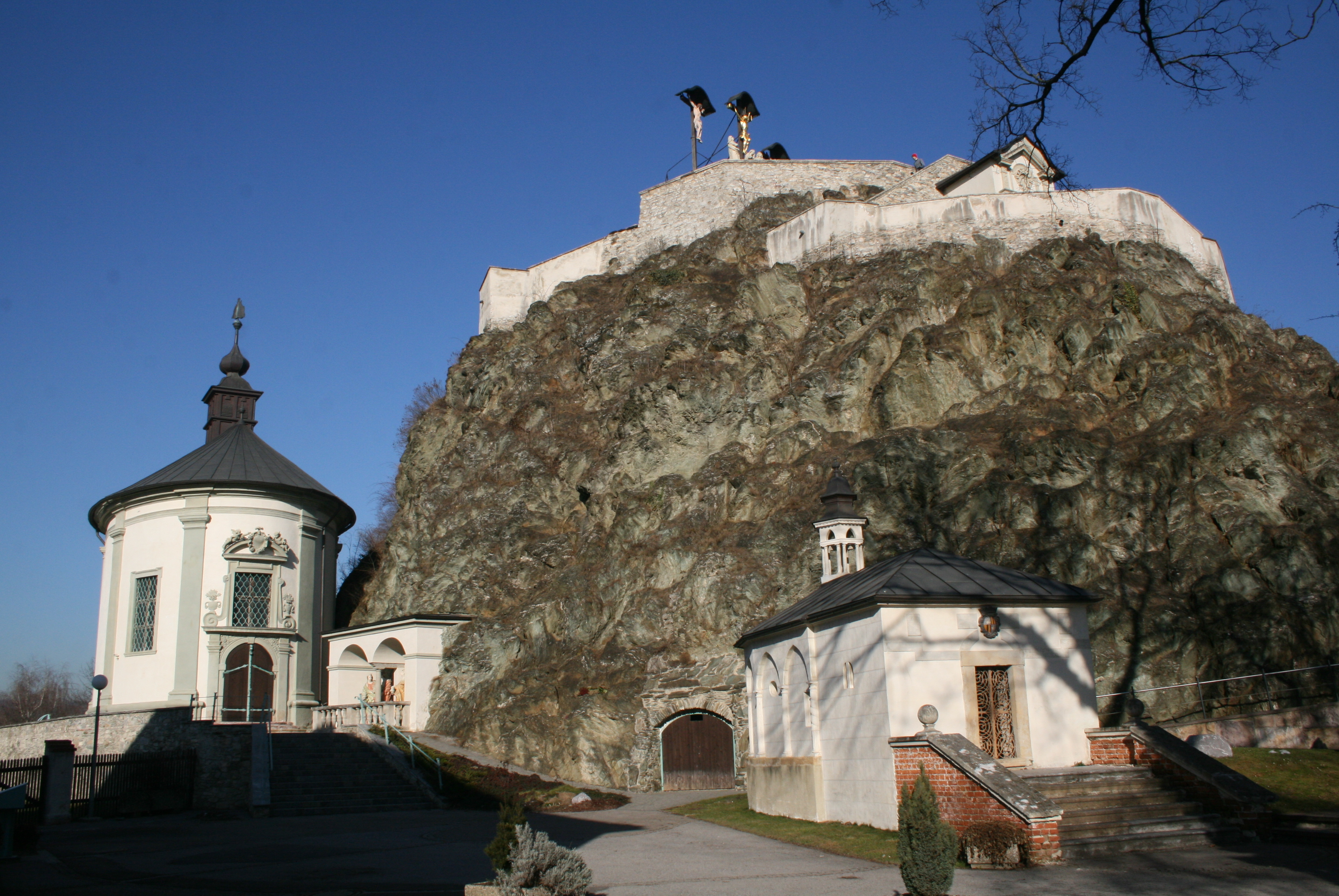
Shrine with numerous chapels
(Graz)

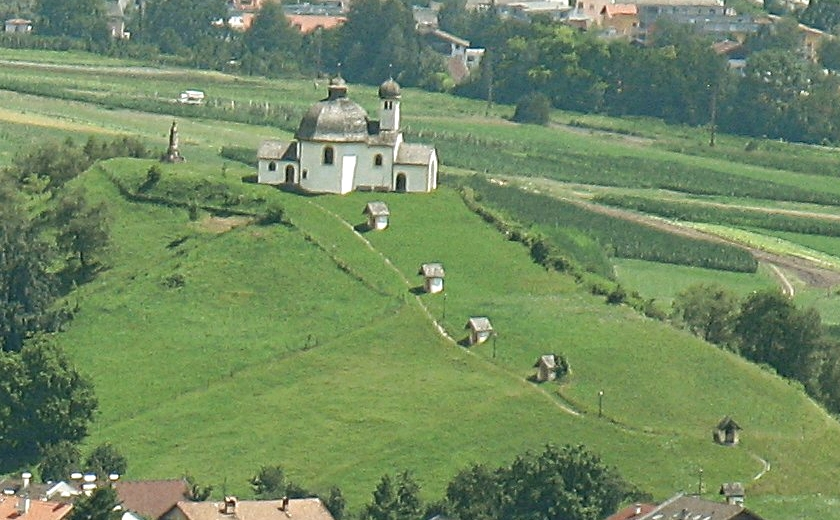
Hill chapel with Stations of the Cross
(Arzl bei Innsbruck)

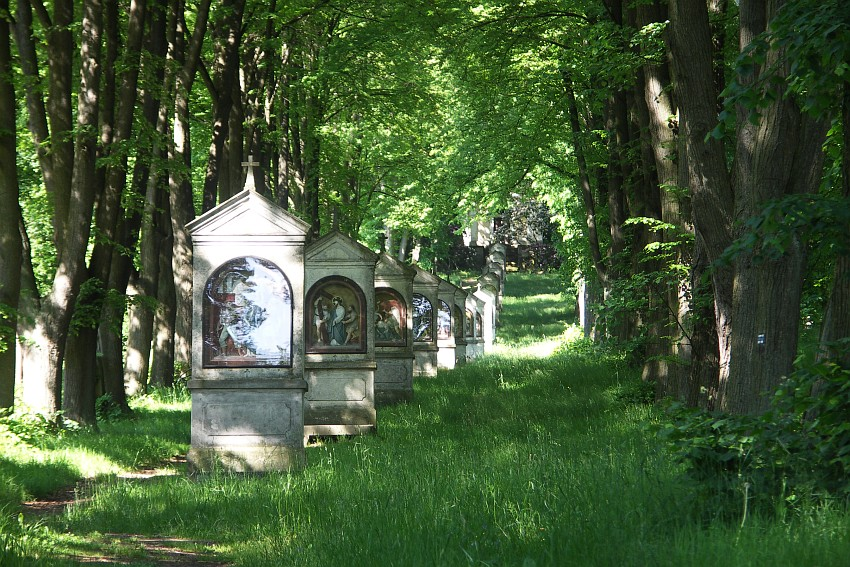
Park-like layout
(Cvikov)

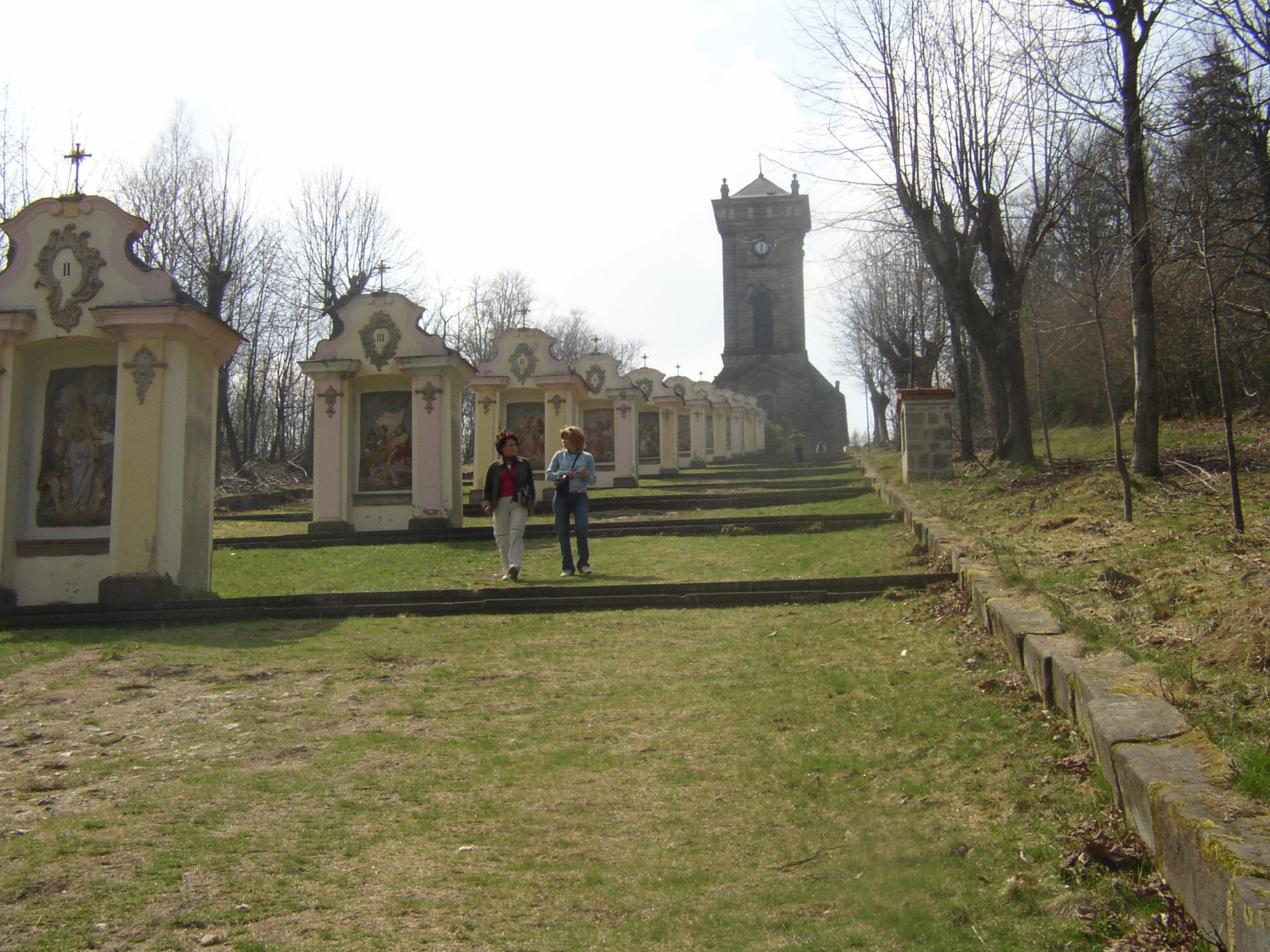
Freely visible landscape monument on the summit
(Calvary hill near Jiřetín pod Jedlovou)

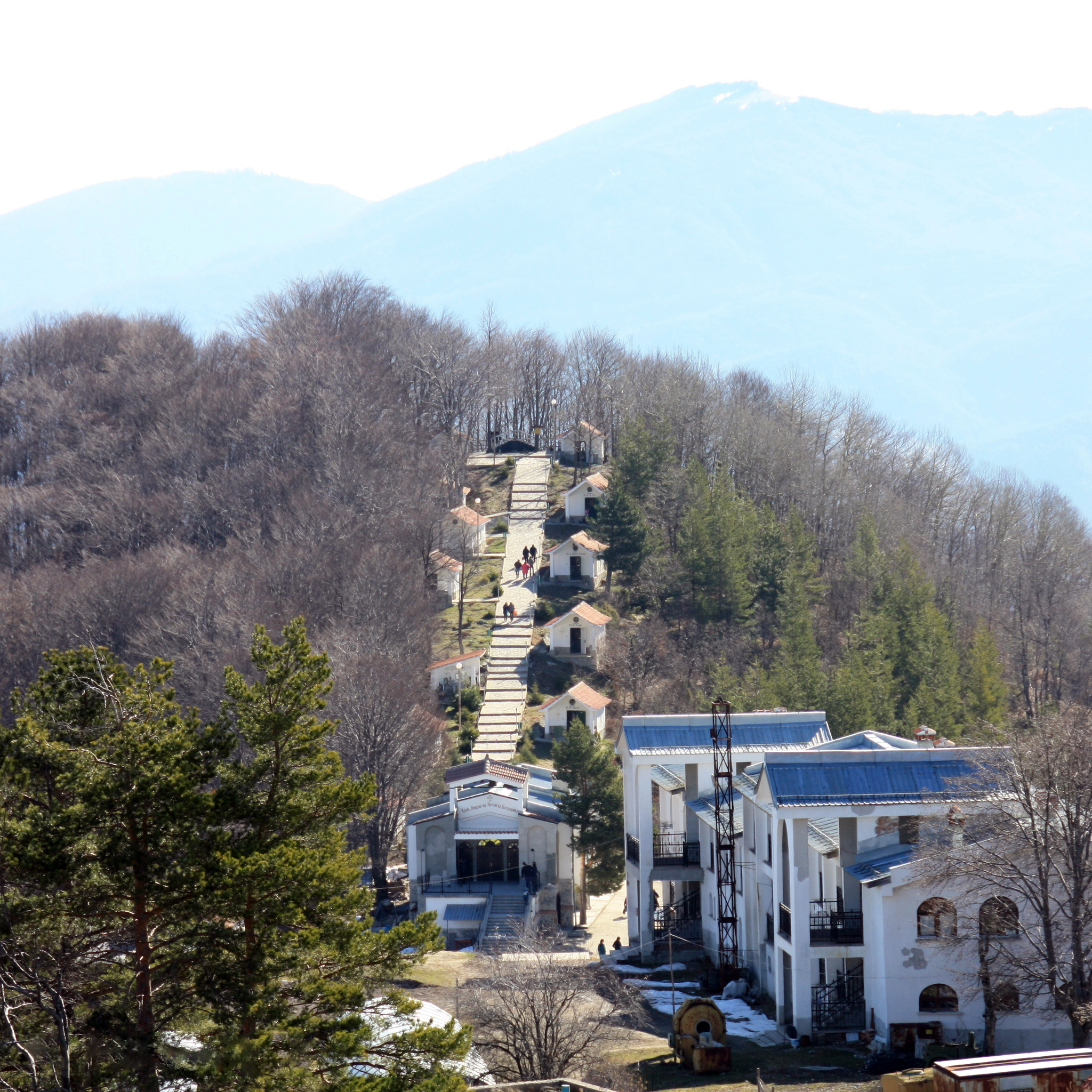
Layout at a monastery
(Krastowa Gora)

== Calvaries in the world ==
=== Austria ===
==== Burgenland ====
- Calvary Hill, Bergkirche in Eisenstadt
- Calvary Hill, Frauenkirchen
- Calvary Hill, Lockenhaus
- in Neusiedl am See
- in Pinkafeld

==== Carinthia ====
- in Sankt Paul im Lavanttal
- in Sankt Stefan im Gailtal

==== Lower Austria ====
- near the Aggsbach Charterhouse in Aggsbach, a village in the Wachau
- in Falkenstein in the wine quarter
- in Kirchberg am Wechsel
- in Lilienfeld, largest calvary hill in Austria
- in Marbach an der Donau
- in Maria-Lanzendorf near Vienna
- in Pillersdorf in the wine quarter
- Calvary Hill, Retz
- in Eggenburg
- in Zwettl

==== Upper Austria ====
- Calvary Hill, Aigen in the Mühlkreis
- in Freistadt
- Calvary Hill, Gosau
- Calvary Hill, Kremsmünster
- in St. Martin im Innkreis
- in Schwertberg

==== Salzburg ====
- Calvary Hill, Maria Bühel
- Calvary Hill, Maria Plain
- in Oberndorf bei Salzburg

==== Styria ====
- Calvary Hill, (Bruck an der Mur)
- Calvary Hill, (Deutschfeistritz)
- Kalvarienberg (Graz)
- Calvary Hill, Leoben
- in Sankt Margarethen bei Knittelfeld
- Calvary Hill (Sankt Radegund bei Graz)
- Calvary Hill, (Feldbach)

==== Tyrol ====
- Calvary Hill Chapel, Arzl, in the Innsbruck quarter of Arzl
- in Kufstein
- Calvary Hill, Thaur

==== Vienna ====
- in Hernals

=== Belarus ===
- in Miadziel (a small town north of Minsk (Мядзел))
- in Minsk (Мінск)

=== Belgium ===
- in Moresnet/Plombières
- in Malmedy

=== Bolivia ===
- Cerro Calvario

=== Canada ===
- The Oka Calvary Trail near Oka, Québec

=== Croatia ===
- Calvary Hill near Aljmaš

=== Czech Republic ===
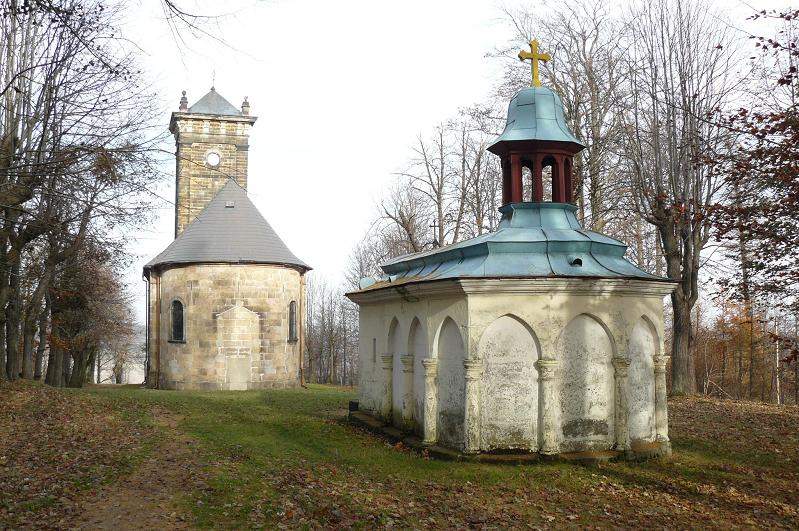
Chapels at the calvary in Jiřetín pod Jedlovou, Czech Republic

- in Jiřetín pod Jedlovou
- in Cvikov

=== Ethiopia ===
- Lalibela

=== England ===
Mount St Bernard Abbey, Leicestershire.

=== Germany ===
(in alphabetical order by place)

- Calvary Hill, Ahrweiler (with Kalvarienberg Abbey), Ahrweiler, county of Ahrweiler, Rhineland-Palatinate
- Calvary Hill, Aiterbach, Aiterbach, county of Freising, Bavaria
- Calvary Hill Chapel, Altomünster
- in Bad Kissingen
- in Bad Neuenahr-Ahrweiler (as a school)
- in Bad Laer
- in Bad Tölz, Bad Tölz-Wolfratshausen, Bavaria
- in Berchtesgaden
- Calvary Hill, Bergheim, Bergheim, Rhein-Erft-Kreis, North Rhine-Westphalia
- in Bidingen, county of Ostallgäu
- in Birkungen (Thuringia)
- in Burladingen
- in Cham (Upper Palatinate)
- in Donauwörth
- Calvary Hill, Dorweiler, Dorweiler, county of Düren, North Rhine-Westphalia
- in Ebnath in the Oberpfalz
- in Falkenberg (Oberpfalz)
- in Fichtelberg (Oberfranken)
- in Fulda
- Calvary Hill, Füssen, county of Ostallgäu, Bavaria
- Calvary Hill, Greding, county of Roth, Bavaria
- in Görlitz in the Heiligen-Grab-Ensemble
- Calvary Hill, Gundelsheim, Württemberg
- in Immenstadt
- near the Pilgrimage Church, Allerheiligen in Jettingen-Scheppach
- in the pilgrimage village of Kinzweiler
- Calvary Hill, Kirchenthumbach, Kirchenthumbach, county of Neustadt an der Waldnaab, Bavaria
- (Klosterlechfeld see below)
- in Konnersreuth
- Calvary Hill, Lauterhofen, county of Neumarkt in the Oberpfalz, Bavaria
- in Lenggries
- in Lübeck (Jerusalemsberg)
- in Marsberg
- at Kreuzberg Abbey in the Rhön
- Calvary Hill, Neusath, county of Schwandorf, Bavaria
- in Ostritz, Sachsen
- at St. Marienthal Abbey
- Calvary Hill, Parsberg, county of Neumarkt in the Upper Palatinate, Bavaria
- in Peiting in Upper Bavaria
- in Pfreimd
- in Pillig in Rhineland-Palatinate
- in Pobenhausen and also in Palling, both in Upper Bavaria
- in Possenhofen municipality of Pöcking on Lake Starnberg
- in the Devil's Cave near Pottenstein
- Calvary Hill, Prüm, Eifelkreis Bitburg-Prüm, Rhineland-Palatinate
- Calvary Hill, Alendorf, in the municipality of Blankenheim
- Calvary Hill, Reicholzried
- in Sichtigvor on the Loermund
- in Stühlingen
- Calvary Hill, Schwabegg, county of Augsburg, Bavaria
- in Sonthofen
- in Straelen on the Lower Rhine
- bei Wettenhausen in the municipality of Kammeltal
- in Wenigmünchen (near Munich)
- in Xanten am Niederrhein
- in Zell in the Wiesental chapel on the Möhrenberg
- the Calvary Hill at the pilgrimage site of Klosterlechfeld in Bavaria there is not stations of the cross path, but a monument with outside staircase.

=== Greece ===
- on the hill of Filerimos on Rhodes

=== Hungary ===
- Calvary Hill in Pécs

=== Italy ===
- Sacri Monti of Piedmont and Lombardy
- Sacro Monte di Varallo
- Sacred Mount Calvary of Domodossola
- San Vivaldo Monastery in Montaione
- Sacro Monte di Orta
- Sacro Monte di Varese
- Sacro Monte di Crea
- Sacro Monte di Ghiffa
- Sacro Monte di Ossuccio
- Sacro Monte di Oropa
- Sacro Monte di Belmonte

=== Lithuania ===
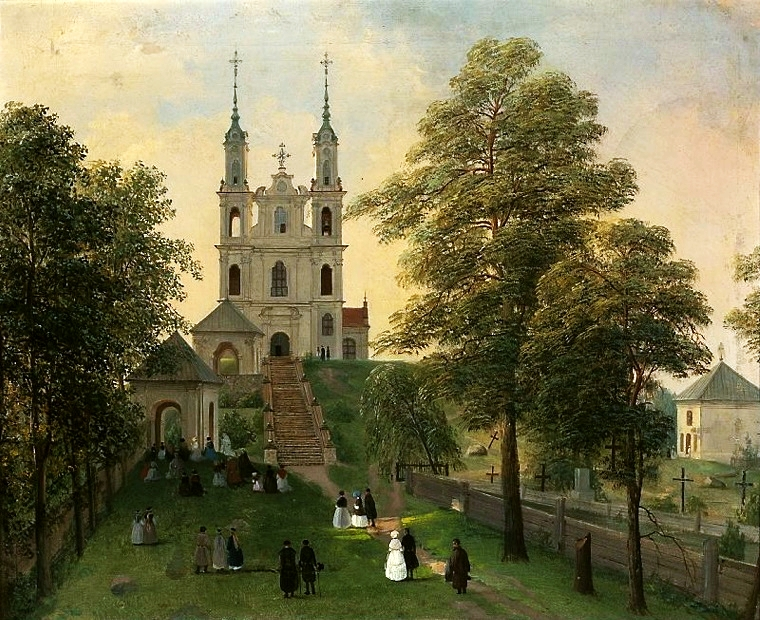
A 17th century Verkiai Calvary in Vilnius, Lithuania, c. 1840s

- Žemaičių Kalvarija
- Kalvarija, Lithuania
- Verkiai Calvary

=== Poland ===
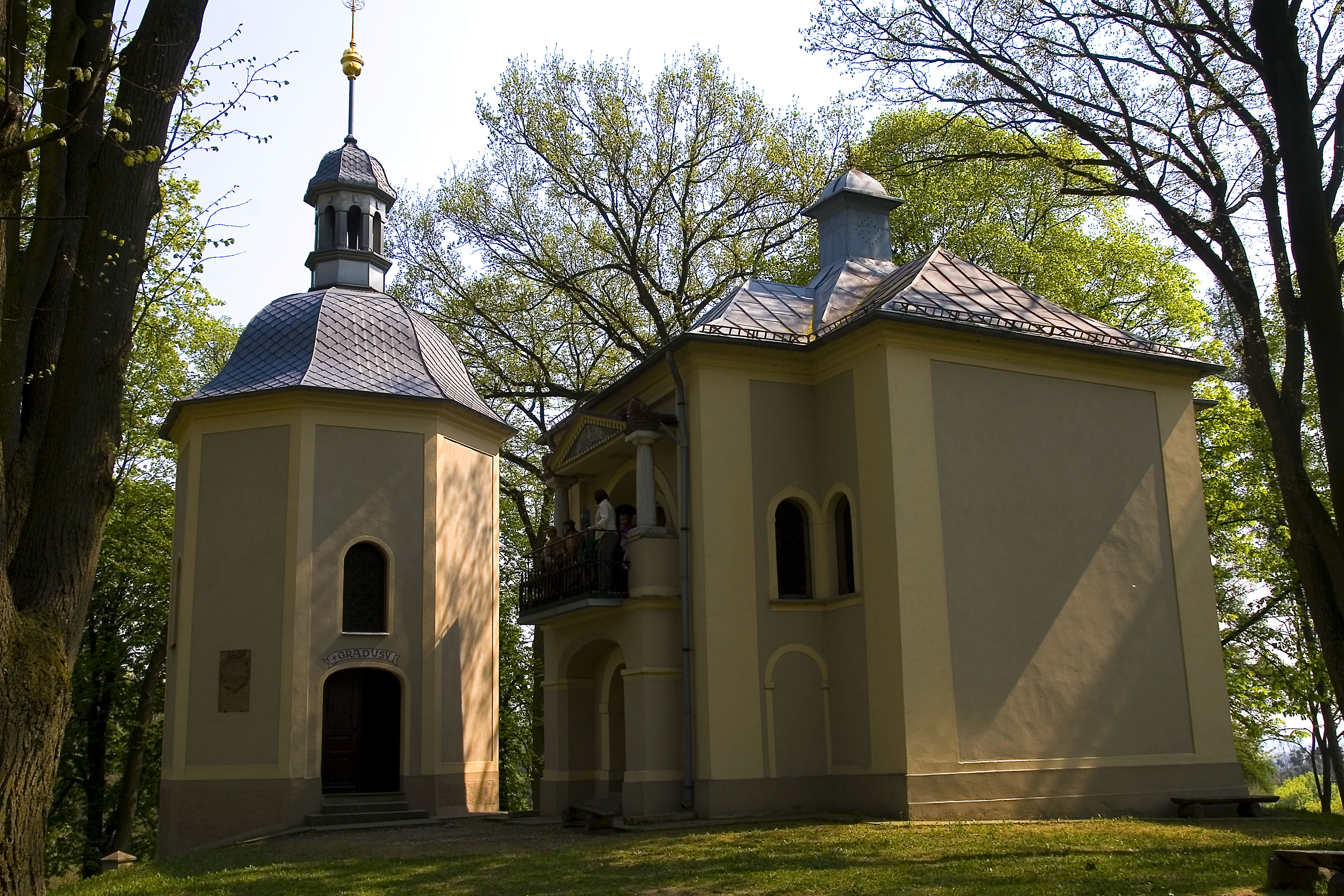
Chapels at the calvary in Góra Świętej Anny, Poland

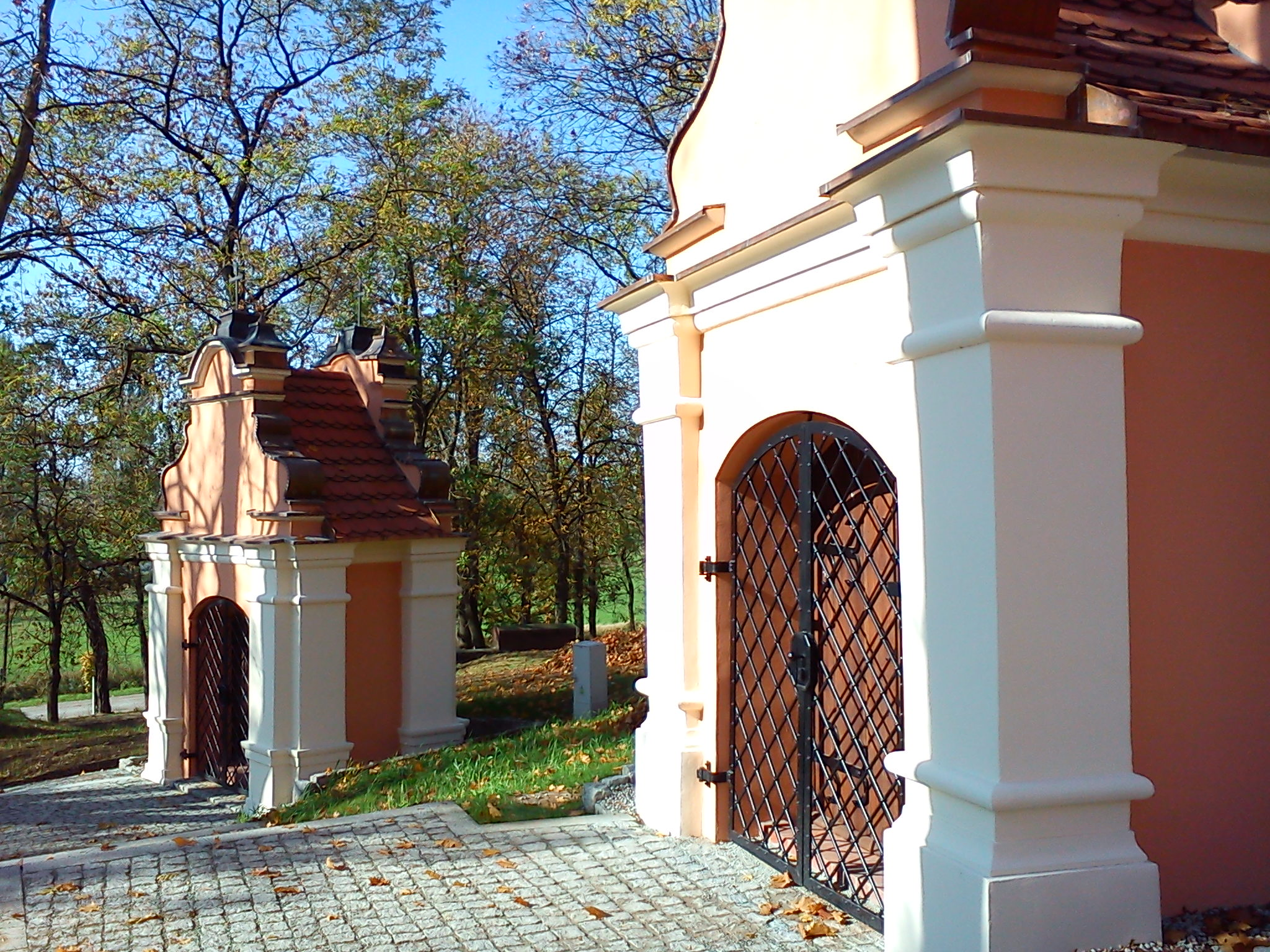
Chapels at the Pakość Calvary, Poland

- Kalwaria Zebrzydowska, near Kraków
- Góra Kalwaria, near Warsaw
- Wejherowo, near Gdańsk
- Kalwaria Pacławska, near Przemyśl
- Kalwaria Panewnicka, in Katowice
- Pakość, near Inowrocław
- Góra Świętej Anny, near Opole
- Wambierzyce, near Kłodzko
- Ujście, near Piła
- Krzeszów, near Wałbrzych
- Pszów, near Wodzisław Śląski
- Bardo, near Kłodzko
- Piekary Śląskie, near Bytom
- Głotowo, near Olsztyn
- Wiele, near Chojnice
- Kodeń, near Biała Podlaska

=== Romania ===
- in the village of Billed, county of Timiș

=== Slovakia ===
- Kalvária Banská Štiavnica
- Prešov
- Spišský Jeruzalem
- Bratislava - the oldest calvary in Hungarian kingdom
- Marianka
- Skalica
- Rožňava
- Nitra
- Doľany, Pezinok District

=== Slovenia ===
- in Šmarje pri Jelšah
- Kalvarija (Maribor)

=== Spain ===
- in Poll ença

=== United States ===
- Assumption Chapel, near Cold Spring, Minnesota
- Calvary Hill (formerly), St Cloud, Minnesota
- Way of the Cross, New Ulm, Minnesota

=== Wales ===
- St David's Capuchin Friary, Pantasaph, Flintshire

== See also ==
- blessed Alvarez of Córdoba
- Christian Kruik van Adrichem
- Stations of the Cross

== Literature ==
German:

- Atlas der europäischen Heiligen Berge, Kalvarienberge und Devotionsstätten (in German), Turin: Direktion für Tourismus, Sport und Gärten der Region Piemont, 2003
- Walter Brunner (1990), Steirische Kalvarienberge (in German), Graz etc.: Schnider, ISBN 3-900993-02-5
- Elisabeth Roth (1967), Der volkreiche Kalvarienberg in Literatur und Bildkunst des Spätmittelalters (in German) (2nd ed.), Berlin: Erich Schmidt – Philologische Studien und Quellen 2, ISSN 0554-0674
- Louise-Marie Tillet (1989), Reisewege durch die Bretagne. Calvaires und romanische Kirchen (in German), Würzburg: Echter Verlag, ISBN 3-429-01186-8
- Kath. Pfarramt; Maria Himmelfahrt; Johannes Port (1989), Der Kalvarienberg zu Wettenhausen. Gebete und Geschichte einer altehrwürdigen Wallfahrtsstätte (in German), Kammeltal: s. n.

French:

- Yves-Pascal Castel (1997), Croix et calvaires en Bretagne. = Kroaziou ha kalvarihou or bro (in French), Trelevenez: Minihi levenez, ISBN 2-908230-09-7 – also in the Breton language
- Marc Déceneux (2001), La Bretagne des enclos et des calvaires (in French), Rennes: Ouest-France, ISBN 2-7373-2261-8 – Mémoires de l'histoire
- Yannick Pelletier (1996), Les enclos Paroissiaux de Bretagne (in French), Paris: Gisserot – Les universels Gisserot 13, ZDB-ID 2216999-4
