= Álvaro of Córdoba =

Álvaro of Córdoba may refer to:

- Paul Albar, also known as Álvaro of Córdoba (c. 800–861), Spanish scholar, poet and theologian
- Álvaro of Córdoba (Dominican) (1350–1430), Spanish priest and saint
