= Kalwaria Panewnicka =

Complex of chapels in Katowice, Poland

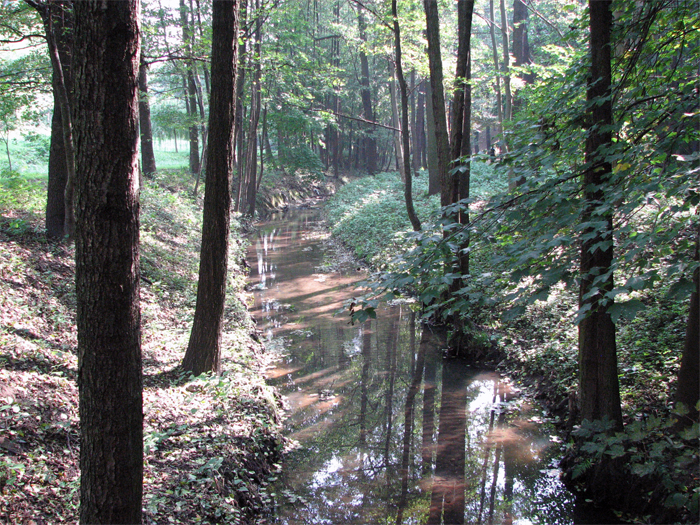
- Riparian forest near the Kłodnica river at Kalwaria Panewnicka

- Location within Poland
- Location: Katowice; Poland
- Coordinates: 50°13′45″N 18°57′57″E
- Area: 8 ha (20 acres)
- Created: 1909

Kalwaria Panewnicka is a complex of chapels located near the Franciscan monastery in Katowice, along with the adjacent park area.

The 8-hectare site, owned by the Franciscans of the Province of the Assumption of the Blessed Virgin Mary in Katowice, is enclosed by a brick wall. Within Kalwaria Panewnicka, alongside the Stations of the Cross, there are rosary chapels and the oldest place of worship on the site – the replica of the Massabielle Grotto, built in 1905. Masses are held there during the summer, as well as May devotions to the Blessed Virgin Mary. Asphalt paths connect the various chapels, and the Kłodnica river flows through the site, crossed by four bridges. Kalwaria Panewnicka is also home to a century-old forest stand. Visitors can access the site by passing next to the monastery on Panewnicka Street or through gates from Związkowa and Franciszkańska streets.

Kalwaria Panewnicka is a site for outdoor Stations of the Cross services, especially during Lent. It is also the venue for Passion Plays ("Śląska Kalwaria") and the Ecological Song Festival, Ekosong.

== History ==
After the completion of the Panewniki Basilica in 1908, preparations for the construction of the calvary began the following year. In 1909, the terrain was drained and marked for the future chapel locations, with wooden posts and images of the Stations of the Cross placed to indicate the spots. In 1911, capsules with stones from the Holy Land, brought by Father Władysław Schneider, were hung on the posts. The stations were blessed by Father Wilhelm Rogosz on 16 July 1911, with the first three wooden crosses set up two days earlier. Metal figures of Christ and the thieves, made in Cologne, were installed on the crosses on 4 April 1912. During these years, deciduous trees were also planted on the site. Before World War I, two designs for the chapels were created by Maximilian Sliwka from Zabrze and P. Schreiner from Regensburg.

However, the decision to proceed with the construction was made only after Poland regained independence. In 1936, Provincial Father Michał Porada, along with Fathers Wilhelm Rogosz and Karol Bik-Dzieszowski, announced a competition for the design of the chapels, aiming to move away from the original German designs. The competition was won by architects Jan Krug and Tadeusz Brzoza from Lviv, who chose a neo-Romanesque style with experimental solutions blending functionalism and modernism. Several artists, including Xawery Dunikowski, Antoni Michalak, Antoni Mehl, and Marian Wnuk, were invited to collaborate. Construction, led by Father Karol Bik, was interrupted by World War II. By the time the war broke out, most of the chapels were already built, though finishing touches were still needed, and work on Station X had not yet begun.

During the Polish People's Republic era, Father Innocenty Glensk and Father Norbert Chudoba were responsible for the continued construction. Despite numerous difficulties, work was completed by 1953. Soon after, the construction of 15 rosary chapels began. The stations were designed by architects Andrzej Mastej and Stanisław Sepioła. The turning point came in 1954, when the Panewniki church was granted the title of the Assumption of Mary and the monastery complex was designated as a shrine to Mary. The joyful chapels with sculptures by Karol Muszkiet were consecrated by Bishop Herbert Bednorz on 24 November 1957. The sorrowful chapels were consecrated by the same bishop on 4 October 1959, with sculptures by S. Białek, F. Józefowicz, and Bronisław Koniuszy from Kraków. The glorious chapels were consecrated by Bishop Bednorz on 22 September 1963. Maiolica bas-reliefs for these chapels were created by Kraków artists Grażyna Borkowska-Niemojewska, Ewa Żygulska, and Janina Kluziewicz-Karbowska. In 1964, work began on the Chapel of St. Raphael the Archangel, patron of pilgrims, but due to a lack of government approval, the construction was halted.

== Stations of the Cross ==
The layout of Kalwaria Panewnicka was indirectly inspired by the topography of shrines in Jerusalem, incorporating features like the placement of the final Stations of the Cross on an elevation and a bridge over the Cedron Stream. The builders, guided by the vision of Father Władysław Schneider – a long-time missionary in Palestine and contributor to earlier Kalwaria Piekarska – drew inspiration from well-known Franciscan-associated calvaries, such as Kalwaria Zebrzydowska and Góra Świętej Anny. However, Kalwaria Panewnicka omitted some traditional elements, such as a replica of the Holy Sepulchre modeled after the Jerusalem tomb and the Chapel of Jesus' Descent into the Cedron, both of which exist in Kalwaria Zebrzydowska and Góra Świętej Anny. Furthermore, the medieval practice of adhering to Jerusalem distances, popularized by Christian van Adrichem, was not implemented here. Kalwaria Panewnicka comprises a total of 12 chapels:

- Station I: Jesus is Condemned to Death – built in 1938 with contributions from the residents of Ligota. The external Ecce Homo sandstone sculpture was crafted by Marian Wnuk, while the interior featured a painting of Christ before Pilate by Antoni Michalak (1937). Since 1956, the gradus (steps) have housed relics of St. Justin Martyr.
- Station II: Jesus Takes the Cross on His Shoulders – completed in 1948, the chapel contains a concrete statue of Christ carrying the cross, created by Father Leonard Bannert.
- Station III: Jesus Falls for the First Time – completed in 1947, the chapel features a sculpture of Christ kneeling, crafted by Edward Czuch from Bytom.
- Station IV: Jesus Meets His Mother – construction began in 1938 and was finished in 1950. Father Leonard Bannert sculpted the figures of Christ and the Virgin Mary in artificial stone.
- Station V: Simon of Cyrene Helps Jesus Carry the Cross – built and consecrated in 1939, funded by workers of the Baildon Steelworks. Marian Wnuk from Lviv sculpted the scene. The chapel also serves as a funeral chapel for monks.
- Station VI: Veronica Wipes the Face of Jesus – consecrated on 4 September 1938, funded by Catholic associations of the Panewniki church. The Pińczów limestone sculpture was made by Marian Wnuk.
- Station VII: Jesus Falls for the Second Time – consecrated on 4 September 1938, funded by Panewniki parishioners. The stone for the chapel came from Katowice's slag heap. Sculptures were made by Antoni Mehl from Kraków. In 1984, a podium was added. The chapel also serves as a field altar.
- Station VIII: Jesus Consoles the Women of Jerusalem – construction began before World War II and was completed in 1950. The sculptures were created by Father Leonard Bannert.
- Station IX: Jesus Falls for the Third Time – completed in 1952. The chapel's protective grating was added in 1983.
- Station X: Jesus is Stripped of His Garments – completed in 1950. The figures of Christ and the executioner were sculpted by Angelina Jury-Petrucco from Załęże.
- Crucifixion Chapel (Stations XI–XIII) – this chapel memorializes the events of Jesus being nailed to the cross, dying on the cross, and being taken down from the cross. Designed by Jan Krug and Tadeusz Brzoza, its interior rotunda has a diameter of 12 m. Construction was completed in 1948, with polychromes by Edward Daniel Czuch. The chapel was consecrated on 5 August 1951. It was originally funded by the Katowice municipal government and later served as the academic chapel for the Franciscan Academic Pastoral Center (1968–2009).
- Station XIV: Jesus is Laid in the Tomb – the sculpture was crafted by Father Leonard Bannert in 1953, with protective grating added in 1983.
Stations of the Cross

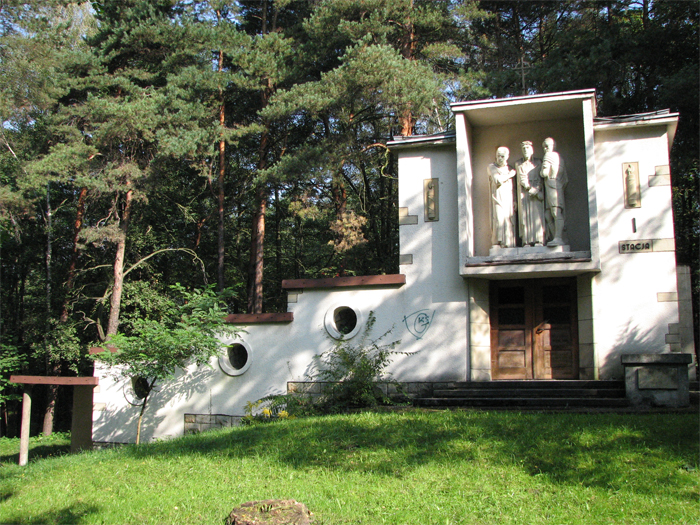
Station I

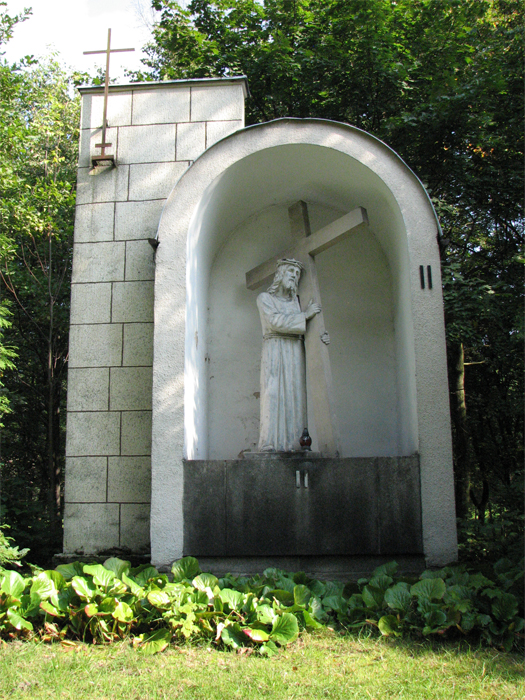
Station II

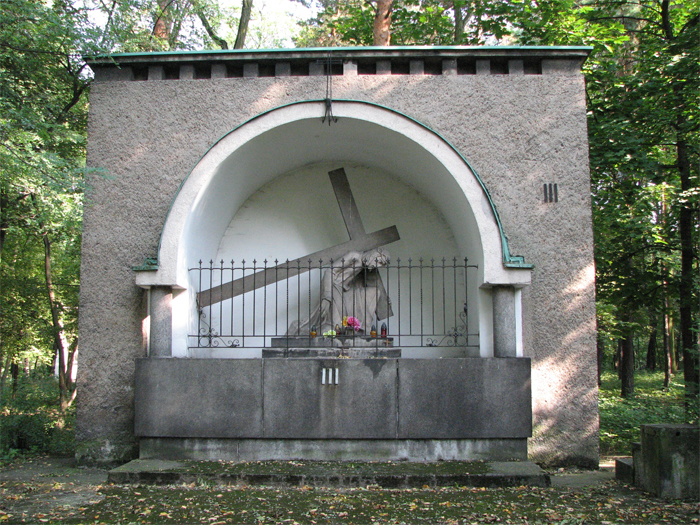
Station III

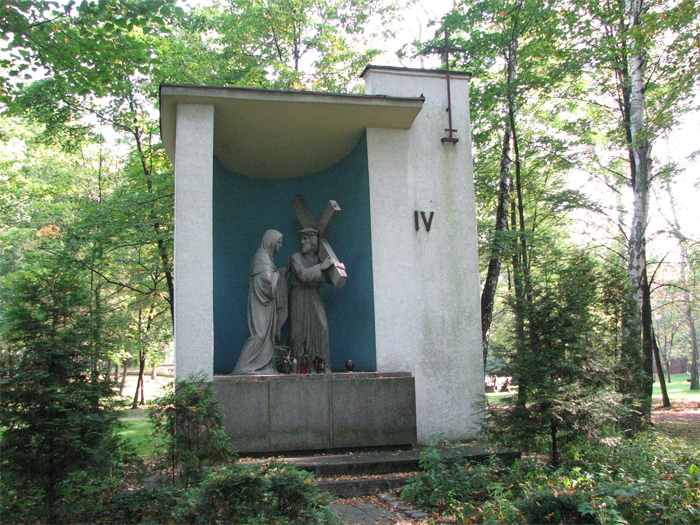
Station IV

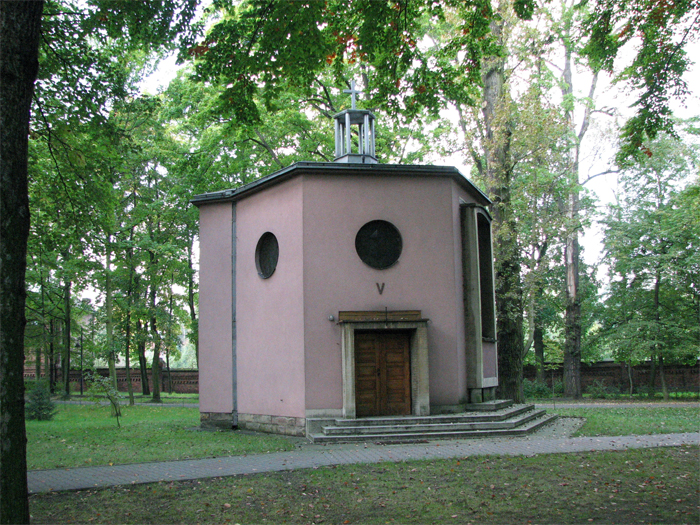
Station V

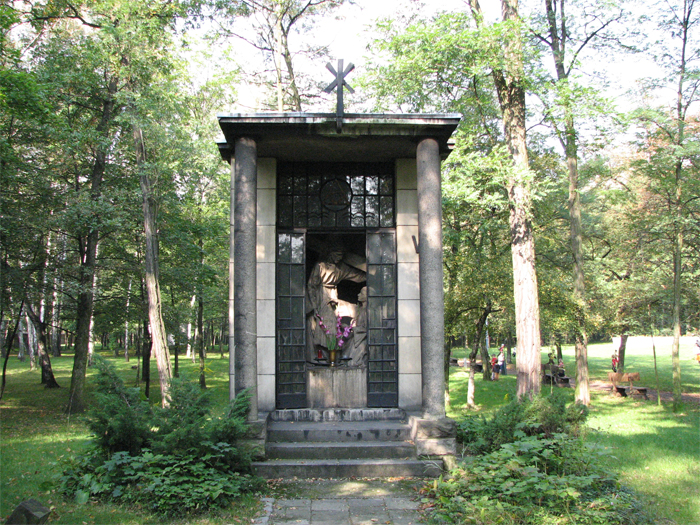
Station VI

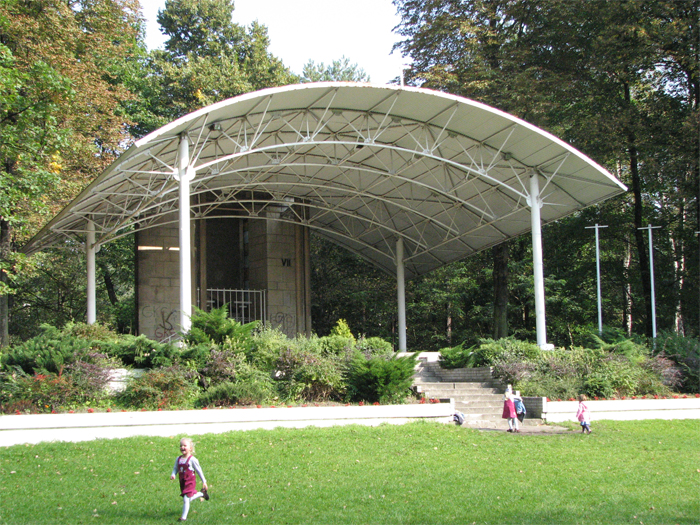
Station VII

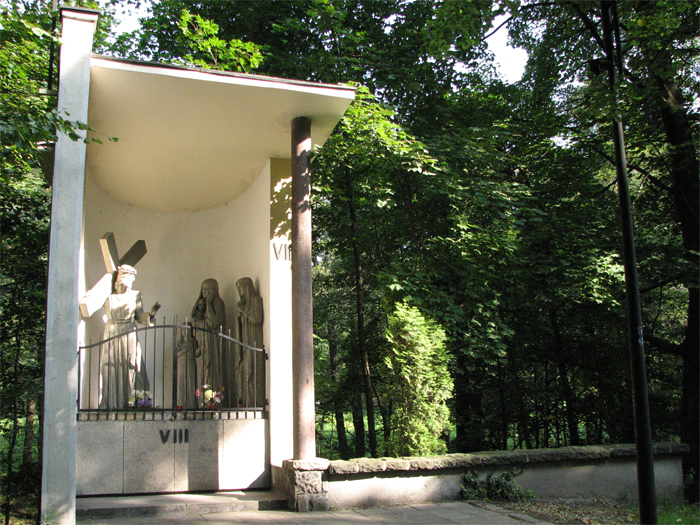
Station VIII

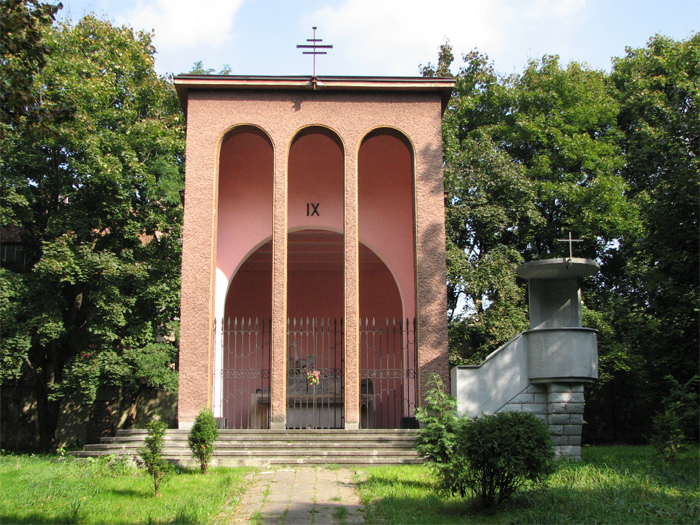
Station IX

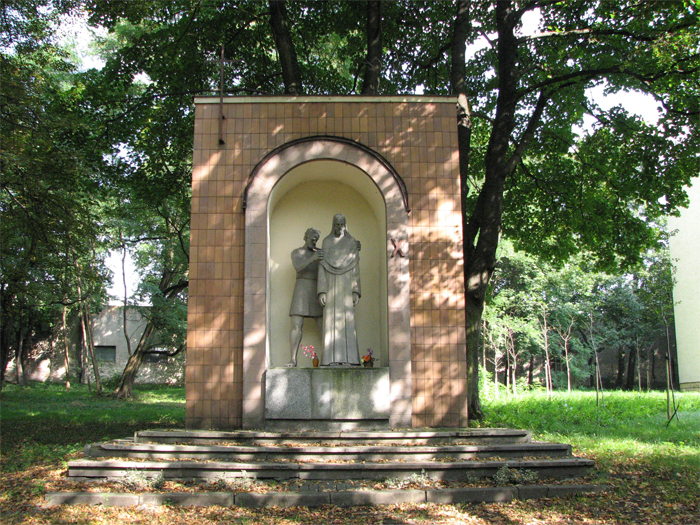
Station X

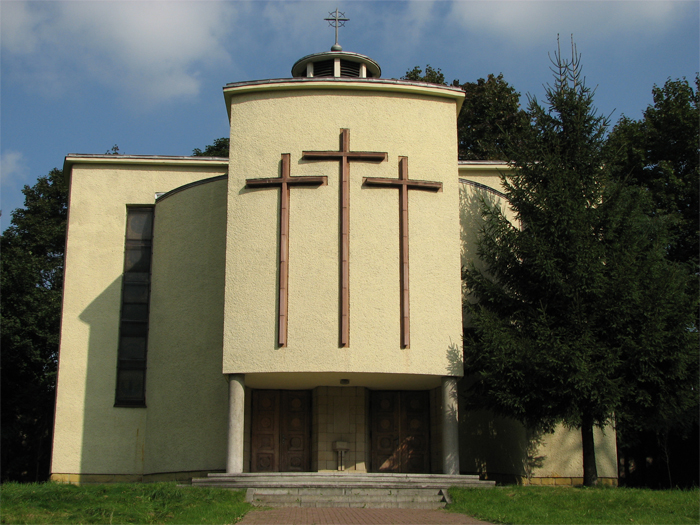
Stations XI–XIII

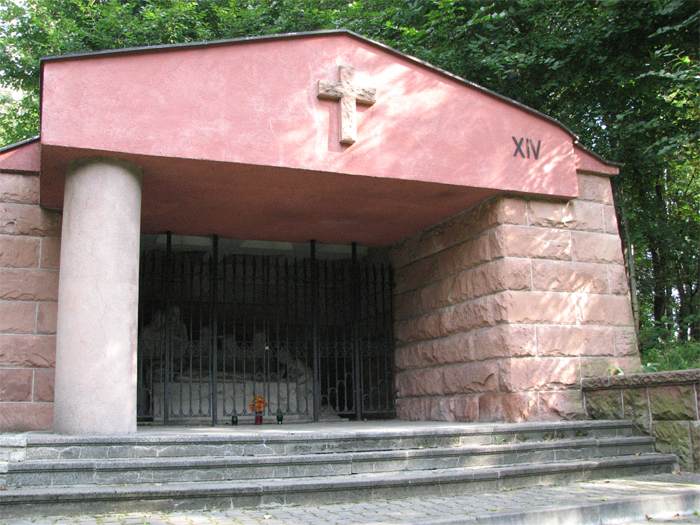
Station XIV

== Rosary chapels ==
The ensemble of rosary chapels at Kalwaria Panewnicka was completed and consecrated in 1963, predating Pope John Paul II's Rosarium Virginis Mariae (16 October 2002), which introduced the Luminous Mysteries to the traditional rosary. Currently, Kalwaria Panewnicka features 15 chapels representing the Joyful, Sorrowful, and Glorious Mysteries. A project exists to add five missing chapels along the Kłodnica river to represent the Luminous Mysteries. The 15 existing rosary chapels are:

- Joyful Mysteries:
  - Annunciation Chapel (1956) – depicts Archangel Gabriel kneeling before Mary.
  - Visitation Chapel (1956) – illustrates the meeting of the Virgin Mary and St. Elizabeth.
  - Nativity Chapel (1957) – displays the Nativity scene.
  - Presentation of the Lord Chapel (1957) – features the Virgin Mary and Simeon holding the Christ Child.
  - Finding of the Child Jesus in the Temple Chapel (1957) – represents Mary and Jesus among Jewish priests.
- Sorrowful Mysteries:
  - Gethsemane Chapel (1958) – funded by Klara Rzychoń, depicts Christ kneeling with his disciples in the Garden of Gethsemane.
  - Scourging Chapel (1958) – contains a painting of Jesus Tortured in the House of Caiaphas.
  - Crowning with Thorns Chapel – displays Christ wearing a crown of thorns. Barbed wire evokes the suffering in the World War II concentration camps and Soviet gulags.
  - Carrying of the Cross Chapel – features a sculpture of Christ carrying the cross, surrounded by tormentors.
  - Crucifixion Chapel (1911) – includes figures of the Crucified Christ and the thieves, mounted on 10-meter reinforced concrete crosses.
- Glorious Mysteries:
  - Resurrection Chapel – depicts an angel at the entrance of the tomb and the three Marys.
  - Ascension Chapel – features symbolic footprints of Christ and a group of Apostles with Mary.
  - Descent of the Holy Spirit Chapel – illustrates the traditional scene in the Upper Room with the Holy Spirit in the form of a dove.
  - Assumption of Mary Chapel – displays a majolica sculpture of Mary. The wall includes depictions of Pope Pius XII, St. Bernard, St. Bonaventure, St. Anthony of Padua, and St. John the Evangelist.
  - Coronation of Mary Chapel – shows Mary elevated above the earth, with angels placing a crown on her head.
Rosary chapels

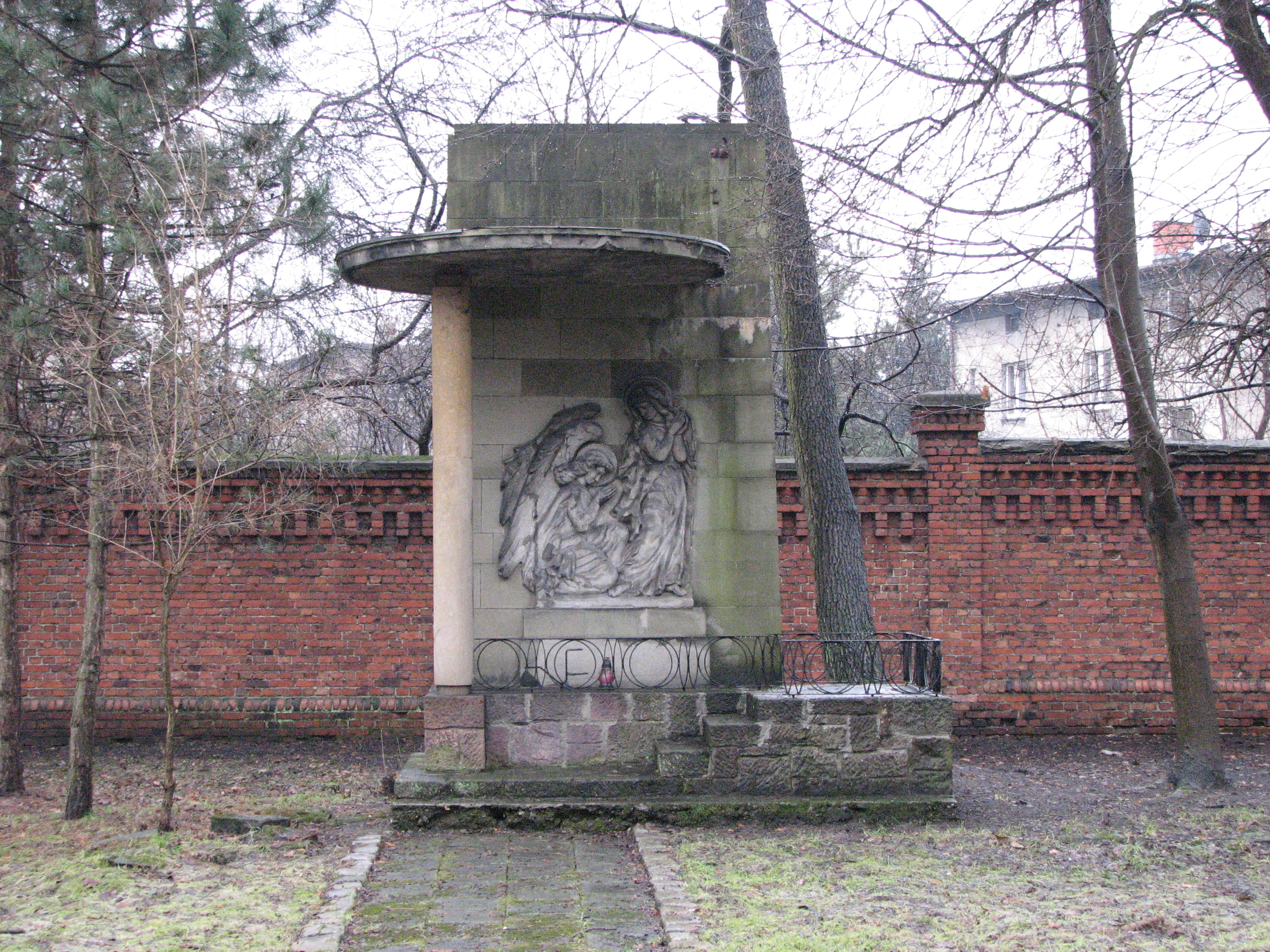
Annunciation

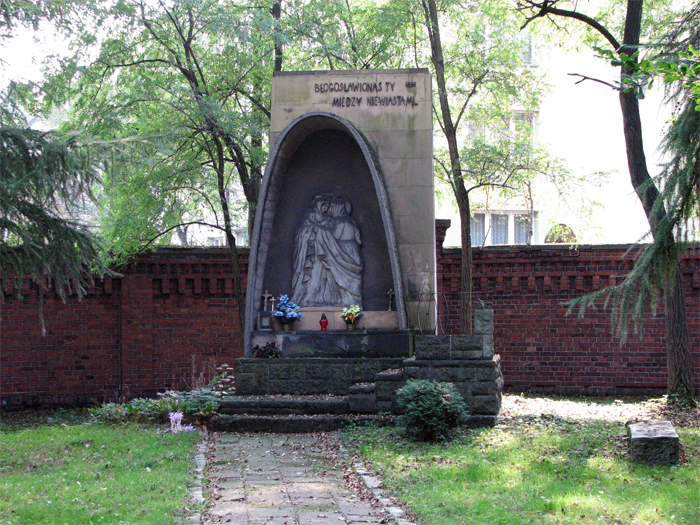
Visitation

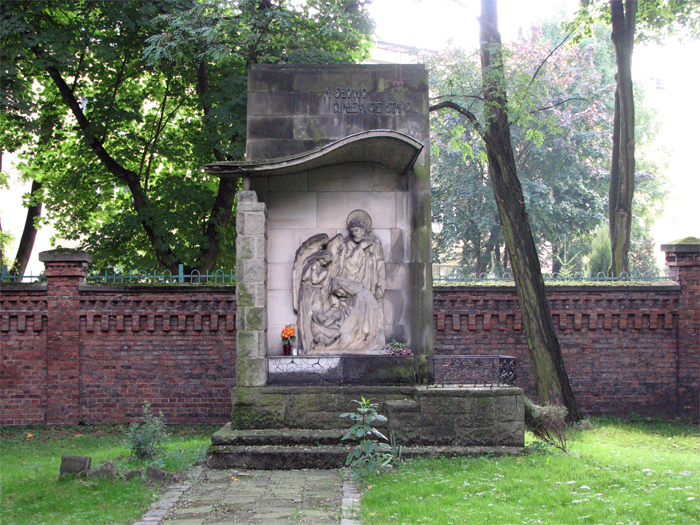
Nativity

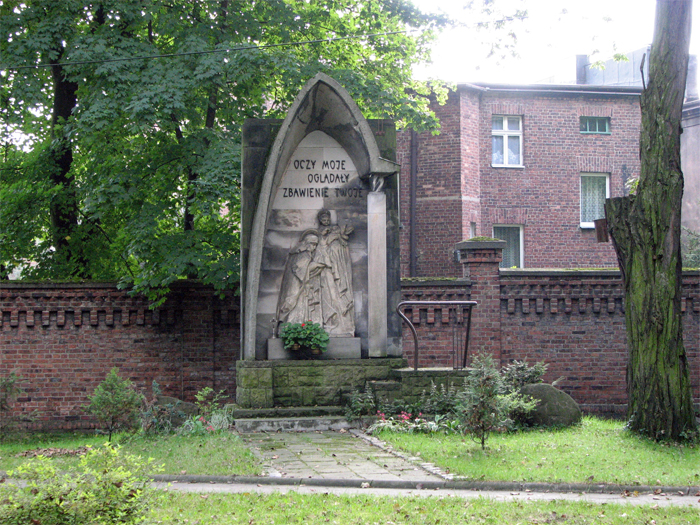
Presentation

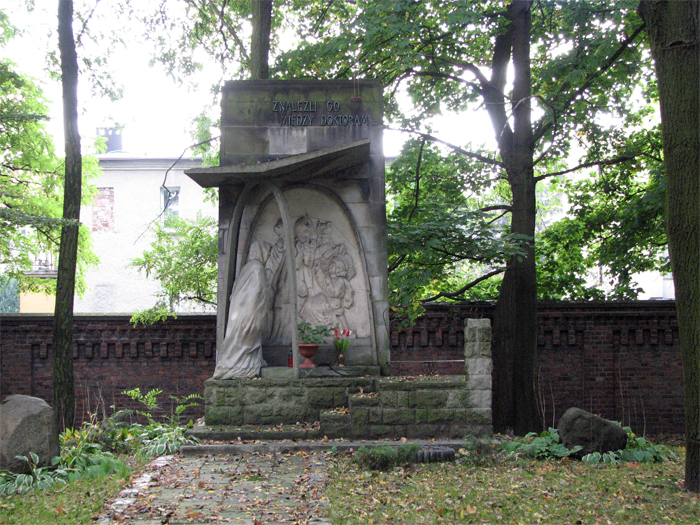
Finding in the Temple

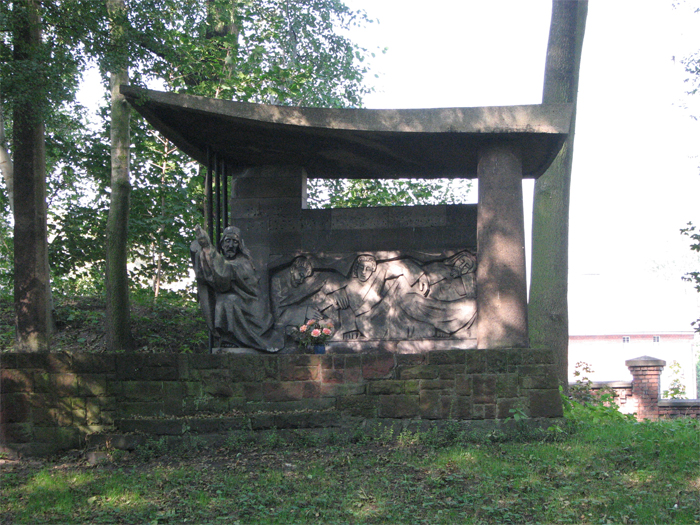
Agony in the Garden

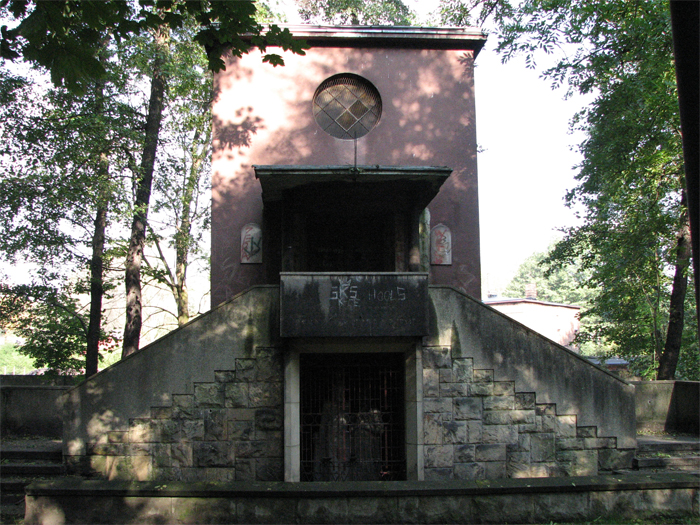
Scourging

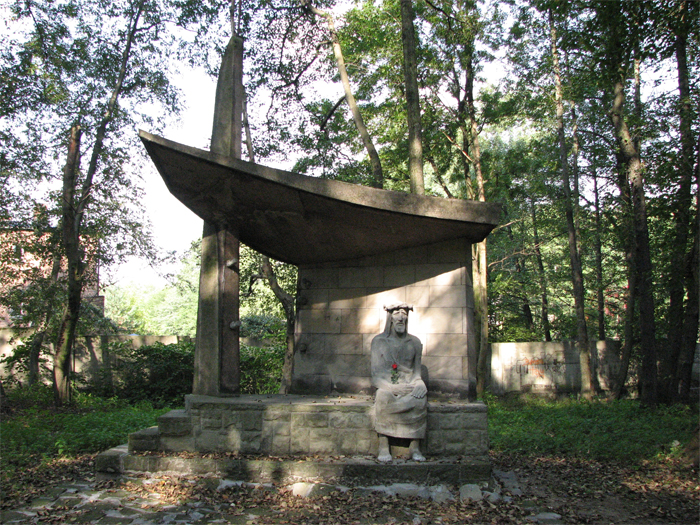
Crowning with Thorns

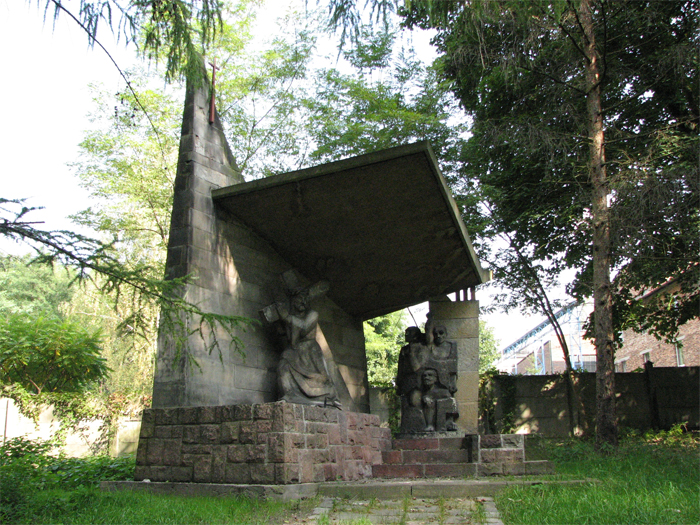
Carrying of the Cross

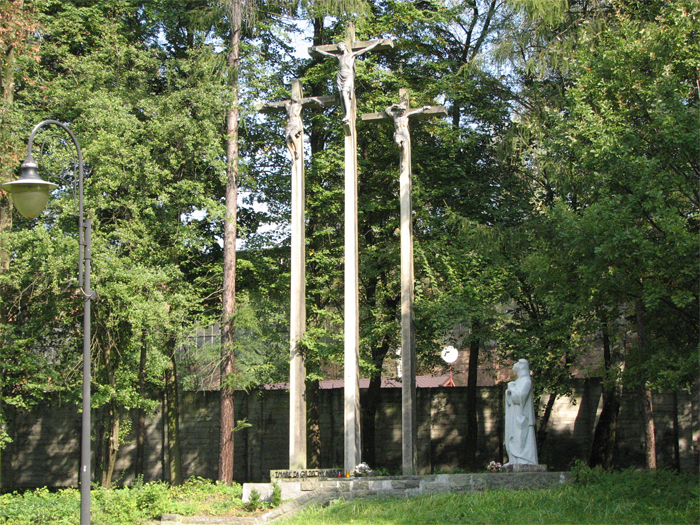
Crucifixion

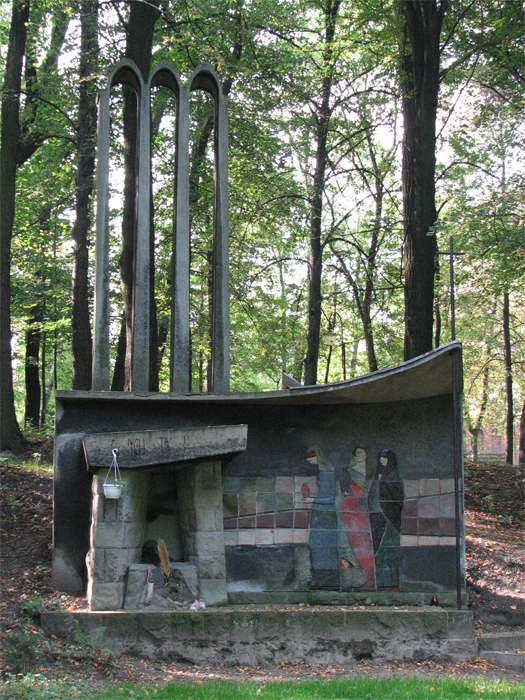
Resurrection

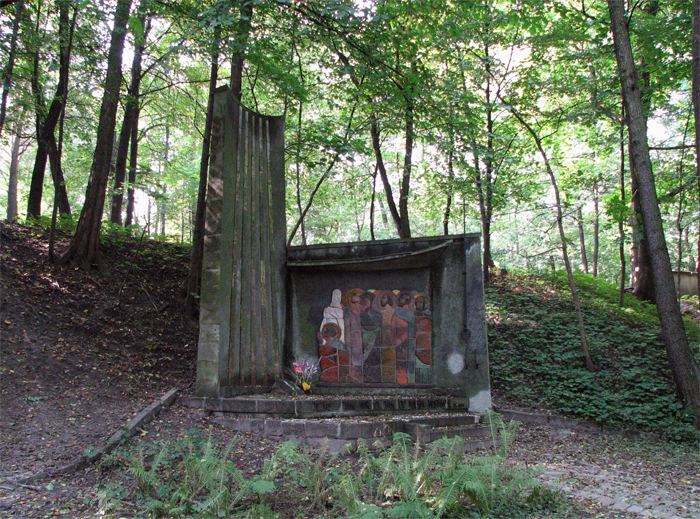
Ascension

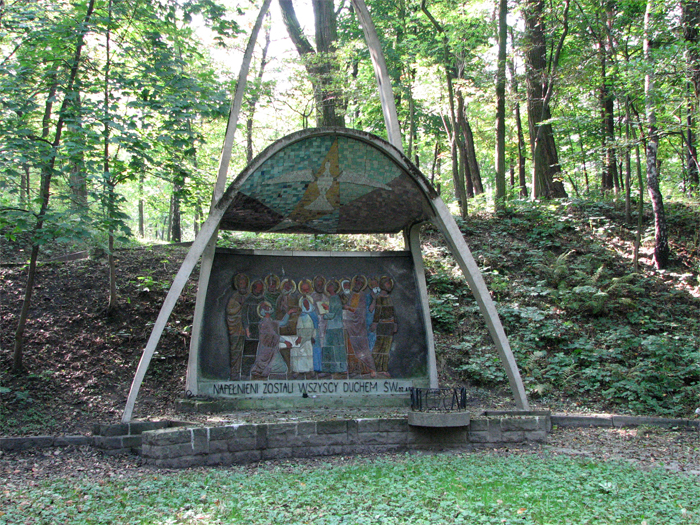
Descent of the Holy Spirit

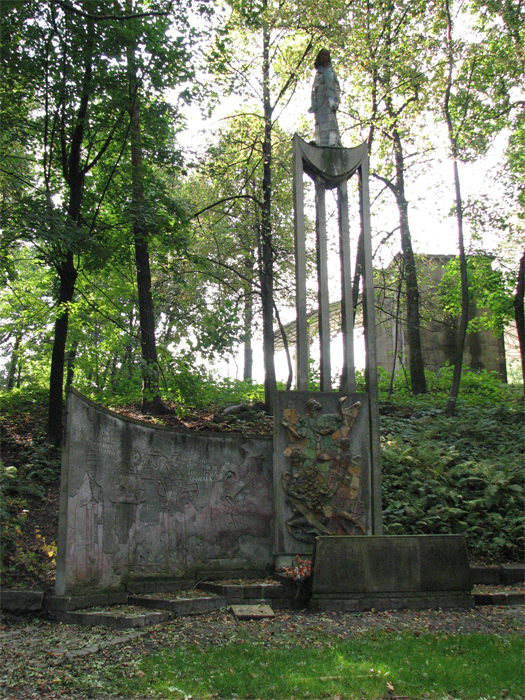
Assumption of the Virgin Mary

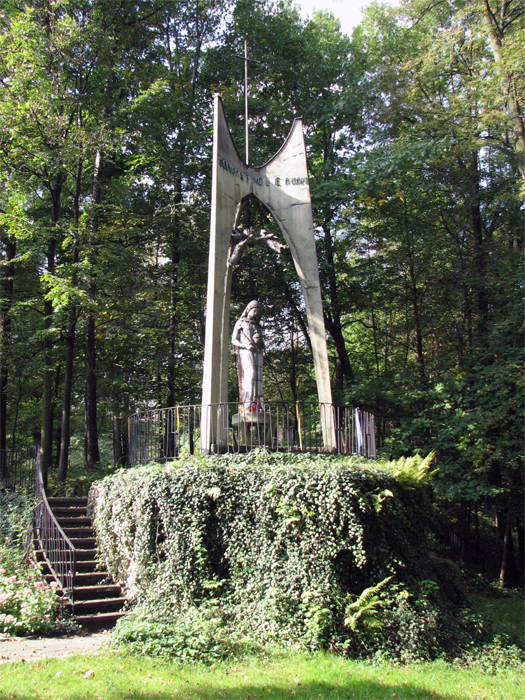
Coronation of the Virgin Mary

== Forest stand ==
Trees were planted immediately after the completion of the basilica and monastery in 1909. The calvary area hosts a variety of trees, including Norway maples, sycamores, small-leaved lindens, silver birches, black locusts, common alders (some of considerable size), pedunculate oaks, rowans, poplars, larches, and pines. A fragment of ash-alder riparian forest has been preserved along the Kłodnica river. In the western section, a pedunculate oak with a circumference of 3.55 meters grows.

Between 2002 and 2005, approximately 400 new trees were planted on the calvary grounds.
