= Aggsbach Charterhouse =

Monastery in Aggsbach Dorf, Austria

Coordinates: 48°17′38″N 15°25′28″E

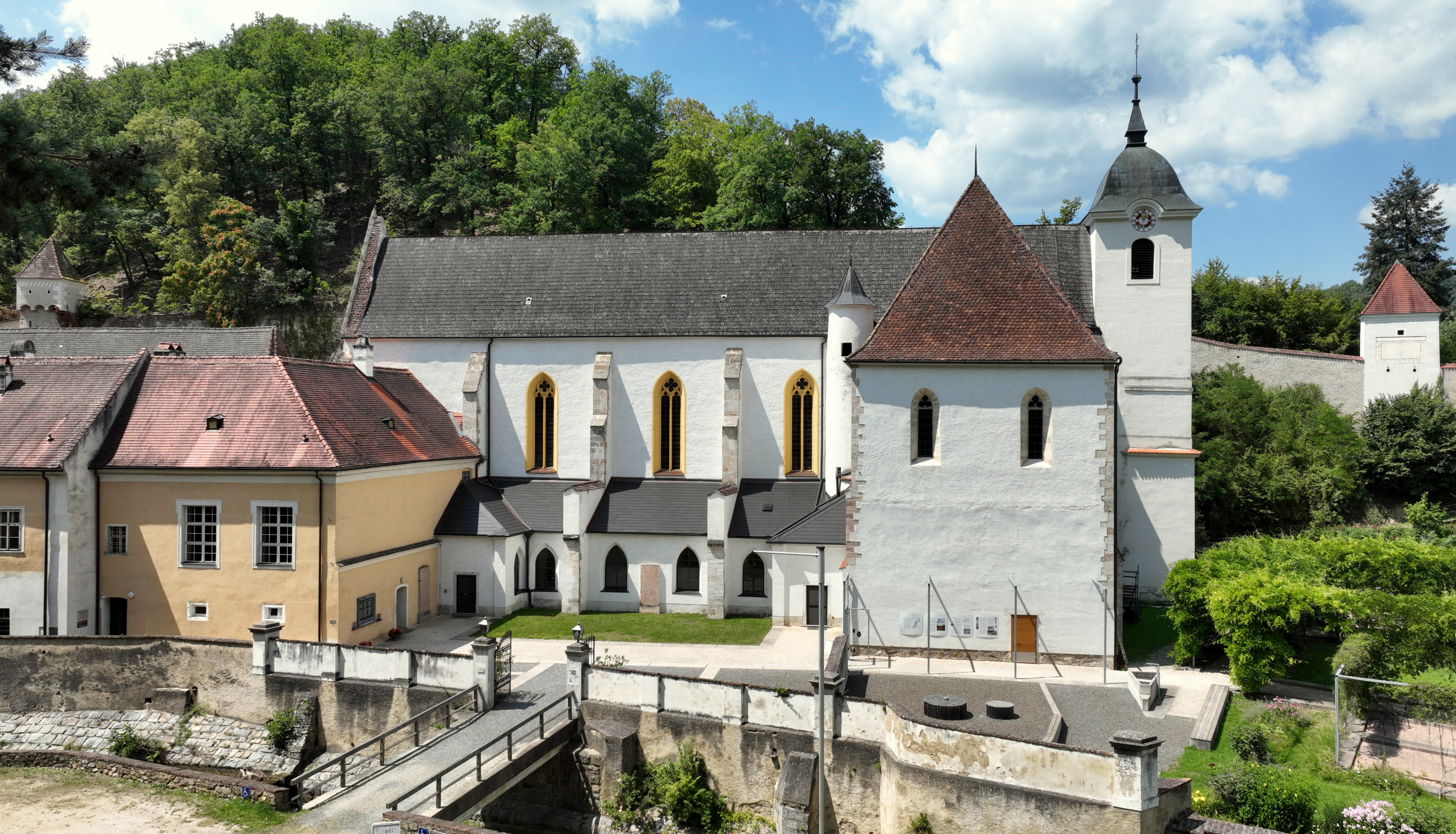
Parish church of Aggsbach Dorf, formerly the church of Aggsbach Charterhouse

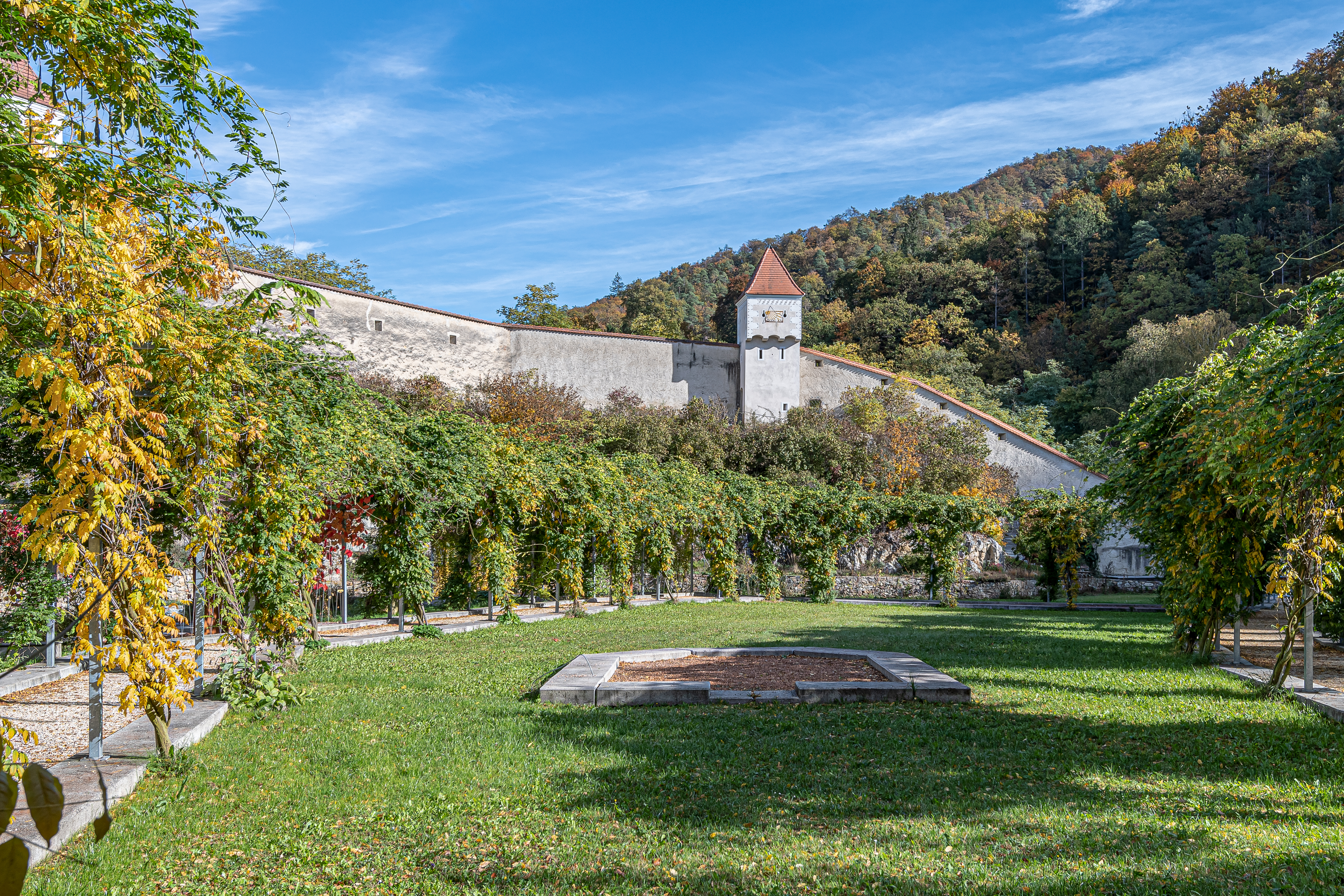
Meditation garden within the monastery

Aggsbach Charterhouse (German: Kartause Aggsbach) is a former Carthusian monastery, or charterhouse, located in Aggsbach Dorf in Schönbühel-Aggsbach in Lower Austria.

The monastery was founded in 1380 by Heidenreich von Maissau. It was dissolved in 1782 in the reforms of Emperor Joseph II. The premises were mostly converted for use as a castle, except for a few portions which were incorporated into the parish priest's farm. The monks' cells and the cloister were demolished.

The Carthusian church, with the addition of a tower, remains as the parish church.

== Sources and external links ==
- Verein der Freunde der Kartause Aggsbach (Friends of Aggsbach Charterhouse) (in German)
- Aggsbach Dorf parish website: photos of the former Carthusian church (in German)
- Aggsbach Dorf parish website: further information (in German)
- Monasterium.net: Kartause Aggsbach (in German)
