= San Vivaldo Monastery, Montaione =

Building in Montaione, Italy

Coordinates: 43°31′34″N 10°53′59″E

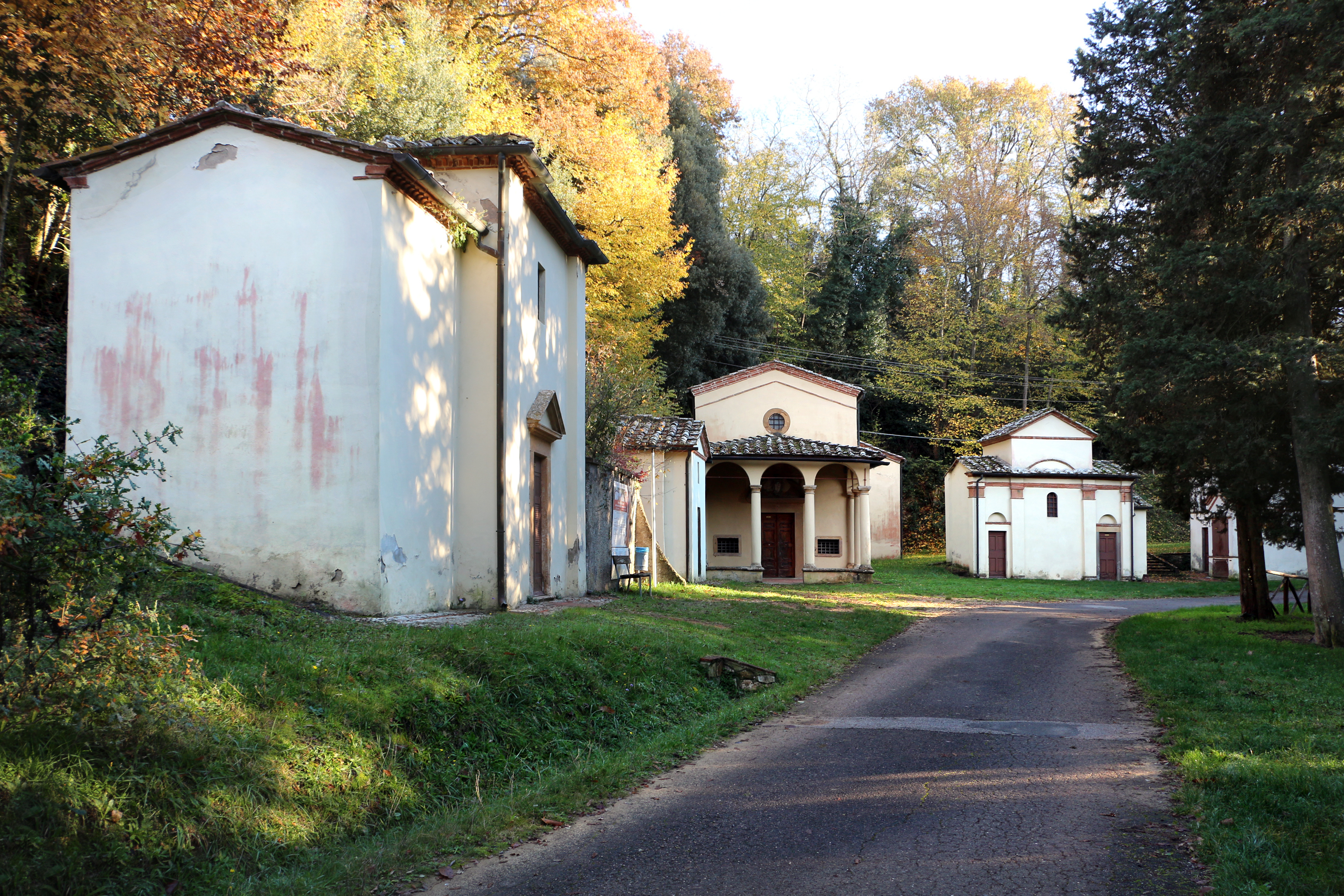
Some chapels of the "Sacro Monte"

San Vivaldo Monastery is a Roman Catholic convent, church, and sanctuary complex located outside of the town of Montaione, region of Tuscany, Italy. The eighteen distinct chapels on this hill, putatively corresponding to sites of the Holy Land, and containing vivid polychrome statuary groupings recalling events of the New Testament, specially the Passion of Jesus, are one of the few examples of the Sacri Monti complexes in Tuscany. Sacri Monti are more characteristic expressions of veneration in the Piedmont and Lombardy. The convent still houses the franciscan order.

== History ==
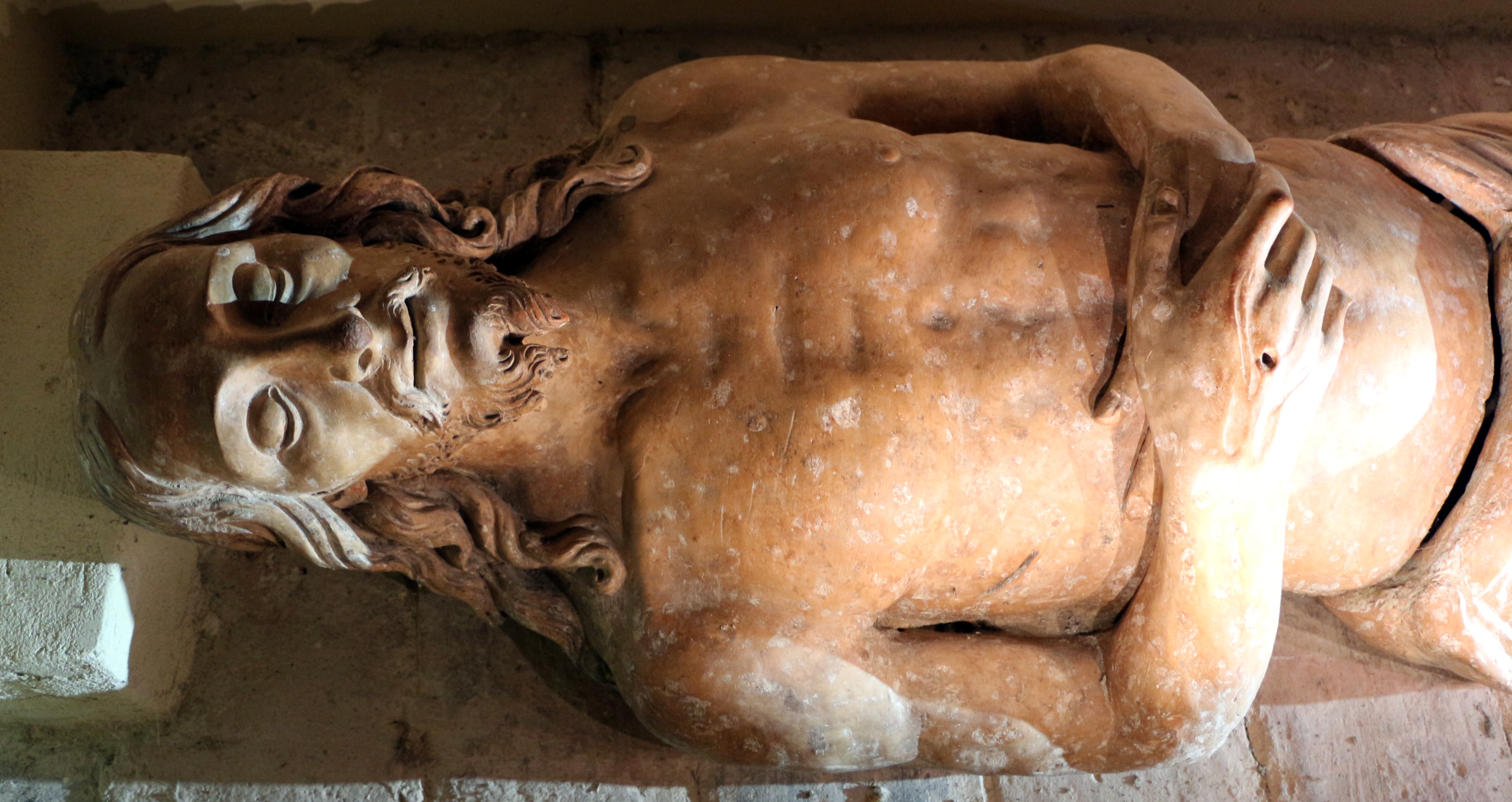
The dead body of Christ, attr. to Agnolo di Polo

The origins of San Vivaldo date the 1325, when a chapel was built at the site where the blessed Vivaldo, a Franciscan tertiary, had recently died. Located in a rural hillside, outside the town, the former hermitage site soon collected a monastery; and in 1326 to 1355, a church was built. In 1500, the arrival of the Franciscan Minor Friars to the site propelled the construction of the Sacro Monti, attempting to reproduce for the pilgrims, a replica of the topography of the holy places of Jerusalem, hence the site was also called the "Jerusalem of Tuscany". Franciscans were at the time intermediaries for arranging pilgrimages to the Holy Land, as well as custodians of the sites.

The friars planning the display chose the local geography places to represent Jerusalem landmarks, for example a small forest to represent the Valley of Josaphat, small hill to represent the Mount of Olives and Calvary, and a flat area to the north of the complex to place the chapel representing the Temple.

== Church ==
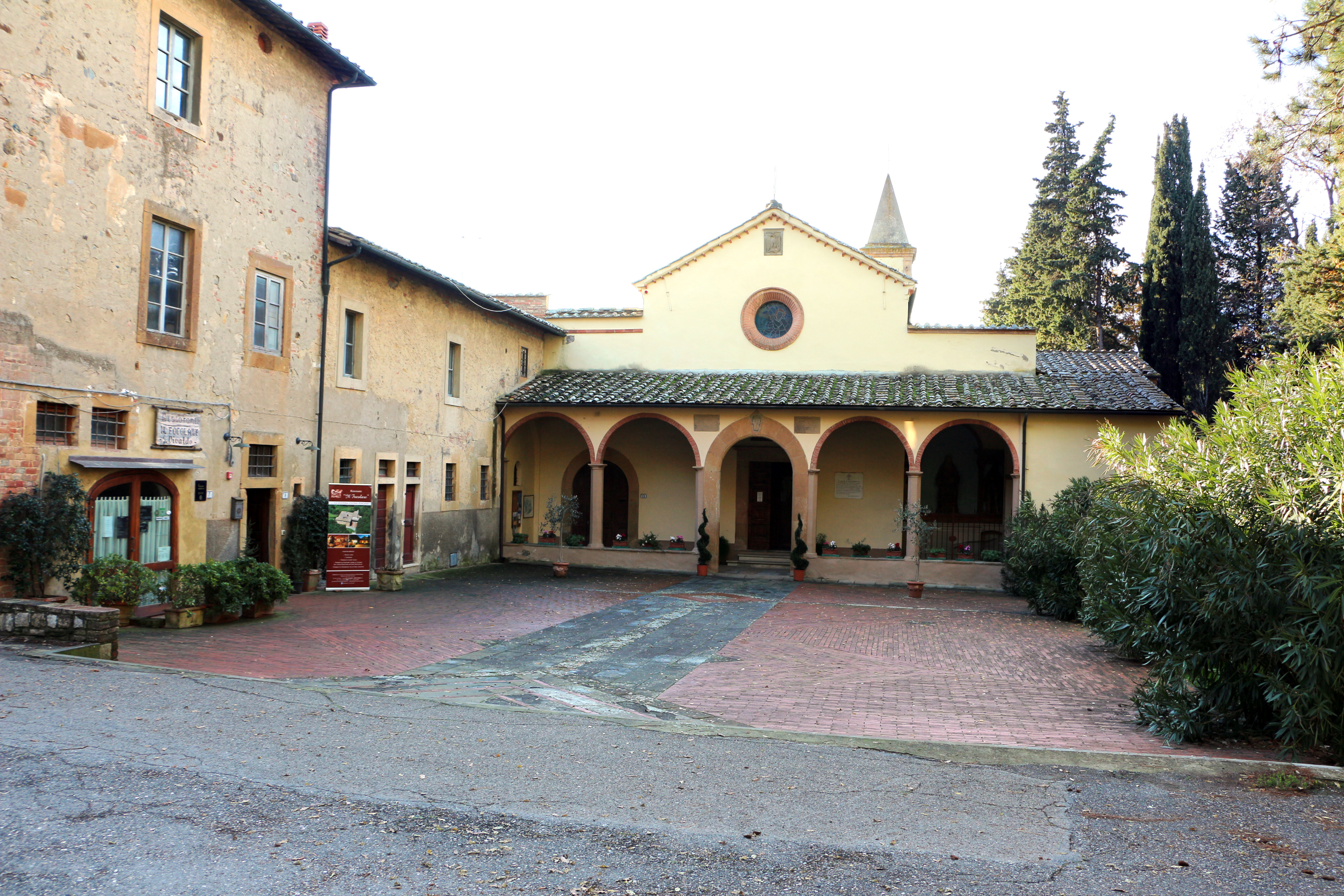
Facade of the Church of San Vivaldo

The church was erected at the site of an oak tree inside which Vivaldo was found dead. The church was refurbished in 1410. The first chapel on the right has the 15th-century reliquary and sepulchral urn of San Vivaldo. The chapel has a ceramic statue of St Catherine Alexandria and San Vivaldo by Benedetto Buglioni. The altarpiece depicting the Virgin in Glory with Saints John the Baptist, Jerome, Francis, and Vivaldo by Raffaellino del Garbo.

Through the church one enters the 14th-century chapel which was once the church of Santa Maria a Camporena at the site. The dome was decorated with frescoes honoring the Franciscan order, including a St Clare hastening the flight of Saracens attacking San Damiano. The organ, dating to 1736, was made by Francesco Domenico Calcioli from Lucca.

== Chapels ==
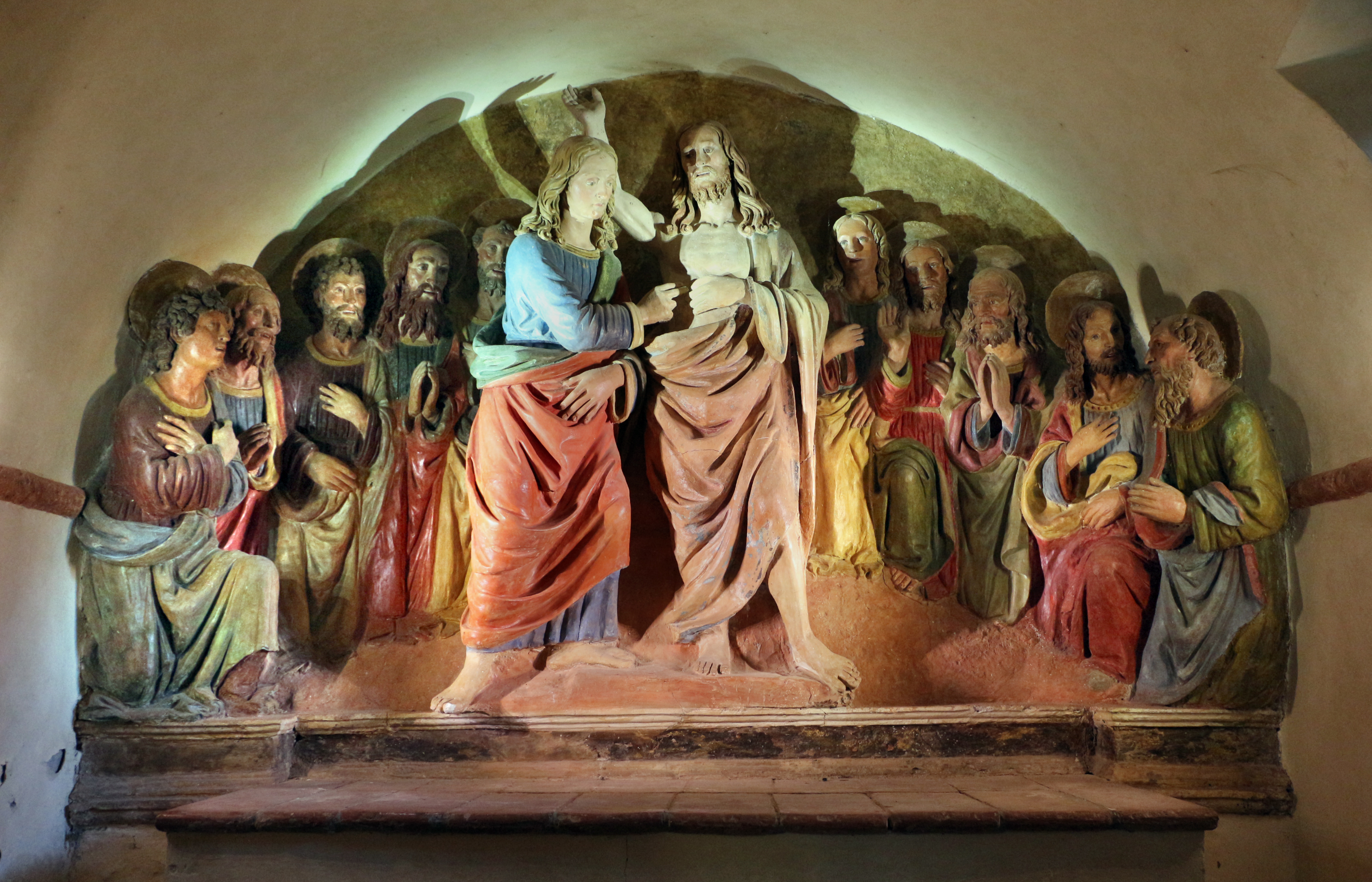
Disbelief of Saint Thomas, in one of the chapels

From 1500 to 1516, 25 chapels were erected at the site; of these 15 remain, and three were added in subsequent centuries. Not all the near-life size terra cotta groups date to the 16th century. Some of the work has been attributed to the Della Robbia studio. But most of the sculptors and painters remain unknown. Some of the statuary representation of the Passion depict the tormentors of Jesus as darkly pigmented Moors.
