= Álvaro of Córdoba (Dominican) =

Spanish Dominican friar and saint (c. 1350–1430)

Blessed Álvaro of Córdoba O.P.
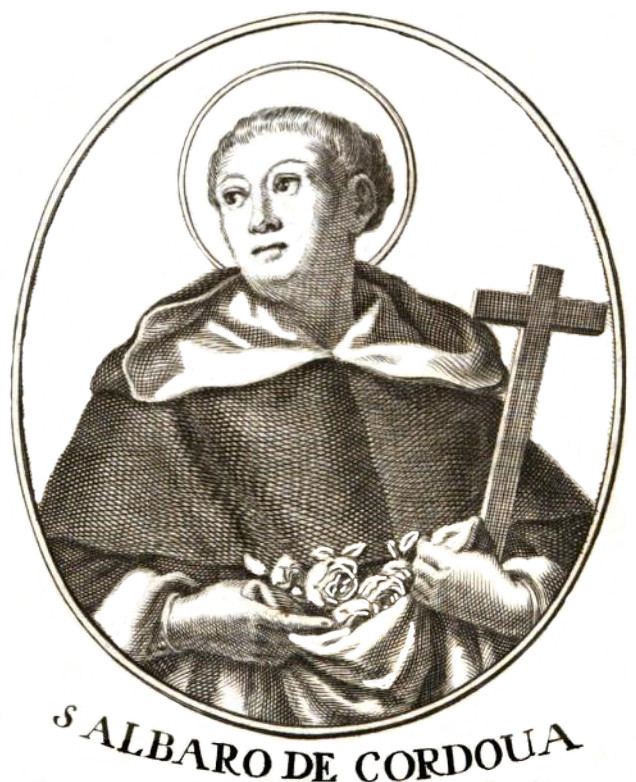

Priest
- Born: c. 1350; Zamora, Spain
- Died: 19 February 1430 (aged 80); Córdoba, Spain
- Venerated in: Roman Catholic Church
- Beatified: 22 September 1741, Saint Peter's Basilica, Papal States by Pope Benedict XIV
- Feast: 19 February
- Attributes: Dominican habit

Álvaro of Córdoba, OP (c.1350–c.1430) was a Spanish Dominican friar venerated in the Catholic Church. Born in Zamora, he entered the Order of Preachers in 1368 and preached throughout Spain and Italy.

He also established the priory of Scala Caeli in Córdoba, where he promoted the regular life. By his teachings on and contemplation of Jesus’ Passion, he spread the practice of the Way of the Cross throughout the West.

He died on 19 February 1430, and was beatified by Pope Benedict XIV in 1741.
