= Katowice =

- City county
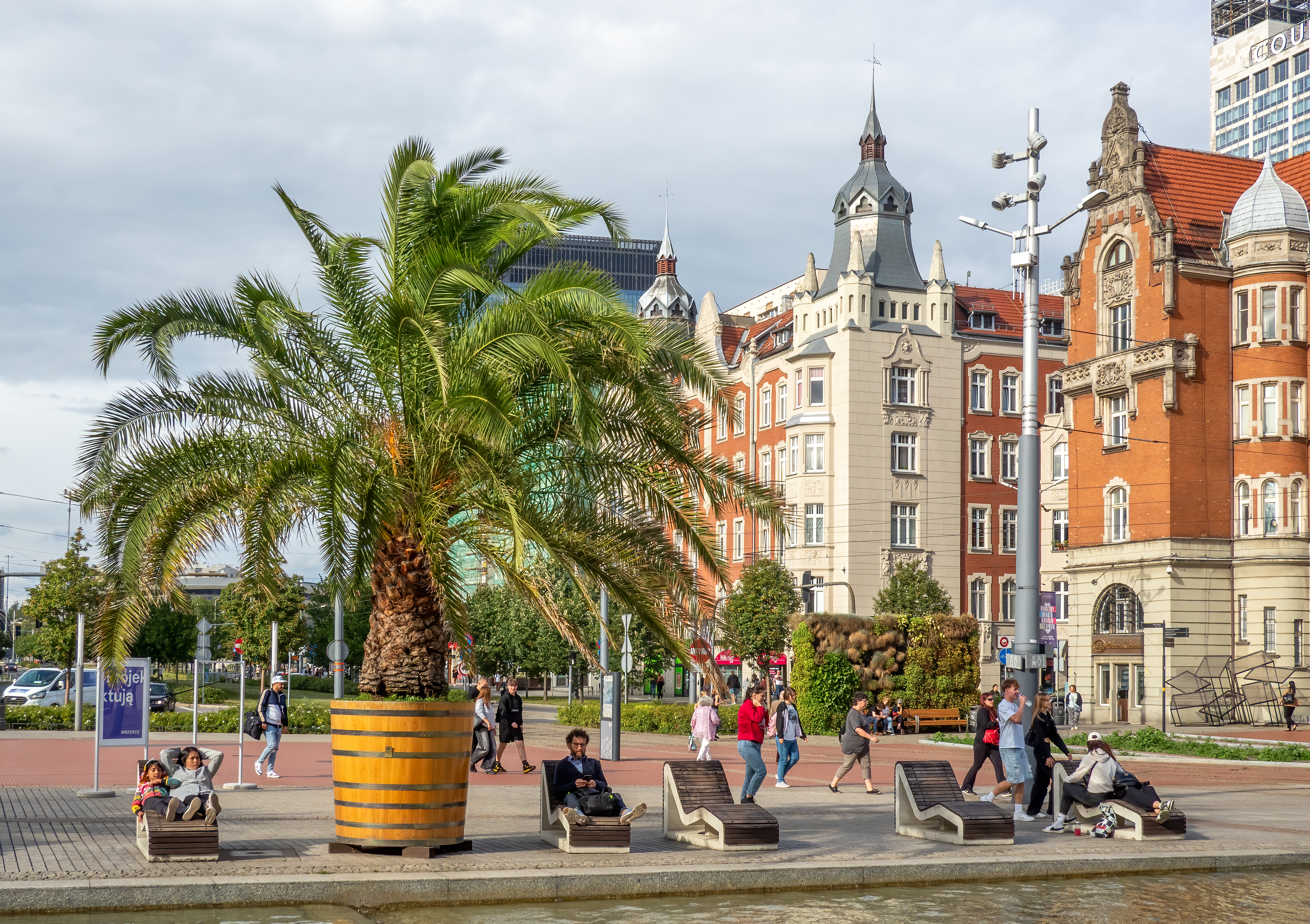
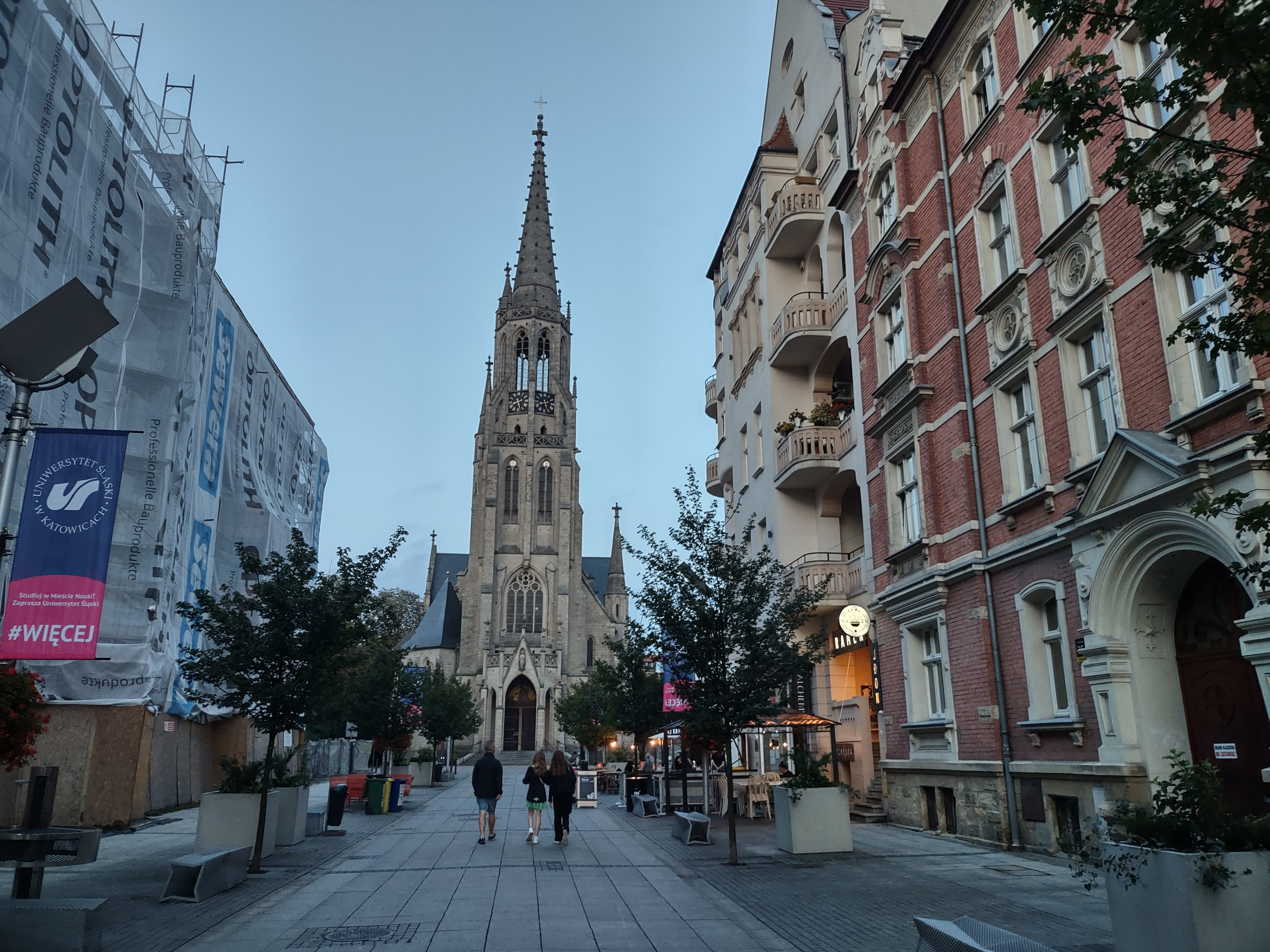
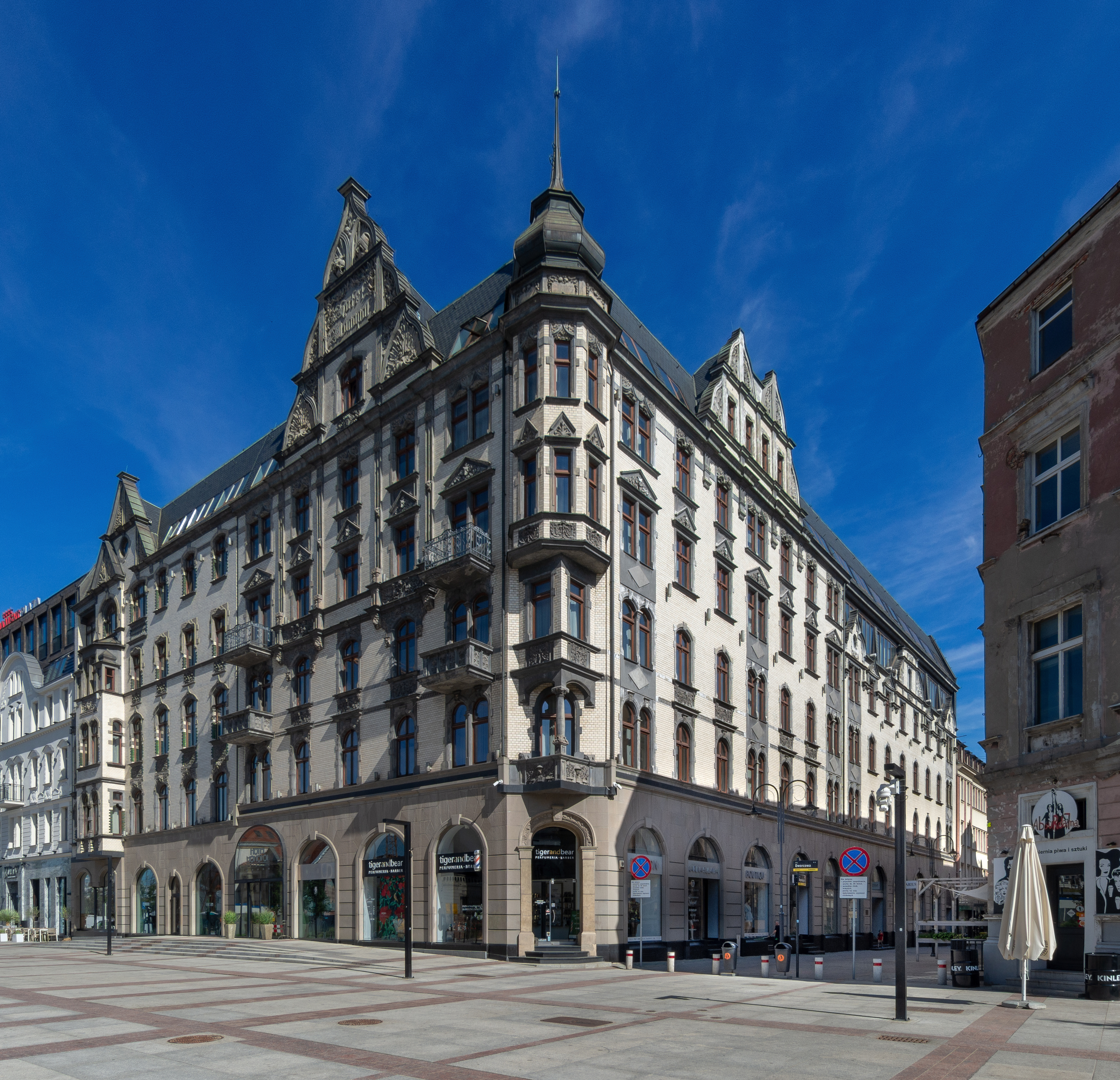
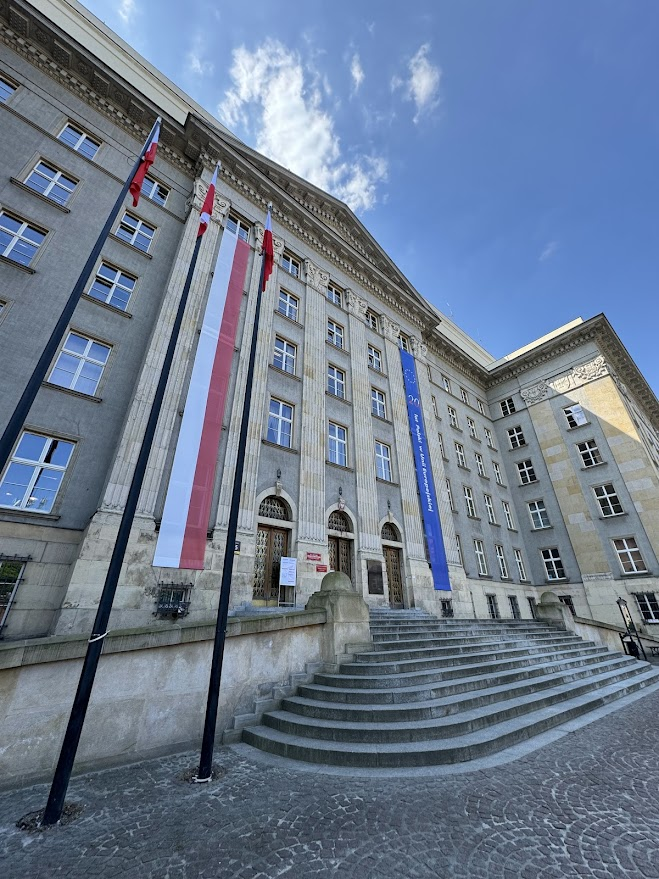
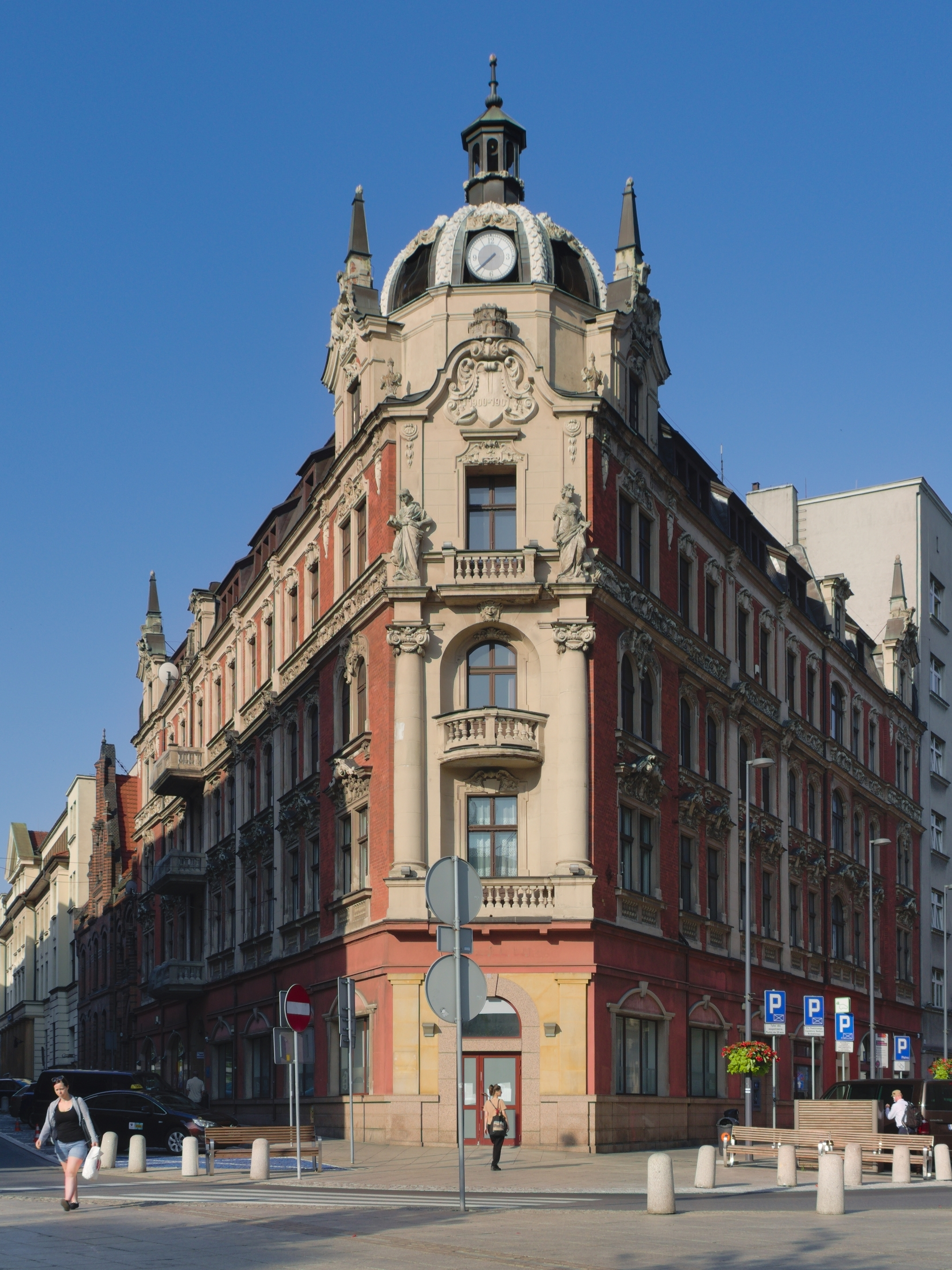
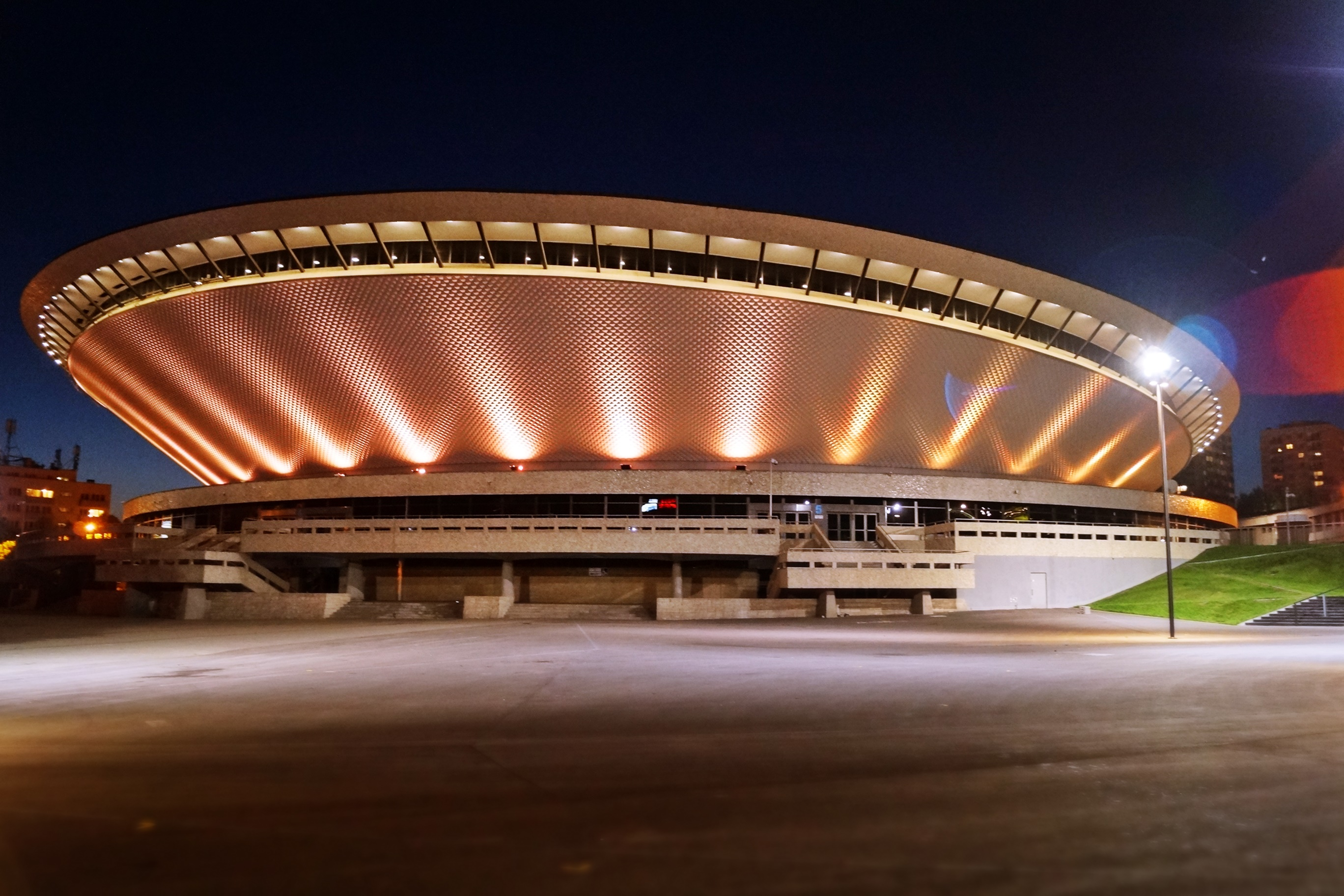
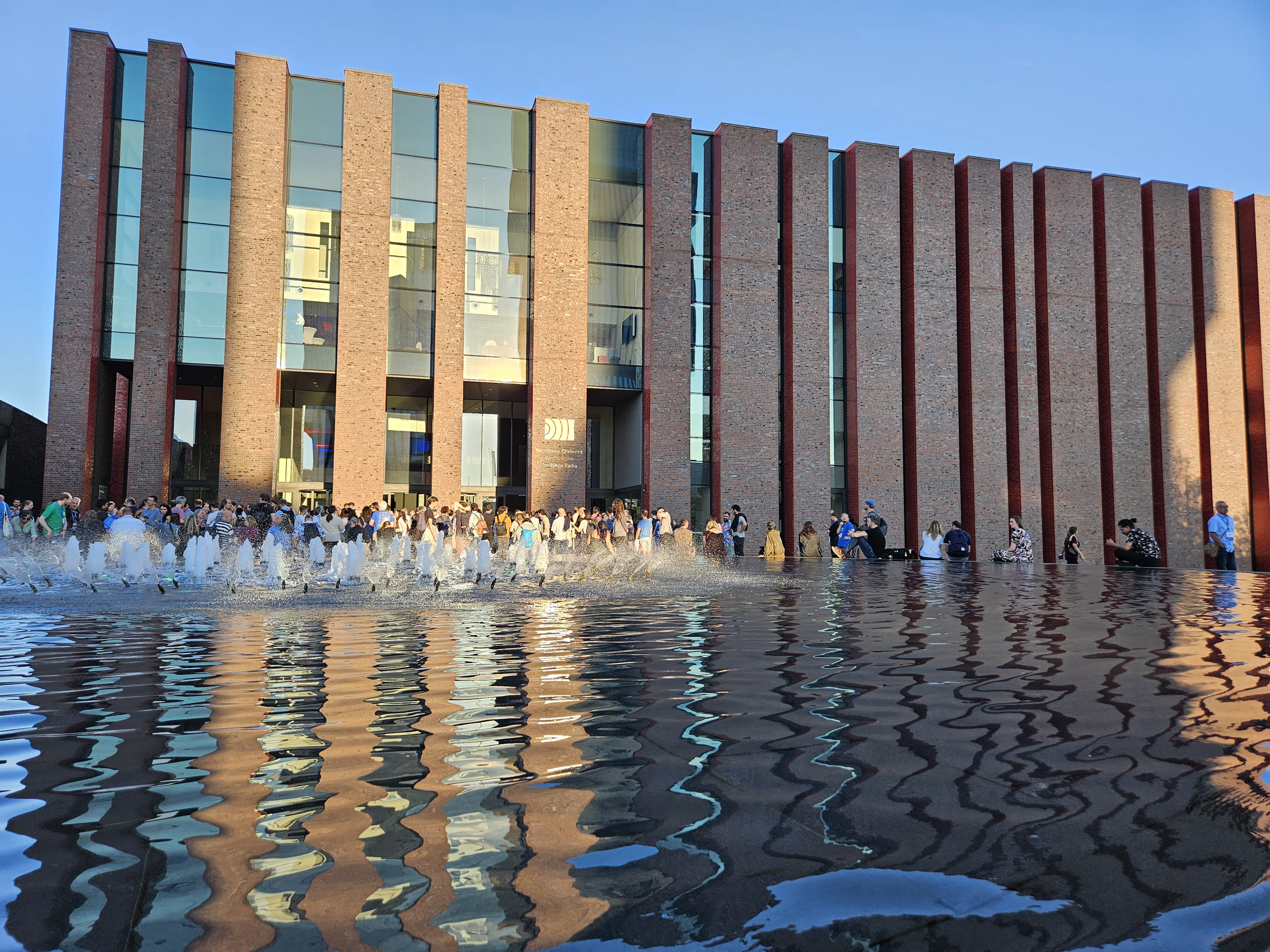
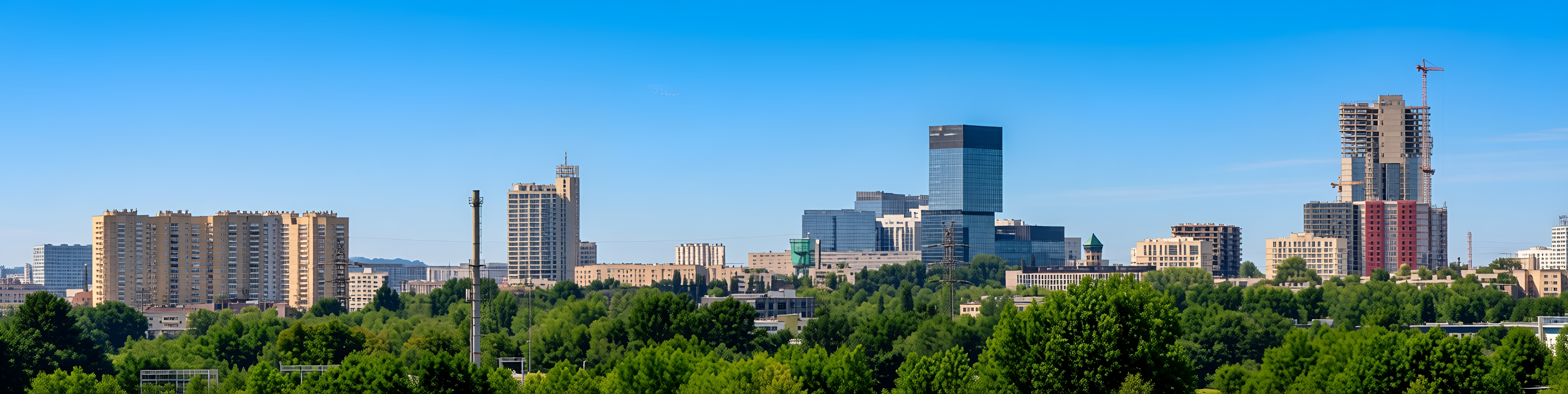
- Market Square Mariacka Street Monopol Hotel S. Parliament PKO Bank Spodek arena Radio Orchestra Panoramic view of Katowice city centre

- Flag Coat of arms Logo
- Motto: for a change
- Location within Poland
- Coordinates: 50°15′45″N 19°01′18″E
- Country: Poland
- Voivodeship: Silesian
- County: city county
- Established: 16th century – 1598 first official information
- City rights: 1865

Government
  - Body: Katowice City Council
  - City mayor: Marcin Krupa (Ind.)

Area
  - City county: 164.64 km^{2} (63.57 sq mi)
  - Urban: 2,554 km^{2} (986 sq mi)
  - Metro: 5,400 km^{2} (2,100 sq mi)
- Highest elevation: 352 m (1,155 ft)
- Lowest elevation: 266 m (873 ft)

Population (31 December 2021)
  - City county: ▼286,960 (11th)
  - Density: 1,780/km^{2} (4,600/sq mi)
  - Urban: 1,991,000
  - Metro: 2,535,354
- Demonym(s): katowiczanin (male) katowiczanka (female) (pl)

GDP
  - Urban: €44.570 billion (2021)
- Time zone: UTC+01:00 (CET)
  - Summer (DST): UTC+02:00 (CEST)
- Postal code: 40-001 to 40–999
- Area code: +48 32
- Vehicle registration: SK, IK
- Website: www.katowice.eu

Katowice (/ˌkɑtəˈvitsə/, Polish: [katɔˈvit͡sɛ]; Silesian: Katowice; German: Kattowitz) is the capital city of the Silesian Voivodeship in southern Poland and the central city of the Katowice urban area. As of 2021, Katowice has an official population of 286,960, and a resident population estimate of around 315,000. The Katowice metropolitan area has a population of 2.5 million, and is part of a larger Katowice–Ostrava metropolitan area that extends into the Czech Republic and has a population of around 5 million people.

Katowice was founded as a village in the 16th century, whereas several modern districts of Katowice were founded as villages in the Middle Ages. Throughout the mid-18th century, Katowice grew following the discovery of rich coal reserves in the area. In the first half of the 19th century, intensive industrialization transformed local mills and farms into industrial steelworks, mines, foundries and artisan workshops. The city has since reshaped its economy from a heavy industry-based one to professional services, education and healthcare. The entire metropolitan area is the 16th most economically powerful city by GDP in the European Union with an output amounting to $114.5 billion. Katowice Special Economic Zone is ranked fourth on the list of the TOP10 Global Free Zones.

Katowice has been classified as a Gamma – global city by the Globalization and World Cities Research Network and is a centre of commerce, business, transportation, and culture in southern Poland, with numerous public companies headquartered in the city or in its suburbs including energy group Tauron and metal industry corporation Fasing, important cultural institutions such as Polish National Radio Symphony Orchestra, award-winning music festivals such as Off Festival and Tauron New Music, and transportation infrastructure such as Katowice Korfanty Airport. It also hosts the finals of Intel Extreme Masters, an Esports video game tournament. Katowice is also home to several institutions of higher learning, notably the University of Silesia, the Silesian University of Technology and the Karol Szymanowski Academy of Music. The city is a member of the UNESCO Creative Cities Network having been recognized as a City of Music.

== History ==
=== Before the industrial revolution ===
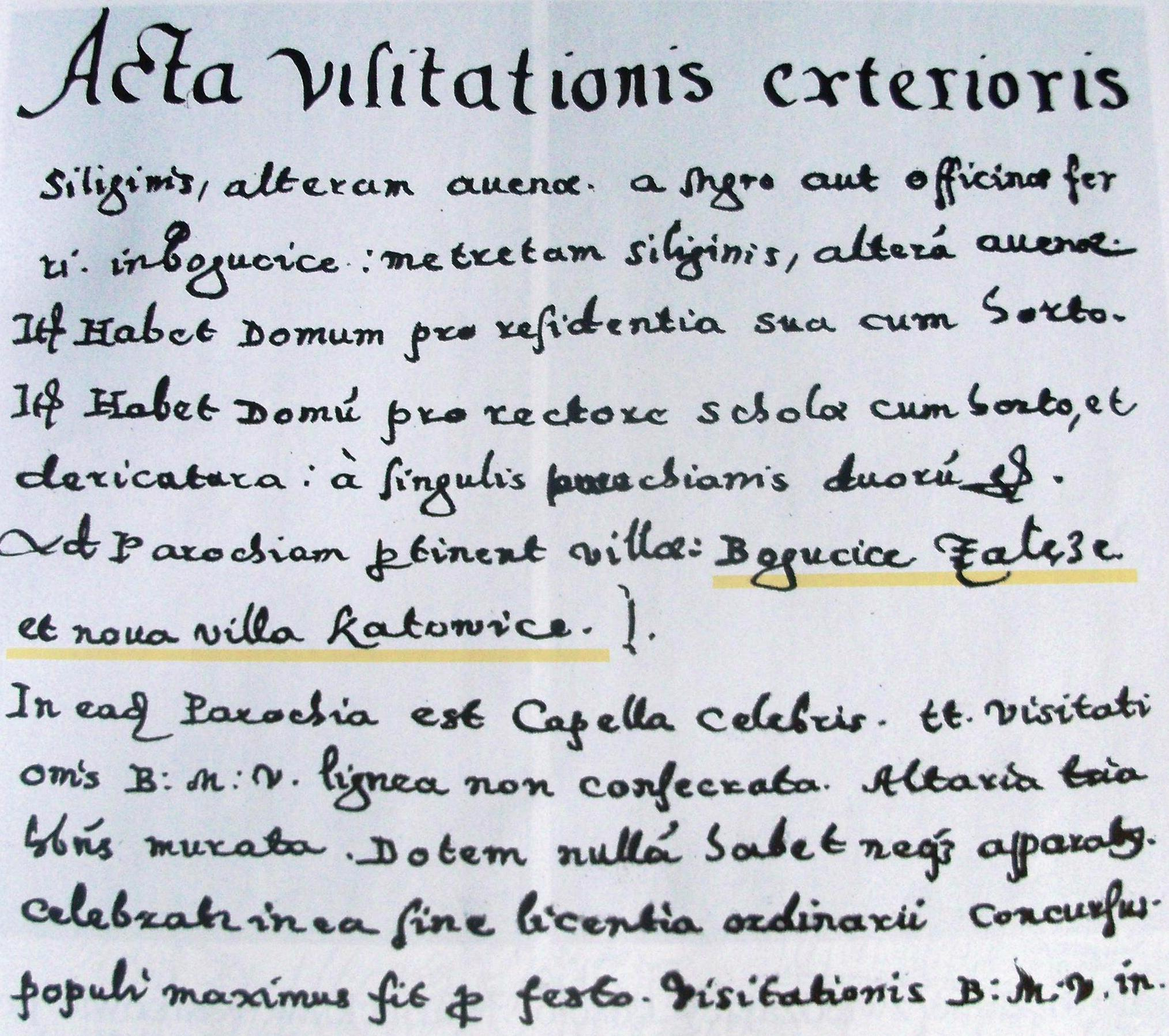
A fragment from the Bogucice Parish visitation report from 1598 that mentions the name Katowice for the first time

The area around Katowice, in Upper Silesia, has been inhabited by Lechitic Silesian tribes from its earliest documented history. While the name Katowice (Katowicze) is mentioned for the first time in 1598, other villages and settlements that would eventually become parts of modern Katowice have been established earlier, with Dąb being the oldest, mentioned in 1299 for the first time in a document issued by Duke Casimir of Bytom. Bogucice, Ligota, Szopenice and Podlesie were all established in early 14th century. Aside from farming, people living in the area would also work in hammer mills: the first one, Kuźnica Bogucka, is mentioned in 1397.

The area which would become Katowice was initially ruled by the Polish Silesian Piast dynasty until its extinction. From 1327, the region was under administration of the Kingdom of Bohemia under the Holy Roman Empire. As part of the Bohemian Crown, it was passed to the Habsburg monarchy of Austria in 1526. In 1742, along with most of Silesia, it was seized by Prussia following the First Silesian War. The two subsequent Silesian Wars left the area severely depopulated and with an economy in ruins. In 1838, Franz von Winckler bought Katowice from Karl Friedrich Lehmann and in 1841, he made it the headquarters of his estate.

=== Emergence as an industrial centre ===
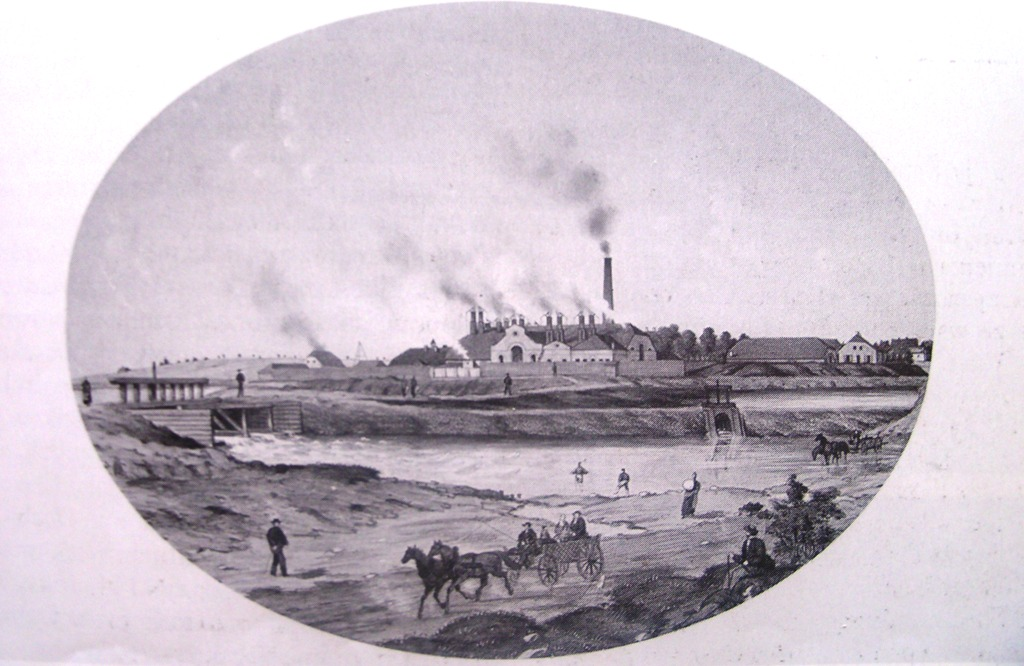
Baildon steelworks, 19th century

On 3 October 1846, the works of the final stage of the Breslau-Myslowitz (Wrocław-Mysłowice) rail line ended, built and operated by the Upper Silesian Railway. It was opened by king Frederick William IV of Prussia. A year later, on 6 August 1847, the first train arrived at the new Katowice station.

The railway connection with major European cities (Katowice gained connections to Berlin, Kraków, Vienna and Warsaw, among others, between 1847 and 1848) fostered economic and population growth. The population grew enough to erect the first Lutheran church on 29 September 1858 (Church of the Resurrection), and the first Catholic church two years later, on 11 November 1860. Katowice (then called Kattowitz) gained city status on 11 September 1865 in the Prussian Province of Silesia, by the act of the king Wilhelm I Hohenzollern.

The city flourished due to large mineral (especially coal) deposits in the area. Extensive city growth and prosperity depended on the coal mining and steel industries, which took off during the Industrial Revolution. The city was inhabited mainly by Germans, Poles incl. Silesians, and Jews. In 1884, 36 Jewish Zionist delegates met here, forming the Hovevei Zion movement. Previously part of the Beuthen district, in 1873 it became the capital of the new Kattowitz district. On 1 April 1899, the city was separated from the district, becoming an independent city.

In 1882, the Upper Silesian Coal and Steelworks Company (Oberschlesischer Berg- und Hüttenmännischer Verein) moved its headquarters to Katowice, followed by creation of the Upper Silesian Coal Convention (Oberschlesische Kohlen-Konvention) in 1898. Civic development followed industrial development: in 1851, the first post office opens in Katowice, and in 1893 the current regional post office headquarters have been opened; in 1871 the first middle school was opened (later expanded to high school); in 1889, Katowice got a district court; in 1895, the city bath opened and regional headquarters of the Prussian state railways has been established in the city; in 1907, the city theater (currently the Silesian Theatre) opened.

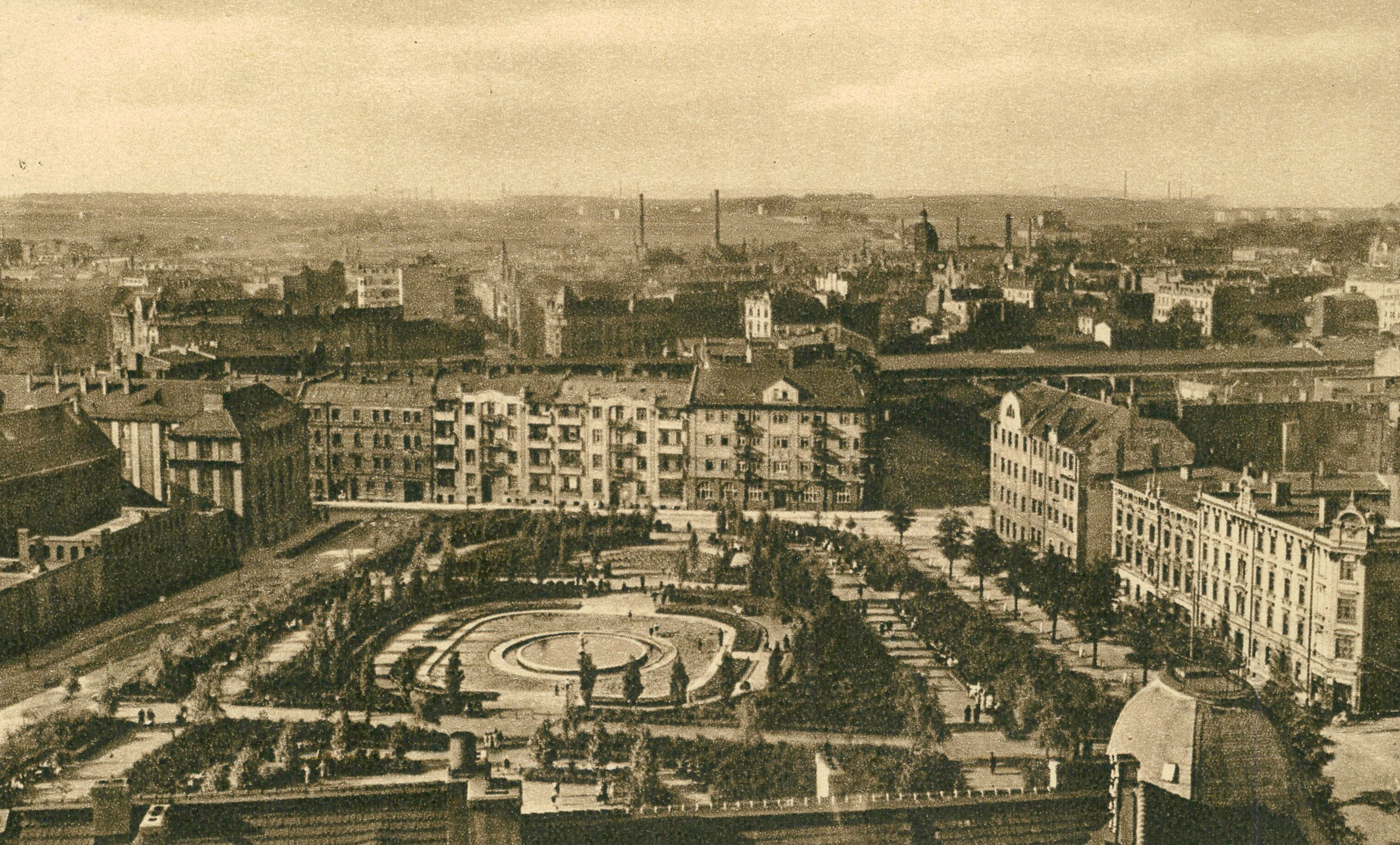
Katowice in the 1930s

Under the Treaty of Versailles after World War I, the Upper Silesia plebiscite was organised by the League of Nations. Though Kattowitz proper voted 22,774 to remain in Germany and 3,900 for Poland, it was attached to Poland as the larger district voted 66,119 for Poland and 52,992 for Germany. Following the Silesian Uprisings of 1918–21 Katowice became part of the Second Polish Republic with some autonomy for the Silesian Parliament as a constituency and the Silesian Voivodeship Council as the executive body. In 1924, the surrounding villages and towns were incorporated into Katowice, and the number of inhabitants increased to over 112,000, since then the number of Poles exceeded the number of Germans – throughout the interwar period, the number of Germans decreased (in 1925 they constituted 12% of the inhabitants of Katowice, and in 1939 only 6%, while Poles constituted 93%). At the end of the interwar period, the number of inhabitants exceeded 134,000.

From 1926 to 1933, Katowice and the Polish part of Upper Silesia were connected with Gdynia and the Polish part of Pomerania through the Polish Coal Trunk-Line (Polish: Magistrala Węglowa).

=== World War II ===
During the early stages of World War II and the Poland Campaign, Katowice was essentially abandoned by the Polish Land Forces, which had to position itself around Kraków. Nevertheless, the city was defended by local Poles, and the invading Germans immediately carried out massacres of captured Polish defenders. In the following weeks the German Einsatzkommando 1 was stationed in the city, and its units were responsible for many crimes against Poles committed in the region.

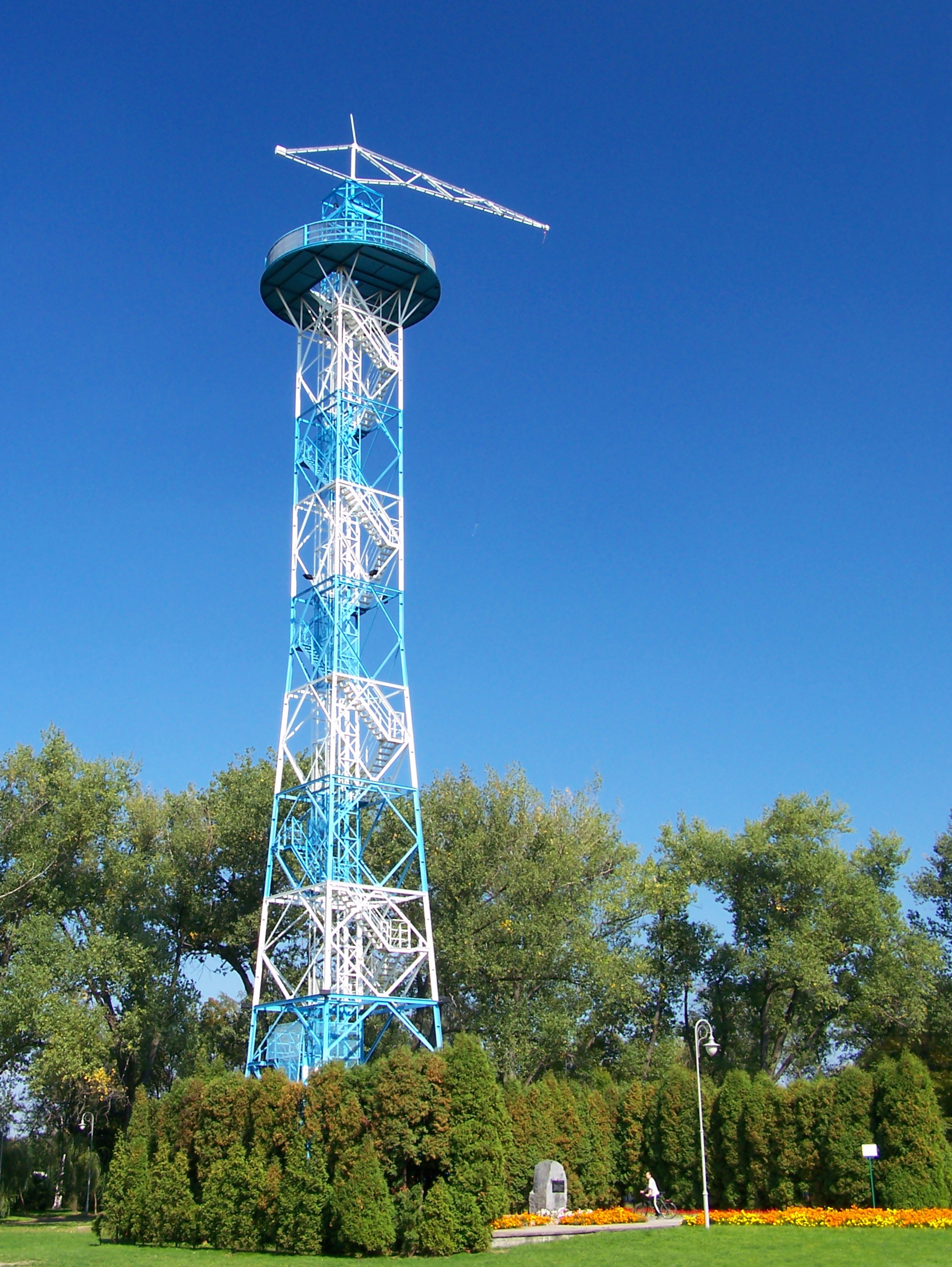
Parachute Tower, one of the symbols of the Polish Defense of Katowice

Under German occupation many of the city's historical and iconic monuments were destroyed, most notably the Great Katowice Synagogue, which was burned to the ground on 4 September 1939. This was followed by the alteration of street names and the introduction of strict rules. Additionally, the use of Polish in public conversations was banned. The German administration was also infamous for organising public executions of civilians and by the middle of 1941, most of the Polish and Jewish population was expelled. The Germans established and operated a Nazi prison in the city, and multiple forced labour camps within present-day city limits, including two camps solely for Poles (Polenlager), four camps solely for Jews, two subcamps (E734, E750) of the Stalag VIII-B/344 prisoner-of-war camp, and a subcamp of the Auschwitz concentration camp. Eventually, Katowice was captured by the Red Army in January 1945. Significant parts of the downtown and inner suburbs were demolished during the occupation. As a result, the authorities were able to preserve the central district in its prewar character.

=== Postwar period ===
The postwar period of Katowice was characterised by the time of heavy industry development in the Upper Silesian region, which helped the city in regaining its status as the most industrialised Polish city and a major administrative centre. As the city developed so briskly, the 1950s marked a significant increase in its population and an influx of migrants from the Eastern Borderlands, the so-called Kresy. The city area began to quickly expand by incorporating the neighbouring communes and counties. However, the thriving industrial city also had a dark period in its short but meaningful history. Most notably, between 7 March 1953 and 10 December 1956, Katowice was called Stalinogród in honour of Joseph Stalin, leader of the Soviet Union. The change was brought upon by an issued decree of the State Council. The date of the alteration of the city name was neither a coincidence or accidental as it happened on the day of Stalin's death. In this way, the Polish United Workers' Party and the socialist authority wanted to pay tribute to him. The new name never got accepted by the citizens and in 1956 the former Polish name was restored.

The following decades were more memorable in the history of Katowice. Regardless of its industrial significance, it started to become an important cultural and educational centre in Central and Eastern Europe. In 1968, the University of Silesia in Katowice, the largest and most valued college in the area, was founded. Simultaneously the construction of large housing estates began to evolve. Furthermore, many representative structures were erected at that time, including the Silesian Insurgents' Monument (1967) and Spodek (1971), which have become familiar landmarks and tourist sights. The 1960s and 1970s saw the evolution of modernist architecture and functionalism. Katowice eventually developed into one of the most modernist post-war cities of Poland.

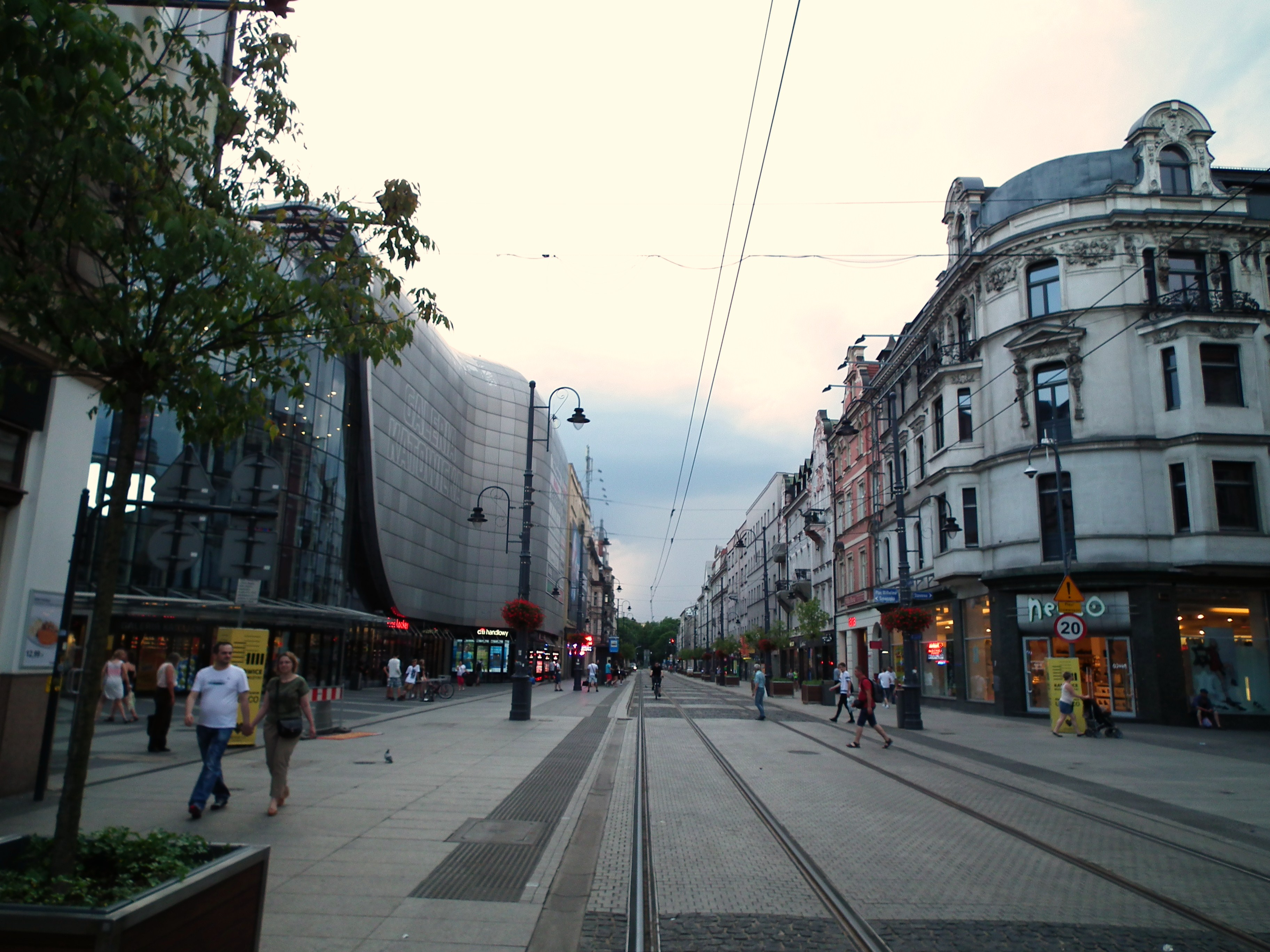
3 Maja Street is one of the main promenades in the city

One of the most dramatic events in the history of the city occurred on 16 December 1981. It was then that 9 protesters died (7 were shot dead; 2 died from injury complications) and another 21 were wounded in the pacification of Wujek Coal Mine. The Special Platoon of the Motorized Reserves of the Citizens' Militia (ZOMO) was responsible for the brutal handling of strikers protesting against Wojciech Jaruzelski's declaration of martial law and the arrest of Solidarity trade union officials. On the 10th anniversary of the event, a memorial was unveiled by the President of Poland Lech Wałęsa.

In 1990, the first democratic local elections that took place marked a new period in the city's history. The economy of Katowice has been transforming from the heavy industry of steel and coal mines into "one of the most attractive investment areas for modern economy branches in Central Europe".

=== 21st century ===
In 2008, Katowice was awarded the Europe Prize by the Parliamentary Assembly of the Council of Europe for having made exceptional efforts to spread the ideal of European unity.

The city's efficient infrastructure, rapid progress in the overall development and an increase in office space has made Katowice a popular venue for conducting business. The Katowice Expo Centre (Katowickie Centrum Wystawiennicze) organises trade fairs or exhibitions and attracts investors from all over the world. In 2018, the city was the host of the 24th Session of the Conference of the Parties to the United Nations Framework Convention on Climate Change (UNFCCC COP24). In 2022, the city hosted the 11th edition of the World Urban Forum, the world's most important conference on sustainable urbanization and development of cities.

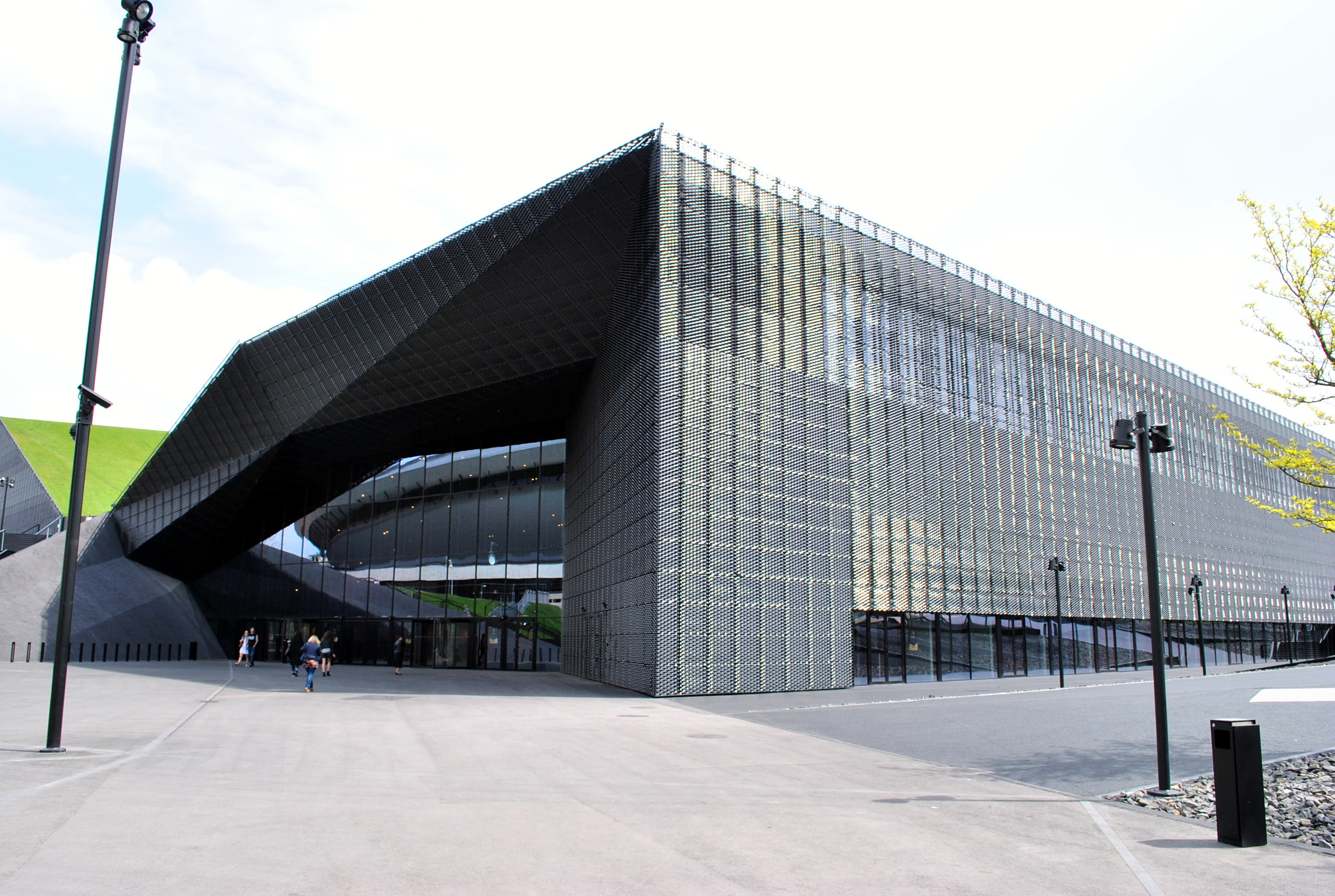
Katowice International Conference Centre, built in 2015

== Geography ==
Katowice encompasses an area of 164.67 square kilometres (63.58 sq mi). The city is situated in the Silesian Highlands, about 50 km (31 mi) north of the Silesian Beskids (part of the Carpathian Mountains). Kłodnica and Rawa (tributaries of the Oder and the Vistula respectively) are the largest rivers in Katowice, and the border between catchment areas of Oder and Vistula goes through the city. With a minimal elevation of 245 metres (804 ft) and median elevation of 266 metres (873 ft) above sea level, Katowice has the highest elevation among large cities in Poland.

=== Climate ===
Katowice has a temperate, ocean-moderated humid continental climate (Köppen climate classification: Dfb/Cfb). The average temperature is 8.2 °Celsius (−2.0 °C or 28.4 °F in January and up to 17.9 °C or 64.2 °F in July). Yearly rainfall averages at 652.8 millimetres or 25.70 inches. Characteristic weak winds blow at about 2 metres per second (4.5 mph; 7.2 km/h; 3.9 kn) from the southwest, through the Moravian Gate.

Climate data for Katowice (1991–2020 normals, extremes 1951–present)
Month	Jan	Feb	Mar	Apr	May	Jun	Jul	Aug	Sep	Oct	Nov	Dec	Year
Record high °C (°F)	16.0 (60.8)	18.8 (65.8)	22.8 (73.0)	29.5 (85.1)	32.2 (90.0)	34.6 (94.3)	35.7 (96.3)	37.2 (99.0)	34.4 (93.9)	26.6 (79.9)	20.9 (69.6)	18.2 (64.8)	37.2 (99.0)
Mean daily maximum °C (°F)	1.8 (35.2)	3.7 (38.7)	8.2 (46.8)	14.9 (58.8)	19.6 (67.3)	22.9 (73.2)	24.9 (76.8)	24.6 (76.3)	19.2 (66.6)	13.7 (56.7)	7.8 (46.0)	2.7 (36.9)	13.7 (56.7)
Daily mean °C (°F)	−1.6 (29.1)	0.1 (32.2)	3.6 (38.5)	9.3 (48.7)	13.8 (56.8)	17.3 (63.1)	19.1 (66.4)	18.6 (65.5)	13.7 (56.7)	8.9 (48.0)	4.2 (39.6)	0.0 (32.0)	9.0 (48.2)
Mean daily minimum °C (°F)	−4.3 (24.3)	−3.4 (25.9)	−0.7 (30.7)	3.5 (38.3)	8.0 (46.4)	11.7 (53.1)	13.4 (56.1)	12.9 (55.2)	8.9 (48.0)	4.6 (40.3)	0.9 (33.6)	−2.9 (26.8)	4.4 (39.9)
Record low °C (°F)	−27.4 (−17.3)	−30 (−22)	−20.8 (−5.4)	−8.2 (17.2)	−3.4 (25.9)	−0.3 (31.5)	4.8 (40.6)	3.1 (37.6)	−3.4 (25.9)	−8 (18)	−16.3 (2.7)	−24.4 (−11.9)	−30 (−22)
Average precipitation mm (inches)	43.8 (1.72)	39.4 (1.55)	47.7 (1.88)	44.9 (1.77)	75.7 (2.98)	78.7 (3.10)	103.8 (4.09)	73.1 (2.88)	69.9 (2.75)	53.4 (2.10)	49.0 (1.93)	43.8 (1.72)	723.2 (28.47)
Average extreme snow depth cm (inches)	9.1 (3.6)	8.2 (3.2)	5.0 (2.0)	2.3 (0.9)	0.0 (0.0)	0.0 (0.0)	0.0 (0.0)	0.0 (0.0)	0.0 (0.0)	0.3 (0.1)	3.0 (1.2)	4.9 (1.9)	9.1 (3.6)
Average precipitation days (≥ 0.1 mm)	17.50	15.97	14.77	12.00	14.73	14.30	14.83	12.23	12.37	14.07	14.23	16.43	173.44
Average snowy days (≥ 0 cm)	17.7	15.2	6.1	1.4	0.0	0.0	0.0	0.0	0.0	0.2	4.4	13.1	58.1
Average relative humidity (%)	84.6	80.5	74.1	66.5	69.8	70.8	71.8	73.4	79.6	83.0	85.9	86.3	77.2
Mean monthly sunshine hours	50.7	70.6	122.6	182.7	223.7	230.6	246.8	241.3	162.6	114.5	61.3	43.0	1,750.3
Source 1: Institute of Meteorology and Water Management
Source 2: Meteomodel.pl (records, relative humidity 1991–2020)

=== Neighborhoods ===
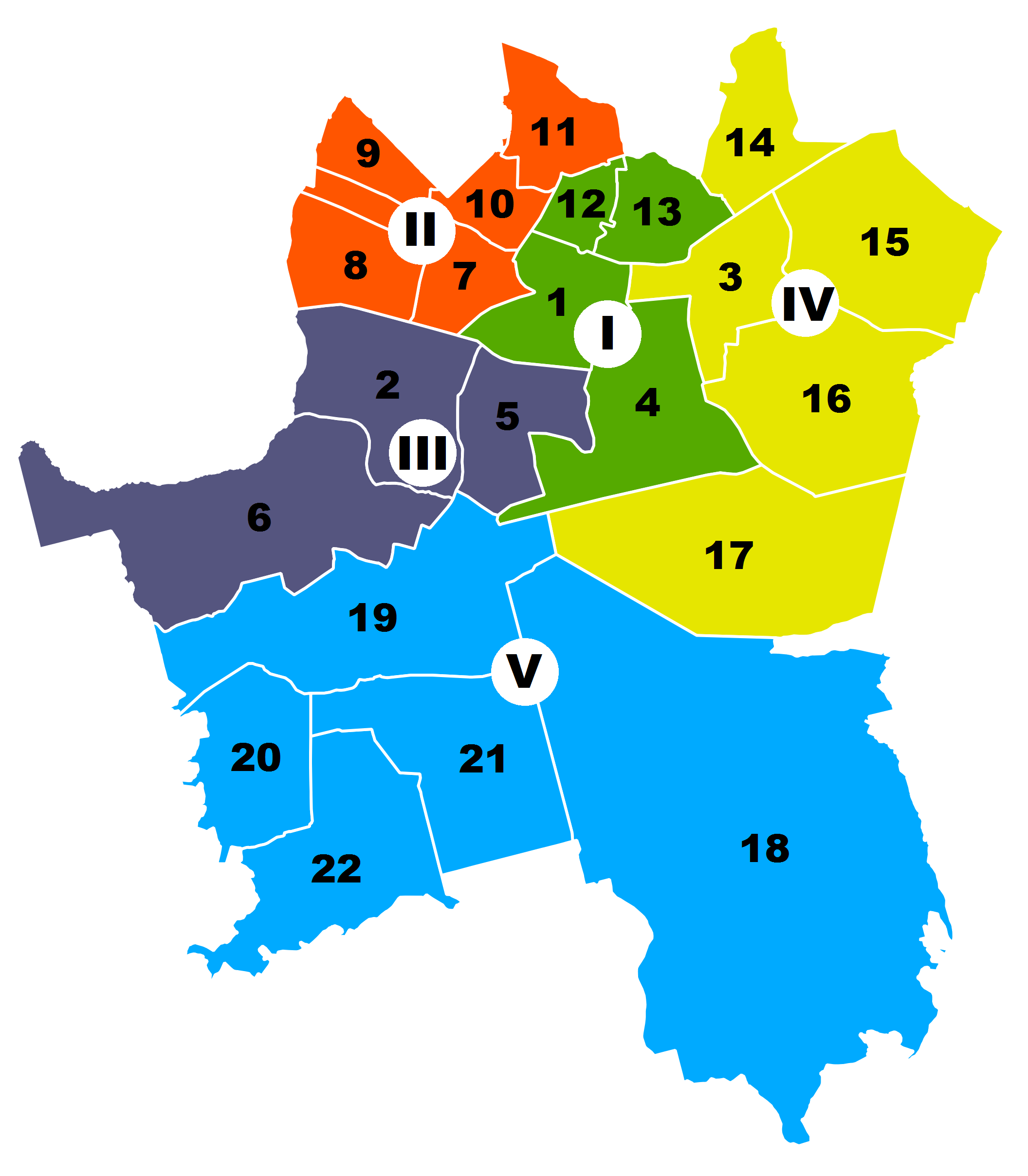
Map of Katowice, showing its 5 districts and 22 neighbourhoods.

Katowice has 22 officially recognized neighborhoods. Śródmieście, Osiedle Paderewskiego-Muchowiec, Zawodzie and Koszutka form the dense central urban core where most cultural and educational institutions, businesses and administrative buildings are located.

Most Northern and Eastern neighborhoods around the downtown core are more working-class and developed from worker's estates build around large industry such as coal mines, manufactures and steelworks. Each of these neighborhoods has its own dense commercial strip surrounded by mid-rise apartment buildings and some single-family homes. Szopienice, located between downtown Katowice and Mysłowice, used to be a separate town until mid-1960s. Nikiszowiec, a former mine's town, has undergone strong gentrification in recent years, and emerged as a major tourist attraction in the region thanks to its unique architecture and art galleries.

Western and Southern neighborhoods (with the exception of Brynów-Załęska Hałda, which is a working-class neighborhood built around a coal mine) are more suburban in nature, concentrating the city's middle and upper middle classes.

I. Central District

- 1. Śródmieście
- 4. Osiedle Paderewskiego-Muchowiec
- 12. Koszutka
- 13. Bogucice

II. Northern District

- 7. Załęże
- 8. Osiedle Witosa
- 9. Osiedle Tysiąclecia
- 10. Dąb
- 11. Wełnowiec-Józefowiec

III. Western District

- 2. Brynów-Załęska Hałda
- 5. Brynów-Osiedle Zgrzebnioka
- 6. Ligota-Panewniki

IV. Eastern District

- 3. Zawodzie
- 14. Dąbrówka Mała
- 15. Szopienice-Burowiec
- 16. Janów-Nikiszowiec
- 17. Giszowiec

V. Southern District

- 18. Murcki
- 19. Piotrowice-Ochojec
- 20. Zarzecze
- 21. Kostuchna
- 22. Podlesie

=== Metropolitan area ===
Katowice lies in the centre of the largest conurbation in Poland, one of the largest in the European Union, numbering about 2.7 million. The Katowice metropolitan area consists of about 40 adjacent cities and towns, the whole Katowice-Ostrava metropolitan area (mostly within the Upper Silesian Coal Basin) over 50 cities or towns and a population of 5,008,000. In 2006, Katowice and 14 adjacent cities united as the Metropolitan Association of Upper Silesia (predecessor to the current Metropolis GZM). Its population was 2 million and its area was 1,104 km^{2} (426 sq mi). In 2006–2007 the union planned to unite these cities in one city under the name "Silesia", but this proved unsuccessful.

The Katowice conurbation comprises settlements which have evolved because of the mining of metal ores, coal and raw rock materials. The establishment of mining and heavy industry which have developed for the past centuries has resulted in the unique character of the cityscape; its typical aspects are the red brick housing estates constructed for the poorer working class, factory chimneys, manufacturing plants, power stations and quarries. The inhabitants of a large mining community like Katowice, and local administrations within the conurbation, which have only evolved due to mining, are a subject to overall decline after the liquidation of coal mines and factories. This is one of the reasons which led to the development of the service sector, including office spaces, shopping centres and tourism.

Map of the Metropolitan Association of Upper Silesia, with Katowice highlighted near its centre.

District	Population (30 June 2017)	Area (km^{2})	Density (km^{2})
Katowice	297,197	164.67	1,896
Sosnowiec	204,958	91.06	2,444
Gliwice	181,715	133.88	1,474
Zabrze	175,016	80.40	2,352
Bytom	168,968	69.44	2,661
Ruda Śląska	138,754	77.73	1,860
Tychy	128,191	81.64	1,590
Dąbrowa Górnicza	121,387	188.73	682
Chorzów	109,151	33.24	3,420
Jaworzno	92,215	152.67	626
Mysłowice	74,600	65.75	1,139
Siemianowice Śląskie	67,710	25.5	2,809
Piekary Śląskie	55,820	39.98	1,477
Świętochłowice	50,529	13.31	4,097

== Demographics ==
Historical population
Year	Pop.	±%
1825	675	—
1845	1,326	+96.4%
1861	3,780	+185.1%
1875	11,000	+191.0%
1890	16,513	+50.1%
1910	43,173	+161.4%
1923	56,739	+31.4%
1931	127,044	+123.9%
1938	132,894	+4.6%
1945	107,735	−18.9%
1950	175,496	+62.9%
1960	269,926	+53.8%
1970	305,000	+13.0%
1978	348,538	+14.3%
1988	367,014	+5.3%
2002	327,222	−10.8%
2011	310,764	−5.0%
2021	285,711	−8.1%

The Polish Statistical Office estimates Katowice's population to be 292,774 as of 31 December 2020, with a population density of 1,778 inhabitants per square kilometre (4,600/sq mi). There were 139,274 males and 153,500 females. Age breakdown of people in Katowice is: 12.9% 0–14 years old, 13.7% 15–29 years old, 23.8% 30–44 years old, 19.5% 45–59 years old, 20.1% 60–74 years old, and 9.9% 75 years and older.

Katowice is a centre of the Katowice-Ostrava metropolitan area, with a population of approx. 5.3 million. This metropolitan area extends into the neighboring Czechia, where the other centre is the city of Ostrava. 41 municipalities that constitute the core of the metropolitan area created the Metropolis GZM association, which has 2.3 million people as of 2019.

=== Historical population ===
Katowice's population grew very fast between 1845 and 1960, fueled by the expansion of heavy industry and administrative functions. In the 60s, 70s and 80s, the city grew by another 100,000 people, reaching a height of 368,621 in 1988. Since then, the decline of heavy industry, emigration, and suburbanization reversed the population development; Katowice lost approx. 75,000 people (20%) since the fall of communism in Poland.

Before World War II, Katowice was mainly inhabited by Poles and Germans. The 1905 Silesian demographic census has shown that Germans made up nearly 70–75% of the total population (including German Jews) and Poles constituted 25–30% of inhabitants of Katowice. After the plebiscite in Upper Silesia, Silesian uprisings and the incorporation of Katowice into Poland in 1922, and then the incorporation of several nearby villages and towns into the city, the number of inhabitants of Katowice increased significantly, but the number of Germans in Katowice fell to 12% in 1925 and to 6% in 1939 (most Germans left Poland, many ethnic Silesians who used to identify as Germans switched their identification to Poles, and areas with a Polish majority were incorporated). Thus, in 1939 the ethnic breakdown of the city was: 93% Poles, 6% Germans, and 1% Jews.

After the German aggression against Poland in 1939, some Poles were displaced from Katowice and Germans were settled in their place. During the war, the Nazi occupiers committed severe crimes against the local Roma and Jewish communities, either killing them on the spot or transporting them to concentration camps such as Auschwitz for complete extermination. This led to a wartime population drop. In 1945, practically the entire German minority has either left fleeing the Red Army or was forced to leave after Poland regained control of the city, and Poles from Kresy (Eastern Borderlands of interwar Poland that were annexed by USSR after the war) and other parts of the country started to come to settle in the city. Katowice enjoyed a population boom after World War II, driven primarily by internal economic migration from less developed parts of the country.

Since the late 1960s, Katowice and the surrounding area experiences low birth rates, which, paired with the decline of heavy industry and reduced job opportunities, caused the population of Katowice to start decreasing in the late 1980s. As of recent years, increased economic activity in the area has stopped outward migration but the negative natural change (more deaths than births) continues to fuel population decline.

=== Ethnic diversity ===
Katowice is one of the more diverse cities in Poland. In the 2021 census, 93.87% of inhabitants declared a Polish nationality while 19.38% declared a nationality other than Polish (in the Polish census, respondents are allowed to declare up to two nationalities or ethnicities). Indigenous Silesians were the largest minority, at 17.8%, followed by Germans (0.43%), Ukrainians (0.18%), the English (0.12%), Jews (0.07%) and Italians (0.07%).

In addition, Katowice is home to a large immigrant population that is largely unaccounted for in the official population data in Poland. According to the Polish Ministry of Development, Labor and Technology, there have been 20,527 foreigners (7% of official population figure) on a special worker permit for citizens of Belarus, Georgia, Moldova, Russia, Serbia and Ukraine in Katowice in 2020, 19,003 of them from Ukraine. By the end of 2021, this number has increased to 26,990, with 23,207 of them from Ukraine. Additionally, as of June 2022, 11,568 refugees settled in Katowice since the start of the Russian invasion on Ukraine. By the December 2024, the number has increased to 11,894.

=== Socioeconomics ===
According to the 2021 census, 32.3% of the population aged 13 and older had a college degree, 34.3% had a high school diploma or some college, 17.9% completed a vocational secondary school, 2.4% only completed a gimnazjum, 8.4% only completed a primary school while 2.1% did not complete primary school. In 2011, in the 25–34 age group, college graduates share is 44.9%, and an additional 31.8% has a high school degree. According to Eurostat data, Katowice and its surrounding Silesian region had one of the highest share of people who have attained at least an upper secondary level of education (more than 90%), and one of the lowest share of school dropouts in Europe (less than 5%).

There were 120,869 households in Katowice as of the 2021 census, a drop from 134,199 in the 2011 census. Average household size was 2.33, virtually unchanged from the 2.3 reported in the previous census. 32.4% households were single-person households, 31.2% had two people, 18.5% had three people, 11.5% had four people and 6.4% had five people or more. Compared to the 2011 census, the largest difference was an increase in households with 5 and more people (from 4.9%).

As of 2022, Katowice placed third in the country among cities with the highest average salaries, at PLN 8,017.49, behind Warsaw and Kraków. Poverty rate places Katowice on average with other big cities in Poland, at 4.09% of inhabitants eligible for welfare benefits as of 2019.

=== Religion ===
Roman Catholicism is the main religion in Katowice; as of the 2021 Polish census, 60.52% (172,915 people) of Katowice residents declared to be Roman Catholic, representing a significant drop from the 2011 census when Roman Catholics were 82.43% of the population.

No other denomination had at least 1,000 followers as of the 2021 census. In the 2011 census, denominations with at least 1,000 worshippers included the Lutheran Church in Poland – 0.43% (1,336 people) and Jehovah's Witnesses – 0.42% (1,311 people). Other religions with presence and places of worship in the city include Judaism, Islam, and Buddhism, as well as other Protestant denominations.

==== Christianity ====
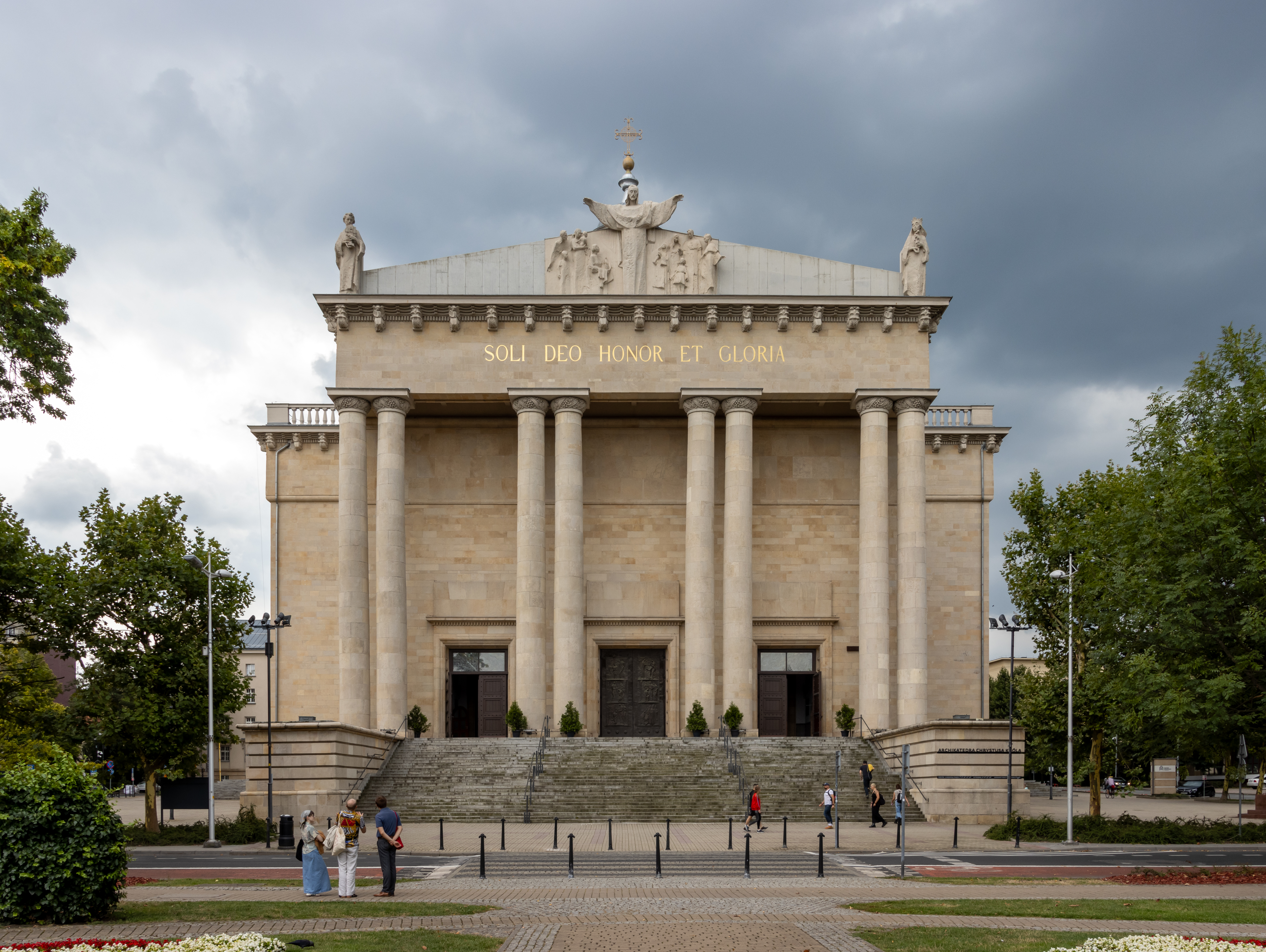
Cathedral of Christ the King, seat of the Roman Catholic Archdiocese of Katowice

Katowice is the seat of the Roman Catholic Archdiocese, with the suffragan bishoprics of Gliwice and Opole, and around 1,477,900 Catholics. The Cathedral of Christ the King, constructed between 1927 and 1955 in a classicist style, is the largest cathedral in Poland. There are 36 Catholic churches in Katowice (including two basilicas), as well as 18 monasteries. Katowice is also a seat of a diocesan Catholic seminary, as well as one of the Order of Friars Minor. Katowice Archdiocese owns several media companies headquartered in Katowice: Księgarnia św. Jacka, a Catholic publishing company, and Instytut Gość Media, a multi-channeled media company that owns Radio eM, a regional Catholic radio, and a few magazines. Gość Niedzielny, owned by Instytut Gość Media and published in Katowice, is currently the most-popular Catholic magazine in the country with approx. 120,000 copies sold weekly.

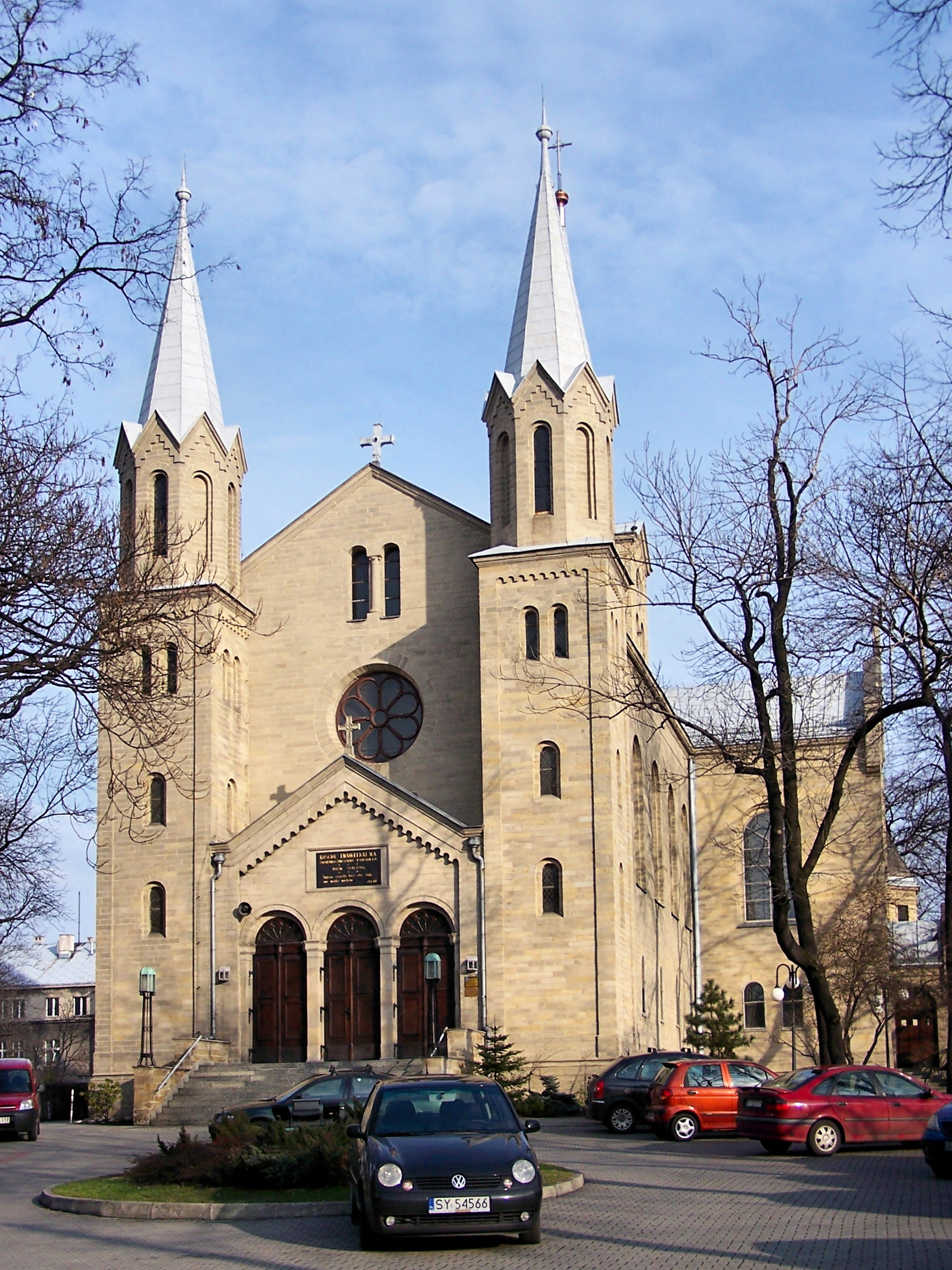
Lutheran Cathedral of the Resurrection

Katowice is also the seat of a Lutheran Diocese which covers Upper Silesia, Lesser Poland and Subcarpathian region and has 12,934 adherents as of 2019. Lutherans have two churches in Katowice, including a cathedral, which is the oldest church built originally in Katowice, completed on 29 September 1858. Historically, Lutheran population in Katowice was mostly German, and with the expulsion of Germans from Poland after the Second World War, number of Lutherans dropped in Katowice.

Other denominations with churches or praying houses in Katowice include Seventh Day Adventists, Baptists, Christ Church in Poland, Pentecostals and other evangelical and Protestant groups.

==== Judaism ====
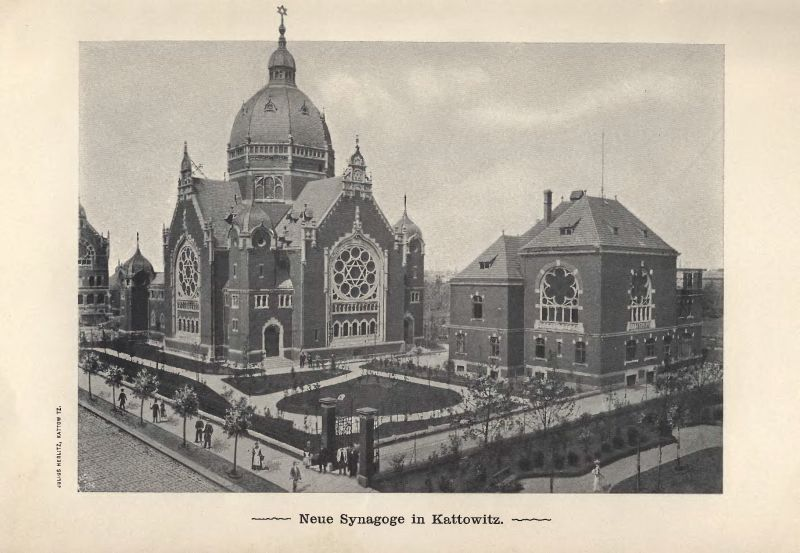
The Great Synagogue was destroyed by the German Nazis during the invasion of Poland on 4 September 1939

Judaism has historically been present in Katowice since at least 1702. The first synagogue, designed by a local architect Ignatz Grünfeld, was consecrated on 4 September 1862, while the Jewish cemetery was established in 1868. Dr. Jacob Cohn was the first rabbi of Katowice, appointed to this function on 6 January 1872 and holding it until 1920s. Zionism was strong in Katowice, and in 1884 the city was the place of the Katowice Conference, the first public Zionist meeting in history. On 12 September 1900, the Great Synagogue was opened.

Following World War I and subsequent creation of the Polish state, most Katowice Jews, who identified with Germany, left the city and settled primarily in Bytom, a nearby city that was still part of Germany. They were partially replaced by Jews moving from the East, particularly the neighboring Dąbrowa Basin region that had a large Jewish population. In 1931, 60% of 5,716 Jews in Katowice were recent immigrants from other parts of Poland. On 1 September 1939, Poland was attacked by Nazi Germany, and Katowice, a border city, surrendered on 3 September. The Great Synagogue was burned by the German army the same day, and in the following months, Katowice Jews were deported to ghettos in Dąbrowa Basin (primarily Sosnowiec and Będzin) or directly to various concentration and death camps where most of them were murdered in the Holocaust. After the war, around 1,500 Jews were living in Katowice, but most of them left Poland and emigrated to the United States and other Western countries.

Currently, Katowice has one Qahal with approximately 200 members. It owns houses of prayer in Katowice (along with a kosher cafeteria) and nearby Gliwice, and the current rabbi is Yehoshua Ellis.

==== Other religions ====
There are two buddhist groups in Katowice: Kwan Um School of Zen, first registered in 1982, and the Diamond Road of Karma Kagyu line association. Jehovah's Witnesses maintain 13 houses of prayer and one Kingdom Hall in Katowice. Aside from Polish-language congregations, there is one for English speakers and one for Ukrainian speakers.

== Architecture and urban design ==
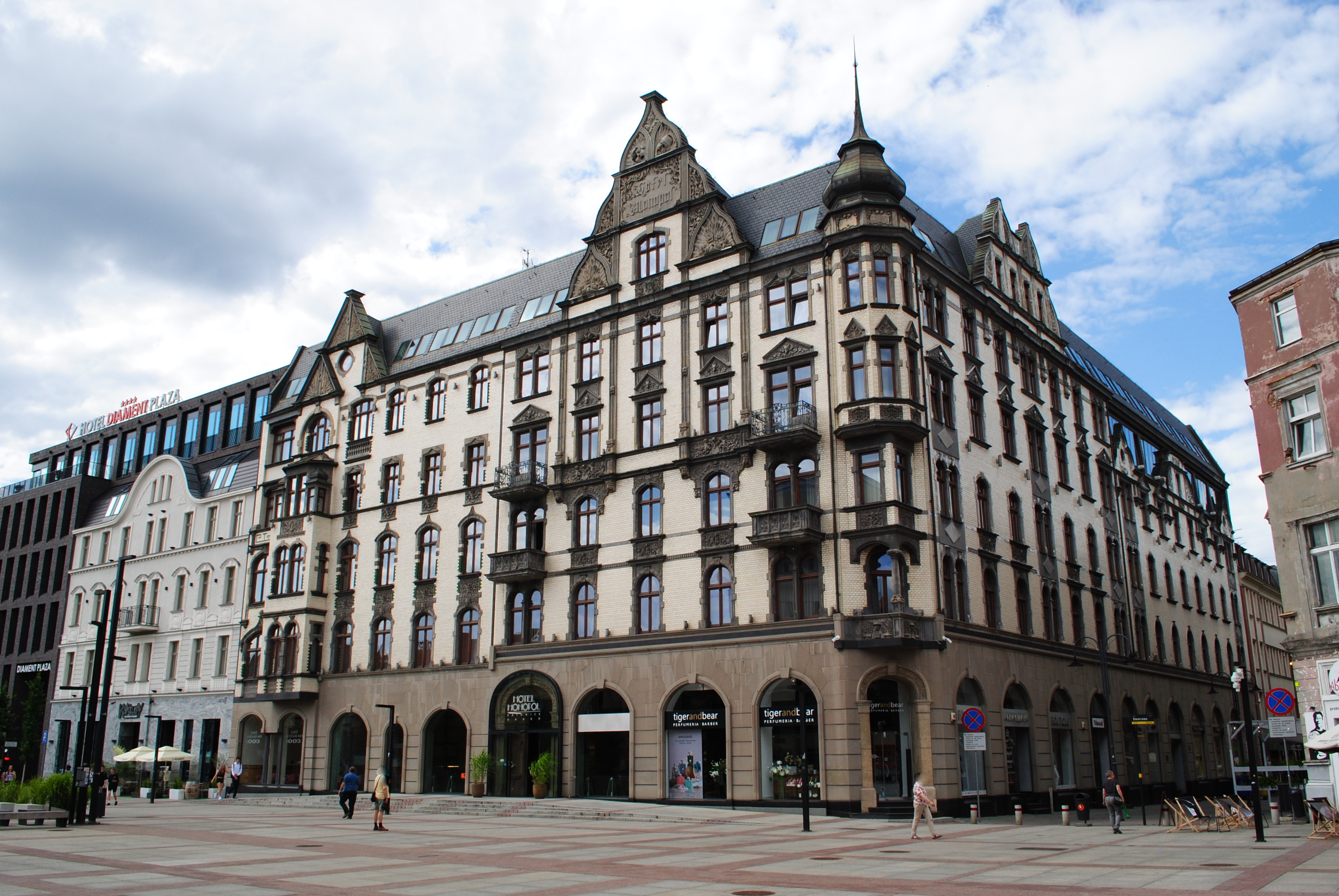
Neo-Renaissance Monopol Hotel opened in 1902

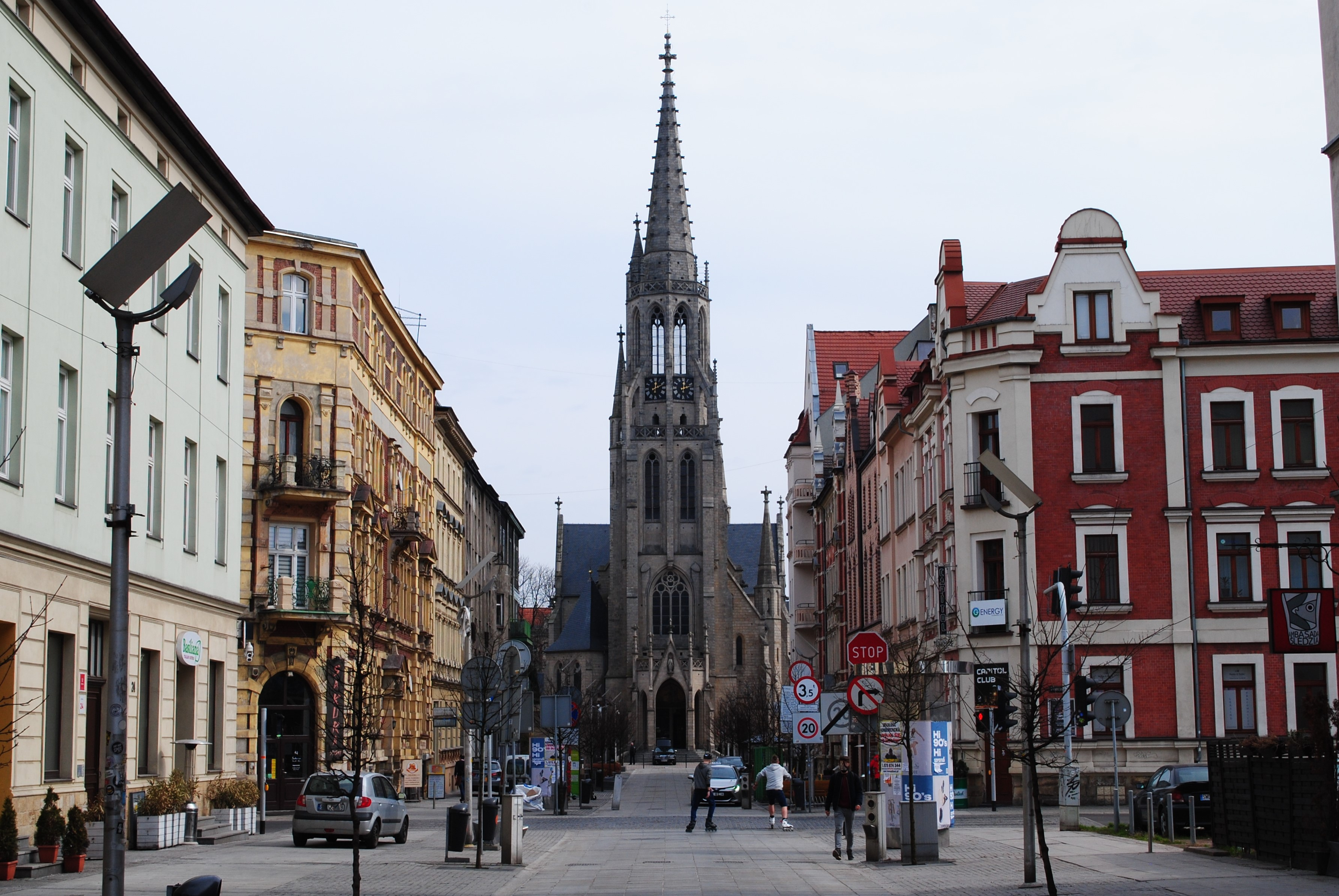
Neo-Gothic St. Mary's Church from the 19th century

=== Late 19th/early 20th century ===
Unlike most other large Polish cities, Katowice did not originate as a medieval town, therefore it does not have an old town with a street layout and architectural styles characteristic to cities founded on Magdeburg rights. Katowice's urban layout is a result of expansion and annexation of various towns, industrial worker estates, and villages.

Katowice city centre has an axis design, along the main railway line, developed by an industrialist Friedrich Grundman in mid-19th century. Most of the city centre in Katowice developed in late 19th and early 20th century, when it was part of the Kingdom of Prussia and had a German-speaking majority. As a result, architectural styles of that era are similar to those in other Prussian cities such as Berlin or Wrocław (then Breslau); primarily renaissance revival and baroque revival, with some buildings in gothic revival, romanesque revival, and art nouveau styles.

=== Interwar architecture ===
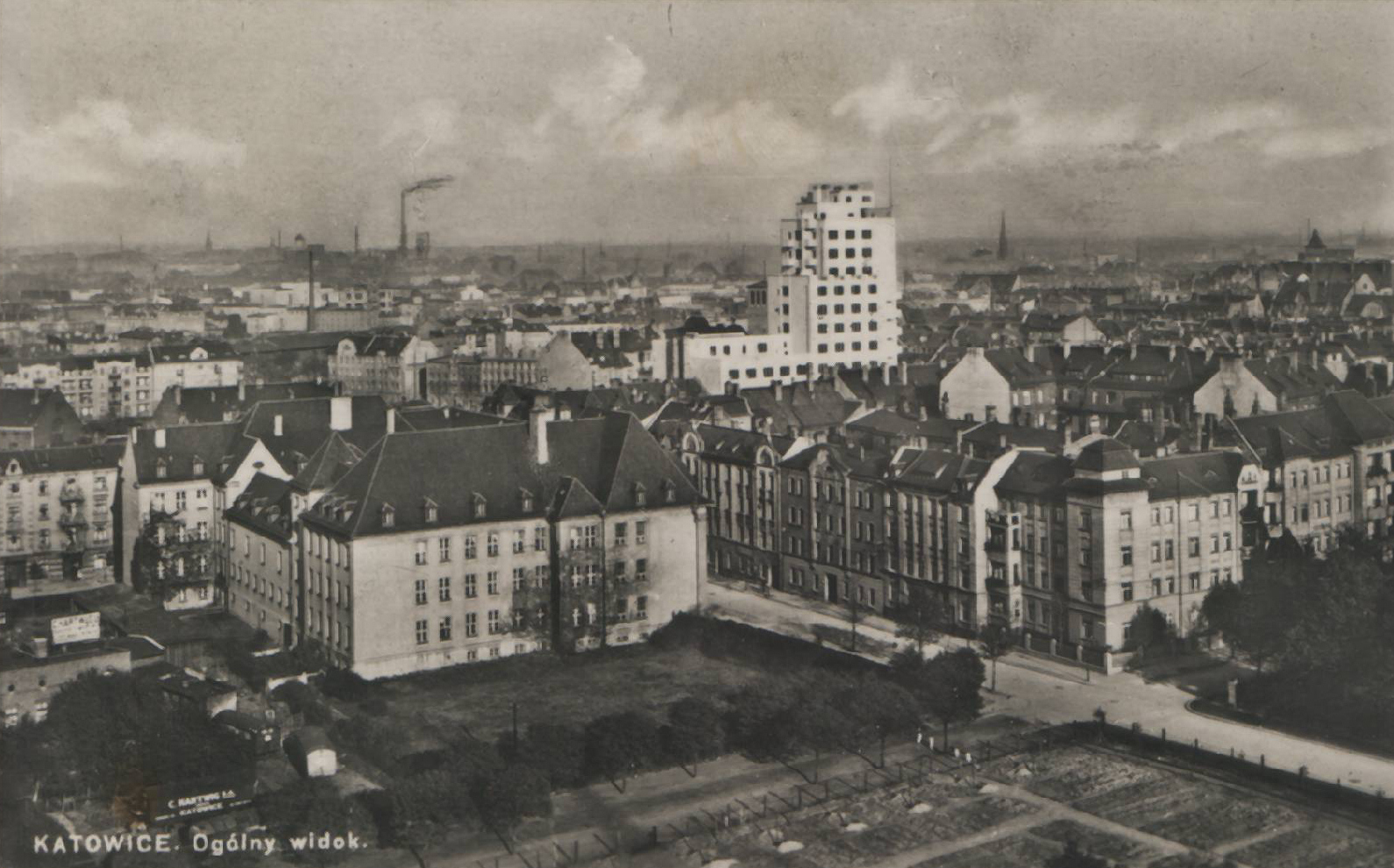
Interwar panorama of Katowice with Drapacz Chmur visible in centre

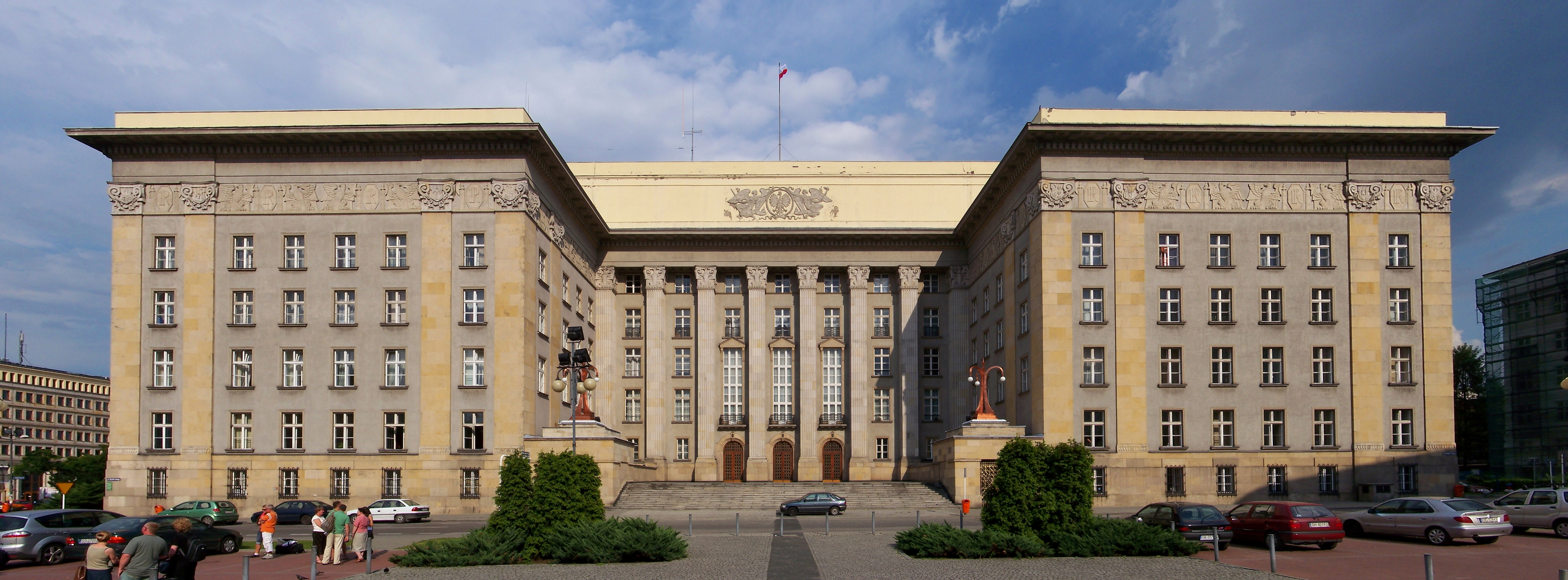
Silesian Parliament

In 1922, Katowice and the eastern portion of Upper Silesia were reintegrated with reborn Poland, and an autonomous Silesian Voivodeship was established, with Katowice as its capital. This event has marked the beginning of a period of unprecedented architectural development in the city. Since most traditional styles, especially gothic and gothic revival, were perceived as connected to imperial Germany by the new Polish authorities, all new development was to be built in, at first in the neoclassical, and later in functionalist/Bauhaus style. The city, which needed to build administrative buildings for the new authorities and housing for people working in regional administration, began expansion southward creating one of the largest complexes of modern architecture in Poland, comparable to Warsaw and Gdynia (newly built port on the Baltic Sea) only.

The modernist district is centered around the monumental Silesian Parliament building (1923–1929), which architecture is mostly neoclassical, albeit with early modernist influences. During World War II, the building became headquarters of the Reichsgau Oberschlesien and part of the interior was redesigned by Albert Speer, Hitler's favorite architect, to resemble the interior of the Reich Chancellery. The nearby Cathedral of Christ the King (1927–1955, with dome lowered by 34 meters compared to original design) is also neoclassical but with an ascetic, modernist-inspired interior (including a tabernacle and a golden mosaic funded by future pope, Joseph Ratzinger). Other buildings, designed in mid-to-late 1920s and 1930s, are mostly modernist or functionalist. A symbol of the city in the interwar period, Drapacz Chmur (literally: The Skyscraper), was the first skyscraper built in Poland after World War I, and the first building in the country to be based on a steel frame.

=== Post-war architecture ===
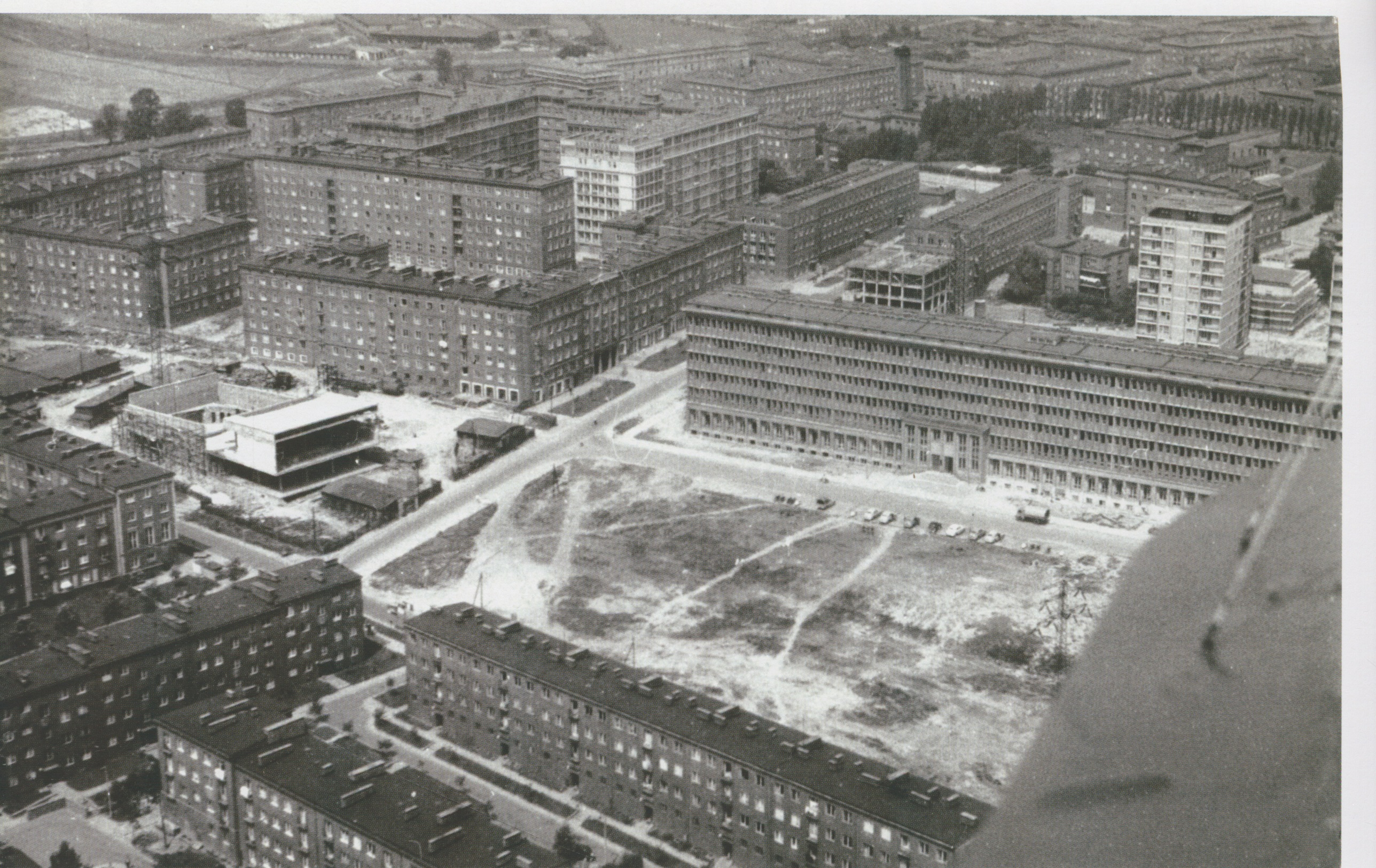
Plac Grunwaldzki in Koszutka under construction, 1950s

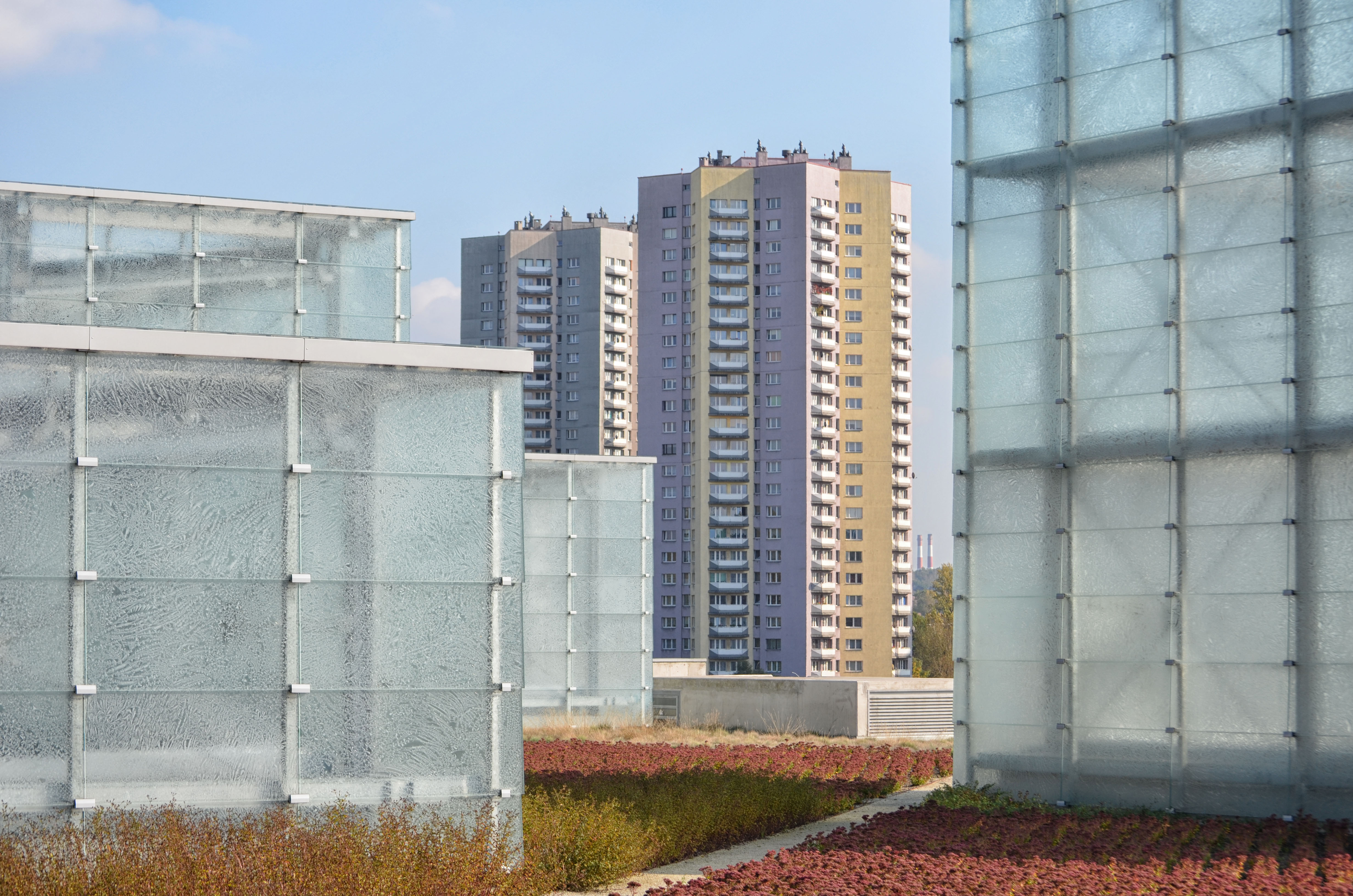
Modernist Osiedle Gwiazdy built in late 1970s and the light cubes of the New Silesian Museum

After World War II, Katowice again expected a period of rapid growth, particularly under the regional leadership of Marshall Jerzy Ziętek. Pałac Młodzieży (Youth Palace) became the first major new building completed in Katowice after the war, erected in the socrealist style with elements of late modernism in 1949–1951. The largest development of the 1950s in Katowice was the expansion of the Koszutka neighborhood, also in the socialist realist style, in early 1950s.

Following the death of Stalin in 1956, and the end of socrealism, Jerzy Ziętek and city authorities commissioned a group of young architects and urbanists to create a project of the new urban design of Katowice. The collective, named Miastoprojekt Katowice, came up with a design heavily influenced by Le Corbusier's ideas. The project was centered around a grand avenue (current Aleja Korfantego) surrounded by simple, modern blocks and monuments, scattered in distance to each other according to modernist ideals of preserving space and light for the masses. The most important buildings from that time include:

- Spodek Arena (1964–1971), widely considered the symbol of Katowice and ranked among the finest achievements of modern architecture in Poland; one of the first buildings in the world with a tensegrity rooftop. Arena's unique design, resembling a typical depiction of a UFO at the time, gave it its Polish name (literally meaning "a saucer", a shorthand for UFO in Polish).
- Katowice Railway Station (1959–1972), considered to be the most outstanding example of brutalism in Poland, controversially demolished in 2010 and partially rebuilt as an addition to the Galeria Katowicka shopping centre.
- Superjednostka (1967–1972), a massive (187.5 meters length, 51 meters high) residential block heavily inspired by Le Corbusier's Unite d'habitation in Marseille
- Osiedle Gwiazdy (1978–1985), a housing estate of eight 27-floor residential buildings on a plan resembling a star
- Osiedle Tysiąclecia (1961–1982, later expanded), a large housing estate connecting to the Silesian Park, built with modernist principles (separation of foot and automobile traffic, vast green spaces, self-sufficiency in terms of schools, basic shops and healthcare). Later expansion of the estate includes Kukurydze high-rises, a group of 26-floor high residential towers inspired by Marina City in Chicago
- Stalexport Towers (1979–1982), twin office towers with 22 and 20 floors, a prime example of early postmodernism in Poland

=== Contemporary architecture ===
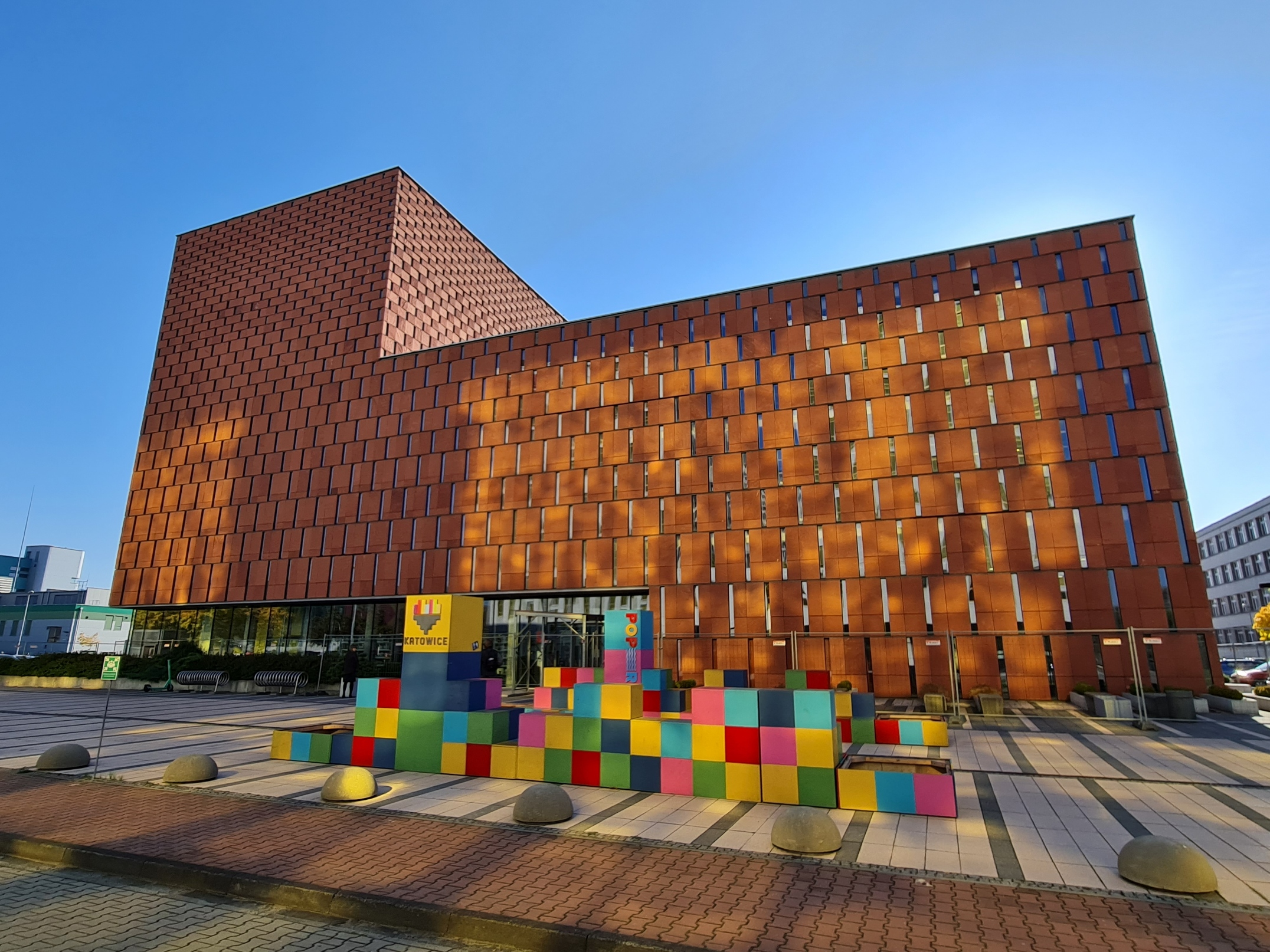
Scientific Information Centre and Academic Library

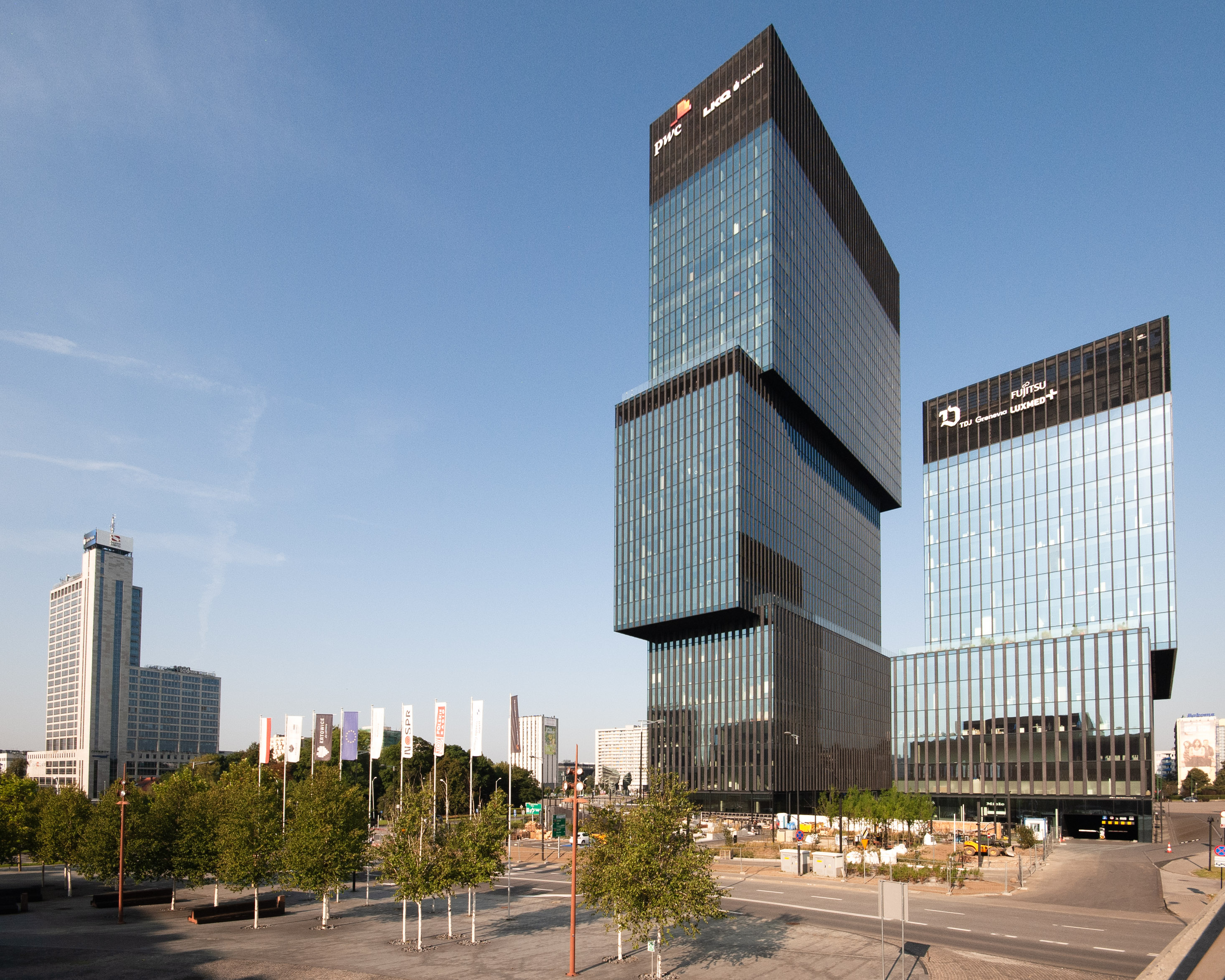
KTW towers (right) with Altus on the left

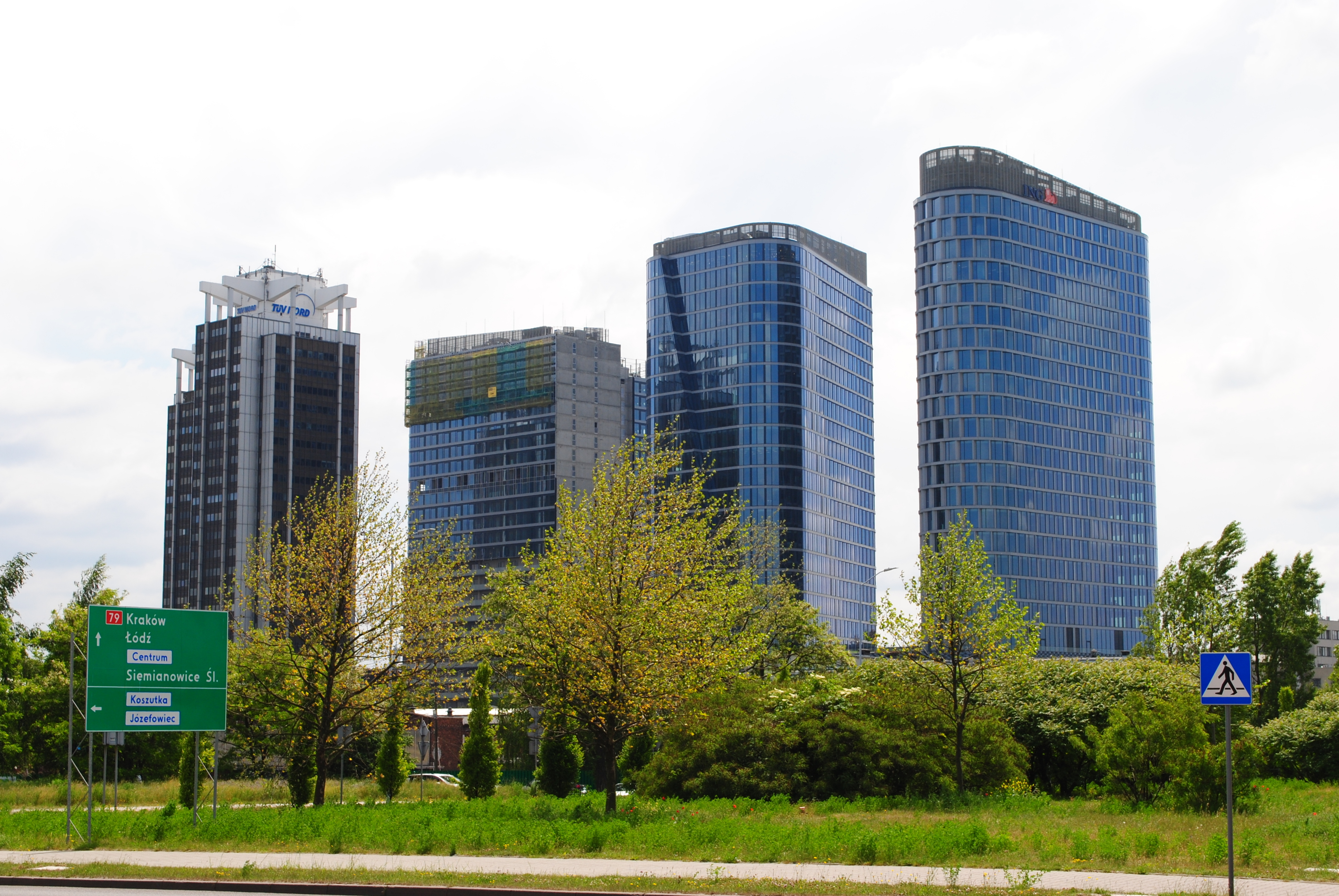
Global Office Park

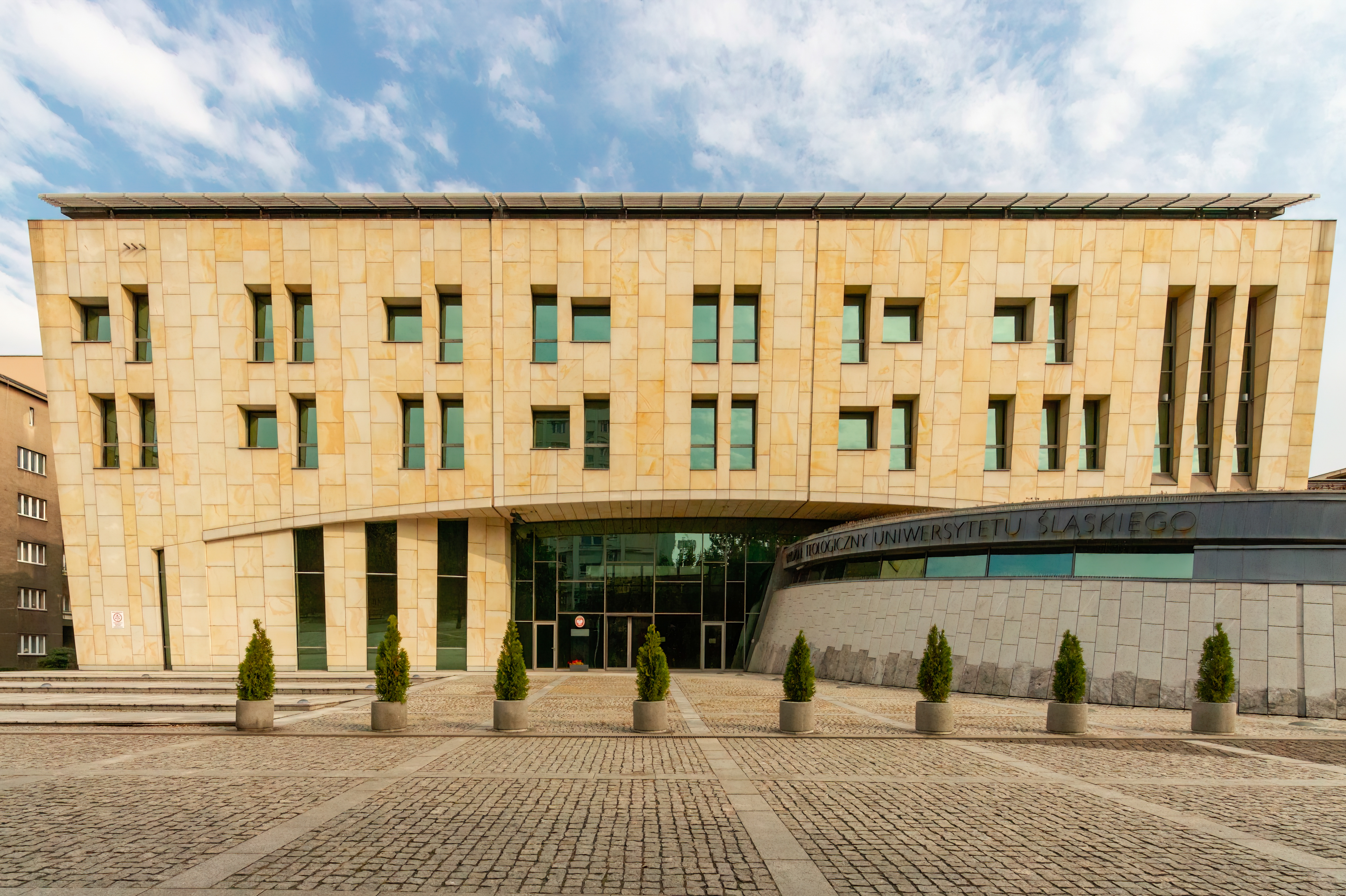
Theology Department at the University of Silesia

Following the collapse of communism in Poland and other Eastern Bloc countries, and the centrally-planned economy with it, Poland's economy suffered a downturn, and construction slowed down. One of the most significant buildings of the 1990s was the new branch of the Silesian Library, in postmodernism style.

The situation changed in the early aughts, when several new notable developments were completed:

- Chorzowska 50 (1999–2001) – first modern, A-grade office building in Katowice; currently owned and occupied by ING Bank Śląski
- Altus, previously known as Uni Centrum (2001–2003) – for many years the highest skyscraper in Poland outside of Warsaw, at 125 meters (410 ft) high.
- Silesia City Center (2003–2005), the flagship brownfield development of the era, built in place a defunct coal mine Gottwald. It remains one of the largest shopping centres in Poland, at 86,000 m^{2} (930,000 sq ft), and also includes a housing estate and a chapel.
- Dom z Ziemi Śląskiej (2001–2002), a modern suburban villa, nominated to Mies van der Rohe Award in 2002
- Department of Law at the University of Silesia (2001–2003), a postmodernist building aiming to resemble industrial installations of the region
- Department of Theology at the University of Silesia (2002–2004), built in the style resembling early Christian hermitages

Another wave of architectural revival came after Poland joined the European Union in 2004. European cohesion funds, along with private capital investment, flew into the city resulting in a number of architecturally acclaimed buildings and complexes, including:

- Strefa Kultury (Zone of Culture, a brownfield urban redevelopment in downtown Katowice):
  - National Polish Radio Symphony Orchestra (NOSPR) building (2012–2014) contains two concert halls (for an audience of 1,800 or 300). Nominated to Mies van der Rohe Award in 2014, first prize in European Commercial Property Awards.
  - Katowice International Conference Centre (2012–2015), the largest conference centre in Poland (capacity up to 12,000 people), connected to the Spodek Arena. The design of the centre, with a distinct canyon going through it in order to remove any obstruction from view of Spodek, has been hailed and the building was nominated to Mies van der Rohe award in 2017
  - New Silesian Museum (2011–2013) located in place of a former coal mine, most of the museum is located underground, with only glass cubes that provide daylight, visible above ground. Shortlisted for Mies van der Rohe award in 2015.
- CINiBA (2009–2011) – academic library of the University of Silesia and Katowice University of Economics, shortlisted to Mies van der Rohe award in 2013.
- Krzysztof Kieślowski Film School at the University of Silesia (2014–2017) – awarded with Wienerberger Brick Award in 2020, shortlisted to Mies van der Rohe award in 2019. Located in a decayed neighborhood, the building aims at kick-starting an urban renewal process there.
- KTW (2018–2022) – the taller tower, KTW II, is the tallest building in Katowice and one of the tallest in Poland at 135 metres (443 ft).
- Global Office Park (2022–2023) – mixed-use complex featuring four buildings, with two office towers reaching 104 metres (341 ft).

=== Tourist attractions ===
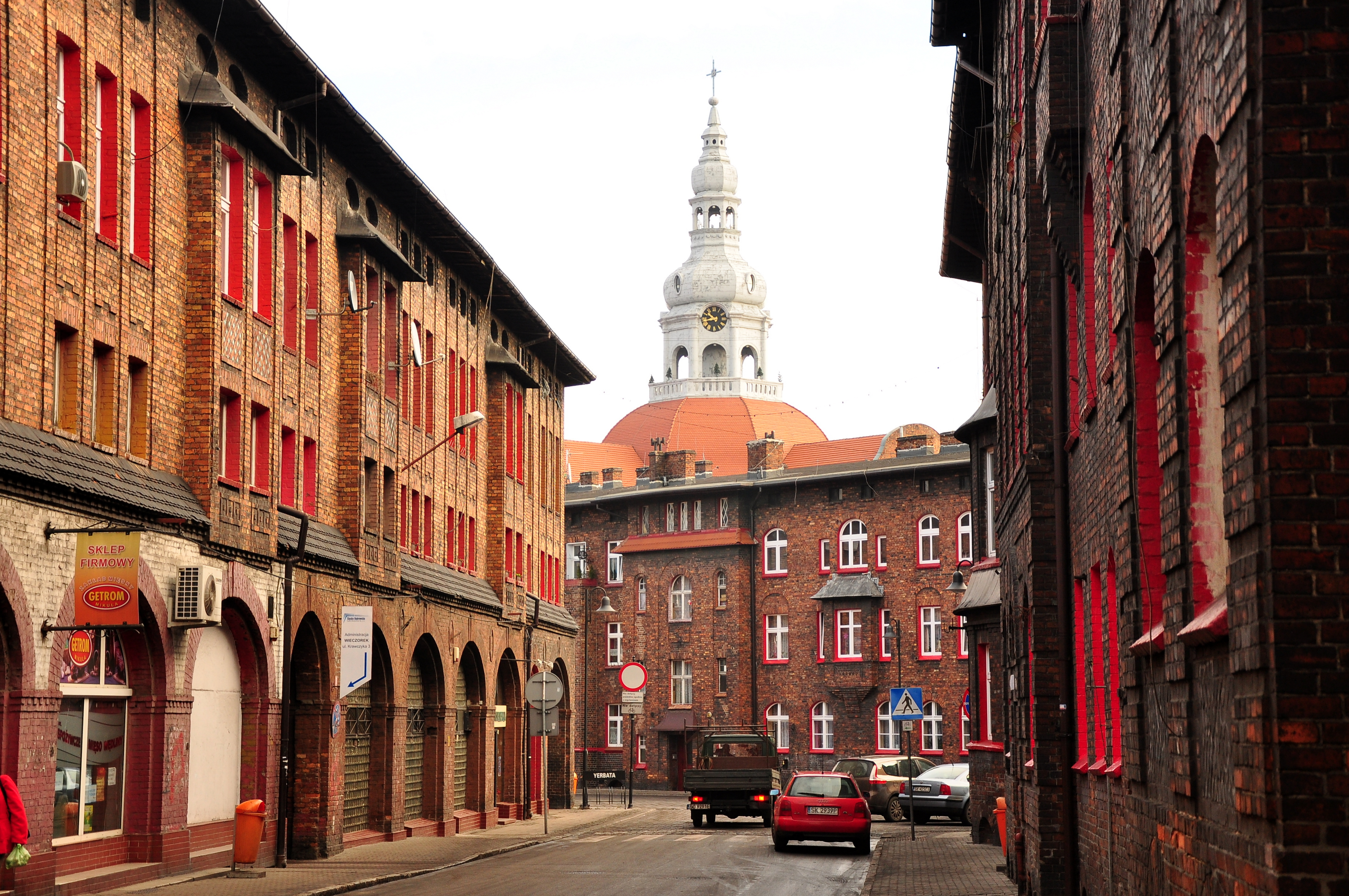
Nikiszowiec, a historic workers' housing estate

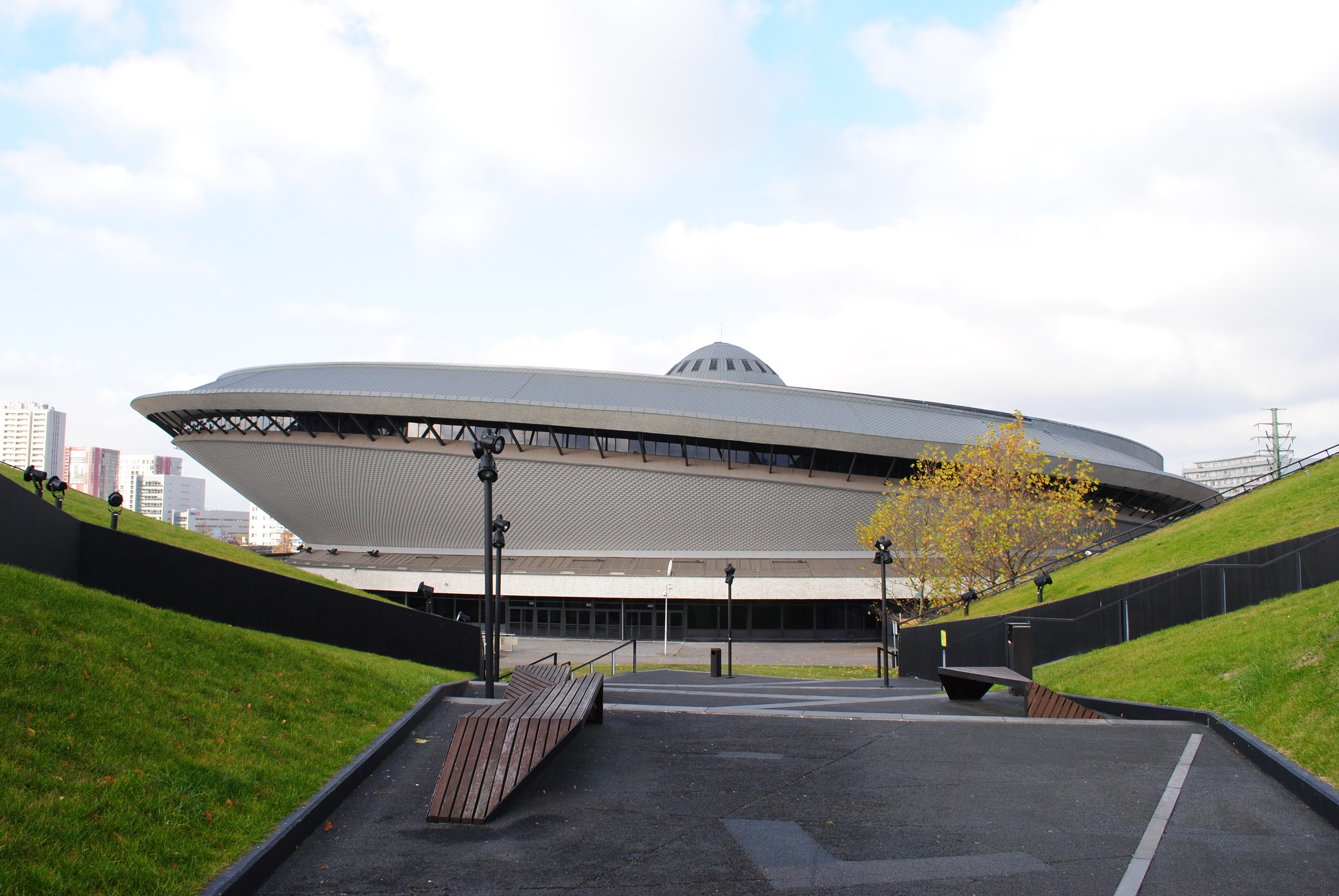
Spodek, a multipurpose arena from 1971

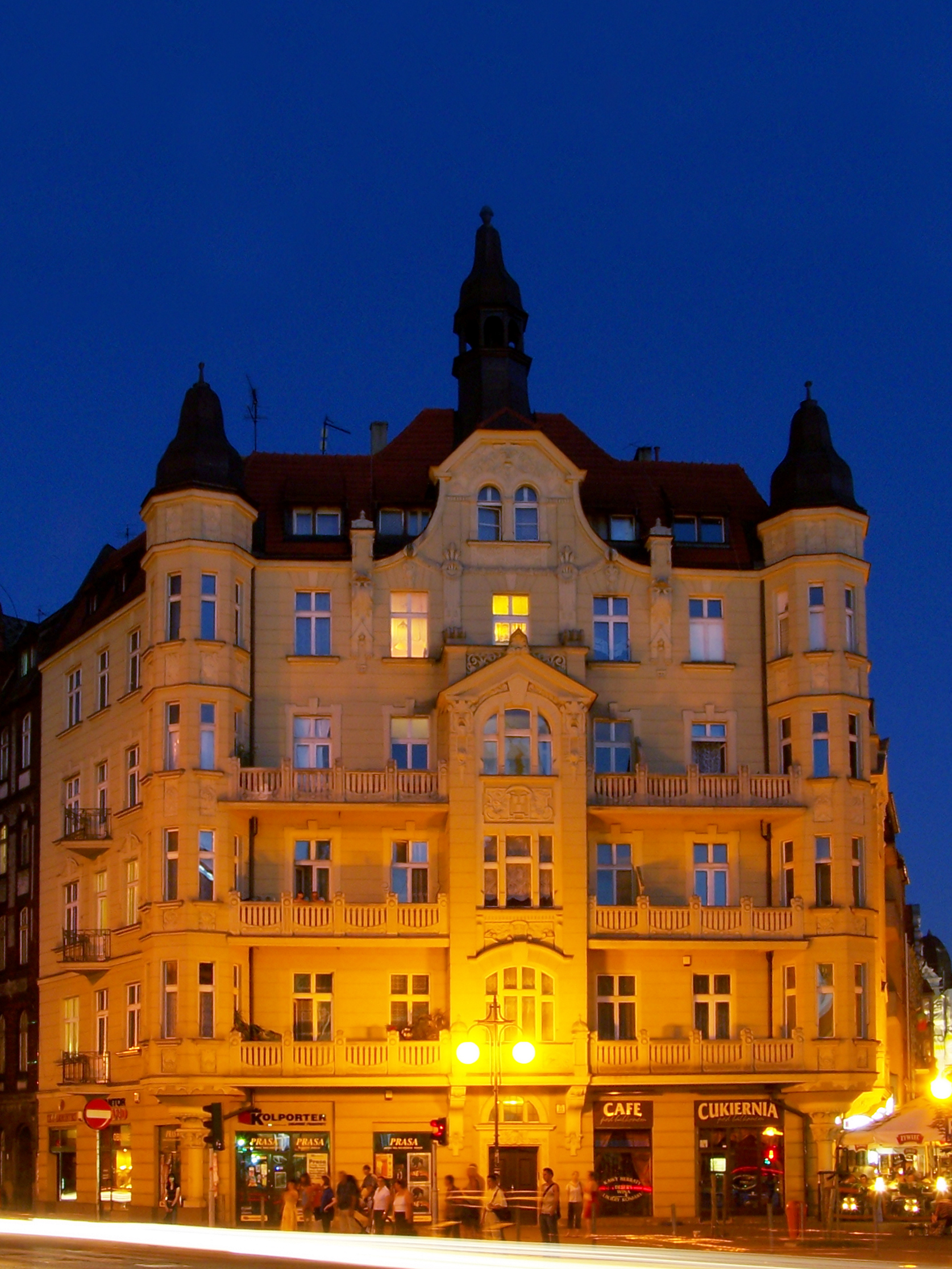
A historic tenement house in the city centre

- Market square and adjacent streets: Warszawska, Teatralna, Dyrekcyjna, Staromiejska, Dworcowa, św. Jana, Pocztowa, Wawelska, 3 Maja, Stawowa, Mielęckiego, Starowiejska and Mickiewicza, the so-called "Great Market Square of Katowice" or "Old town of Katowice"—many historic (monument) buildings. This is a group of functional-architectural. On the market square and most of the above-mentioned streets are prohibitions or restrictions on cars. Streets: Staromiejska, Dyrekcyjna, Wawelska, Stawowa and Warszawska is lined decorative cobblestone creating a pedestrian zone. The authority plans to Katowice—Quarter streets: św. Jana, Dworcowa, Mariacka, Mielęckiego, Stanisława and Starowiejska is to become so "small market square".
- Nikiszowiec – historical settlement of Katowice, candidate to UNESCO
- Cathedral of Christ the King
- St Mary's Church
- Church of the Resurrection, Evangelical-Augsburg, built in 1856–1858
- Church of St Michael Archangel, the oldest church in the city, built in 1510
- Drapacz Chmur, one of the first skyscrapers in Europe
- Silesian Parliament, built in 1925–1929. For a very long time, it was the biggest structure in Poland
- Modernist old town
- Spodek (a large sports centre/concert hall, whose name translates as the 'saucer', from its distinctive shape resembling a UFO flying saucer)
- Silesian Insurgents Monument (Polish: Pomnik Powstańców Śląskich), the largest and heaviest monument in Poland. It is a harmonious combination of architecture and sculpture with appropriate symbolism: the wings symbolize the three Silesian Uprisings (1920–1921) while the names of places that were battlefields are etched on the vertical slopes. The monument, which was funded by the people of Warsaw for Upper Silesia, is considered Katowice's landmark.
- Silesian Theater, built in 1907
- Rialto Cinetheater, built in 1912
- Silesian Museum, built in 1899
- Old train station in Katowice, built in 1906
- The Goldstein Palace
- The Załęże Palace
- Parachute Tower, a 50 m (160 ft) tall lattice tower was built in 1937 for training parachutists. It was used in the first days of World War II and is the only parachute tower in Poland.

Other:

- Franciscan Monastery in Panewniki
- Church of St Joseph (Załęże)
- St Stephen's Church
- Church of Christ Resurrection
- The Monument to Marshal Piłsudski by Croatian sculptor Antun Augustinčić, 1937–39. It was commissioned in 1936 but brought to Poland in 1991
- Monopol Hotel
- Katowice Rondo, the large square/roundabout, reconstructed recently, with the semi-circular Galeria Rondo Sztuki in the centre.

== Economy ==
Katowice has been classified as a Gamma – global city by the Globalization and World Cities Research Network and is considered as an emerging metropolis. Katowice's metropolitan area is the 16th most economically powerful urban area in the European Union by GDP, with an output amounting to $114.5 billion. The city is one of the major industrial, commerce and financial hubs of Poland and has successfully transformed its economy from heavy industry-based to knowledge-based one.

=== Employment and incomes ===
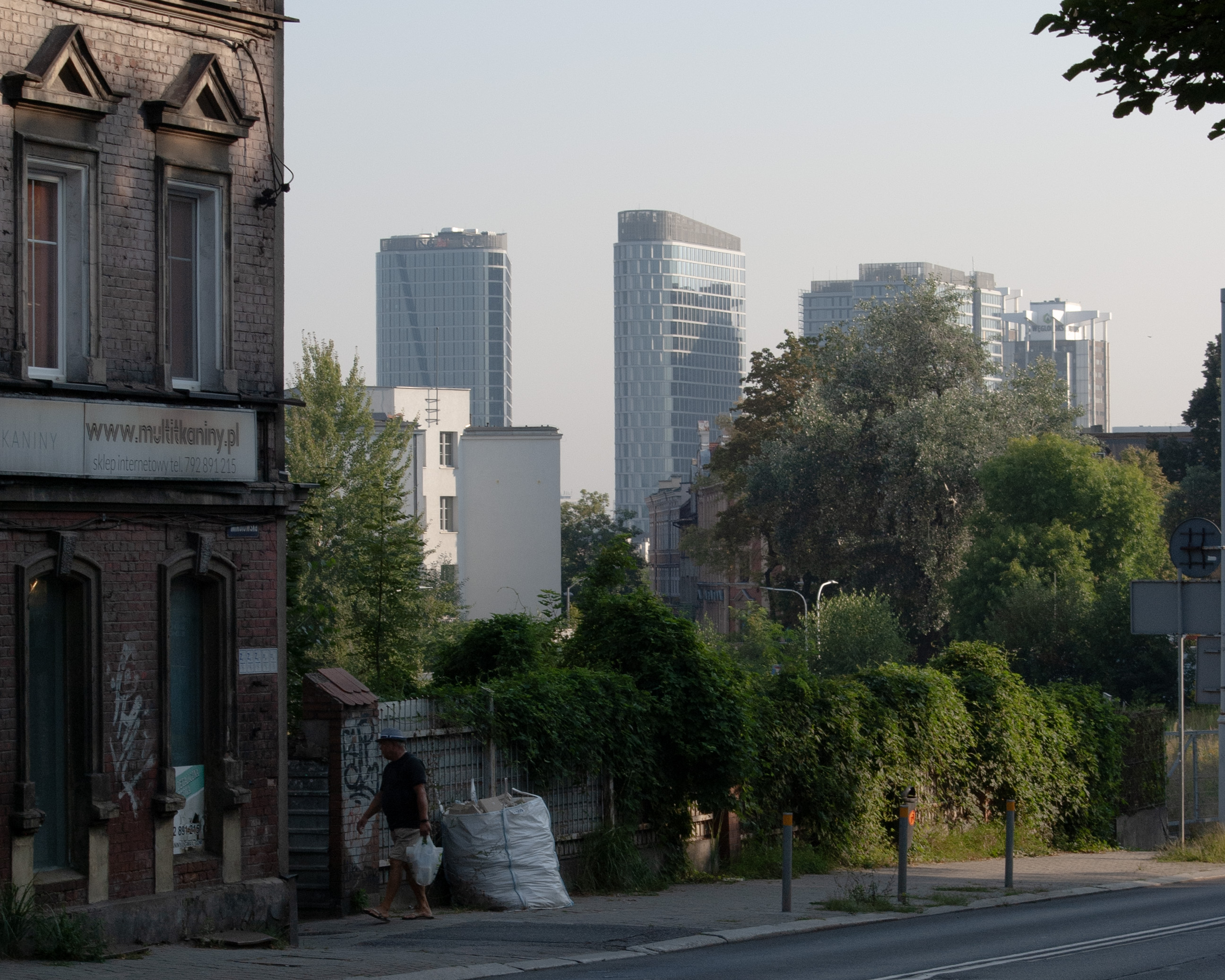
ING Hubs, an IT subsidiary of ING Group, is headquartered in Global Office Park in Katowice

As of August 2024, 252,841 people are employed in Katowice, which makes the city the 7th largest job market in Poland, slightly ahead of Gdańsk. Main sectors include professional services (including the IT sector and finance) at 15.8%, retail (13.7%), and government (12.6%). Unemployment rate is extremely low at 1%, as of June 2024.

Median monthly income for residents of Katowice stood at PLN 7,220.00 while median monthly income for those employed in Katowice was higher at PLN 8,053.30 as of August 2024, both above the country's median of PLN 6,697.52.

=== Business and commerce ===
Katowice is a large business, convention and trade fair centre. As of 2012, 44,050 businesses were registered in Katowice. 13 of them are traded on the Warsaw Stock Exchange, with ING Bank Śląski being the largest one by far, while 11 are traded on the NewConnect floor.

Name	Industry	Market cap (PLN millions)	Stock exchange
ING Bank Śląski	Financial services	39,420.30	Warsaw Stock Exchange
Tauron Polska Energia	Energy	7,669.16	Warsaw Stock Exchange
Grenevia	Renewable energy	1,336.13	Warsaw Stock Exchange
Introl	Industrial engineering	226.71	Warsaw Stock Exchange
Artifex Mundi	Gaming	208.35	Warsaw Stock Exchange
Farmy Fotowoltaiki Polska	Renewable energy	145.75	NewConnect
Bumech	Mechanical engineering	137.43	Warsaw Stock Exchange
Centurion Finance	Financial services	80.11	NewConnect
Polskie Towarzystwo Wspierania Przedsiębiorczości	Publishing	69.29	Warsaw Stock Exchange
Energoinstal	Industrial engineering	48.42	Warsaw Stock Exchange
Energoaparatura	Industrial engineering	48.40	Warsaw Stock Exchange
Fasing	Manufacturing	39.77	Warsaw Stock Exchange
JWW Invest	Energy	34.10	Warsaw Stock Exchange
Binary Helixs	Professional services	18.62	NewConnect
GKS Gieksa	Sports club	15.76	NewConnect
Telemedycyna Polska	Healthcare	14.74	NewConnect
Moj	Manufacturing	13.76	Warsaw Stock Exchange
Incuvo	Gaming	12.77	NewConnect
Jujubee	Gaming	10.33	NewConnect
Hornigold REIT	Real estate investing	6.92	NewConnect
Tax-Net	Professional services	5.86	NewConnect
Berg Holding	Real estate development	4.83	NewConnect
Regnon	Information technology	3.79	Warsaw Stock Exchange
Iron Wolf Studio	Gaming	1.72	NewConnect

Largest private corporations headquartered in Katowice include Polska Grupa Górnicza (coal mining and energy), Farmacol (pharmaceuticals), Famur (mining equipment manufacturing), Mistal (steel products manufacturing), Emiternet (renewable energy systems). Major international corporations with regional headquarters in Katowice include IBM, Unilever, PwC, Deloitte, Groupon, Eurofins, Capgemini, Sopra Steria, Accenture, Fujitsu, Citibank, HSBC, KPMG, RSM, Baker Tilly, and others.

Katowice is also the seat of Katowice Special Economic Zone (Katowicka Specjalna Strefa Ekonomiczna).

=== Heavy industry and manufacturing ===
Since its creation, Katowice's development was tightly connected to heavy industry, especially coal mining, steelworks and machine production. In 1931, 49.5% of inhabitants worked in industry, and 12.5% in coal mining alone. In 1989 industry accounted for 36% of all jobs in the city (112,000 employees). As of 2018, 34,294 people worked in industry in Katowice, 20.4% of total, below the national average.

The first reported coal mine in Katowice (Murcki coal mine) was established in 1740, and in 1769 construction on Emanuelssegen mine started. As the demand for coal kept rising in the Kingdom of Prussia, further mines were opened: Beata (1801), Ferdinand (1823), Kleofas (1845). Later in 19th and early 20th century additional mines were opened: Katowice, Wujek, Eminenz (later renamed Gottwald and merged with Kleofas), Wieczorek, Boże Dary, Staszic and renewed Murcki. Currently only one (Murcki-Staszic) remains in operation. Katowice is also the seat of Polska Grupa Górnicza, the largest coal mining corporation in Europe. Metallurgy was another important part of Katowice's economy. In 1863 a dozen zinc metallurgy facilities were reported in Katowice, with Wilhelmina (founded in 1834) being the largest. In early 1900s, Wilhelmina (later renamed Huta Metali Niezależnych Szopienice) was enlarged and became the largest Silesian producer of non-ferrous metals and world's largest producer of cadmium. Two major steelworks existed in the city: Huta Baildon, established in 1823 by the Scottish engineer and industrialist John Baildon (declared bankruptcy in 2001), and Huta Ferrum, established in 1874 and operating to this date in limited capacity.

=== Transport ===
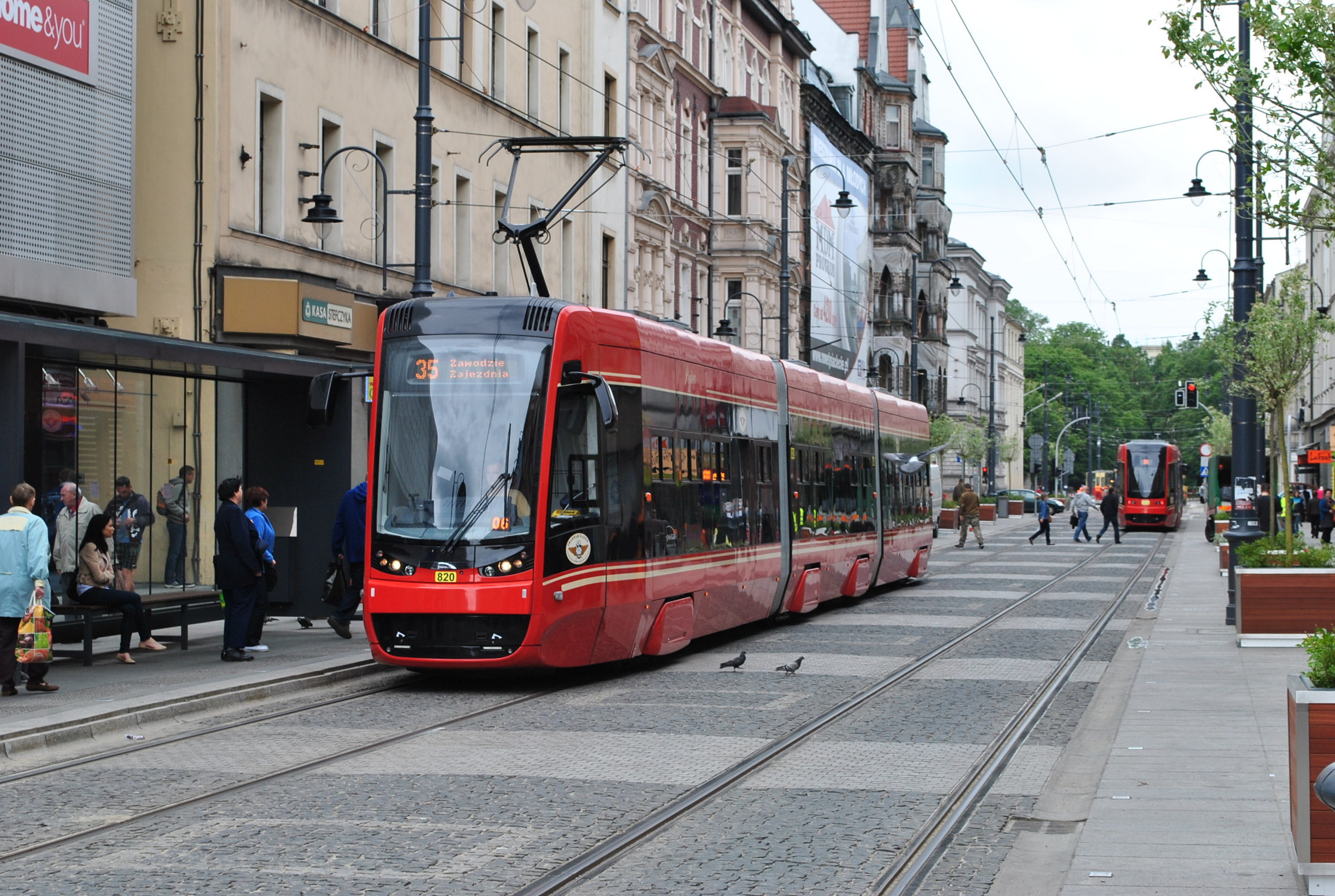
Pesa Twist tram in Katowice

The public transportation system of the Katowice consists of commuter and long-distance trains, trams, buses and city bikes. Around 38 percent of people in Katowice use trams and buses on their daily commute (40 percent if counted those using the park-and-ride facilities), 10 percent walk, 4 percent cycle, and 2 percent takes the train, according to a 2020 report. There are also three park-and-ride centers in Katowice with over 1,000 parking spaces. The transit authority of the Metropolis GZM, Zarząd Transportu Metropolitalnego (ZTM), operates the city trams and buses. Katowice has a modern international bus station located close to the city center.

Katowice is the main railway hub in southern Poland. Silesian Railways (Koleje Śląskie), a regional railway authority, connects Katowice with its suburbs and other major cities in Silesian and Lesser Poland voivodeships: Gliwice, Rybnik, Częstochowa, Bielsko-Biała, Kraków, and Oświęcim, among others. Polregio operates commuter trains from Katowice to cities and towns in Lesser Poland and Świętokrzyskie voivodeships: Trzebinia, Olkusz, and Kielce, among others.

Bolt and Blinkee operate commercial systems of scooter share. Traficar and Panek Car Share operate commercial carshare systems.

Katowice has a ring around its city center, consisting of highway A4, Murckowska freeway, Drogowa Trasa Średnicowa (a freeway-style road connecting downtowns of cities in the Katowice urban area) that partly goes in a tunnel underground and Bocheńskiego road. Many of the roads and freeways in Katowice expand radially from the city center and replaced old local roads. Main roads that pass through Katowice include; European route E40 that passes through Katowice as highway A4, National road 79 (DK79), National road 81 (DK81) enters Katowice from Mikołów, and National road 86 (DK86) enters Katowice from Sosnowiec as expressway S86 up until Roździeńskiego interchange where it meets DK79 and loses its expressway status.

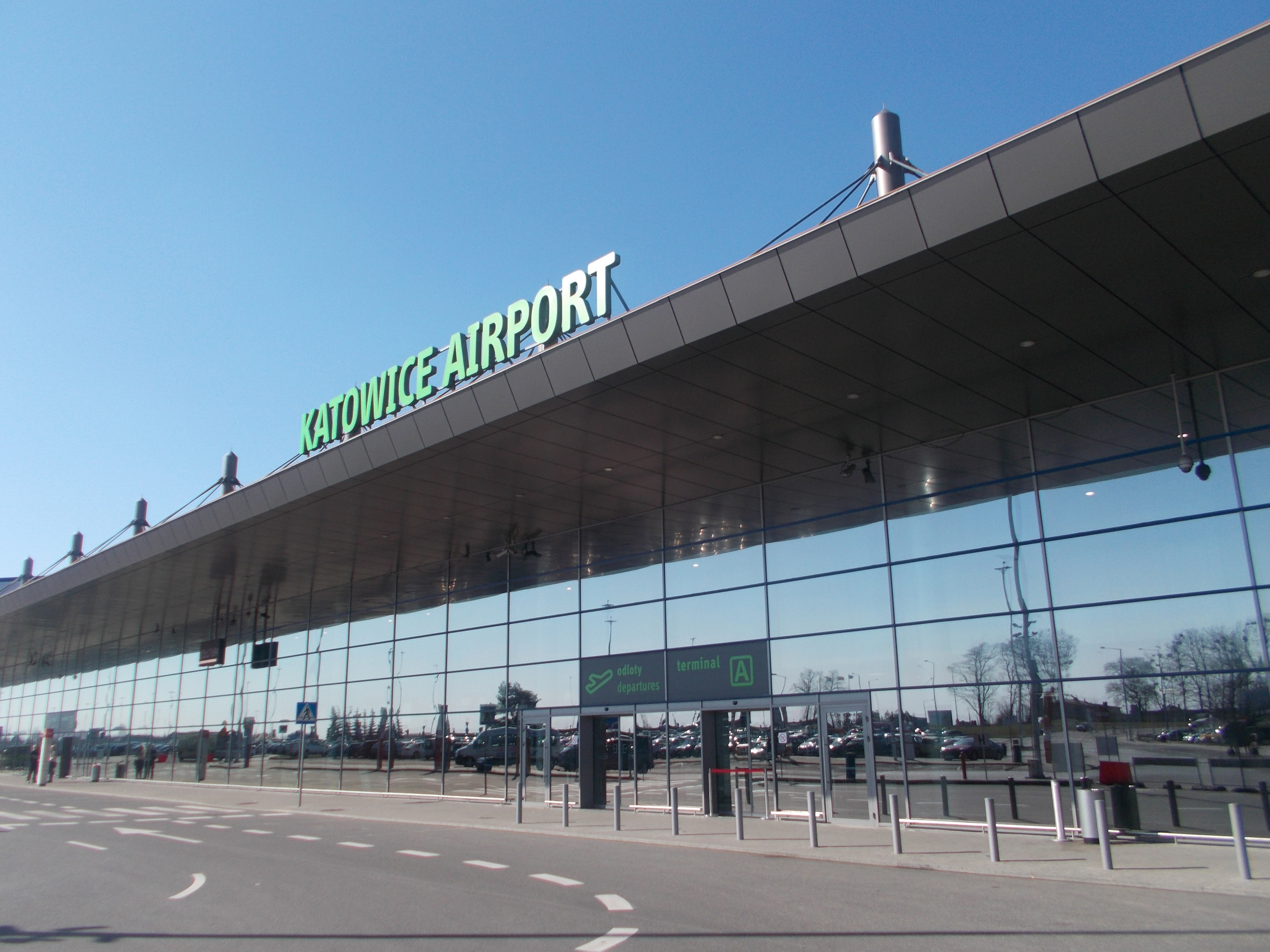
Katowice Airport

Located approximately 30 km (19 mi) north of the city center, Katowice Airport is the main airport serving Katowice. The airport is a focus city for LOT Polish Airlines, Ryanair and its subsidiary Buzz, Wizz Air, Smartwings, and Enter Air. Katowice is the largest leisure travel airport in Poland. The airport is accessed through a metropolitan express bus line, running every 30 minutes between 4am and 9:30pm and every hour at night. The airport is also accessible by train, with its own dedicated station.

Katowice is also within an hour drive from Kraków Airport, which offers additional destinations and airlines such as Amsterdam (KLM), Paris (Air France), Helsinki (Finnair), Chicago and Newark (LOT Polish Airlines), Copenhagen and Stockholm (SAS) and Zurich (Swiss). The airport can be accessed through scheduled buses leaving from Katowice bus station every 30–60 minutes.

== Culture ==
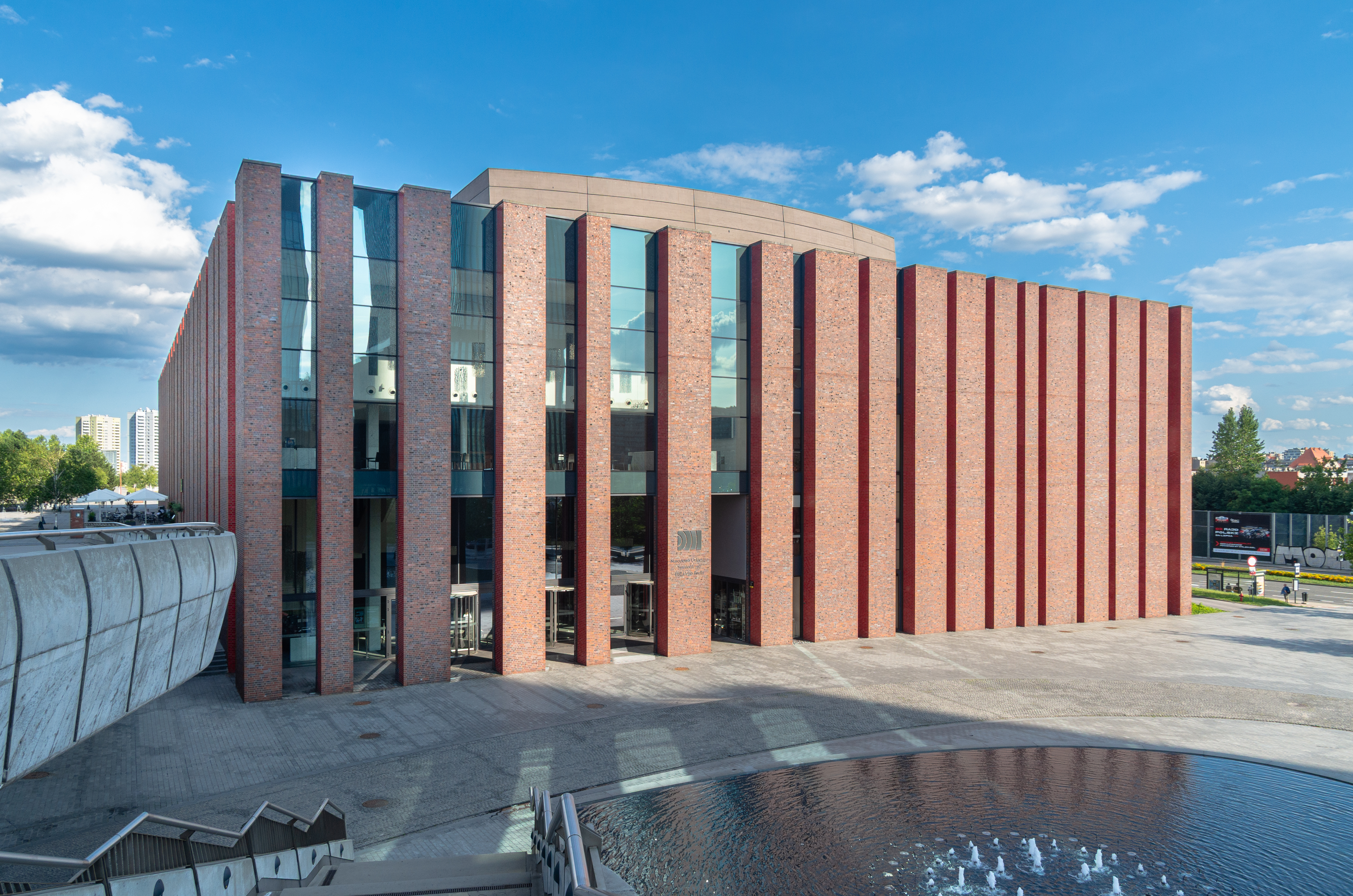
Polish National Radio Symphony Orchestra building

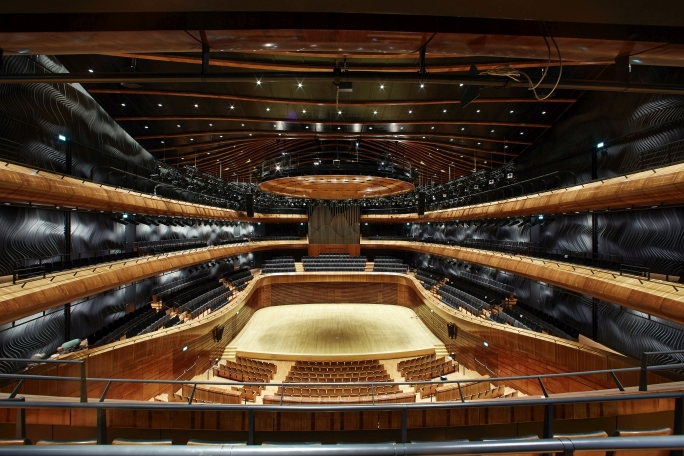
The Main Concert Hall

Vibrant and progressive artistic communities, particularly around musical arts, make Katowice one of the leading cultural spots in Poland. Since mid-2000s, Katowice has established a strategy to redevelop the post-industrial areas using culture – the pinnacle of which was a massive development on the site of a former coal mine known as Strefa Kultury (the "Zone of Culture"), where numerous cultural and convention institutions are located.

=== Performing arts ===
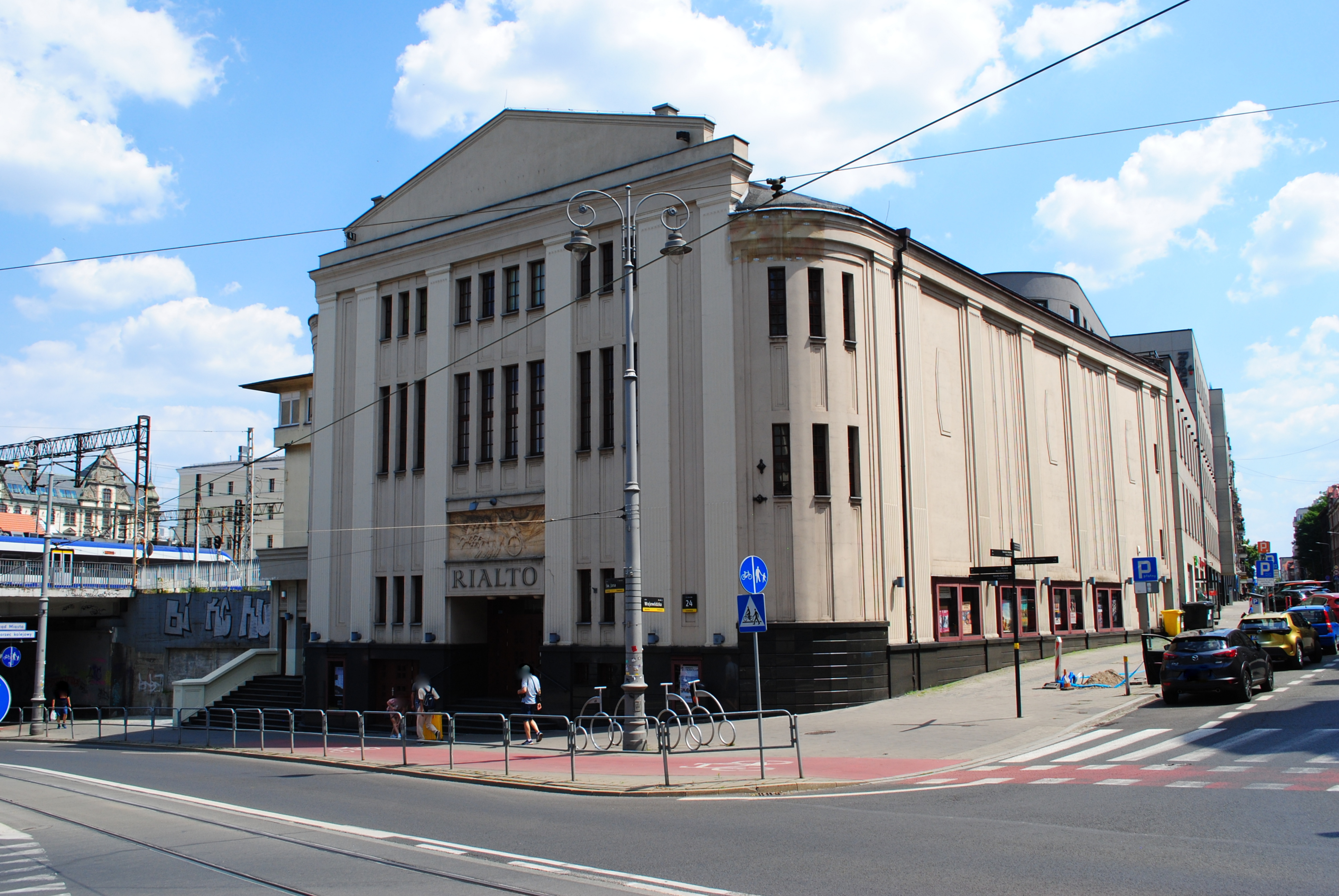
Kinoteatr Rialto

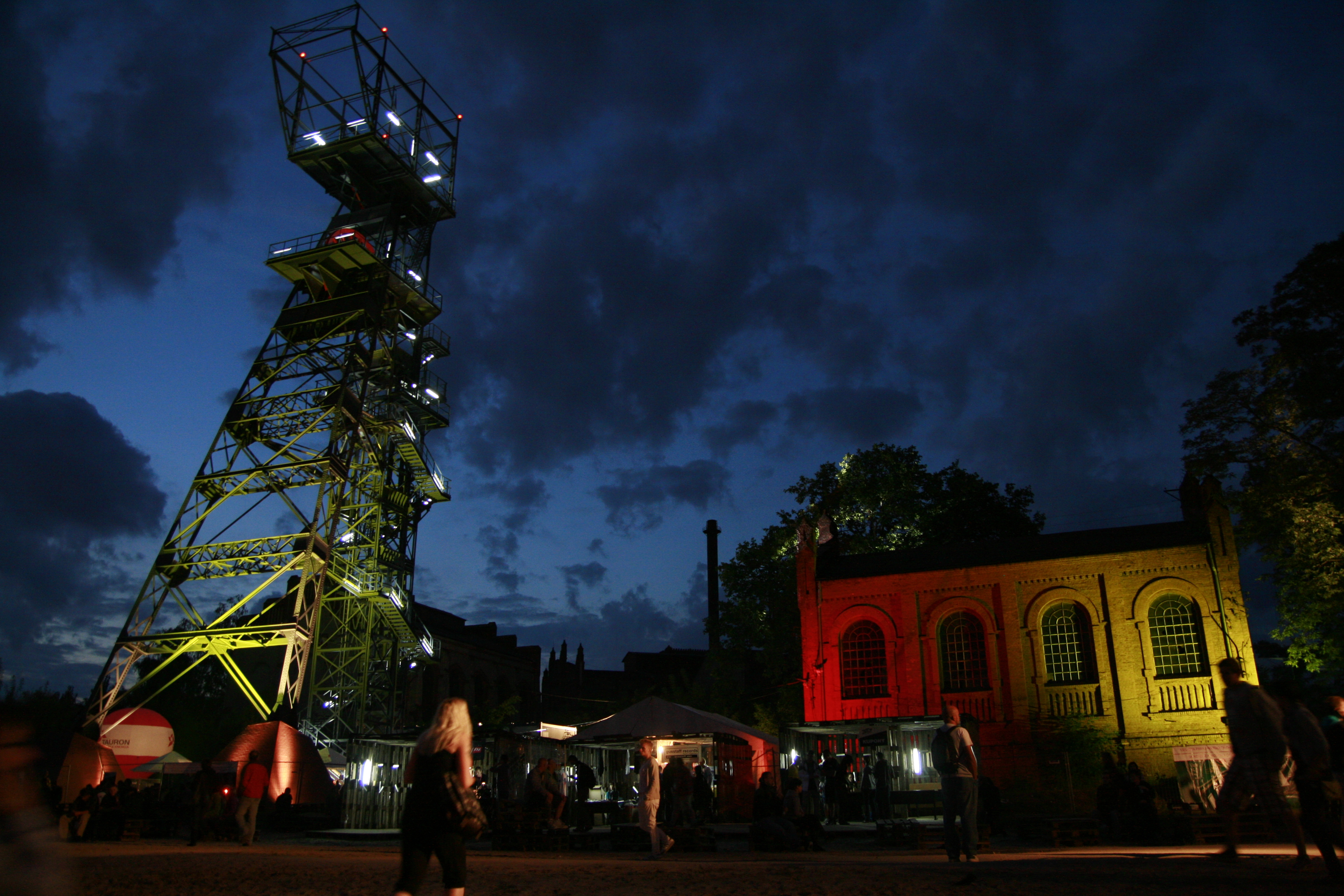
Tauron New Music Festival

Katowice's status as the UNESCO City of Music, designated when Katowice joined UNESCO Creative Cities Network in 2015, comes from a long and rich history of musical arts. Katowice is the seat of an internationally renowned Karol Szymanowski Academy of Music, whose faculty and graduates created the nationally important informal group called the Silesian school of composers. Polish National Radio Symphony Orchestra has been located in Katowice since 1945 and has gotten a new internationally acclaimed concert hall in 2014, built on a site of a former coal mine near Katowice's city center. The Silesian Philharmonic also has its seat in Katowice. The city is a venue for numerous classical concerts and festivals, such as: the International Festival of Young Music Competition Laureates, Grzegorz Fitelberg International Competition for Conductors, Chamber Music Festival, Ars Cameralis Festival and Katowice's opera, operettas and most of all ballet.

There are currently 6 theater buildings in Katowice, and some theater groups without a permanent location. Teatr Śląski is the oldest still-functioning theater in Katowice, first opened for audience in 1907 and located on the main square. It was the first theater to give plays in Silesian dialect of Polish. Every first Monday of the month, the Silesian Opera singers from nearby Bytom give a performance there, as Katowice does not have an opera house of its own. Teatr Ateneum is an important puppetry theater, while Teatr Korez was one of the first non-public theaters in post-war Poland.

Katowice is home to many nationally and internationally renowned popular music festivals. Rawa Blues, named after a stream that passes through Katowice's city center, is one of the largest blues festivals in Europe. Electronic music's Mayday Festival takes place every year in early November and is a sister event to its namesake in Dortmund. OFF Festival, dedicated to alternative music, moved to Katowice in 2010 and has been held every August. Tauron Nowa Muzyka festival, oriented more towards dance and techno has been named one of the major European festivals to attend. Other music festivals, such as the Silesian Jazz Festival, KatoHej (dedicated to chants and touristic music), and Gardens of Sound, are also organized. In 2019, 475,806 people attended various big cultural events such as concerts and festivals, which gave the city the third place in Poland, behind Warsaw and Kraków. Nearby Chorzów, with the Silesian Stadium right across the street from Katowice, gathered another 319,783 attendees.

Performing arts events include (or included in the past); Metalmania, International Competition of Conductors by Fitelberg, International Cycling Film Festival, International Festival of Military Orchestras and International Exhibition of Graphic arts "Intergrafia". Katowice is also a renowned hub for eSports events, that include the Intel Extreme Masters World Championship tournament, one of the biggest esports events in the world. Wikimania 2024 was also held at the International Congress Centre between 7-10 August 2014.

=== Museums and art galleries ===
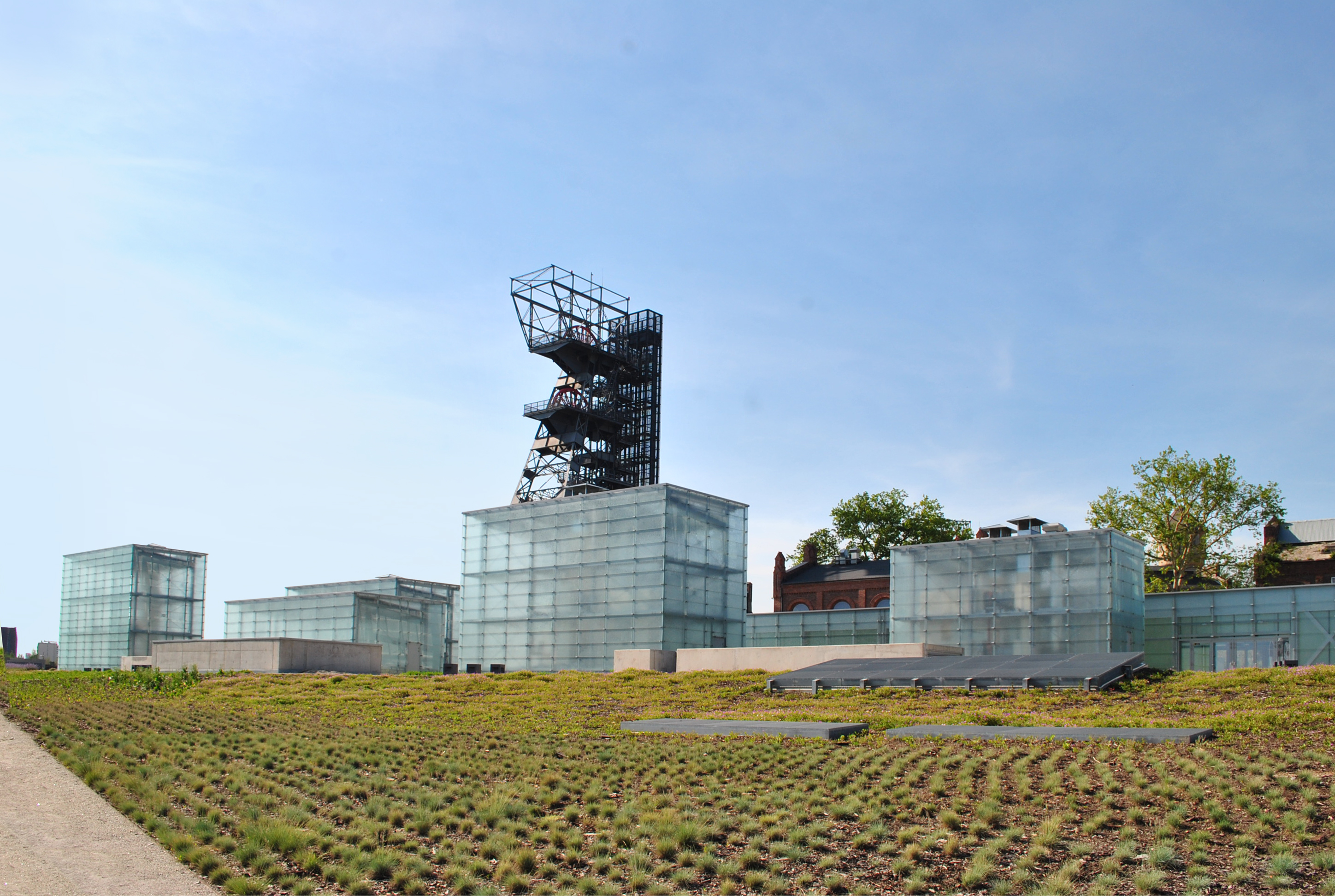
New complex of the Silesian Museum with an original mine headframe

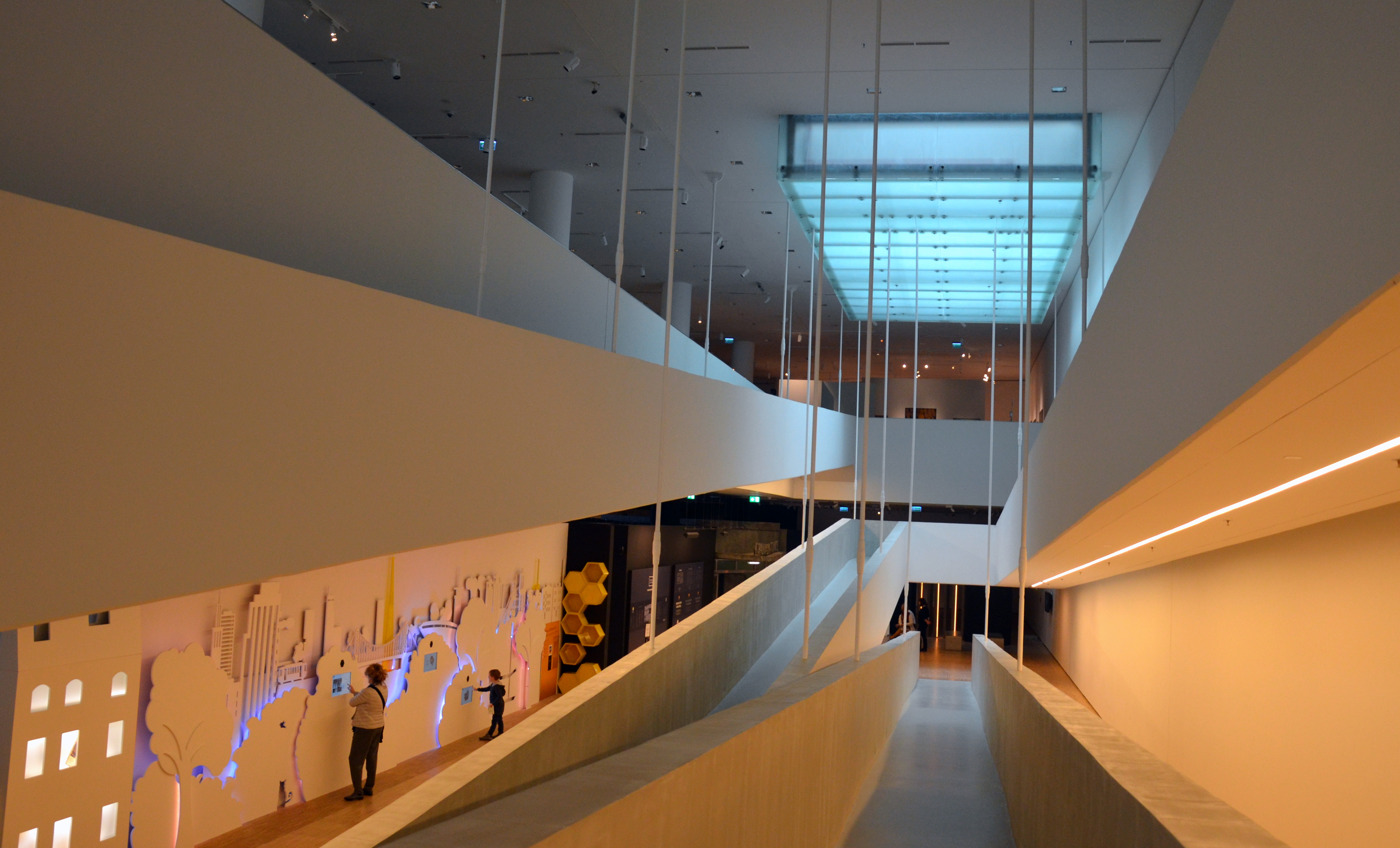
Museum exhibition hall

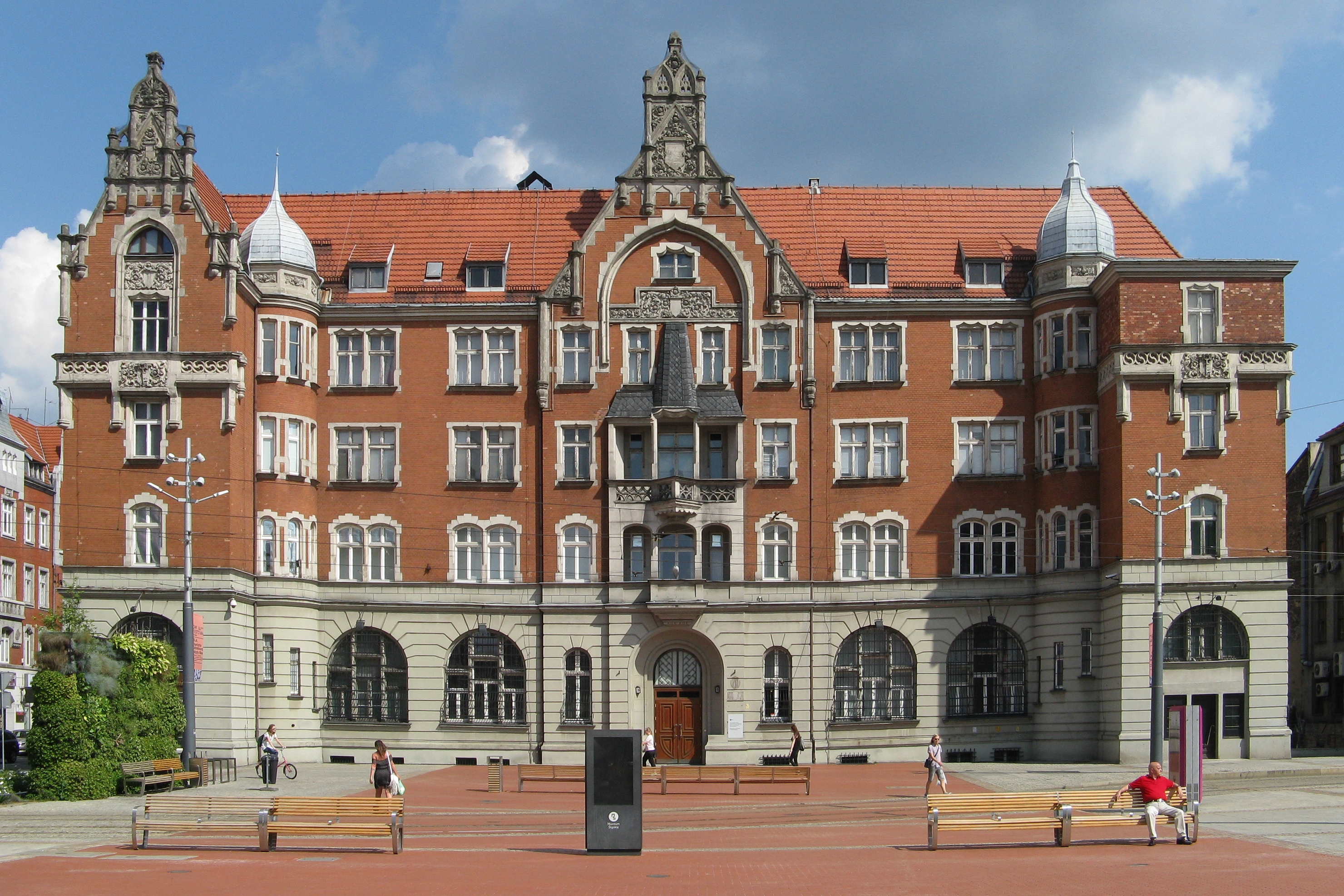
Old building of Silesian Museum

The Silesian Museum is the largest and most-important museum in Katowice. It originally opened in 1929, and its radically modern, Bauhaus-style new building was demolished immediately after the Nazis seized Katowice in 1939, considering it too degenerate and too Polish. The museum has been placed in temporary buildings with its collections dispersed until 2015, when a new, mostly underground building has been constructed in the Zone of Culture. The museum exhibits works by famous and renowned Polish artists like Józef Chełmoński, Artur Grottger, Tadeusz Makowski, Jacek Malczewski, Jan Matejko, Józef Mehoffer and Stanisław Wyspiański. It is also well known for its collection of naïve art paintings, including local coal miners from Katowice area. The museum has a number of sketches of globally recognizable artists such as Albrecht Dürer and Rembrandt.

The City History Museum of Katowice exhibitions include: immersive typical urban apartments from early 20th century, naïve art paintings from local artists and the history of Katowice from a village to an industrial center. Other museums in Katowice include Museum of the History of Computers and Informatics and the Museum of Smallest Books in the World.

The BWA Contemporary Art Gallery in Katowice, established in 1949, is a notable institution concerning the Contemporary arts. Every three years, it is responsible for organizing the Polish Graphic Art Triennial. Several other galleries feature exhibitions of the works by artists from abroad along with film screenings, workshops for children and public fairs.

=== Media ===
Local TV includes TVP 3 Katowice and regionally Silesian-spoken TVS (TV Silesia). Radio includes the local branch of Polish Radio, Radio Katowice.

=== Parks and squares ===
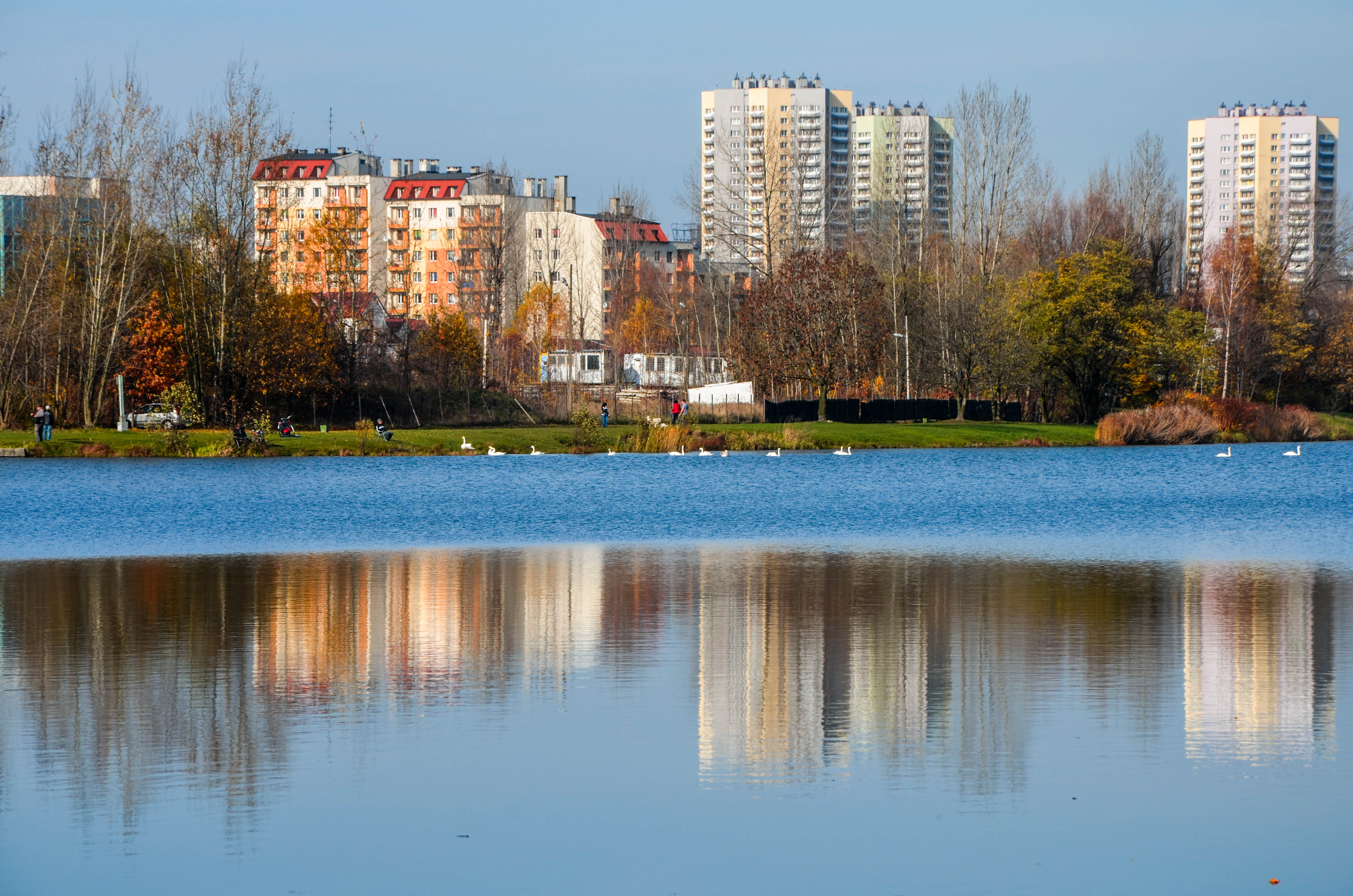
Valley of Three Ponds

parks:

- Silesian Park (Wojewódzki Park Kultury i Wypoczynku)
- Kościuszko Park (Park im. Tadeusza Kościuszki)
- Forest Park of Katowice (Katowicki Park Leśny)
- Valley of Three Ponds (Dolina Trzech Stawów)
- Zadole Park

squares:

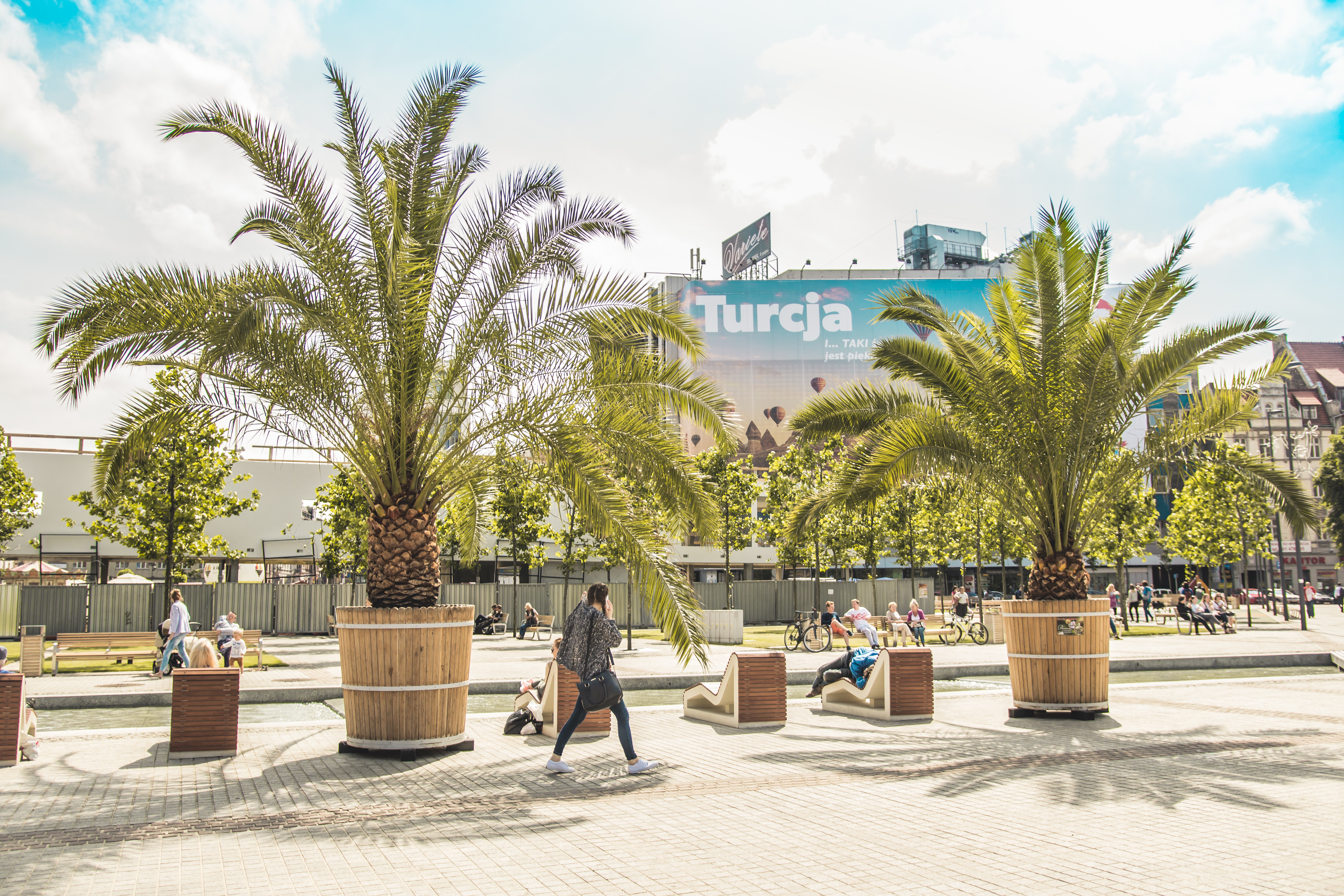
- Palms on Katowice market square during summer holidays
  Katowice market square (Rynek w Katowicach)
- Freedom Square (Plac Wolności)
- Andrzej Square (Plac Andrzeja)
- Miarka Square (Plac Miarki)
- Council of Europe Square (Plac Rady Europy)
- Alfred Square (Plac Alfreda)
- A. Budniok Square (Plac A. Brudnioka)
- J. Londzin Square (Plac J. Londzina)
- A. Hlond Square (Plac A. Hlonda)

=== Nature reserves and ecological areas ===
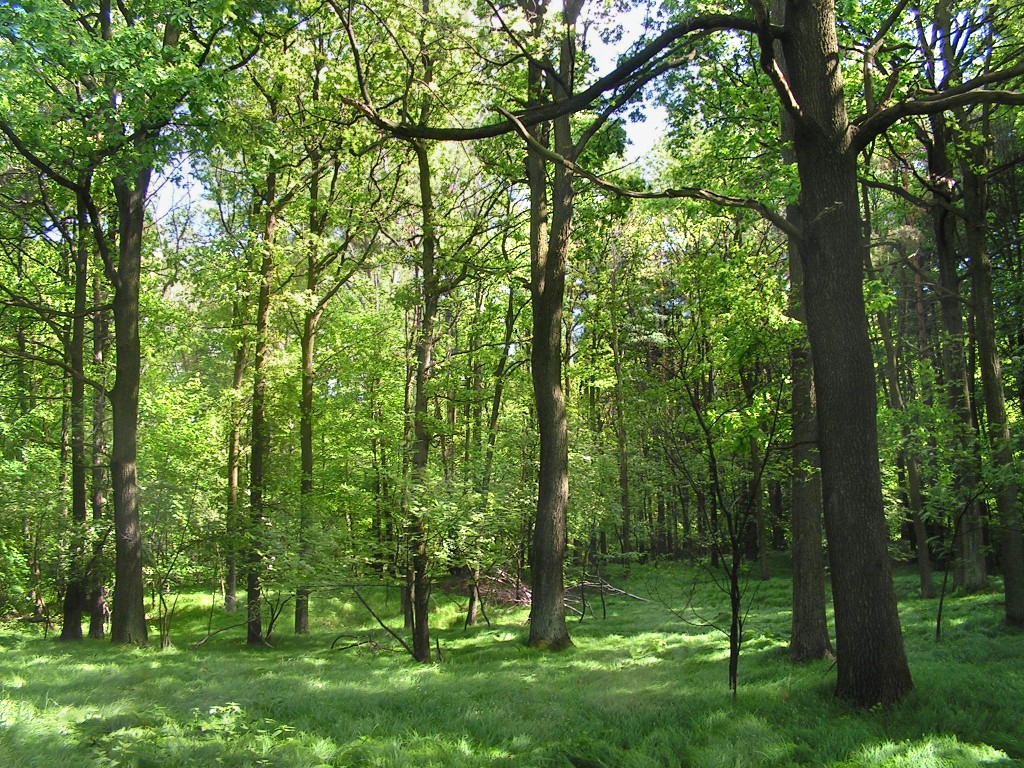
Las Murckowski

- Nature reserve Las Murckowski
- Nature reserve Ochojec
- Szopienice-Borki
- Źródła Kłodnicy
- Staw Grunfeld
- Stawy Na Tysiącleciu
- Płone Bagno

=== Education and science ===
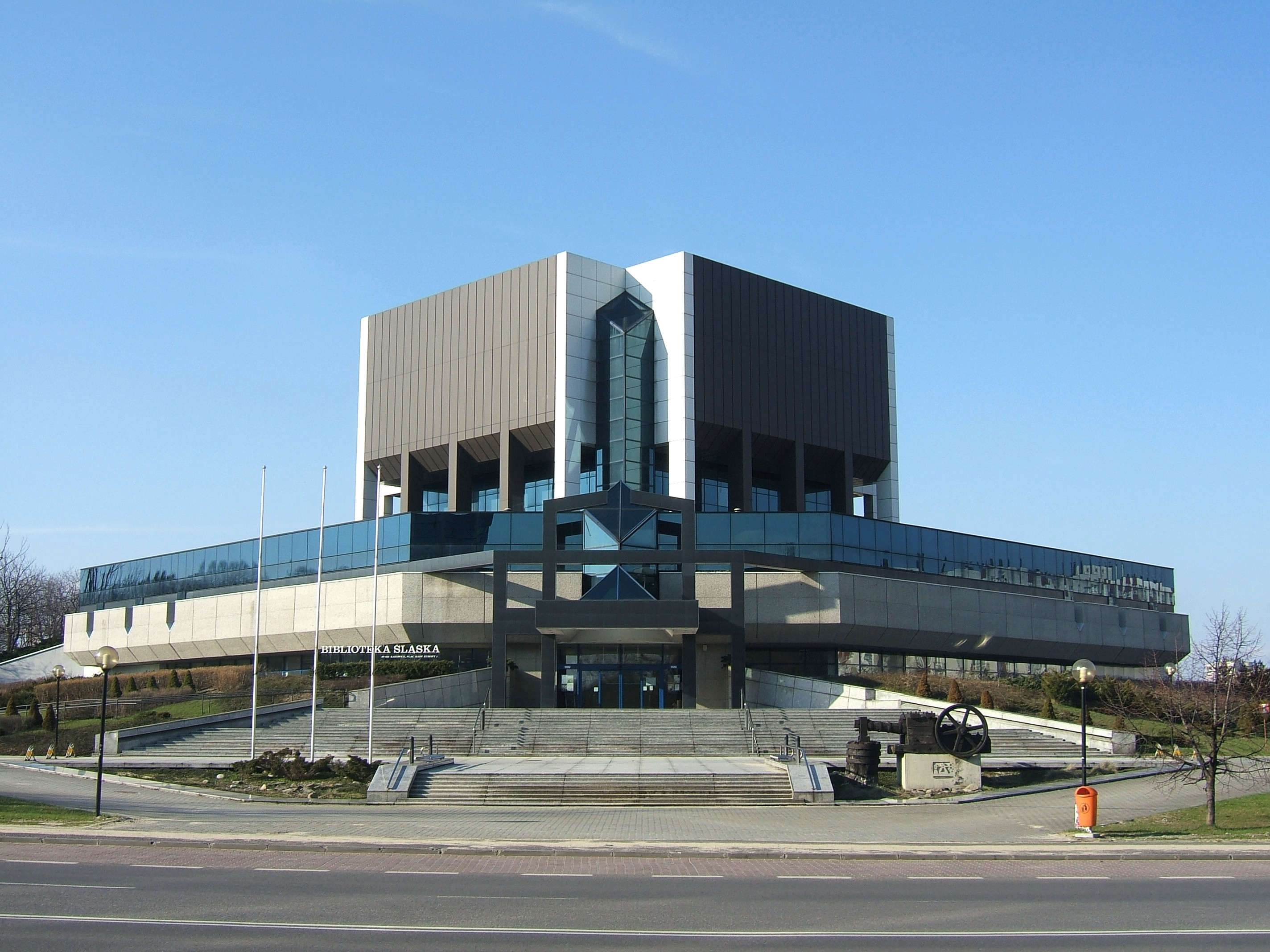
Silesian Library in Katowice

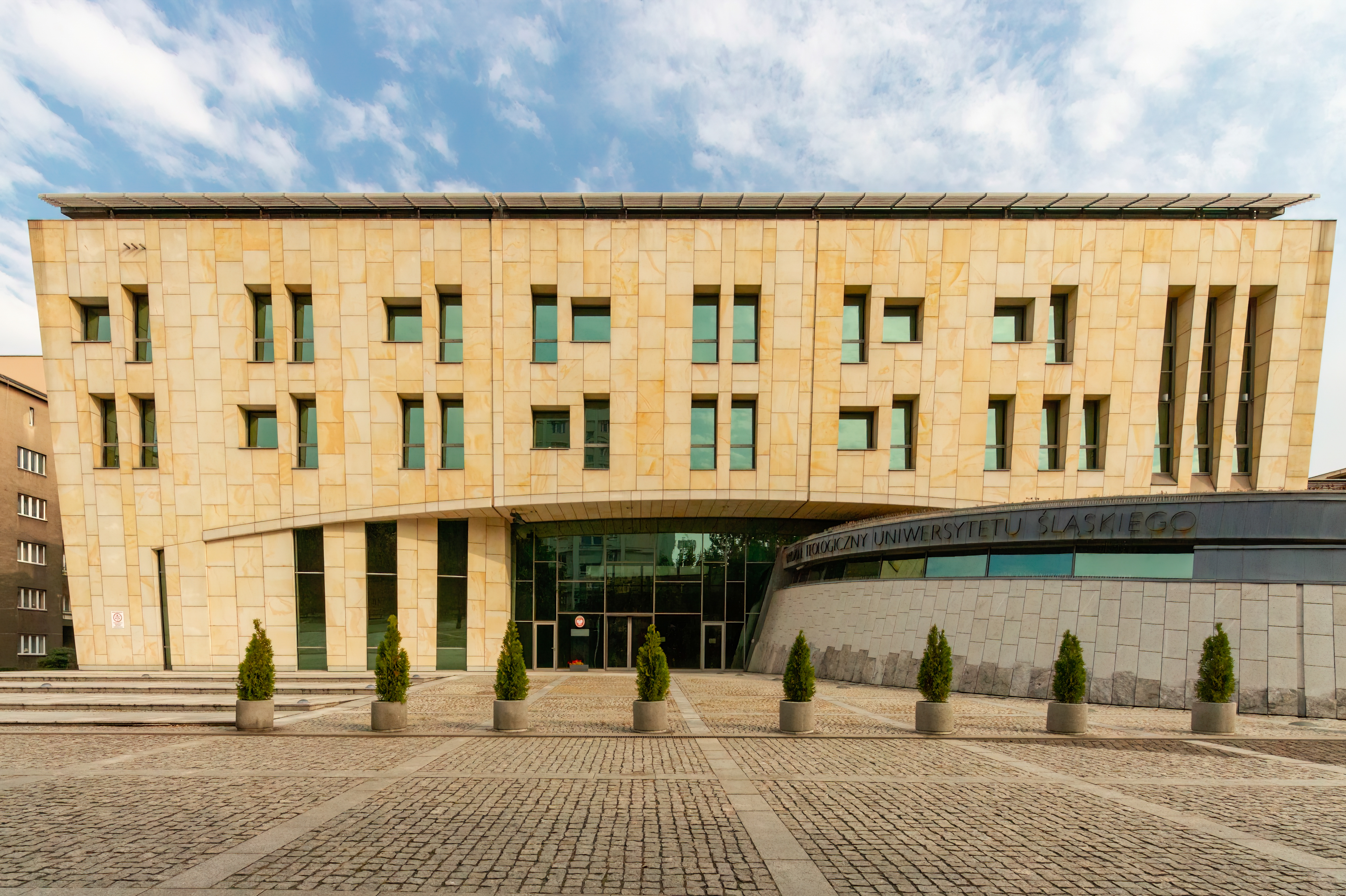
Silesian University – Faculty of Theology

Katowice is a large scientific centre and has been designated as the European City of Science 2024 by EuroScience (ESOF). It has over 20 schools of higher education, at which over 100,000 people study.

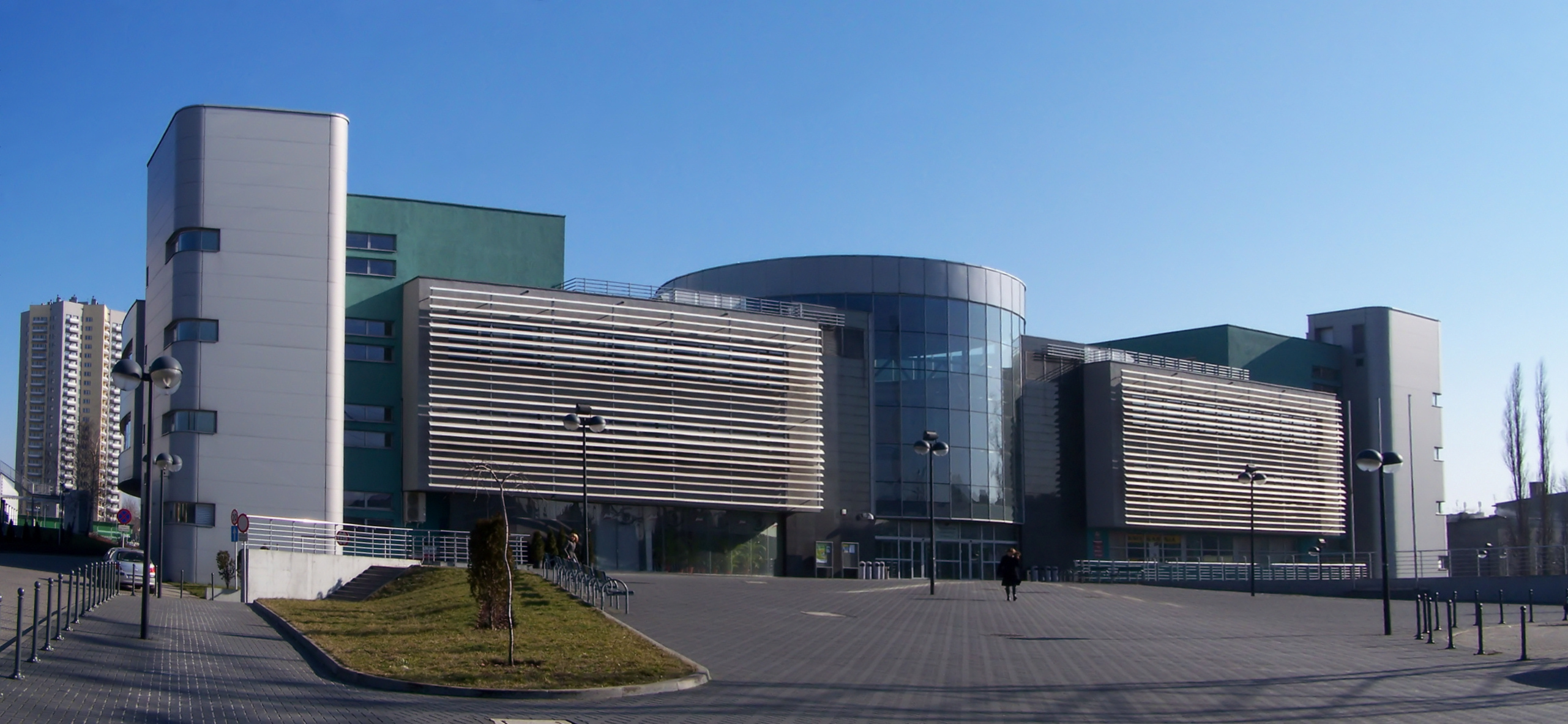
University of Silesia in Katowice – Faculty of Law and Administration

- University of Silesia in Katowice
- University of Economics in Katowice
- Medical University of Silesia
- Silesian University of Technology
- University of Social Sciences and Humanities
- Karol Szymanowski Academy of Music
- Academy of Fine Arts in Katowice
- Academy of Physical Education im. Jerzy Kukuczka in Katowice
- Higher Silesian Seminary in Katowice

There are also:

- around 80 high schools
- around 35 gimnasia
- around 55 primary schools
- around 50 libraries, including the Silesian Library

== Sports ==
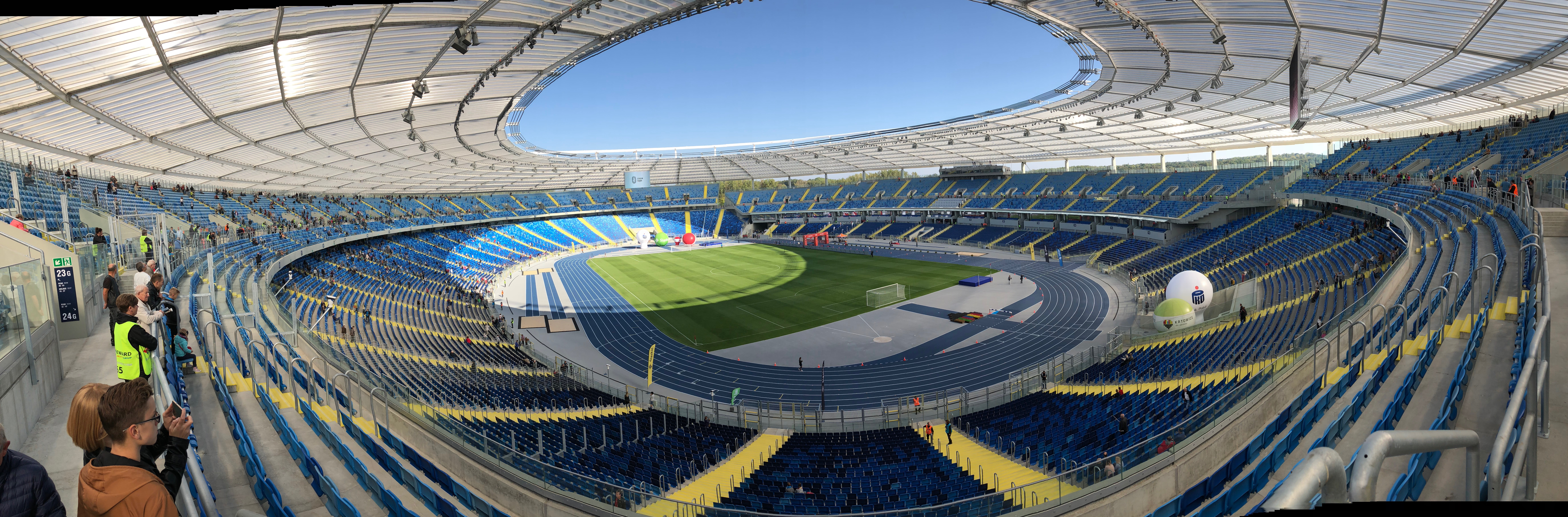
Stadion Śląski

Katowice has a long sporting tradition and hosted the final of EuroBasket 2009 and 1975 European Athletics Indoor Championships, 1975 European Amateur Boxing Championships, 1976 World Ice Hockey Championships, 1957, 1985 European Weightlifting Championships, 1974, 1982 World Wrestling Championships, 1991 World Amateur Bodybuilding Championships, 2011 Women's European Union Amateur Boxing Championships, 2014 FIVB Men's World Championship and others.

The Stadion Śląski is between Chorzów and Katowice. It was a national stadium of Poland, with more than 50 international matches of the Poland national football team played here and around 30 matches in UEFA competitions. There were also a Speedway World Championship, Speedway Grand Prix of Europe and many concerts featuring international stars.

Tourists can relax playing tennis or squash, doing water sports also sailing (for example—in Dolina Trzech Stawów), horse-riding (in Wesoła Fala and Silesian Park), cycling or going to one of equipped fitness clubs. Near the city centre are sporting facilities like swimming pools (for example "Bugla", "Rolna") and in neighbourhood—Golf courses (in Siemianowice Śląskie).

=== Sports clubs ===
- GKS Katowice – men's football, ice hockey, volleyball, women's football club (Polish Football League Runners-Up (4): 1988, 1989, 1992, 1994 Polish Cup Winners (3): 1986, 1991, 1993; Polish Super Cup Winners (2): 1991, 1995; Polish Ice Hockey League Champions (8): 1958, 1960, 1962, 1965, 1968, 1970, 2022, 2023; Polish Women's Football League Winners (1): 2023, Runners-Up (1): 2024, Polish Women’s Cup Winners (1): 2024.
- 1. FC Katowice - men’s and women’s football club
- AZS AWF Katowice – various sports, women's handball team playing in Polish Women's Handball Superleague, men's basketball team playing in the second league, fencing section – many medals in the Polish Championship
- Naprzód Janów Katowice – hockey club playing in Polish Hockey Superleague, vice-champion of Poland (5x): 1971, 1973, 1977, 1989, 1992; bronze medal (7x): 1972, 1974, 1976, 1978, 1982, 1986, 1987; Polish Cup (1x): 1970.
- AZS US Katowice – various sports, many medals in the Polish Championship in various sports
- HKS Szopienice – various sports, many medals in the Polish and Europe and World Championship in weightlifting
- Silesia Miners – American football club playing in Polish American Football League, Polish champion in 2009, vice-champion in 2007
- Jango Katowice – futsal club playing in Polish Futsal Superleague; Polish Cup (1x): 2007; bronze medal Polish Championship (2x): 2001, 2007
- Rozwój Katowice – football club playing in Polish Third League
- MK Katowice – football club playing in Polish Fourth League
- Hetman Szopienice – chess club, many medals in the Polish Championship
- Sparta Katowice – various sports, many medals in the Polish Championship in various sports
- Policyjny Klub Sportowy Katowice – various sports, many medals in the Polish Championship in various sports
- AWF Mickiewicz Katowice – basketball club
- Silesian Flying club (Aeroklub Śląski)

Defunct sports clubs:

- Diana Kattowitz – football club
- 1. FC Kattowitz – football club, vice-champion of Poland: 1927; champion of Upper Silesia: 1907, 1908, 1909, 1913, 1922, 1932, 1945
- Germania Kattowitz – football club
- KS Baildon Katowice – various sports, many medals in the Polish Championship in various sports
- Pogoń Katowice – various sports, many medals in the Polish Championship in various sports

=== Sports events ===
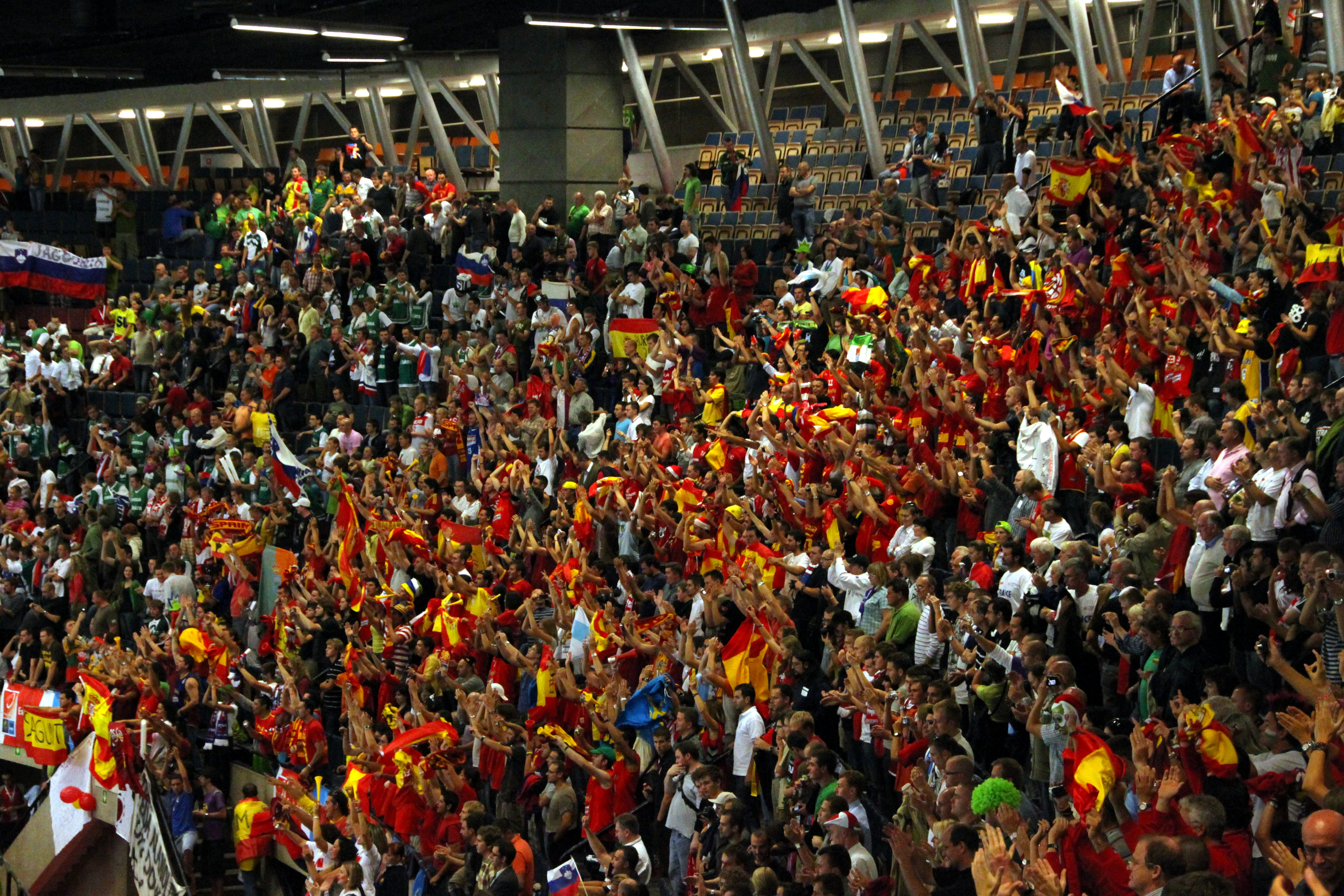
Spanish fans at the EuroBasket 2009 in Katowice

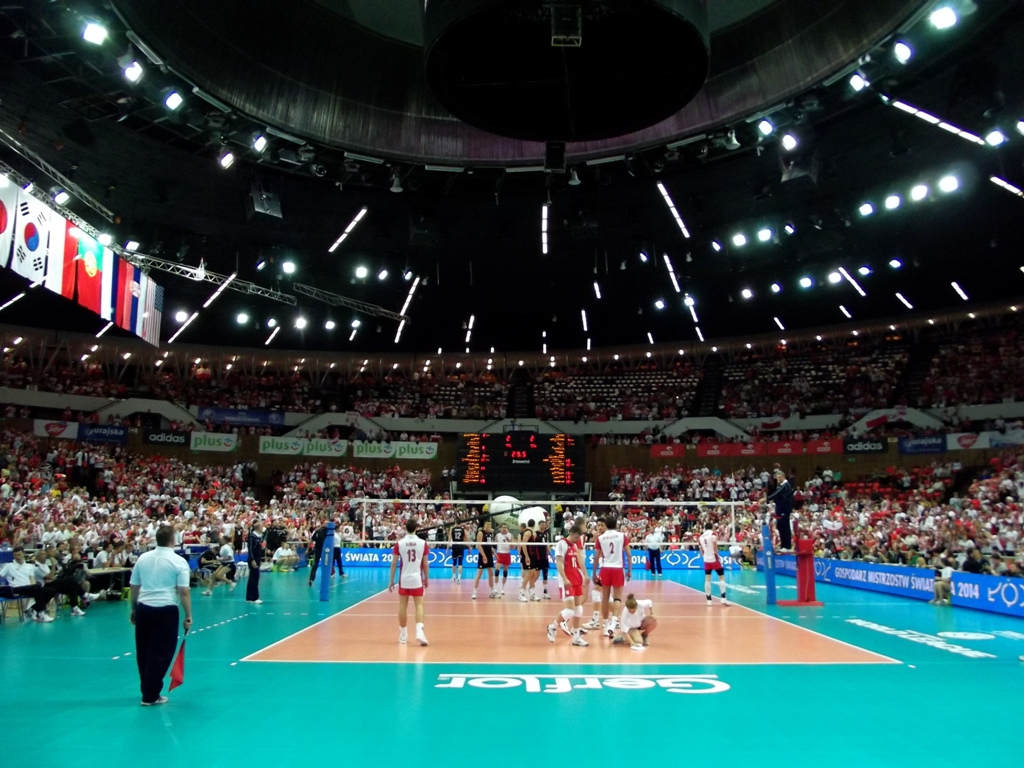
2012 FIVB Volleyball World League match in Katowice

- 1975 European Athletics Indoor Championships
- 1976 World Ice Hockey Championships
- FIVB World League 2001
- FIVB World League 2007
- Eurobasket 2009
- Tour de Pologne 2010
- BNP Paribas Katowice Open
- EMS One Katowice 2014 (CS:GO Major Championship)
- IEM World Championship Katowice 2015
- ESL One Katowice 2015 (CS:GO Major Championship)
- IEM World Championship Katowice 2016
- IEM World Championship Katowice 2017
- Overwatch World Cup 2017 Qualifier
- IEM World Championship Katowice 2018
- IEM World Championship Katowice 2019 (CS:GO Major Championship)
- ESL One Katowice 2019
- BWF World Senior Badminton Championships 2019
- IEM Katowice 2020
- IEM Katowice 2021
- Intel Extreme Masters Season XVI – Katowice
- Intel Extreme Masters Katowice 2023
- ESL Pro League Season 24 Finals

== Notable people ==
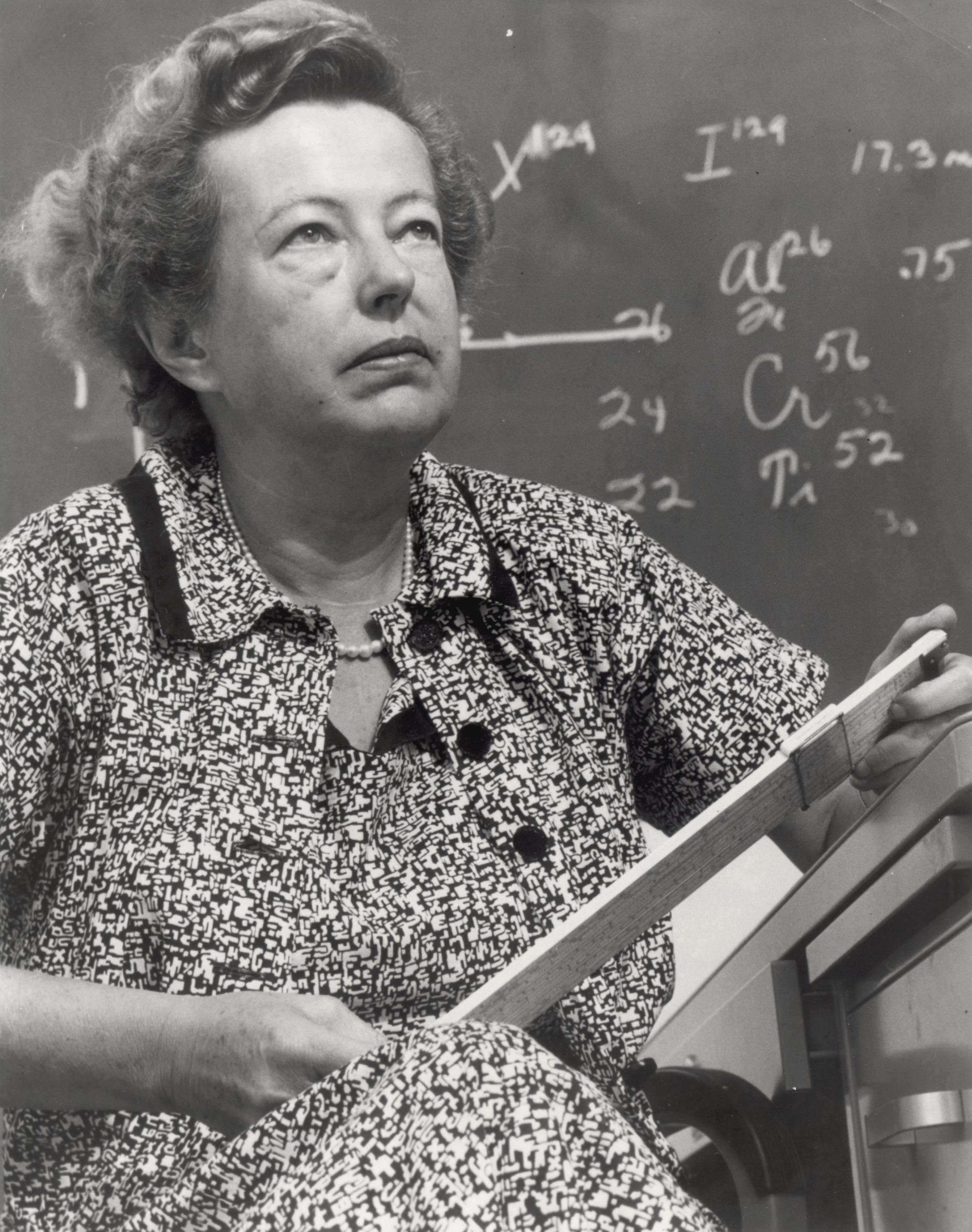
Maria Goeppert Mayer

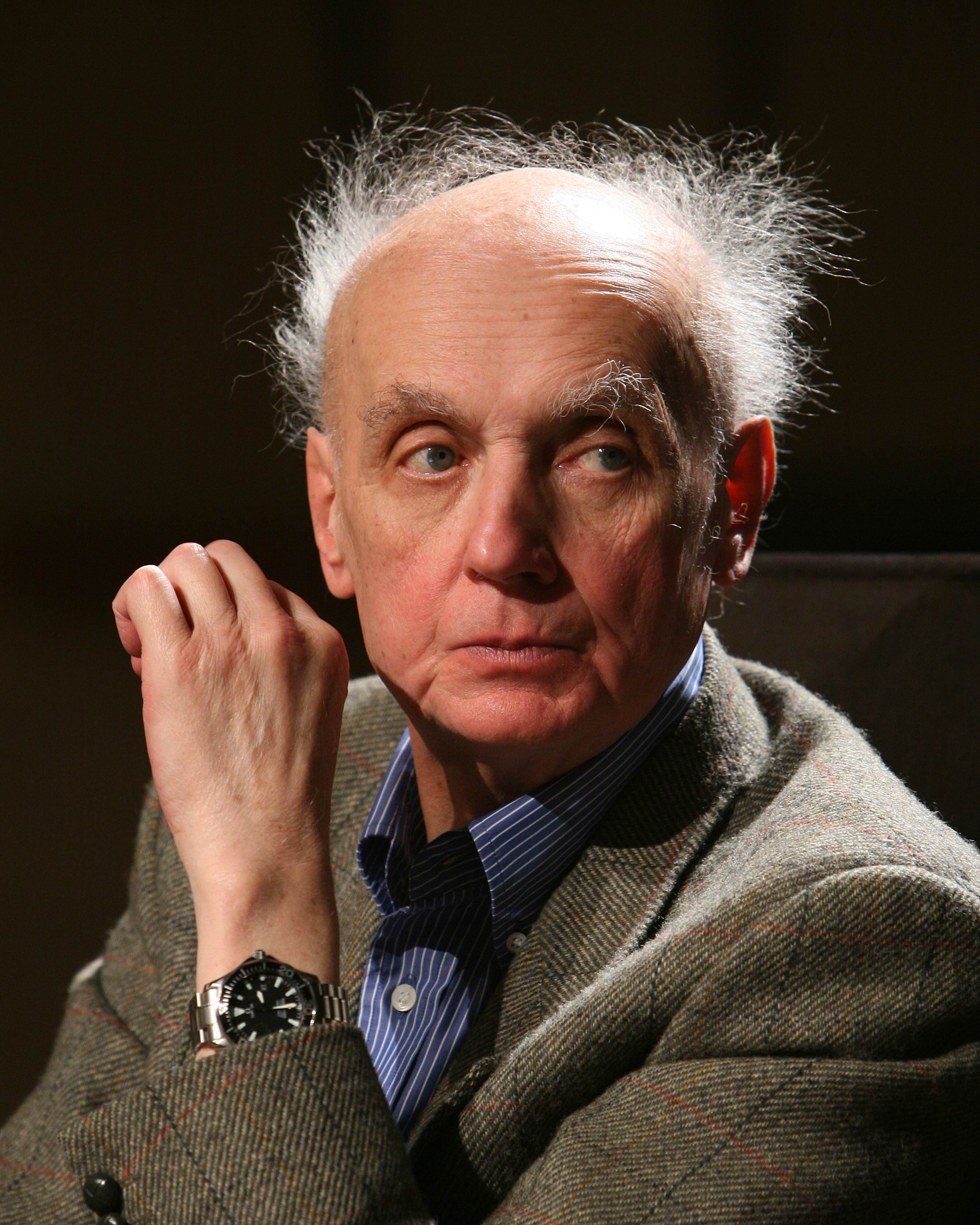
Wojciech Kilar

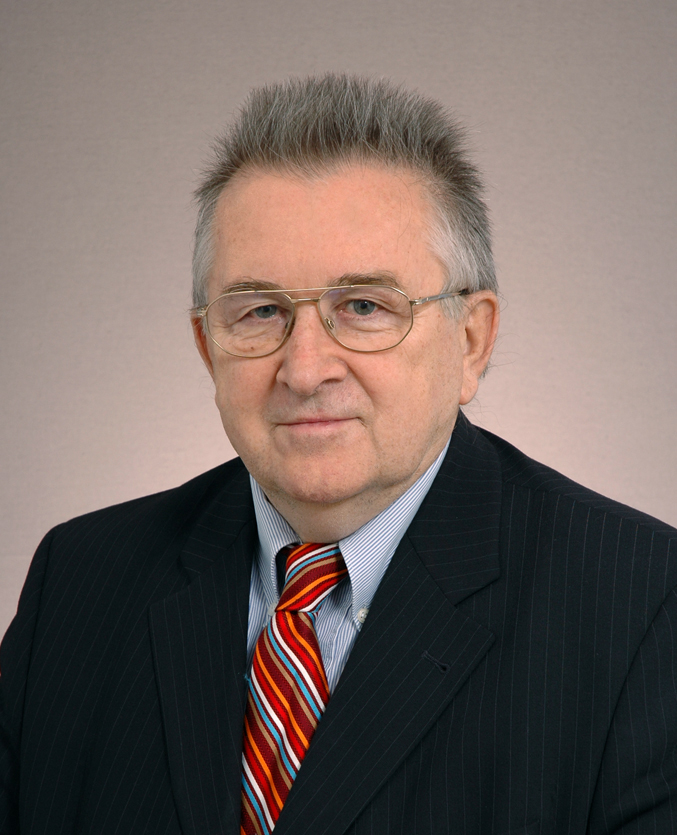
Kazimierz Kutz

- Hans Sachs (1877–1945), serologist
- Kurt Goldstein (1878–1965), neurologist
- Erich Przywara (1889–1972), priest
- Hans Mikosch (1898–1993), general
- Hans Källner (1898–1945), general
- Franz Leopold Neumann (1900–1954), politician
- Willy Fritsch (1901–1973), actor
- Hans Bellmer (1902–1975), surrealist photographer
- Hans-Christoph Seebohm (1903–1967), politician
- Maria Goeppert-Mayer (1906–1972), physicist, Nobel Prize winner
- Kurt Schwaen (1909–2007), composer
- Rudolf Schnackenburg (1914–2002), priest
- Georg Thomalla (1915–1999), actor
- Ernst Wilimowski (1916–1997), football player
- Ernst Plener (1919–2007), football player
- Anneli Cahn Lax (1922–1999), mathematician
- Richard Herrmann (1923–1962), football player
- Chaskel Besser (1923–2010), Orthodox rabbi
- Gwendoline Jarczyk (1927–2021), philosopher and historian
- Kazimierz Kutz (1929–2018), film director and politician
- Waldemar Świerzy (1931–2013), artist, illustrator and cartoonist
- Wojciech Kilar (1932–2013), classical and film music composer
- Henryk Górecki (1933–2010), classical composer
- Władysław Masłowski (1933–1986), journalist and press researcher
- Janusz Sidło (1933–1993), javelin thrower
- Tadeusz Strugała (born 1935), orchestra conductor
- Josef Kompalla (born 1936), ice hockey player and referee
- Jolanta Wadowska-Król (1939–2023), pediatrician
- Henryk Broder (born 1946), journalist
- Krzysztof Krawczyk (1946–2021), singer, guitarist and composer
- Jerzy Kukuczka (1948–1989), alpine and high altitude climber
- Krzysztof R. Apt (born 1949), computer scientist
- Joanna Kluzik-Rostkowska (born 1963), politician
- Elżbieta Bieńkowska (born 1964), politician
- Robert Konieczny (born 1969), architect
- Anna Kańtoch (born 1976), writer
- Alicja Kwade (born 1979), contemporary visual artist
- Jan P. Matuszyński (born 1984), film director
- Grzegorz Kosok (born 1986), volleyball player
- Zuzanna Bijoch (born 1994), fashion model
- Michał Woźniak (born 1999), pair skater
- Mateusz Musiałowski (born 2003), footballer

== International relations ==
=== Consulates ===
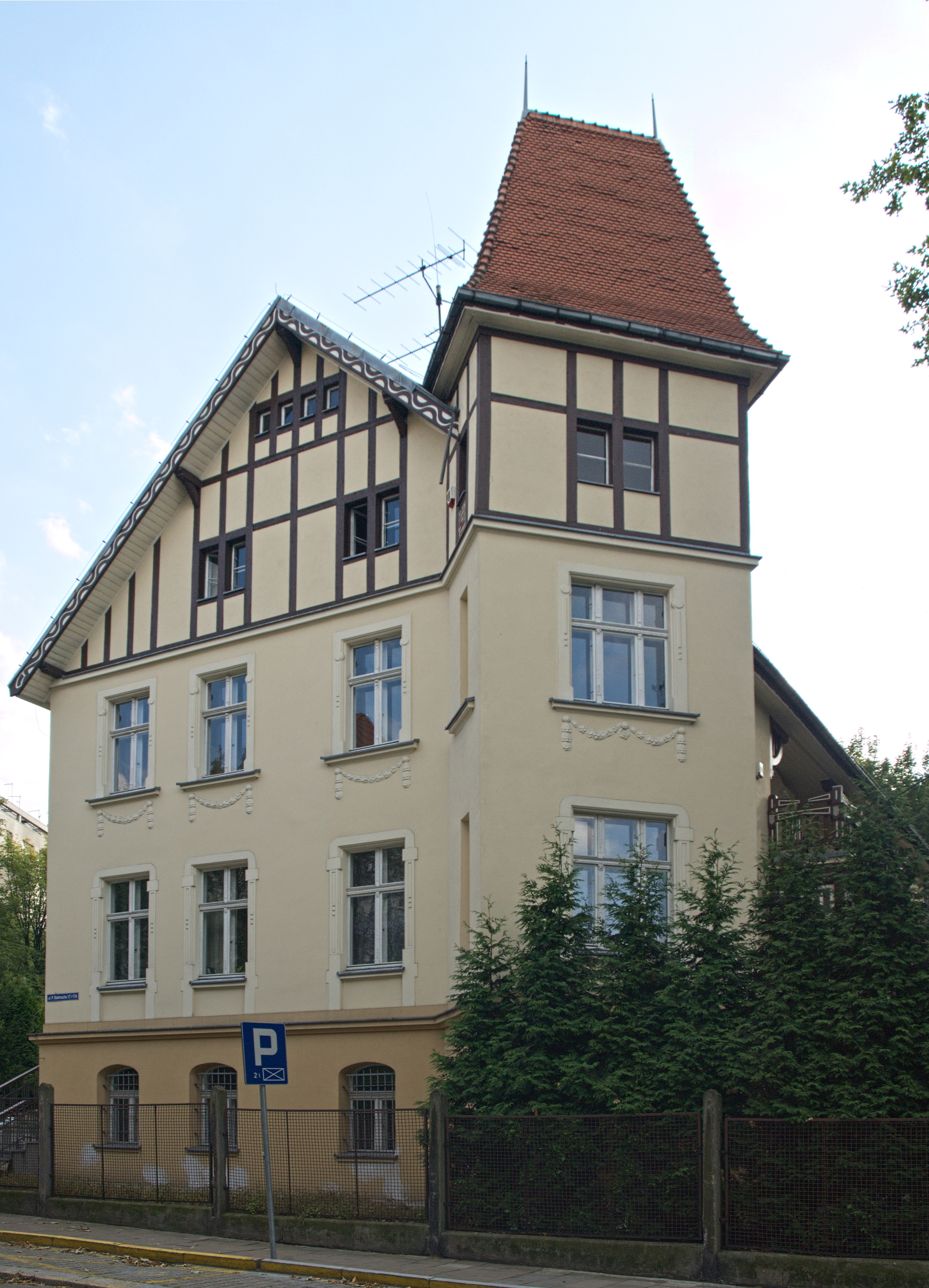
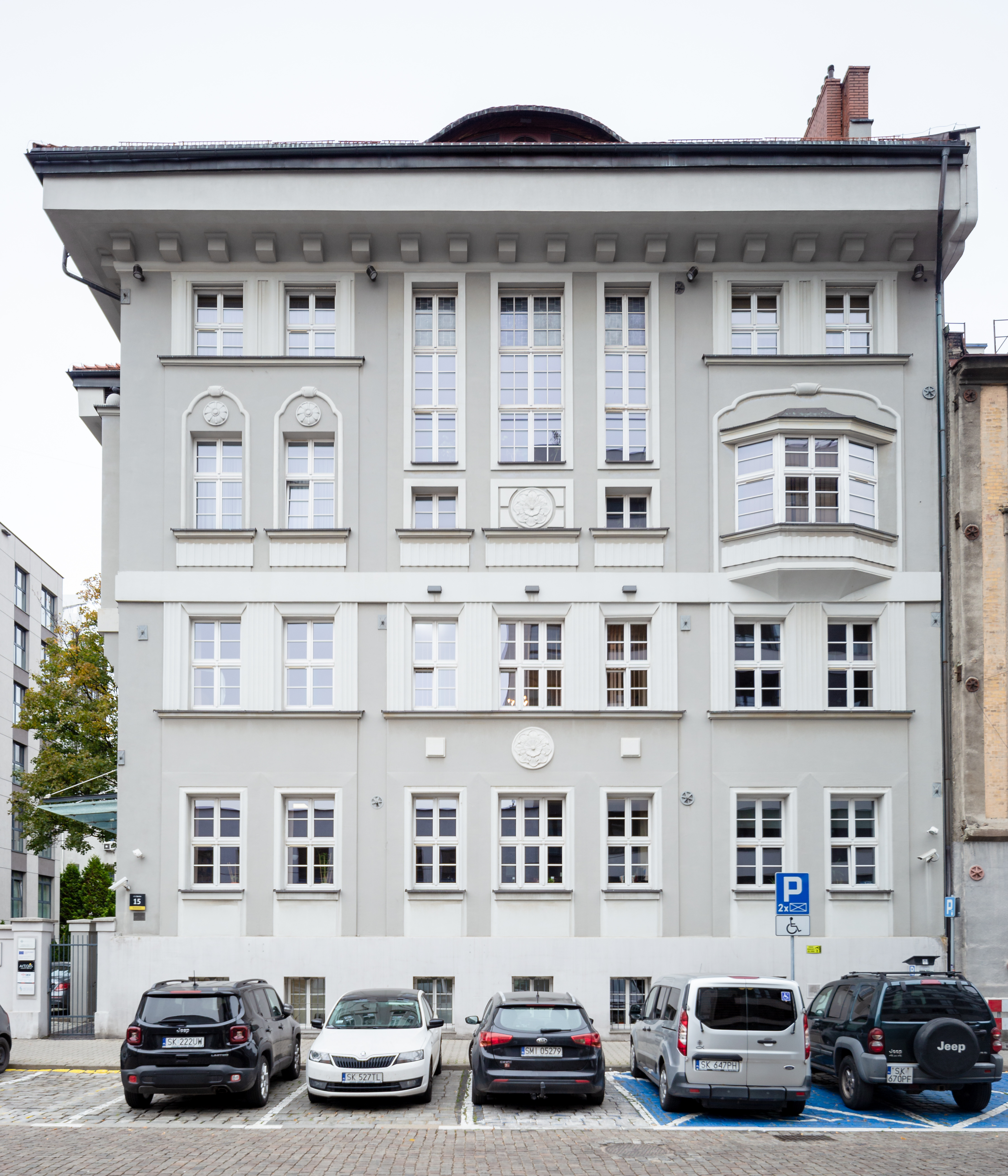
Honorary consulates of Peru and Slovenia

There are 15 honorary consulates in Katowice, of Austria, Belarus, Benin, Bulgaria, Chile, France, Georgia, Kazakhstan, Latvia, Lithuania, Luxembourg, Peru, Serbia, Slovenia and Ukraine.

=== Twin towns – sister cities ===
Katowice is twinned with:

- Cologne, Germany
- Groningen, Netherlands
- Košice, Slovakia
- Lviv, Ukraine
- Miskolc, Hungary
- Mobile, United States
- Opava, Czech Republic
- Ostrava, Czech Republic
- Pula, Croatia
- Saint-Étienne, France
- Shenyang, China
- Kaohsiung, Taiwan

== See also ==
- List of mayors of Katowice
- List of tallest buildings in Katowice
- Wojciech Korfanty Avenue
- Balkan railway
- Architecture of Katowice
