= Zawodzie, Katowice =

District of Katowice

Zawodzie
- Katowice District
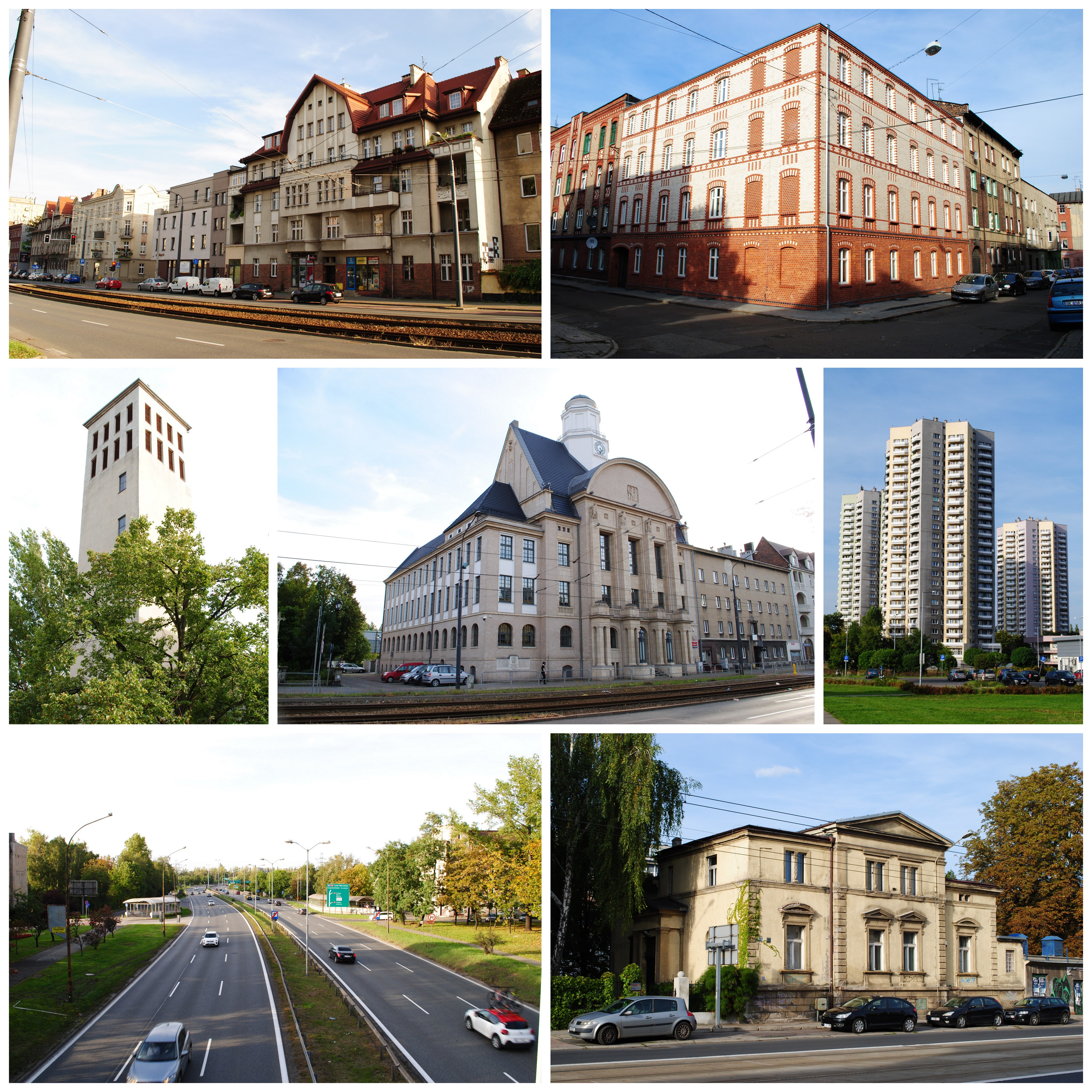
- Tenements on 1 Maja Street, tenements at the corner of Karol and S. Czarniecki streets, the Church of the Divine Providence, the University of Economics administration building, Osiedle Walentego Roździeńskiego, Murckowska Street, and the former villa at 11 1 Maja Street

- Location of Zawodzie within Katowice
- Coordinates: 50°15′30.513″N 19°02′41.667″E
- Country: Poland
- Voivodeship: Silesian
- County/City: Katowice
- Established: 1 January 1992

Area
  - Total: 4 km^{2} (1.5 sq mi)
- Elevation: 260–290 m (850–950 ft)

Population (2020)
  - Total: 10,835
  - Density: 2,700/km^{2} (7,000/sq mi)
- Time zone: UTC+1 (CET)
  - Summer (DST): UTC+2 (CEST)
- Area code: (+48) 032

Zawodzie (German: Zawodzie) is a part and a district of Katowice, located in the central-eastern section of the city, between Bogucice, Dąbrówka Mała, Janów-Nikiszowiec, Osiedle Paderewskiego-Muchowiec, and Śródmieście, along the Rawa river. The district is multifunctional, with a well-developed industrial sector (factories such as the Helios Light Bulb Factory and Porcelana Śląska once operated there), including a rich tradition of metallurgy (the Kunegunda Zinc Smelter and Ferrum SA). Due to the presence of the University of Economics in the district, it also has a well-developed higher education sector.

The history of Zawodzie dates back to the late 17th century. It was founded as a colony of Bogucice on the other side of the Rawa river – "beyond the water" (za wodą in Polish) – which is said to be the origin of the district's name. Initially an agricultural settlement, it transformed into an industrial center in the 19th century. The main thoroughfare of Zawodzie's development became the present-day 1 Maja Street, along which a number of tenements, industrial plants, and public buildings were constructed, including the Gmina Bogucice Town Hall and the Church of the Divine Providence. Zawodzie belonged to Gmina Bogucice, which was incorporated into Katowice in 1924. In the 1970s, Osiedle Walentego Roździeńskiego was built there, and a large portion of the district was redeveloped, resulting in the creation of a major transportation hub.

Several national roads run through Zawodzie: national road 79 (Walenty Roździeński Avenue and Bagienna Street) and national road 86 (Murckowska Street and Walenty Roździeński Avenue from the Bagienna interchange), as well as Warszawa Zachodnia–Katowice and Oświęcim–Katowice railways, along which the Katowice Zawodzie railway station is located. The district has an area of 4 km², and in 2020 had 10,835 inhabitants.

== Geography ==
=== Location ===
Zawodzie is one of the 22 districts of Katowice, serving as a sub-unit of Gmina No. 3 and located within the group of eastern districts. The district is situated in the central-eastern part of the city and borders Bogucice and Dąbrówka Mała to the north, Szopienice-Burowiec to the east, Janów-Nikiszowiec to the south, and Osiedle Paderewskiego-Muchowiec to the west. Its boundaries are:

- to the north – along Walenty Roździeński Avenue from the intersection with Jerzy Duda-Gracz Street to the exit between buildings nos. 188 and 190;
- to the east – through industrial and commercial areas. South of these, the boundary runs along the west side of the Gigablok Wastewater Treatment Plant and follows the Rawa riverbed eastward. Further on, before intersecting with Obrońców Westerplatte Street, the boundary runs south to Transportowców Street;
- to the south – the boundary runs between residential areas and the site of the former Amanda Colony, and further on surrounds the Katowice Central Municipal Cemetery from the east and south;
- to the west – the boundary runs north along Murckowska Street to the railroad tracks, then turns west, running parallel to them, and at Graniczna Street, it turns north, crosses Warszawska Street, and runs west from Jerzy Duda-Gracz Street to the tripoint with the boundaries of Bogucice and Śródmieście near the intersection with Walenty Roździeński Avenue.

The historical boundaries of Zawodzie run through the areas of two Katowice districts: Osiedle Paderewskiego-Muchowiec and Zawodzie. To the west, Zawodzie is historically bounded by Graniczna Street; to the north by the Rawa river; to the east, the boundary runs near the tram depot; and to the south, it runs through Osiedle Paderewskiego and the Valley of Three Ponds, crosses Murckowska Street, and continues behind the municipal cemetery and near the Amanda Colony. In terms of historical regions, the district is located in the eastern part of Upper Silesia.

According to Jerzy Kondracki's physio-geographical regionalization, Zawodzie is located in the Katowice Upland mesoregion, which forms the southern part of the Silesian Upland macroregion. The Silesian Upland itself is a part of the Silesian-Kraków Upland subprovince.

=== Geology ===
Zawodzie is located in the Upper Silesian Sinkhole in an area with horst structures. At the turn of the Devonian and Carboniferous periods, the Paleozoic bedrock of the Silesian Upland was disturbed by the formation of a sinkhole, which during the Carboniferous was filled with conglomerates, sandstones, and shales containing bituminous coal deposits. Formations from this period form the bedrock of the district, and a fault runs meridionally near Murckowska Street. Upper formations from the Carboniferous period cover a large part of the district, located south of the railroad tracks. Outcrops of the Orzesze layers (Westphalian B) are found there. They consist of massive sequences of mostly shale with intercalations of sandstone, siderite, and coal, and its thickness exceeds 900 m.

The main characteristics of the Zawodzie landscape were formed during the Tertiary period. At that time, intense chemical weathering and denudation were taking place. During the Quaternary, the area was likely covered by the Scandinavian ice sheet twice: during the oldest Mindel glaciation and during the Riss glaciation. The sediments from the first glaciation were mostly removed during the interglacial, while the Riss glaciation ice sheet left behind tills along valley depressions.

In Zawodzie, the area formed on till stretches along the valley of the Leśny Stream south of the railroad tracks, while the urbanized part of the district along 1 Maja Street near Drajok and along Bulwary Rawy is built on Pleistocene glacial and fluvioglacial sands and gravels. Additionally, the industrial and commercial areas on the border between Zawodzie and Bogucice are composed of sandy and silty eluvial till on layered sands.

During the current Holocene, Pleistocene sediment layers are being eroded and cleared away, while in river valleys a low terrace has formed in several stages. The valley of the Leśny Stream and the Rawa river in its immediate vicinity are composed of Holocene river sediments.

=== Terrain ===
Zawodzie is located in the Silesian Upland, on the Bytom-Katowice Plateau, which is part of the Katowice Upland mesoregion. The topography of the district is varied. The urbanized part of Zawodzie consists of river valley floors with Pleistocene terraces; the area along the southern section of Murckowska Street comprises flat clay uplands, while the remaining area, encompassing industrial and forested lands south of the railroad tracks, consists of hilly uplands.

The present-day topography of Zawodzie was mainly shaped by the Mindel glaciation and the maximum stage of the Riss glaciation, while in recent times, morphogenetic activity of humans related to settlement and mining has also had a significant impact. This has led to the destruction of the natural substrate and the creation of new forms of landform degradation. Almost the entire area of the district also forms an anthropogenic leveled surface.

In terms of morphological units, Zawodzie is located mainly in two areas. The urbanized part of the district is situated in the Rawa Depression. It is a valley form deeply incised into Carboniferous strata. The higher part of the terrace constitutes an erosional-denudational surface formed after the Riss glaciation. The Murcek Plateau, meanwhile, covers the southern part of the district, forming several distinct ridges as it extends toward the city center. Zawodzie's highest point is also located there, on the border between Zawodzie and Janów-Nikiszowiec, on the slope of Mrówcza Górka hill. Its elevation is approximately 290 m above sea level. The lowest point is a large area in the eastern part of the district, in the Rawa Depression, with an elevation of less than 260 m above sea level. The elevation difference between the highest and lowest points is approximately 30 meters.

=== Soils ===
The soils in Zawodzie have generally developed on a subsoil of sandy loam, while river valleys often contain an organic subsoil. Human activity has altered soil properties, and long-term urban development has led to the formation of anthrosols in the district. Some of the land is affected by mining operations and is also contaminated with heavy metals. The area along the Leśny Stream valley is covered with brown soils formed from tills and loamy and silty sands. Their properties are similar to those of brown soils, and their pH is mostly acidic or close to neutral. In the eastern part of the district, however, anthrosols formed from sandstones predominate. Human activity is the main soil-forming factor in these soils.

=== Surface and groundwater ===
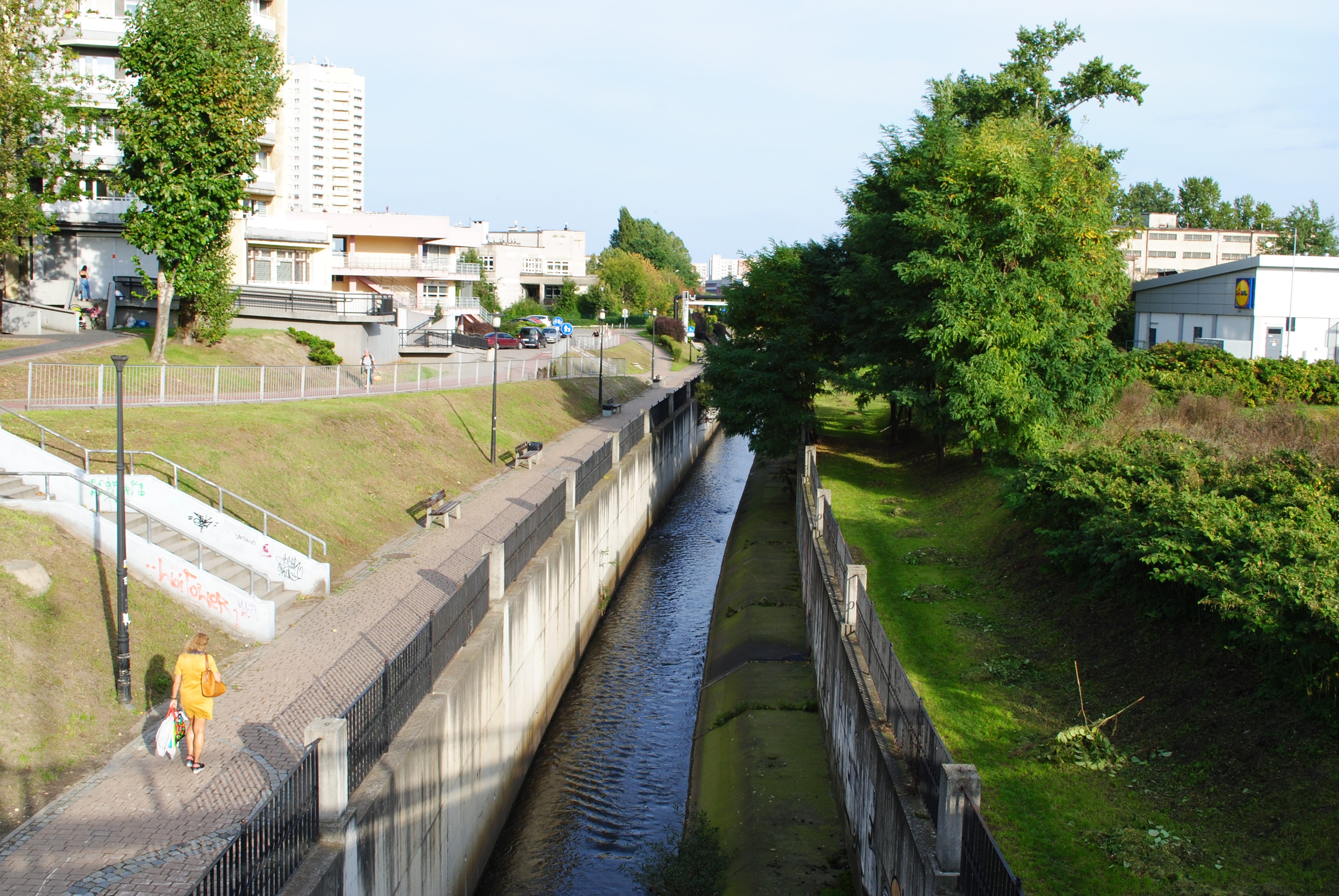
Rawa river at Jerzy Duda-Gracz Street; view toward the east

Zawodzie is located within the Vistula drainage basin, in the basin of two rivers: Leśny Stream and the Rawa. The Rawa basin covers the western, northern, and eastern parts of Zawodzie, while the Leśny Stream basin encompasses a section in the center of Zawodzie at its confluence with the Rawa and extends southward near Murckowska Street. A fifth-order drainage divide runs between the two basins.

The Leśny Stream is subject to ongoing regulation. In 2012, the water quality of the Leśny Stream at its confluence with the Rawa was assessed as poor, its physicochemical status was below good, its ecological potential and biological status were rated as moderate, and its status regarding the presence of particularly harmful substances was good at that time. The Rawa is an open drainage channel, fed mainly by rainwater as well as municipal and industrial wastewater. This river, a tributary of the Czarna Przemsza, flows from west to east within Zawodzie. Its entire course is regulated, and it is embanked. In 1913, as part of the regulation of the Rawa, the weir located near Zawodzie was removed.

Today, there are no bodies of water within Zawodzie, although the Kaszyca Pond was located on the site of the Zawodzie tram depot. It was visible on maps from 1916 and 1958. Between approximately 1916 and 1934, a pumping station was located there.

According to Bronisław Paczyński's classification, Zawodzie is located within the Silesian-Kraków hydrogeological region, in the Upper Silesian subregion. Aquifers are present in all strata, but their significance depends on several factors. According to Poland's division into Groundwater Bodies, the entire district lies within Groundwater Body No. 111 (Central Vistula Upland Subregion).

=== Climate ===
The climatic conditions in Zawodzie are similar to those of Katowice as a whole. They are modified by both climatic and local factors. The district's climate is influenced more by oceanic factors than by continental ones, and occasionally by tropical air masses reaching the area from the southwest through the Moravian Gate.

The average annual temperature for the 1961–2005 period at the nearby station in Muchowiec was 8.1°C. The warmest month during the study period was July (17.8°C), and the coldest was January (−2.2°C). The average annual sunshine duration from 1966 to 2005 was 1,474 hours, while the average cloud cover during the same period was 5.3. The average annual total precipitation for the period 1951–2005 was 713.8 mm. The average duration of snow cover is 60–70 days, and the growing season lasts an average of 200–220 days. Throughout the year, westerly and southwesterly winds predominate (20.7% and 20.4% of all winds, respectively), while winds from the north are the least frequent (5.7%). The average wind speed was 2.4 m/s.

The climate of Zawodzie is influenced by local factors (microclimate), which depend on land cover as well as on the area's location relative to river valleys. The microclimate of areas located directly along the Rawa river is the most unfavorable. Heat is frequently radiated there, and high humidity causes evaporation to increase significantly, which absorbs heat. In areas of dense development, the local climate is influenced by the heating of the atmosphere due to human activity. Compact areas of buildings, roads, and squares cause an increase in air temperature in the lower atmospheric layer. These areas also lose heat more quickly due to radiation at night, and the lack of moisture in the air does not promote prolonged heat retention.

=== Nature and environmental protection ===
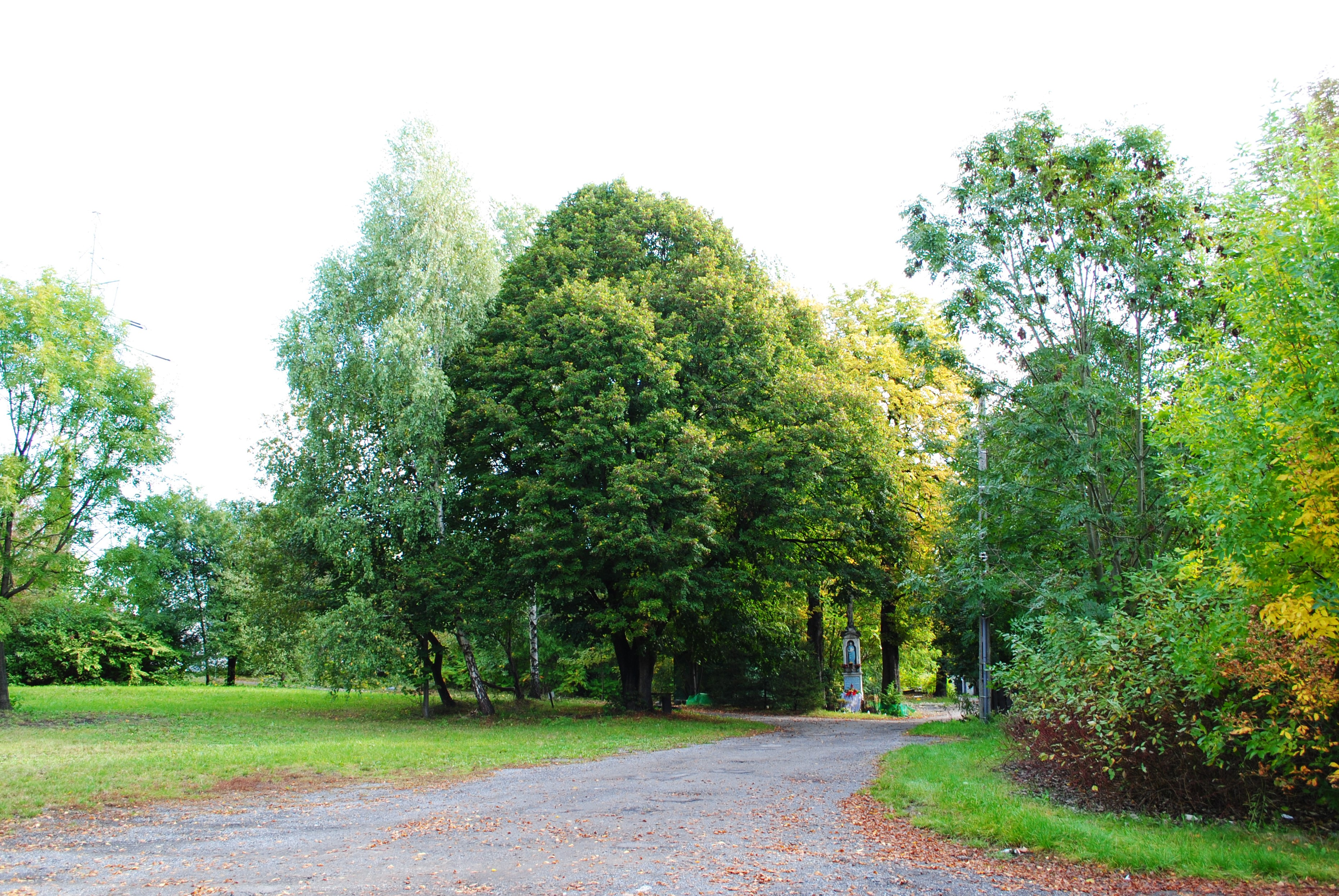
Green areas in Drajok

The natural vegetation in Zawodzie has been shaped since the last glaciation 12,000–16,000 years ago, and over the last 200 years it has been subjected to strong anthropogenic pressure. Originally, the lands along the Rawa valley were covered by riparian forests and alder carrs, while beech forests grew in higher-elevation areas, and between these, oak-hornbeam forests. The development of dense housing has led to the almost complete disappearance of natural elements. Ruderal species have developed in urbanized habitats, growing in Zawodzie mainly in industrial and post-industrial areas. Conditions were also created for the development of synanthropic animals, the most important of which are birds, including those that have long accompanied humans, such as the house sparrow and pigeon, as well as native birds that have adapted to urban conditions, including swifts, house martins, and barn swallows.

Today, green spaces in the form of street plantings, courtyard greenery, cemeteries, squares, and parks play a central role in Zawodzie's natural landscape. These areas form green islands of varying sizes, and contact between them is hindered by barriers in the form of dense development. The Rawa River, on the other hand, serves as a wildlife corridor. The area of green space designated for recreational use in the Zawodzie urban unit is 1.49 ha; there are no family allotment gardens or parks there, while the area of squares and green spaces is 1.49 ha. There are two squares in Zawodzie established by the Katowice City Council: Andrzej Fonfara Square (at the corner of 1 Maja and Murckowska streets) and the Independent Students' Union Square (at the corner of Bogucicka and B. Czech streets). A problem in Zawodzie related to green spaces is their insufficient size. There are few playgrounds, developed green areas, and outdoor fitness facilities there.

== Name ==
The name "Zawodzie" is associated with the presence of numerous bodies of water and wetlands in the area – in this case, the Rawa river, which flows through the district and was formerly known as the Roździanka. The name reflects the topography of the area – in this case, Zawodzie means a settlement "beyond the water" (za wodą) relative to the location of Bogucice. The name "Zawodzie" began to spread around 1700.

The German teacher Heinrich Adamy, however, mistakenly classified "Zawodzie" as a patronymic name derived from the name of the village's founder, Zawadzki, translating it as "Dorf des Zawadzki", meaning "Village of Zawadzki".

== History ==
=== Until World War II ===
Before Zawodzie was founded, there was a watermill in the area of the present-day district at the turn of the 14th and 15th centuries – it is known that around 1390, it stood on the Rawa river. It was called Olszowy, and the residents of the surrounding buildings were known as Olszówki. Among the privileges granted to the parson of the Bogucice parish was also the right to collect rent from the mill. In the mid-17th century, a second facility of this type was opened at the site of today's S. Żółkiewski Street. Zawodzie was founded as a colony of Bogucice on the right bank of the Rawa, most likely at the end of the 17th century near the Olszowy mill. The first mention of Zawodzie dates back to 1700.

Originally, it was an agricultural settlement, expanding parallel to the course of the river, along which mills and other structures were located. In the early 18th century, the name "Zawodzie" was used interchangeably with the name "Karbowa". According to data from the Carolinian Cadastre from between 1723 and 1725, there were no houses there at the time, only fields. In the 17th century, the lands of present-day Zawodzie were incorporated into the estates of the Mieroszewski family of Mysłowice, and the privilege of the Bogucice parson to collect tolls was abolished. At that time, a second mill was also built on one of the flooded meadows. In 1783, the first public school in Zawodzie was opened in the Weissenberg's inn in the area of present-day 1 Maja Street.

In the early 19th century, a road was built along the present-day 1 Maja Street. It replaced the old, winding country road located several dozen meters to the south of it. The route originally connected Katowice with Mysłowice via Wilhelmina. Until 1816, Zawodzie was a hamlet of Bogucice, and after that time it became part of Gmina Bogucice. Maps from 1827 show sparsely developed areas of Zawodzie along the current 1 Maja Street, which at that time was concentrated at the intersection with today's Murckowska Street.

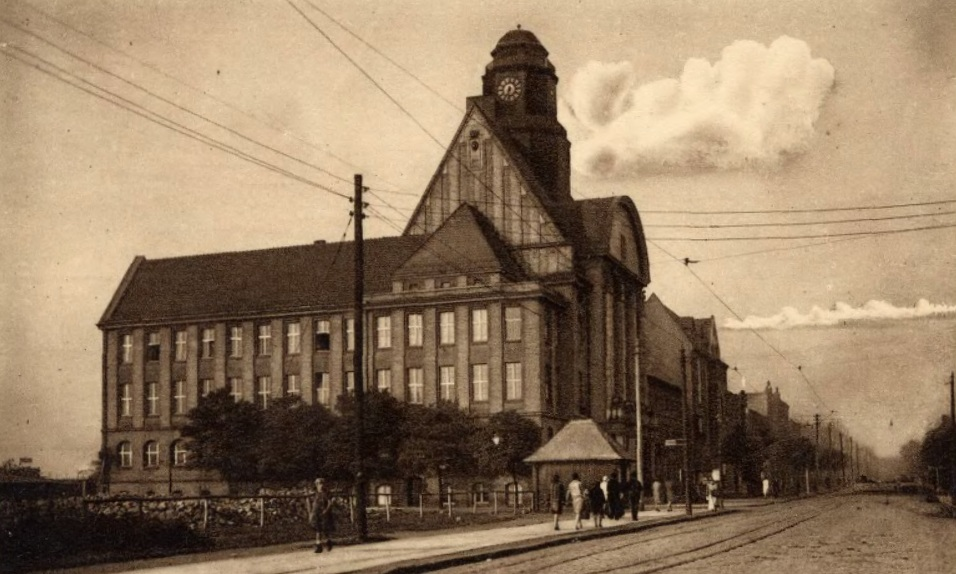
Former Gmina Bogucice Town Hall, dating from 1912; postcard from around 1930

In the mid-19th century, industrial activity began to develop in Zawodzie. On 3 October 1846, the railroad reached Zawodzie. At that time, the railway connecting Katowice and Mysłowice was completed, built by the Upper Silesian Railway Company. The present-day Katowice Zawodzie railway station was established on this railway in 1861. The first major industrial plant in the district was the Kunegunda Zinc Smelter, which began operations in 1840. In 1871, a factory producing steam boilers and other iron products – later known as Elewator – began production, and between 1873 and 1874, iron foundries were established, which gave rise to the later Ferrum SA.

In the 1860s, a road was laid out along today's Murckowska Street; around 1901, it was named Emanuelssegenstrasse, and it acquired its current name around 1920. According to Lech Szaraniec, at the end of the 19th century, Zawodzie was an independent gmina, and at the beginning of the 20th century, it formed a joint gmina with Bogucice. At the turn of the 19th and 20th centuries, Zawodzie underwent rapid architectural and urban development, with 1 Maja Street becoming the center of this growth, where a number of houses were built, including some with Art Nouveau façades. Next to the present-day Katowice Zawodzie railway station, on P. Chromik Street, stood the oldest hotel in Zawodzie – the Station Hotel (German: Bahnhof Hotel). The first mentions of it date back to 1899. On 7 August 1899, a tram line connecting Katowice with Mysłowice via Zawodzie was opened. In 1912, the Gmina Bogucice Town Hall was built at 50 1 Maja Street.

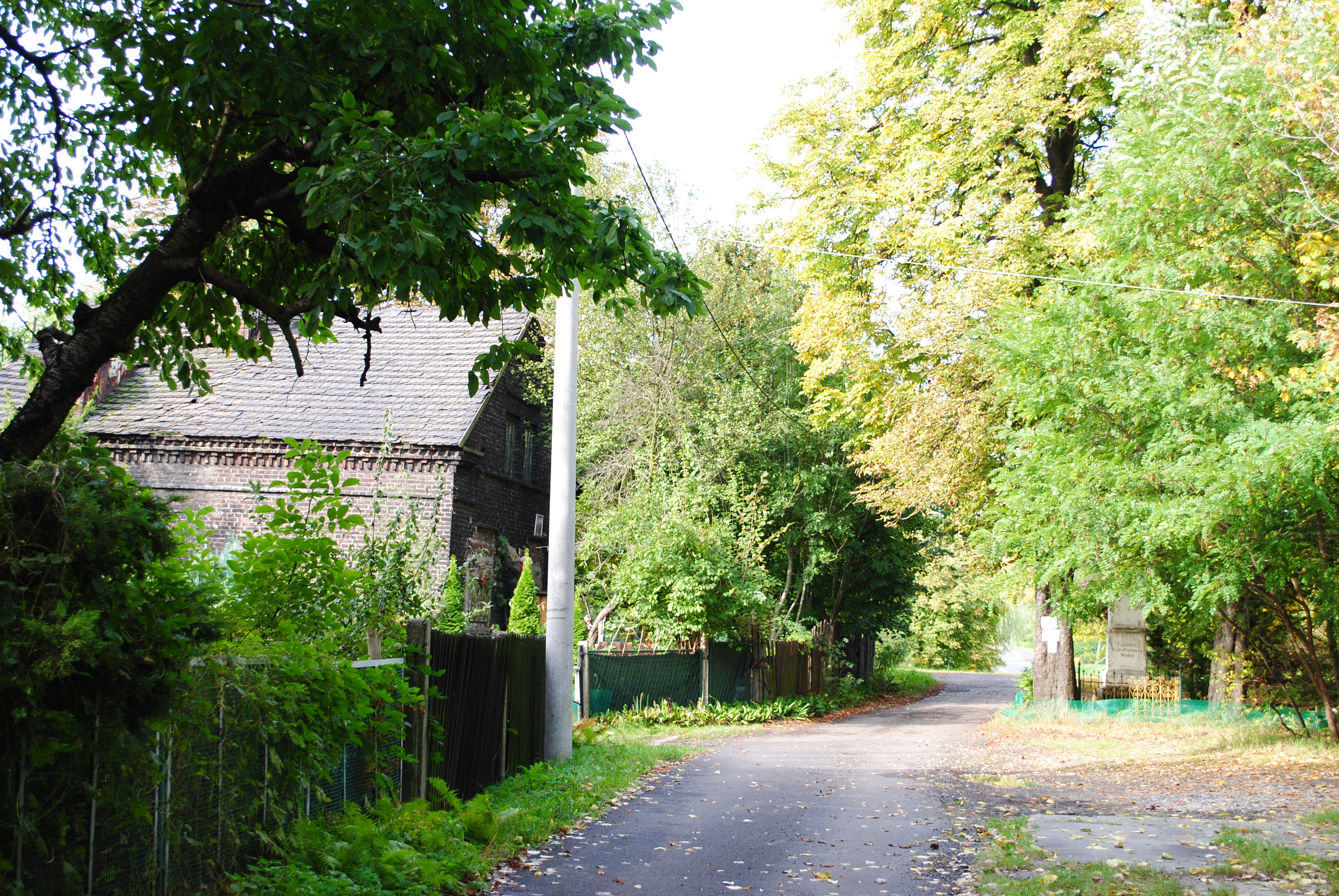
Part of Drajok, one of the settlements within the boundaries of Zawodzie, whose buildings date back to the 19th century

The following settlements and colonies were also established in Zawodzie: the Christmas Colony and Drajok. The Christmas Colony was located on the border between present-day Zawodzie and Osiedle Paderewskiego-Muchowiec, in the area of Równoległa and I. J. Paderewski streets, while Drajok was located near Burowiecka Street. The current buildings there date back to the 19th century.

During the Silesian Uprisings, the residents of Zawodzie actively participated in the insurgent activities. During the First Silesian Uprising, Zawodzie was captured by a unit led by Tomasz Kotlorz from Bogucice on 17–18 August 1919. The district came under fire from Grenzschutz units from the direction of the Valley of Three Ponds, which prevented the insurgents from organizing an attack on Katowice. The brothers Alojzy and Walenty Staw, who were shot by German militias in 1919, died while aiding the insurgents. On 3 May 1920, a ceremonial Constitution Day was celebrated with ceremonies at the sports field in Zawodzie and in Katowice's Market Square, drawing a crowd of approximately 72,000 people. That same year, the Second Silesian Uprising broke out. Fighting in Zawodzie took place on 19 August of that year. On that same day, Zawodzie was captured by the insurgents and remained in their hands until the end of the uprising. During the Upper Silesia plebiscite held in March 1921, the majority of residents of Gmina Bogucice-Zawodzie voted in favor of joining Poland. During the Third Silesian Uprising, Zawodzie was captured without resistance on the night of 2–3 May 1921 by insurgents led by Rudolf Niemczyk, a native of Zawodzie. Franciszek Kuś and Rudolf Lanuszny were also killed on the battlefield. Among the most active insurgents from Zawodzie were Maksymilian Nędza and Paweł Wybierski. On 22 June 1922, Polish troops marched through Zawodzie, led by General Stanisław Szeptycki, who, along with his unit, was heading to Katowice for the ceremonies marking the annexation of part of Upper Silesia to Poland.

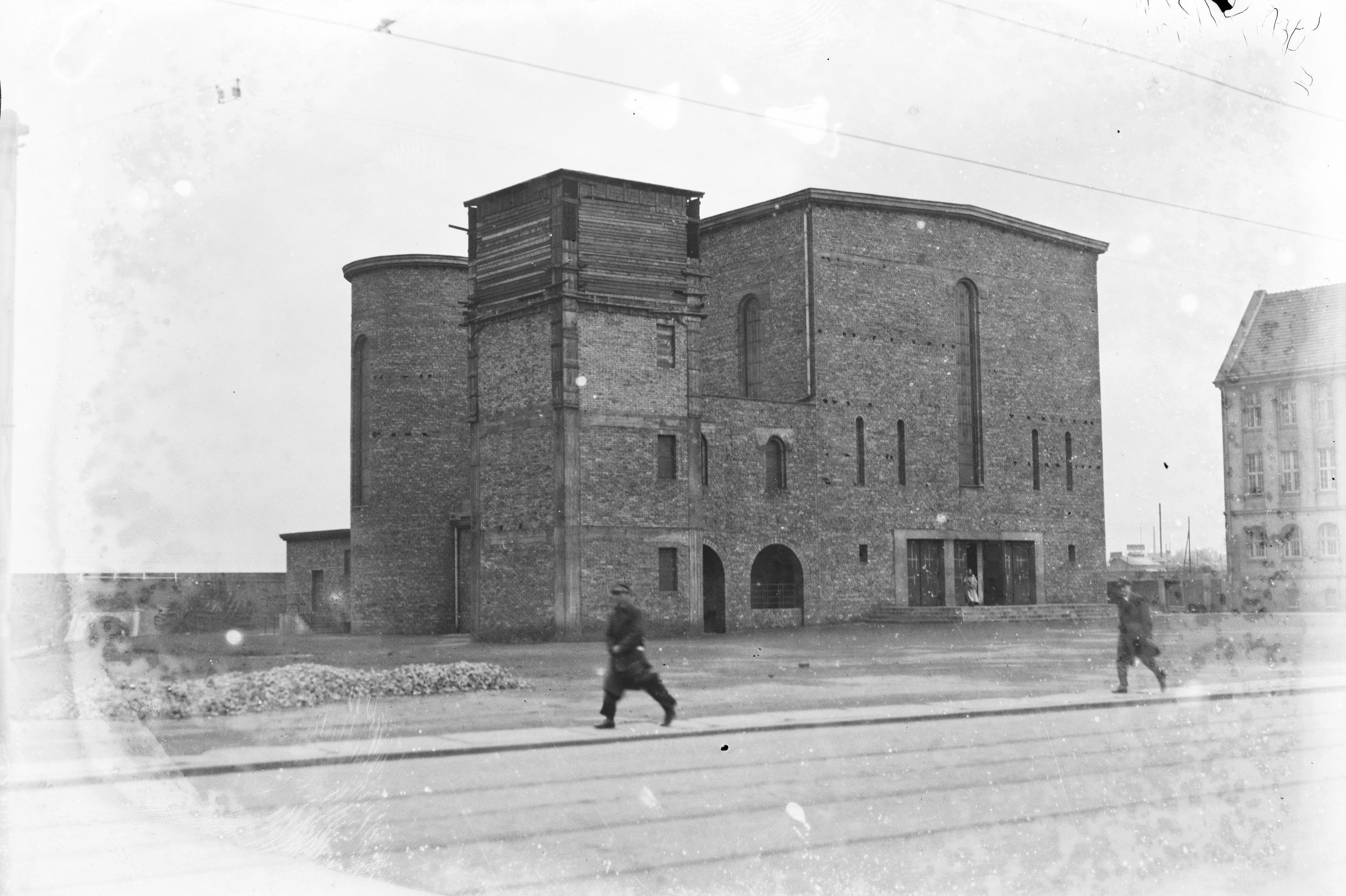
Construction of the Church of the Divine Providence in a photograph from April 1934

The interwar years in Zawodzie were a time of development for a number of sports, cultural, and social organizations, including women's associations such as the Polish Women's Society, the National Women's Organization, and the Catholic Women's Association; veterans' organisations such as the Youth Insurgents' Division and the Union of Silesian Insurgents; and others such as the Polish Youth Association.

A number of companies in various industries were also established during the interwar period. In 1921 (or 1920), the Giesche Porcelain Factory (later Bogucice) was founded; in 1927, the Katomasz Mining Machinery Factory (from 1938 known as Montana) was established; and in 1931 (or 1933), the Helios Light Bulb Factory was created. During the Great Depression in 1932, there were 86 bootleg mines operating in Zawodzie, where coal was mined illegally.

In 1924, Zawodzie, along with the entire Gmina Bogucice-Zawodzie, was incorporated into Katowice, becoming one of its districts. On 1 January 1927, a parish station was separated from the Bogucice parish in Zawodzie, which was elevated to the status of a parish on 20 December 1957. On 17 June 1931, a demonstration of approximately 150–180 unemployed people took place in the area of present-day Bohaterów Monte Cassino and 1 Maja streets. Clashes with the mounted police ensued, and as a result of the intervention, Emil Dawid was killed and three people were injured.

=== World War II and the postwar period ===
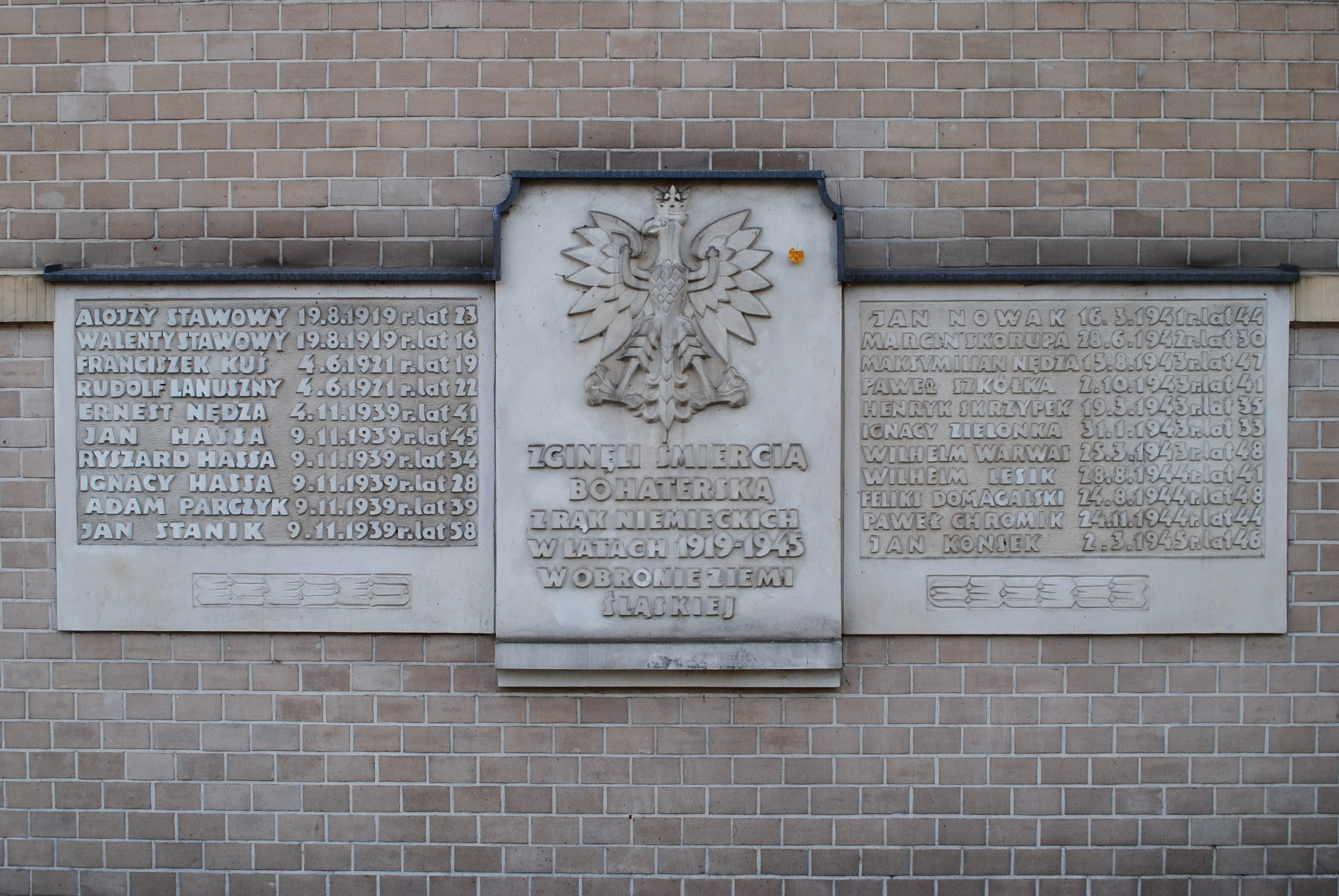
Plaque commemorating those who died in 1919 and 1945 "in the fight to defend Silesia", located on the building at 50 1 Maja Street

During World War II and the German occupation of Zawodzie at that time, many residents of the district were imprisoned and held in concentration camps, including Paweł Chromik, who served as deputy head of the Bureau of Information and Propaganda in the Katowice Inspectorate of the Home Army. He was executed by guillotine in 1944 at the Katowice prison. Labor camps were established at industrial facilities in Zawodzie, three of which were on the grounds of the Ferrum steelworks. On 26–27 January 1945, heavy fighting took place in Zawodzie between the German army and Soviet forces. During these operations, the building of the former town hall was damaged after being hit by an artillery shell.

During the Polish People's Republic, the headquarters of several Katowice-based universities were located in Zawodzie, including the Academy of Economics (later the University of Economics), and in 1949, a building for the primary and high school of the Society of Friends of Children was opened, which today houses the I. J. Paderewski X High School. In the 1950s, a road was built connecting the center of Katowice with the Dąbrowa Basin, bypassing the developments of Bogucice, Dąbrówka Mała, and Zawodzie – the present-day Walenty Roździeński Avenue. Originally, the road was single-lane; in the 1970s, it was modernized with new interchanges and overpasses, and the avenue itself was widened. In 1962, a tram depot on 1 Maja Street was opened.

In the historic area of Zawodzie, within the boundaries of the present-day district of Osiedle Paderewskiego-Muchowiec, Osiedle Paderewskiego was constructed in the 1970s. The decision to build it was made in 1965, and the first cooperative buildings were completed in 1974. In the early 1970s, construction began on a second housing estate in Zawodzie – Osiedle Walentego Roździeńskiego – on the marshy and waterlogged land along the Rawa river.

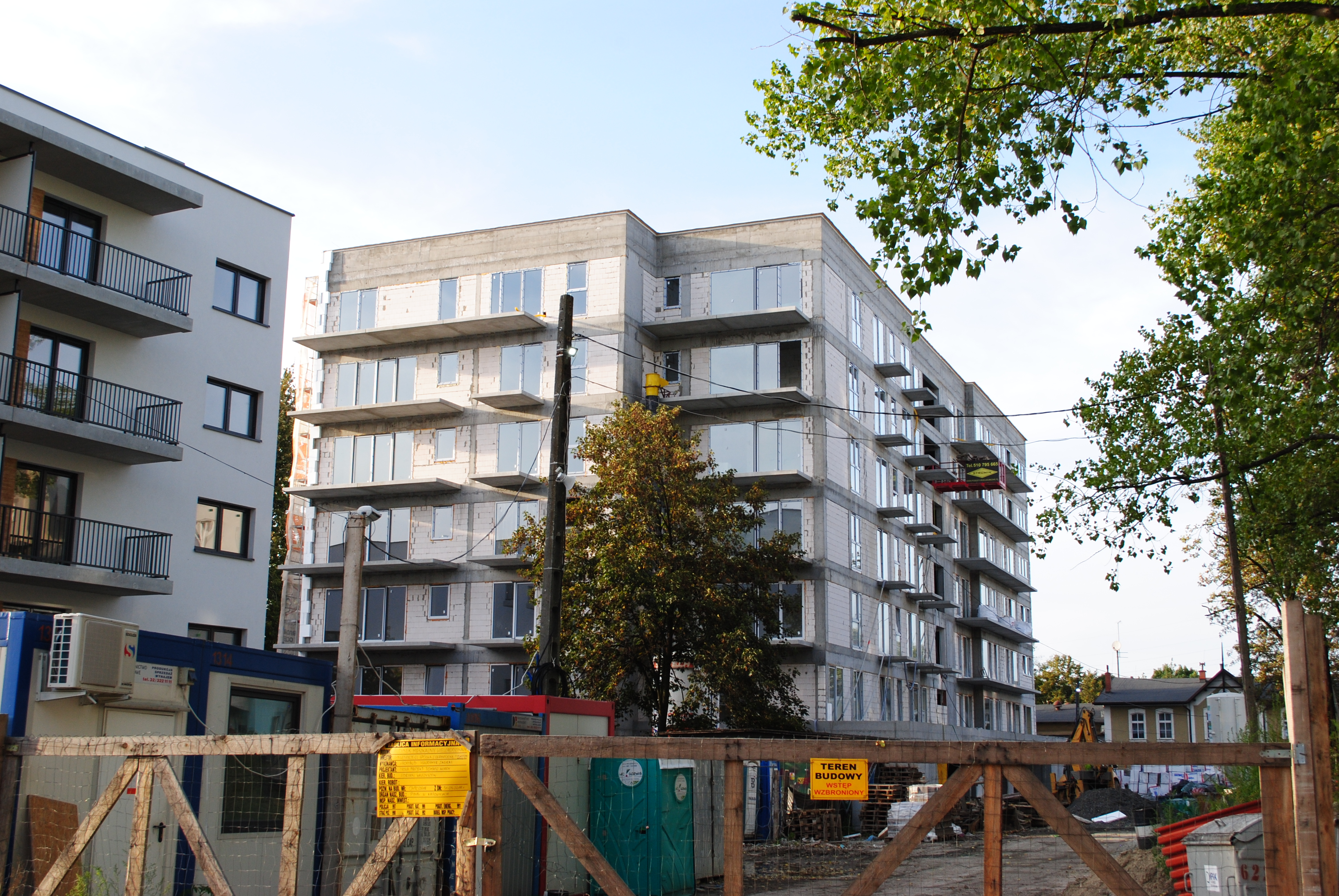
Building on Szeroka Street (part of the Bulwary Rawy housing estate) under construction in October 2020

In 1975, work began on the redevelopment of Zawodzie in the area of 1 Maja, Murckowska, Bohaterów Monte Cassino, Łączna, and P. Chromik streets. A year later, some of the houses on 1 Maja Street near Murckowska Street were demolished, and in 1978, those on Bohaterów Monte Cassino Street. In the 1970s, in connection with the reconstruction of the road network, the buildings of Drajok were also partially demolished, and the size of the entire settlement was reduced. In the 1980s, the first hotel in Zawodzie, the Senator, opened at 3 1 Maja Street. During the same period, in 1984, the Katowice Central Municipal Cemetery was opened at the foot of Mrówcza Górka hill near Gospodarcza Street.

On 16 September 1991, the Katowice City Council adopted a resolution under which, on 1 January 1992, Katowice was divided into 22 local government units and 22 areas of operation. At that time, Local Government Unit No. 3 Zawodzie was also established. At the turn of the 20th and 21st centuries, a housing estate developed by the Social Housing Association, known as Bulwary Rawy, was built between Bohaterów Monte Cassino and K. Marcinkowski streets. The first residential buildings in the estate were completed in 2001. Between 2007 and 2009, the tram tracks along 1 Maja Street were modernized, while the street itself, on the section between Jerzy Duda-Gracz Street and the future transit hub, was rebuilt between 2013 and 2015.

== Demography ==
Population structure in Zawodzie by gender and age (as of 31 December 2015)
| Period/Number of inhabitants | Pre-working age (0–18 years) | Working age (18–60/65 years) | Post-working age (over 60/65 years) | Total |
|---|---|---|---|---|
| Total | 1,809 | 7,438 | 2,793 | 12,040 |
| Women | 884 | 3,563 | 1,882 | 6,329 |
| Men | 925 | 3,875 | 911 | 5,711 |
| Femininity ratio | 96 | 92 | 207 | 111 |

In 1988, the area of present-day Zawodzie had a population of 15,661. At that time, the largest age groups were those aged 30–44 and those under 14. The smallest group was people over the age of 60.

In December 2007, 13,406 people lived in Zawodzie, which at the time accounted for 4.2% of Katowice's population. The district's population density at that time was 3,318 people per km². At that time, the largest age groups were those aged 40–59 and 15–29, while the smallest group consisted of people aged 14 and under. The part of the district located east of Murckowska Street was then home to approximately 7,700 people.

On 31 December 2013, 783 residents of Zawodzie were aged 75 or older.

At the end of 2014, 12,297 people lived in Zawodzie, and the population density at that time was 3,074 people per km². In terms of economic population groups, 1,859 people of pre-working age (15% of residents) lived in the district, 7,732 people of working age (63%), and 2,706 people of post-working age (22% of the total). In terms of gender, at the end of 2014, 5,836 men and 6,461 women lived in Zawodzie, while the femininity ratio during this period reached 111.

Sources: 1885 (according to another source, in December 1885 Zawodzie had 2,888 residents); 1900; 1988; 1997; 2005; 2010; 2015; 2020.

According to a survey conducted in 2011, 39.3% of the residents of Zawodzie identified as Polish, 24.6% as Silesian, and 36.1% as both Silesian and Polish.

In a demographic projection for 2030 prepared in 2007, the population of the Zawodzie urban area in 2020 was estimated at 7,112 people (95.4% of the 2007 figure) in the pessimistic scenario, and in the optimistic scenario at 7,212 people (96.7% of the 2007 population), while for 2030, the figures were 6,409 (86.0%) and 6,619 (88.8%), respectively. For the urban unit of Osiedle Paderewskiego-Roździeńskiego, the population decline for 2020 was estimated at 14,960 people in the pessimistic scenario and 15,157 people in the optimistic scenario, and for 2030 at 13,037 and 13,441 people, respectively.

== Politics and administration ==
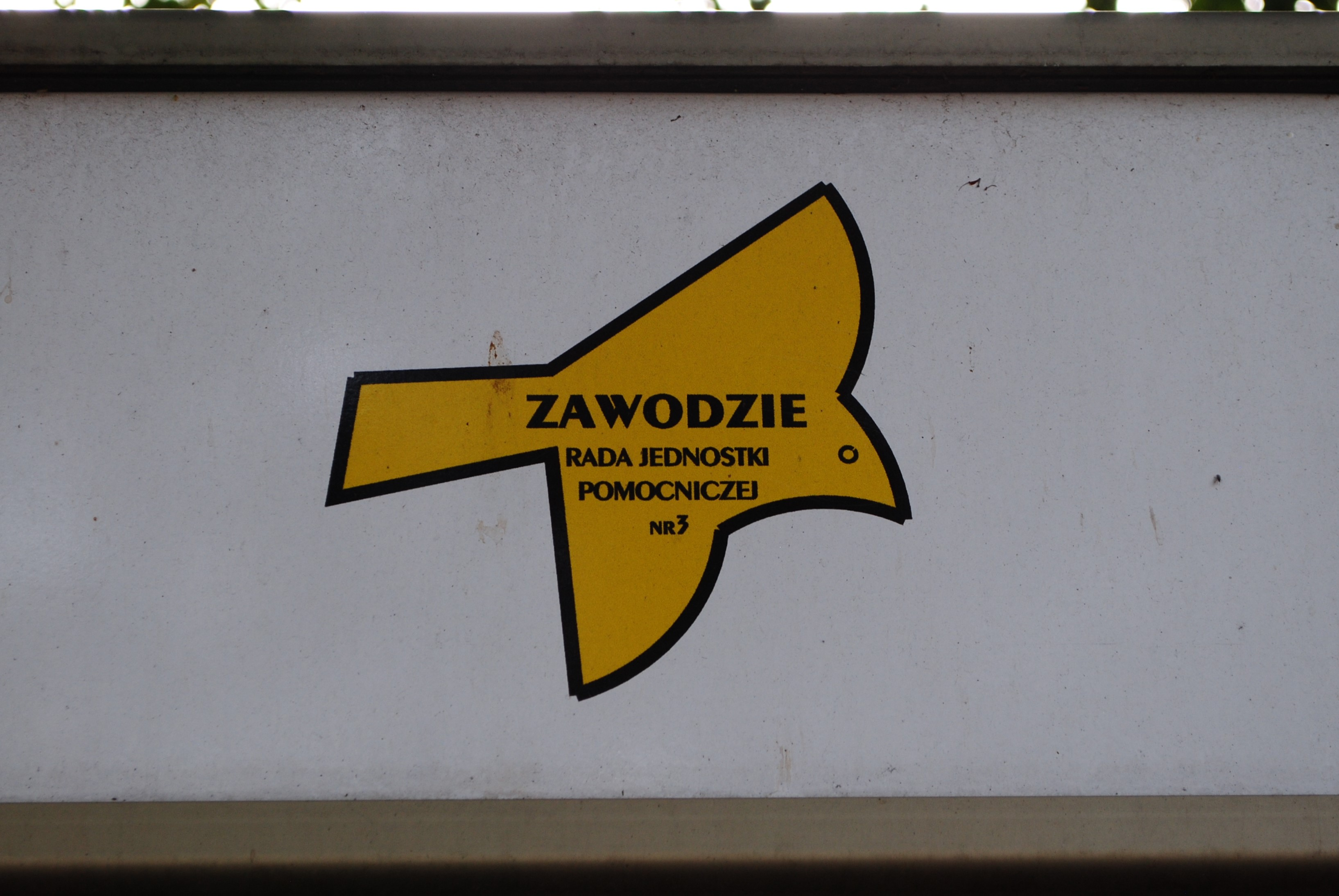
Logo of the former Zawodzie Auxiliary Unit Council No. 3, displayed on a plaque (2020)

District No. 3 Zawodzie is currently one of the 22 districts of Katowice, constituting a subsidiary unit of the gmina. It was established on 1 January 1992 by a resolution of the Katowice City Council as local government unit no. 3. According to Resolution No. XLVI/449/97 of the Katowice City Council of 29 September 1997, Zawodzie is a statutory district within the group of eastern districts.

The current district by-law was established by Resolution No. XLI/893/21 of the Katowice City Council of 25 November 2021. In accordance with the provisions of the by-law, the district's governing bodies are the District Council and the District Executive Board. The District Council consists of 15 members elected for a five-year term. It is the district's decision-making body, and its tasks include, among others, submitting requests to the authorities of the City of Katowice regarding proposals from district residents within the scope of its activities, initiating and organizing special events, cultural, sports, or recreational activities, providing opinions on local initiatives, and submitting proposals on city matters concerning Zawodzie. The District Executive Board is the district's executive body. The Chair of the Executive Board represents the district externally, and the board's responsibilities include, among other things, accepting requests from district residents, organizing and coordinating community initiatives, informing residents about district matters, and preparing draft resolutions for the District Council.

As of May 2022, neither the District Council nor the District Board were operational.

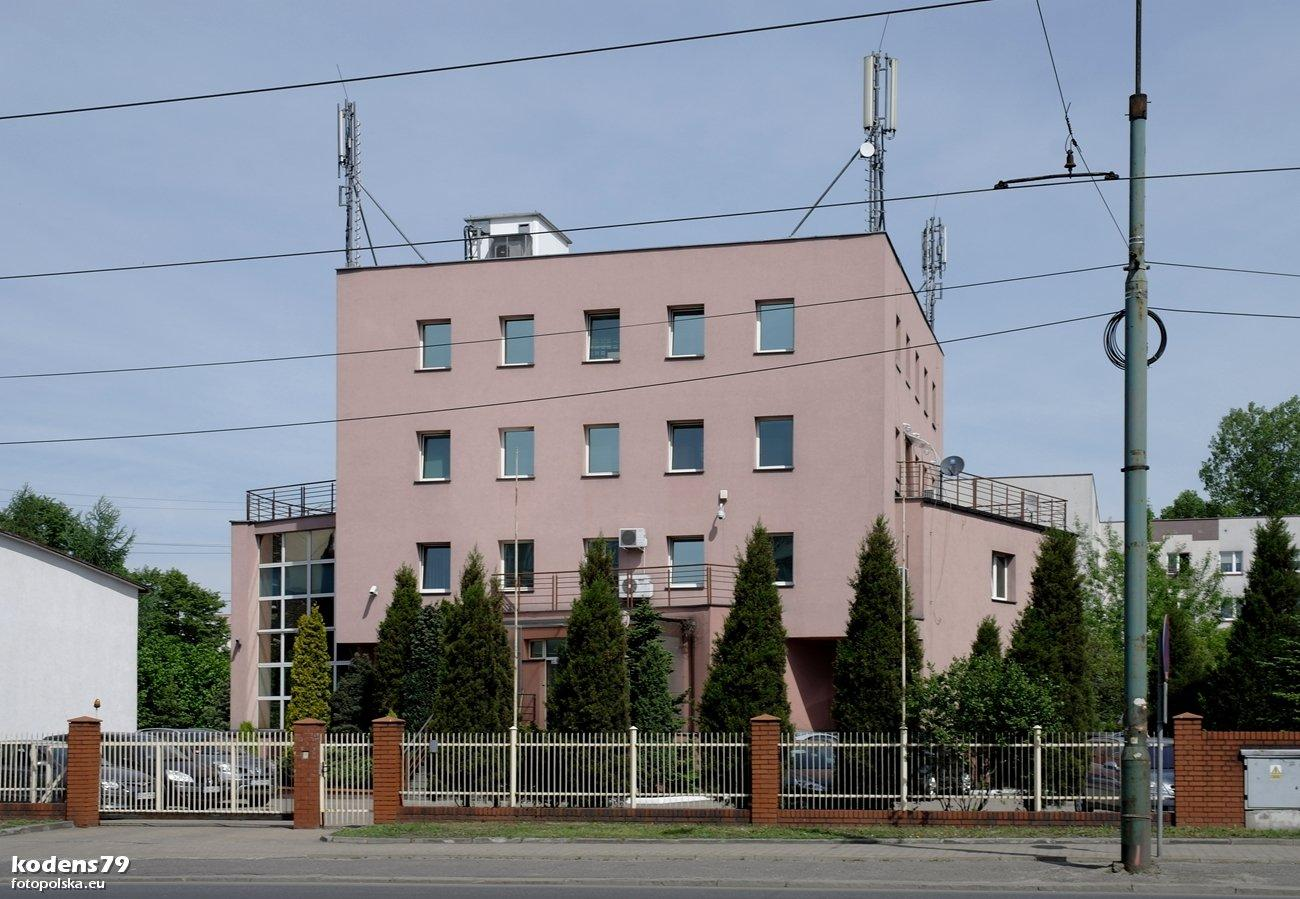
Headquarters of the Katowice branch of the Central Anticorruption Bureau (123 1 Maja Street)

As of May 2022, the only public administration office in Zawodzie is the Katowice branch of the Central Anticorruption Bureau, located at 123 1 Maja Street.

Historically, the area of Zawodzie underwent a series of administrative changes. After the Napoleonic Wars, Oppeln was established in the Kingdom of Prussia, and in 1818, the boundaries of certain counties were adjusted. At that time, the areas of present-day Zawodzie, among others, were incorporated into the Bytom County. Katowice became the capital of an independent county separated from the Bytom County, and its territory included, among others, Zawodzie.

At the end of the 19th century, Zawodzie was an independent gmina, and at the beginning of the 20th century, a joint gmina with Bogucice was established. Antoni Steuer points out, however, that Zawodzie was never a separate gmina in history, as this is not documented anywhere. On 1 May 1918, by resolution of the Gmina Council, the previous name of the Zawodzie district was abolished and it was renamed Bogutschütz-Süd, while Bogucice retained the name Bogutschütz-Nord. Two years later, on 10 March 1920, the new council renamed the gmina Bogutschütz-Zawodzie. In 1922, after the incorporation of parts of Upper Silesia into Poland, Zawodzie was located within Gmina Bogucice, situated in the Katowice County.

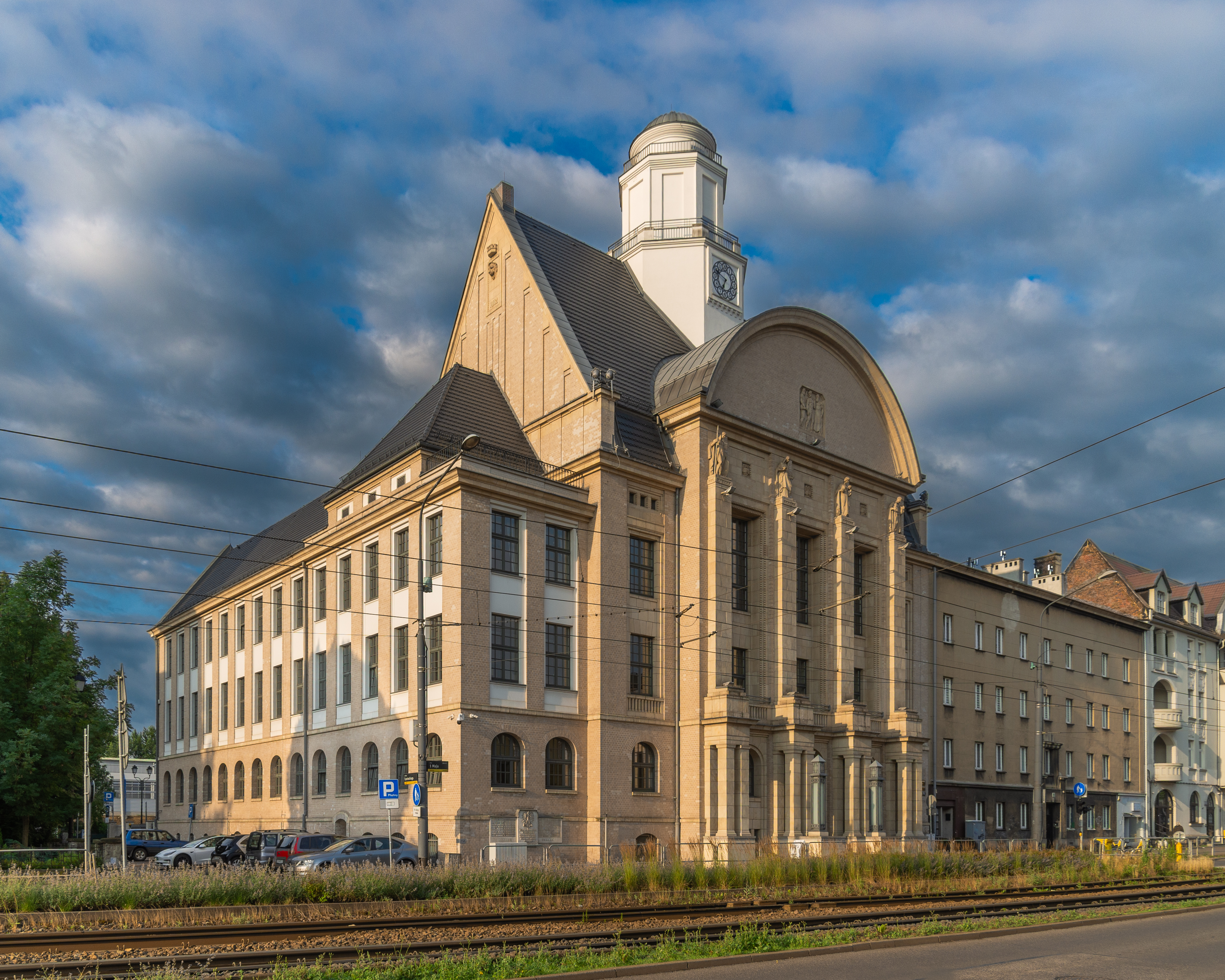
Historic building of the former town hall of Gmina Bogucice; currently the administration building of the University of Economics (50 1 Maja Street)

Pursuant to the Act of the Silesian Parliament of 15 July 1924, it was decided to incorporate into Katowice, among others, Gmina Bogucice, in which Zawodzie was located. This act entered into force on 15 October 1924. In 1925, in connection with the expansion of the city's boundaries and the increase in its population, the City Council divided Katowice into districts. The Bogucice-Zawodzie district was also established at that time.

In the 1930s, the Katowice City Council included council members elected from Zawodzie, such as Leopold Broda, a Sanation activist, Moritz Żmigród from the Jewish Circle, Jan Mutz, a representative of the German minority, and Bazyli Józefowicz from the Homeowners' Association. All of them lived on what was then Krakowska Street. Among the councilors' successes were the actions taken in 1932 against the threat of the closure of the Ferrum steelworks – under pressure from a group of councilors from Zawodzie, Mayor of Katowice, Adam Kocur, granted the plant a loan.

After the German occupation of Katowice in 1939, the new authorities restored the official place names that had been in use in 1922. On 3 February 1942, a new administrative division of the city was established by decree of the president of the Province of Upper Silesia. At that time, Zawodzie, along with Bogucice, was placed in the Kattowitz-Ost district. After Polish authorities took over the administration of Katowice in 1945, the legal status as of 1 September 1939 was restored. In 1954, present-day Katowice was divided into three districts, with the Zawodzie area forming part of the Bogucice-Zawodzie district. This division was abolished in 1973.

== Economy ==
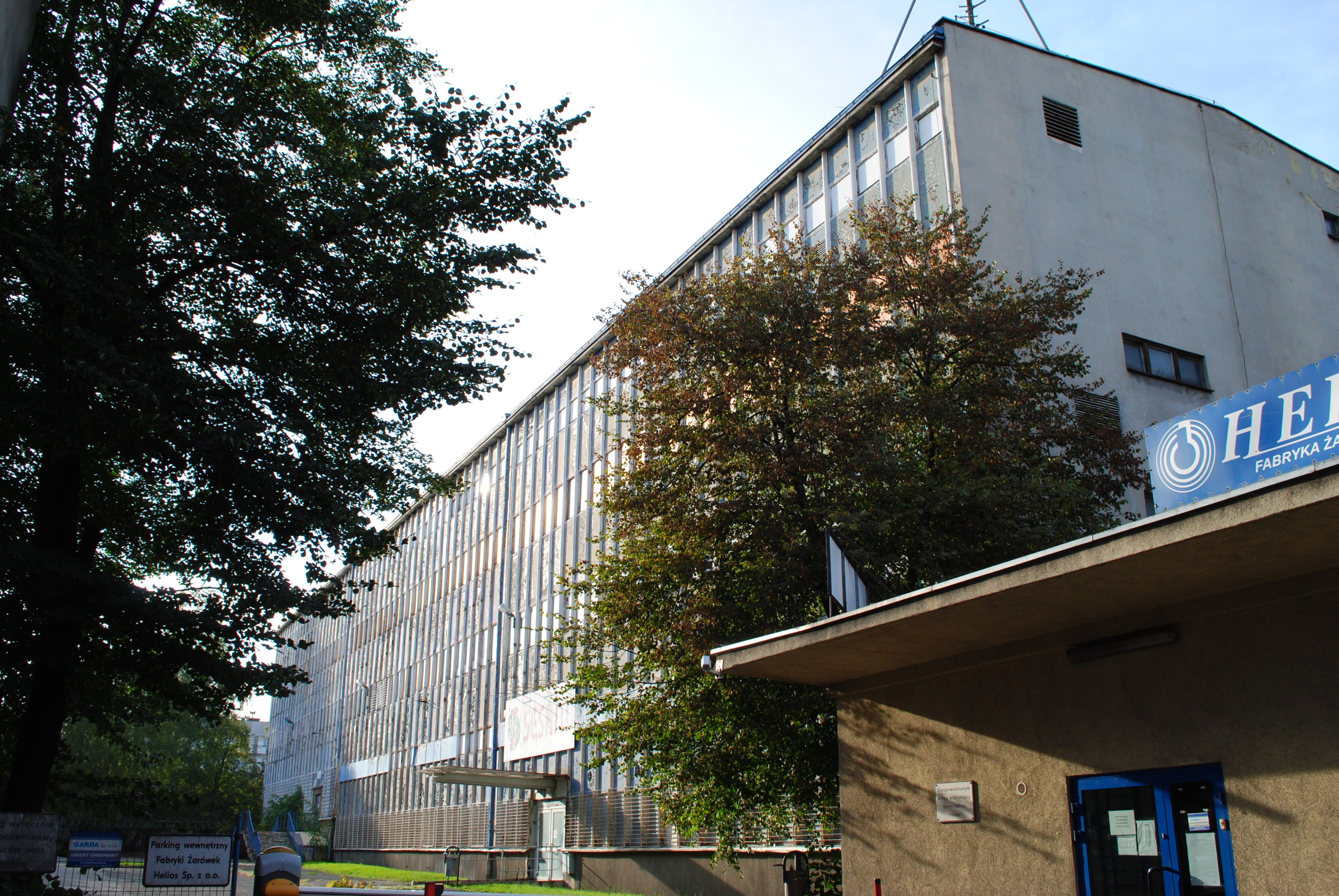
Helios factory complex, as seen from K. Marka Street

In economic terms, Zawodzie is a multifunctional district. It has large storage and logistics areas; services have developed in the central part of the district, while the southern areas consist of industrial zones with many plants and factories. Industry in Zawodzie developed south of the railway connecting Wrocław with Mysłowice via Katowice. Heavy industry also developed there, including zinc and iron smelting, as well as the chemical, machine, metal, ceramic, electrical engineering, construction, and wood industries. Industrial plants were also built along present-day 1 Maja Street, where numerous transportation-related facilities were established in the early 20th century, and metal and lighting industry plants during the interwar period.

As of 31 December 2013, there were 1,887 businesses registered in the REGON system operating in Zawodzie, which at the time accounted for 4.1% of all companies in Katowice. Of these, 1,750 were micro-enterprises. At that time, there were 465 registered unemployed residents of Zawodzie, which accounted for 3.71% of the district's population. Of these, 248 were women, and 52 were under the age of 25.

The local retail and service center in Zawodzie stretches along 1 Maja Street, from the intersection with S. Czarniecki Street to K. Marcinkowski Street. Retail and service establishments in this area generally line the main street and are located on the ground floors of buildings. Within Osiedle Walentego Roździeńskiego, they are arranged in a scattered pattern, usually integrated with green spaces.

Historically, Zawodzie was originally an agricultural settlement, and industry began to develop there in the mid-19th century. Forges operated along the Rawa river, and the first major industrial plant in Zawodzie was the Kunegunda Zinc Smelter, which began operations in 1840. It was located south of the railroad tracks. It was founded at the request of Wilhelm Schneider. In the 19th century, another zinc smelter – Augusta – was in operation; it began production in 1839. It changed owners several times and remained in business until 1870. On 11 September 1838, the Paulisens Glück Coal Mine, operating in Zawodzie, was granted a license. The first owner of the plant was Anton Klausa, and coal was mined there until 1873.

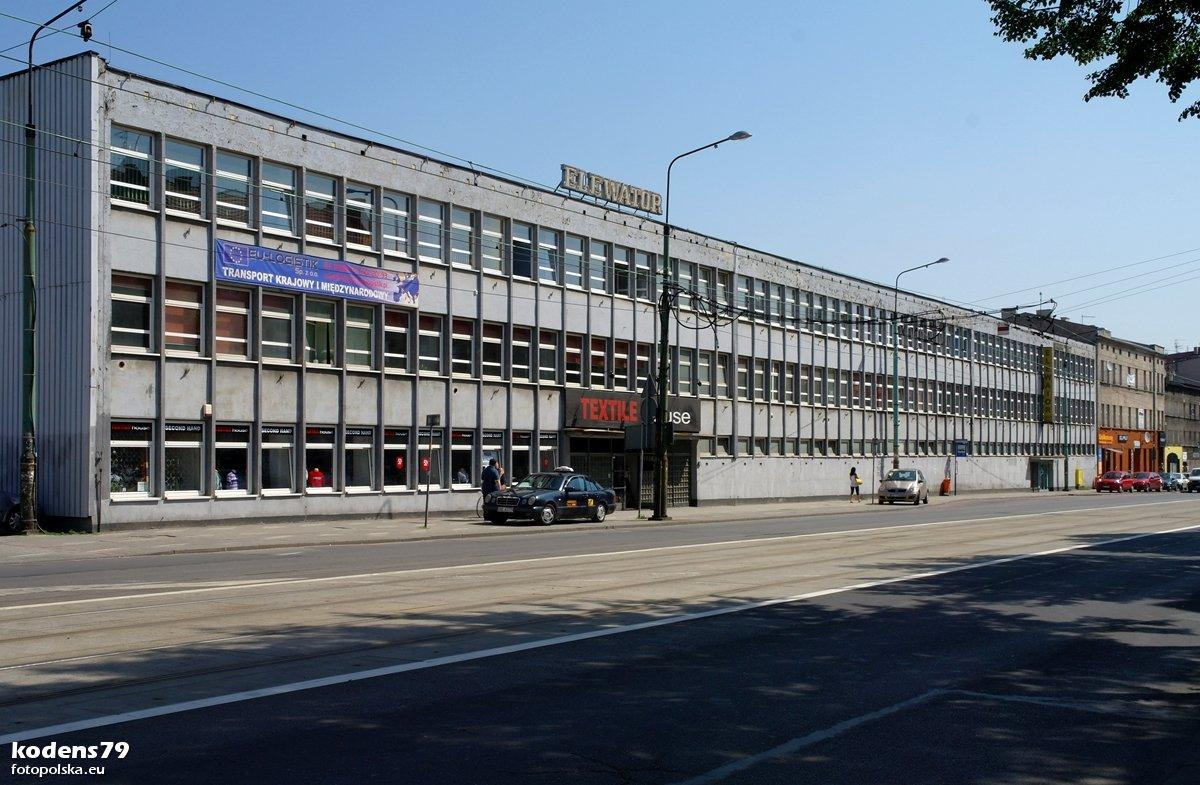
Now-demolished building of the Elewator plant (31 1 Maja Street)

In 1871, a factory producing steam boilers and other iron products (later known as Elewator) was established; an iron foundry was built between 1873 and 1874, and a superphosphate factory (later known as Montokwas) was opened in 1876. In 1889, the boiler factory was transformed into the Kania i Kuntze – Zawodzie iron machinery and equipment factory, where the joint-stock company Elewator was established in 1923. In 1991, the Elewator company was created, and its headquarters are currently in Ruda Śląska. In Zawodzie, the factory was located at 31 1 Maja Street – its buildings were demolished in 2013.

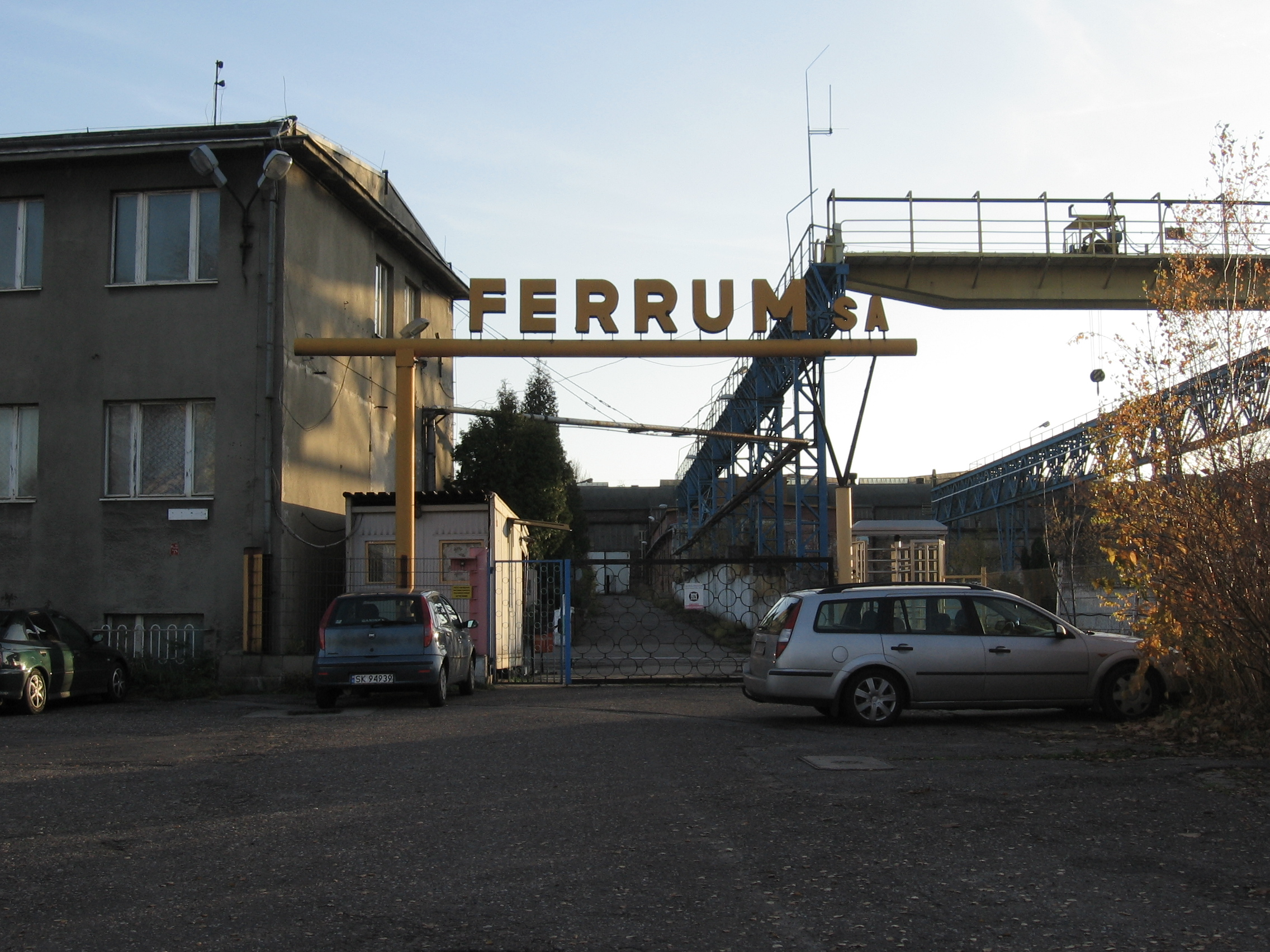
Entrance to Ferrum SA

In 1890, the Rhein & Co. iron foundry merged with the Jakub Steelworks (Jakobshütte; it was founded in 1856 in Katowice on present-day Stawowa Street), establishing the joint-stock company Ferrum-vormals Rhein & Co., which was transformed into Ferrum SA in 1919. At the end of the 19th century, the steelworks' annual output was estimated at approximately 0.5 million marks, and it produced, among other things, pipes, water equipment, and turnouts for railway stations. It also supplied equipment for hoist towers for coal mines. After 1890, the steelworks specialized in the production of steel pipes (including those for hydroelectric power plants), and its monthly production in 1912 amounted to approximately 1,000 tons.

Further industrial development took place during the interwar period. Among others, the following industrial plants were established at that time: the Giesche Porcelain Factory (1920 or 1921), the Katomasz Mining Machinery Factory (1917; operating under the name "Katomasz" from 1930), and the Helios Light Bulb Factory (1931 or 1933). Smaller companies were also operating at that time, located mainly on what was then Krakowska Street, some of which dated back to the 19th century. These were: the Albert Hermann Bodywork and Carriage Factory, the Pieckafel Tile Stove Factory, the Goldman & Co. Footwear Factory, the Upper Silesian Cable and Insulating Pipes Factory, the Elmes Mill, and the Higiena Sanitary Fittings and Central Heating Factory.

After 1922, the Kunegunda Zinc Smelter belonged to the Silesian Mines and Zinc Works joint-stock company. In 1938, with a workforce of 634 people, it produced 14,873 tons of raw zinc and sulfuric acid. Part of the capital of the Ferrum smelter was taken over by the Polish state after 1933. During the interwar period, it produced, among other things, water and sewer pipes, high-pressure pipes, castings for railcars and locomotives, as well as bolts and rivets; in the years leading up to the outbreak of World War II, the plant began manufacturing mining machinery. The company had representative offices in many parts of the world.

On 27 February 1924, the Almeco Company, the first factory in present-day Katowice to produce perfumes, essential oils, and makeup, was established in Zawodzie. It was located at today's 88 1 Maja Street. The factory ran into financial difficulties and was eventually shut down in 1935.

In 1945, the Kunegunda Zinc Smelter was taken over by the Zinc Industry Association, and five years later, it was incorporated into the Szopienice Zinc Works. The smelting furnaces of the former Kunegunda were shut down in 1963 and later dismantled. All that remains of the smelter is the water tower, visible from Murckowska Street. On 19 February 1945, operations resumed at the Helios plant, and in 1948, the factory established a partnership with Philips. By 1982, 326.6 million light bulbs had been exported from the factory. In 1958, the Katomasz Mining Machinery Factory was nationalized. The plant underwent modernization, and in 1983, it produced 29,534 mining carts and launched the production of protective mining nets. In 1952, the Ferrum steelworks was taken over by the Central Union of the Polish Metallurgical Industry. After 1989, the plant became an independent enterprise, and in the 1990s, the Huta Ferrum joint-stock company was established.

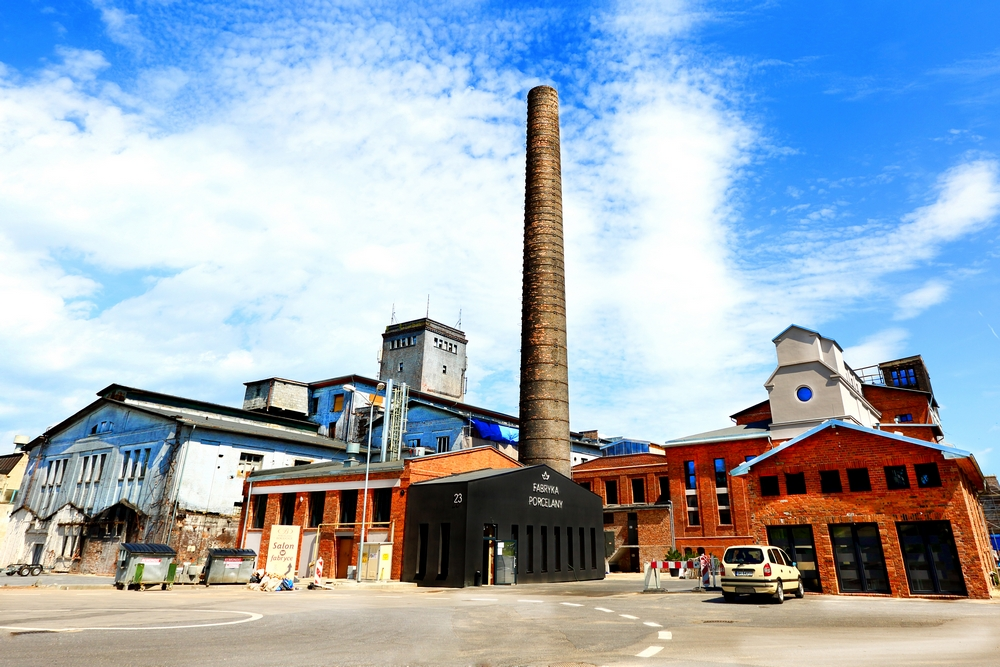
Buildings of Porcelana Śląska

In 1954, the porcelain factory was renamed Bogucice Porcelain Works and was then owned by the Polish Ceramics Association – Cerpol. It was taken over by Italian investors in 1994, and in the same year, production was taken over by the company Porcelana Śląska, which operated it until 2008. A year later, the factory went bankrupt. In 2012, the site of the former Porcelana Śląska factory was acquired by the civil law partnership Porcelana Śląska, which transformed the post-industrial site into the Porcelana Śląska industrial-technology park.

== Technical infrastructure ==
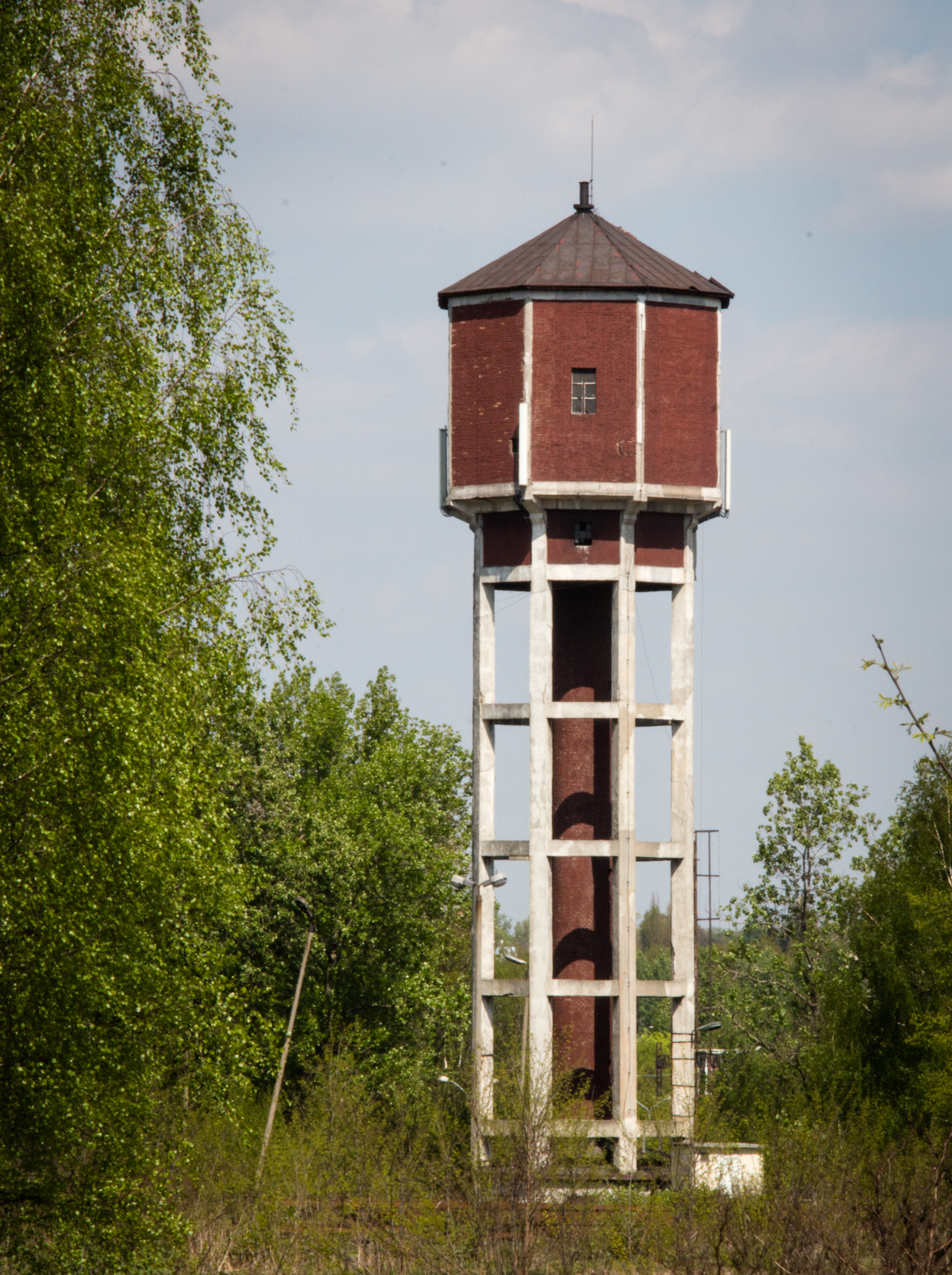
Water tower on Murckowska Street, in the area of the former Kunegunda Zinc Smelter

The supply of running water to Zawodzie is provided by the Mikołów and Murcki network reservoirs. These are fed from water treatment plants in Dziećkowice, Goczałkowice-Zdrój, and Kobiernice. This water is pumped into the common distribution system of the Upper Silesian Waterworks Company, from where, via a network of water mains and the associated distribution network of Katowice Waterworks, water is supplied to, among other areas, Zawodzie. The GPW transit water main in Zawodzie runs along Gospodarcza Street near the border with Janów-Nikiszowiec. Since 1919, Gmina Bogucice has been responsible for water supply to the area of Zawodzie and others, and the network at that time also included the former Kunegunda railway station. Since 1925, Ferrum SA and Kunegunda Zinc Smelter have been using the water tower built in the district. Since 1951, Zawodzie has been supplied from the Goczałkowice reservoir.

The Sewer Network Operations Branch – Center, which is part of Katowice Waterworks, is responsible for the operation of the sewer network in the district. The Zawodzie sewer system is located within the catchment area of the Gigablok wastewater treatment plant. It is a separate system, divided into sanitary and stormwater networks. In 1906, Max Rosenquist designed the sewer system on behalf of Gmina Bogucice's authorities. In Zawodzie, a separate system was built in 1908, along with a sewage treatment plant, which was located at the end of present-day Braci Stawowych Street (or near Jerzy Duda-Gracz Street, on the site of which the Municipal Taxi Company's depot was established after World War II), beside the Rawa river. It was a mechanical treatment plant, consisting of: a double sand trap, a pump house, settling tanks, and plots for drying sludge. The sewer system in the gmina was put into operation in November 1908.

The district is supplied with electricity via a 110-kV high-voltage grid connected to nearby power plants. The electrical grids run relatively densely through Zawodzie. There are three substations within the district's boundaries: Katowice (220/110/6 kV; at the intersection of Bohaterów Monte Cassino and Burowiecka streets), Bogucice (110/20/6 kV; at the intersection of K. Marcinkowski and S. Wyspiański streets), and Ferrum (110 kV; on the grounds of the Ferrum steelworks on Porcelanowa Street). They are connected by 110 kV lines, while the Katowice substation is additionally connected by a 220 kV line.

Zawodzie is supplied with heat from the former Katowice Power Station (currently the Katowice Production Unit), operated by Tauron Ciepło.

Gas in Zawodzie is supplied via a gas pipeline network. A high-pressure gas pipeline runs along the edge of the industrial areas south of the railroad tracks, near Porcelanowa Street. Two first-stage pressure-reducing and metering stations are also located there.

== Transport ==
=== Road transport ===
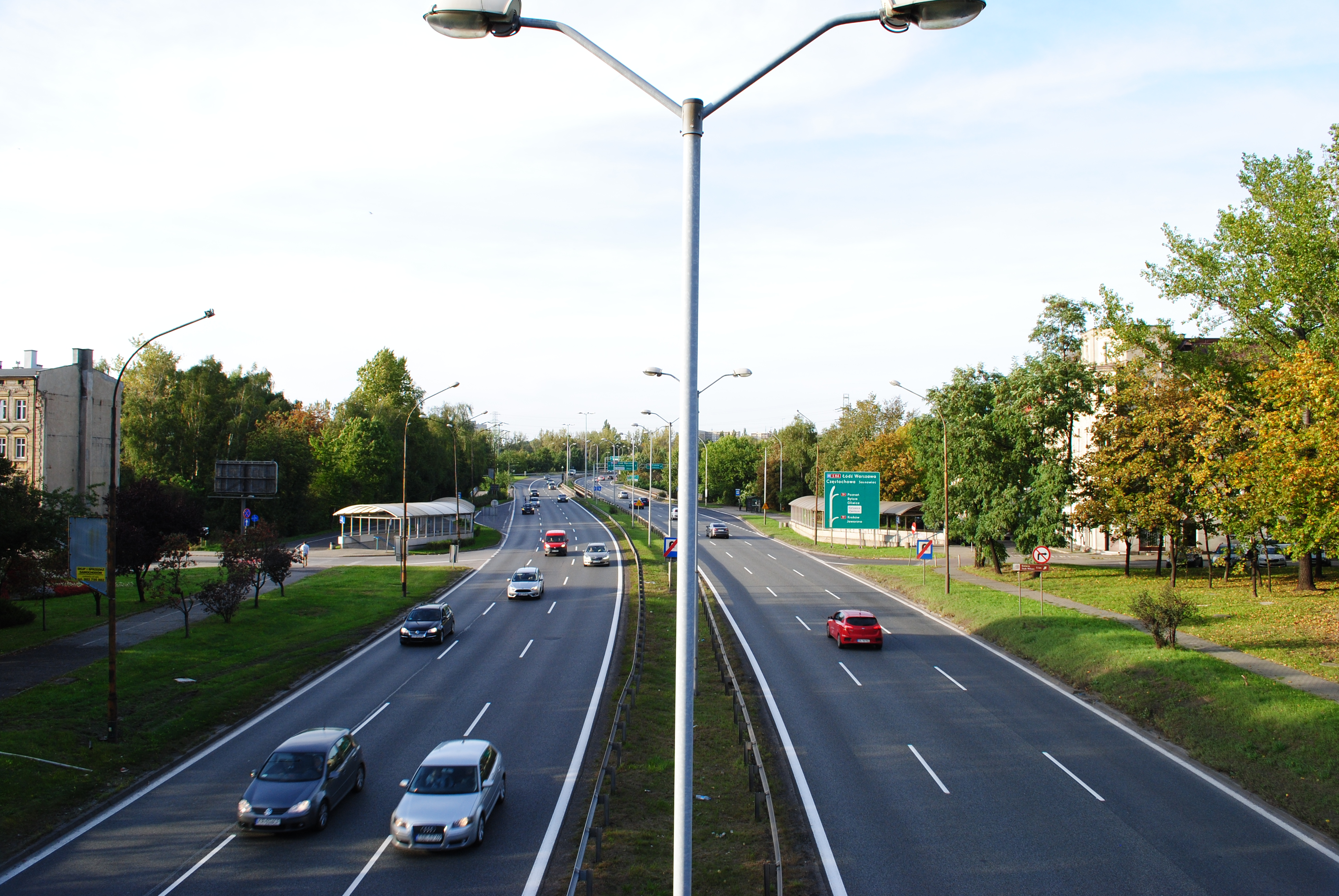
Murckowska Street as seen from the overpass along 1 Maja Street; view looking north

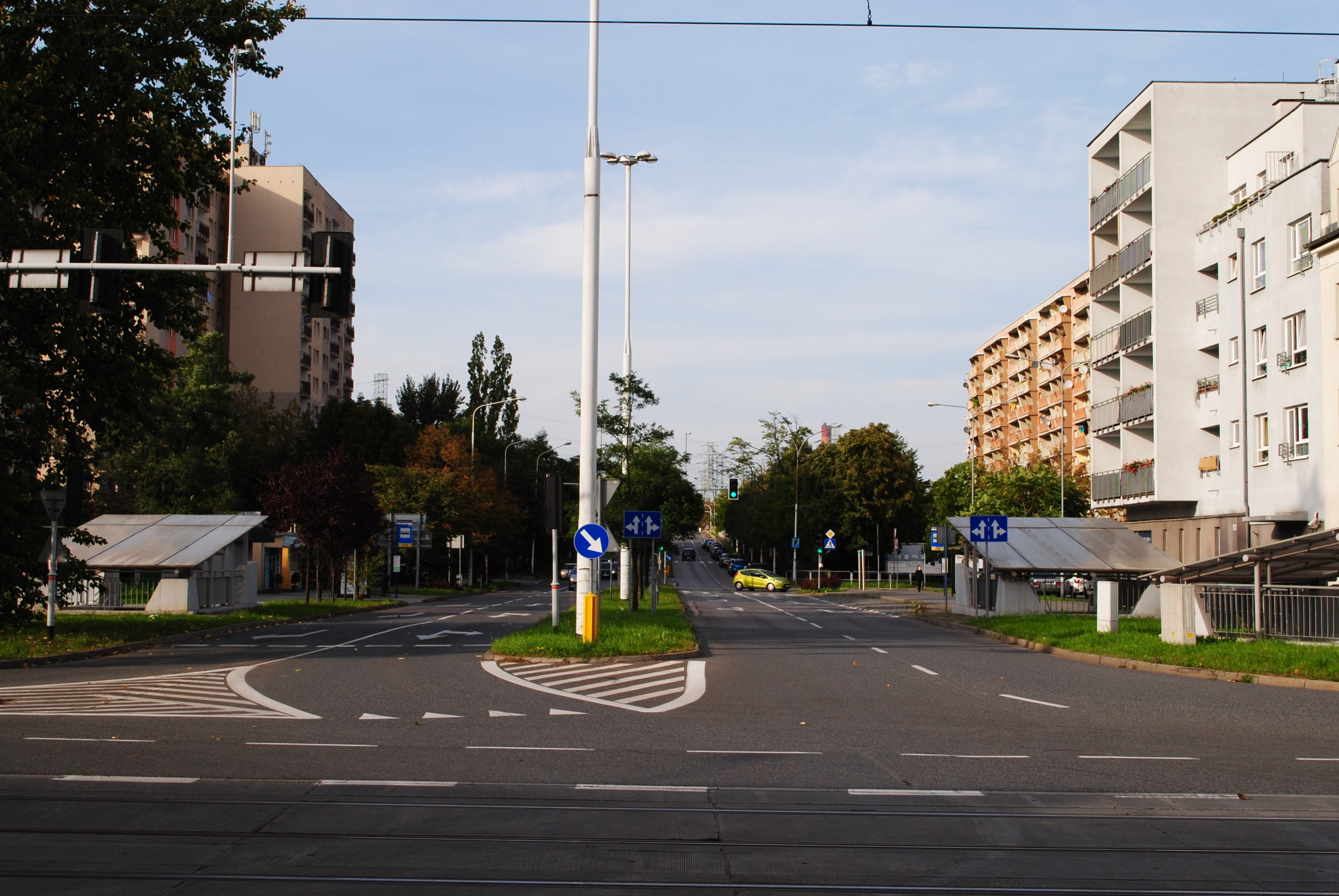
Bohaterów Monte Cassino Street near the intersection with 1 Maja Street

The following national roads and expressways pass through Zawodzie:

- National road 79 (Walenty Roździeński Avenue to the Bagienna junction and Bagienna Street) – one of Katowice's main thoroughfares. It crosses Zawodzie parallel to the meridian and provides a connection to the west with Chorzów and Bytom, and to the east with Mysłowice, Jaworzno, Chrzanów, and Kraków;
- Expressway S86 and national road 86 (Murckowska Street and Walenty Roździeński Avenue from the Bagienna junction) – one of Katowice's main thoroughfares. The section of the road along Walenty Roździeński Avenue from the junction with Murckowska Street toward Sosnowiec is a two-lane expressway. Its main function is to enable rapid connections between distant areas of the entire city. It connects Zawodzie to Tychy to the south and to Sosnowiec, Będzin, and Katowice Airport in Pyrzowice to the northeast. The average traffic volume in September 2007 during the afternoon rush hour along Walenty Roździeński Avenue at the intersection with Bogucicka Street was 6,581 vehicles per day, of which 90.2% were passenger cars.

The following streets are among the most important roads for traffic within the district:

- 1 Maja Street – the main street in Zawodzie, along which the district's historic buildings have developed. It is 2.8 km long and connects Śródmieście with the eastern districts. It is a distributor county road, running parallel to the equator;
- Bogucicka Street – a street approximately 400 meters long, running in a meridian direction. It is a local county road, connecting Walenty Roździeński Avenue (with its eastbound lane) in the north with 1 Maja Street in the south;
- Bohaterów Monte Cassino Street – a street approximately 1,580 meters long, running in a meridian direction. It is a main county road, connecting Zawodzie at the intersection with 1 Maja Street with Bogucice near Osiedle Kukuczki;
- Jerzy Duda-Gracz Street – a distributor county road, running north-south, connecting Zawodzie in the north with the area around the Silesian Museum and Osiedle Walentego Roździeńskiego, where it joins Walenty Roździeński Avenue and T. Dobrowolski Street in Bogucice;
- Graniczna Street – a distributor county road, connecting Zawodzie in the south, at the intersection with Warszawska, J. Duda-Gracz, and 1 Maja streets with Osiedle Paderewskiego-Muchowiec near Osiedle Paderewskiego. It runs north–south. Within the boundaries of Zawodzie there is a short northern section of the street leading to the railroad tracks;
- Stanisław Staszic Street – an access gmina road, running entirely within Zawodzie, following a meridian route, along which the J. Ziętek School Complex No. 1 is located.

=== Rail transport ===
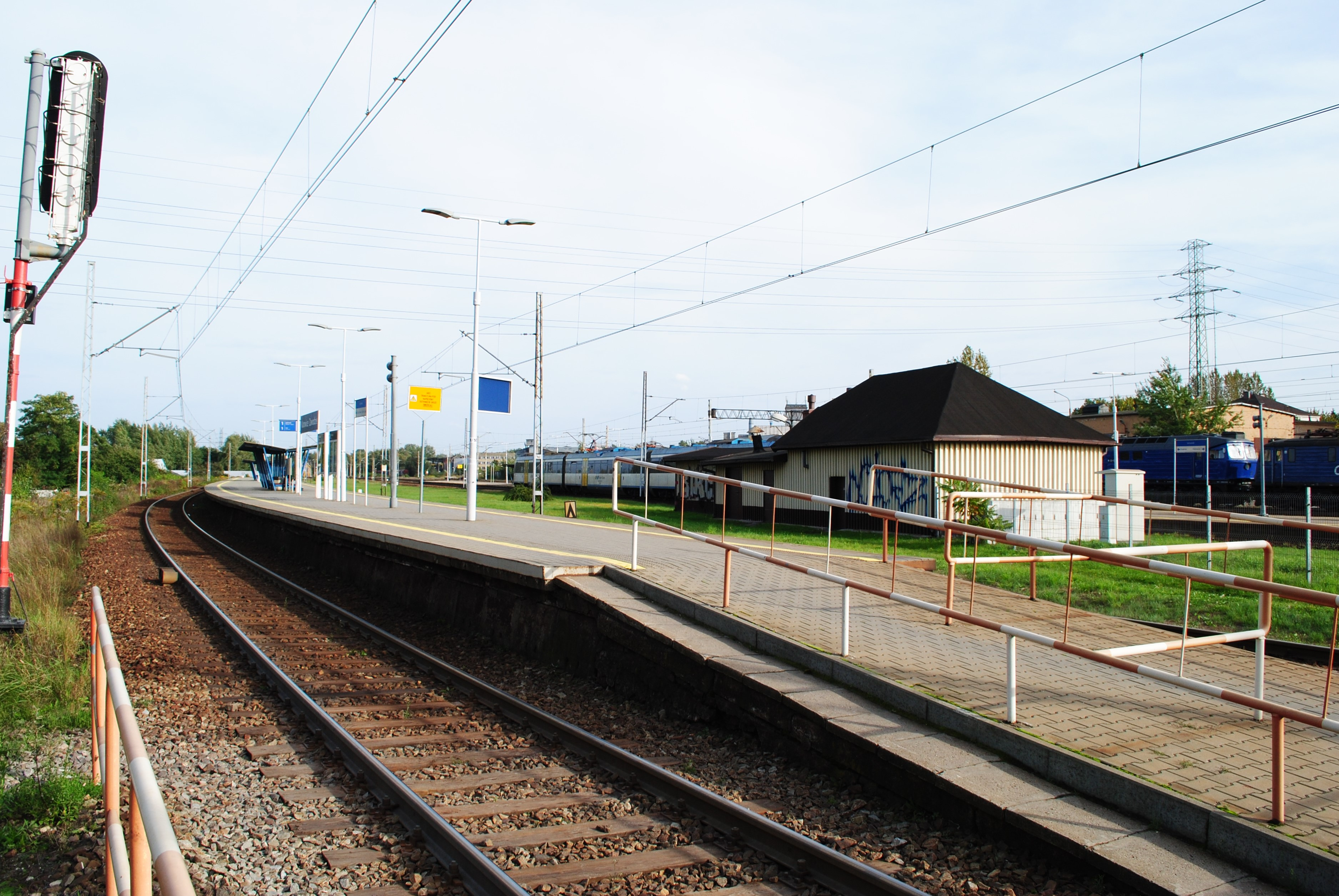
Platforms at Katowice Zawodzie railway station from the northwest

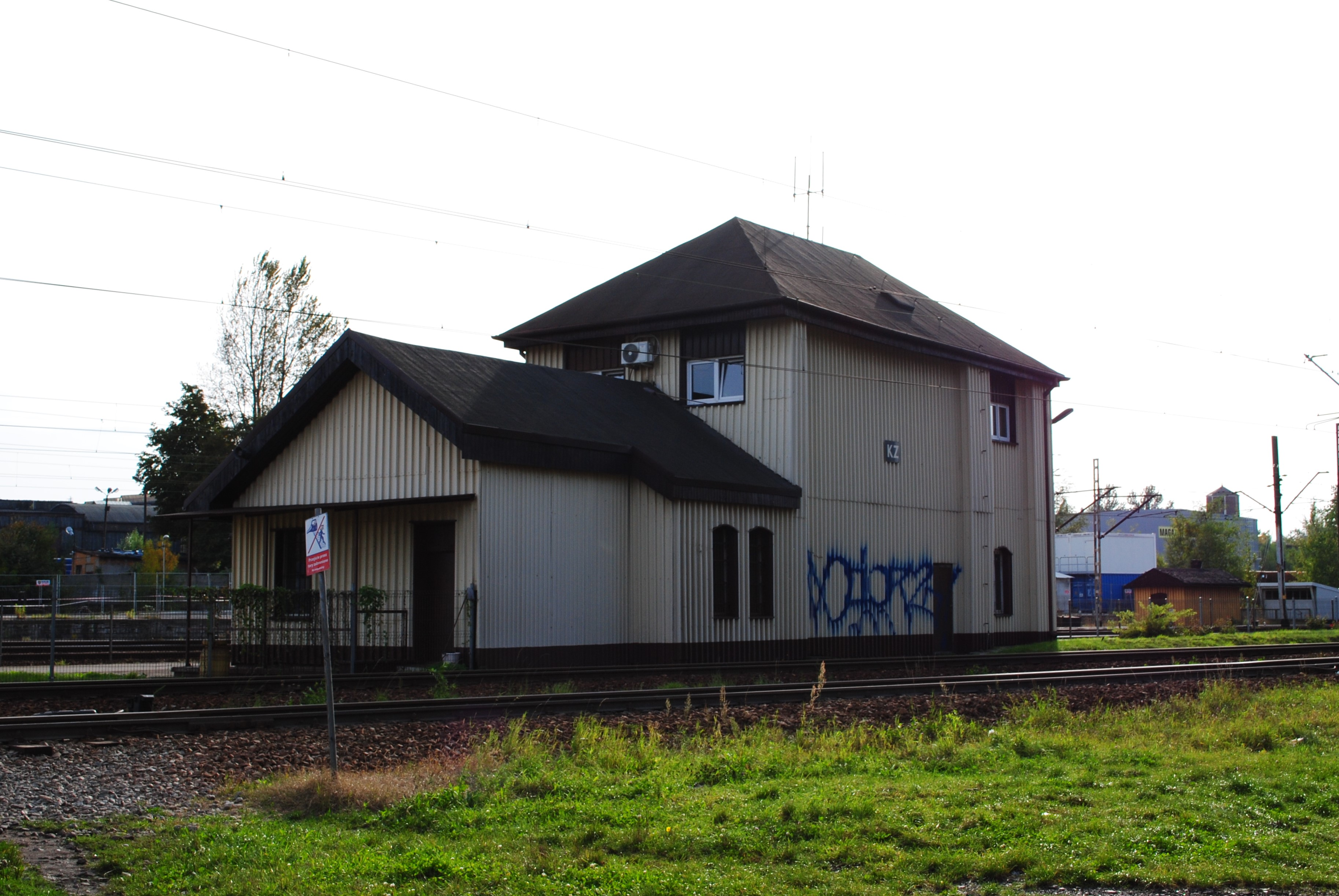
One of the buildings at Katowice Zawodzie railway station

The Katowice Zawodzie railway station is located in Zawodzie, near P. Chromik Street. It has two platforms and four platform edges. It also has, among other things, additional siding tracks and light signals, and no ticket office. The modern station was built in 1861 on the Upper Silesian Railway railway and was then known as Kunigundeweiche. It has had its current name since 1996 – previously, it was known as Bogucice (1922–1925) and Katowice Bogucice (1926–1939, 1945–1953, and 1956–1996). In May 2022, passenger trains operated by Silesian Railways and Polregio stopped at the station, and the main destinations at that time were: Chałupki, Częstochowa, Gliwice, Katowice, Kraków Główny, Oświęcim, Racibórz, Sędziszów, Sławków, and Tychy Lodowisko. Direct connections to Busko-Zdrój and Rzeszów Główny also ran from the station.

The earliest railway built in Zawodzie is Oświęcim–Katowice railway, which runs parallel to the district between Katowice railway station in the west and the Katowice Szopienice Południowe railway station in the east. Along part of this section, the district's border with Osiedle Paderewskiego-Muchowiec also runs parallel to it. The railway was built by the Upper Silesian Railway Company as part of the route connecting Katowice with Mysłowice and was put into service on 3 October 1846. By 1856, it had gained a second track, and on 14 May 1959, its electrified section was put into service. Regular passenger and freight traffic operates on this railway.

On 24 August 1859, the Upper Silesian Railway Company built a section of track toward Sosnowiec Główny, connecting the city to Katowice via Zawodzie (the present-day Warszawa Zachodnia–Katowice railway). A second track was added by 1915, and on 1 June 1957, the railway was electrified. Within the district, it runs parallel to Oświęcim–Katowice railway. It carries both passenger and freight traffic.

On 1 November 1861, a railway spur connecting Zawodzie with Dąbrówka Mała was opened. It ran parallel to present-day P. Chromik Street, Braci Stawowych Street, and between the Gigablok Sewage Treatment Plant, as well as the industrial and commercial areas north of the plant. Passenger service on the railway continued until 1 April 1968, and in 1976, the railway track that crossed 1 Maja Street near the intersection with K. Marcinkowski Street was closed and later dismantled. Another railway ran from Zawodzie toward Janów and Murcki. It was put into service on 17 June 1900 and carried freight traffic; however, the section of this line in Zawodzie was dismantled before 2014.

Zawodzie was also an intersection point for numerous industrial rail spurs, including those of the Upper Silesian Narrow-Gauge Railways, which were used mainly to transport raw materials and semi-finished products between industrial plants. These spurs connected to the Kunegunda Zinc Smelter (operational from 1856 to 1963) and Ferrum SA (until 1961).

=== Public transport ===
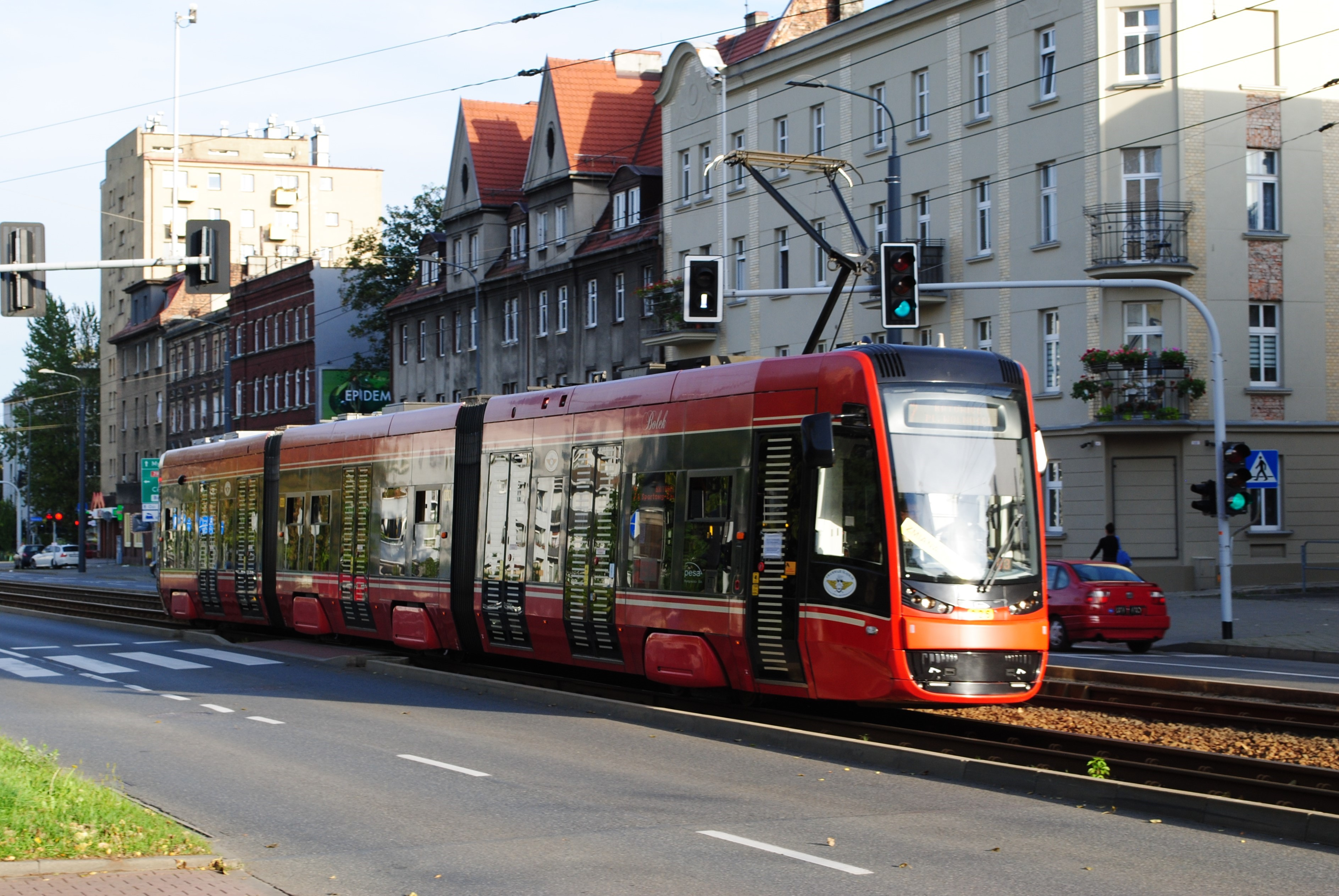
Pesa Twist 2012N tram along 1 Maja Street

Public transportation in Zawodzie is organized by the Metropolitan Transport Authority, which took over these responsibilities from previous operators on 1 January 2019. Public transportation within the district is provided both by bus routes and, on behalf of Silesian Interurbans, by trams.

As of mid-May 2022, there are 9 bus stops in Zawodzie: Zawodzie Bohaterów Monte Cassino, Zawodzie Centrum Przesiadkowe, Zawodzie Centrum Przesiadkowe Parking, Zawodzie Łączna, Zawodzie Ośrodek Sportowy, Zawodzie Paderewskiego, Zawodzie Uniwersytet Ekonomiczny, Zawodzie Waleriana, and Zawodzie Zajezdnia. The following additional stops also operated within the district's boundaries: Katowice Cmentarz Komunalny, Katowice Fabryka Porcelany, Katowice Graniczna (on 1 Maja Street), Katowice Hutnicza, Katowice Porcelanowa (stop in the northbound direction), Katowice Porcelanowa Zakłady, and Katowice Strefa Kultury (stop in the eastbound direction).

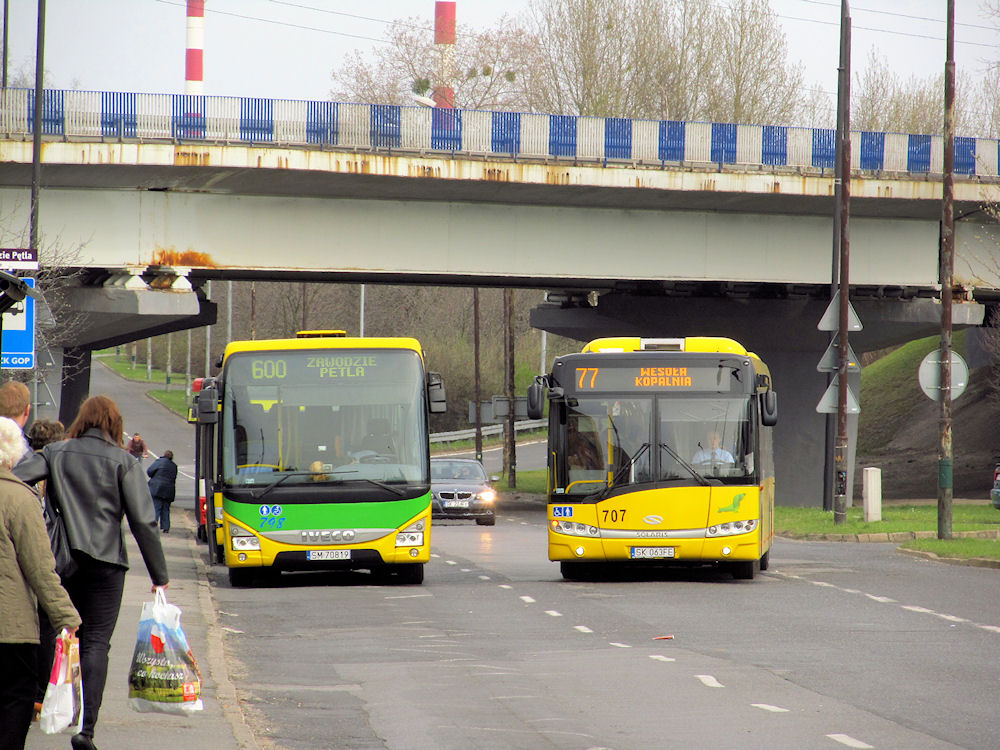
Public transport buses at the former Zawodzie Pętla stop (2015)

The transit hub near the Zawodzie Transit Center on 1 Maja Street serves exclusively as a transportation hub. The center consists of two platforms, additional tram tracks, and 16 bus bays, as well as a 175-space car parking lot, a bicycle parking area, and a park and ride point. The transit center building houses a waiting area and two retail outlets. There are two stops there: Zawodzie Centrum Przesiadkowe and Zawodzie Centrum Przesiadkowe Parking. As of mid-May 2022, 13 bus lines departed from the first stop, including one night line connecting various areas of Metropolis GZM, as well as 14 tram lines.

The Zawodzie Paderewskiego stop serves an average of 700 passengers per hour. It is exclusively a tram stop, from which a total of 13 lines departed in both directions in mid-May 2022. These lines connected this part of Zawodzie with certain districts of Katowice, including Dąb, Osiedle Tysiąclecia, Szopienice-Burowiec, Śródmieście, Wełnowiec-Józefowiec, and Załęże, as well as other cities: Bytom, Chorzów, Mysłowice, Sosnowiec, and Siemianowice Śląskie.

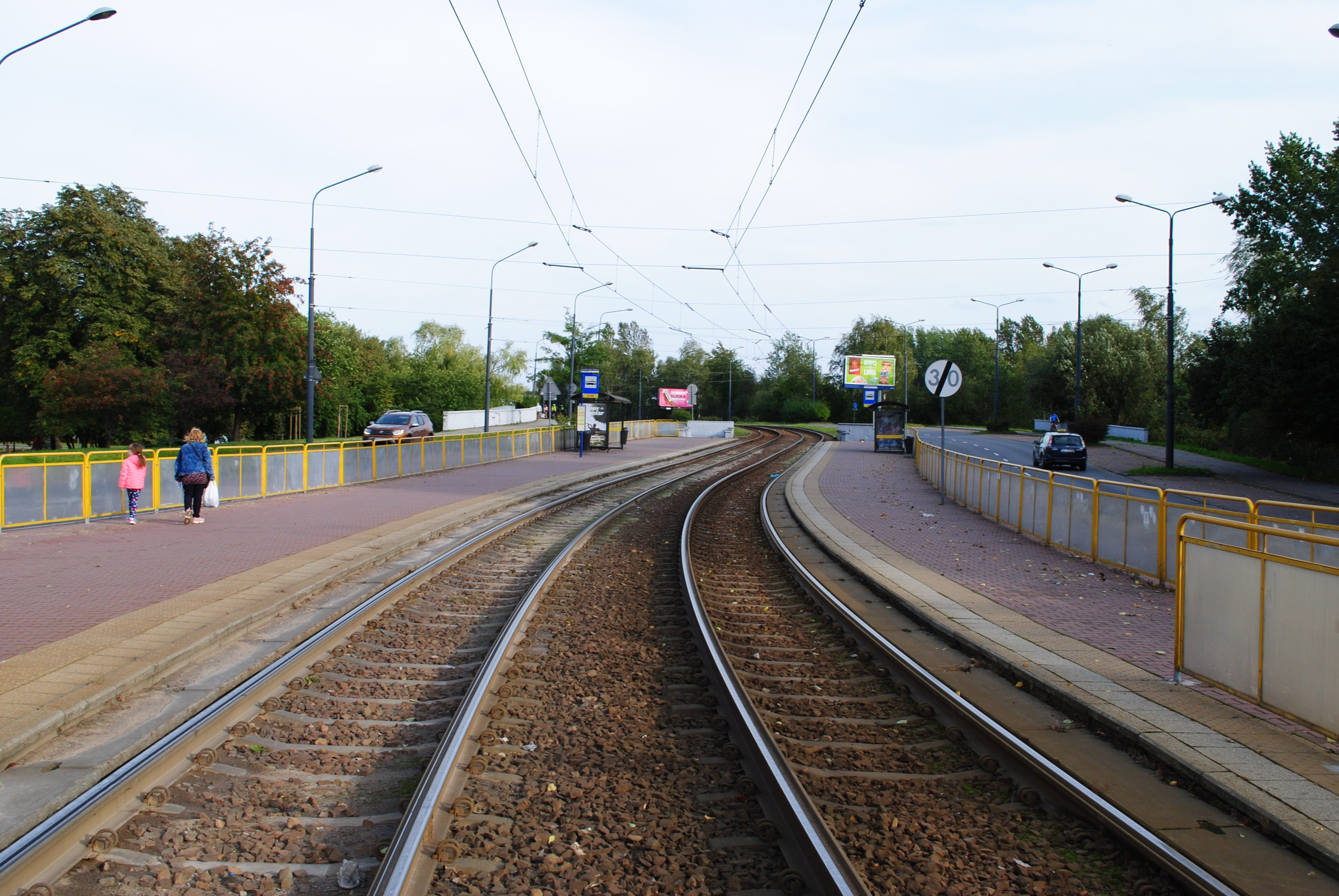
Zawodzie Uniwersytet Ekonomiczny tram stop (1 Maja Street)

The history of the tram line running through Zawodzie dates back to the late 19th century. In 1893, the company Schikora & Wolff, headquartered in Katowice, was established. On 29 December 1897, it obtained a partial concession to construct a tram route between Świętochłowice, Hajduki, Załęże, Katowice, Zawodzie, and Mysłowice. The following year, the company transferred its rights to a consortium of several banking houses, which on 27 May 1898 established the joint-stock company Oberschlesische Kleinbahnen und Elektrizitätswerke A.G. The line on the section from Katowice to Zawodzie was built by Kramer & Co. in 1898, and on 23 June 1900, the section between Zawodzie and Bagno, owned by Kramer & Co., and the section between Bagno and Roździeń, owned by Oberschlesische Kleinbahnen und Elektrizitätswerke, were accepted. The tram line connecting Katowice with Mysłowice via Zawodzie was put into service on 7 August 1899.

A plan was also drawn up to build a tram line connecting Zawodzie with Bogucice and Dąbrówka Mała, but it was never implemented. In Zawodzie, this line was to run along Bogucicka Street.

After World War I, work began on converting the network to standard gauge – standard-gauge operation along the entire route from Katowice to Sosnowiec was launched on 8 December 1928. A tram terminus was built in Zawodzie between 1943 and 1944. In the postwar period, a substation was commissioned in Zawodzie in 1947, and between 1958 and 1962, construction was underway on a tram depot with a capacity of 118 cars, which was commissioned in February 1962. In its vicinity, on 1 Maja Street, a bus depot was opened in 1972. Between 2007 and 2009, the tram tracks running along 1 Maja Street were modernized. As part of the work, the tram rails and subgrade were replaced, and the stops were rebuilt.

In mid-December 2017, the construction site for the Zawodzie transit hub, located in the area of Bagienna, Krakowska, and 1 Maja streets, was handed over. The transit hub was opened on 7 December 2020 when the first passengers were able to use the new facility. The cost of constructing the hub was 95.2 million zloty.

== Architecture and urban planning ==
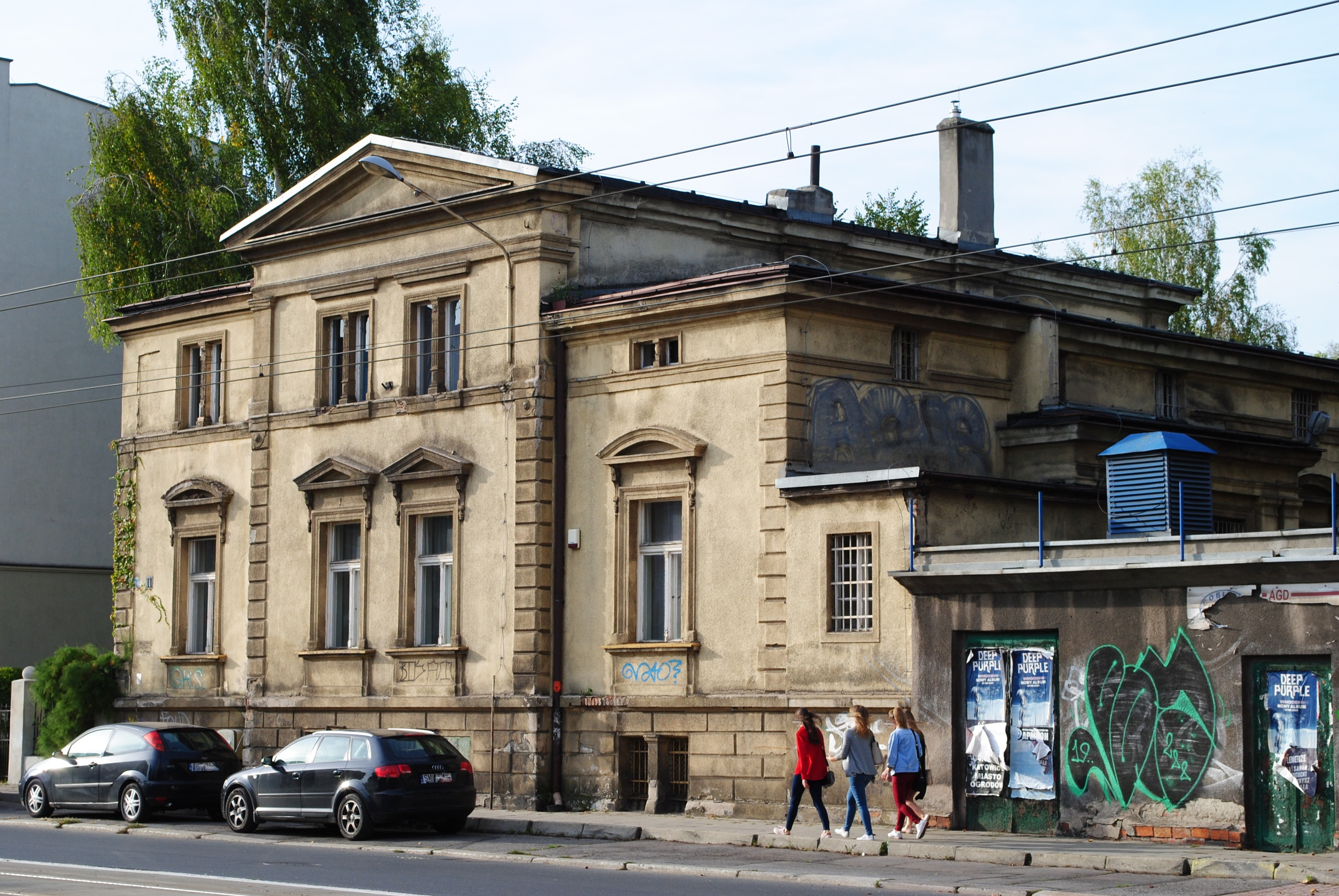
Historic villa at 11 1 Maja Street, built in the early 20th century

Zawodzie is characterized by great diversity in terms of architecture and urban planning. The district has a number of buildings dating from various periods and of differing architectural value. At the turn of the 19th and 20th centuries, Zawodzie underwent significant architectural and urban development, especially along 1 Maja Street. As Zawodzie developed and industrialized, single-story rural dwellings with small gardens were replaced by 2- to 4-story bourgeois tenements. By the end of the 19th century, the district's buildings had taken on a distinctly urban character. The buildings from the late 19th century that exist today are located in various parts of Zawodzie, with the largest concentration on 1 Maja Street, including buildings numbered: 6, 15, 23, 37, 45, 49, 87, 102, 125, 127, 131, and 154. Also dating from the late 19th century are the buildings at 13 Graniczna Street, 1 I. J. Paderewski Street, 10 and 12 Walerian Street, 10 P. Niedurny Street (from the 1880s), and 13 K. Marcinkowski Street.

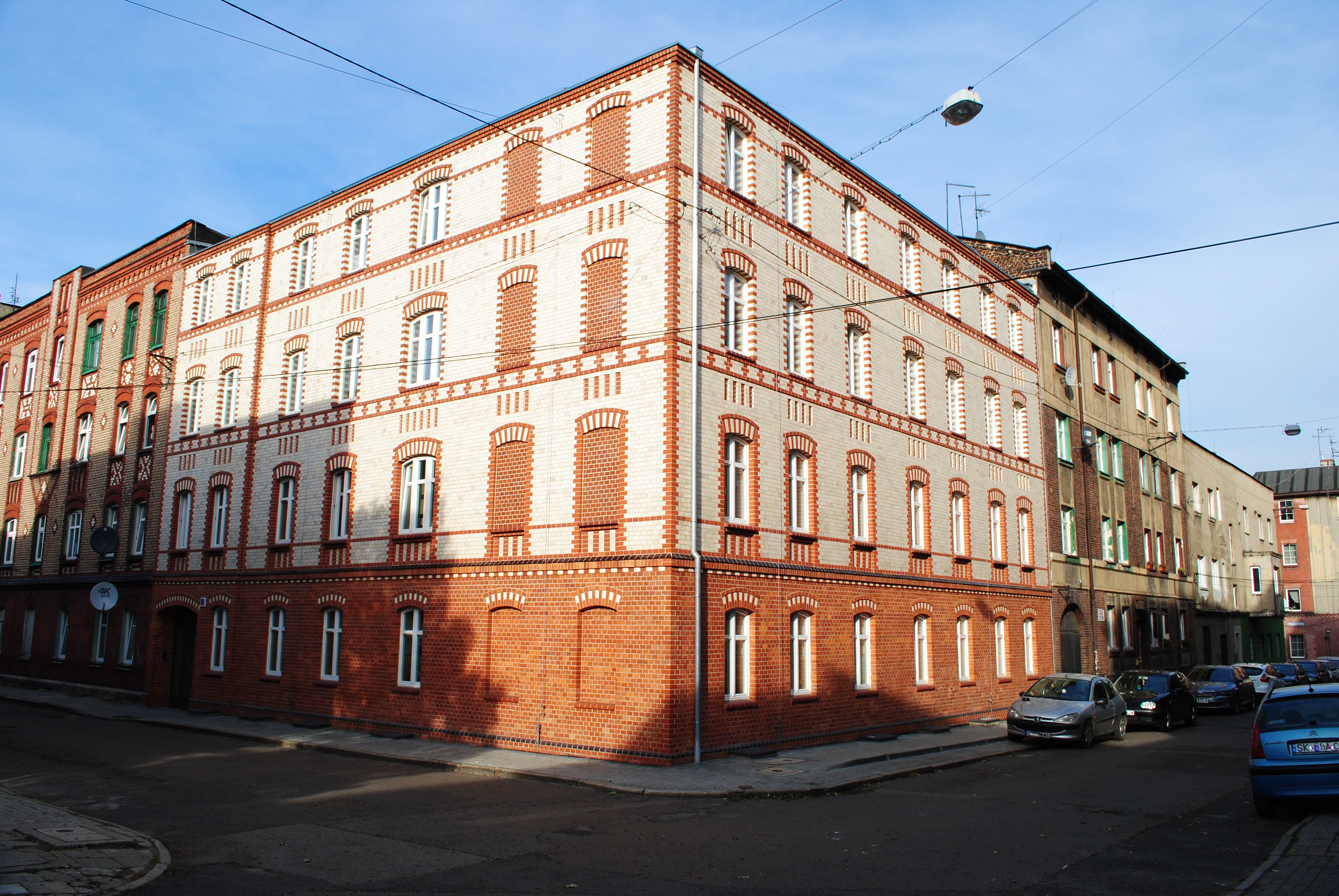
Historic tenements at the intersection of Karol and S. Czarniecki streets

A relatively large proportion of Zawodzie's buildings was constructed between 1900 and 1922. This development spread mainly west of Murckowska Street and is concentrated along 1 Maja Street, while the eastern side saw the construction of most of the present-day buildings on Walerian, G. Hałubek, P. Niedurny, Racławicka, and P. Chromik streets. Between 1900 and 1901, a workers' colony for the Ferrum steelworks was built in the area of today's Bulwary Rawy housing estate. At that time, 31 buildings were constructed according to a design by Jakub Weissenberg, including residential houses and the so-called "Rest House" (currently the headquarters of the Zawodzie branch of the Bogucice-Zawodzie Municipal Cultural Center). The colony existed until the 1990s. In 1912, the Gmina Bogucice town hall was opened on 1 Maja Street. It was built in the Neoclassical style and currently serves as the headquarters of the University of Economics. It was built between 1911 and 1912 on the initiative of what would later become the Katowice Joint-Stock Company for Mining and Metallurgy, and the building was designed by Arnold Hartmann from Berlin.

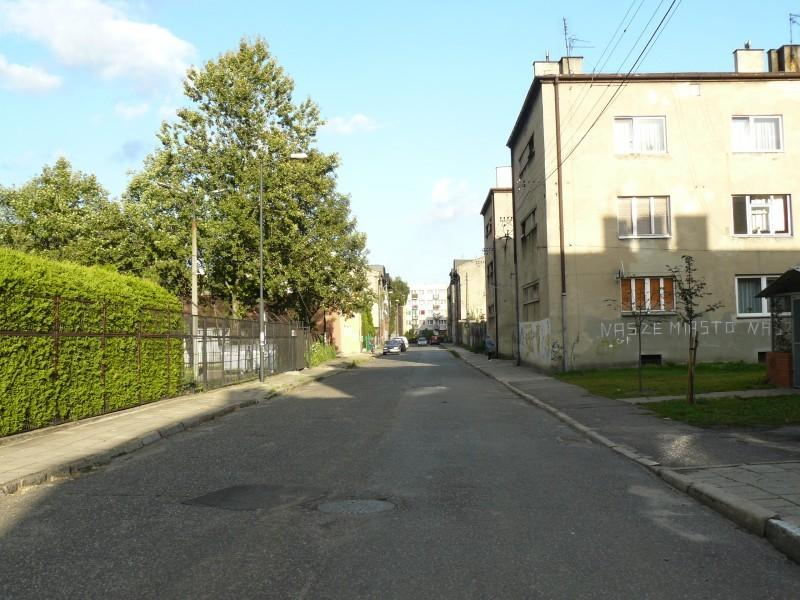
Cynkowa Street; on the right, a section of the Pierwsza Potrzeba housing estate from between 1935 and 1937

In 1930, construction began on the Church of the Divine Providence on present-day 1 Maja Street. The building was designed by Tadeusz Łobosz. Construction of the church was completed a year later, while finishing work, including the erection of a freestanding tower, continued until 1937. The church has a simple, massive silhouette of a horizontal cubic structure. Between 1935 and 1937, a housing estate for the unemployed – known as Pierwsza Potrzeba – was built on Cynkowa Street. It was developed with the participation of the Katowice municipal government. It consists of four uniform apartment blocks containing 72 flats and a former kindergarten building. In addition, individual buildings were constructed in Zawodzie during the interwar period.

The postwar phase of Zawodzie's architectural and urban development, which lasted from 1945 to the late 1980s, was mainly associated with the construction of large housing estates, the expansion of the road network (including Walenty Roździeński Avenue and Murckowska Street), and the development of higher education institutions. In the early years of the Polish People's Republic, up until the 1970s, new development in Zawodzie took place mostly outside the compact frontage of 1 Maja Street. Buildings from this period include, among others, the residential buildings at 110, 112, and 112 1 Maja Street (from the early 1960s), 5 Racławicka Street (from 1969), and 7 P. Niedurny Street (from the 1950s). Between 1947 and 1949, the building of the Ignacy Jan Paderewski X High School was constructed at 6 K. Miarka Street.

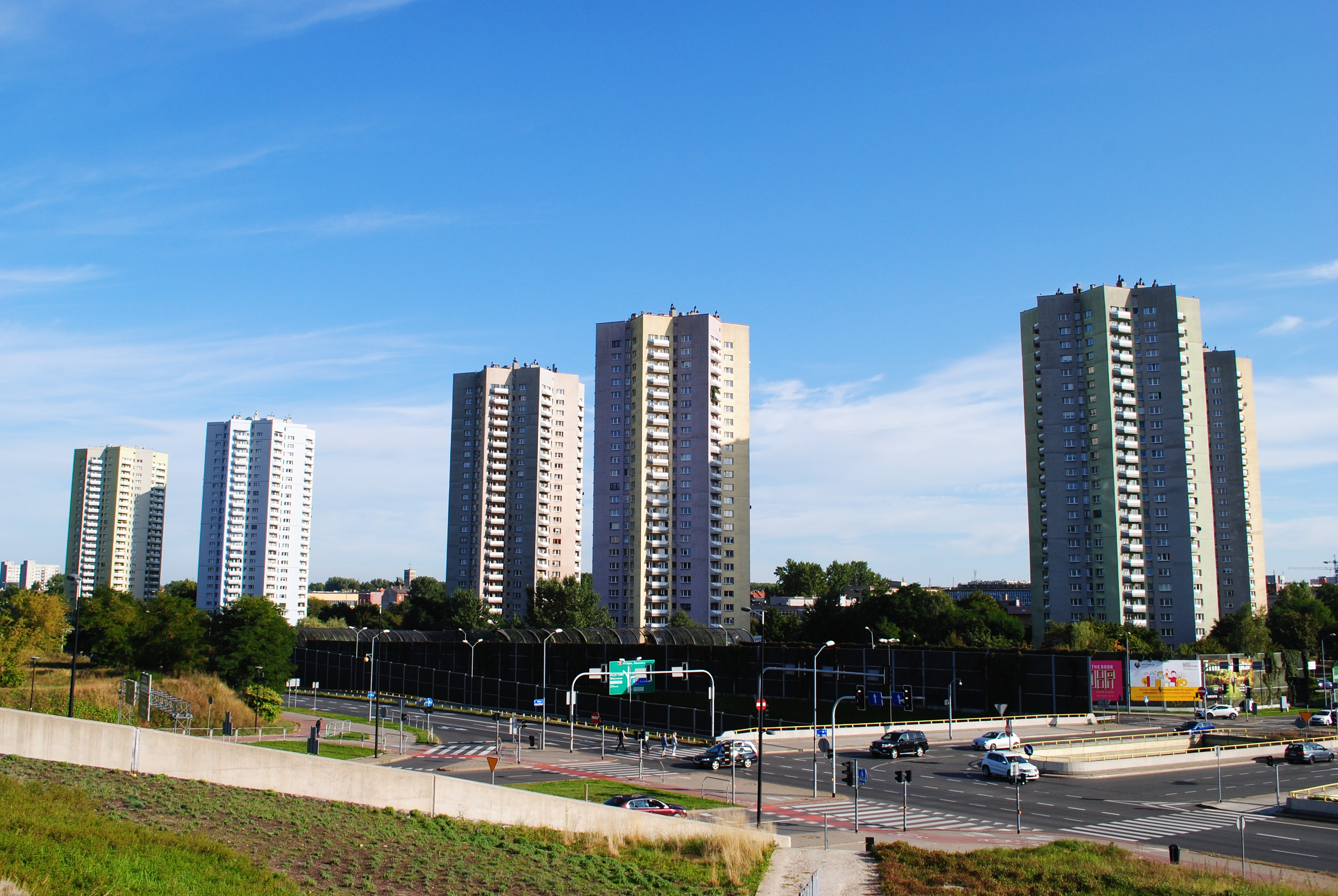
Osiedle Walentego Roździeńskiego, built in the 1970s; view from the northwest

Osiedle Walentego Roździeńskiego was built in the 1970s. The project was completed in two phases. In the first phase, carried out between 1972 and 1978, three residential high-rises and a school were built, while the second phase took place between 1980 and 1982 and included the construction of four additional high-rises and a retail and service complex. The housing estate was designed by architects Henryk Buszko, Aleksander Franta, and Tadeusz Szewczyk. Located within the district's boundaries, Osiedle Walentego Roździeńskiego is characterized by the highest net floor area ratio (1.96) among Katowice's other estates, as well as the highest average number of stories – 16.3. The proportion of built-up area within the estate's total area is 12%. It consists of seven residential high-rises, also known as the "Stars" (Gwiazdy). Each has 24 stories, and the height of each building reaches 75 meters. They are located at 86, 86a, 88, 90, 96, 98, and 100 Walenty Roździeński Avenue. Four of the residential high-rises in the estate are managed by the Stars Estate Administration of the Katowice Housing Cooperative, headquartered at 86a Walenty Roździeński Avenue.

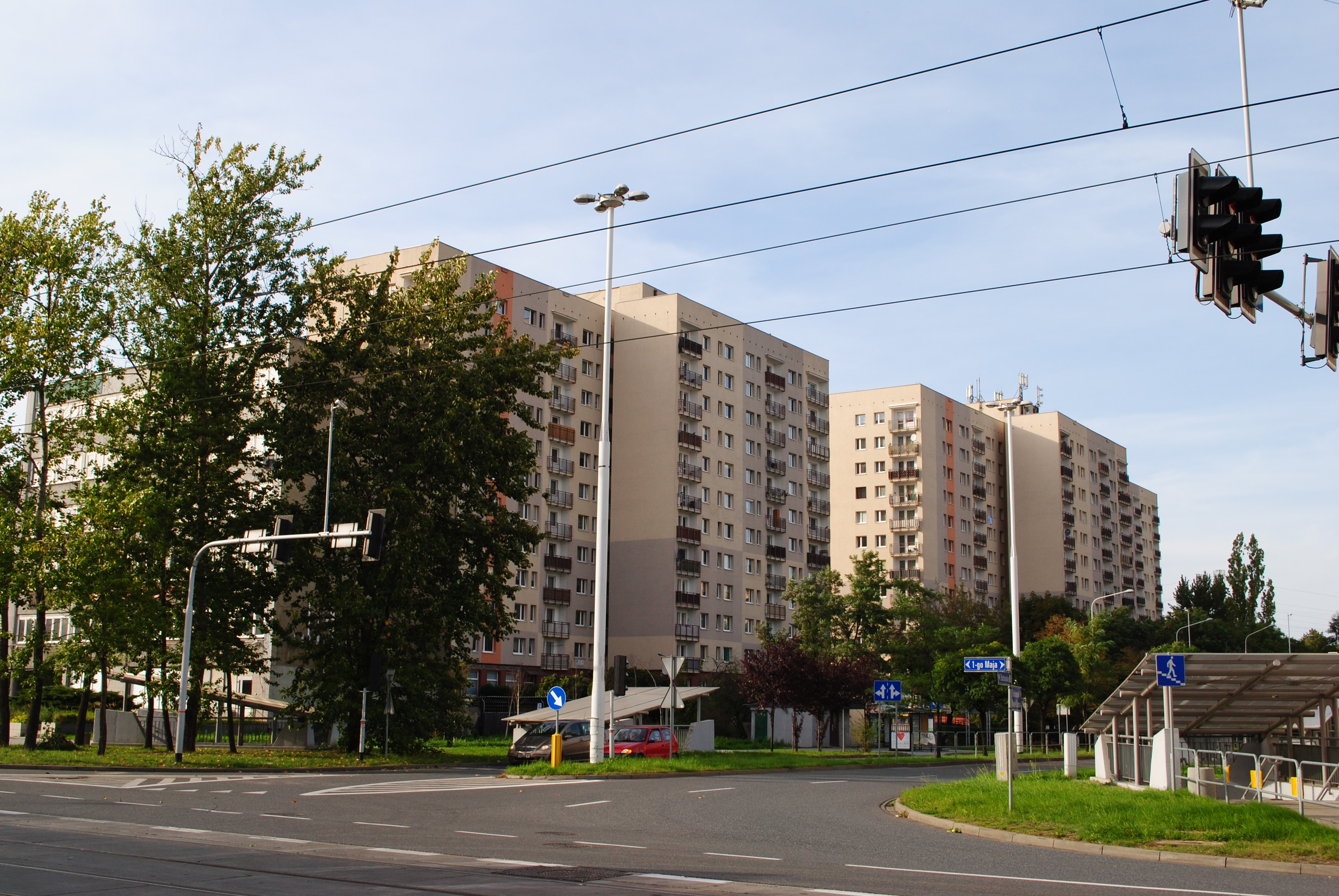
Residential buildings on Bohaterów Monte Cassino Street from the late 1970s

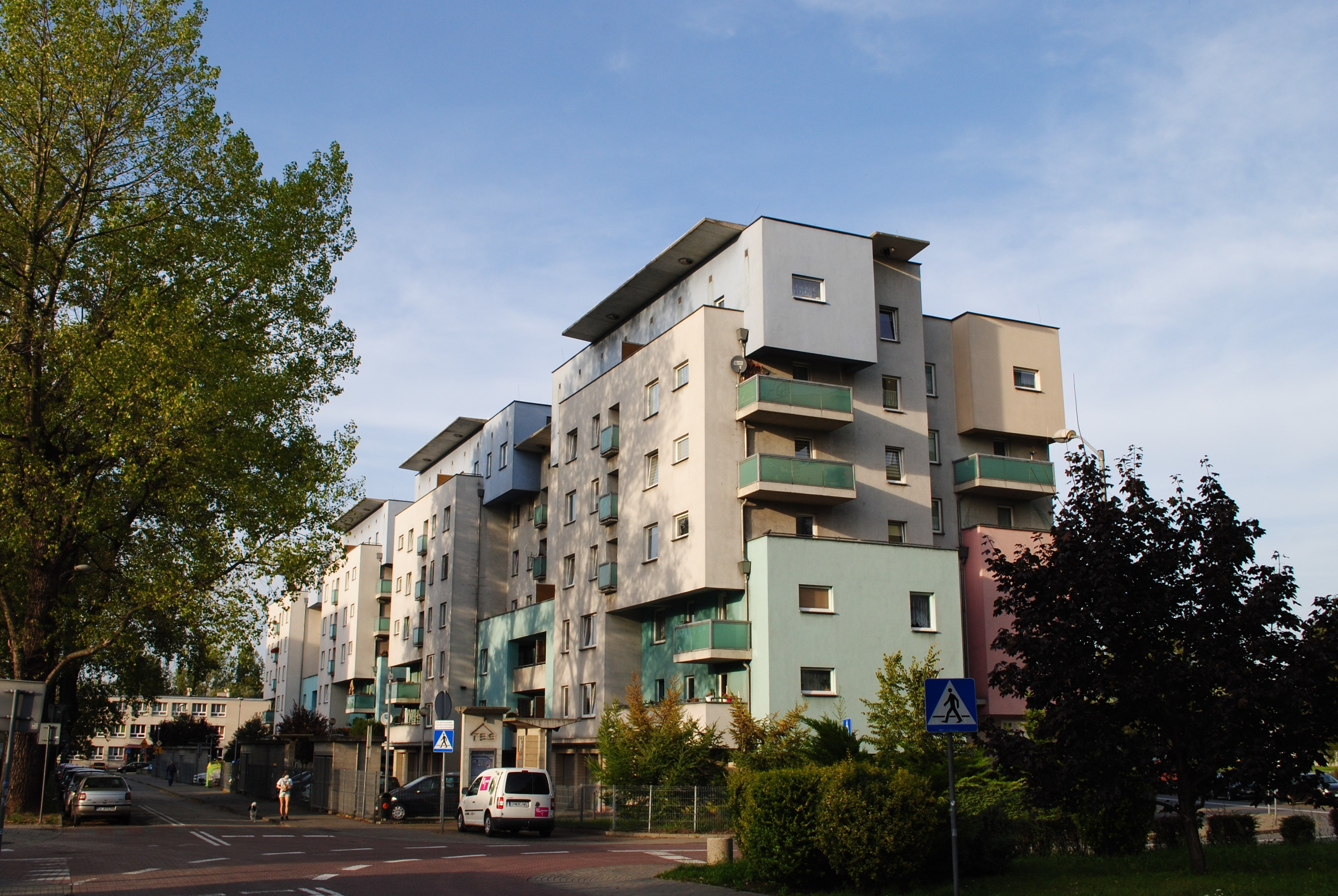
Part of the Bulwary Rawy housing estate – residential buildings from the third phase of the estate on K. Marcinkowski Street

In 1975, work began on the redevelopment of Zawodzie's transportation network. To this end, a year later, some of the buildings on 1 Maja Street on the section between Murckowska and S. Żółkiewski streets were demolished, and in 1978, similar work took place on Bohaterów Monte Cassino Street. There, as well as in the area of P. Chromik and Łączna streets, new apartment buildings were built, designed by architect Andrzej Trybus. The housing estate on Bohaterów Monte Cassino Street is also known as Osiedle Dawida, and was formerly called Zawodzie II. Of the eight planned buildings, only three apartment blocks were completed. The postwar Zawodzie housing estate, located in Zawodzie, is managed by the Katowice Housing Cooperative. It consists of 31 multi-family buildings, inhabited by 3,251 people as of April 2020. Its headquarters are located at 5 Bohaterów Monte Cassino Street. The estate consists of buildings situated on 1 Maja, Bohaterów Monte Cassino, G. Hałubek, Łączna, Piaskowa, Racławicka, and S. Staszic streets.

The current urban development of Zawodzie, which has been underway since the early 1990s, is characterized by the growth of new, small residential developments, the expansion of the road network, the removal of a significant portion of railways and sidings, as well as economic transformations that led, among other things, to the gradual closure of polluting industrial plants and the revitalization of post-industrial areas. In 1999, construction began on the Bulwary Rawy housing estate in the area of K. Marcinkowski, Braci Stawowych, Bohaterów Monte Cassino, and 1 Maja streets. By August 2011, four phases had been completed. The first phase involved the construction of six buildings with a total of 204 apartments, the second phase included one four-section building with 154 apartments, the third phase saw the completion of 198 apartments, and the fourth phase involved one four-section building with 165 apartments.

Between 2011 and 2013, construction work was carried out on the Center for Modern Information Technologies building, which opened in November 2013. It is located at 5 Bogucicka Street. The building's total usable floor area is 7,800 m². During the same period, from 2011 to 2013, the University of Economics' administration building underwent renovation. As part of the work, the turret crowning the building was rebuilt, having been destroyed during World War II.

=== Historic buildings ===
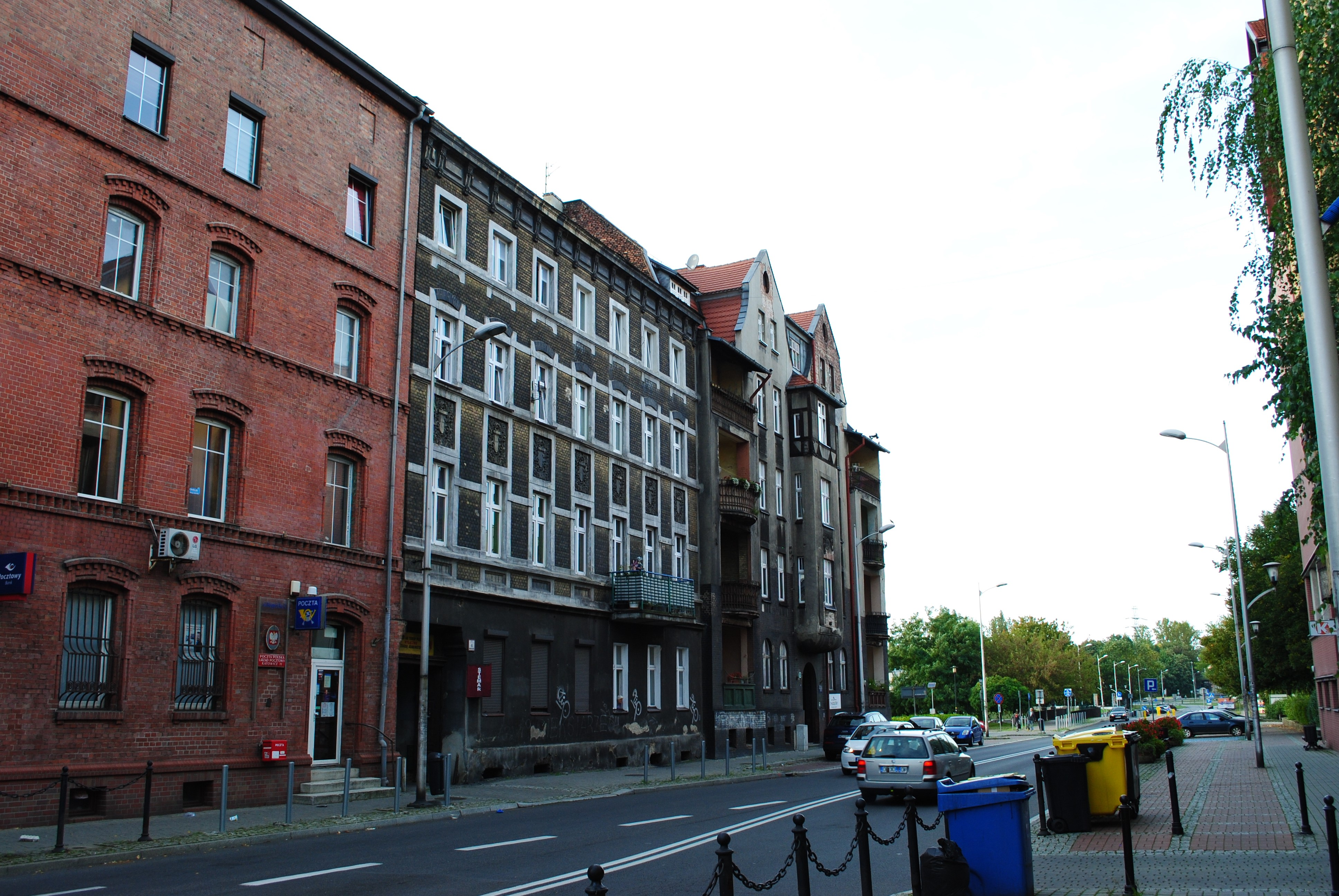
Fragment of the historic buildings of Zawodzie (Bogucicka Street); on the right, the historic tenement at no. 6

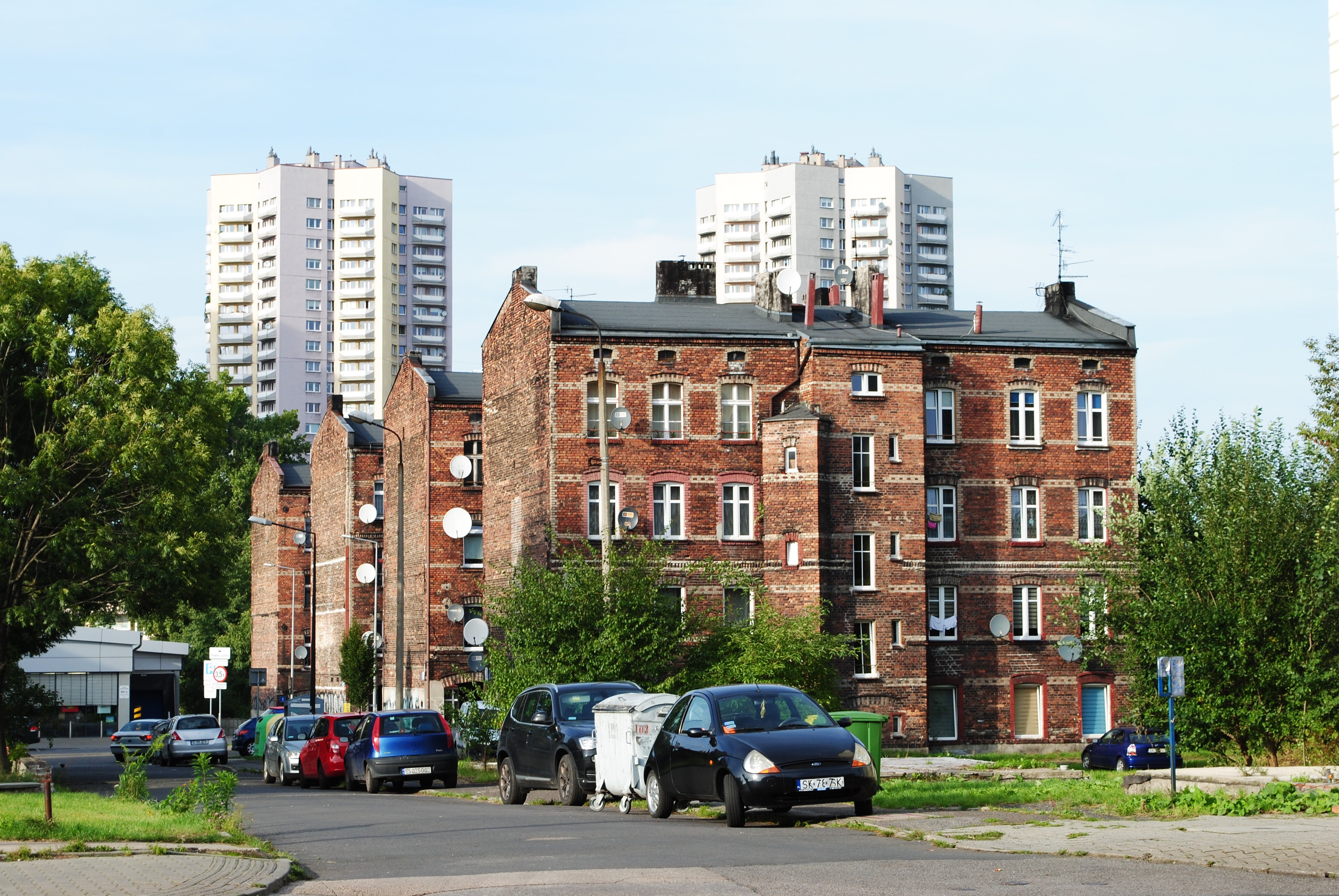
Familok complex at 2, 3, 4, and 5 Długa Street; in the background, a section of Osiedle Walentego Roździeńskiego

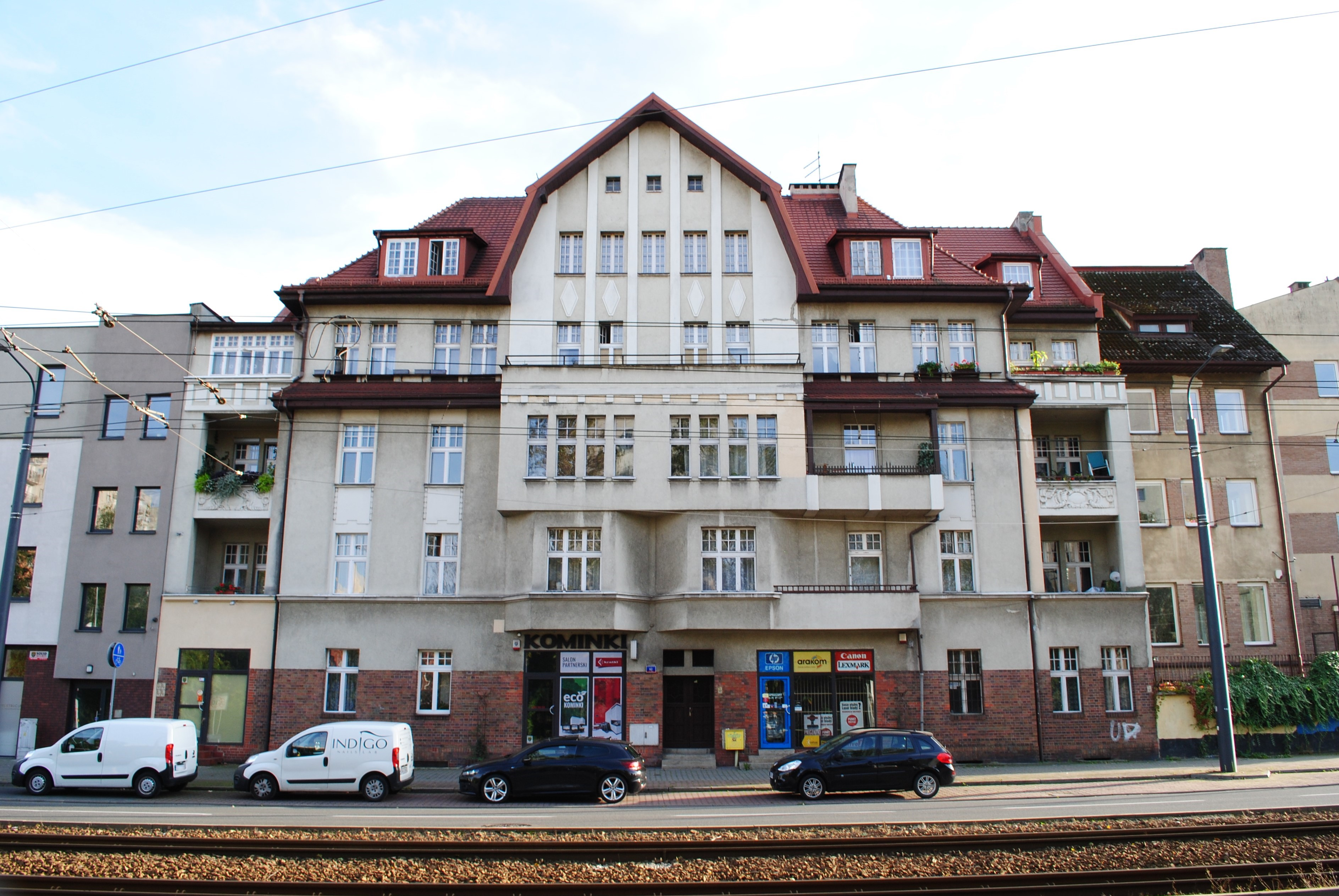
Tenement at 92 1 Maja Street

The following buildings, listed in the Registry of Cultural Property, are located within the boundaries of Zawodzie:

- Former Gmina Bogucice town hall (50 1 Maja Street) – currently the seat of the rector's office of the University of Economics; registry no. A/679/2020, registered 19 August 1978;
- Tenement (6 Bogucicka Street) – built in 1909 in the Art Nouveau style; registered 11 August 1992;
- Church of the Divine Providence (52 1 Maja Street) – built between 1930 and 1938; registry no. A/515/2019, registered 29 May 2019;
- School and kindergarten complex (2 S. Staszic Street) – a Gothic Revival building from the turn of the 19th and 20th centuries; registry no. A/526/2019, registered 30 December 1994.

The following structures in Zawodzie are protected under local zoning plans or proposed for protection based on the findings of the study of conditions and directions for spatial development of the city of Katowice:

- Buildings at 4, 4a, 5, 5a, 6, and 6a B. Czech Street;
- Industrial buildings of the former Giesche Porcelain Factory, later Porcelana Śląska: production and storage building, production and office building, former stable (23 Porcelanowa Street);
- University of Economics school buildings from the 1930s, International Style (3 Bogucicka Street; 45 and 47 1 Maja Street);
- Familoks (2, 3, 4, 5 Długa Street; 5, 7, 9, 11 G. Hałubek Street; 2, 4, 6, 8, 10, 12 Walerian Street);
- Late 19th-century kindergarten building in the historicist style (13 K. Marcinkowski Street);
- Tenements (1, 2, and 4 Bogucicka Street; 2, 3, 4, 6, 8, 11, and 13 S. Czarniecki Street; 3, 4, 5 Florian Street; 11, 13 Graniczna Street; 1 G. Hałubek Street; 1, 3 Karol Street; 3a W. Łokietek Street; 4, 5/7, 6, 8, 9, 10, 18, 22, 23, 24, 26, 26a, 28, 30, 32, 36, 38, 44, 46, 48, 49, 51, 53, 59, 61, 92, 96, 98, 102, 104, 106, 117, 130, 132 1 Maja Street; 1, 2 Nad Potokiem Street; 2, 4, 6, 8 P. Niedurny Street; 4 I. J. Paderewski Street; 1, 3, 4 Racławicka Street; 6 M. Rej Street; 27, 29 Szeroka Street; 2 S. Żółkiewski Street);
- Villas in the neoclassical style (2a, 11 1 Maja Street);
- Buildings of Ferrum SA – the management building, the construction department building, the administrative office building, and the water tower (Hutnicza Street).

The following conservation protection zones or areas proposed for protection are located in Zawodzie:

- Vicinity of 1 Maja Street – mainly a compact development of tenements along the streets, western section;
- Vicinity of 1 Maja Street – familoks, school.

=== Monuments and commemorative plaques ===
The following memorial sites are located in Zawodzie:

- Plaque commemorating those who died in 1919 and 1945 "in the fight to defend Silesia" (on the University of Economics at 50 1 Maja Street).

=== Urban planning ===
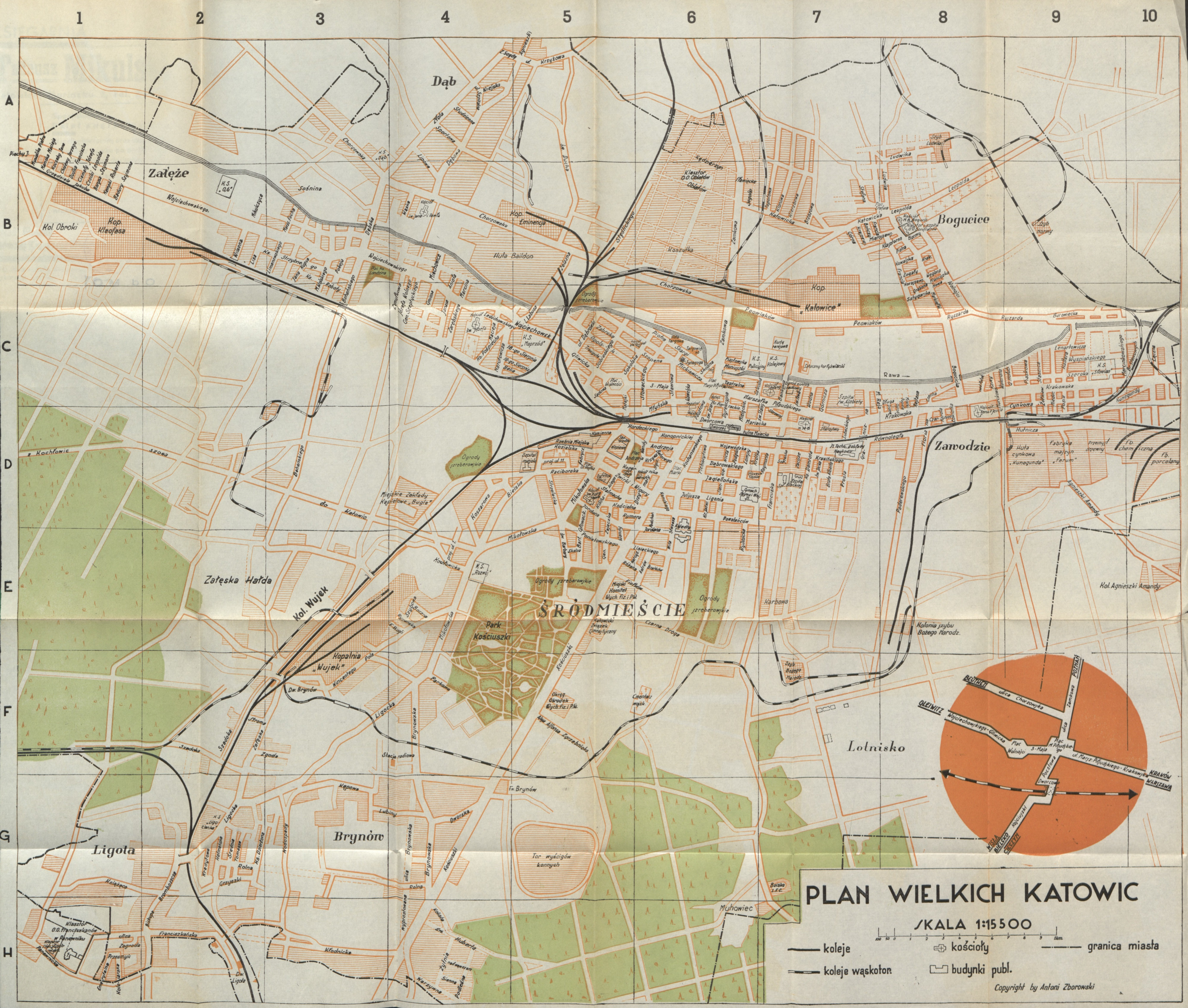
1939 Greater Katowice Plan; on the eastern side, the Zawodzie Plan

Zawodzie is characterized by multifunctional land use related to: transportation, commercial and industrial areas, retail areas, residential areas, and higher education and research functions. As part of the Study of Conditions and Directions of Spatial Planning for the City of Katowice, the Zawodzie urban area, covering 533.37 ha, was designated. In terms of actual land use as of January 2008, the largest portion of the district is occupied by industrial and service areas covering 146.4 ha, which accounts for 27.45% of Zawodzie's total area. There are also transportation areas (87.8 ha; 16.46%), forests (81.89 ha; 15.35%), and vacant building lots (62.04 ha; 11.63%). However, there are no agricultural areas in Zawodzie.

The proportion of developed area in Zawodzie in 2007 was 32%, which was higher than the average for Katowice as a whole – 23%. In some parts of the district, this ratio exceeds 50%. The net floor area ratio for Zawodzie fluctuated at 0.82 (higher than the ratio for Katowice – 0.49), while the average number of stories in 2007 was 2.56 (also higher than the citywide average of 2.13 stories).

The spatial structure of Zawodzie is fragmented by anthropogenic barriers in the form of parallel bands of railway land stretching along the axis between Szopienice, Zawodzie, and Śródmieście, as well as major thoroughfares – Walenty Roździeński Avenue and Murckowska Street. Additional barriers include strips of industrial and warehouse areas, wasteland, and forests between Zawodzie and Burowiec, as well as between Zawodzie and Janów-Nikiszowiec.

== Education ==
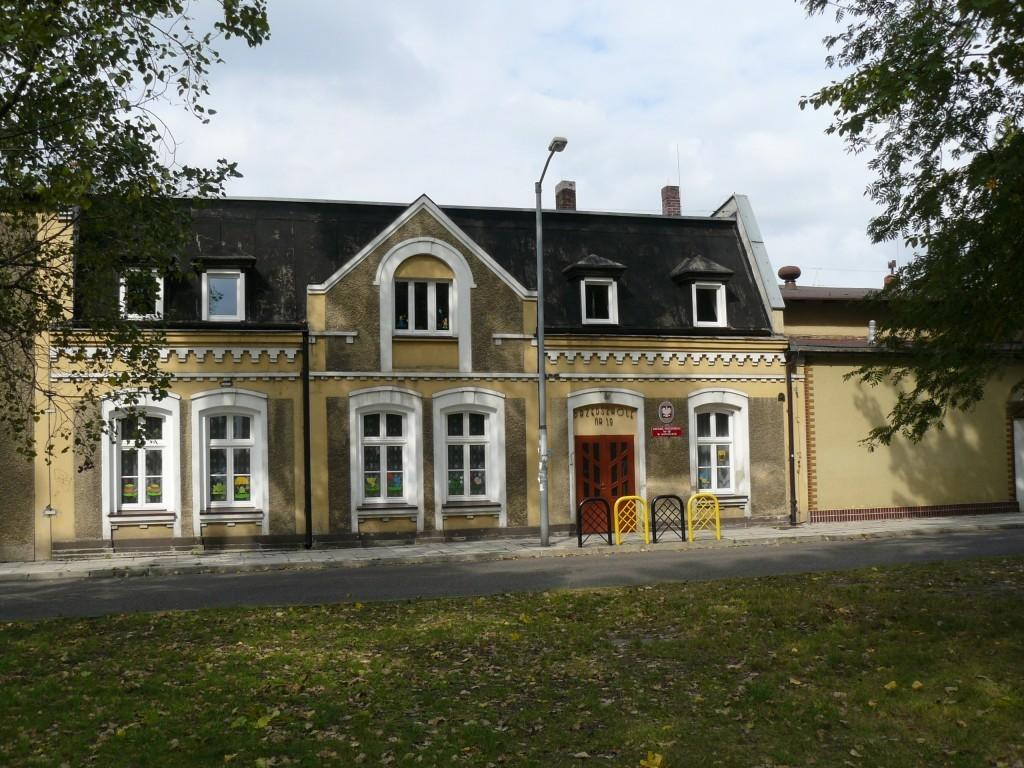
Municipal Kindergarten No. 19 in School and Kindergarten Complex No. 6 (17 K. Marcinkowski Street)

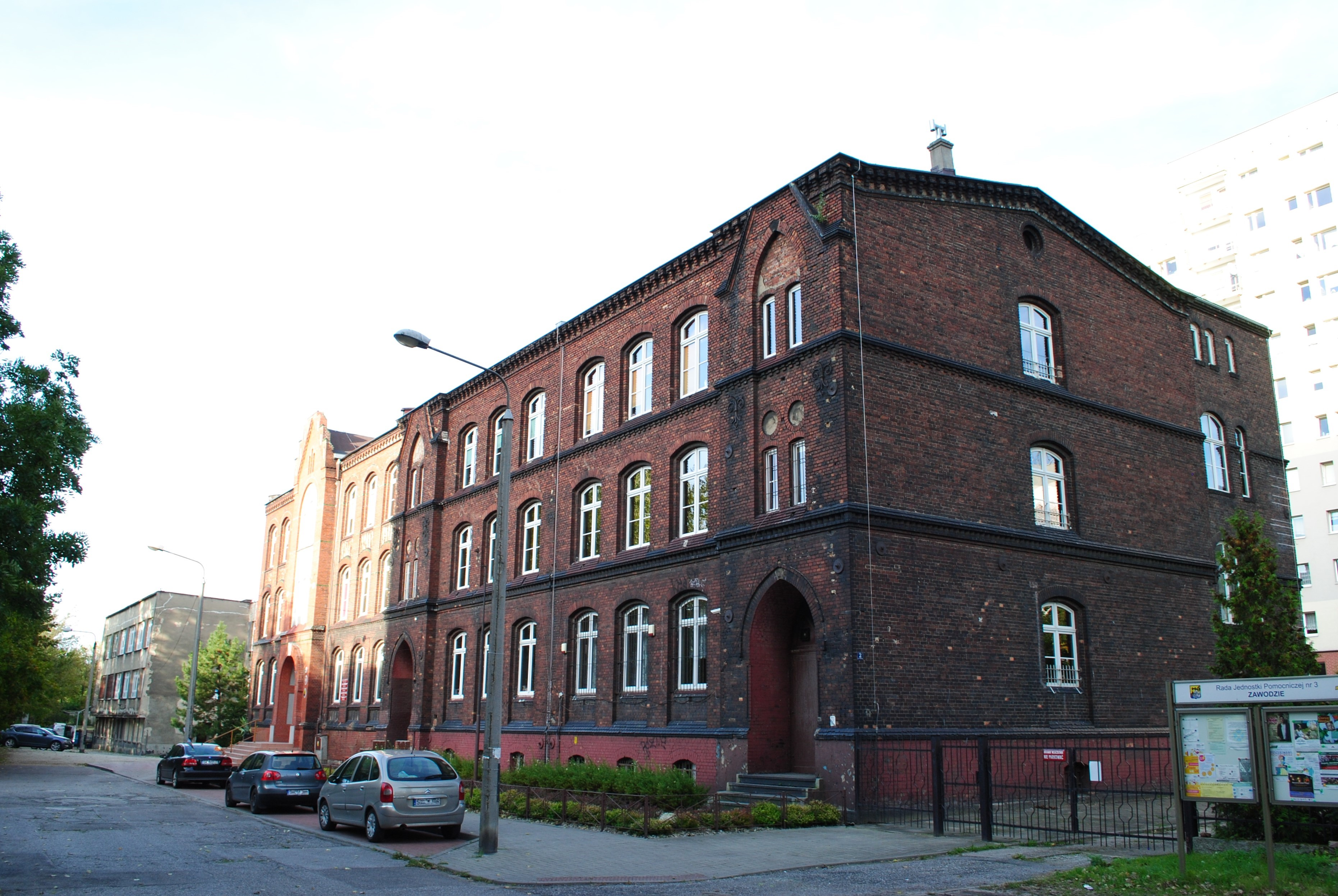
Historic buildings of J. Ziętek School Complex No. 1 (2 S. Staszic Street)

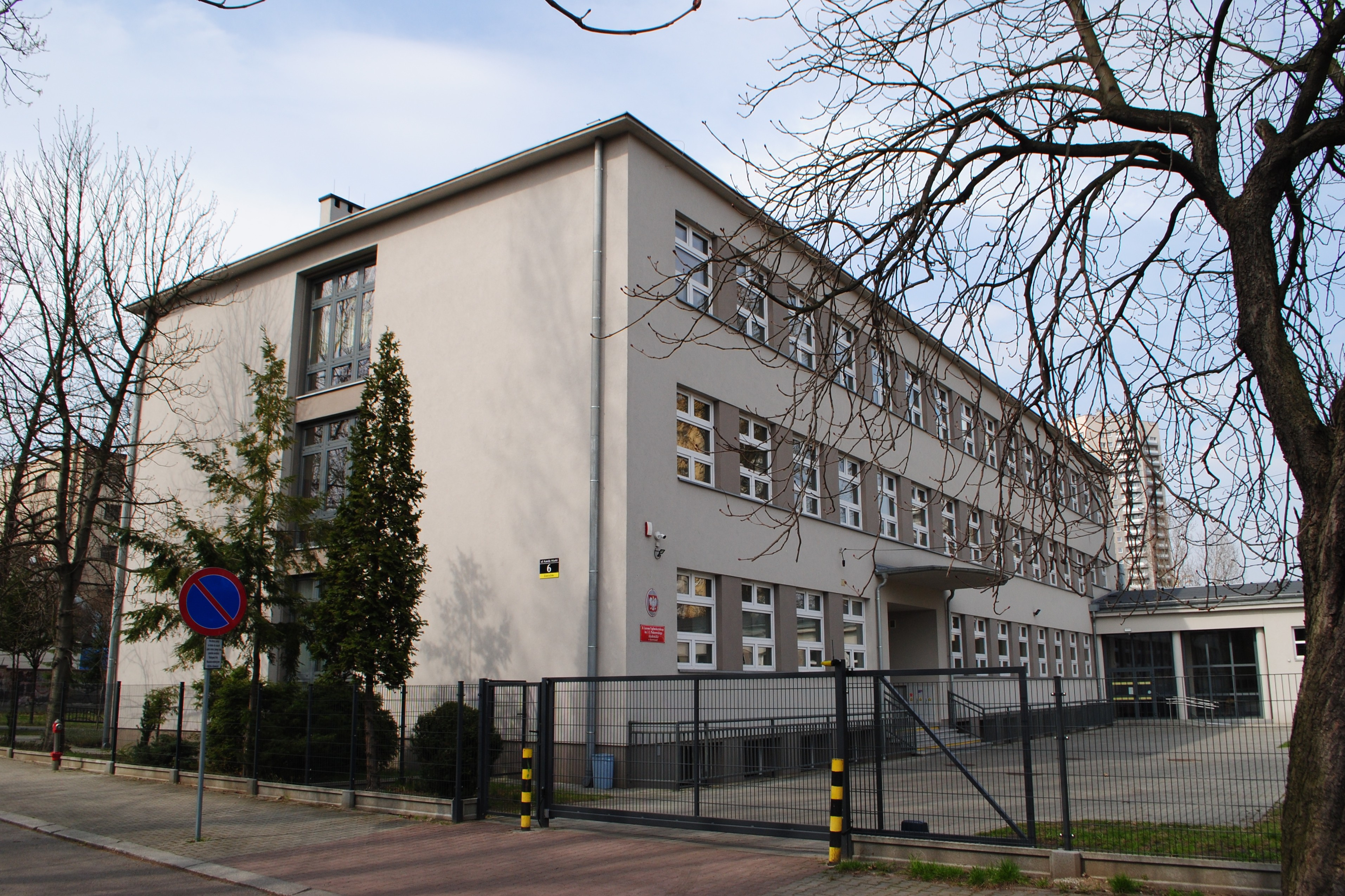
Ignacy Jan Paderewski X Academic High School (6 K. Miarka Street)

In May 2022, the following educational institutions were operating in Zawodzie:

- Nurseries:
  - Twórczy Zakątek Center for Early Childhood Education (6c K. Marcinkowski Street);
  - Municipal Nursery. Nursery Branch (13 K. Marcinkowski Street);
- Kindergartens:
  - Municipal Kindergarten No. 67 with Integration Units (88 Walenty Roździeński Avenue);
  - Municipal Kindergarten No. 74 (96 Walenty Roździeński Avenue);
  - Municipal Kindergarten No. 95 (1 Piaskowa Street);
- School complexes:
  - School and Kindergarten Complex No. 5 (82 Walenty Roździeński Avenue):
    - Municipal Kindergarten No. 6,
    - John III Sobieski Primary School No. 2,
  - School and Kindergarten Complex No. 6 (17 K. Marcinkowski Street):
    - Municipal Kindergarten No. 19,
    - Henryk Sienkiewicz Primary School No. 31,
  - J. Ziętek School Complex No. 1 (2 S. Staszic Street):
    - Vocational School Grade I No. 9,
    - Vocational School Grade I No. 10 for the Deaf and Hard of Hearing,
    - Primary School No. 16,
    - Technical School No. 20 with Special Units for the Deaf and Hard of Hearing,
    - Vocational School Grade II No. 8 with Special Units,
- High schools:
  - Ignacy Jan Paderewski X Academic High School (6 K. Miarka Street);
- Universities:
  - University of Economics (50 1 Maja Street).

The origins of education in Zawodzie date back to 1783, when the first public school was established on the premises of Weissenberg's inn, in the area of present-day 1 Maja Street. At the start of its operation, it had 170 students. The first vocational school in Zawodzie was the four-grade Craft and Industrial Supplementary School, established in 1907 and maintained by the gmina. A year later, it had 143 students. With the development of Zawodzie and the growth of its population, there arose a need to expand the old school and build a new facility. In 1908, a new building was constructed next to the existing structure, in which an Evangelical school was inaugurated, while at that time the old building housed the Katowice Girls' School. Both institutions operated until 1924, when the voivodeship authorities established the Municipal Commercial School in their place. It was the first school of its kind in Katowice, operating until the outbreak of World War II.

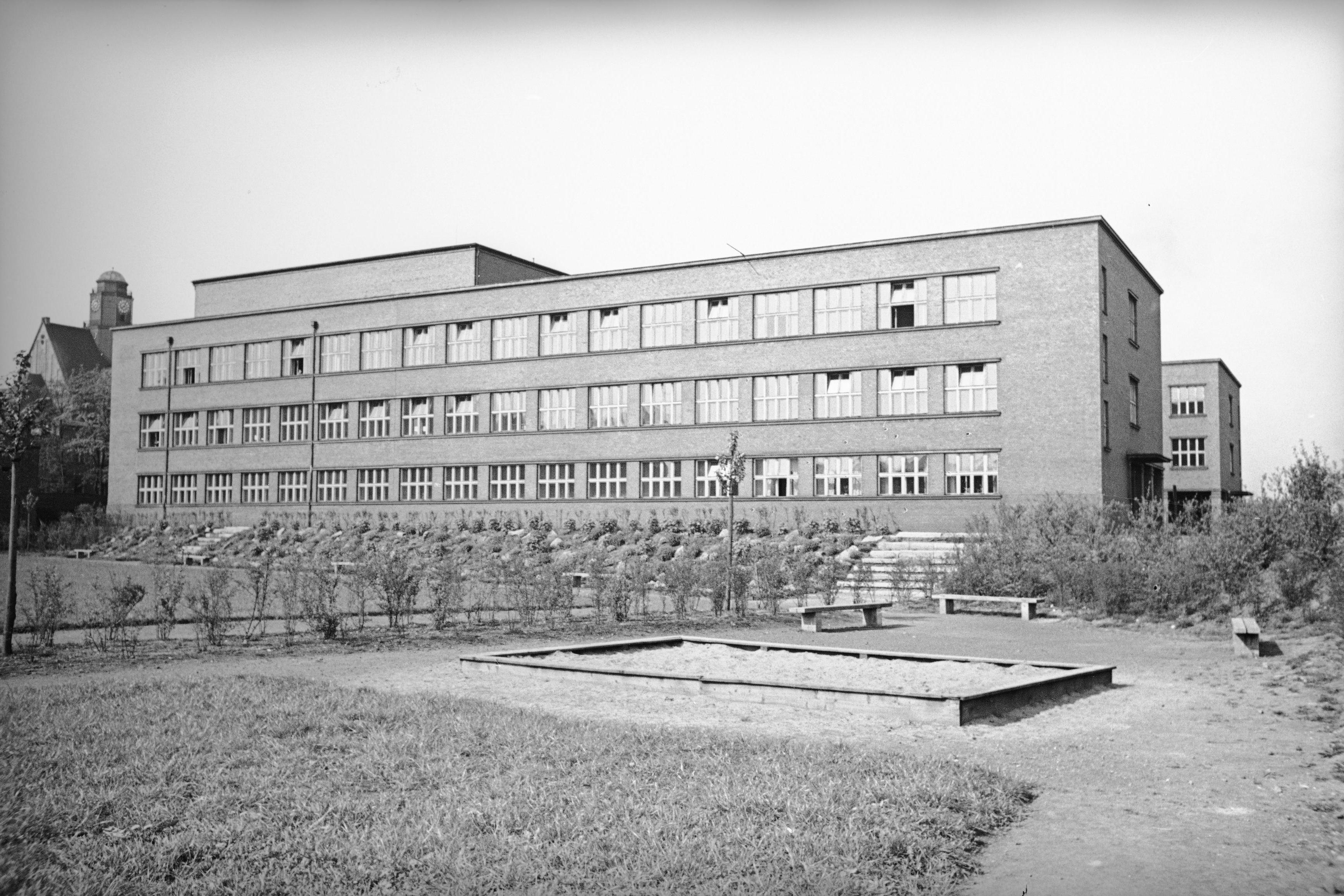
Queen Jadwiga Public School for Girls No. 14 on Bogucicka Street in 1937; on the left, a section of the Gmina Bogucice-Zawodzie town hall

In 1936, there were four elementary schools and one vocational school in Zawodzie. Two of them were housed in a building on S. Staszic Street, constructed between 1899 and 1908. These were John II Sobieski School No. 16 and Paweł Stalmach Minority School No. 17. In 1931, a new school was constructed at 4 Bogucicka Street, housing two new schools: School No. 14 for girls, named after Jadwiga of Poland, and School No. 15 for boys, named after King Władysław II Jagiełło.

After World War II, of the schools in Zawodzie that had been operating before the war, only the Municipal Commercial School did not resume operations. Schools No. 14 and 15 operated independently until 9 January 1956, and the schools at 2 S. Staszic Street were designated as Schools No. 15 and 16; they were merged in 1962 and named after the Smołek brothers.

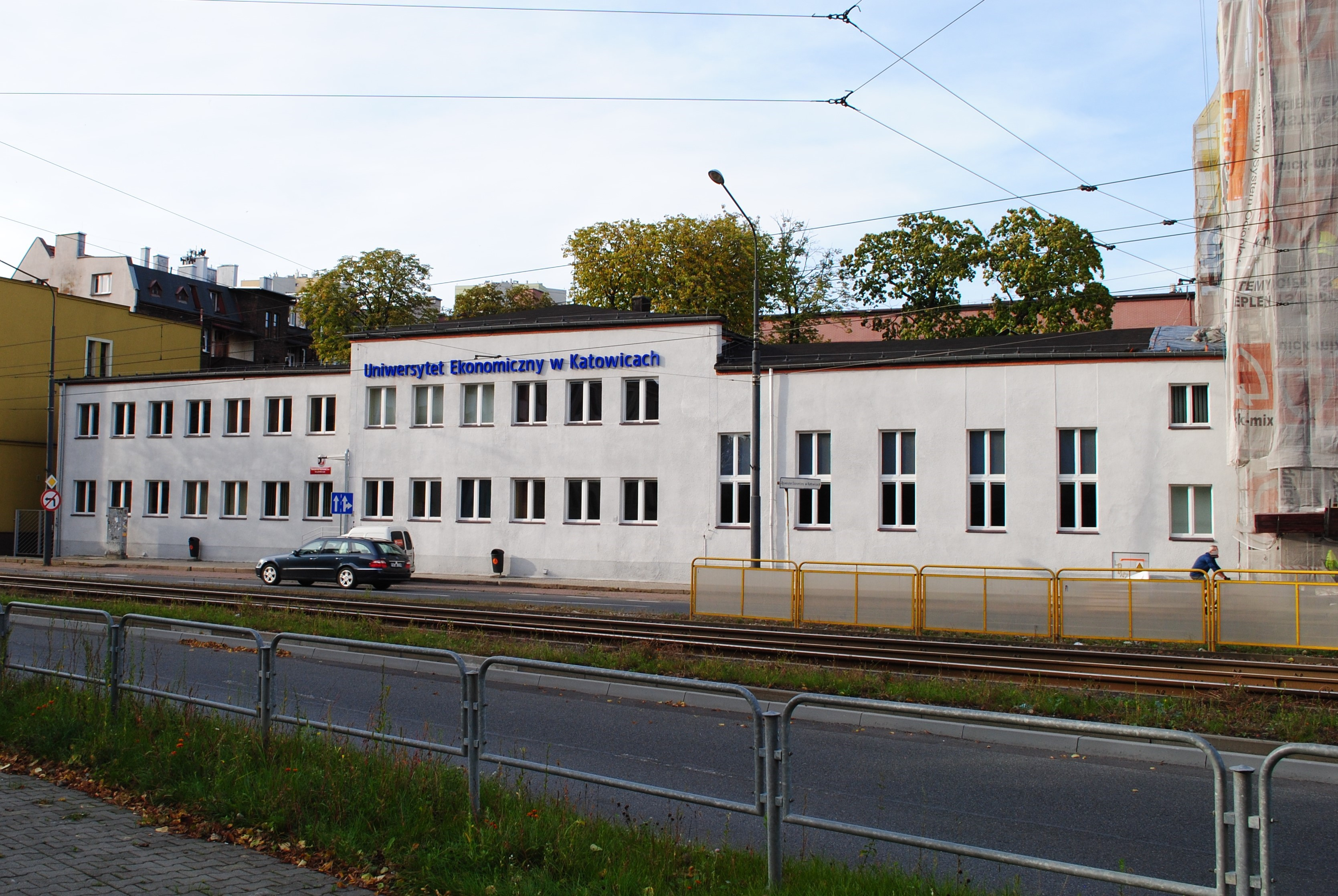
Building L of the University of Economics (45 1 Maja Street)

On 24 April 1949, the school of the Society of Friends of Children was officially opened, operating under the society's auspices until 1956. In 1967, the primary and secondary schools were separated, with the primary school moving to a different building, while the secondary school was designated as No. X. Since 1993, Ignacy Jan Paderewski has been the patron of High School No. X, and in 2019, the school gained the status of an academic high school.

In 1963, Primary School No. 31 was established. The old school housed classrooms for grades 1–5, while grades 6–8 were taught in a section of the building occupied by Primary School No. 16 on S. Staszic Street. The school's old location was at 80/81 1 Maja Street (the building was demolished in 1976), and due to the reconstruction of the transportation network in Zawodzie, the school was moved to the building at 17 K. Marcinkowski Street. In 1979, Primary School No. 2 was established in Osiedle Walentego Roździeńskiego, with John III Sobieski as its patron.

The University of Economics is headquartered in Zawodzie. On 19 February 1949, the former Higher School of Social and Economic Sciences was nationalized, and the State Higher School of Economic Administration was established. Due to the growing number of students, the Katowice authorities transferred the building of the former town hall of Gmina Bogucice-Zawodzie on 1 Maja Street and the school building on Bogucicka Street for academic use. The school began operations in its new facilities during the 1946/1947 academic year, and a campus developed around these buildings in the 1970s and 1980s. On 11 July 1950, the institution was transformed into the Higher School of Economics, in 1972, it was named after Karol Adamiecki, and in 1974, it was renamed the Academy of Economics. The school became the University of Economics by virtue of a resolution of the Council of Ministers on 1 September 2010.

== Public safety ==
In terms of the crime rate in 2007, Zawodzie was the second most dangerous district in Katowice, right after Śródmieście. In 2007, the crime rate stood at 3.53 incidents per 100 residents of the district, while the average for Katowice as a whole was 3.08 crimes. Between 2004 and 2007, this rate decreased from 6.11 in 2004. In 2013, 365 crimes were recorded in Zawodzie, which amounted to 29 incidents per 1,000 residents at the time. During this period, there were 12 robberies and 10 acts of hooliganism. The area of Zawodzie is covered by Police Station I, located in the neighboring Śródmieście district at 28 Żwirki i Wigury Street. According to a survey conducted in 2011, 41.0% of respondents from Zawodzie indicated that they felt safe in their district, while 45.8% disagreed.

In 2007, there were 31 traffic accidents in the district. The locations with the highest number of traffic collisions in Zawodzie include Walenty Roździeński Avenue and 1 Maja Street.

Fire protection in the western part of Zawodzie is provided by Rescue and Firefighting Unit No. 3 of the Katowice Municipal Headquarters of the State Fire Service, located in Śródmieście at 11 Wojewódzka Street.

At 2 B. Czech Street, Local Social Assistance Point No. 6 of the Municipal Social Assistance Center operates, covering Zawodzie, the eastern part of Bogucice, and Dąbrówka Mała. At the end of 2013, 245 families in Zawodzie were receiving assistance from the Municipal Social Welfare Center due to poverty, and the number of families receiving social assistance at that time was 393.

== Culture ==
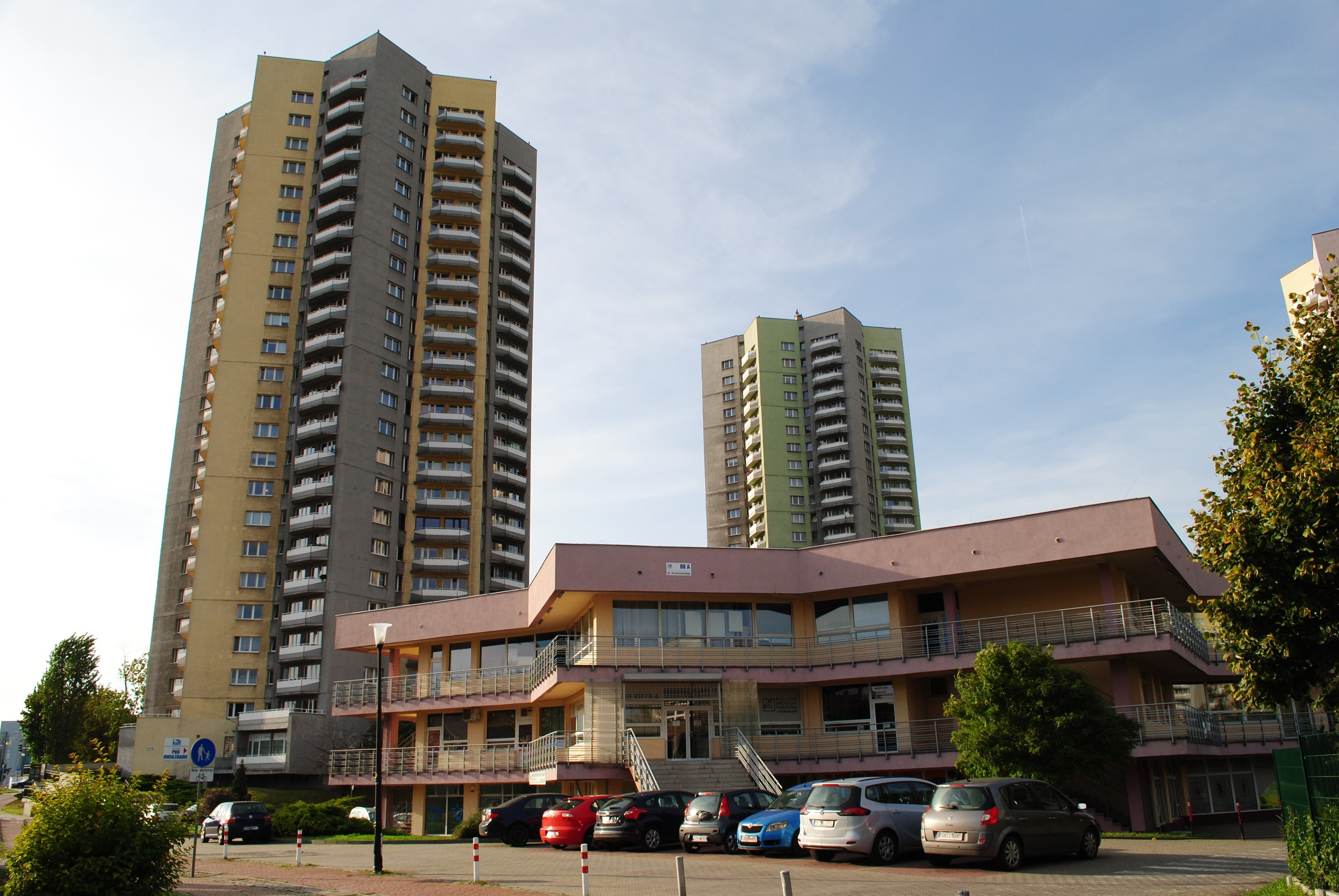
Part of Osiedle Walentego Roździeńskiego; in the foreground, Branch No. 24 of the Katowice Municipal Public Library (88a W. Roździeński Avenue)

The Atlantis Cinema was likely the first cultural institution in Zawodzie; it had been operating in a hall dating back to 1899 since 1932, located within the Besucha restaurant on present-day 1 Maja Street. The cinema later changed owners and names, and remained in operation until 1945. In the pre-war period, theatrical performances in Katowice were staged by, among others, the Gwiazda group from Zawodzie.

The oldest secular choir in present-day Katowice was likely the Lutnia Singing Society (renamed the Charity Society in 1898), founded in the second half of 1894 by young people from Bogucice, Dąbrówka Mała, and Zawodzie. Until World War I, the Singing Society choir, founded in 1909, operated in Zawodzie and remained active until 1926, while in 1919 the A. Mickiewicz Choir was established, operating until 1956. The second of these choirs, as well as the Men's Choir at Ferrum SA, active from 1934 to 1939, and the Women's Choir at the Porcelain Factory (active from 1926 to 1927), belonged to a group of large ensembles, ranging from 100 to 300 members. They were affiliated with the Silesian Singers' Association.

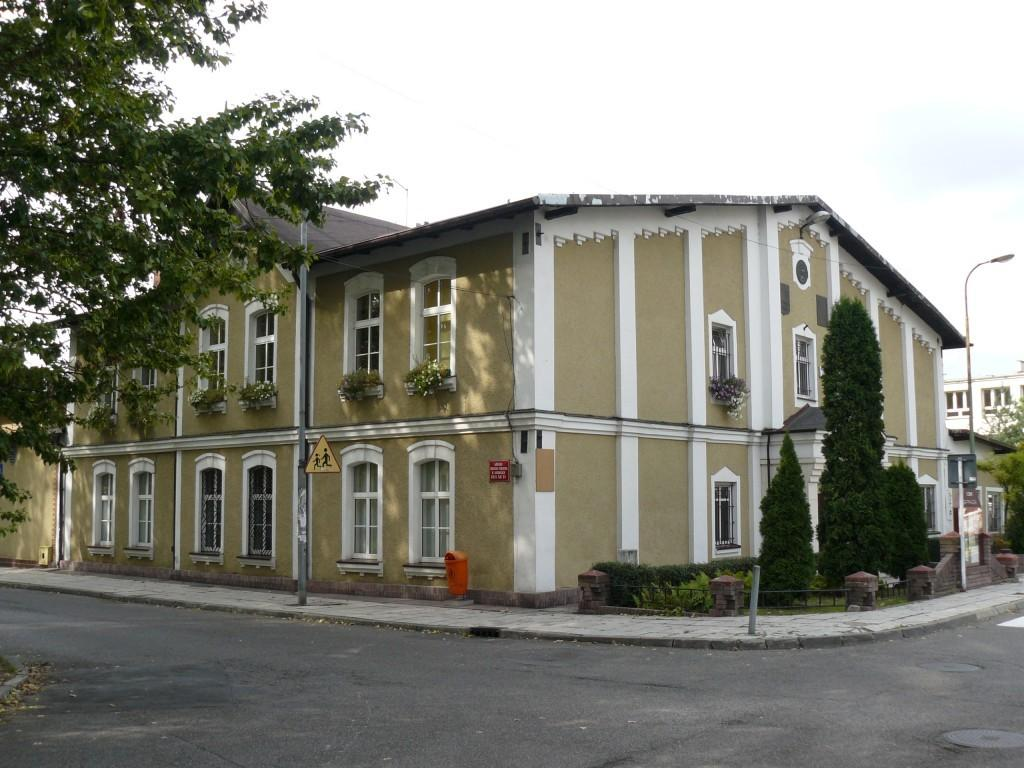
Headquarters of the Zawodzie Department of the Bogucice-Zawodzie Municipal Cultural Center, as well as Branch No. 31 of the Municipal Public Library (13 K. Marcinkowski Street)

During the interwar period, the following groups were active: the Halka and Jaskółka Mandolinists' Societies, and the Women's Choir of the Giesche Porcelain Factory. The illustrated biweekly Strzecha Rodzinna was published in Zawodzie at what was then 46 Krakowska Street (now 1 Maja Street). In 1928 (or as early as 1919), the People's Libraries Society was established in Zawodzie. Its reading room was located in the People's House. Its library branch in Zawodzie had 1,071 volumes in 1935, and at that time, 147 readers used it.

After 1945, cultural activities in Zawodzie received support in the form of state patronage. After World War II, the A. Mickiewicz Choir resumed its activities. In 1949, the choir held 93 rehearsals, 3 concerts, and 5 performances, and at that time it had 160 members. After the death of Joseph Stalin, the choir was forced to suspend its activities.

In 1945, a staff lounge for Ferrum SA and a children's daycare center began operating at 13 K. Marcinkowski Street. From 1971 to 1991, the facility functioned as a company cultural center. It hosted a variety of cultural and educational activities. In December 1991, the assets of Ferrum SA not related to production were transferred to the city of Katowice. By a resolution of the City Council on 1 January 1992, the Zawodzie Municipal Cultural Center was established, which also houses a branch of the Katowice Municipal Public Library – No. 31. The second of the Zawodzie branches – No. 24 – is located at 88a Walenty Roździeński Avenue. In 2002, a branch in Bogucice was incorporated into the Zawodzie Municipal Cultural Center, and since 2010 it has operated under the name Bogucice-Zawodzie Municipal Cultural Center. It conducts a wide range of cultural, educational, entertainment, and dining activities for children, youth, and adults. Among others, it runs sections and clubs: theater and music, as well as dance, instrument lessons, and senior groups. The Zawodzie Painting Group also operates under the Zawodzie Department of the Bogucice-Zawodzie Municipal Cultural Center. The group has about 20 members who create a variety of paintings, and each artist has their own unique painting style.

The Trzynastka Katowice Housing Cooperative Club is also located at 13 Racławicka Street. Its name was chosen by children and is derived from the club's address. It has been operating at the Katowice Housing Cooperative since 1980. Today, the club conducts a wide range of cultural, educational, and developmental activities for all age groups. The main activities include sports sections and the Senior Club. The Arkada Student Club also operated at the University of Economics. It was founded in October 1994. The club organized a series of cultural and entertainment events, including concerts, sung poetry evenings, exhibitions, and charity events.

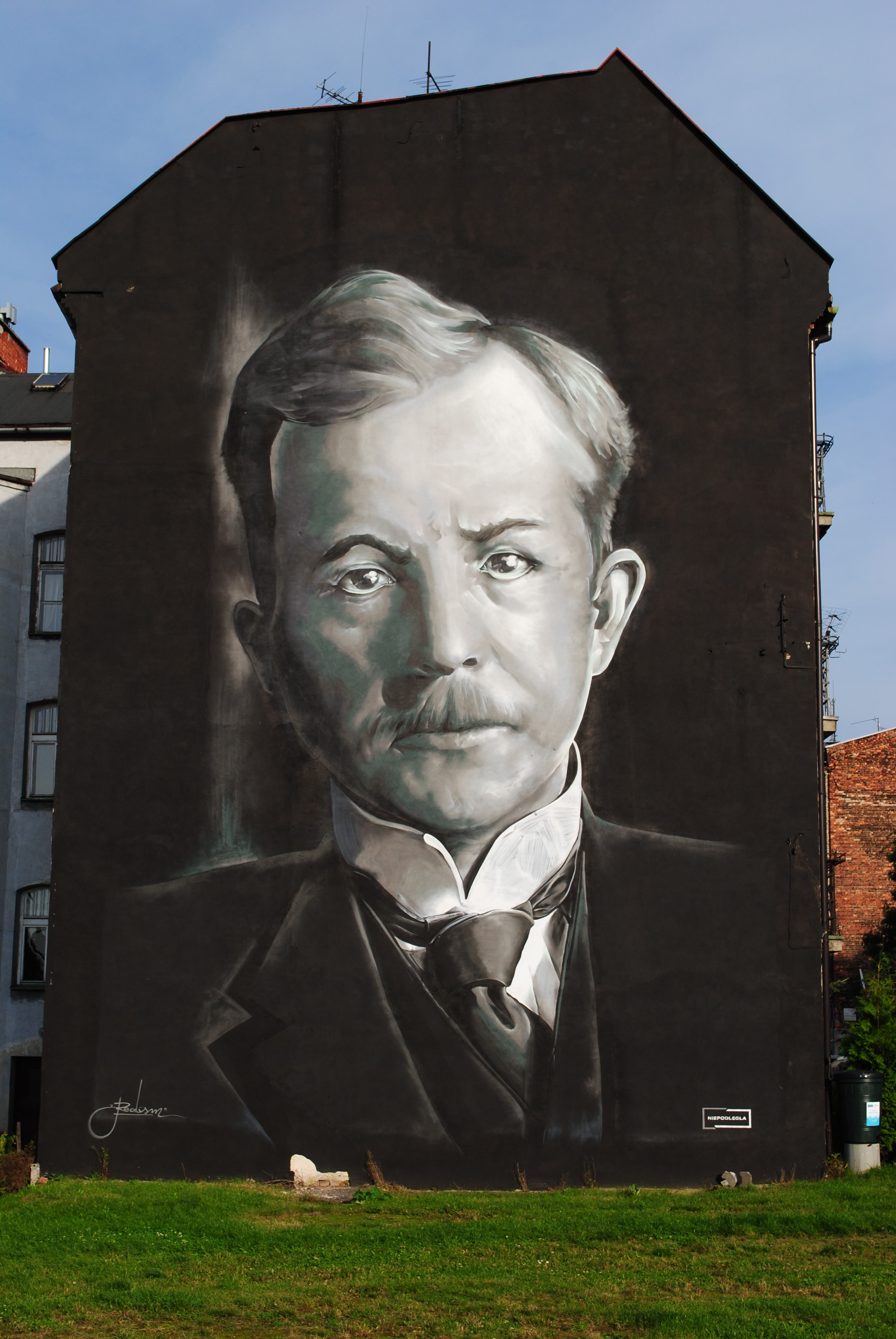
Wall of the tenement at 6 M. Rej Street with a mural depicting Wojciech Korfanty

In November 2020, city authorities launched a project to create a trail of Katowice murals, most of which were created as part of various editions of the Katowice Street Art Festival. As of mid-May 2022, the following murals are located within the boundaries of Zawodzie:

- Underpass beneath Walenty Roździeński Avenue on the border of Zawodzie and Bogucice – a mural depicting Jerzy Kukuczka, part of the Secret Garden project. It was created in 2011 on commission from Katowice City of Gardens, with Jerzy Rojkowski as the artist;
- 3 S. Czarniecki Street – a mural created by Paweł Ryszko as part of the Plac na Glanc project in 2015;
- 13 Graniczna Street – a mural depicting Jan Furtok, a footballer of GKS Katowice. It was created in 2021 at the initiative of the SK 1964 GKS Katowice Supporters' Association;
- 7 1 Maja Street – a mural depicting an airship flying toward the Valley of Three Ponds and a waterfall directing water onto 1 Maja Street. It was created in 2015 by the Warsaw-based Good Looking agency;
- 53 1 Maja Street – a mural referencing the annual e-sports competition Intel Extreme Masters, held in Katowice. The artist is Mona Tusz, and the mural was created in 2021;
- 87 1 Maja Street – a mural by Julian Jakub Ziółkowski from 2012;
- 154 1 Maja Street – a mural from 2021 by Paweł Ryżko and Karol Kobryń, created in 2021 as part of the "Zawodzie jest w modzie" project, selected for implementation under Katowice's participatory budget;
- 13 K. Marcinkowski Street – one of the community murals created in 2021 by Katowice residents under the guidance of Małgorzata Norek;
- 23b Porcelanowa Street – two murals from 2018. The one on the left, by Artur Wabik, references historical porcelain figurine designs depicting cats. The one on the right is the work of Milo Banachowicz and Miłosz Konieczko and has geometric patterns;
- 6 M. Rej Street – a mural depicting Wojciech Korfanty, created in 2018 by Wojciech Walczyk to mark the 100th anniversary of his speech in the Reichstag.

== Religion ==
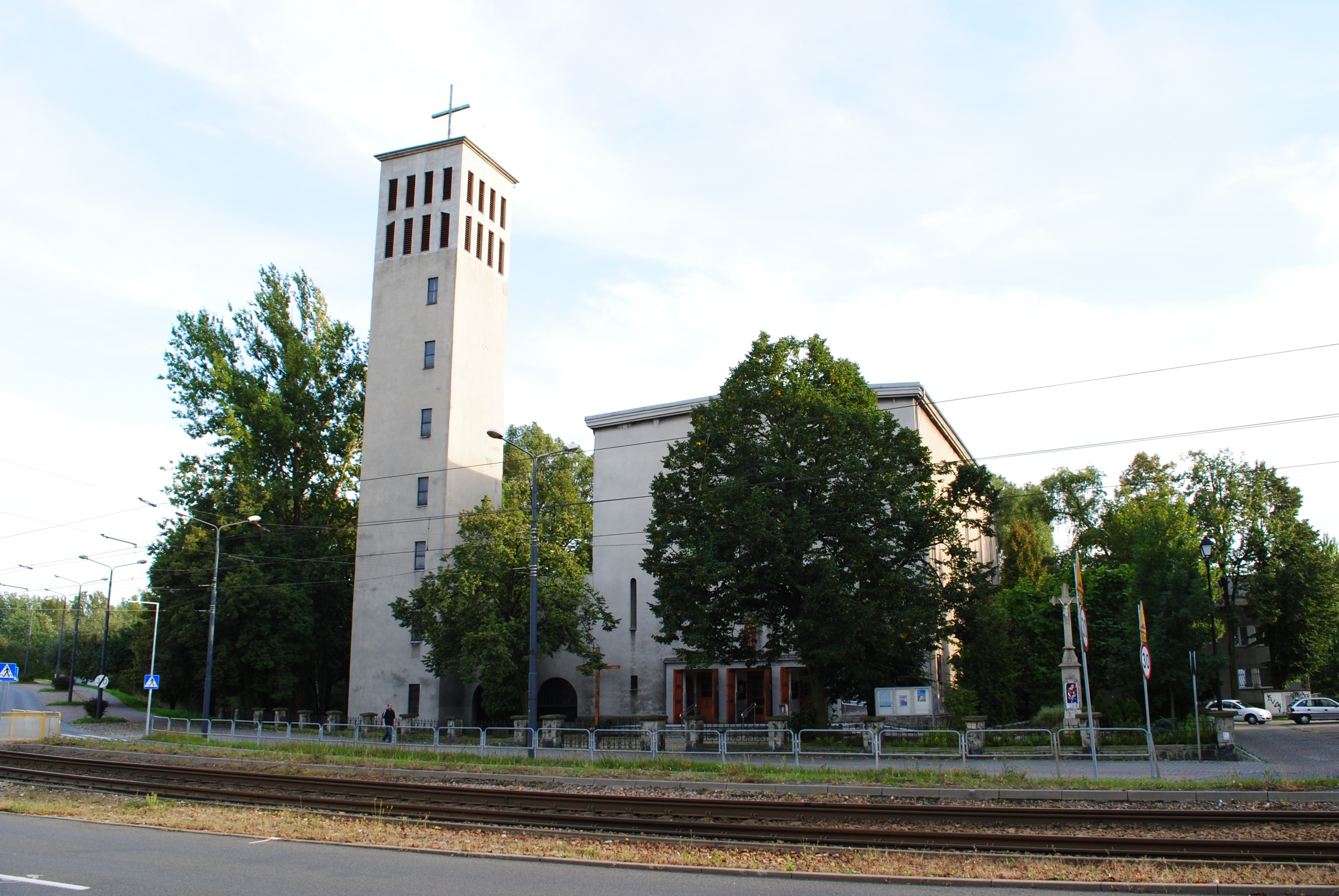
Church of the Parish of the Divine Providence (1 Maja Street)

The Roman Catholic Church is the largest religious community in Zawodzie. The Parish of the Divine Providence, located at 52 1 Maja Street, operates in the district. It covers Zawodzie along with part of Osiedle Walentego Roździeńskiego. The parish in Zawodzie belongs to the Katowice-Śródmieście deanery of the Archdiocese of Katowice. Numerous pastoral groups operate within the parish, including ministries for various professions. In 2019, 70 baptisms, 10 weddings, and 159 funerals were held at the church in Zawodzie. On average, 1,700 faithful attended Sunday Mass each week.

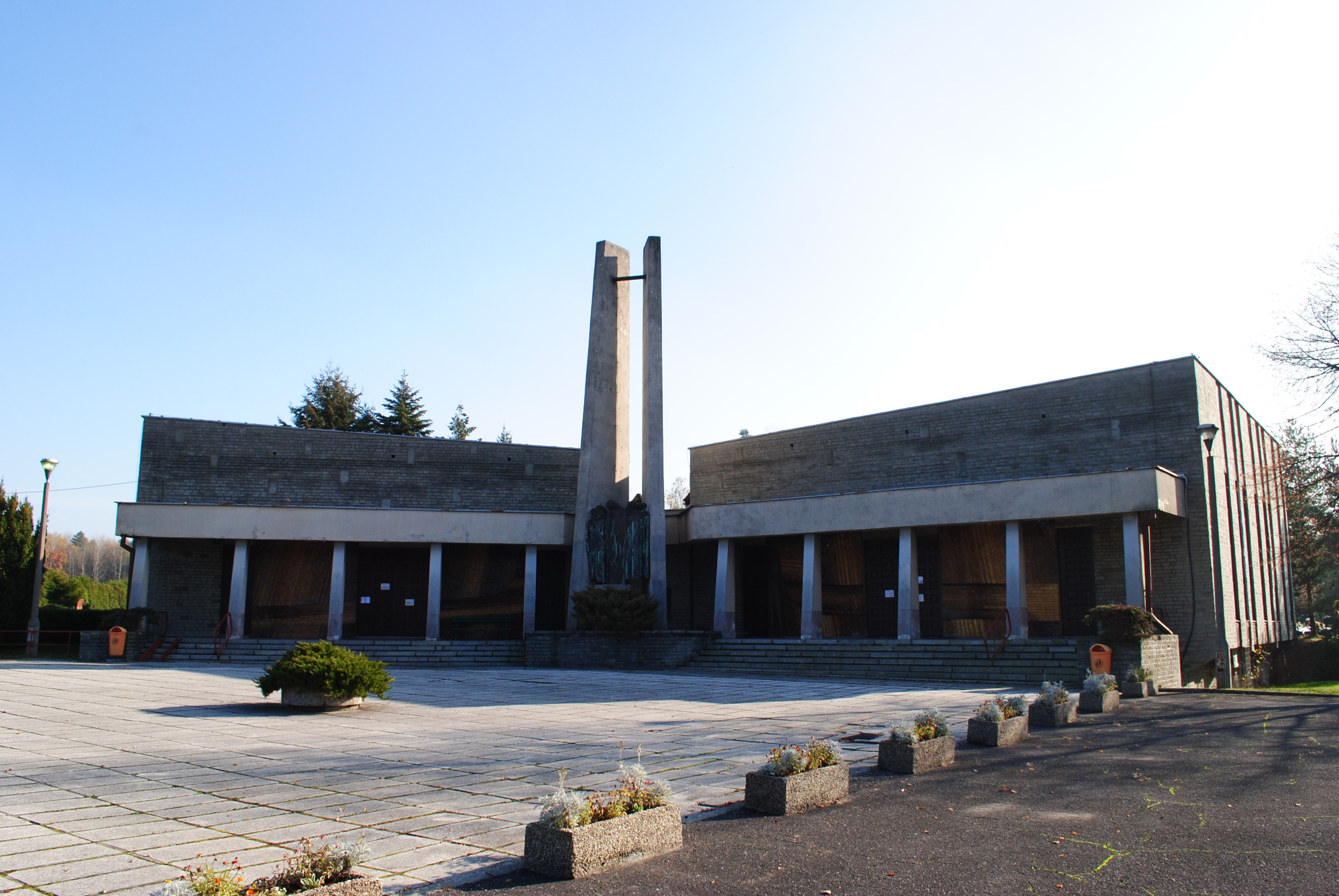
Building on the grounds of the Katowice Central Municipal Cemetery

Originally, Roman Catholic parishioners from Zawodzie belonged to the Bogucice parish, the oldest in Katowice. Father Antoni Lindner was assigned to establish the Zawodzie parish and build the church. The chaplaincy covering the faithful in Zawodzie was separated from the Bogucice parish on 1 January 1927. The new chaplaincy covered the area south of Rawa and east of Graniczna Street, including the faithful from the Amanda and Zuzanna colonies. A temporary church for the faithful of the new parish was established in 1930 in Jan Prosz's dance hall, known as "u Szwedy", in a building that no longer exists at 2 Murckowska Street. It served as a place of worship for 18 months. The Church of the Divine Providence was built between 1930 and 1931. In August 1931, finishing work was underway, and the altar was moved from the Bogucice cemetery chapel to Zawodzie. In August 1948, construction of the chancel began, and on 20 December 1957, the chaplaincy was elevated to the status of a parish.

In the early postwar years, Zawodzie was also home to at least 450 Greek Catholic parishioners and several Orthodox parishioners.

=== Cemeteries ===
The Katowice Central Municipal Cemetery, largest in Katowice in terms of area, is located on Murckowska Street. It covers an area of 30.5 hectares and has a section for unidentified individuals, a funeral home, a morgue, and a mortuary. The cemetery is maintained by the Parish of the Divine Providence.

== Sport and recreation ==
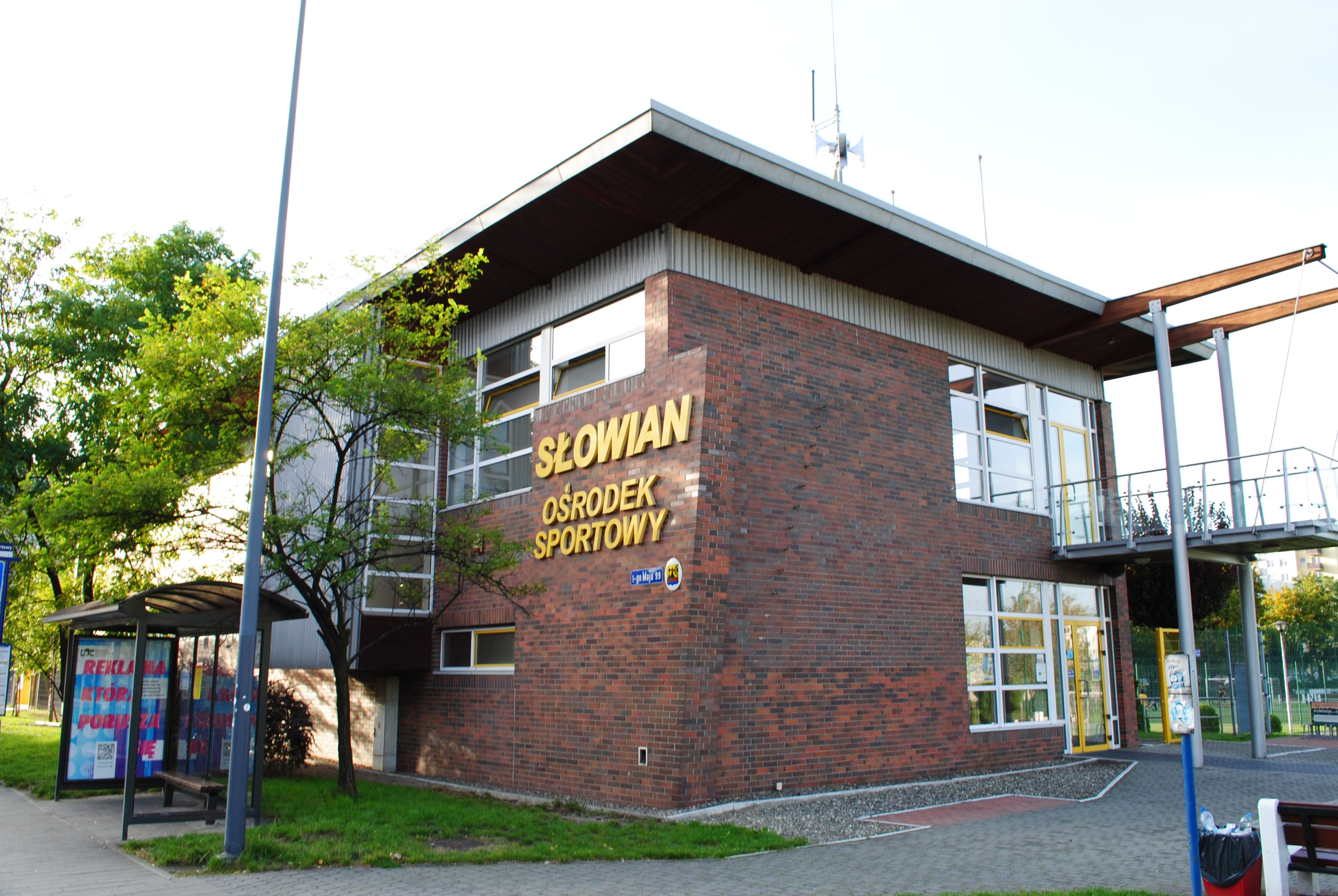
Słowian Sports Center Complex (99 1 Maja Street)

The first sports facility in Zawodzie, and the second within the present-day boundaries of Katowice, was a shooting range. It was built in 1878 at the current address of 45 1 Maja Street and was maintained first by Gmina Bogucice, and later by the city of Katowice. Originally, it was used by the German Shooting Guild, and from 1926 to 1928 by the Shooting Brotherhood. After reconstruction, the building became the People's House in Katowice-Zawodzie, and numerous organizations had their headquarters there.

Sports and recreational organizations developed especially quickly in the 1920s and 1930s. During this time, the following sports clubs were active: Siła, Słowian, Powstaniec, the Strzała Cyclists' Society, and the Silesia hockey club. 13 sports organizations were active between 1922 and 1939.

The Słowian Sports Club was founded in 1924 by employees of Ferrum SA. It initially had only a soccer team, which began competing in the Class C championship in 1926. In 1931, the first team was promoted to the Silesian League. In 1939, the club merged with Pogoń Katowice. The Powstaniec Sports Club was founded in 1926 and focused on combat sports: boxing, wrestling, and weightlifting. The greatest successes were achieved by two Powstaniec weightlifters: Karol Rychlik and Józef Szwarc, who won the Polish Championship in their discipline. In 1929, the club merged with the Sokół II Gymnastics Society.

After World War II, between 1945 and 1949, there were five sports clubs in Zawodzie that played soccer: Atom Chemical Factory (founded at the Giesche Chemical Factory on 30 September 1946; it merged with Naprzód Szopienice in August 1948), Ferrum 1945, the Sports Club of the Kunegunda steelworks, Katowiczanka (a club founded in 1946; on 15 July 1949, it merged with Siła Giszowiec and Naprzód Janów), and Silesia Giesche Porcelain Factory Giesche.

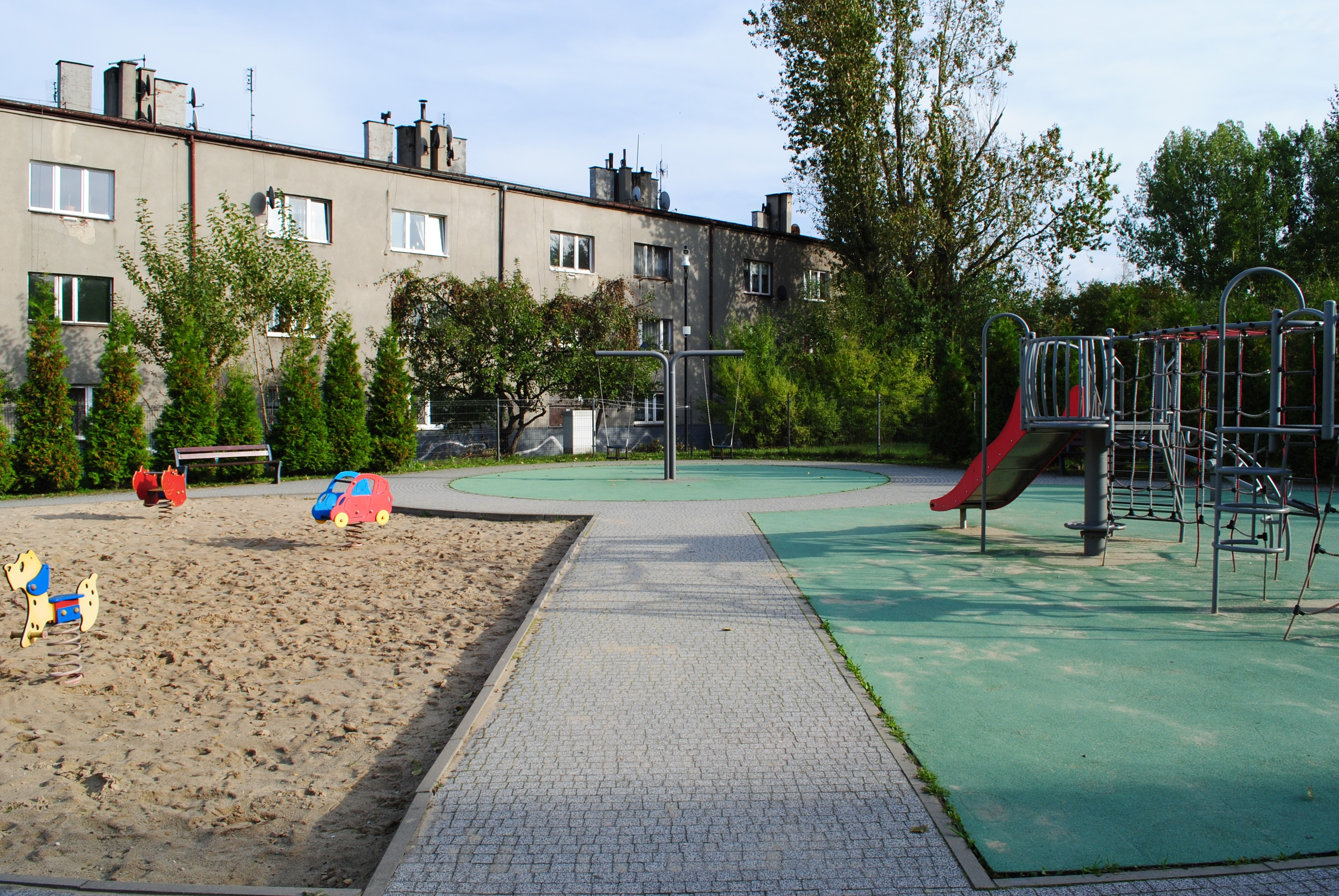
Playground in the area of Cynkowa and 1 Maja streets

In the postwar period, the Academic Sports Association Sports Club, which had been headquartered in the former town hall since 1 June 1946, played a pioneering role in the development of collegiate sports. At the time, it was the only multi-sport club in Zawodzie, which established sections for handball, soccer, athletics, boxing, fencing, skiing, water sports, tennis, and a motor sports section. In 1948, the Academic Sports Union handball team was promoted to the First League, and from 1962 to 1966, the women's team of Słowian Katowice competed in the First League. In 1970, the AZS Environmental Board club was founded, bringing together the academic sports community of Katowice, including the K. Adamiecki University of Economics; the new club was headquartered on Mikołowska Street. The university club in Zawodzie was reactivated in 1982.

In 2002, the Słowian Sports Center was built on the site of the former Słowian Katowice facility; it is administered by the Katowice Municipal Sports and Recreation Center. The facility includes a soccer training field, multi-purpose tartan tracks, and two tennis courts. In 2007, there were four sports clubs operating in Zawodzie.

The following sports and recreation facilities are located in the district:

- Słowian Sports Center (99 1 Maja Street);
- Tennis courts (99 1 Maja Street);
- University of Economics swimming pool (50 1 Maja Street).

== Bibliography ==
- Barciak, Antoni; Chojecka, Ewa; Fertacz, Sylwester, eds. (2012). Katowice. Środowisko, dzieje, kultura, język i społeczeństwo [Katowice. Environment, History, Culture, Language, and Society] (in Polish). Vol. 1–2. Katowice: Museum of History of Katowice. ISBN 978-83-87727-24-6.
- Bartoszek, Adam; Czekaj, Krzysztof; Trawkowska, Dobroniega, eds. (2012). Diagnoza problemów społecznych i monitoring polityki społecznej dla aktywizacji zasobów ludzkich w Katowicach [Diagnosis of Social Problems and Monitoring of Social Policy for Human Resource Activation in Katowice] (in Polish). Katowice: University of Silesia. ISBN 978-83-61061-97-7.
- Breitkopf, Eugeniusz; Skorwider, Eugeniusz; Steuer, Antoni (2011). Zawodzie: monografia dzielnicy i parafii Opatrzności Bożej w Katowicach [Zawodzie: A Monograph of the District and the Parish of the Divine Providence in Katowice] (in Polish). Katowice: Prasa i Książka. ISBN 978-83-929961-8-7.
- Bulsa, Michał (2018). Ulice i place Katowic [Streets and Squares of Katowice] (in Polish) (third ed.). Katowice: Prasa i Książka. ISBN 978-83-63780-28-9.
- Bulsa, Michał; Szmatloch, Barbara (2019). Katowice, których nie ma [Katowice That Is No More] (in Polish). Łódź: Księży Młyn. ISBN 978-83-7729-502-1.
- Drobek, Daria; Michalska, Ewa; Radecki, Ryszard; Perdyła, Magdalena (January 2014). Opracowanie ekofizjograficzne podstawowe z elementami opracowania ekofizjograficznego problemowego (problematyka ochrony dolin rzecznych oraz ograniczeń dla zagospodarowania terenu wynikających z wpływu działalności górniczej) dla potrzeb opracowania projektów miejscowych planów zagospodarowania przestrzennego obszarów położonych w mieście Katowice [Basic Ecophysiographic Study with Elements of a Problem-Oriented Ecophysiographic Study (Issues of River Valley Protection and Constraints on Land Development Resulting from the Impact of Mining Activity) for the Purposes of Preparing Draft Local Spatial Development Plans for Areas Located within the City of Katowice] (in Polish). Katowice: Werona.
- Drobniak, Adam; Polko, Adam; Plac, Klaudia, eds. (2014). Diagnoza sytuacji społeczno-ekonomicznej Miasta Katowice wraz z wyznaczeniem obszarów rewitalizacji i analizą strategiczną [Diagnosis of the Socio-Economic Situation of the City of Katowice, Including the Identification of Revitalisation Areas and Strategic Analysis] (PDF) (in Polish). Katowice: City of Katowice. ISBN 978-83-61061-97-7.
- Dulias, Renata; Hibszer, Adam, eds. (2008). Górnośląski Związek Metropolitalny. Zarys geograficzny [Metropolitan Association of Upper Silesia. Geographical Outline] (in Polish). Sosnowiec: Polish Geographical Society. ISBN 978-83-61695-00-4.
- Steuer, Antoni (2022). "Leksykon bogucki" [Bogucice Lexicon]. mhk.katowice.pl (in Polish). Archived from the original on 15 May 2021.
- Szaraniec, Lech (1996). Osady i osiedla Katowic [Settlements and Housing Estates of Katowice] (in Polish). Katowice: Artur. ISBN 83-905115-0-9.
- Zemła, Marek, ed. (25 April 2012). Studium uwarunkowań i kierunków zagospodarowania przestrzennego miasta Katowice – II edycja. Część 1. Uwarunkowania zagospodarowania przestrzennego [Study of the Conditions and Directions of Spatial Development of the City of Katowice – Second Edition. Part One. Conditions of Spatial Development] (PDF) (in Polish). Katowice: Biuro Rozwoju Regionu.
