= Alojzy Orszulik =

Polish Roman Catholic bishop (1928–2019)

Alojzy Orszulik S.A.C.
- Bishop of Łowicz
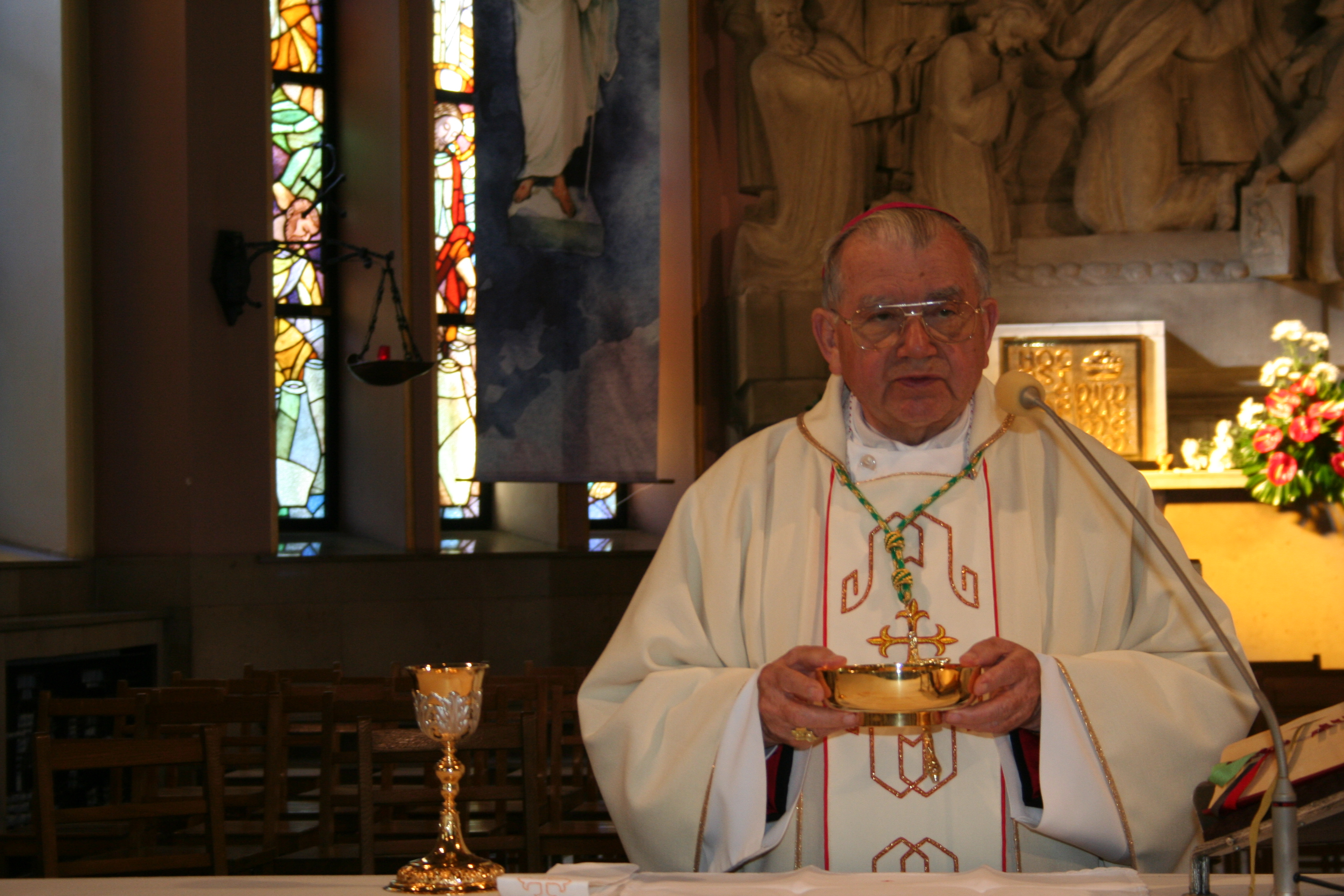
- Church: Catholic Church
- In office: 1992–2004
- Successor: Andrzej Dziuba
- Previous posts: Auxiliary Bishop of Siedlce, (1989–1992); Titular Bishop of Vissalsa, (1989–1992)

Orders
- Ordination: June 22, 1957
- Consecration: December 8, 1989 by Józef Glemp

Personal details
- Born: June 21, 1928 Baranowice, Silesian Voivodeship, Poland
- Died: February 21, 2019 (aged 90) Łowicz, Poland
- Denomination: Catholicism
- Motto: Christo in aliis servire

Alojzy Orszulik S.A.C. (21 June 1928 – 21 February 2019) was a Polish Roman Catholic bishop.

== Early life ==
Orszulik was born in Poland and was ordained to the priesthood in 1957. He served as titular bishop of Vissalsa and as auxiliary bishop of the Roman Catholic Diocese of Siedlce, Poland, from 1989 to 1992. He then served as bishop of the Roman Catholic Diocese of Łowicz, Poland, from 1992 to 2004.

== See also ==
· · ·
