= Diocese of Łowicz =

Roman Catholic diocese in Poland

Coordinates: 52°06′25″N 19°56′33″E

Diocese of Łowicz Dioecesis Lovicensis Diecezja łowicka

Catholic
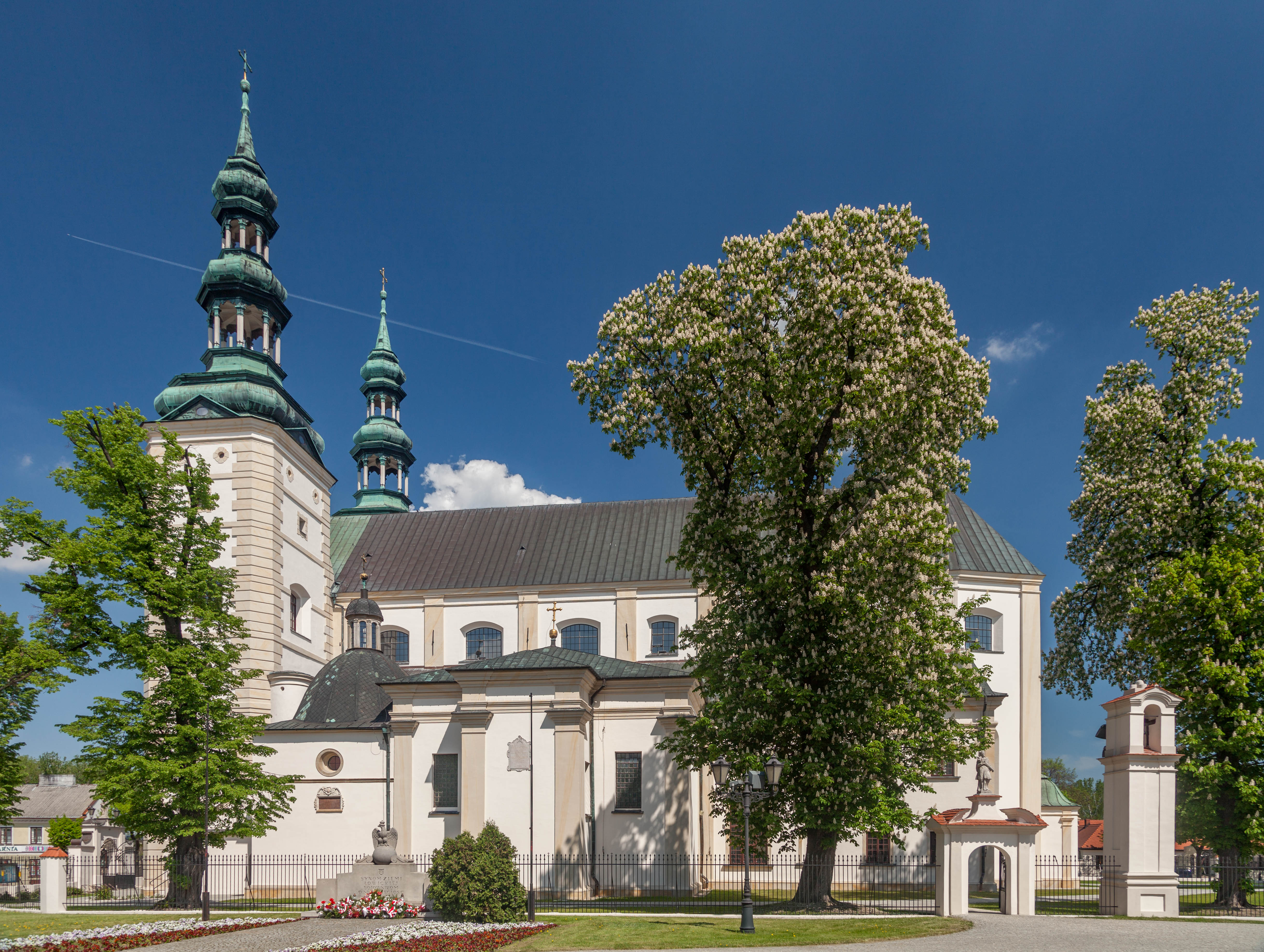
- Cathedral of the Assumption in Łowicz

Location
- Country: Poland
- Ecclesiastical province: Łódż
- Metropolitan: Archdiocese of Łódż

Statistics
- Area: 5,806 km^{2} (2,242 sq mi)
- Population: Total; Catholics: (as of 2019); 602,730; 583,496 (96,8%)

Information
- Denomination: Catholic Church
- Rite: Latin Rite
- Cathedral: Katedra pw. Wniebowzięcia Najświętszej Marii Panny (Cathedral of the Assumption of the Blessed Virgin Mary)

Current leadership
- Pope: Leo XIV
- Bishop: Wojciech Osial
- Metropolitan Archbishop: Grzegorz Ryś
- Bishops emeritus: Andrzej Dziuba

Map

Website
- Website of the Diocese

The Diocese of Łowicz (Latin: Dioecesis Lovicensis) is a Latin diocese of the Catholic Church located in the city of Łowicz in the ecclesiastical province of Łódż in Poland.

Its cathedral, the Cathedral Basilica of the Assumption of the Blessed Virgin Mary and St. Nicholas, stands as one of Poland's official national Historic Monuments (Pomnik historii), as designated November 13, 2012. This listing is maintained by the National Heritage Board of Poland.

In 2014, it became the first and for now the only one Polish diocese since a very long time where no deacon was ordinated a priest. About 31.3% of all Catholics in the diocese attend Sunday mass, which is lower than the average for the Polish nation as of 2013.

== History ==
- March 25, 1992: Established as Diocese of Łowicz from the Diocese of Łódź, Diocese of Płock and Metropolitan Archdiocese of Warszawa

== Leadership ==
Bishops of Łowicz

- Alojzy Orszulik, S.A.C. (25 March 1992 – 27 March 2004)
- Andrzej Dziuba (27 March 2004 – 9 March 2024)
- Wojciech Osial (12 September 2024 – present)

== Reports of sex abuse ==
In the summer of 2020, Piotr M., a priest of the diocese, was convicted of sexually molesting two girls in the village of Ruszów. Investigations revealed that there had been allegations of abuse against him from 10 accusers dating back more than 30 years while he served in the Archdiocese of Wroclaw. A spokesman for the Diocese of Łowicz said that since his conviction Piotr M. has been barred from celebrating Mass or presenting himself as a priest.

In 2024, the Nunciature to Poland said that Bishop Andrzej Dziuba was told to resign because of management issues, "in particular negligence in handling sexual abuse cases committed by some clergy against minors". He had failed to report a case of such abuse to local authorities.

== See also ==
- Roman Catholicism in Poland
