= Szonert =

Szonert is a surname. Notable people with the surname include:

- Eliza Szonert, Australian actress
- Mirosław Szonert, Polish film and television actor
