= Ferrum =

Ferrum can refer to:

- Iron, for which ferrum is the Latin term and the source of its chemical symbol Fe.
- Ferrum, Virginia
- Ferrum College, in Ferrum, Virginia
- Ferrum 49, Polish locomotive class
- Ferrum SA, a Polish steel pipe producer established in 1874.

== See also ==
- Fer, French wine grape named after Ferrum
