= Łowicz Cathedral =

Coordinates: 52.1078°N 19.9433°E

Cathedral Basilica of the Assumption of the Blessed Virgin Mary and St. Nicholas
- Bazylika katedralna Wniebowzięcia Najświętszej Maryi Panny i św. Mikołaja w Łowiczu
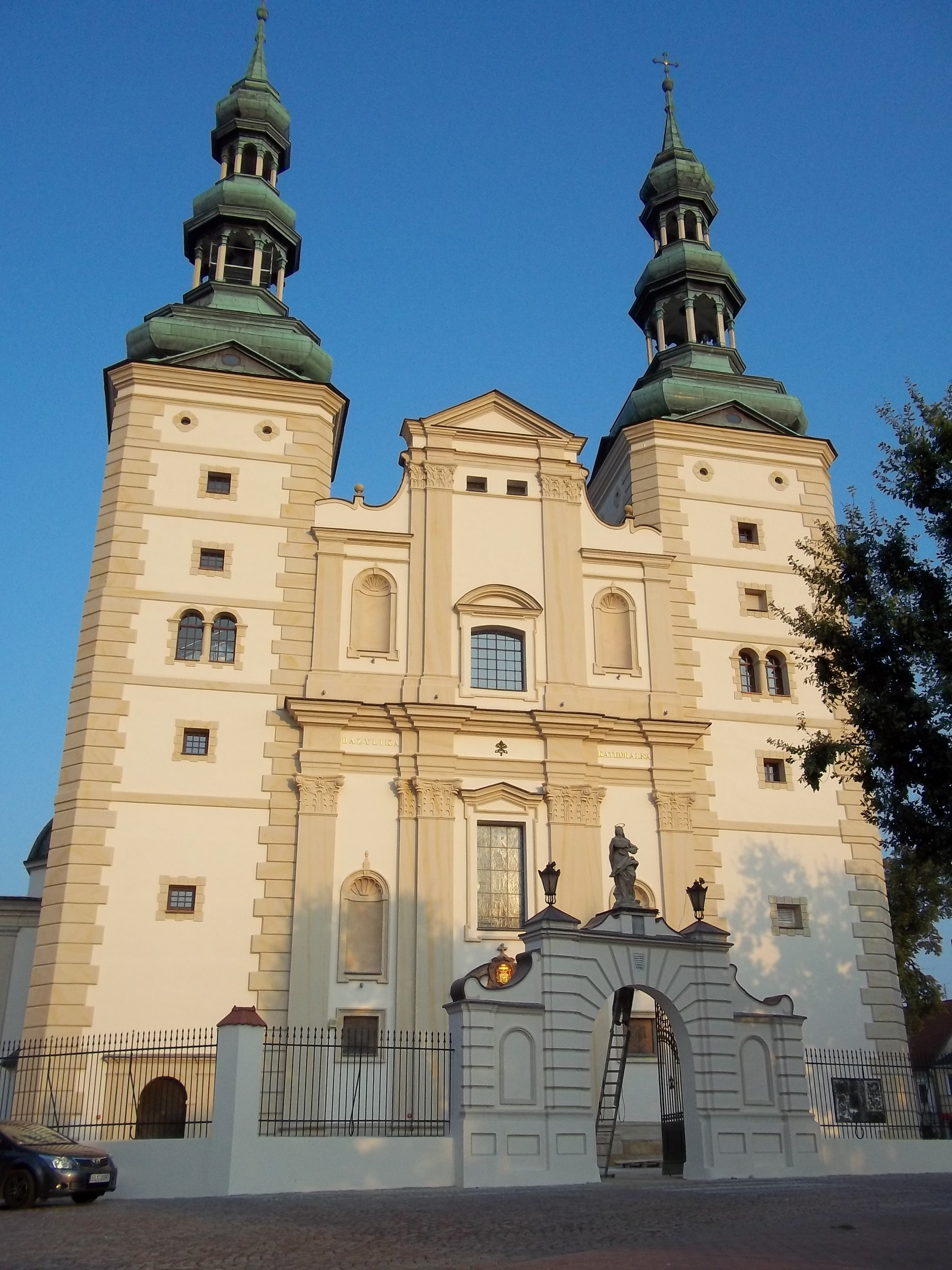
- Cathedral Basilica of the Assumption of the Blessed Virgin Mary and St. Nicholas
- Location: Łowicz
- Country: Poland
- Denomination: Roman Catholic Church

History
- Dedication: The Most Holy Virgin Mary, Queen of Poland

The Cathedral Basilica of the Assumption of the Blessed Virgin Mary and St. Nicholas (Polish: Bazylika katedralna Wniebowzięcia Najświętszej Maryi Panny i św. Mikołaja w Łowiczu ) also called Łowicz Cathedral is a religious building affiliated with the Catholic Church and is located in the city of Łowicz in the Łódź Voivodeship, Poland.

It is a church located in the old market square, called "Mazowiecki Wawel" resting place of 12 archbishops of Gniezno and primates of Poland. On November 13, 2012, the building was included in the list of historical monuments in Poland.

Originally, this place was a wooden church funded in 1100, probably by Prince Władysław I Herman. After a new temple was built in the Gothic style. On 25 April 1433 was elevated to the rank of collegiate church.

The Temple was severely damaged during the battle of Bzura in 1939. After the war it was renewed. On 25 March 1992, Pope John Paul II created the Diocese of Łowicz, bringing the church to the dignity of the cathedral. During his Apostolic Journey the Pope visited Łowicz and June 14, 1999, granted the cathedral the title of minor basilica.

== See also ==
- Roman Catholicism in Poland
- Assumption Cathedral (disambiguation)

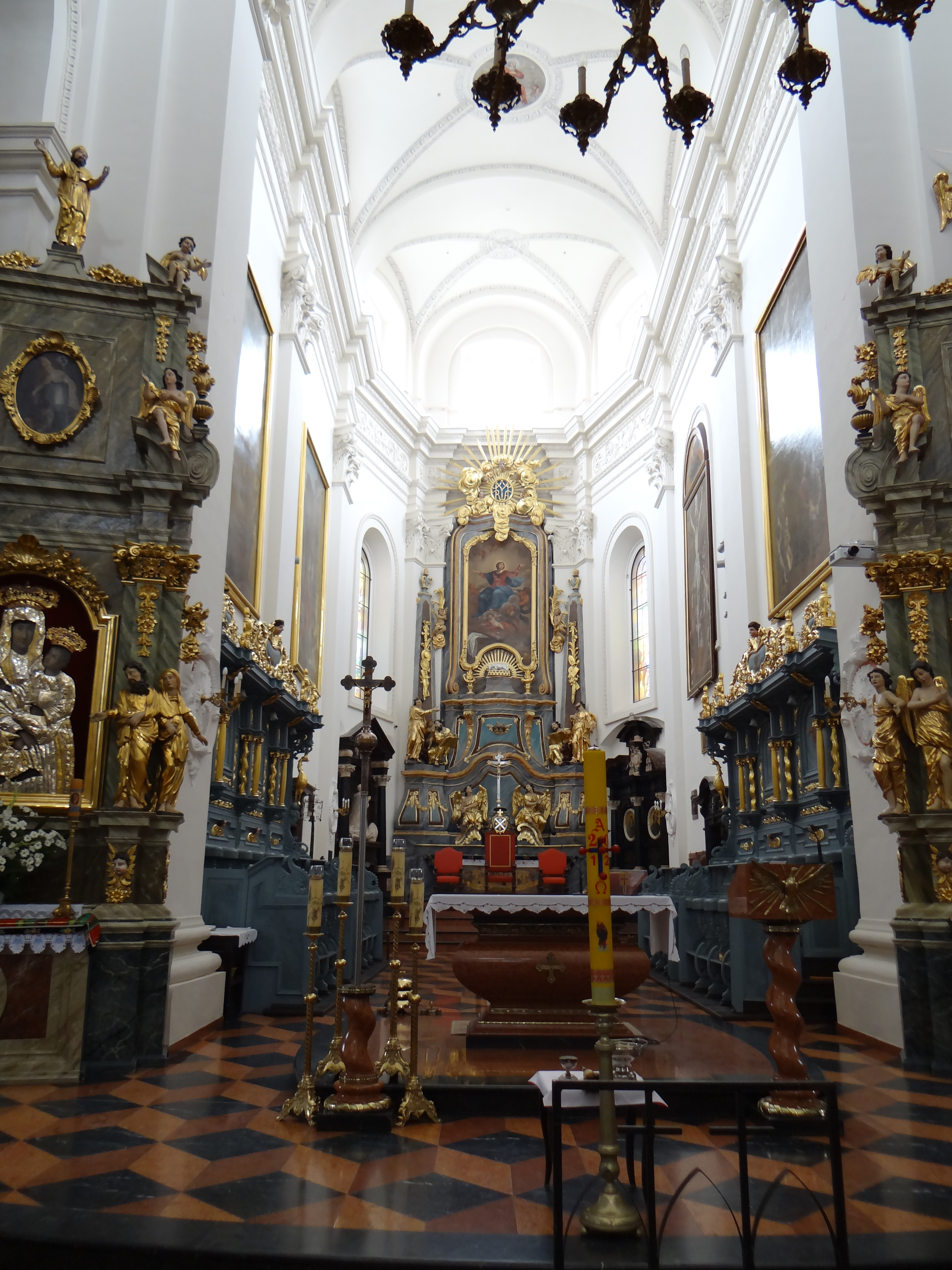
Internal view
