= Fortuna (company) =

Polish beverage company

- Type: Juice
- Manufacturer: Agros Nova
- Origin: Poland
- Introduced: 1987
- Related products: Dr Witt
- Website: www.fortuna.com.pl

Fortuna is a drink beverage company in Poland owned by and part of the Agros Nova. The company was founded in 1987 with the carrot-flavoured Karotka drink in a carton. The company's slogan is Full of Life. In 2003, the company was bought by the Agros Nova firm; the firm expanded the company's different products, bringing more customers to its products.

== History ==
The company slogan and television advertisement in 1999 was Karotka – Full of Life. In 2000, the company began its vegetable mixes and started with the tomato juice flavour which was awarded the Sign of Health X in Poland. In 2003, the company joined the Agros Nova firm. In the same year, the company also introduced the Tabasco flavour and Italian Herbs flavour, which went on sale in August 2004 and improved their Mirando drinks with the glass-bottled 250 ml version. In the same year, the company started its online website and service Fortuna. The Fortuna company the same year had also introduced their milk drinks called Frutimil.

In 2005, the company introduced their duo range of new flavours – by this they mixed apple and mint together and called it the Apple Mint Duo Drink, other products in the range are listed in the list below. In 2008, the company iwa in eighth place in The Best Non Alcoholic Drinks according to Rzeczpospolita Newspaper. In 2009, the company reintroduced its Karotka juice drink with no added sugar and made five new flavours. In 2011, the company part of the Agros Nova sponsored the Polish Taniec Z Gwiazdami Dancing on Ice on TVN (Poland) television channel. In 2012, the company sponsored the Polish Mam Talent (Poland's Got Talent) on TVN (Poland) channel and advertised the company between the show advertisement.

=== Products ===
- Fruit drinks Flavours are: pineapple, white grapefruit, red grapefruit, apple, apple light, mandarin, multivitamin, orange, orange with bits, green grapefruit Sweetie.
- Nectar drinks Flavours are: banana, peach, blackcurrant, plum, red grapefruit (2 Litre), apple (2 Litre), multivitamin (2 Litre) and orange (2 litre).
- Drinks Flavours are: white grapes and red grapes.
- Vegetable juices 100% Flavours are : tomato, Tabasco sauce tomatoes and multi vegetable.
