= Ferrum SA =

Polish ironworks

Ferrum
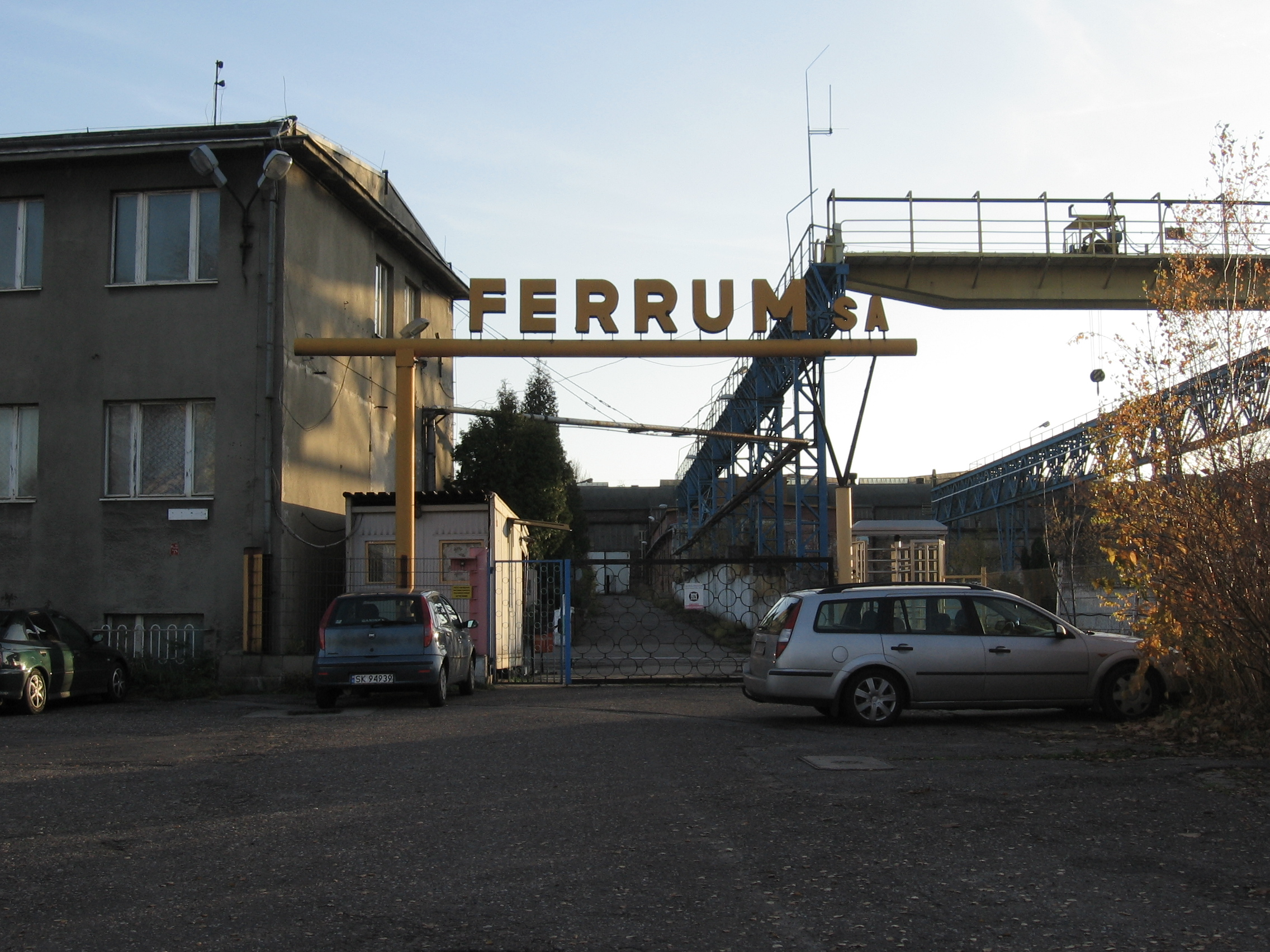
- Entrance to the plant premises
- Trade name: FERRUM S.A.
- Company type: Public
- Traded as: WSE: FER
- ISIN: PLFSING00010
- Industry: Metal industry
- Founded: 1874
- Headquarters: Katowice, Poland
- Area served: Worldwide
- Subsidiaries: ZKS Ferrum SA
- Website: FERRUM SA Website

FERRUM SA (originally Rhein & Co; from December 2004 Ferrum) is an ironworks established in 1874, located in Katowice at 11 Porcelanowa Street, in the Zawodzie district in Poland. The key producer of large diameter steel pipes in Poland. The company's products are used, among others, in petrochemical industry, heating, water and sewage networks, in hydrotechnics, energy and construction. It is listed on the Warsaw Stock Exchange.

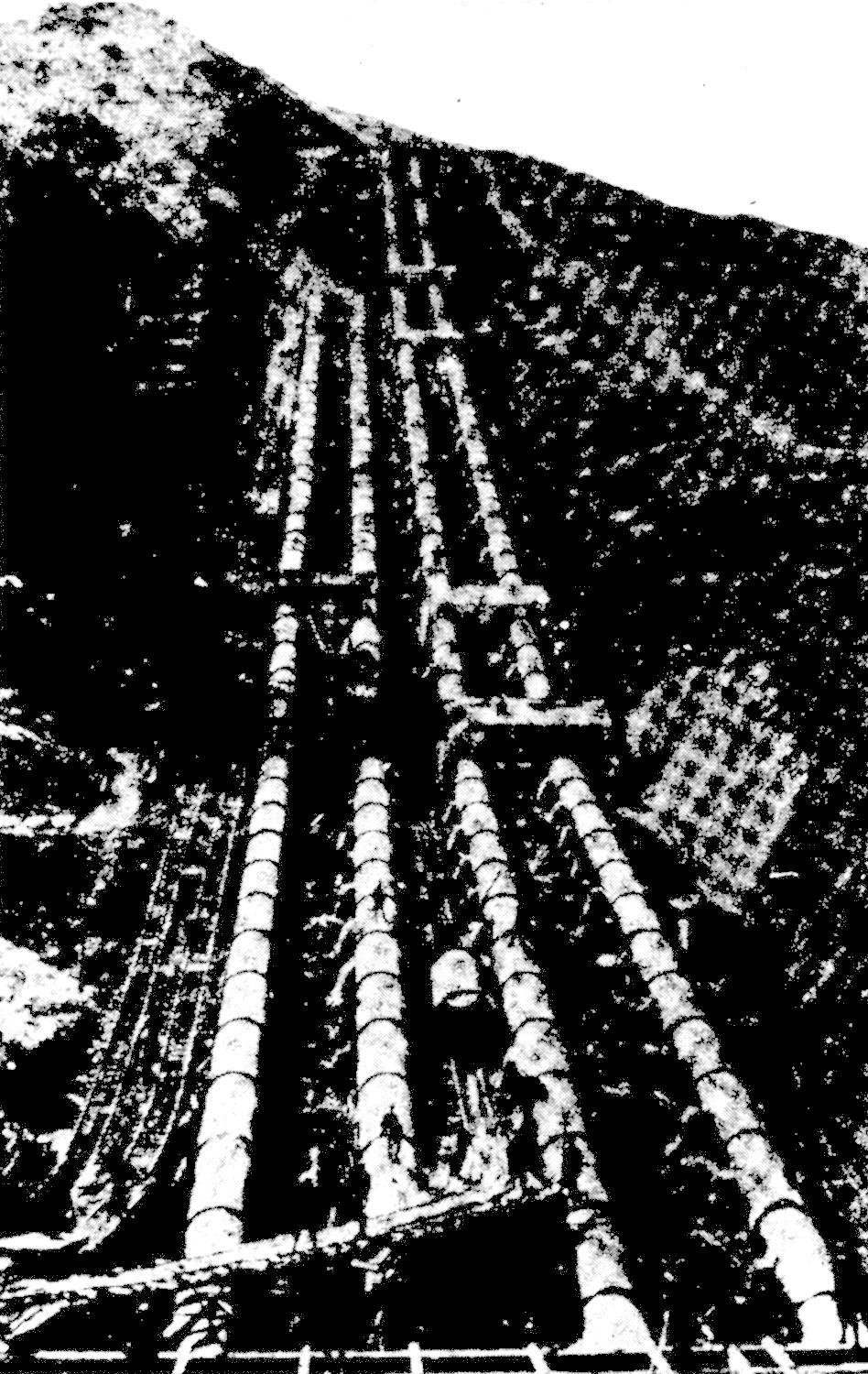
Pipelines made of pipes produced by the Katowice Ferrum Foundry, laid in Japan before World War II

== History ==
A timeline of events from the company's own web site is:

- 1874 – founding of an ironworks by the Berlin machine-building company Rhein & Co in Zawodzie.
- 1890 – merger with the "Jakob" steelworks and further operation under the name Ferrum.
- 1900 – implementation of the technology for the production of pipes supplying water to turbines with increased strength and dimensions (up to 3,000 mm in diameter and 46 m in length), thanks to which the foundry became a renowned company fulfilling orders for investors around the world.
- 1901 – progressive development of the foundry; creation of the Ferrum workers' colony.
- 1902 – further internationalization, the ironworks produced the first turbine pipeline for Peru.
- 1909 – the company adopted a joint-stock structure and changed its name to Ferrum Aktiongesellschaft.
- 1914–1945 - world wars caused production to temporarily shift to the needs of the militarized economy of the Third Reich.
- 1946 – the company was nationalized and became part of the Ministry of Metallurgy.
- 1969 – modernization of the ironworks; the company's products were imported by countries in Europe, Asia, North America and South America.
- 1995 – transformation of the ironworks from a state-owned enterprise into a sole-shareholder joint-stock company of the State Treasury and implementation of a restructuring program.
- 1997 – entry to the Warsaw Stock Exchange.
- 1999 - extension of production capacity by adding line for high frequency induction welded steel pipes.
- 2002 – separation of a daughter company called ZKS FERRUM from the ironworks, specializing in the production of welded structures for the energy, metallurgy, and cement industries.
- 2005 – change of the name of the foundry to FERRUM S.A.
- 2018 – growth of the plant and increase in production capacity through the installation of a modern line of spirally welded pipes.
- 2021 – expansion of the spiral series with highly specialized 711×17.5 mm pipes, produced only by a narrow group of producers in the world.
- 2023 – adoption of the "Development Strategy of FERRUM S.A. until 2029” and signing a letter of intent with the Katowice Special Economic Zone as part of the further development of the Group.

== Business profile ==
The company specializes in the production of metal elements. The flagship company produces steel pipes with external and internal insulation with a diameter of up to over 2 meters. Currently, it sells its products to Poland and also exports to Germany, Hungary, Austria, Denmark, Sweden and Serbia, among others. The daughter company ZKS Ferrum produces large-size welded structures.

Ferrum group products and services are used in the following sectors:

- Petrochemistry: transmission infrastructure, gas pipelines, flammable materials transmission pipes, LPG tanks, underground chambers, autoclaves.
- Heating: heating networks, heat-resistant pipes.
- Waterworks and sewage: transmission infrastructure.
- Construction: structural pipes, load-bearing structures.
- Energy: industrial pipelines, renewable energy infrastructure, bodies of nuclear generators and turbines, elements of wind towers.
- Metallurgy: blast furnace jackets, converters, rotating towers, ladles.
- Heavy industry: dryers, ball mills, cylinders, drums, tanks, drums, bushings.
- Services: assembly, non-destructive testing, mechanical and heat treatment, anti-corrosion protection.

== Perspectives ==
In December 2023, it was announced that as part of the "Development Strategy of FERRUM S.A. plan by 2029", the Group intends to introduce further improvements to increase its operational efficiency, profitability and competitiveness on the global market.

The selected pillars of this concept are further modernization of the machinery, gradual increase in the share of pipes for transmitting hydrogen and ammonia in the company's product portfolio (its goal is to gain significant shares in individual market segments by 2029). Expansion of the laboratory complex and R&D programs will also be a priority. in cooperation with strategic partners with leading research institutions, in particular AGH University in Krakow and the Silesian University of Technology in Katowice.

== Historical value ==
On the company's premises there are historic buildings under conservation protection, which are evidence of material culture: an accounting building, a business administration office building, a flux warehouse, and a building of the investment management branchi.

The first scientific monograph of the plant was created at the University of Silesia in 1976 under the supervision of Dr. Antoni Molenda.

== Bibliography ==
- Andrzej Topol, Stan badań nad dziejami Polski Ludowej na Uniwersytecie Śląskim, w: Życie Szkoły Wyższej, nr 7-8/1977
- Katowice 1865-1945. Zarys rozwoju miasta. Red. J. Szaflarski, Śląski Instytut Naukowy w Katowicach, Wydawnictwo "Śląsk", Katowice 1978
- Nałęcz-Gostomski Władysław: Dzieje i rozwój Wielkich Katowic jako ośrodka górnośląskiego przemysłu i stolicy autonomicznego Województwa Śląskiego, wyd. Magistrat Wielkich Katowic, Katowice 1926
- Wieszala, Robert. "The Effectiveness of Environmental Management in a Metallurgical Company's Sustainable Development". Metalurgia. 49 (4): 353–356
