= Mirosław Szonert =

Polish film and television actor

Miroslaw Szonert (25 December 1926, Łowicz, Poland – 31 October 1995, Łódź) was a Polish film and television actor. A graduate of the National Film School in Łódź, Szonert was an actor at the Powszechny Theatre in Łódź.
