= Andrzej Dziuba =

Polish politician (born 1956)

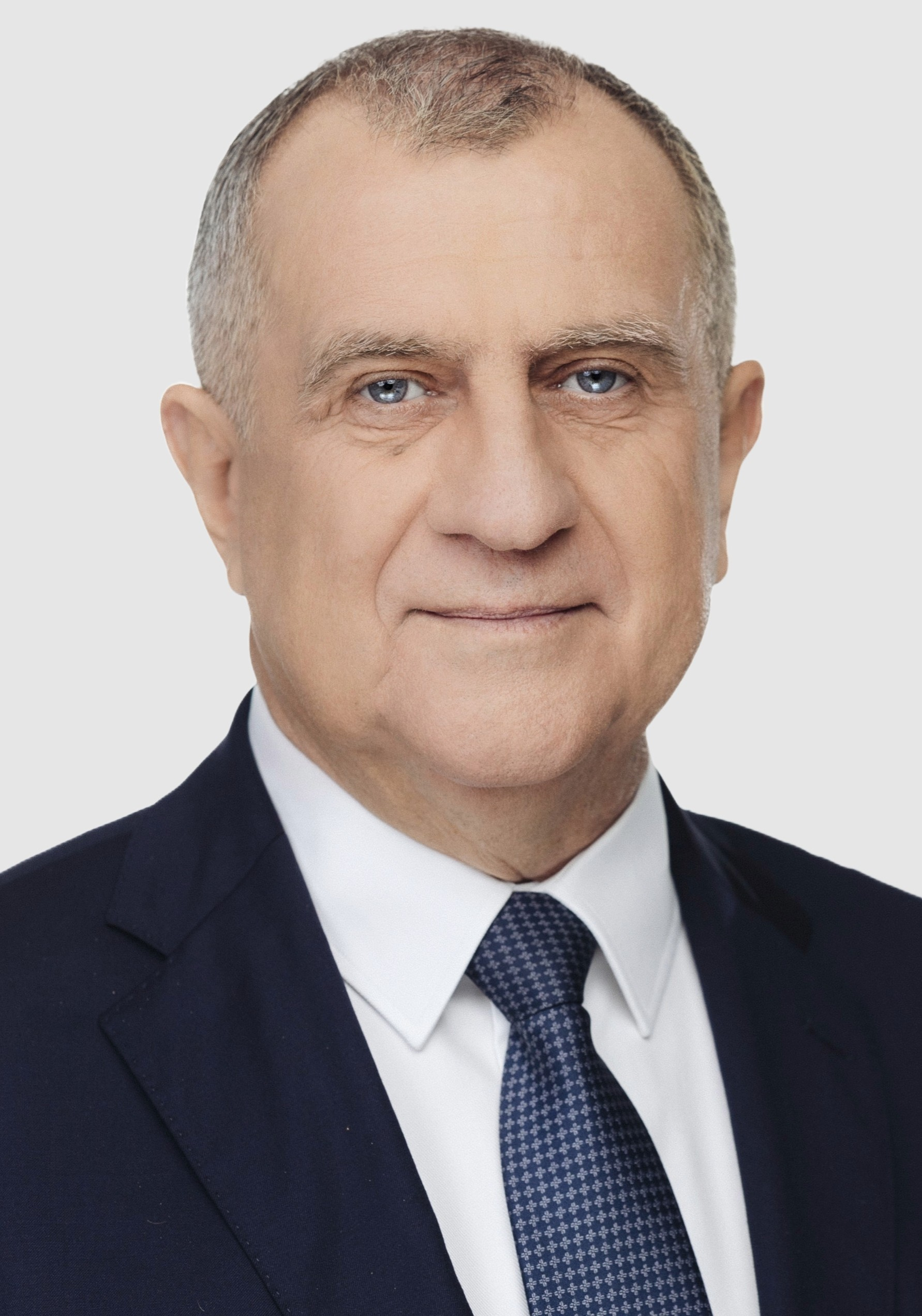
- Andrzej Dziuba in 2023

Member of the Senate
- Incumbent
- Assumed office 12 November 2023
- Constituency: Constituency no. 75

President of Tychy
- In office 2000–2023
- Preceded by: Aleksander Gądek
- Succeeded by: Bogdan Białowąs

Personal details
- Born: Andrzej Dziuba; 1 December 1956 (age 69) Wrocław, Poland
- Party: New Poland (since 2025); New Poland - Centre (since 2026)
- Education: Wrocław University of Science and Technology

Andrzej Józef Dziuba (born 1 December 1956 in Wrocław) is a Polish local politician who served as the President of Tychy between 2000 and 2023, and is a member of the 11th term of the Polish Senate.

== Biography ==
He graduated from the Faculty of Mining at Wrocław University of Science and Technology and completed postgraduate studies in mining economics at the AGH University of Kraków. He worked at the Ziemowit Coal Mine in Lędziny, where over the course of 12 years he rose through most of the company's ranks, eventually reaching the position of chief investment engineer. In 1992, he moved to DBT Scharf Polska Sp. z o.o., where he was involved in marketing and sales.

In 2000, he was elected mayor of Tychy (representing the Freedom Union). Two years later, running on his own ticket, he became the first mayor of that city to be elected in a direct election (in the second round, he received over 63% of the vote). On November 26, 2006, he was re-elected to this position, running on his own committee with the support of the Civic Platform, receiving 15,913 votes (52% of the vote) in the second round of the 2006 Polish local elections. In 2010, 2014, and 2018, he was re-elected, winning each time in the first round. He served on the supervisory boards of the local government-owned companies Stadion Wrocław and Przedsiębiorstwo Komunikacji Miejskiej in Sosnowiec.

In the 2023 Polish parliamentary election, he was elected to the 11th Senate term, running on behalf of the Andrzej Dziuba Election Committee – Senate Pact 2023 in constituency No. 75. Consequently, he stepped down from his position as mayor of Tychy. During the 11th Senate term, he became a member of the Senate Group of Independents and Local Government Representatives (Polish: Koło Senackie Niezależni i Samorządni). In 2025, he became one of the leaders of the newly formed party New Poland. In January 2026, the existing Senate Group of Independents and Local Government Representatives adopted its name. In March of the same year, he co-founded the New Poland – Centre Senate Club.

== Social activity ==
He served as chairman of the board of trustees of the Higher School of Management and Social Sciences in Tychy, a member of the board of the Association of Mining Municipalities in Poland, and a member of the supervisory board of the Katowice Special Economic Zone. He was elected to the board of the Association of Polish Cities.

In the 1990s, he was president of the GKS Tychy hockey club and became an honorary member of that club. In 2000, he received the Gold Badge of the Polish Ice Hockey Federation.

== Awards and honors ==
In 2014, for his commitment and contribution to the development of the local community and the local government, President Bronisław Komorowski awarded him the Gold Cross of Merit. In 2013, he received the title of “Manager of the Year 2012” awarded by the Silesian Association of Managers. He has been recognized in rankings of mayors in Poland compiled by “Newsweek Polska” (2012) and “Dziennik Gazeta Prawna” (2013).

== Private life ==
He was born to Józef and Anna Dziuba. He married Ewa Dziuba, and has two daughters - Aleksandra and Marta.
