= Łowicz =

Polish town in the Łódź Voivodeship

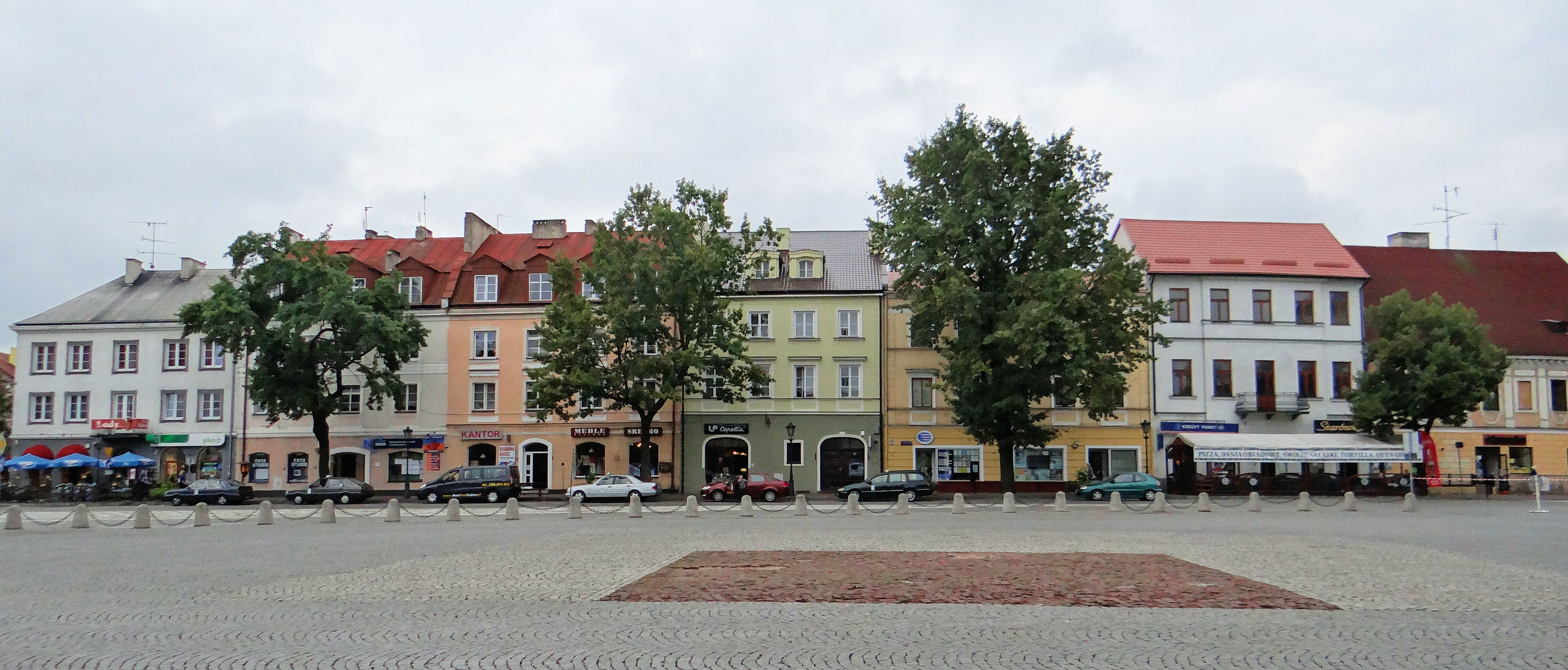
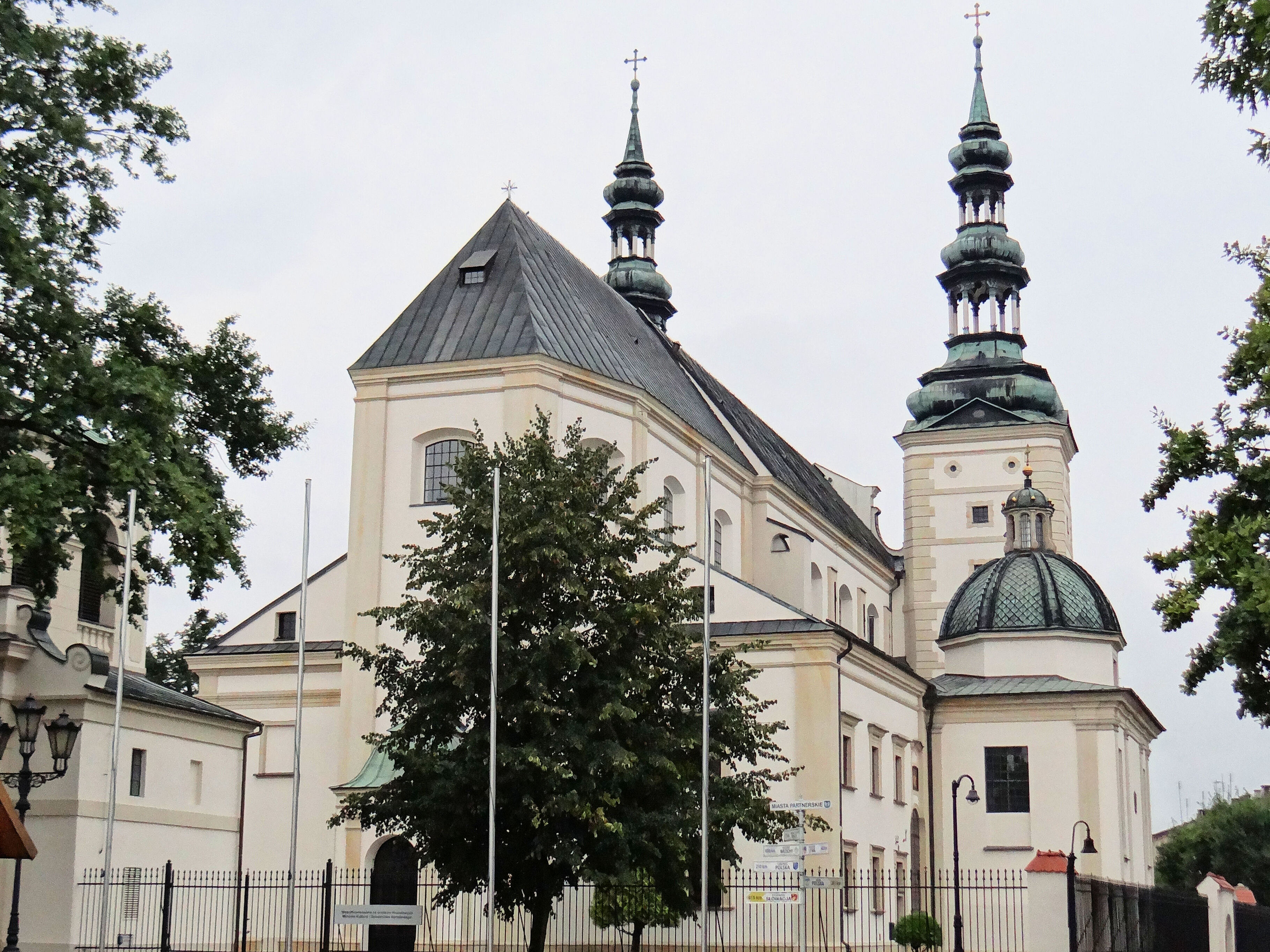
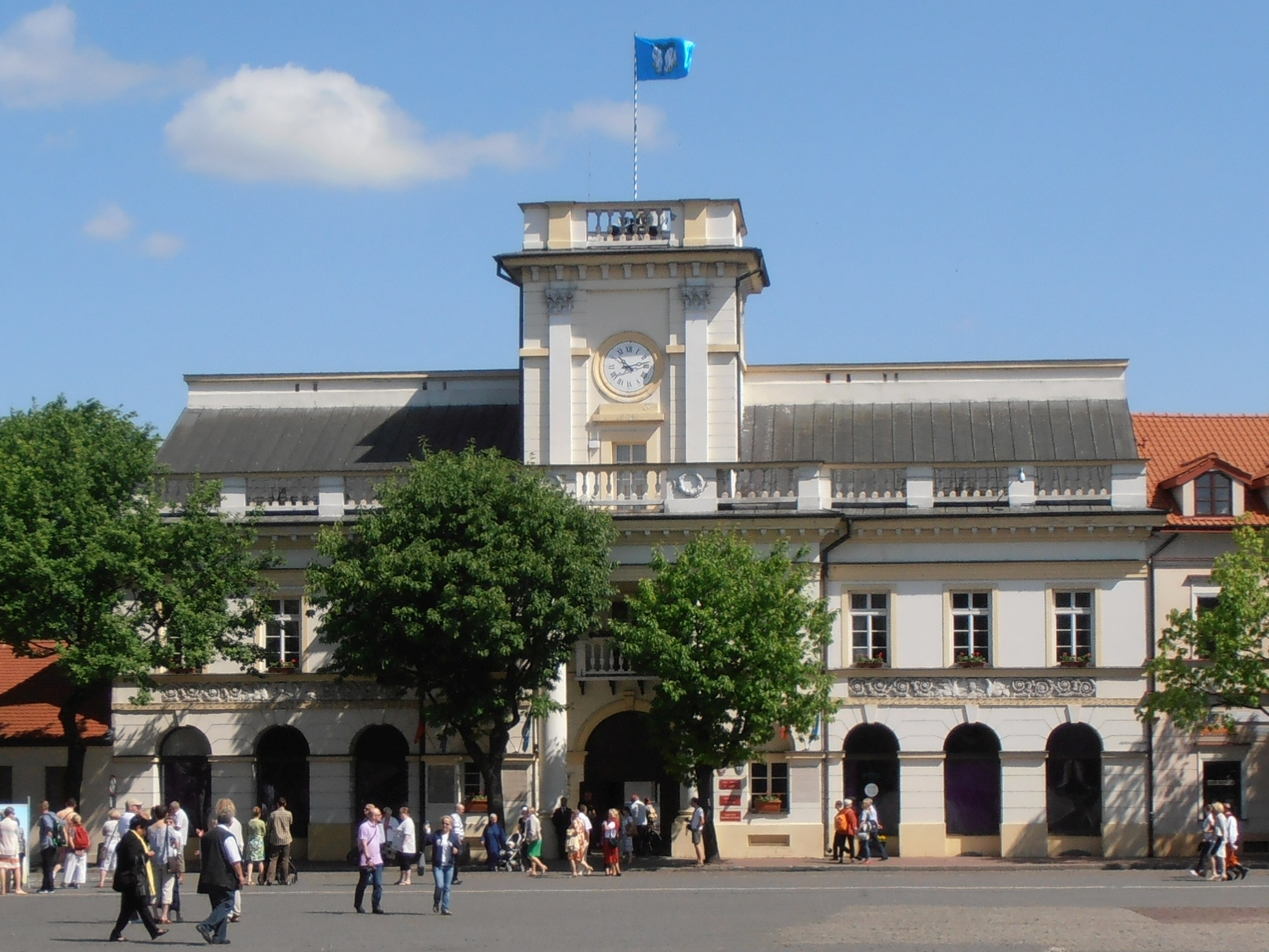
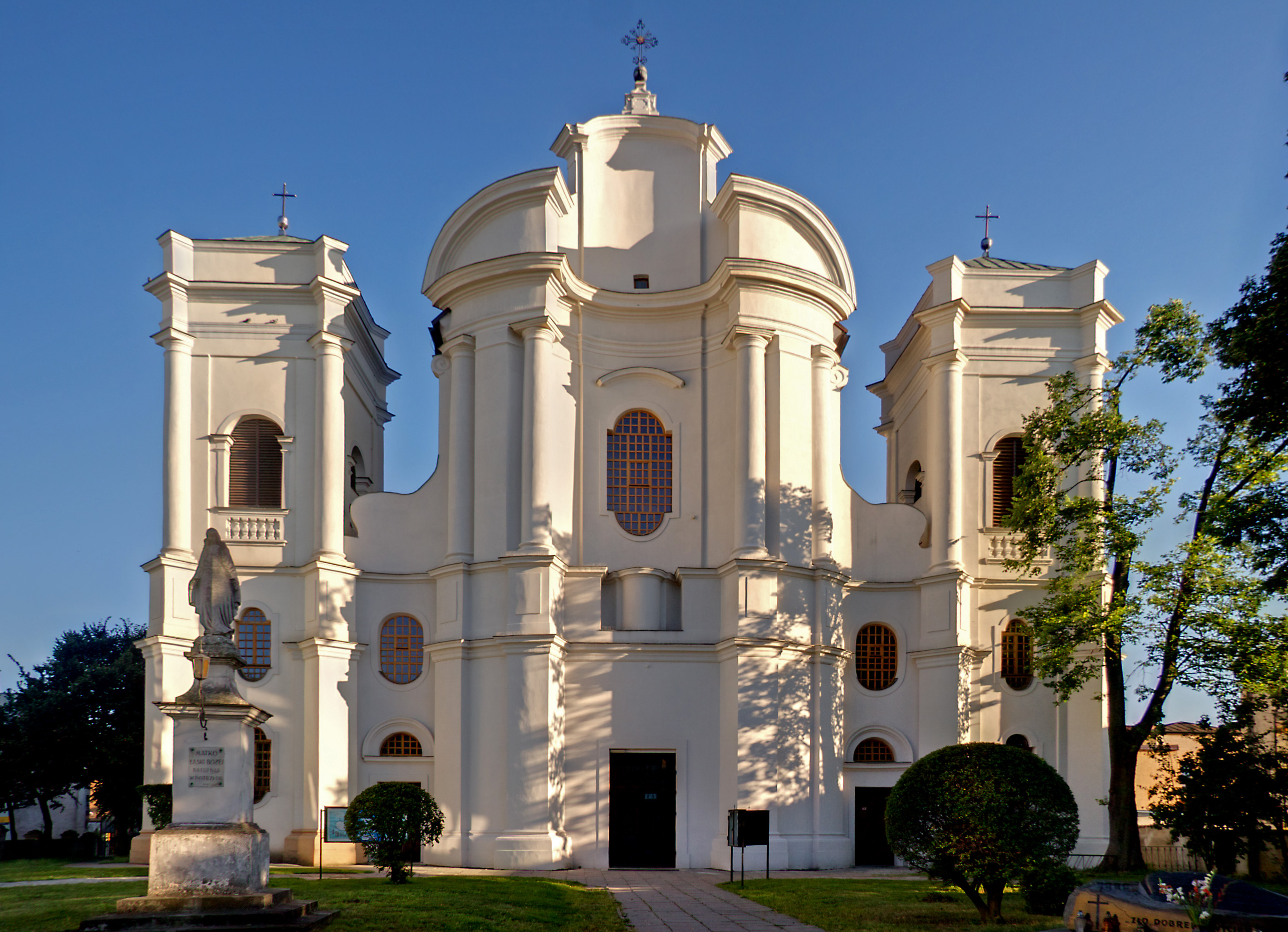
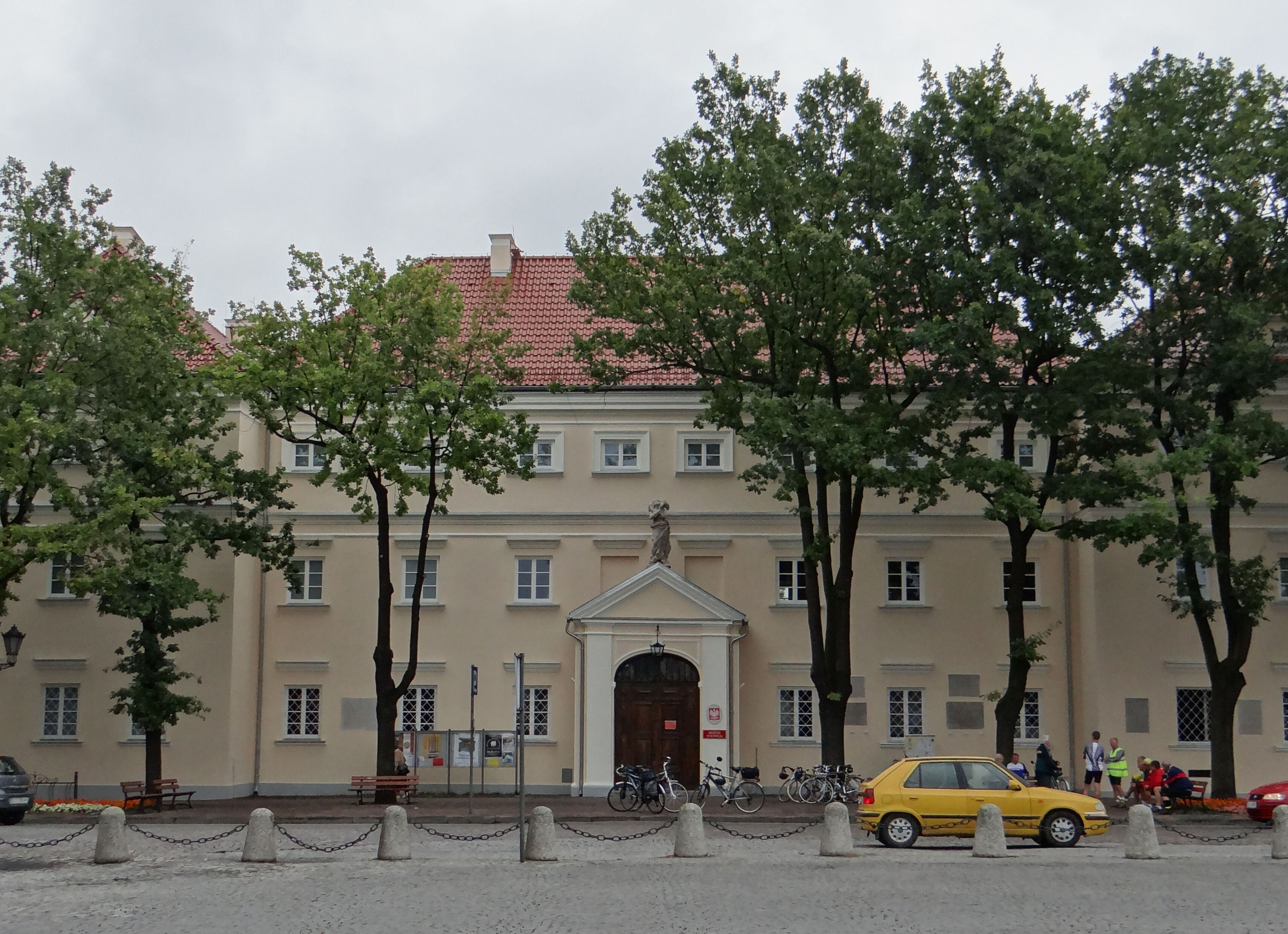
- From top, left to right: Market Square; Cathedral; Town Hall; Piarist Church; Museum

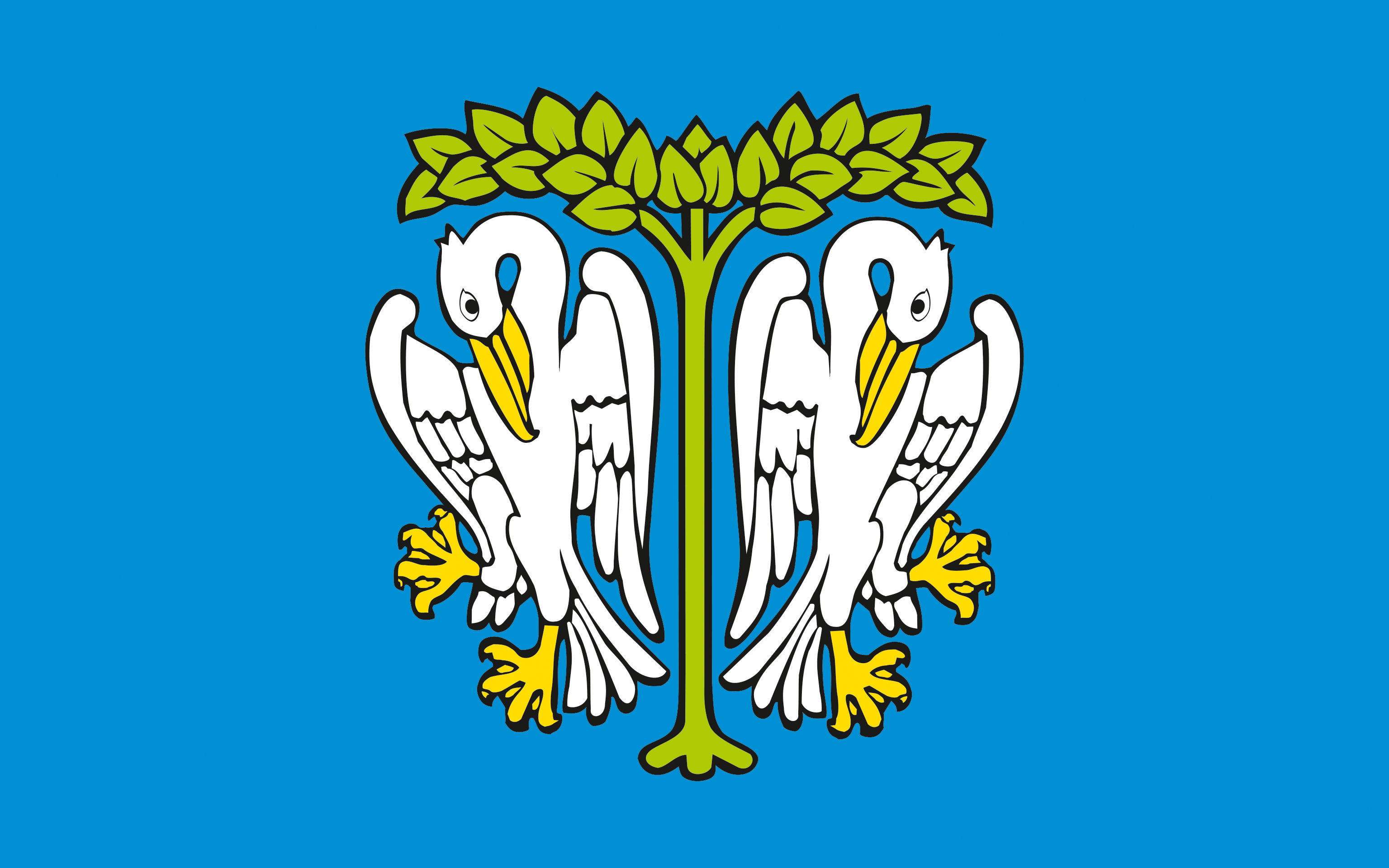
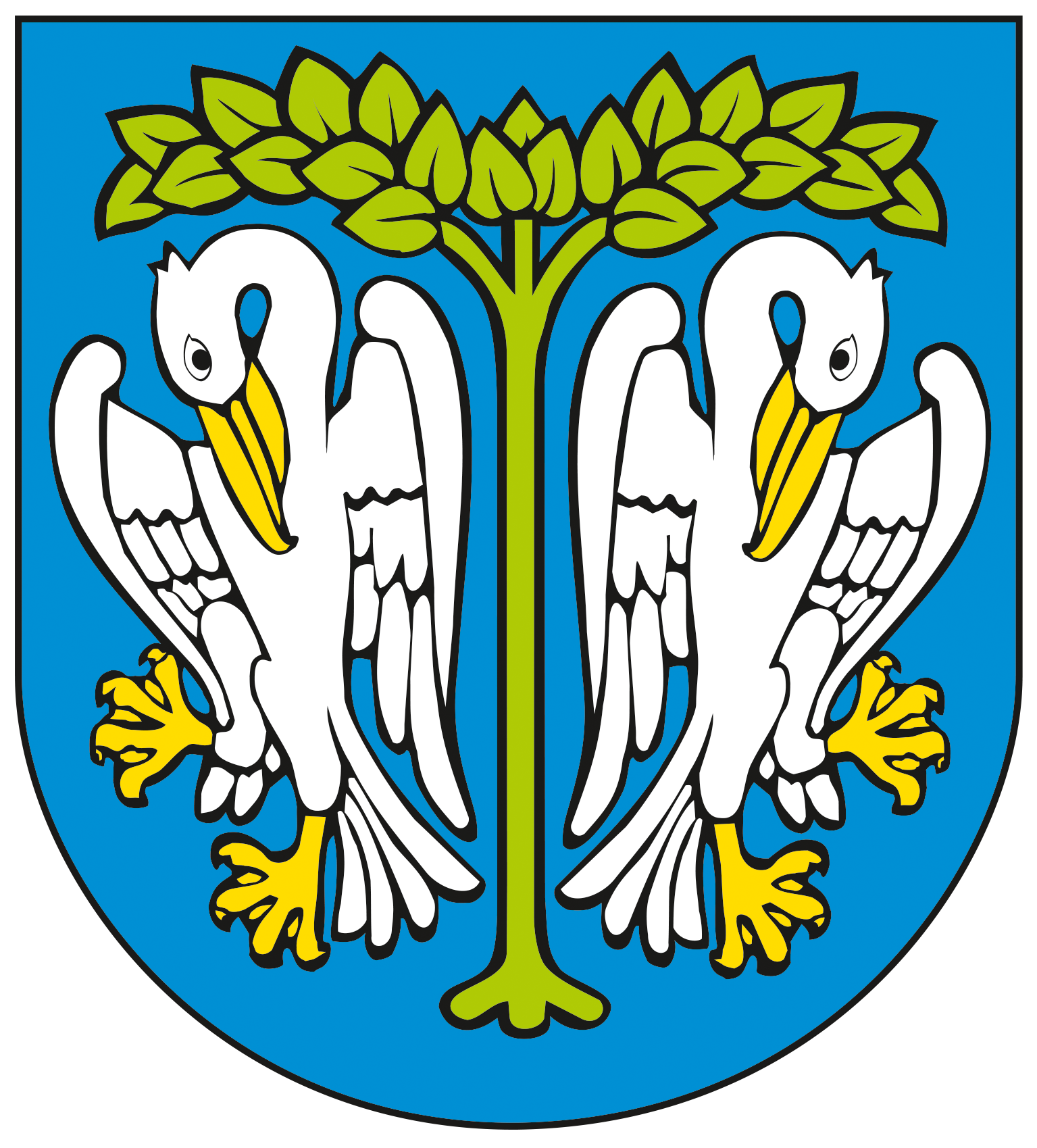
- Flag Coat of arms

- Location within Poland
- Coordinates: 52°6′N 19°56′E
- Country: Poland
- Voivodeship: Łódź
- County: Łowicz
- Gmina: Łowicz (urban gmina)
- Established: before 1136
- Town rights: before 1298

Government
  - Mayor: Mariusz Siewiera (Ind.)

Area
  - Total: 23.41 km^{2} (9.04 sq mi)

Population (31 December 2021)
  - Total: 27,436 ▼
  - Density: 1,172/km^{2} (3,035/sq mi)
- Time zone: UTC+1 (CET)
  - Summer (DST): UTC+2 (CEST)
- Postal code: 99-400 to 99-402
- Area code: +48 46
- Vehicle registration: ELC
- Website: www.lowicz.eu

Łowicz [ˈwɔvʲit͡ʂ] is a town in central Poland with 27,436 inhabitants (2021). It is situated in the Łódź Voivodeship. Together with a nearby station of Bednary, Łowicz is a major rail junction of central Poland, where the line from Warsaw splits into two directions—towards Poznań, and Łódź. Also, the station Łowicz Main is connected through a secondary-importance line with Skierniewice.

Łowicz was a residence of Polish primates in the Polish–Lithuanian Commonwealth. They served as regents when the town became a temporary "capital" of Poland during the interregnum. As a result, Łowicz has its own bishop and a Cathedral Basilica in spite of its considerably small size. The Cathedral Basilica is designated a Historic Monument of Poland, and the ruins of a former bishop's castle can be found on the outskirts of town. Also, the town was at the centre of the largest battle of the German invasion of Poland, the Battle of the Bzura River, in the opening campaign of World War II.

Łowicz has an important ethnographic museum (Muzeum w Łowiczu) exhibiting Polish art and historical artifacts from the region. Also, Łowicz features a popular skansen with traditional wooden houses. It is a vast open-air display of historical structures depicting traditional Polish village-life; a collection of artifacts spread over a 17-hectare (42 acre) site, just outside the town.

Łowicz is a prominent site of food production, i.e. fruit and vegetable preserves and dairy products, popular in Poland and abroad.

Near the town is the Maurzyce Bridge, the first welded road-bridge in the world, built in 1928 across the river Słudwia. It was designed in 1927 by Stefan Bryła from the Lwów University of Technology.

== History ==
=== Middle Ages ===
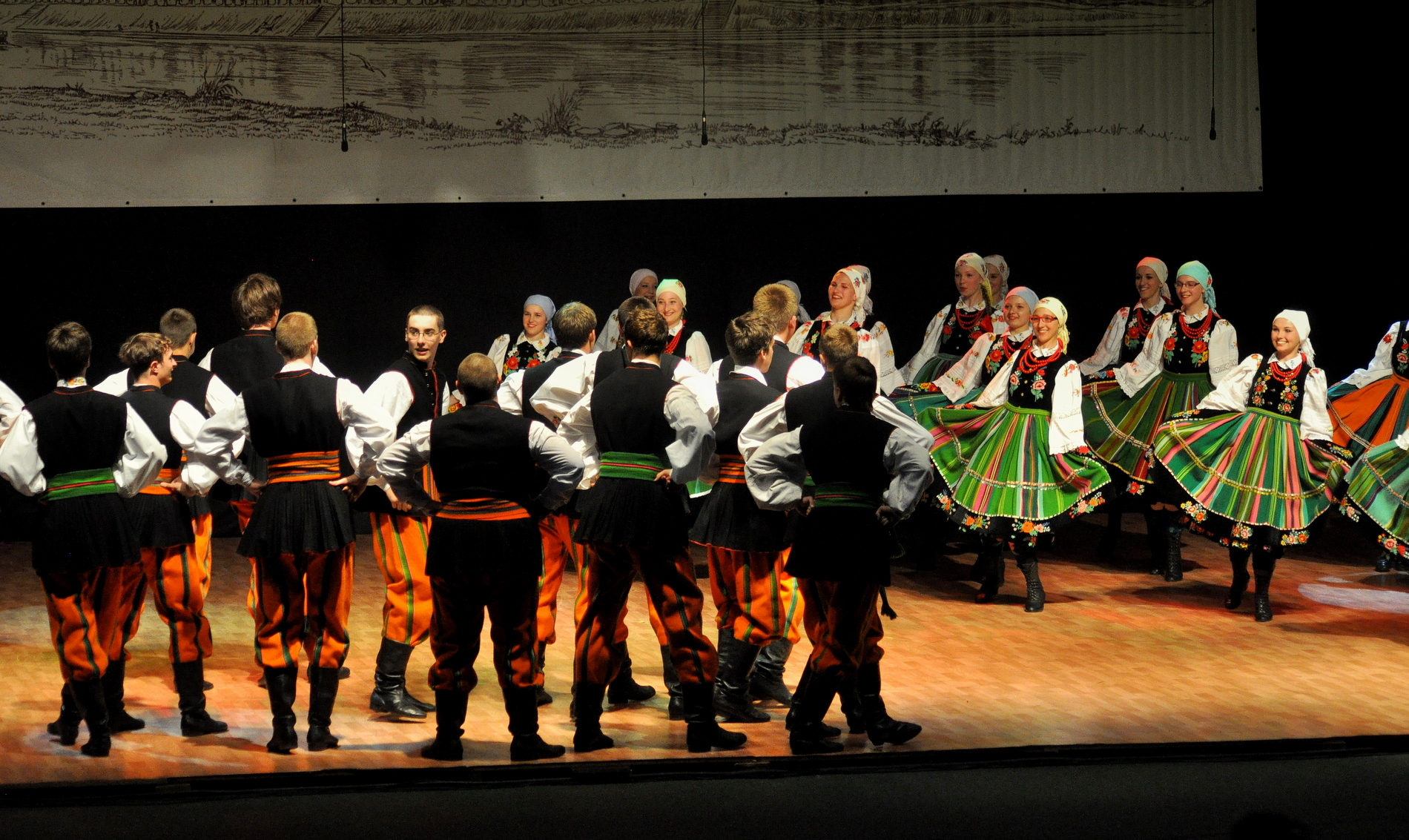
Łowicz traditional folk costume

The history of Lowicz dates back to the 12th century, when a gord, which guarded the swampy Bzura river ford existed in the location of the castle. Lowicz, spelled as Loviche, was first mentioned in a papal bull of Pope Innocent II, on July 7, 1136. In this document, the pope confirmed the right of the Archbishops of Gniezno to own local land. In 1214 or 1215 at Wolborz, Piast Dukes of four Polish provinces: Leszek I the White of Kraków, Konrad I of Masovia, Wladyslaw Odonic of Kalisz and Casimir I of Opole issued the so-called Immunity Privilege, in which they confirmed the fact that Archbishops of Gniezno owned Lowicz. At that time, Lowicz was still called villa (village), even though the archbishops’ mansion already existed here.

It is not known when Lowicz received town charter. First document which calls it oppidium (town) dates back to 1298, and was issued by Duke Boleslaw I of Płock. Before that, in 1263, Łowicz was ransacked and burned in a Lithuanian raid. In 1350, a Polish-Danish alliance was formed in Łowicz. According to chronicler Jan of Czarnkow, in ca. 1355 Archbishop Jaroslaw of Bogoria and Skotnik built a brick Gothic castle in the location of the former gord. The castle became one of residences of Archbishops of Gniezno and Primates of Poland. Furthermore, in ca. 1358, he granted Magdeburg rights to the newly established New Town (Nowe Miasto). New Civitas of Lowicz was located east of the old gord, along the Bzura and around the wooden church, which stood in the location of contemporary Cathedral Basilica.

In the late Middle Ages Lowicz was the seat of a castellany. Located on the border between the Kingdom of Poland and the Duchy of Masovia, it remained under firm control of the Gniezno Archbishops. In the mid-14th century Lowicz, together with 111 adjacent villages, was the biggest church property in Poland. On May 17, 1359, Siemowit III, Duke of Masovia confirmed the ownership of Lowicz by the Gniezno Primates. Nevertheless, the dukes of Masovia on several occasions tried to place Lowicz under their authority, which resulted in conflicts with Polish kings, who supported the Archbishops. On April 8, 1382, Siemowit IV, Duke of Masovia besieged Łowicz, and such conflicts occasionally returned until the incorporation of Mazovia into Poland.

Lowicz prospered in the 15th century. In 1404, Archbishop Mikolaj Kurowski funded the first brick church in town, and a new Roman Catholic parish. In the 1430s, old wooden church in Lowicz's Old Town was replaced by a brick, Gothic complex. On April 25, 1433, Archbishop Wojciech Jastrzebiec named it a Collegiate church, and soon afterwards, a branch of Kraków Academy was established here. This collegiate church became later the current Łowicz Cathedral.

On October 24, 1419, Archbishop Mikołaj Trąba confirmed the town charter of Łowicz and unified legal regulations of the three districts of Łowicz: Podgrodzie (Suburb), Stare Miasto (Old Town) and Nowe Miasto (New Town). In 1443, a town hall was built in the market square of the Old Town. Due to its convenient locations, multiple royal privileges and frequent fairs, Łowicz prospered. Administratively it was located in the Rawa Voivodeship in the Greater Poland Province.

=== Modern era ===
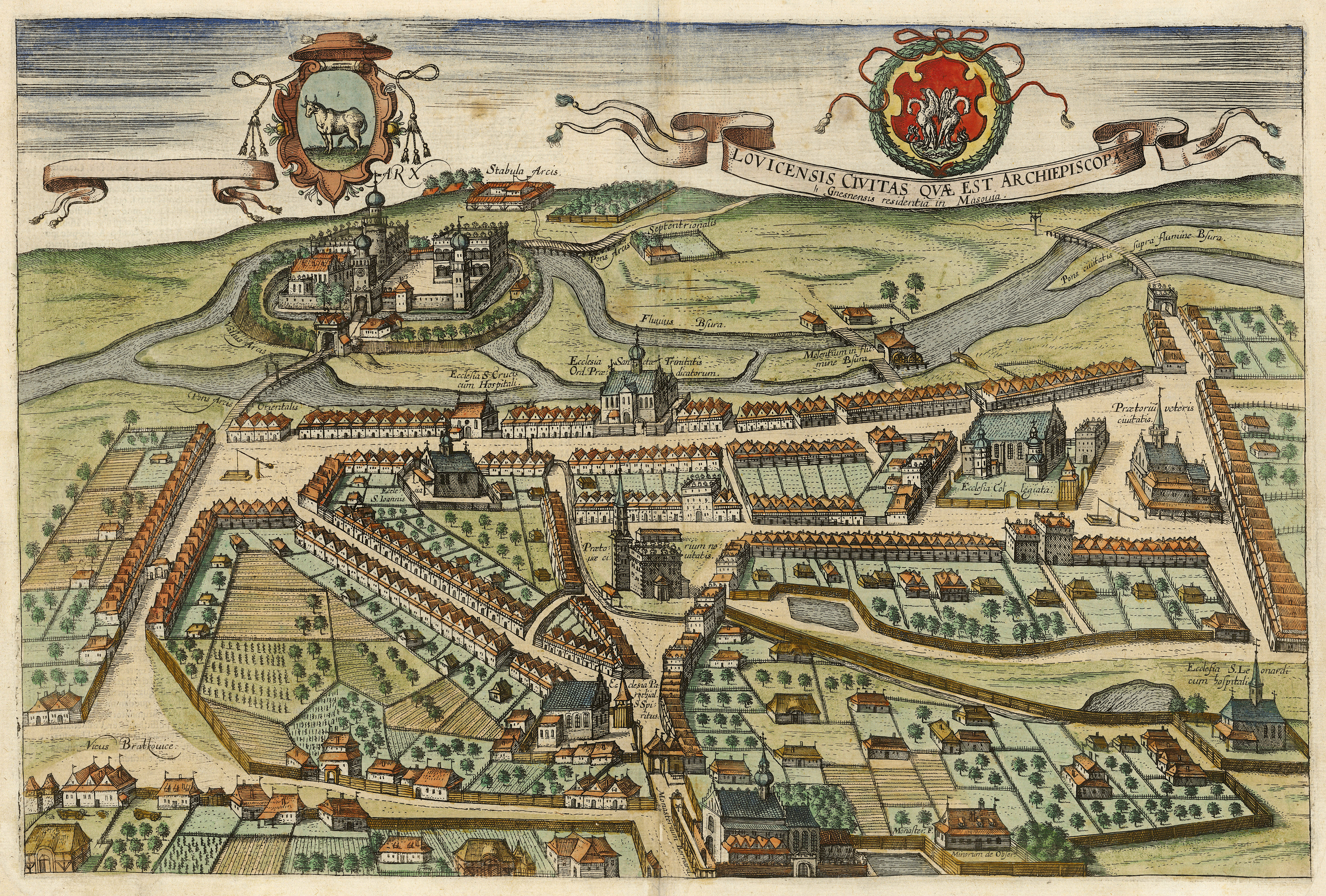
Early 17th-century view of Łowicz

The town remained under the authority of the Archbishops of Gniezno, and as a residency of the Primates of Poland, since 1572 Łowicz occasionally served as a second capital of the Kingdom, during the periods known as interregnum. The period of prosperity ended after the disastrous Swedish invasion of Poland (1655–1660). The town was visited by Polish kings John II Casimir Vasa and John III Sobieski, as well as Polish national hero Tadeusz Kościuszko. Almost completely destroyed, Łowicz never regained its importance and turned into a small, local town. Nevertheless, it remained a cultural center, as in 1668 one of the first Piarist Colleges in Poland-Lithuania was opened here. One of two main routes connecting Warsaw and Dresden ran through Łowicz in the 18th century and Kings Augustus II the Strong and Augustus III of Poland often traveled that route. Łowicz was also a garrison town of the Polish Crown Army, with the Prince Frederick Mounted Regiment and 3rd, 7th and 9th Infantry Regiments stationed there at various times.

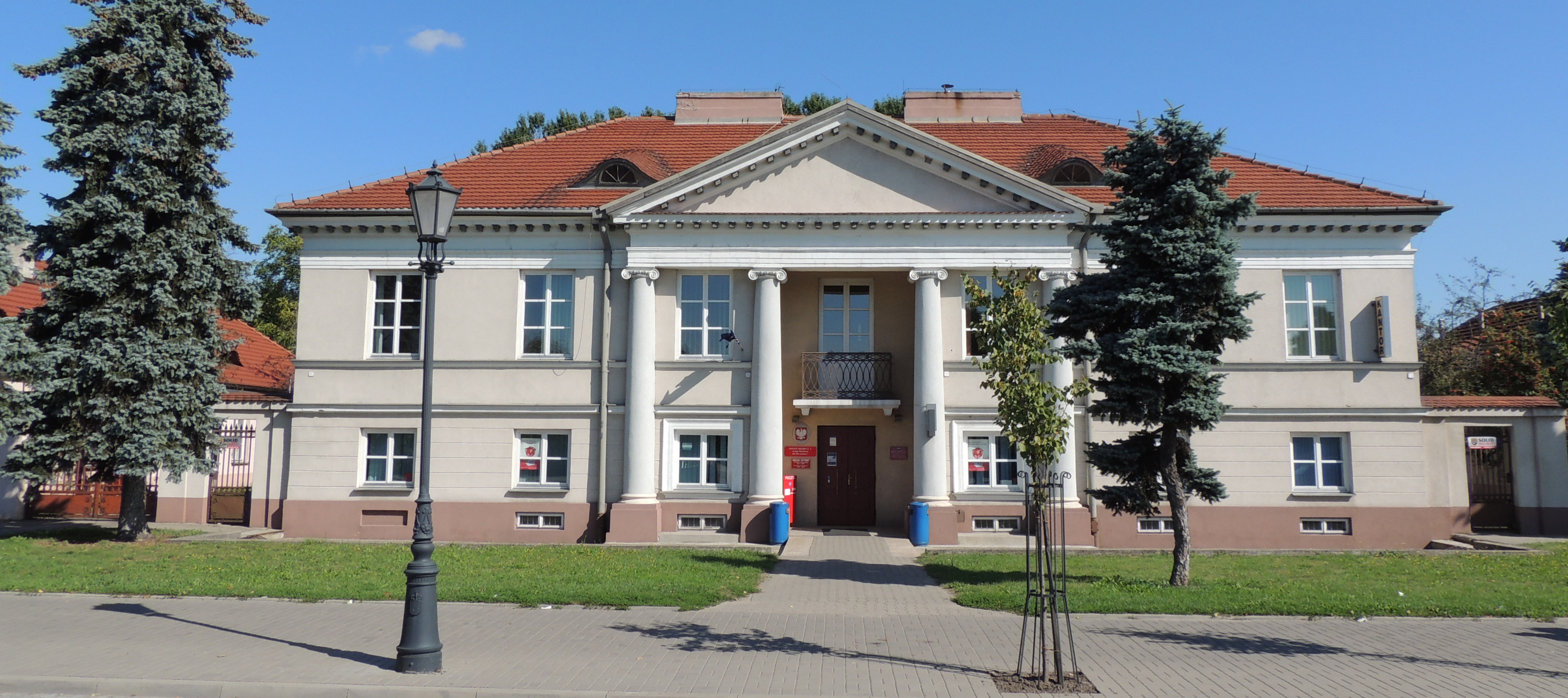
Main post office

After the Second Partition of Poland (1793) Łowicz was annexed by the Kingdom of Prussia. In 1807 it became part of the Duchy of Warsaw, and from 1815 until 1915 it belonged to Russian-controlled Congress Poland (later Vistula Land). The body of Prince Józef Poniatowski was temporarily kept in the Collegiate church in Łowicz before his burial in the Wawel Cathedral in Kraków. In 1820, the real estate of the Archbishops of Gniezno became the property of Grand Duke Constantine Pavlovich of Russia and his wife Joanna Grudzinska, who was granted the title of the Duchess of Lowicz. On July 9, 1822, Tsar Alexander I of Russia formally established the Duchy of Łowicz. In 1826, the town was visited by young Fryderyk Chopin.

In 1831, following the last will of Joanna Grudzinska, the Duchy of Lowicz became the property of Polish rulers. Since at that time Russian Tsars regarded themselves as Kings of Poland, the duchy belonged to them until World War I. Following the request of General Ivan Paskevich, who was the governor of Poland, Tsar Nicholas I of Russia gave permission for construction of the first railroad in the Russian Partition of Poland. The Warsaw–Vienna railway was completed in 1848, giving Łowicz rail connection with Warsaw, Kraków, Vienna and Wrocław. In 1861, Łowicz Główny railway station was built. Due to the construction of additional line to Koluszki (November 1866), Łowicz emerged as a rail hub, which contributed to its development. On July 26, 1863, during the January Uprising, a small Polish insurgent unit attacked the Russian troops stationed in the town, but soon withdrew.

Following the Act of 5th November, the Duchy of Łowicz was annexed into the Kingdom of Poland (1916–18), which was a puppet state of the German Empire. After World War I, in 1918, Poland regained independence, and Łowicz became again part of Poland. In the Second Polish Republic, Lowicz and the County of Lowicz belonged to Warsaw Voivodeship, but on April 1, 1938, it was moved to Lodz Voivodeship (see Territorial changes of Polish Voivodeships on April 1, 1938). In the interbellum Łowicz was visited by Presidents of Poland Stanisław Wojciechowski and Ignacy Mościcki.

=== World War II ===
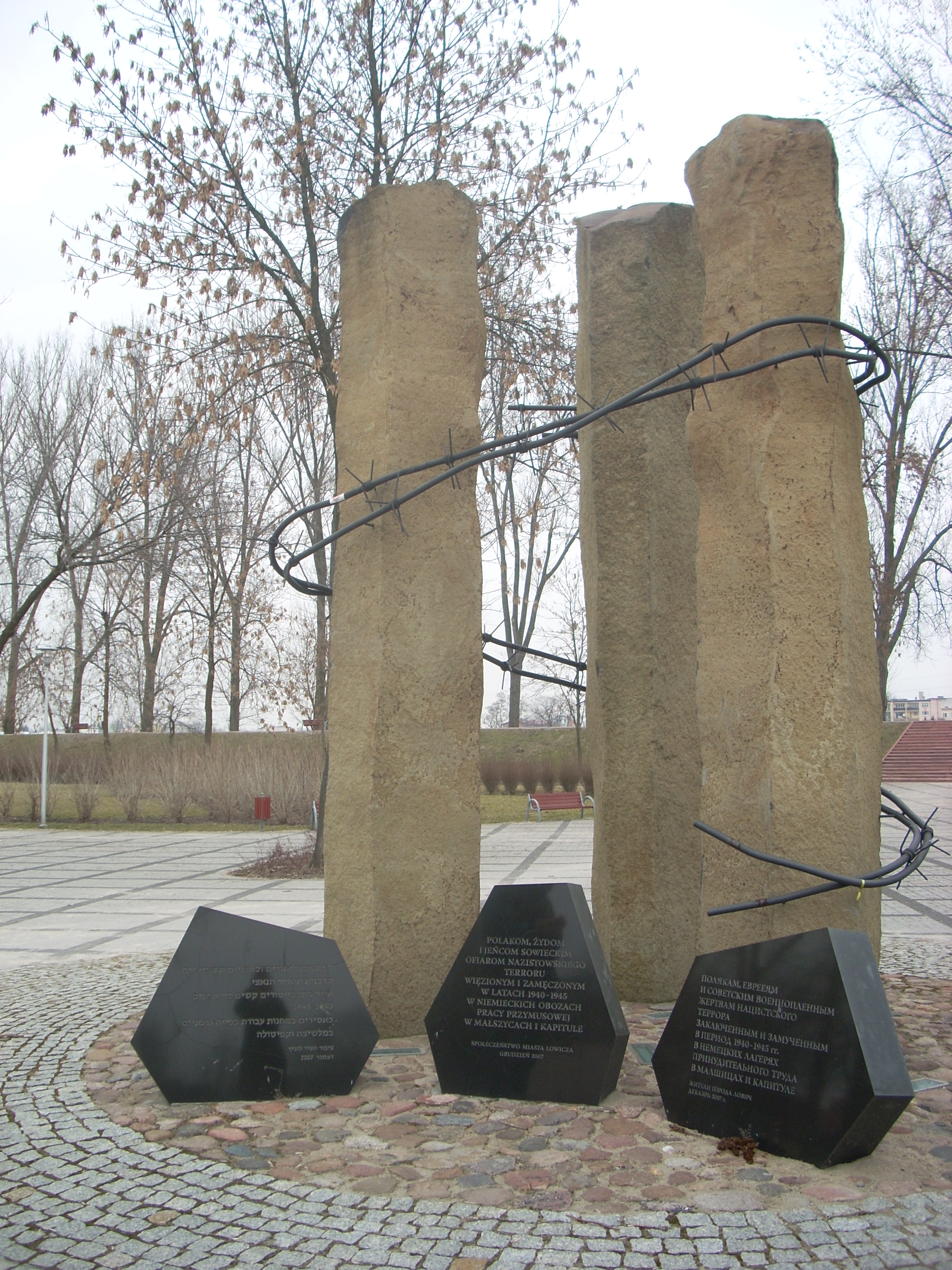
Monument to Poles, Jews and Soviet prisoners of war, imprisoned and killed in a local German forced labour camp

During the German invasion of Poland, which started World War II, the Battle of Bzura took place in the area of the town. Germany carried out several air raids on Łowicz on September 3–6, 1939, damaging many buildings and killing hundreds of civilians. The town was captured by the Wehrmacht on September 8, 1939, to be recaptured by the Polish Army three days later. Between September 14–16, the town changed hands three times. Finally, Polish forces abandoned Łowicz in the night of September 16/17, 1939. German occupation of Łowicz lasted until January 17, 1945. Over 5,000 inhabitants were killed during the war.

In 1940, during the Nazi Occupation of Poland, German authorities established a Jewish ghetto in Łowicz, in order to confine its Jewish population for the purpose of persecution and exploitation. The ghetto was liquidated in March 1941, when all its 8,000–8,200 inhabitants were transported in cattle trucks to Warsaw Ghetto, the largest ghetto in all of Nazi occupied Europe with over 400,000 Jews crammed into an area of 1.3 square miles (3.4 km^{2}). From there, most victims were sent to Treblinka extermination camp.

During the Warsaw Uprising, in August–September 1944, the Germans deported several thousands of Varsovians from the Dulag 121 camp in Pruszków, where they were initially imprisoned, to Łowicz. These Poles were mainly old people and women with children, many were sent to nearby villages, while over 3,400 stayed in the town as of mid-November 1944.

=== Recent period ===
From 1975 to 1998, it was administratively located in Skierniewice Voivodeship. Łowicz was visited by Pope John Paul II in 1999. In 2012, due to its historical, artistic, material and spiritual values, the Cathedral Basilica complex was listed by the President of Poland as a Historic Monument of Poland.

== Points of interest ==
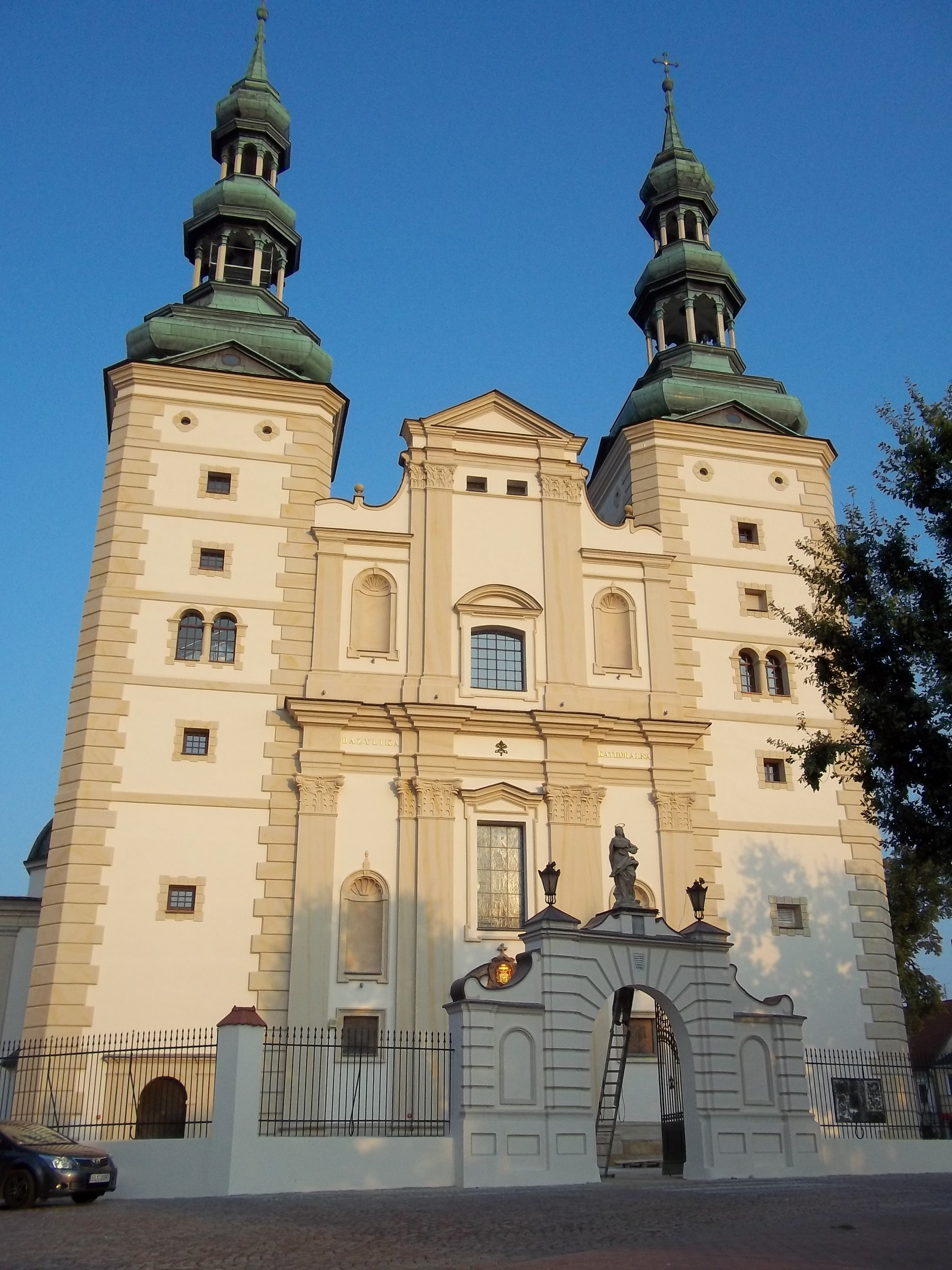
Cathedral Basilica of the Assumption of the Blessed Virgin Mary

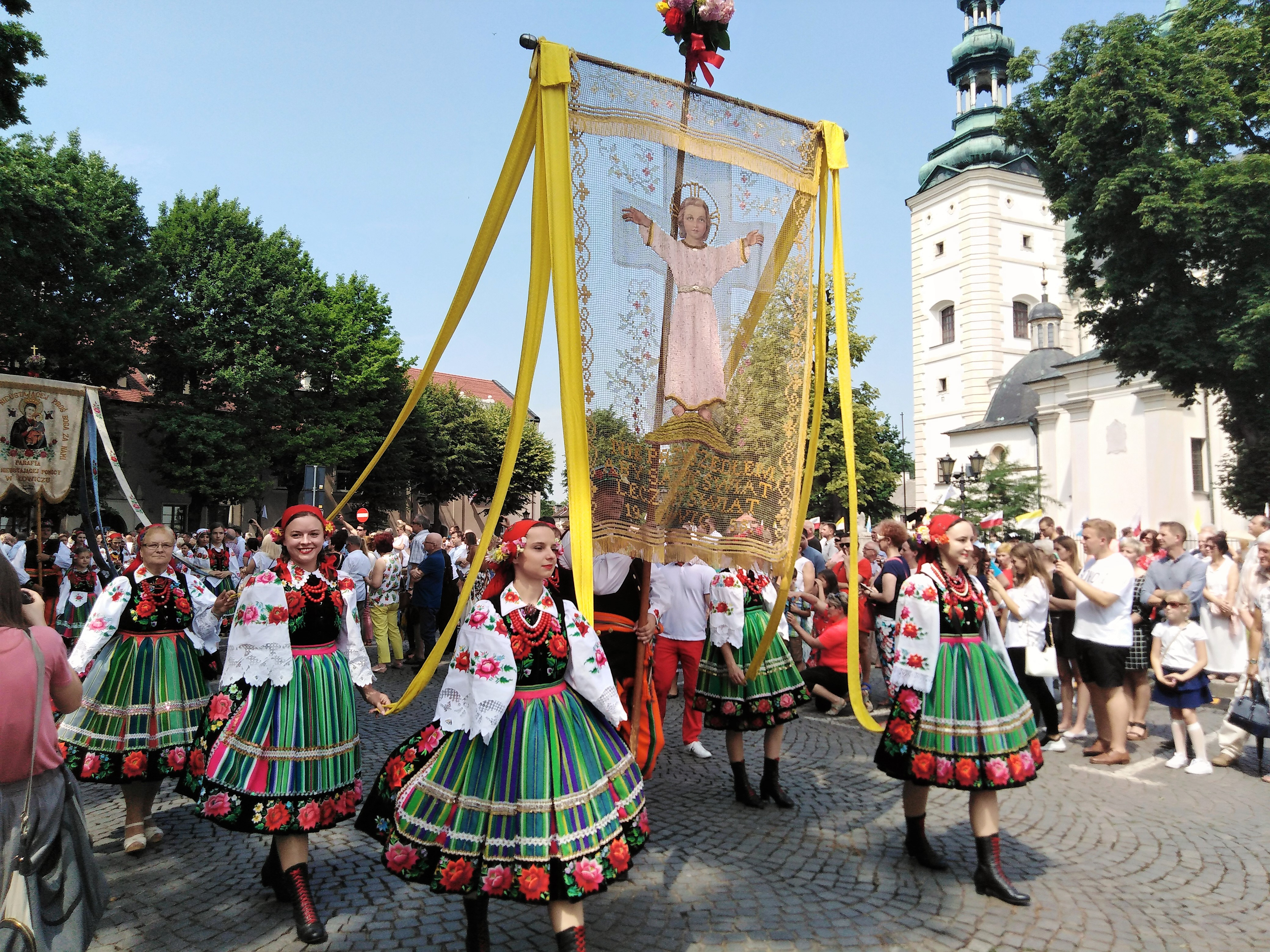
Corpus Christi procession (2019)

- Baroque Cathedral Basilica of the Assumption of the Blessed Virgin Mary, built in the first half of the 17th century by Italian architect Tomas Poncino. A former residential church of the archbishops of Gniezno and Primates of Poland, and burial place of a dozen archbishops of Gniezno and Primates of Poland. Partially destroyed in 1939, the complex was rebuilt in 1949. It is listed as a Historic Monument of Poland,
- Baroque Piarist Church of Our Lady of Graces and Adalbert of Prague (1672–80), with a Rococo façade,
- Baroque Bernardine Church of the Immaculate Conception and Saint Elisabeth,
- former Evangelist church (1838–39), now an art gallery
- Neo-Gothic Mariavite Church (1910),
- Neoclassical town hall (1825–28), designed by Bonifacy Witkowski, with a plaque commemorating 5,808 inhabitants of Łowicz murdered by the Germans during World War II, and plaques commemorating visits of Tadeusz Kościuszko (in 1790) and Pope John Paul II (in 1999)
- Baroque complex of missionaries, built in the early 18th century by Tylman van Gameren, today housing the Museum in Łowicz
- Holy Spirit Church, built in the early 15th century in Gothic style, and rebuilt/remodelled several times,
- General Stanisław Klicki's Tower,
- monument to the Sons of Łowicz Land, Fighters for Polish Independence at the Rynek (market square),
- monuments to Józef Piłsudski, Tadeusz Kościuszko and Pope John Paul II,
- former Bernardine monastery, today a Pedagogical College,
- ruins of a Gothic castle of Primates of Poland, built in ca. 1355 by Archbishop Jaroslaw of Bogoria and Skotniki. The complex was ransacked and destroyed by Swedish invaders in 1655,
- Saxon Garden,
- house at Rynek 3, where Napoleon stayed in 1806, with a memorial plaque.

== Sports ==
Łowicz has a football team called Pelikan Łowicz, who languish in the lower divisions of the Polish leagues, and Księżak Łowicz - basketball team.

== Arts and culture ==
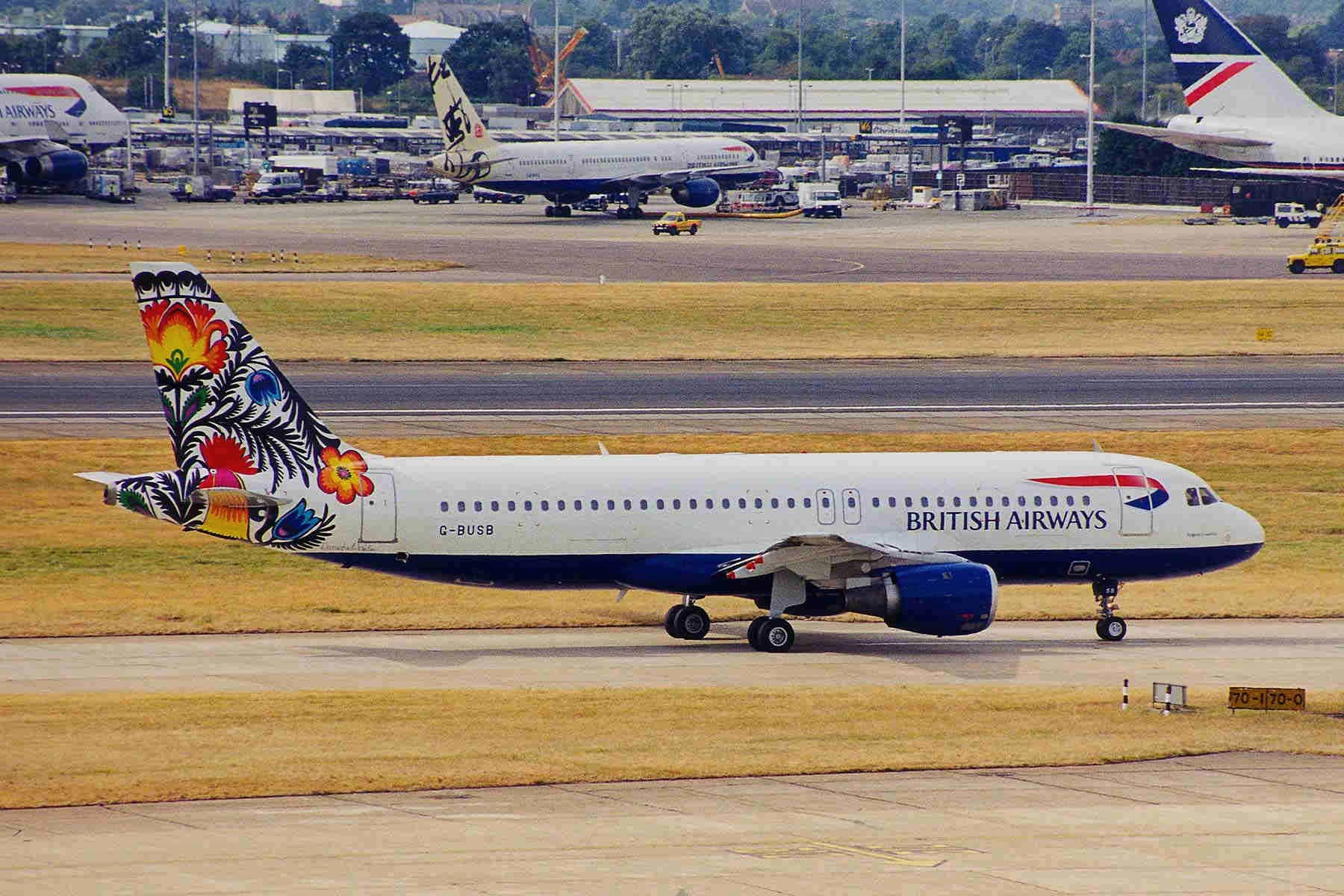
British Airways Utopia livery Cockerel of Łowicz

The Encyclopedia of Cultures and Daily Life (1999) via Gale Research cited Lowicz, Poland as known for its rainbow-colored cloth as part of folk art throughout Poland which includes pottery, glass, regional costumes, and paper cutouts.

== Notable people ==
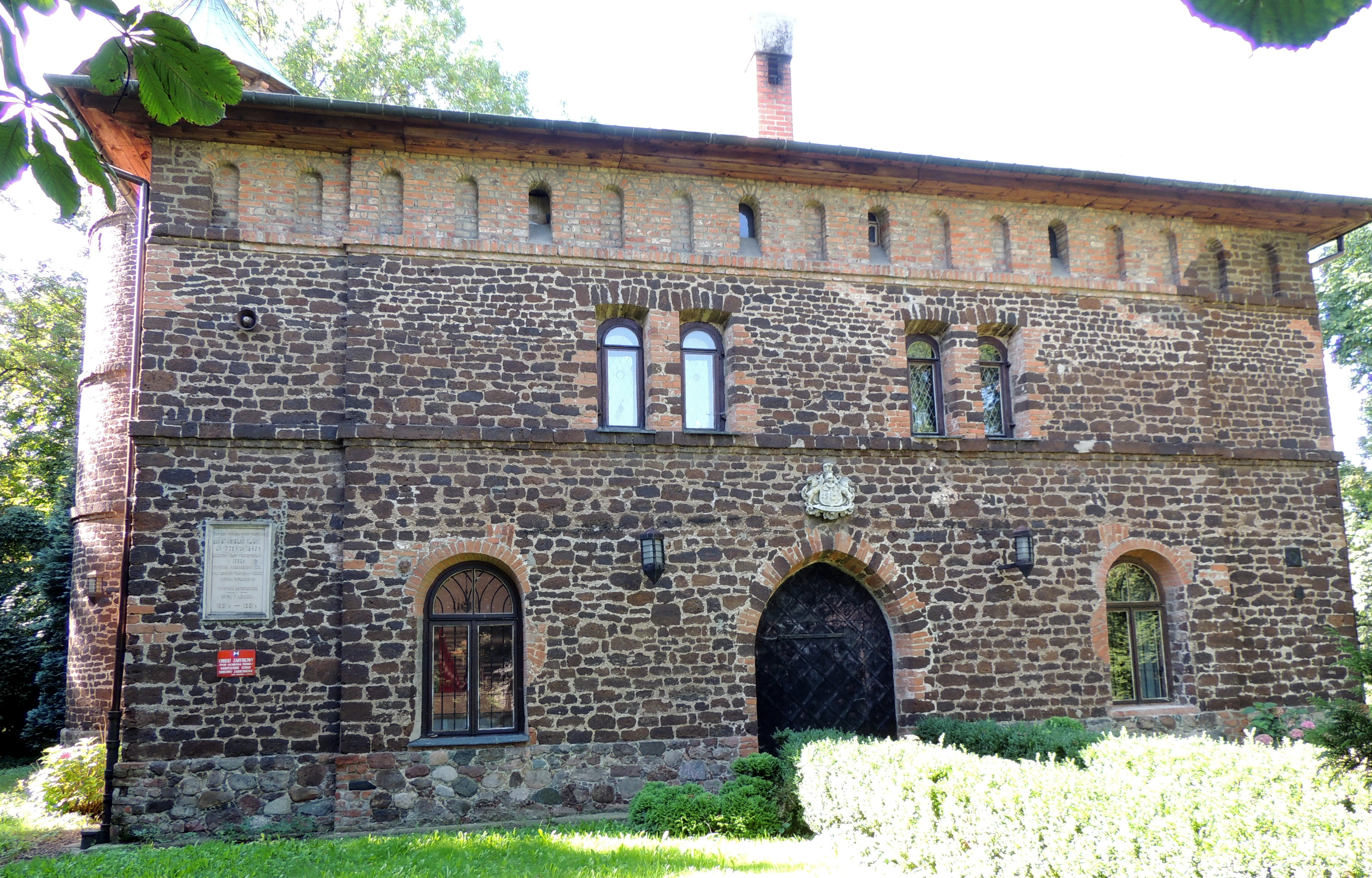
Former home of General Stanisław Klicki

- Stanisław Klicki (1775–1847), Polish general and aristocrat, participant of the Kościuszko and November Uprisings
- Mirosław Szonert (1926–1995), film and television actor
- Daniel Olbrychski (born 1945), film and theatre actor
- Jerzy Jarniewicz (born 1958), poet, literary critic, translator and essayist, winner of 2022 Nike Award
- Maciej Rybus (born 1989), Polish professional football player
- Przemysław Płacheta (born 1998), Polish professional football player

== International relations ==
=== Twin towns — Sister cities ===
Łowicz is twinned with:

- Cheektowaga, Erie County, NY, United States
- Colditz, Saxony, Germany
- Lubliniec, Silesian Voivodeship, Poland
- Montoire-sur-le-Loir, Loir-et-Cher, Centre-Val de Loire, France
- Reda, Pomeranian Voivodeship, Poland
- Šalčininkai, Lithuania
- Taksony, Hungary

== See also ==
- Agros Nova for information on the brand Łowicz and the factory
