= Agros Nova =

Polish company

Agros Nova is a company in Poland specializing in juices, processed fruit and vegetable products. Brands include Łowicz, Fortuna, Fortuna Karotka, Krakus, Tarczyn and Kotlin. Agros Nova Sp. z o.o. was founded in 2000 and is based in Warsaw after being spun off from Agros Holding S.A., a Joint Stock Company founded in 1990.

Between 2000 and 2001 the company narrowed its product range from 600 to approximately 200 items while marketing and distribution expenditures were increased. Agros Fortuna and its brands became the largest producer of jams and tomato preserves and the second largest producer of juices, drinks and nectars. In March 2002 a new company, Agros Fortuna Sp. z o.o. (Ltd), was spun off from the Agros Holding Group including the Łowicz factory and two other processing plants in Białystok and Tarczyn.

In August 2010, Agros Nova was acquired by IK Partners. Agros Nova’s preserves and ready-made food businesses which include Lowicz, Kotlin, Krakus, Wloclawek and Fruktus brands, two factories, and related private label products sold to Maspex in July 2015.

The rest of Agros Nova, specifically its non-carbonated beverages segment including brands Fortuna, Garden and Pysio, was sold to Polmlek in 2015.

== Brands ==
=== Łowicz ===
The processing plant in Łowicz opened in 1965. In 1987 the Łódź Wine Factory was spun off from the company and a few years later the Wood Packaging Plant in Andrzejów was passed over to the Fruit and Vegetable Industry Automation Company in Bielawa.

Łowicz launched the first carrot juices in the Polish market under the brand name Karotka.

In 1995 a picnic was held to celebrate the company's 30th anniversary.

=== Fortuna ===
Fortuna is one of Agros Nova's brands. The drink beverage company was founded in 1987 with the carrot flavoured Karotka drink in a carton . The company's slogan is Full of Life. In the year 2003 the company was bought by the Agros Nova firm - the firm expanded the company's different products bringing more customers to its products.

The company slogan and television advertisement in 1999 was Karotka - Full of Life. In the year 2000 the company begun its Vegetable Mixes and started with the tomato juice flavour which was awarded the Sign of Health X in Poland . In the year 2003, the company joined the Agros Nova firm... In the same year the company also introduced the Tabasco flavour and Italian Herbs flavour which went on sale in August 2004 and improved their Mirando drinks with the glass botted 250 ml version . In the same year the company started its online website and service Fortuna. The Fortuna company the same year had also introduced their milk drinks called Frutimil.

In the year 2005, the company introduced their duo range of new flavours - by this they mixed apple and mint together and called it the Apple Mint Duo Drink, other products in the range are listed in the list below . In 2008 the company is in eighth place in The Best Non Alcoholic Drinks according to Rzeczpospolita Newspaper . In 2009, the company re introduced its Karotka juice drink with no added sugar and made five new flavours . In 2011, the company part of the Agros Nova sponsored the Polish Taniec Z Gwiazdami Dancing on Ice on TVN (Poland) television channel . In 2012, the company sponsored the Polish Mam Talent Poland's Got Talent on TVN (Poland) channel - and advertised the company between the show advertisement.

Products include:

- Fruit Drinks Flavours are : pineapple, white grapefruit, red grapefruit, apple, apple light, mandarin, multivitamin, orange, orange with bits, green grapefruit Sweetie .
- Nectar Drinks Flavours are : banana, peach, blackcurrant, plum, red grapefruit (2 Litre), apple (2 Litre), multivitamin (2 Litre) and orange (2 Litrre) .
- Drinks Flavours are : white grapes and red grapes.
- Vegetable Juices 100% Flavours are : tomato, tabasco sauce tomatoes and multi vegetable .

=== Tarczyn ===
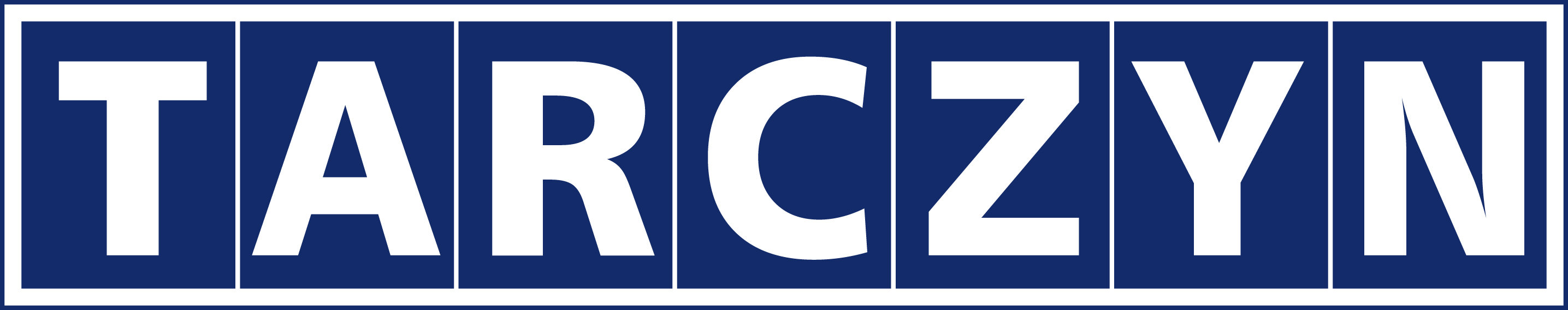
Tarczyn logo

The Tarczyn brand was established in 1967 and makes jams, juices, tinned fruit and tomato concentrates. The brand also makes meat and vegetable dishes. In 1990 it was bought by Agros Holding.

In 1967, brand Tarczyn debuted on the market with the launch of Mazovia Plants Fruit and Vegetable Industry in Tarczyn. For more than 30 years the company has sold processed fruit and vegetables, among others. Canned and frozen vegetables, tomato concentrate, vegetable and meat dishes, and jams. In 1990, brand Tarczyn becomes property of Agros Holding . In 1998, is the introduction of juices, nectars and drinks under the brand Tarczyn. In 2000, all the bottles by Tarczyn appeared with the modern metal cap called "twist-off". Tarczyn registers to the Patent Office. Brand Tarczyn becomes property of Agros Fortuna Sp. z o.o. .

In 2003, Tarczyn is bought by Agros Nova Sp. z o.o. The same year there is a television advertisement of the brand. In 2005, Tarczyn implements the new promotional campaign, which was met with a huge response from the consumers' interest. By this the fans started the Cap Collecting of the Tarczyn brand juice . In 2011, Tarczyn launched three new flavours with a smooth puree texture: strawberry with apple, mango - passion fruit, peach - guava.
