= Katowice Special Economic Zone =

Special economic zone in south-western Poland

The Katowice Special Economic Zone (Polish: Katowicka Specjalna Strefa Ekonomiczna, KSSE) is a special economic zone located in south-western Poland, in Silesian, Opole, and Lesser Poland voivodeships. It is operated by Katowicka Specjalna Strefa Ekonomiczna S.A. company from Katowice.

It has an area of 2749 ha and is scheduled to operate until 31 December 2026.

== Sources ==
- Easson, A.J. (2004). Tax Incentives for Foreign Direct Investment. Kluwer Law International. p. 189. ISBN 978-90-411-2228-5.
