= Brynów-Osiedle Zgrzebnioka =

District of Katowice

- District
- Brynów część wschodnia-Osiedle Zgrzebnioka
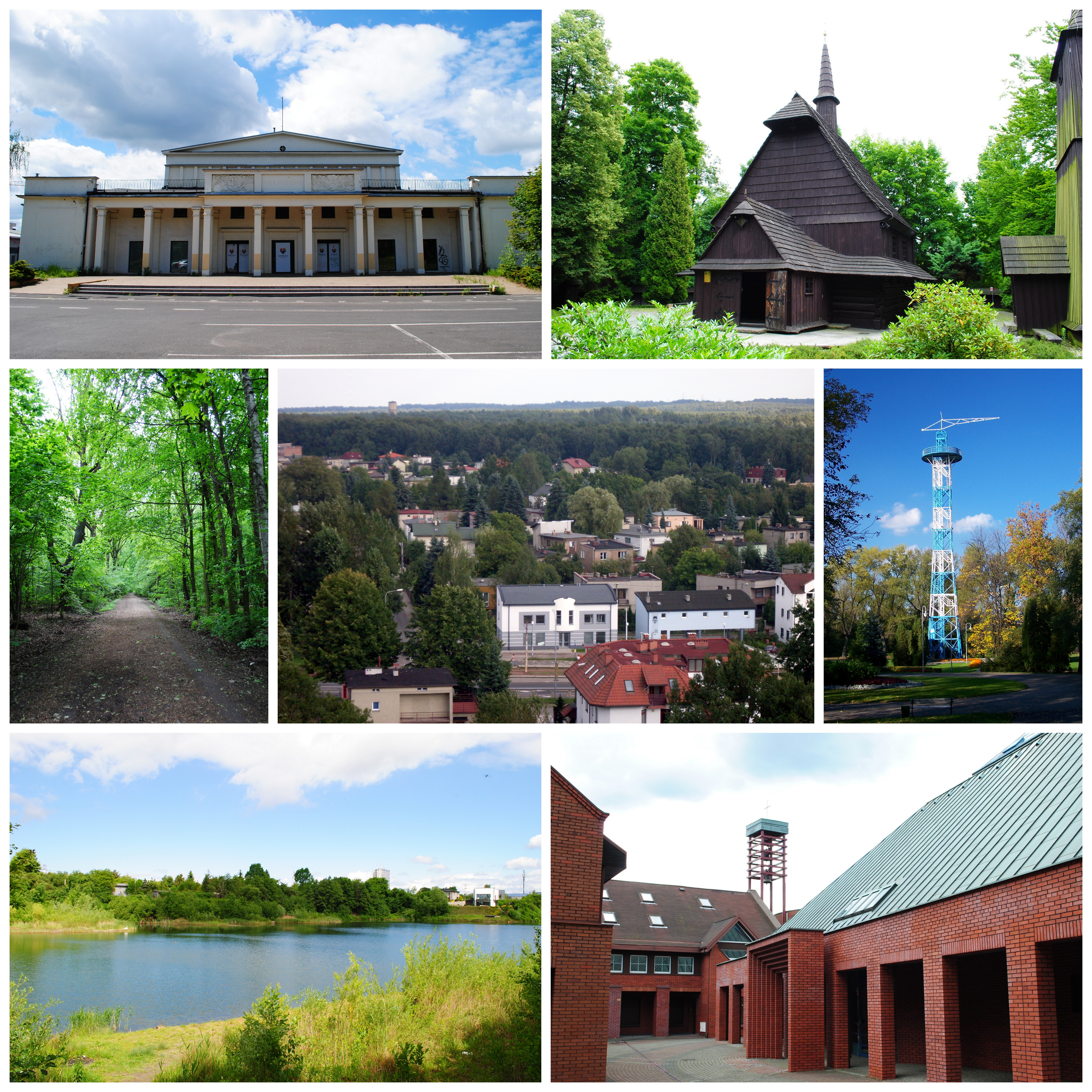
- Park Hall on Tadeusz Kościuszko Street, Church of St. Michael the Archangel in Kościuszko Park, path in Katowice Forest Park, view of the Ptasie Estate, Parachute Tower in Kościuszko Park, Grünfeld pond, Church of the Mother of the Church of the Immaculate Morning Star of Freedom on Gawronów Street in Zgrzebniok Estate

- Flag

- Location within Katowice
- Coordinates: 50°14′06″N 19°00′00″E
- Country: Poland
- Voivodeship: Silesian Voivodeship
- City: Katowice
- Date of establishment: 1 January 1992

Area
  - Total: 4.08 km^{2} (1.58 sq mi)

Population
  - Total: 6,384
  - Density: 1,565/km^{2} (4,050/sq mi)
- Area code: 32
- Vehicle registration: SK

Brynów-Osiedle Zgrzebnioka (full name: Brynów część wschodnia-Osiedle Zgrzebnioka) is a district of Katowice, located in the central part of the city, within the western district cluster. It borders four other districts: Śródmieście, Osiedle Paderewskiego – Muchowiec, Piotrowice-Ochojec, and Załęska Hałda-Brynów. This district primarily encompasses the eastern part of the historical Brynów municipality, along with the estates established within it, such as Brynów A, Ptasie, and Zgrzebnioka, as well as new housing complexes developed in the area around Ceglana and Meteorologów streets.

The first mention of Brynów dates back to 1474, and until the 19th century, it was an agricultural settlement. In 1801, the Beate coal mine was established, and in 1823, the Henriette zinc smelter was founded. With the opening of the Oheim coal mine (later known as Wujek) in 1899, the northern part of the present district, Katowicka Hałda, began to develop rapidly. In 1888, on the grounds of the former Beate mine, a new park complex was being created in a suburban forest, and between 1894 and 1895, Süd Park was established, later renamed Kościuszko Park in 1925. In 1912, the first tram arrived in the area from downtown Katowice, and in 1938, the wooden Church of St. Michael the Archangel was moved to Kościuszko Park. During the Polish People's Republic, new residential estates were built, such as Brynów A, Brynów B (Ptasie Estate), and Zgrzebniok Estate. On 5 February 1990, an ophthalmological hospital was opened in the district, and after 1989, the area around Ceglana Street became a hub for new housing investments.

Brynów-Osiedle Zgrzebnioka is a district with a dominant residential and recreational function, along with developed healthcare and administrative-office functions. It is home to one of the two facilities of the Professor Kornel Gibiński University Clinical Center in Katowice. A key cultural point in the district is Park Hall, where various concerts and events are organized, as well as Kościuszko Park, which, aside from its recreational role, serves as a venue for cultural events.

The northern boundary of the district is defined by the A4 autostrada, which is part of the European route E40, and key internal roads in the district include Mikołowska, Brynowska, and Tadeusz Kościuszko streets – the latter also hosts a tram line that connects the district with the city center. The area of the district is 4.08 km^{2}, which constitutes 2.48% of the city's total area, and at the end of 2020, it was home to 6,384 people (2.34% of Katowice's population).

== Geography ==
=== Location ===
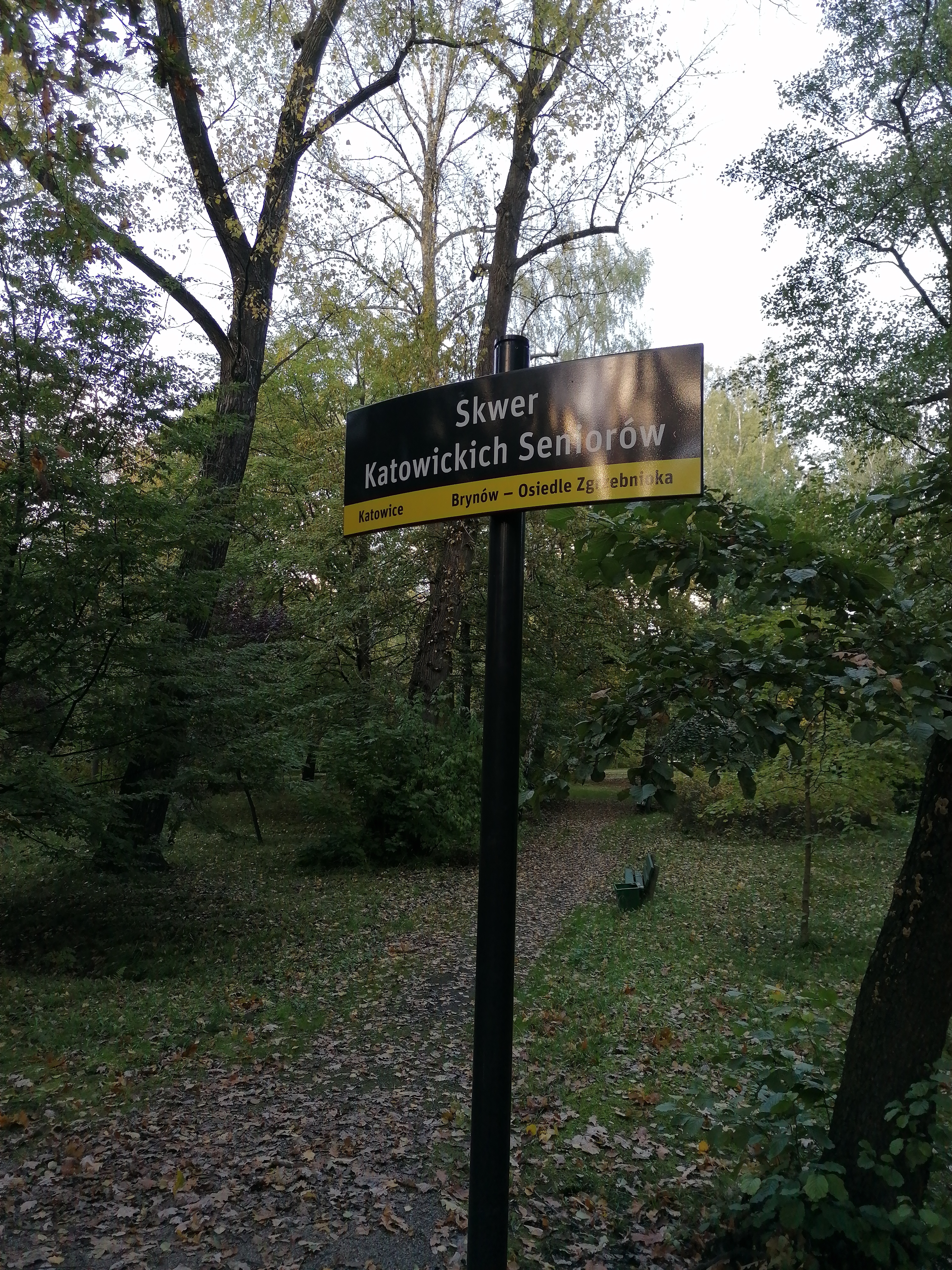
City Information System Board at the Katowice Seniors' Square with the abbreviated name of the district

Brynów-Osiedle Zgrzebnioka is one of the 22 districts of Katowice, numbered 5, and serves as an auxiliary unit of the municipality. It is located in the central part of Katowice and, together with Ligota-Panewniki and Załęska Hałda-Brynów, is part of the western district cluster. The district covers an area of 4.08 km^{2}, which constitutes 2.48% of the city's total area. It is located approximately 5.5 km from the center of Katowice.

Brynów-Osiedle Zgrzebnioka borders the following districts: to the north with Śródmieście, to the east with Osiedle Paderewskiego – Muchowiec, to the south with Piotrowice-Ochojec, and to the west with Załęska Hałda-Brynów.

The district's boundaries are as follows:

- North: along Górnośląska Avenue (A4 autostrada) between Mikołowska and Francuska streets.
- East: starting from the Górnośląska Avenue and Francuska Street intersection, the boundary runs south along the western side of Francuska Street, towards the road leading to Katowice Forest Park. The boundary then turns west and, at Gawronów Street, turns south along the eastern edge of A. Zgrzebniok Street, extending to the former Katowice Muchowiec railway station tracks.
- South: following the railway tracks of the former Katowice Muchowiec station westward to the intersection with the former sand railway line, continuing along the trace of the old railway line to the railway viaduct above T. Kościuszko Street.
- West: from the railway viaduct above T. Kościuszko Street, the boundary runs along the western edge of the street towards the north, reaching the intersection of Brynowska, Rolna, and T. Kościuszko streets. The boundary then follows the western side of Brynowska Street, enclosing the buildings on the western side of the street, continuing to Mikołowska Street, and follows its axis to the highway interchange.

According to Jerzy Kondracki's physical geography division, the area of Brynów-Osiedle Zgrzebnioka lies within the Katowice Upland mesoregion (341.13), which forms the southern part of the Silesian Upland macroregion. The Silesian Upland is part of the Silesian-Kraków Upland subprovince.

Historically, the district is situated in the eastern part of Upper Silesia.

=== Geology ===
The area of Brynów-Osiedle Zgrzebnioka is situated in the Upper Silesian Basin, with a structural formation of a horst. During the transition from the Devonian to the Carboniferous period, the Paleozoic substrate of the Silesian Upland was disturbed by the formation of a depression, which during the Carboniferous period was filled with deposits that are now transformed into conglomerates, sandstones, and shales containing bituminous coal seams. Underneath the Quaternary deposits, the substrate formed from this period makes up part of the district located to the north of Drozdów Street. The surface deposits are similar, except for the Katowice Forest Park area and the Muchowiec Street region. There, outcrops of Orzesze layers (Westphalian B) are found, consisting of powerful series primarily of shales with intercalations of sandstones, siderites, and coal, with the thickness of this series exceeding 900 meters. A characteristic feature of these layers is the presence of clayey shale beds, up to several tens of meters thick, which are suitable for producing building ceramics.

During the Tertiary period, the main landforms of Brynów-Osiedle Zgrzebnioka were formed. This period involved intense chemical weathering and denudation processes. The development of landforms was significantly influenced by the Miocene phase of tectonic movements related to the Alpine orogeny. At this time, the Silesian-Kraków anticline was fractured, creating, among other features, the Kłodnica river basin. These basins, depressions, and low horsts were covered by Miocene sea sediments: marl and sandy clays as well as sands (including pebbles from Carboniferous rocks, including coal). The deposits from this period, beneath the Quaternary layers, cover areas of the district south of Drozdów Street, with Carboniferous and Miocene deposits separated in this region by a tectonic fault. Miocene surface deposits do not occur.

During the Quaternary, the district was likely covered twice by the Scandinavian ice sheet: during the earliest Mindel glaciation (Kraków) and again during the Riss glaciation (Middle Polish). Most of the deposits from the first glaciation were removed during the interglacial period, while the ice sheet from the Riss glaciation left behind tills found along valley depressions. These deposits cover the district south of Dworska and Drozdów streets, as well as the areas of Katowice Forest Park and Muchowiec Street. During the ongoing Holocene, there are processes of destruction and removal of Pleistocene sediment covers. Holocene river sediments stretch parallel to Szpaków Street and along the watercourse flowing south of the allotment gardens near the Grünfeld pond.

=== Soil ===
In Katowice, including the area of Brynów-Osiedle Zgrzebnioka, brown earth predominates, mainly in the leached variety, typical of tills or weathered Carboniferous formations. In terms of soil quality classification, most of the district's soils are classified as grade IV. Additionally, there are small enclaves of grade III soils, though these are not used for agriculture.

The soils in the district are subject to intense anthropogenic pressure, and in many cases, they have lost their utility due to mechanical transformations. Land leveling processes are prevalent, particularly in river valleys intended for future developments. These activities often destroy soil profiles and the humus layer.

=== Topography ===
The district of Brynów-Osiedle Zgrzebnioka is situated on the Silesian Upland, specifically on the Bytom-Katowice Plateau, which forms part of the Katowice Upland mesoregion (341.13). Morphologically, the district lies within the Kochłowice Hills, a latitudinal ridge divided by valleys into four isolated hills, one of which is located within the district. These hills feature domed, occasionally flattened summits and are underlain by Carboniferous strata.

The highest elevation in the district is Beata Hill, which reaches over 323.0 meters above sea level, as recorded on a 1992 topographic map. It is located on the edge of Kościuszko Park, near the intersection of T. Kościuszko and A. Zgrzebniok streets. Another notable elevation is the hill near the Brynów power substation on Brynowska Street, with a peak height exceeding 305 meters above sea level. The district's lowest point is near the boundary with the Osiedle Paderewskiego – Muchowiec district, along Muchowiec Street, where elevations drop below 280 meters above sea level. The height difference between the district's highest and lowest points is approximately 40 meters.

Additional notable elevations include Meteorologów Street near the garrison cemetery at 300.1 meters above sea level, the intersection of Parkowa and Mikołowska streets near the Wujek mine administrative colony at 305 meters, the intersection of T. Kościuszko and Słowików streets in central Brynów at 289.0 meters, and the intersection of Drozdów and A. Zgrzebniok streets on the edge of the Ptasie Estate at 295.2 meters above sea level.

The present-day topography of Brynów-Osiedle Zgrzebnioka has been significantly shaped by the Mindel glaciation and the maximum stage of the Riss glaciation. More recently, human activities, particularly settlement and mining, have profoundly influenced the area's morphogenetic development. These processes have led to the destruction of natural substrates and the creation of new forms of landform degradation. A significant portion of the district now consists of anthropogenic leveled surfaces.

=== Waters ===
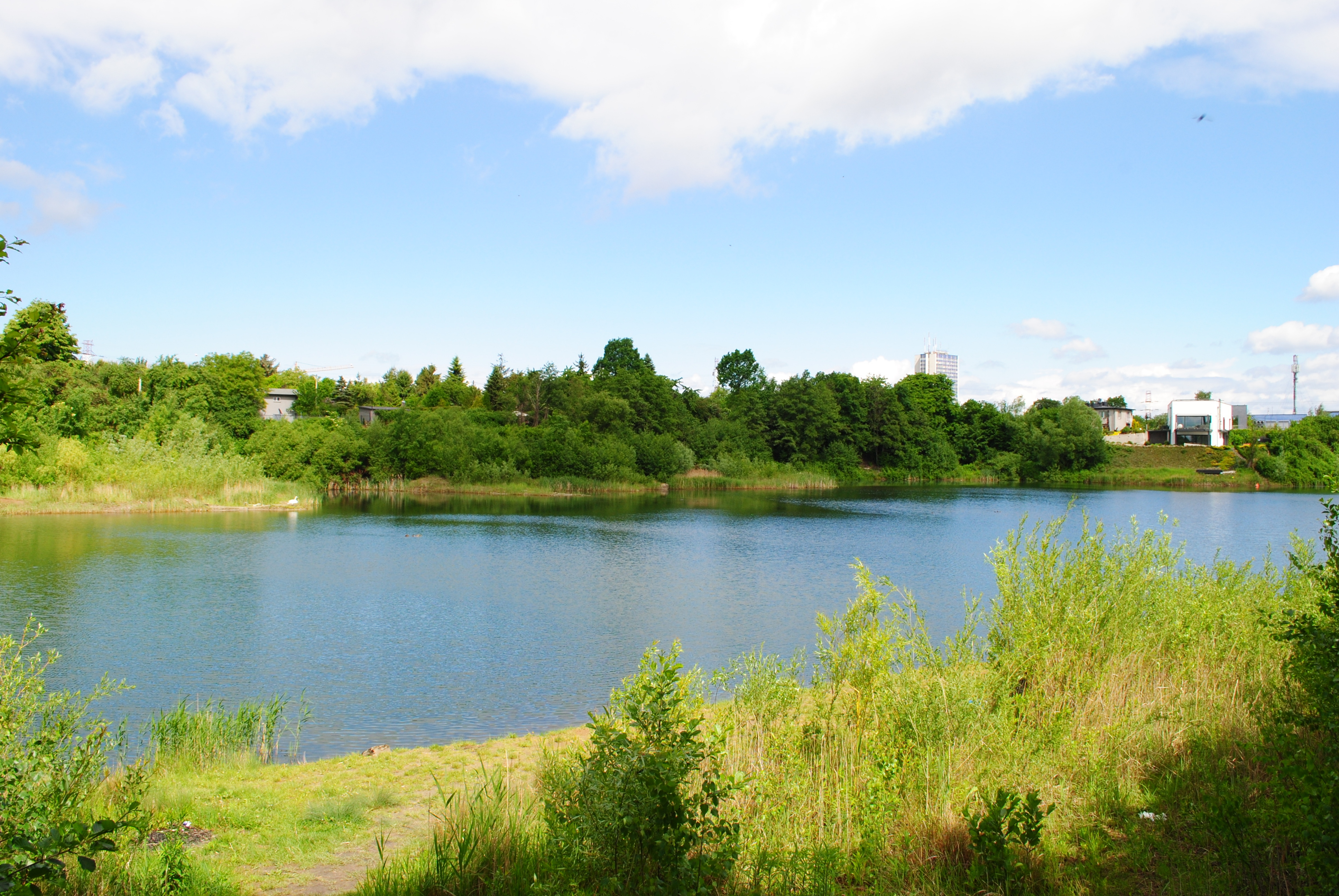
Fragment of the Grünfeld pond (view from the south-east)

The area of Brynów-Osiedle Zgrzebnioka lies within the watersheds of the Vistula and Oder rivers. A primary first-order drainage divide dividing these basins crosses the district from the west near the intersection of Mikołowska and Parkowa streets. From there, it heads eastward through Kościuszko Park, cutting across Beata Hill, and continues southeast toward the former Katowice Muchowiec station.

The northeastern part of the district, including Katowicka Hałda, the northern part of Kościuszko Park, the A. Zgrzebniok Estate, and areas around Ceglowa Street, belongs to the Vistula river basin. The first two areas fall within the Rawa river catchment, while the others are part of the Potok Leśny catchment. These two catchments are separated by a fifth-order drainage divide, but neither river flows directly through the district. Within the Potok Leśny catchment, there are two notable water bodies. One is a pond located in a landlocked area near Ceglowa Street, adjacent to the Ceglana Park residential complex. The second is Grünfeld pond, situated southeast of the first. Covering an area of over 4 hectares with a depth reaching up to 20 meters, it is fed by natural groundwater that emerges due to the intersection of aquifers during clay extraction. This pond is privately owned.

The remainder of the district lies within the Oder river basin, specifically in the Kłodnica river catchment. Although the Kłodnica river does not flow directly through the district, notable water bodies in this catchment include a pond near the Wyzwolenie Allotment Gardens on Brynowska Street and another pond near the intersection of Wróbli and Kawek streets.

=== Climate and topoclimate ===
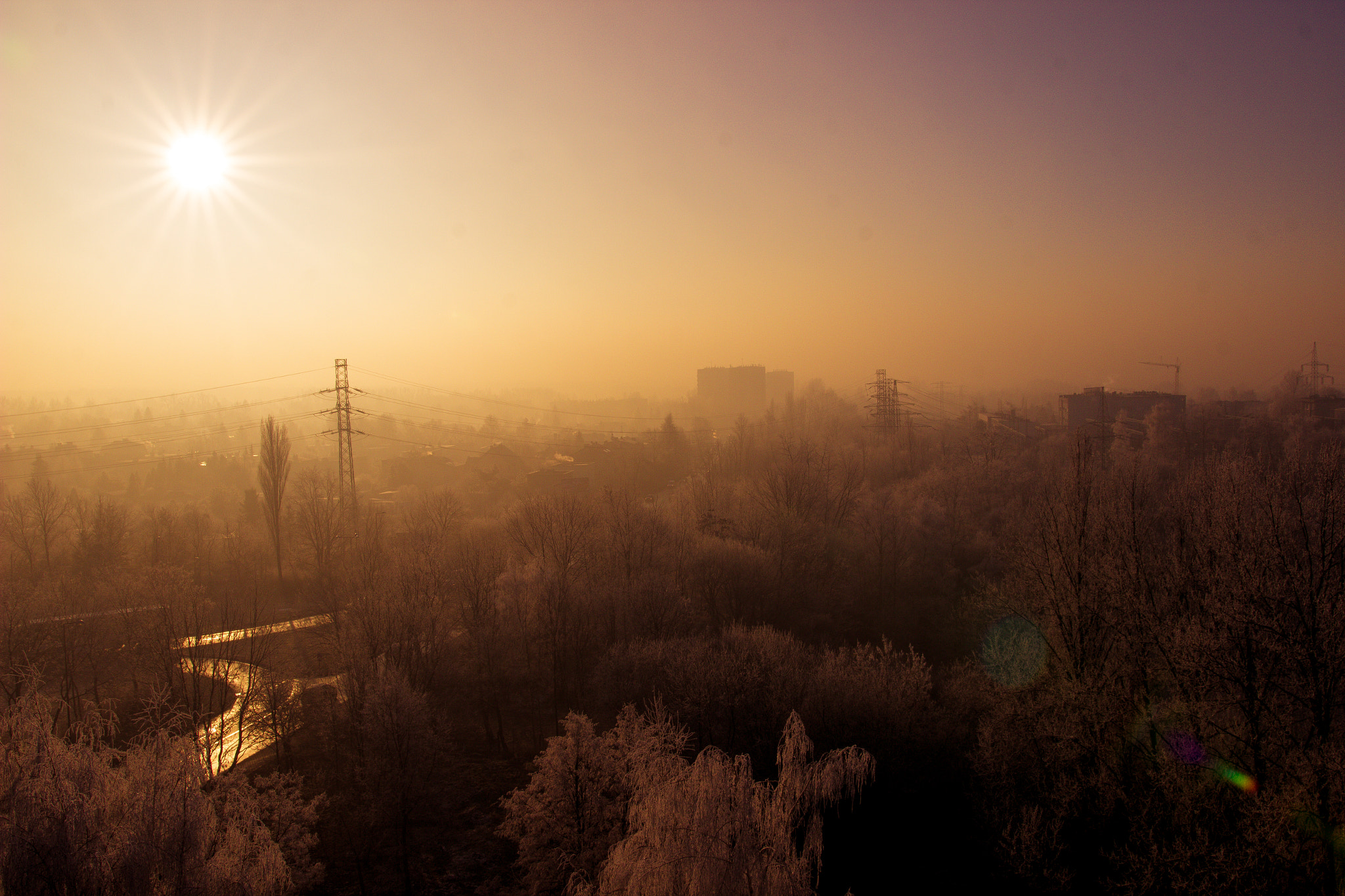
Section of the district near Brynowska Street (view to the south)

The climate of Brynów-Osiedle Zgrzebnioka is similar to that of the entire city of Katowice, influenced by both regional climate-forming factors and local conditions. Oceanic influences play a more significant role than continental ones, although tropical air masses occasionally reach the area from the southwest via the Moravian Gate.

For the neighboring Muchowiec weather station, the average annual temperature for the period from 1961 to 2005 was 8.1 °C. July was the warmest month (17.8 °C), and January the coldest (−2.2 °C). Average annual sunshine duration between 1966 and 2005 was 1,474 hours, with an average cloud cover of 5.3. Annual precipitation averaged 713.8 mm between 1951 and 2005. Snow cover typically lasts between 60 and 70 days, and the growing season averages from 200 to 220 days. Winds are predominantly from the west (20.7%) and southwest (20.4%), while northern winds are the least common (5.7%). The average wind speed is 2.4 m/s.

The local climate of Brynów-Osiedle Zgrzebnioka is shaped by topoclimate factors such as land cover and proximity to river valleys. In the area running roughly along Szpaków Street towards the Kłodnica river, an unfavorable topoclimate prevails due to densely built valley floors. On clear nights, cold air stagnation zones form, with possible localized radiative-advective frost. In the higher areas of the district, conditions are moderately favorable. In densely built-up areas, human activities significantly alter the local climate, particularly by warming the atmospheric boundary layer. The compact surfaces of buildings, roads, and squares raise air temperatures but also cool rapidly at night due to radiation loss. Low humidity in these areas further hampers heat retention. In contrast, forests help mitigate nocturnal temperature drops, maintaining a more stable temperature than neighboring open surfaces.

=== Nature and environmental protection ===
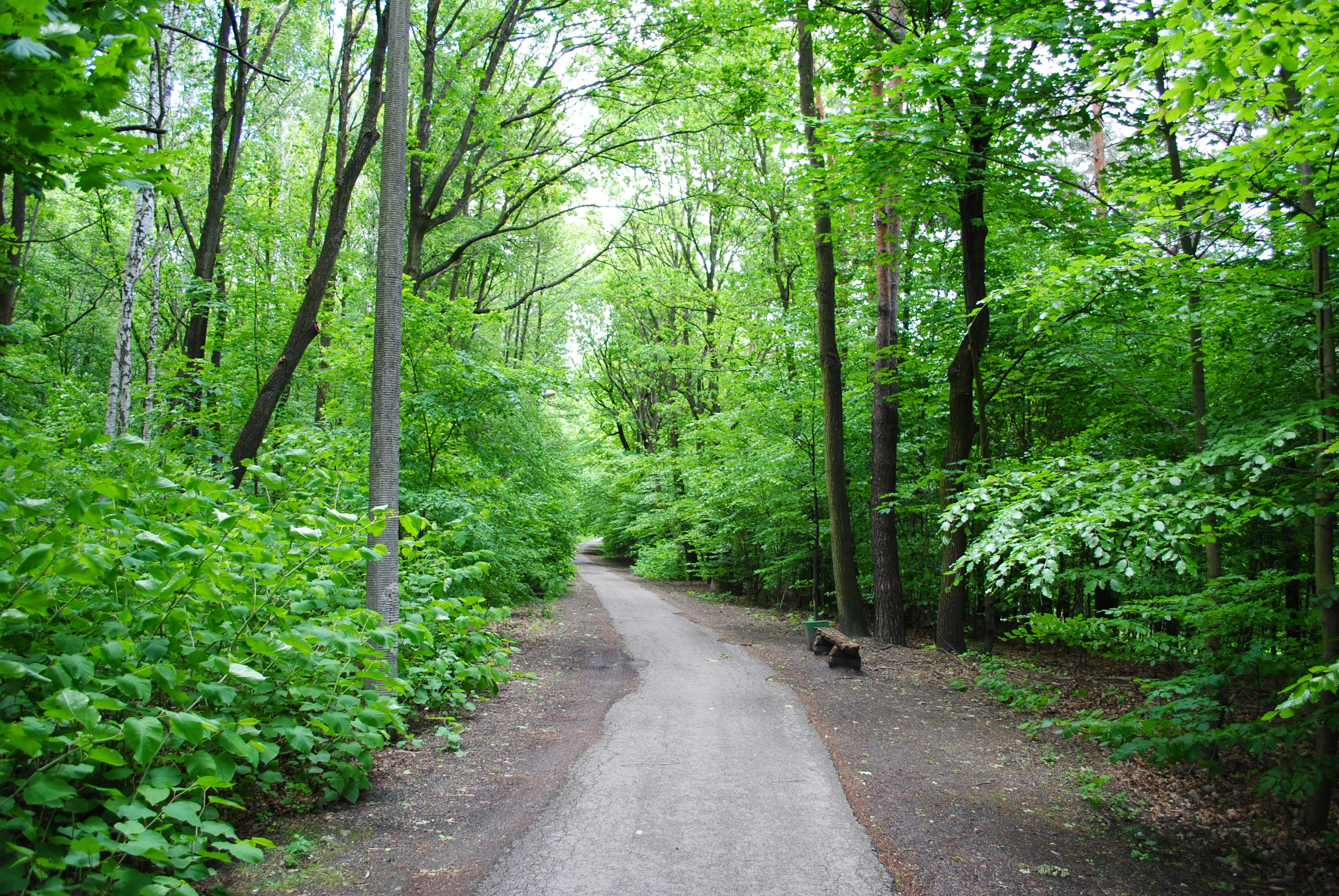
Section of the pedestrian path in the Katowice Forest Park near the Ptasie Estate

The natural vegetation of Brynów-Osiedle Zgrzebnioka developed following the last glacial period, between 12,000 and 16,000 years ago, but has faced intense human impact over the past 200 years. In the mid-12th century, the Katowice area was nearly uninhabited and covered by forests that were part of the ancient Silesian Forest. The district's original vegetation consisted of beech and mixed oak-hornbeam forests. However, the growth of ore mining and metal smelting in the 18th and 19th centuries led to extensive deforestation, coupled with environmental degradation caused by industrialization and urbanization. Some remnants of the Silesian Forest's natural grandeur remain, such as a section of the Katowice Forest, transformed in the 19th century into Southern Park (now Kościuszko Park). In the late 20th century, Katowice Forest Park was established in Muchowiec, preserving a portion of the area's natural environment despite significant biodiversity loss in the city. The variety of plant communities in the area remains considerable.

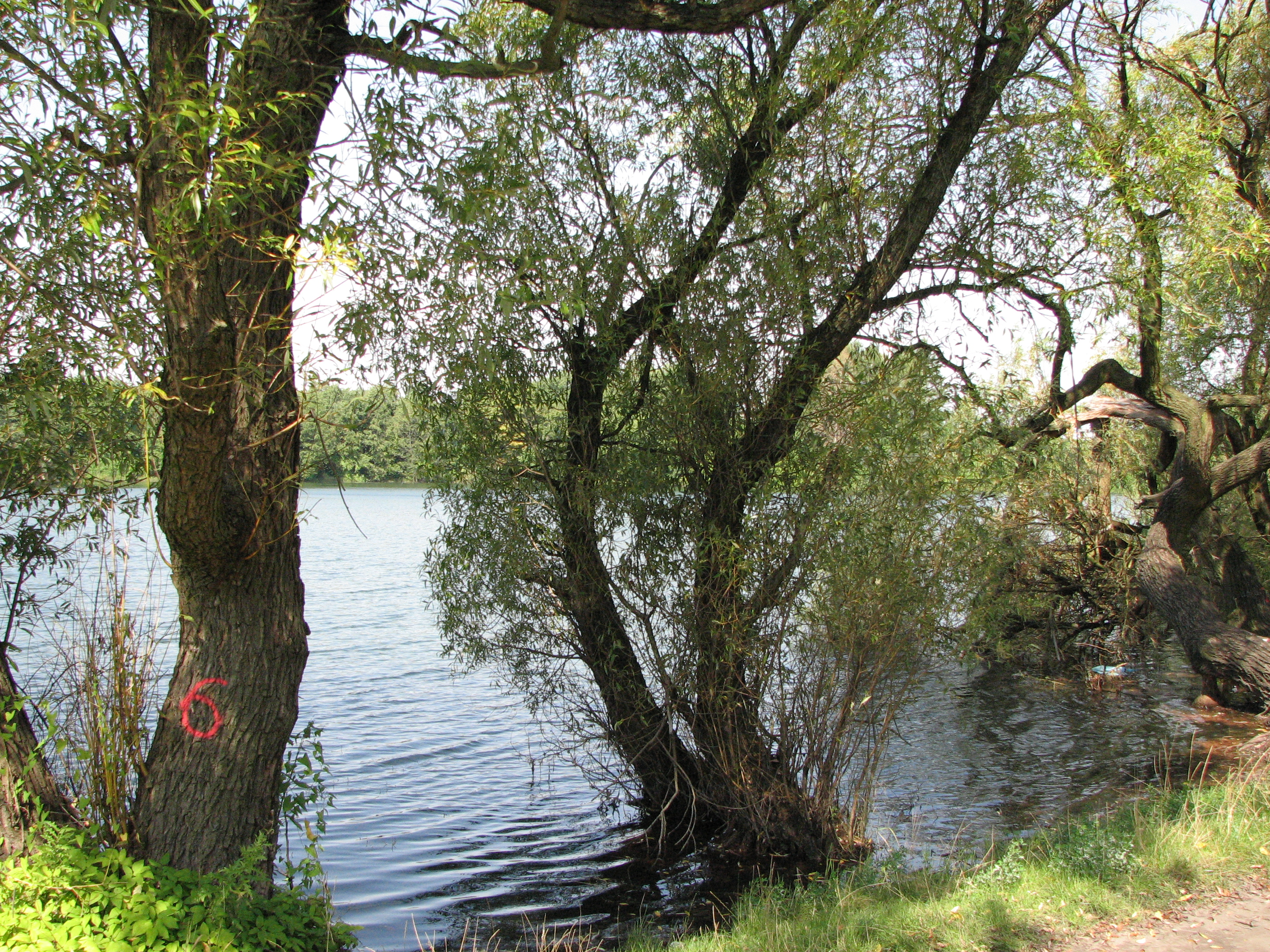
Section of shrubbery growing by the shore of Grünfeld pond

As of early 2023, there are no designated natural protection areas in the district. From 1996 to 2003, the Grünfeld pond ecological area existed, established by a resolution of the Katowice City Council on 11 March 1996 and dissolved on 22 December 2003. Situated near Bazaltowa and Krzemienna streets, Grünfeld pond was a former clay pit filled with water, surrounded by private property fences and allotment gardens. Its banks were partially covered by willow thickets and waterside vegetation, while sections of the shoreline featured reed beds with common reed and bulrush. This area provided a suitable habitat for amphibian reproduction and nesting sites for waterfowl.

Brynów-Osiedle Zgrzebnioka, together with the neighboring Osiedle Paderewskiego – Muchowiec district, features the highest proportion of organized green areas in Katowice.

In the Muchowiec area, at the border of the Brynów-Osiedle Zgrzebnioka and the Osiedle Paderewskiego – Muchowiec districts, the Katowice Forest Park is located. This extensive area, featuring ponds, parkland, and forests, is one of the most environmentally attractive places in Katowice, offering a variety of habitats that support a rich diversity of flora and fauna. The most common tree stands here are mixed oak and birch forests with an admixture of pine. In the undergrowth, along with young trees, there are also rowan, alder buckthorn, elder, and red elderberry. The groundcover is lush and floristically rich, with species such as wood horsetail, wood anemone, and King Solomon's-seal. Valleys of small streams and moist depressions are covered by patches of riparian forests. The forested areas of the Katowice Forest Park, bordering directly on streams and water bodies, are ideal for the development of amphibians and many bird species. Migratory birds, such as the common kingfisher, little ringed plover, and grey heron, have been observed here. Amphibians found in the area include the common toad, common frog, and smooth newt. Common forest birds, such as Eurasian jays, common blackbirds, thrushes, finches, tits, nuthatches, and great spotted woodpeckers, are also present. The forests are home to squirrels, and occasionally rabbits and deer. There is an abundance of mice, voles, and insectivorous species, and wild boars are spotted in the winter.

Kościuszko Park, entirely located within the boundaries of the district, is the largest park in Katowice. It is situated on the slopes of Beata Hill and is bordered by T. Kościuszko, Piękna, and Górnośląska streets. The park covers an area of 72 hectares, which accounts for 17.6% of the district's total area. It is managed by the Municipal Greenery Department of Katowice.

The origins of the park date back to 1888, when 6 hectares of suburban forest were landscaped, laying the groundwork for the park. Between 1894 and 1895, the creation of Süd Park began, during which the park's area was expanded. In 1910, the City Magistrate of Katowice provided financial support for the planting of trees along T. Kościuszko Street. In 1925, the park was named in honor of Tadeusz Kościuszko.

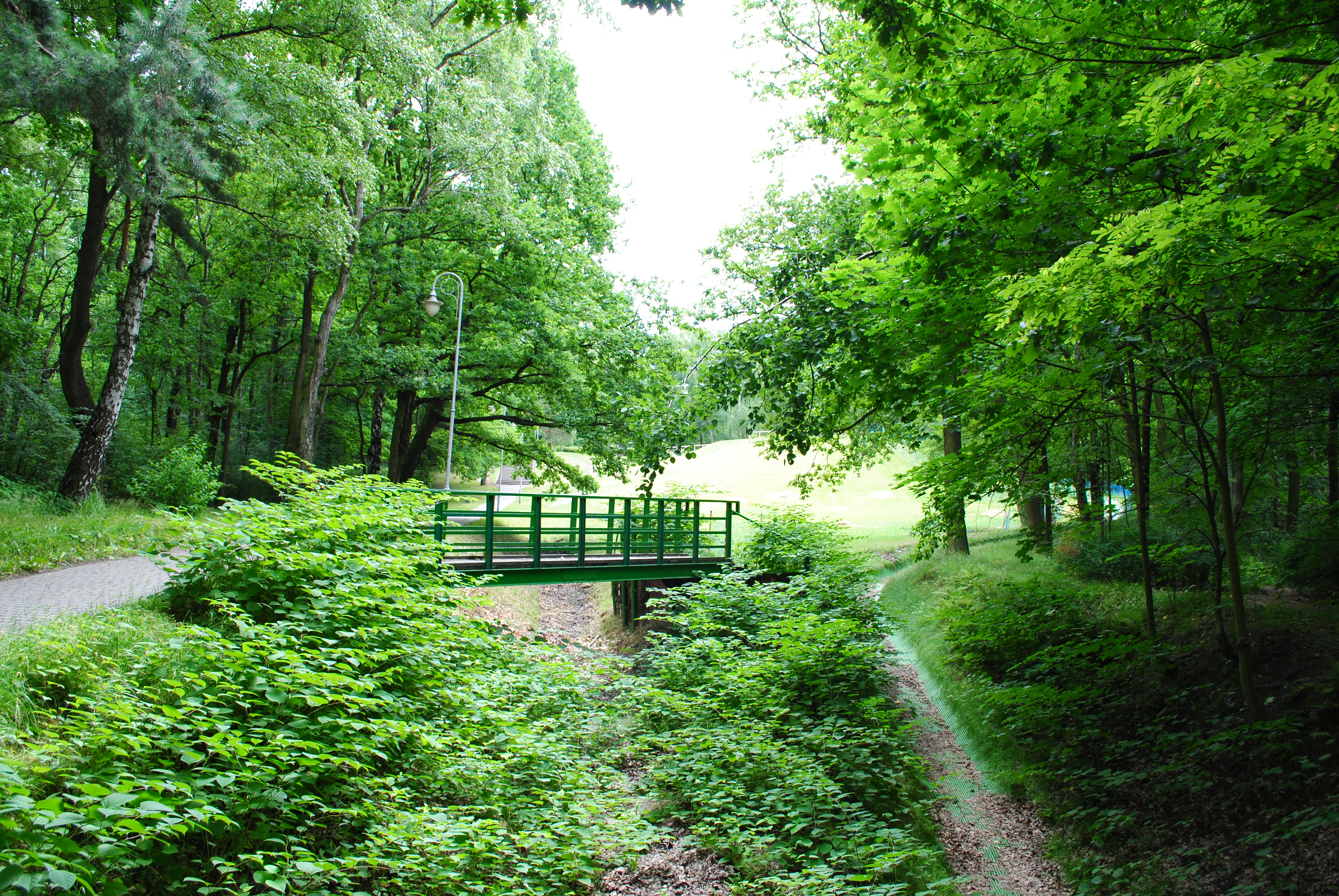
Fragment of Kościuszko Park

The layout of Kościuszko Park references English landscape gardens with influences from classical gardens in the arrangement of flower beds and floral clusters. Because the park was established on the site of a former forest, parts of its original tree cover and undergrowth have been preserved. Over 90 different species and varieties of trees and shrubs grow there, with native deciduous species – hornbeams, beeches, small-leaved limes, and Norway maples – being predominant. Notable trees include silver-trunked beeches and Japanese cherries. Among the dendrological rarities found in the park are eastern hemlock and Douglas fir.

The park serves as a refuge for various animal species, particularly birds, many of which nest there. Common species include common wood pigeons, blackbirds, fieldfares, jays, leaf warblers, starlings, nuthatches, and tits. Mammals such as squirrels, hedgehogs, and moles, as well as amphibians like common frogs and common toads, also inhabit the area.

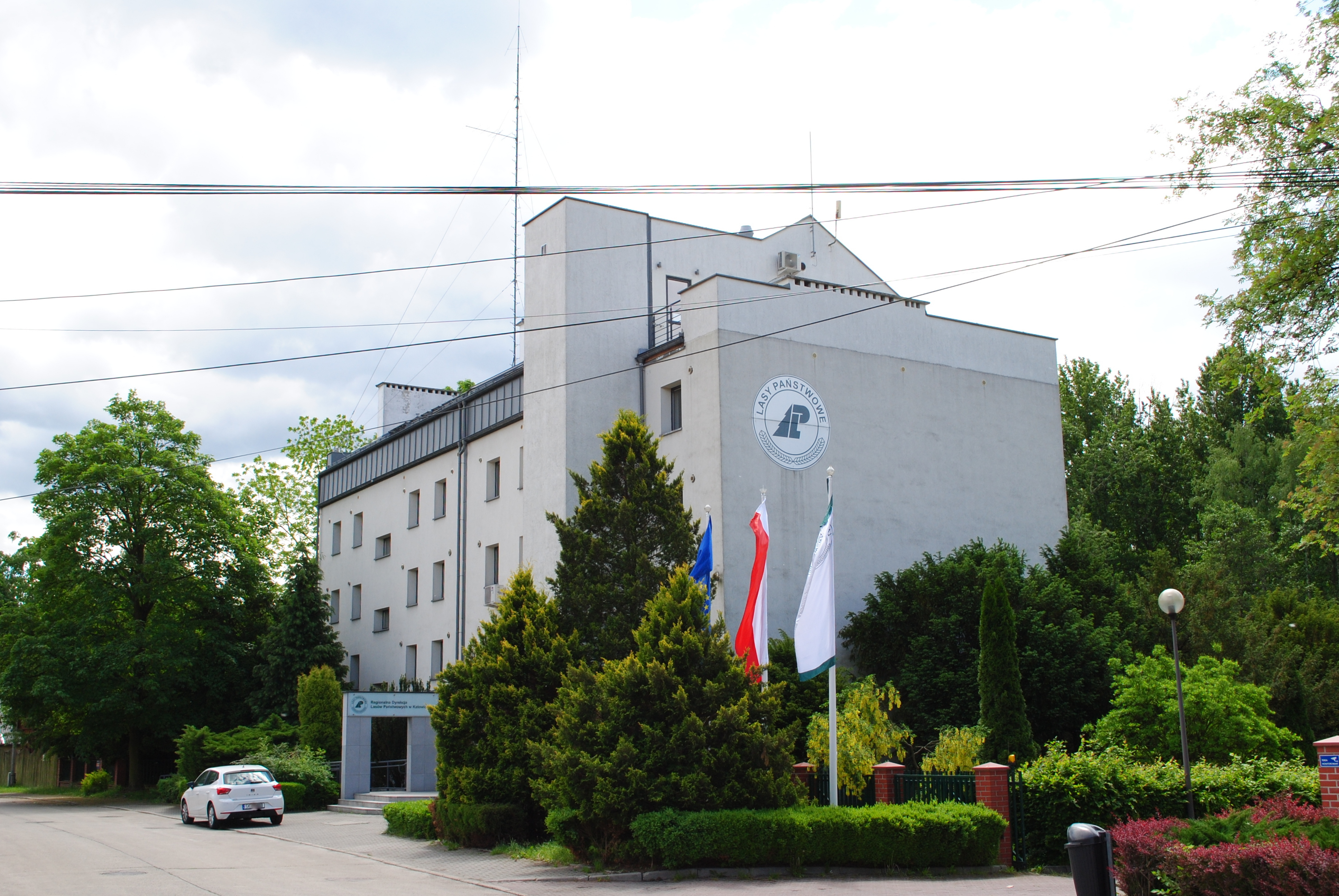
Headquarters of the Regional Directorate of State Forests and Allotments

The district is enriched by numerous allotment garden complexes, including Ligonia, Rymera, Kombatant, and Wyzwolenia, which act as reservoirs for both native and exotic flora.

Several public institutions related to nature are based within the Brynów-Osiedle Zgrzebnioka district. The Regional Directorate of State Forests and Allotments, located at 43/45 St. Hubert Street, is one of the largest of 17 such directorates in Poland, managing 10% of the country's forestry operations. It oversees 38 forest inspectorates and two fishery farms in Niemodlin and Krogulna. Established in February 1945 as the Directorate of State Forests for the Silesian Region, it managed 44 forest inspectorates by the following year.

The Municipal Greenery Department, responsible for maintaining and caring for Katowice's green spaces, is headquartered at 138 T. Kościuszko Street. Additionally, the Silesian Regional Board of the Polish Allotment Gardeners' Association is located at 1 Kormoranów Street.

== History ==
=== Until the 19th century ===
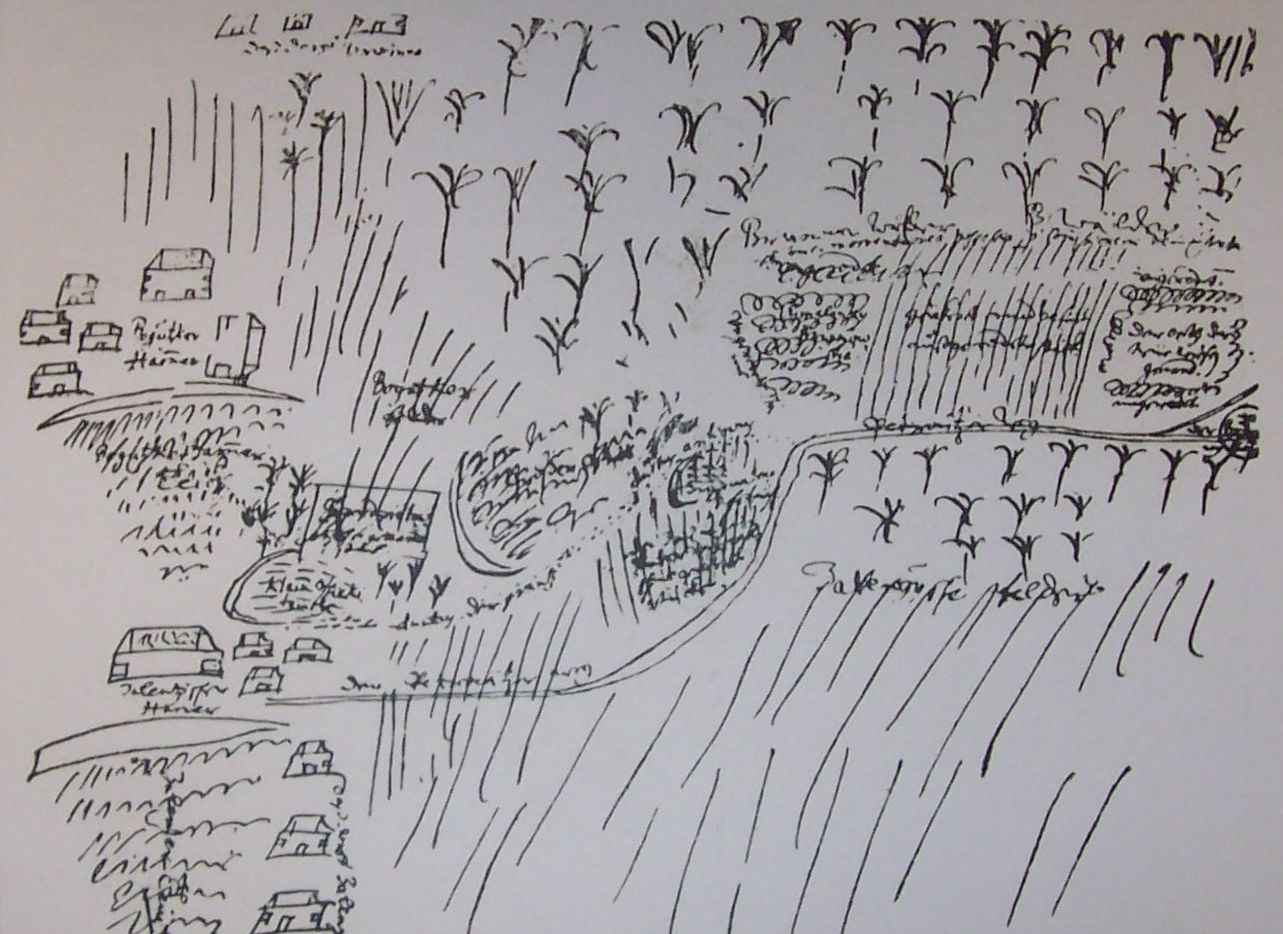
Earliest situational map of the areas now forming Katowice, dated 1686, shows Brynów as das Dorf Brwinow. The map also marks features like the Brynów Forests (Brwinowe Wälder) and Brynów hop gardens (Chmielniky Brwinowskie)

The first recorded mention of the village of Brynów (then called Brwinów), located in what is now the Brynów-Osiedle Zgrzebnioka district, dates back to 1474. This document refers to the pledging of the Mysłowice estates, including Brwinów, by Duke Wenceslaus of Rybnik to Jakub Dembiński, the voivode of Sandomierz. Over the centuries, the village passed through various owners. By the mid-19th century, it was initially owned by the Winckler and Tiele-Winckler families and later became the property of Prince Hohenlohe.

In the late 14th and early 15th centuries, Upper Silesia experienced an economic collapse, partly due to the Hussite Wars. This decline was marked by numerous deserted settlements. Brynów was first recorded as an abandoned village in 1486. However, it did not vanish entirely, as its nearby arable fields continued to be used by residents of neighboring settled villages. The process of resettlement began in the late 15th century. Even in 1609, Brynów remained uninhabited, with the first settlers' names appearing only in documents from the 17th century. Brynów is marked on one of the oldest maps of modern Katowice, dated around 1686. This hand-drawn map was created during a legal dispute over logging rights in forests belonging to Kuźnica Bogucka.

Muchowiec was established in the 17th century as a hamlet of Katowice. At the turn of the 19th and 20th centuries, worker housing was built in the vicinity of Ceglana Street in Muchowiec, primarily for laborers employed in the local brickyards. Katowicka Hałda, on the other hand, emerged in the mid-18th century. Until 1865, it remained a hamlet of Katowice before being incorporated into the newly established Brynów municipality.

In the area of present-day Katowice, agriculture and forestry were the primary sources of livelihood for the population until the end of the 18th century. According to the Carolingian Cadastre from 1723 to 1725, Brynów had nine smallholdings, though by the mid-18th century, this number had decreased to five, all of which were cottage farms.

The compact layout of Brynów village developed during the 18th and 19th centuries along streets such as Dworska and Brynowska, now part of the district. Around the same period, likely in the 18th century, a road was constructed connecting the then village of Katowice with Brynów. This route, now T. Kościuszko Street, became an essential transportation artery by the 19th century. It was planned with precision, featuring no bends from the center of Katowice to the current intersection with Dworska Street, near which the Brynów manor farm was located.

=== 19th century ===
In the 19th century, Brynów transformed from an agricultural village into an industrial settlement due to the development of coal mining and brickworks. In 1801, the Beate coal mine was established in Brynów, and on 29 April 1823, a zinc smelter, Henriette, was founded in the area of the present district. In the early 19th century, several brickworks also began to be established in the Brynów region.

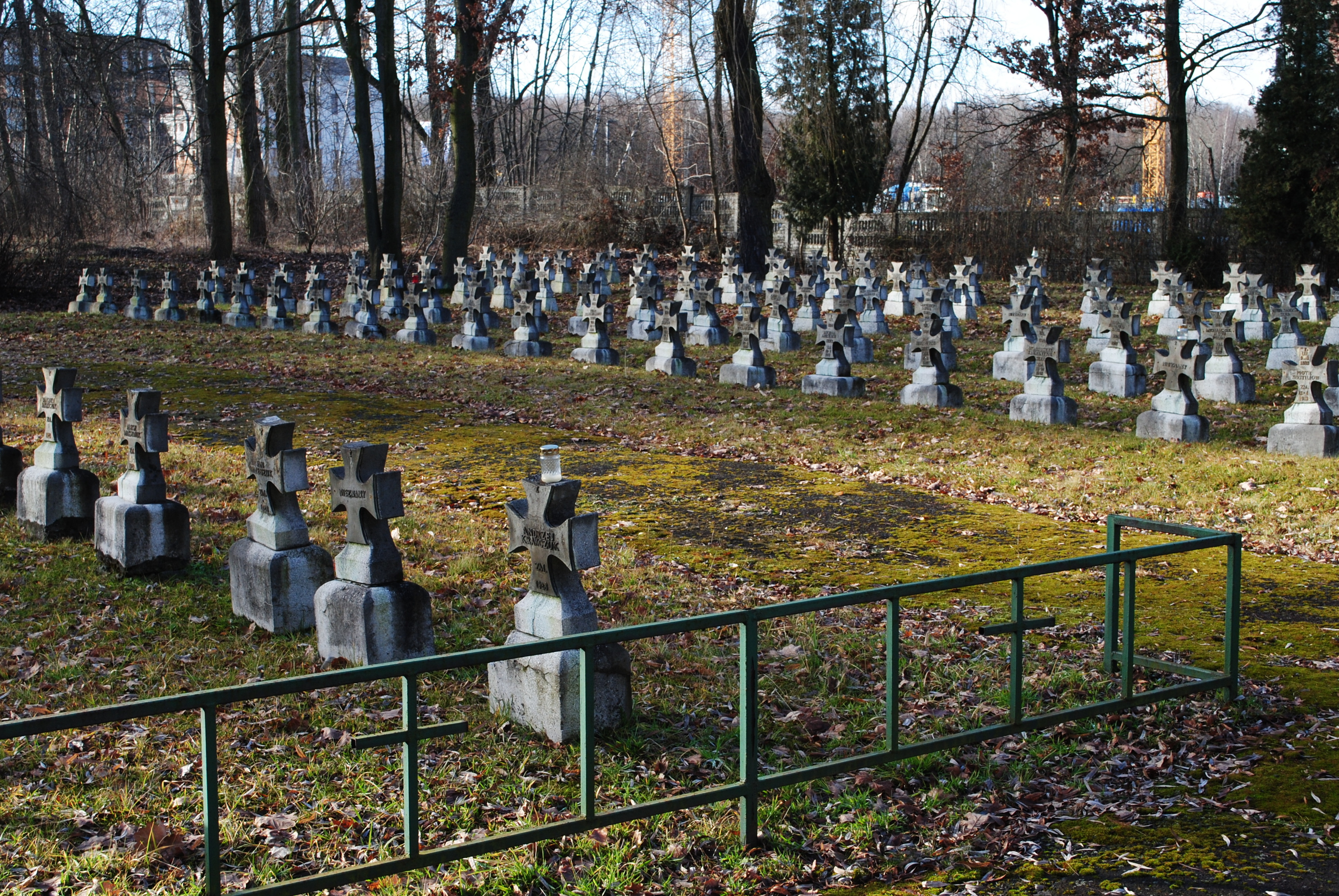
Fragment of the garrison cemetery established in the 1920s on Meteorologów Street

In the 19th century, the Brynów colony, Kamionka, was founded. According to Lech Szaraniec, it was located in the area of present-day Parkowa, Mikołowska, and Piękna streets, while according to Michał Bulsa, this colony was created in the mid-19th century and existed in the area of the current Śródmieście, along Mikołowska Street between Józef Poniatowski Street and the motorway junction, consisting of eight houses. Before World War I, villas were built in the Kamionka area for the mining supervision of the Oheim (Wujek) mine.

Before Katowice was granted city rights on 11 September 1865, Brynów was separated from the new city area and formed an independent municipality, as well as the Brynów manor area, which was managed from the farmstead on present-day T. Kościuszko Street (now the grounds of the Municipal Greenery Department in Katowice). At that time, Brynów belonged to the newly created Katowice County, formed on 27 March 1873.

At 3 Dworska Street, a public school building for the children of Brynów was opened in 1865. On the grounds of the former Beate coal mine, in 1888, the first stages of a new park were created in a suburban forest, and between 1894 and 1895, the Süd Park was established. In 1925, it was renamed Kościuszko Park.

In 1899, the Oheim (Wujek) mine was launched, and with the expansion of the plant, new residential houses were built, mainly around Katowicka Hałda, while further development of the central part of Brynów was hindered by the existing manor.

=== Interwar period and World War II ===
During the Silesian Uprisings and the plebiscite, the residents of Brynów actively participated, especially in the Third Silesian Uprising. The insurgents from Brynów and Karbowa were part of the 1st company of the 3rd insurgent regiment, commanded by Rudolf Niemczyk. In the Upper Silesia plebiscite held on 20 March 1921, out of 12,389 people eligible to vote, 6,783 residents of the Brynów commune voted for joining Poland, while 5,189 voted for Germany. In 1922, the area that is now Katowice was annexed by Poland, and shortly after the creation of the Silesian Voivodeship, efforts began to eliminate manor estates. The Brynów manor area was incorporated into the Brynów commune in 1924.

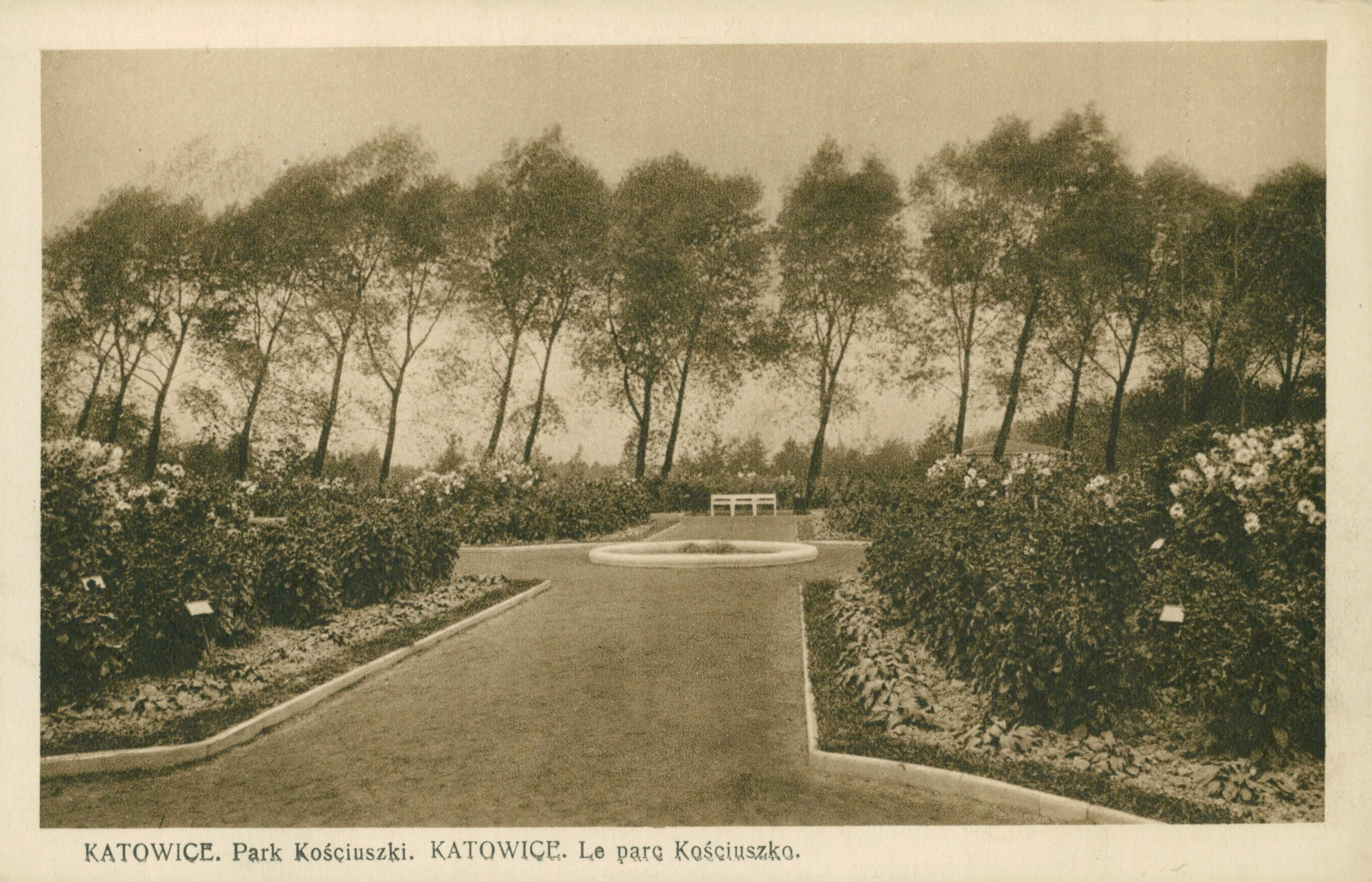
Fragment of Kościuszko Park on a postcard published between 1927 and 1939

In the 1920s, a cemetery for prisoners of war from 1917 was established, becoming the Katowice garrison cemetery. On 15 October 1924, the area of today's Brynów-Osiedle Zgrzebnioka district was incorporated into the boundaries of Katowice. In 1925, due to the increase in population after the city's expansion, the Katowice City Council divided the city into districts. One of these districts was Ligota-Brynów.

In 1930, the first Katowice Fair was held on Tadeusz Kościuszko Street, on the lands opposite Kościuszko Park. In 1938, the wooden Church of St. Michael the Archangel was moved from Syrynia to the southern part of the park.

The actions of World War II in the area of Katowice began on 1 September 1939. Between 1 and 2 September, the city was abandoned by the Polish army and administration. On 4 September, a column from the 239th Infantry Division, led by Erich Höcker, entered the area of Brynów. Following Tadeusz Kościuszko Street, the column reached Kościuszko Park, where they were fired upon from the Parachute Tower.

In October of the same year, the Upper Silesia region was annexed into the Third Reich, and the new occupying authorities restored the pre-1922 place names, leaving all administrative changes that had occurred up until then unchanged. On 3 February 1942, by decree of the Oberpräsident of the Province of Upper Silesia, the names of the districts of Katowice were changed. Among these, the district of Kattowitz-Süd was created, covering the areas of Karbowa, Brynów, Załęska Hałda, and part of the center of Katowice south of the railway tracks.

=== Post-war period ===
After the Polish authorities took control of areas in Upper Silesia in 1945, the legal status of the area was restored to that of 1 September 1939, disregarding the changes made by the German occupying authorities. By a resolution of the National Council in Stalinogrod on 5 October 1954, Katowice was divided into three districts. The present-day Brynów-Osiedle Zgrzebnioka district was partially within all three of these districts, with a tripoint at the intersection of L. Różycki, T. Kościuszko, and Gawronów streets. In 1973, the division of Katowice into districts was abolished.

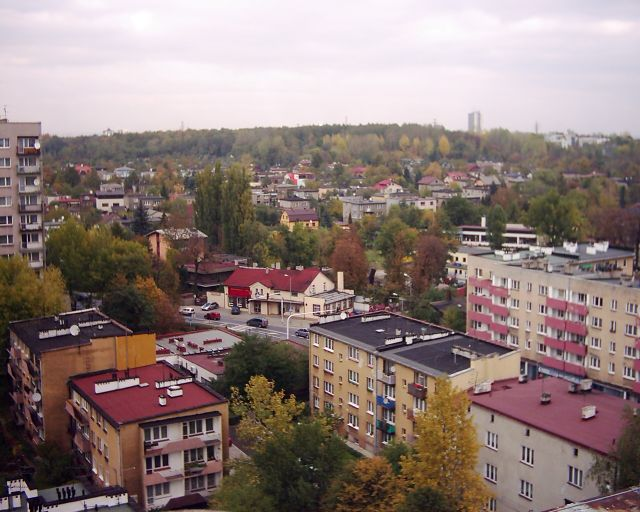
Part of Brynów A Estate (2003)

In the times of the Polish People's Republic, in the 1960s, two housing estates were built in the area of the present district. The so-called Brynów A Estate was constructed, featuring single-family housing between Brynowska and T. Kościuszko streets, and also the Brynów B Estate, located to the east of T. Kościuszko Street and north of St. Hubert Street – this second estate began to be referred to as the Ptasie Estate. In the 1970s, the Górnośląska Avenue section was modernized, acquiring two lanes of traffic in each direction. Between 1978 and 1982, the Mikołowski Roundabout at the intersection of Mikołowska Street and Górnośląska Avenue was rebuilt into a large road junction. In 1978, the construction of the Alfons Zgrzebniok Estate, planned to house 3,500 residents, began on the grounds of the Brynów manor.

After the start of the political transformation in Poland, on 16 September 1991, the City Council of Katowice adopted a resolution dividing Katowice into 22 auxiliary local government units and 22 areas of their activities. During this time, local government unit No. 5 Brynów was established within the boundaries of the present-day Brynów-Osiedle Zgrzebnioka district. The current name of the district was adopted by a resolution of the Katowice City Council on 29 September 1997.

On 5 February 1990, an ophthalmic hospital of the then Medical University of Silesia was officially opened at 35 Ceglana Street, with Professor Ariadna Gierek-Łapińska appointed as the hospital director. In 2016, the University Centre of Ophthalmology and Oncology was merged with the Central Clinical Hospital into the Professor K. Gibiński University Clinical Centre of the Medical University of Silesia.

On 14 December 1991, the Church of the Exaltation of the Holy Cross was solemnly consecrated by Bishop Damian Zimoń. The ceremony was attended by, among others, Polish Prime Minister Jan Krzysztof Bielecki, Katowice Voivode Wojciech Czech, Katowice Mayor Jerzy Śmiałek, and other representatives. The following day, ceremonies were held in honor of the miners who died during the pacification of the Wujek mine, with Nuncio Archbishop Józef Kowalczyk presiding over the solemn Mass. The President of Poland, Lech Wałęsa, also attended this event.

After 1989, the areas of Brynów-Osiedle Zgrzebnioka, especially the area around Ceglana Street, became a place for urban development. On 30 October 1996, a section of the A4 autostrada between Murckowska Street and Mysłowice was opened. Between 2013 and 2017, a complex of hospital buildings for Geo Medical was constructed, and in 2019, the construction of residential estates Ceglana Park and Zdrowe Stylove began.

== Demographics ==
Gender and age structure of the population of Brynów-Osiedle Zgrzebnioka (as of 31 December 2015)
Period/Population	Pre-productive(0–18 years)	Productive(18–60/65 years)	Post-productive(over 60/65 years)	Total
Total	929	3,556	2,161	6,646
Women	458	1,762	1,403	3,623
Men	471	1,794	758	3,023
Feminization rate	97	98	185	120

The population of Brynów-Osiedle Zgrzebnioka shows a declining trend. In 1997, the district had 7.4 thousand residents, in 2005 the population was 7,206, and in 2010, it was 6,951 (2.3% of Katowice's population). During this period, 12.7% of the district's residents were in the pre-productive age group, 58.1% were in the productive age group, and 29.2% were in the post-productive age group.

According to a survey conducted on a group of 78 residents of the district in 2011, 88.5% identified as Poles (the highest percentage among all Katowice districts), 5.1% as Silesians (the lowest percentage among all Katowice districts), and 6.4% as both Poles and Silesians (also the lowest percentage among all Katowice districts).

In 2013, the district had 6,719 residents, including 714 individuals under 14 years old and 952 individuals over 75 years old.

A detailed chart of the population in various years for Brynów-Osiedle Zgrzebnioka is provided below:

== Politics and administration ==
Brynów-Osiedle Zgrzebnioka is one of the 22 districts of Katowice and functions as an auxiliary unit of the municipality. It was established by the resolution of the City Council in Katowice as the municipal district (District No. 5) on 1 January 1992. According to Resolution No. XLVI/449/97 of the City Council of Katowice from 29 September 1997, Brynów-Osiedle Zgrzebnioka is a statutory district within the western districts cluster.

The current district statute was established by Resolution No. XLI/895/21 of the City Council of Katowice on 25 November 2021. According to the provisions of the statute, the governing bodies of the district are the District Council and the District Board. The District Council consists of 15 councilors elected for a five-year term. It is the legislative body of the district, and its tasks include, among others, submitting proposals to the city authorities regarding residents' requests, initiating and organizing commemorative events, cultural, sports, or recreational activities, reviewing local initiatives, and making proposals on matters related to the area of Brynów-Osiedle Zgrzebnioka. The District Board is the executive body of the district. The Chairperson of the District Board represents the district externally, and its tasks include, among others, receiving residents' petitions, organizing and coordinating social initiatives, informing residents about district matters, and preparing draft resolutions for the District Council.

At the beginning of 2023, the District Council and the District Board were not functioning.

The A. Zgrzebniok Estate is managed by the Katowice Housing Cooperative. The estate's administration is located at 19 Łabędzia Street. It manages 52 residential buildings, containing 615 residential units and 15 commercial premises. The administration oversees an area of 112,422 m^{2}.

At 14c L. Różycki Street, the Saint-Étienne City House in Katowice and the ASEMKA Association (Association Saint-Étienne Métropole Katowice) operate. These are partner organizations focused on supporting and developing cooperation between the two partner cities – Katowice and Saint-Étienne – and their regions, both economically and socio-culturally. Additionally, the French Consular Agency in Katowice operates at 56 Szpaków Street. The agency's activities include protecting France's interests, supporting French businesses, assisting French citizens residing in the Silesian Voivodeship, fostering scientific and cultural cooperation, and promoting French heritage and language.

== Economy ==
=== Characteristics ===
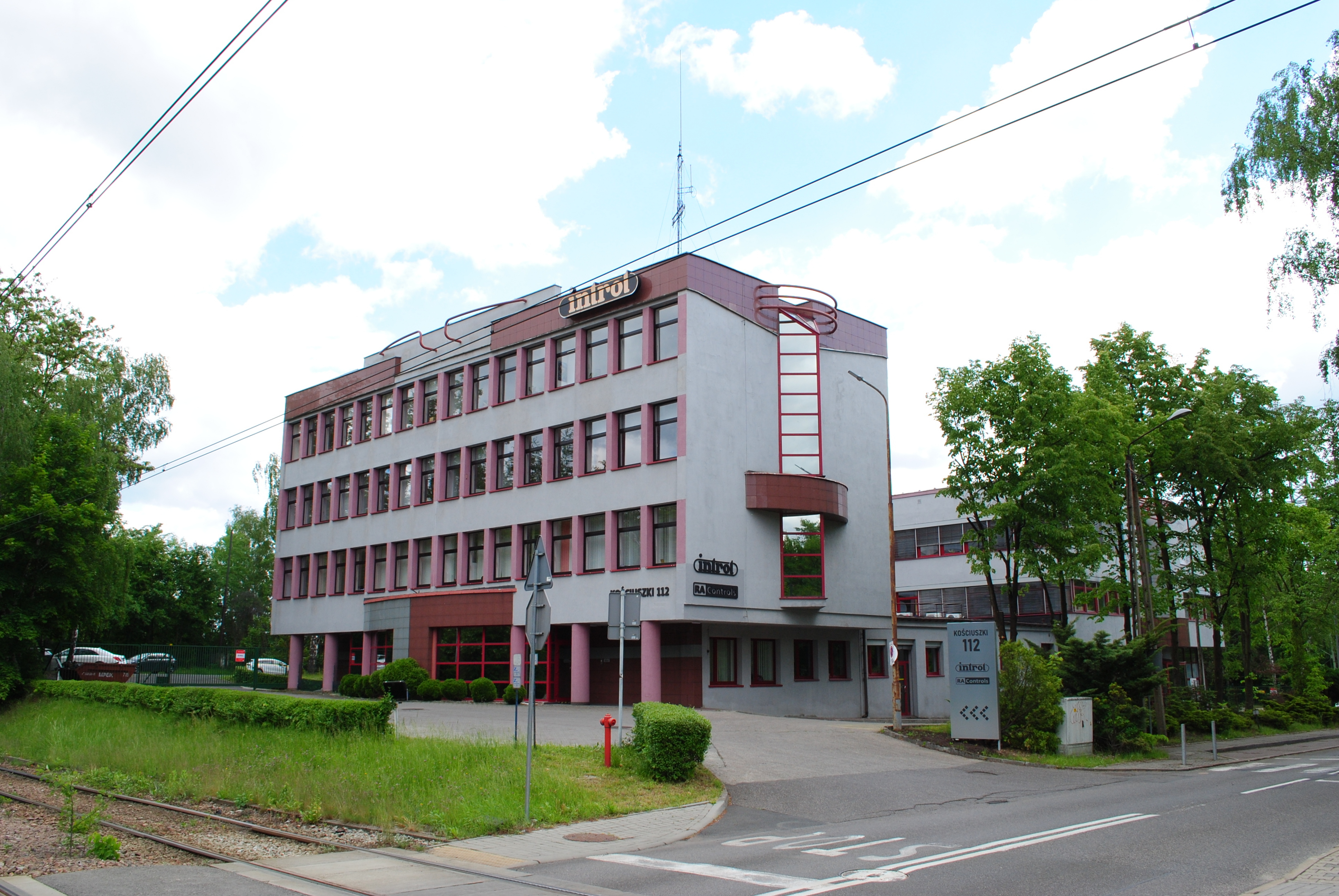
Headquarters of Introl company (112 T. Kościuszko Street)

The district of Brynów-Osiedle Zgrzebnioka does not have an industrial character. It is primarily a residential and recreational area, with significant roles in healthcare and administrative-office functions. Economic activity is mainly concentrated in the northern part of the district.

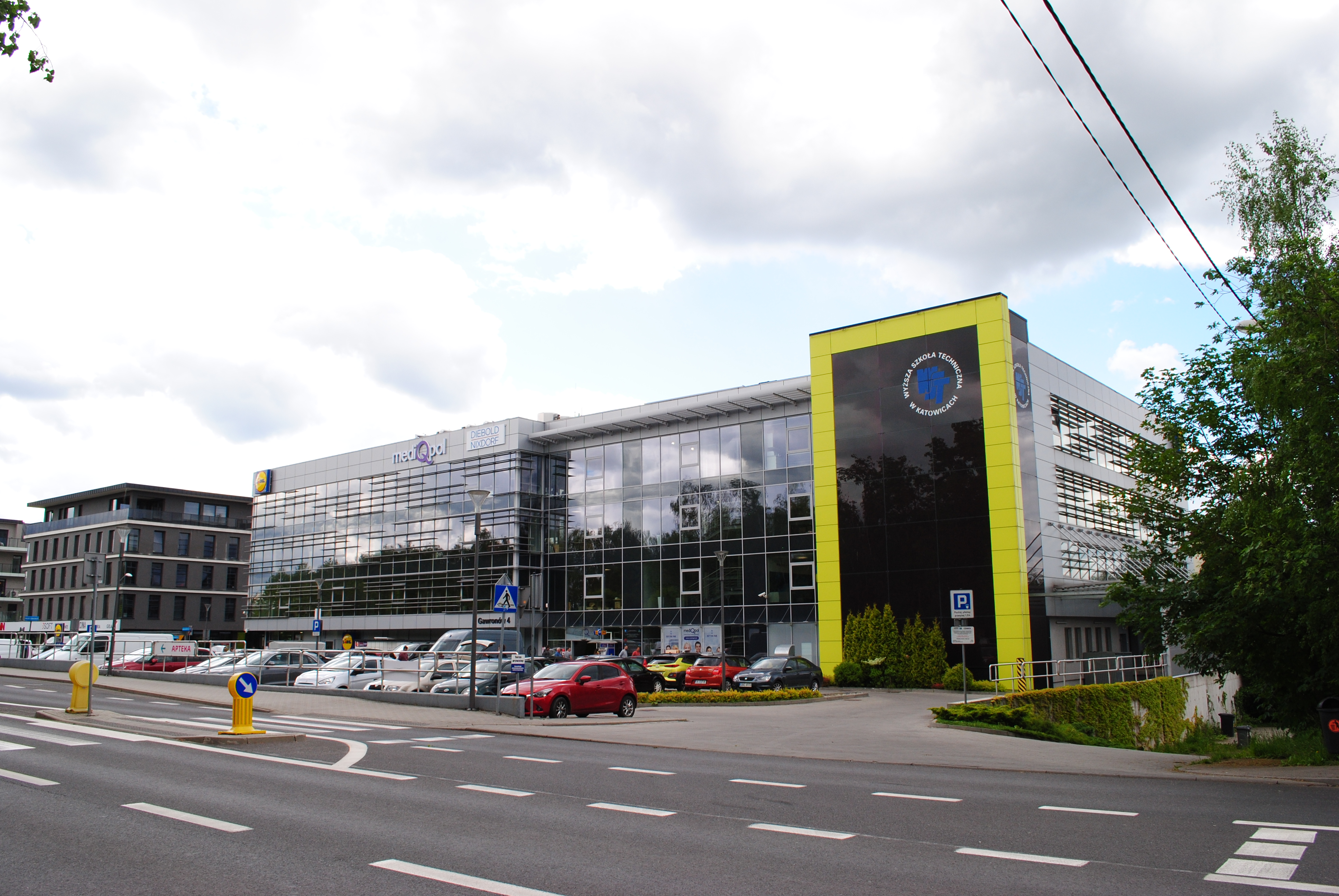
Brynów Center office building (4 Gawronów Street)

The district hosts two companies listed on the Warsaw Stock Exchange. The first is Introl, located at 112 T. Kościuszko Street. Since 1990, the company has been involved in the modernization, automation, and control of various technological processes. It is a supplier of control and measurement equipment and industrial process automation systems. The second is Pragmago, a factoring company based at 72 Brynowska Street, specializing in financing micro and small enterprises.

The district has developed local service and retail centers, with a focus on essential goods and services. Two main centers are located in Brynów (along Brynowska Street from Dworska Street to T. Kościuszko Street) and in the Zgrzebniok Estate (from Gawronów Street to Lelków Street). Additionally, there are numerous small neighborhood stores throughout the area. However, the district does not feature any shopping malls; the nearest one is Libero Katowice, located in the neighboring district of Ligota-Panewniki.

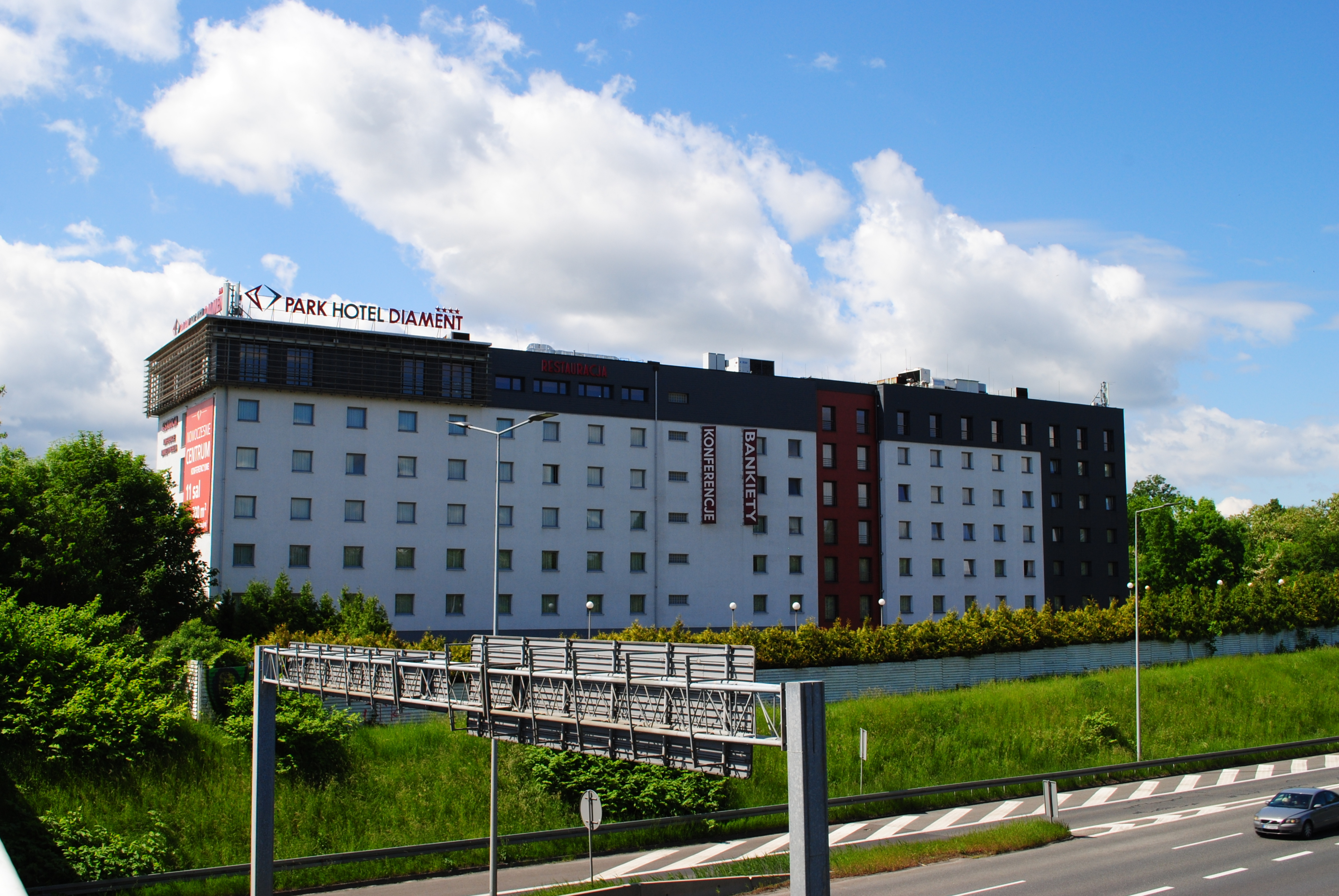
Park Hotel Diament Katowice located at 37 W. Stwosz Street

As of 31 December 2013, there were 1,307 registered businesses in Brynów-Osiedle Zgrzebnioka, according to the REGON system. Of these, 1,221 were micro-enterprises. At the end of 2013, the district registered 82 unemployed individuals, making up 1.22% of the district's population – the lowest unemployment rate among all Katowice districts at the time.

=== History ===
In the area of present-day Katowice, until the end of the 18th century, the main sources of livelihood for the local population were agriculture and forestry. The soils in the region were of low fertility, so the cultivation of cereals that did not require high-quality soil, such as rye, oats, and barley, predominated. Additionally, in the Brynów and Załęże areas, hops were grown for beer production. In Brynów, Katowice, and Kuźnica Bogucka, there was also a group of people associated with the local iron forge during this period. In the 19th century, a large landholding was established on a significant portion of the Brynów land. In the area of today's Dworska and A. Zgrzebniok streets, a manor house was built. This estate, along with mining rights, was purchased by Prince Hohenlohe-Öhringen at the end of the 19th century. In 1905, the estate was taken over by the Hohenlohe-Werke company. After World War II, the buildings of the former Brynów manor housed the State Agricultural Farm Brynów.

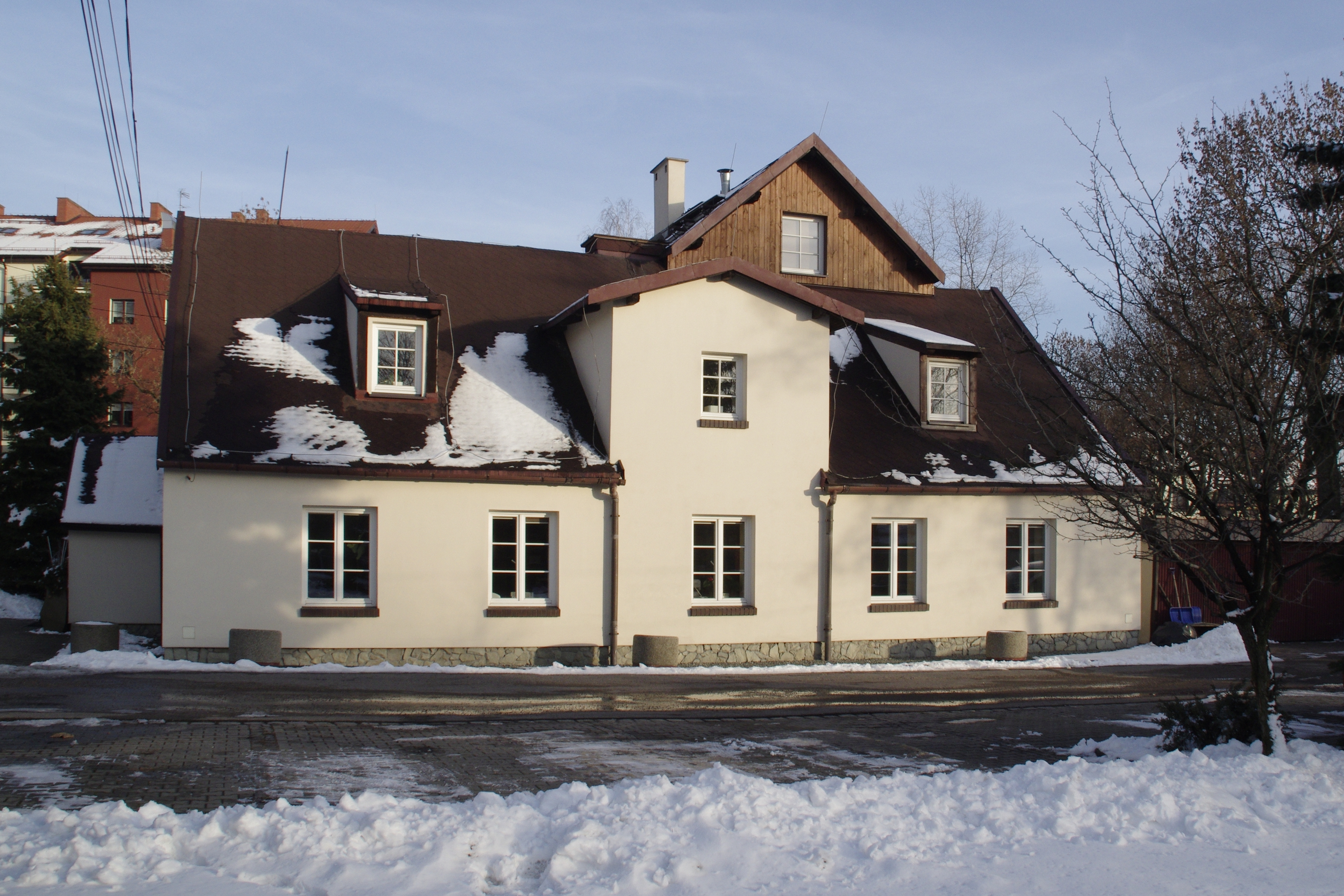
Complex of the former Brynów manor at 138 T. Kościuszko Street, dating back to the mid-19th century

Modern industry in the entire Katowice area was introduced by the entrepreneur Johann Ferdinand Koulhaas. He decided to implement, based on his own experiences, plans to smelt iron using hard coal. He began exploiting the coal in Brynów, opening the Beate coal mine in 1801, located in what is now Kościuszko Park. The mining field for the mine was granted on 2 March 1801, and the facility operated until 1806. In 1835, the mine was bought by Karl Friedrich Lehmann, and the following year, operations resumed. The mine continued to function until 1880. The main shaft of the mine, the Kremski shaft, was 76 meters deep and was located in the area of the former tram depot at T. Kościuszko Street (now a Škoda showroom). Nearby were other mine buildings, including the administration building and probably the miners' club. In the 1850s, the mine produced an average of 19,000 tons of coal annually, with 140 employees working at the mine.

On 29 April 1823, a zinc smelter called Henriette was established in what is now the eastern part of Brynów-Osiedle Zgrzebnioka. The smelter had four furnace halls, with a total of 96 crucibles. In 1832, Gustaw Treudleri sold the smelter to the owner of the Katowice estates, Lehman, who on 11 February 1839, sold the facility for 1,000 thalers to Franz von Winckler. The Henriette zinc smelter was a small operation founded on the mining field of the Beate coal mine by Friedrich Wedding, located at the western edge of what is now Kościuszko Park. The facility was housed in a single brick building containing 20 distillation furnaces. In the early 1830s, a decline in zinc demand led to a halt in production. The smelter was sold on 11 February 1832, and by the 1840s, the facility had reached pre-crisis production levels. In 1869, the smelter produced 569 tons of zinc, but by the end of 1870, the furnaces were shut down as the smelter became obsolete. The smelter's club building remained until the late 1960s.

In the 19th century, numerous brickworks also began to emerge in the Brynów area. In the second half of the 19th century, rich clay deposits were discovered on the border of Brynów and Muchowiec. The first brickworks in Katowice was established by the city's builder, Ignatz Grünfeld, who in 1860 founded a company called Ignatz Grünfeld Baugeschäft, which was involved in construction, real estate development, and architectural design. In 1895, a new large and modern brickworks was established in the Karbowa area by Hugo Grünfeld, the son of Ignatz. This facility primarily produced glazed bricks. In 1934, the Grünfeld brickworks was destroyed by fire, and the family gradually began selling off its assets. Traces of the history of the former brickworks in the area remain in the form of Ceglana Street and Grünfeld pond, a remnant of the former clay extraction site.

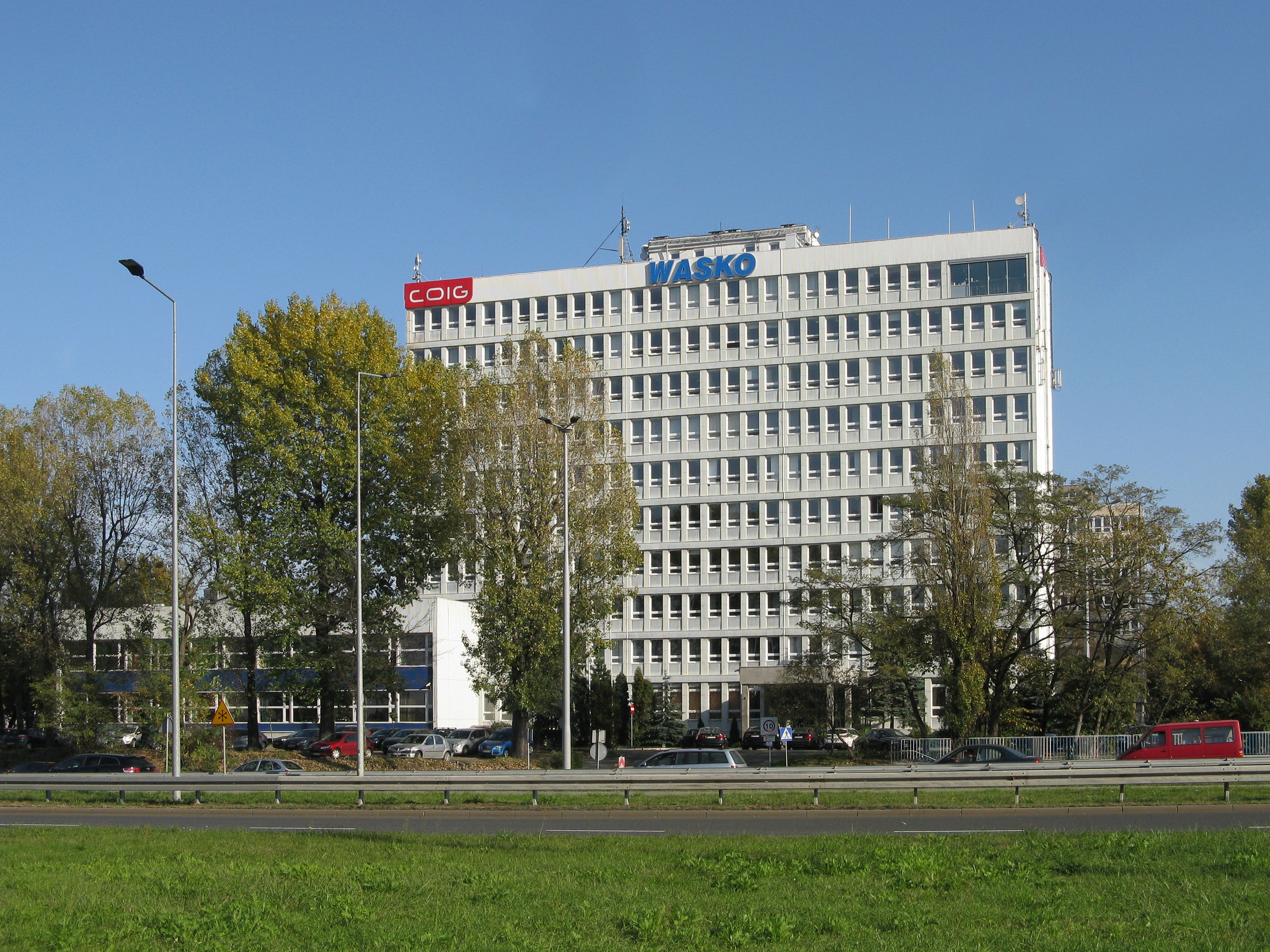
Former headquarters of the Central Mining Computer Center (later COIG; 100 Mikołowska Street)

In the area between Brynowska and Mikołowska streets, there was also a brickworks named Badura, with Johann Badura as its first owner. During World War II, the facility was taken over by the Germans, and in 1950, it was nationalized, with a compulsory state management established by the Silesian General Directorate of Local Industry in Gliwice. In November 2019, construction began on the first Kaufland store in Katowice on the site of the former brickworks, which opened in late October 2020.

Between 1929 and 1930, a wooden market hall was built on the site of the former sports field at 90 T. Kościuszko Street. In the spring of 1930, the First Katowice Fair was organized there. Over time, the building became a venue for various exhibitions and fairs. However, the state of the building continuously deteriorated, and it was eventually demolished in the 1950s.

In the 1970s, on the site of the former Henriette smelter at 100 Mikołowska Street, the Coal Industry Construction Enterprise erected the building of the Central Mining Computer Center (later known as COIG). The Central Mining Computer Center was established in 1976, and in 1994, the enterprise was transformed into a Sole-shareholder company of the State Treasury. In 2012, it was incorporated into the WASKO Capital Group. COIG specializes in providing comprehensive, dedicated IT solutions that support management processes.

== Technical infrastructure ==
The supply of running water to the eastern part of Brynów-Osiedle Zgrzebnioka is provided through the Mikołów and Murcki network reservoirs. These reservoirs are fed by water treatment plants located in Dziećkowice, Goczałkowice-Zdrój, and Kobiernice. The treated water is then pumped into the distribution system of the Upper Silesian Waterworks, from which it reaches the district via a network of water mains managed by Katowickie Wodociągi. One of the transit water pipelines of the Upper Silesian Waterworks runs through the district along the A4 autostrada and Meteorologów and A. Zgrzebniok streets.

The operation of the sanitary and combined sewer networks in the district is managed by the South Branch of the Sewer Network Operation of Katowickie Wodociągi. The stormwater drainage system, on the other hand, is overseen by the Municipal Road and Bridge Authority in Katowice. The northern part of the district, near Katowicka Hałda, is connected to the Centrum Sewage Treatment Plant, while the rest of the district – including the historical center of Brynów and the Brynów A, Ptasie, and A. Zgrzebniok estates – is served by the Panewniki Sewage Treatment Plant. The Centrum plant serves areas within the Rawa river basin, while the Panewniki plant handles areas in the Kłodnica river basin. The combined sewer system is found in older built-up areas, such as around Brynowska Street. The A. Zgrzebniok Estate, however, has a separate sewer system for sanitary and stormwater drainage. Main sanitary collectors run along T. Kościuszko and Kukułek streets, while main stormwater collectors are located along T. Kościuszko, Mikołowska, and Gawronów streets.

Electricity supply to the eastern part of Brynów-Osiedle Zgrzebnioka is provided through a 110 kV high-voltage network. This network runs through the district along Ceglana, Meteorologów, and A. Zgrzebniok streets, connecting to the Brynów substation located on Brynowska Street, which operates at 110/20/6 kV. The overhead power grid is managed by Polskie Sieci Elektroenergetyczne.

The district is supplied with high-methane natural gas (GZ-50). The gas supply system for Katowice does not have local sources of gas but is integrated into national networks. Additionally, a high-pressure gas pipeline runs parallel to the southern side of the A4 autostrada, with two first-stage reduction and metering stations located within the district.

== Transport ==
=== Road transport ===
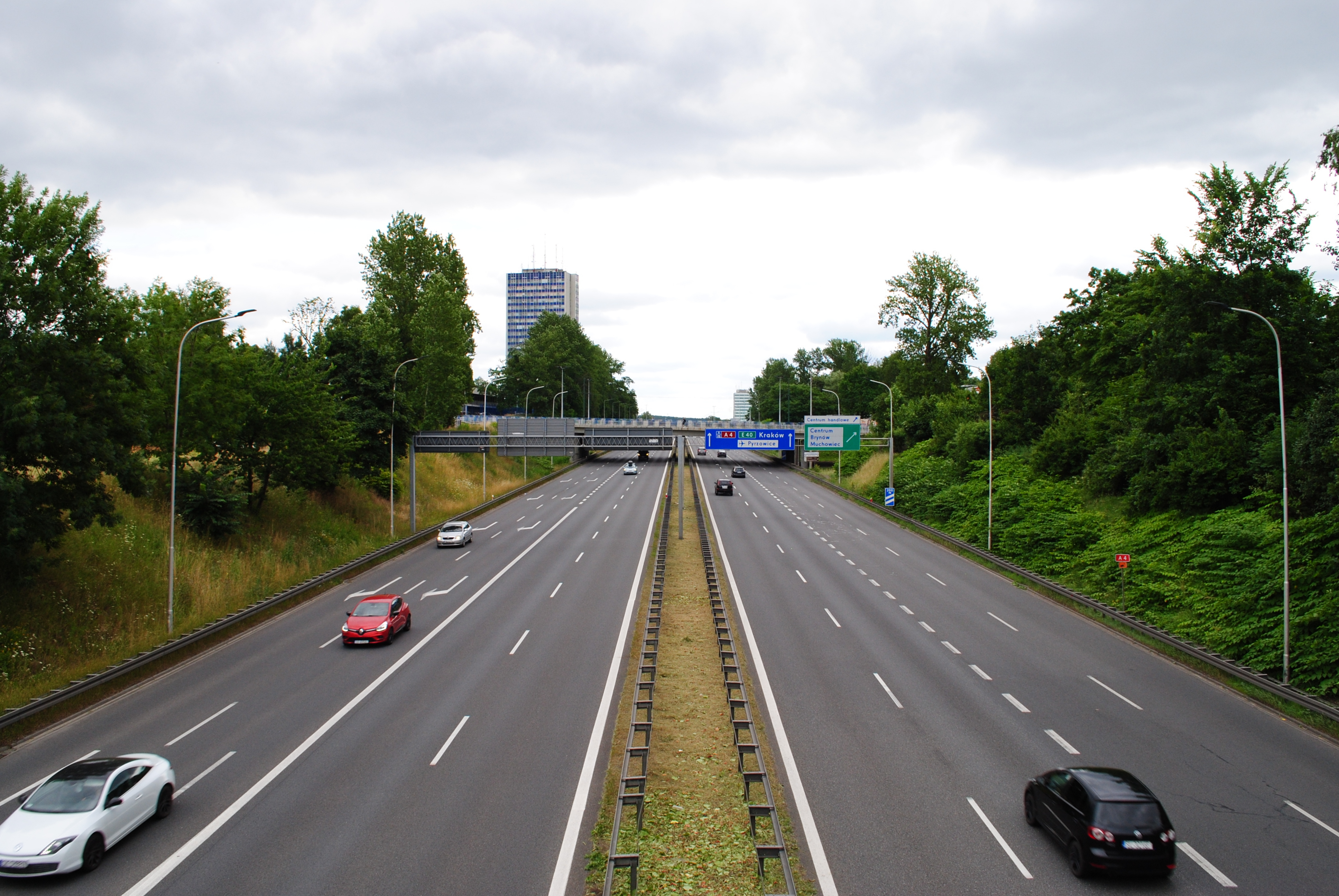
Section of the A4 autostrada (Górnośląska Avenue) at the height of Brynów-Osiedle Zgrzebnioka (view towards Kraków)

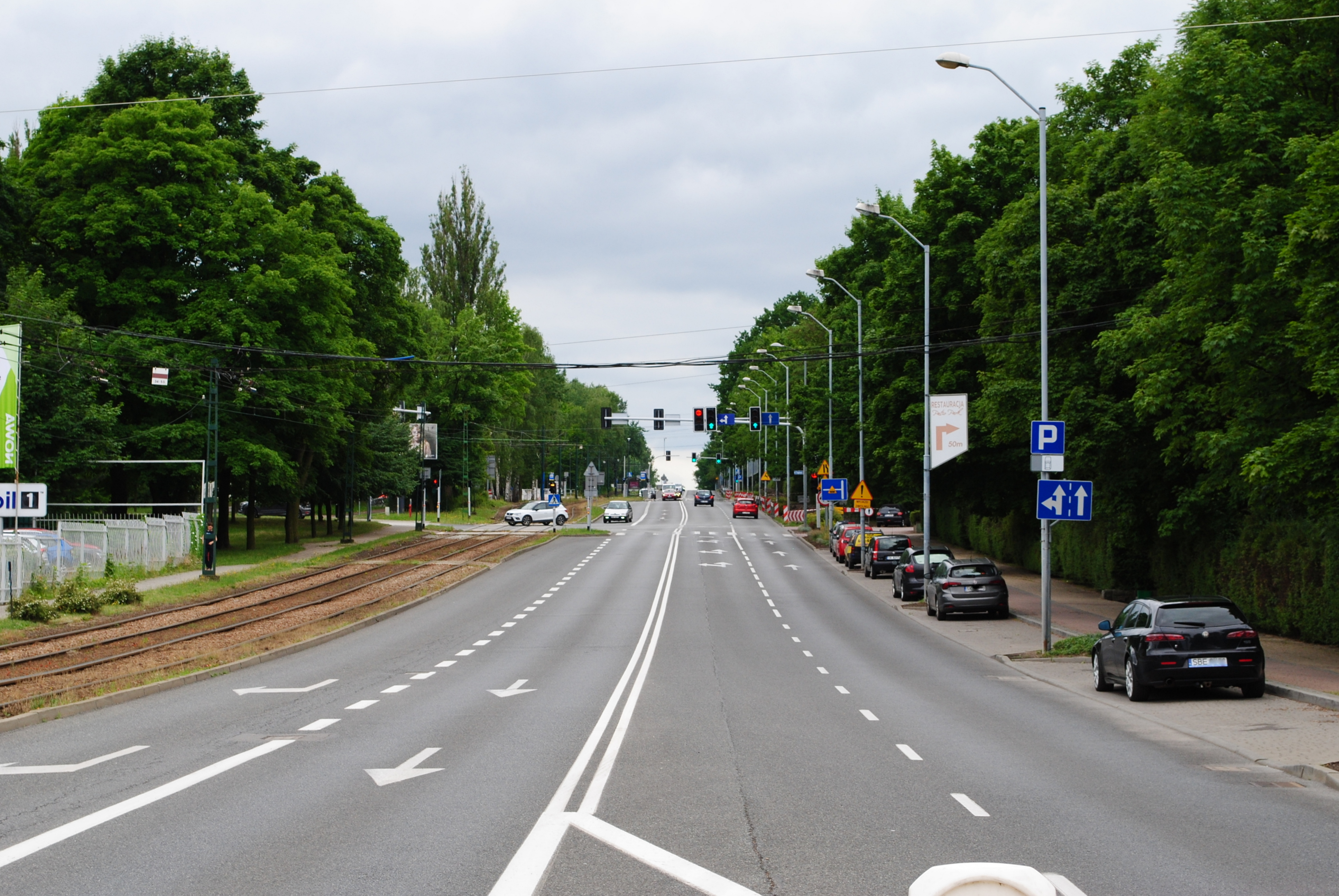
Section of T. Kościuszko Street at the height of Kościuszko Park

Key roadways traverse Brynów-Osiedle Zgrzebnioka, connecting it to regional and national networks. Below are the main roads within and near the district:

- A4 autostrada (Górnośląska Avenue) – this major road forms the northern boundary of the district and is part of the European route E40. It facilitates long-distance traffic, both interregional and international, heading west toward Wrocław and Germany or east toward Kraków, Rzeszów, and Ukraine.

The following roads are among the most important for internal traffic within the district:

- Brynowska Street – a key north–south artery in western Brynów, linking Mikołowska Street in the north with T. Kościuszko Street in the south. It is classified as a district road (Z).
- Ceglana Street – located in the eastern part of the district, it connects Brynów to Śródmieście and Osiedle Paderewskiego – Muchowiec. It is also classified as a district road (Z).
- St. Hubert Street – a local road in the southern district, connecting T. Kościuszko Street with the St. Hubert settlement. It is a municipal road (L).
- Tadeusz Kościuszko Street – the longest street in Katowice, linking the city centre with Brynów, Ochojec, Piotrowice, and Zarzecze. Within Brynów, it serves as a major access route to the city centre, classified as a district road (Z).
- Łabędzia Street – a local road in Zgrzebniok Estate, running parallel to T. Kościuszko Street. It is classified as an access road (D).
- Mikołowska Street – a 2.3 km road serving as an exit route from Katowice's city centre toward the south, crossing through Katowicka Hałda within Brynów. It is a district road (Z).
- Wit Stwosz Street – situated in the northern part of the district, it runs approximately north–south, connecting Brynów with Śródmieście. It is classified as a district road (Z).

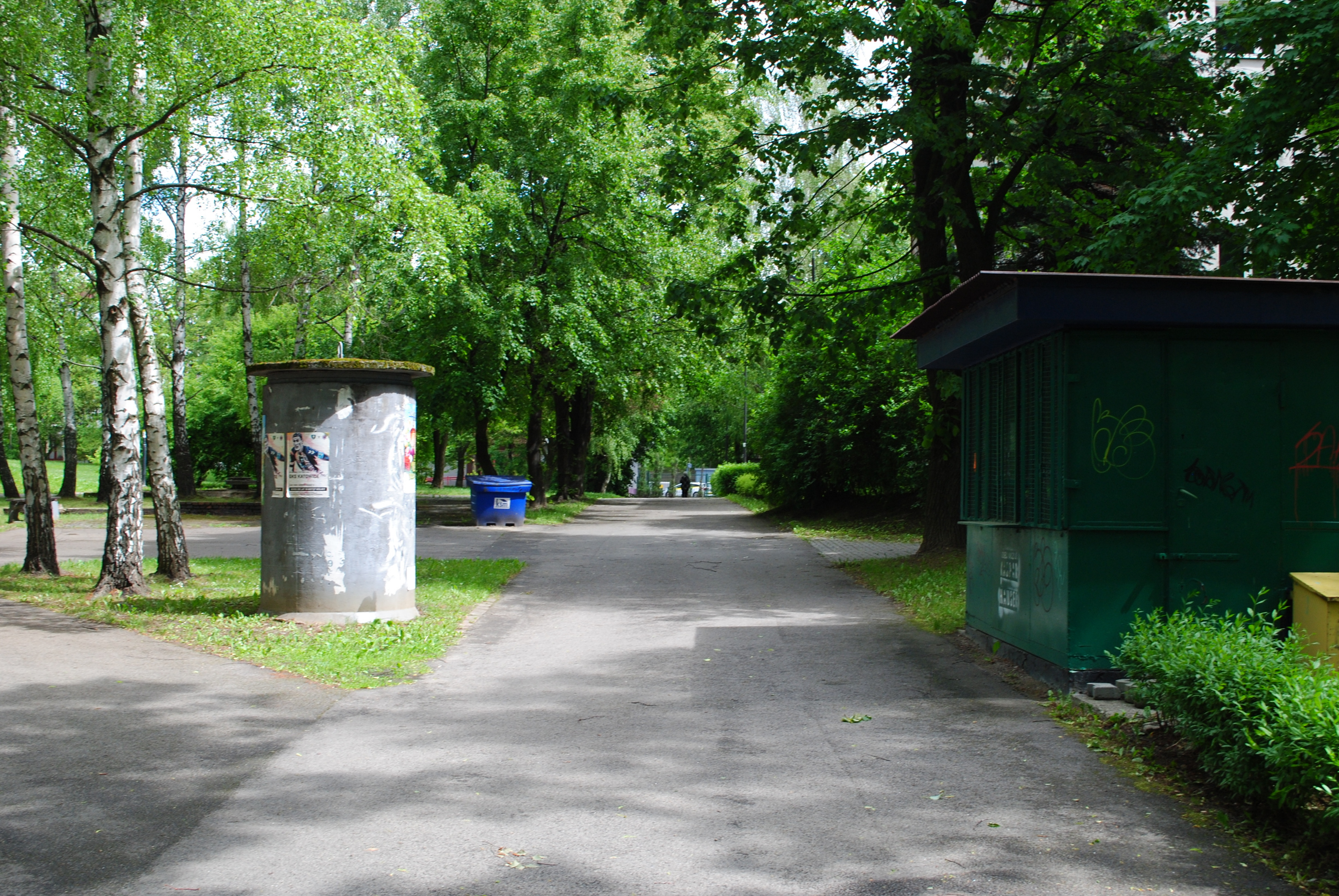
Section of Łabędzia Street

The A4 autostrada, which partially runs through the Brynów-Osiedle Zgrzebnioka district, is a key element of the Katowice transportation system. This road carries long-distance traffic (international and interregional connections), and to a lesser extent, regional traffic. The section between the Mikołowski and Murckowski interchanges is called Górnośląska Avenue.

The district is connected to the center of Katowice via the following roads: T. Kościuszko, Brynowska – Mikołowska (Mikołowska interchange on the A4 autostrada), and Meteorologów – Ceglana (Francuska interchange on the A4 autostrada). Traveling by private transport from the district to the city center near the Market Square takes between 10 and 15 minutes during off-peak hours, and about 10 minutes longer during peak hours.

In terms of transportation connections between various parts of Katowice, access to the city center from Ligota and Brynów is very good via T. Kościuszko Street. The best connections between Brynów and other macroregions of Katowice are with Piotrowice and Kostuchna, while the weakest connections are with Bogucice, Pniaki, Józefowiec, and Koszutka. Access to these parts of Katowice is possible via lower-class roads running through the city center (including F.W. Grundmann or Sokolska streets).

In 2008, the most congested roads in terms of vehicle flow per hour during the afternoon peak were Górnośląska Avenue (A4 autostrada) and the road sections: Brynowska–Mikołowska–T. Kościuszko, Meteorologów–Ceglana, and Dworska streets.

=== Rail transport ===
The Brynów-Osiedle Zgrzebnioka district does not have any railway stations or passenger stops. The closest ones are Katowice Brynów in the Załęska Hałda-Brynów district and Katowice Ligota in the Ligota-Panewniki district.

A section of Dąbrowa Górnicza Towarowa–Panewnik railway runs through the district, partially along its southern border. This is a secondary, nationally significant line used for freight traffic. It was opened on 27 September 1953 and was electrified on 30 May 1970.

At 11 St. Hubert Street is the headquarters of one of the PKP Cargo railway transport company's facilities – the Southern Branch.

=== Cycling transport ===
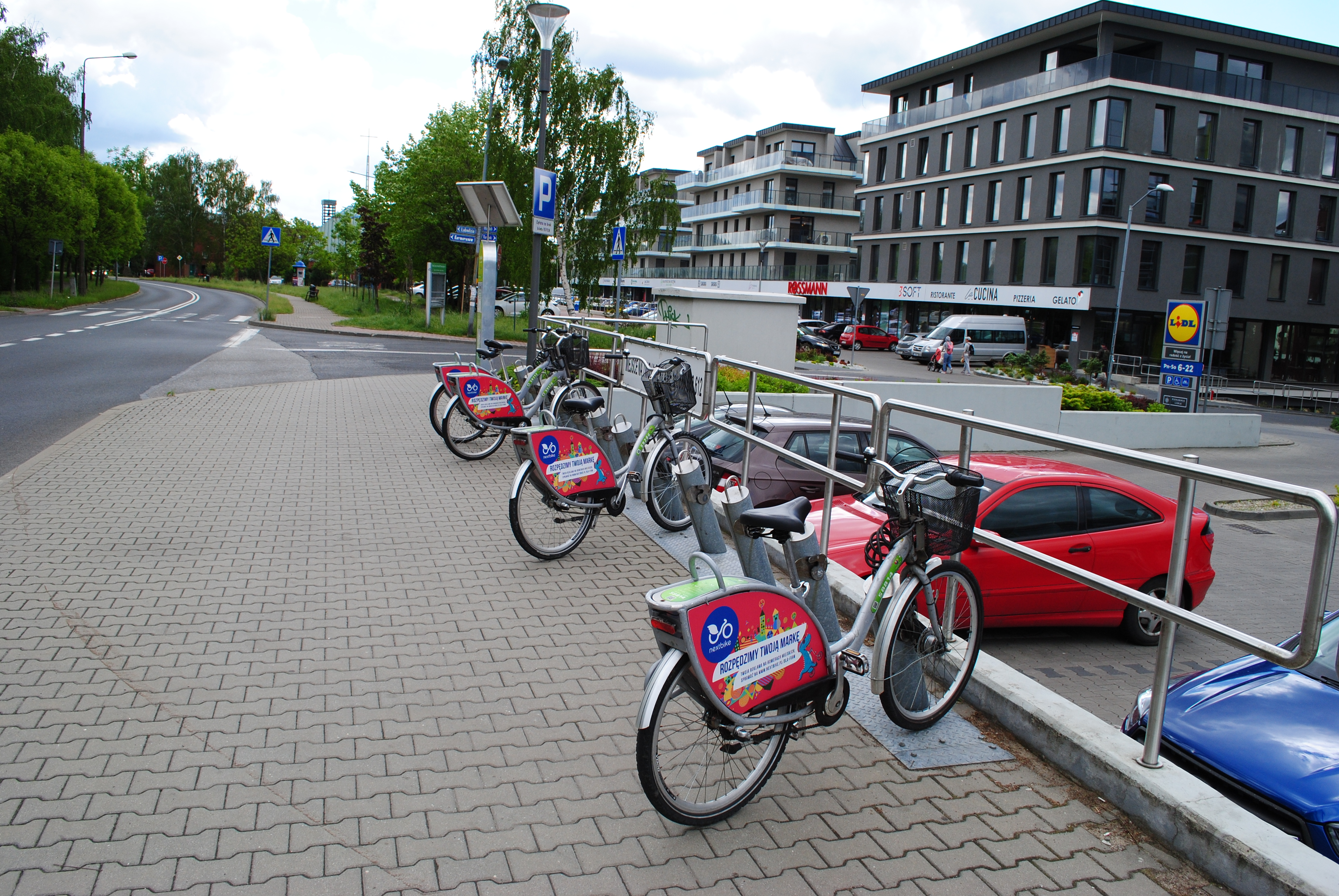
City by Bike rental station at Ptasie Estate (2022)

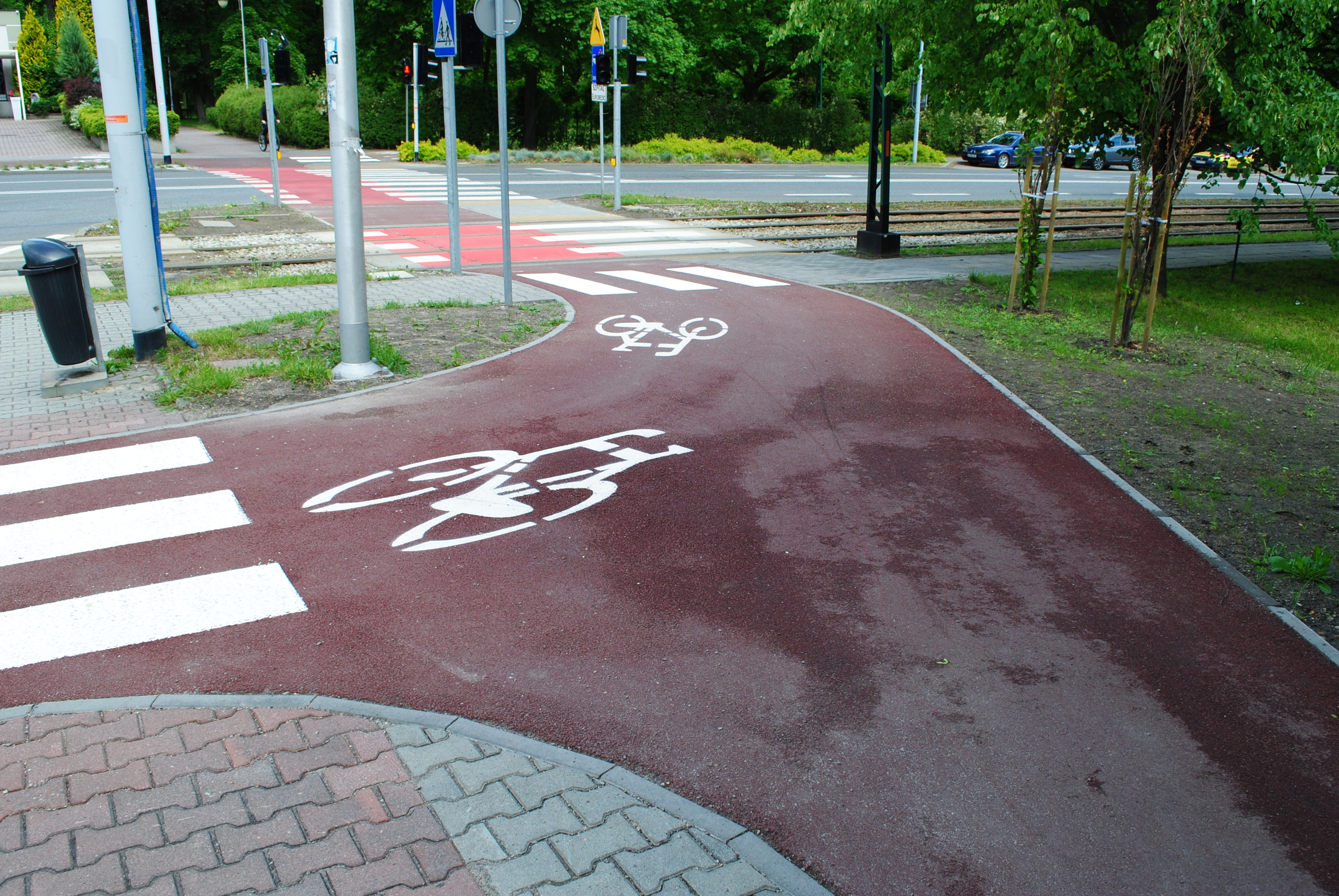
Fragment of the bicycle path at the intersection of T. Kościuszko and Ceglana streets (2022)

The cycling infrastructure network in the Brynów-Osiedle Zgrzebnioka district is unevenly developed. According to the planned network of bike paths published by the city of Katowice, as of early 2023, the network of transport function bike paths is partially developed. Missing routes include sections along Ceglana, Mikołowska, and W. Stwosz streets. Existing transport function routes run along T. Kościuszko, A. Zgrzebniok, Drozdów, and St. Hubert streets.

As of early 2023, the following types of bike paths existed in the Brynów-Osiedle Zgrzebnioka district:

- Bike paths – along T. Kościuszko Street (near Łabędzia Street; asphalt path) and Drozdów Street (section between T. Kościuszko and Czyżyków streets; cobblestone path).
- Bike lanes – along Dworska and Drozdów streets at the T. Kościuszko intersection.
- Separated pedestrian-cyclist paths – along T. Kościuszko Street (section from the city center to Łabędzia Street) and A. Zgrzebniok Street (from Łabędzia Street to Gawronów Street).
- Non-separated pedestrian-cyclist paths – along Drozdów Street (section from Skowronków Street to A. Zgrzebniok Street).
- Contraflow lanes – along T. Kościuszko Street (short section from Kościuszko Park to the L. Różycki intersection and a side branch between Drozdów and Słowików streets) and Cz. Miłosz Street.
- Paths with sidewalk use allowed – in Kościuszko Park and along T. Kościuszko Street from St. Hubert Street to the Brynów Transport Hub.

As part of the Cycling across Silesia project, bike trails have been designated throughout the city, and the following intersect the Brynów-Osiedle Zgrzebnioka district:

- Red bike trail No. 1: Śródmieście (Monument of Silesian Insurgents) – Osiedle Paderewskiego – Muchowiec – Brynów-Osiedle Zgrzebnioka (Katowice Forest Park) – Piotrowice-Ochojec – Kostuchna – Podlesie (Zaopusta Street).
- Yellow bike trail No. 2: Brynów-Osiedle Zgrzebnioka (Kościuszko Park) – Załęska Hałda-Brynów – Ligota-Panewniki – the border of the Katowice with Mikołów.

In the Brynów-Osiedle Zgrzebnioka district, part of the city's bike-sharing network, Metrorower, operates, having replaced the City by Bike system. As of early 2023, there were 4 City by Bike stations in this area: Kościuszko Park (T. Kościuszko Street), Basen Brynów (T. Kościuszko Street), Ptasie Estate – Gawronów Street, and Mikołowska – Parkowa Street.

=== Public transport ===
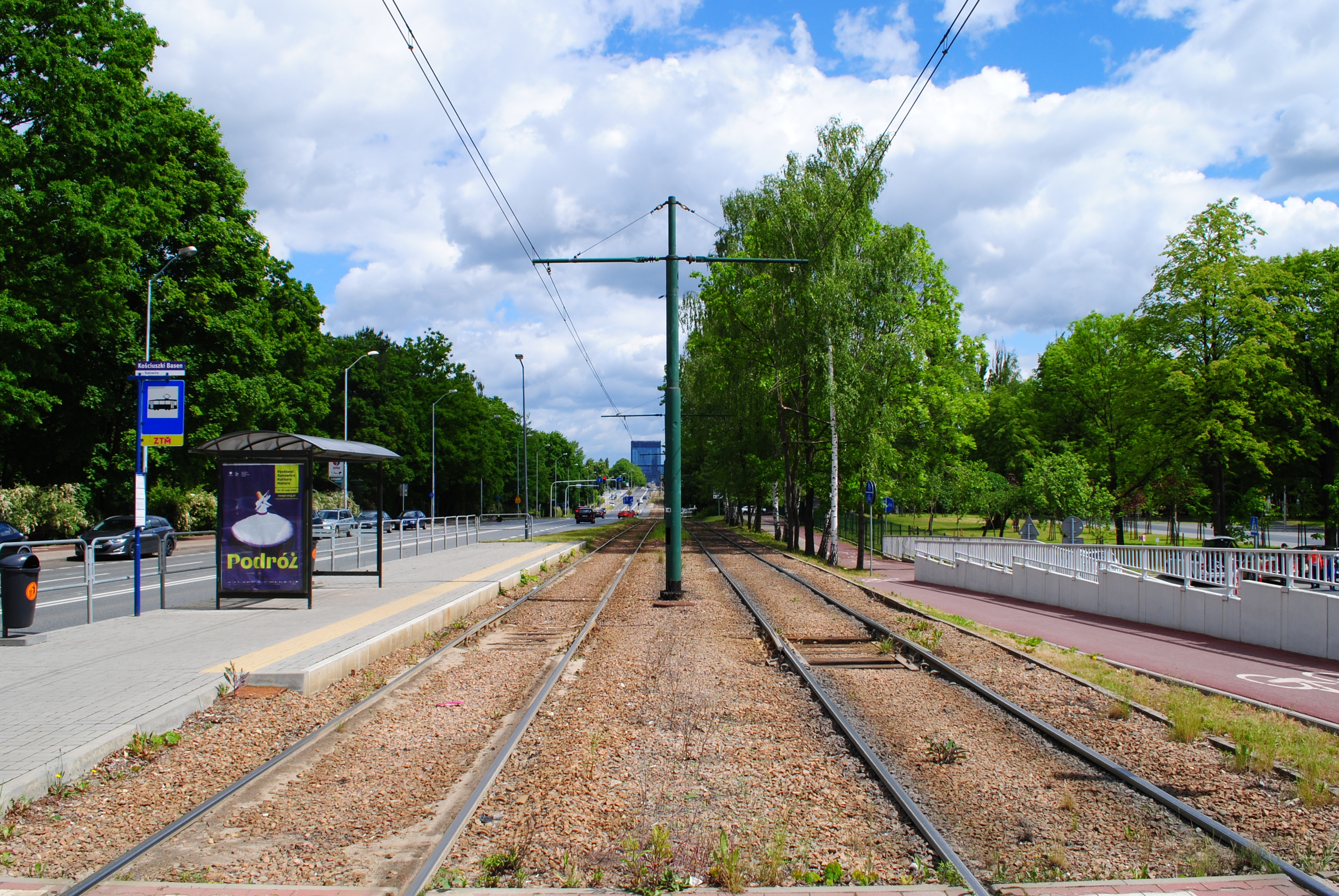
Fragment of the tram line along T. Kościuszko Street at the Kościuszko Basen stop

Public transport within the district is provided through bus and tram connections organized by the Metropolitan Transport Authority. The main operator of the bus lines in the district is Public Transport Company Katowice, while tram services are operated by Tramwaje Śląskie.

The Brynów-Osiedle Zgrzebnioka district is very well connected with the rest of Katowice, with a characteristic feature of the district's transportation system being the proximity of tram and bus stops, which can be reached in a maximum of 5 minutes. Key stops in the district include Brynów W. Pola and Brynów Dworska. As of early 2023, the two-platform stop Brynów W. Pola served 18 bus lines (including 3 night lines) in both directions, while the two-platform stop Brynów Dworska served 8 bus lines (including 1 night line). The two-platform tram stop Brynów Zgrzebnioka served trams from 4 lines at that time.

The most heavily trafficked roads in the district in terms of passenger flow during the afternoon peak in 2008 included the route of Mikołowska–Brynowska–T. Kościuszko streets, as well as T. Kościuszko Street itself.

The tram network reached the area of modern Brynów-Osiedle Zgrzebnioka before World War I. This was a route from the center of Katowice to the current Kościuszko Park and was part of an unrealized tram line to Ligota. Its construction was completed rapidly in May and June 1912 to meet the planned shooting competition scheduled to take place at a range near the park. The line was officially opened on 14 June 1912, along with the establishment of a tram depot. It was the first standard-gauge tram line in Katowice. Tram services on this line were suspended on 5 November 1916 due to the confiscation of the overhead network for wartime purposes, and services resumed on 1 April 1926. After World War II, the line was extended toward Brynów. This extension was opened on 18 September 1947, and in 1969, a tram balloon loop was built to replace the previous passing track.

== Architecture and urban planning ==
=== Characteristics ===
Brynów-Osiedle Zgrzebnioka is a district predominantly characterized by single-family residential buildings arranged in a regular street grid. The southern part of the district is especially residential in character. Multi-family residential buildings, including those with modern architectural forms, are located south of Gawronów Street. In 2007, the built-up area of Brynów-Osiedle Zgrzebnioka accounted for 22% of the total area, with a floor area ratio of 0.35, and the average number of building floors in the district was 1.59. For the Ptasie Estate, these figures were 19%, 0.30, and 1.10, respectively.

=== Architectural and urban development ===
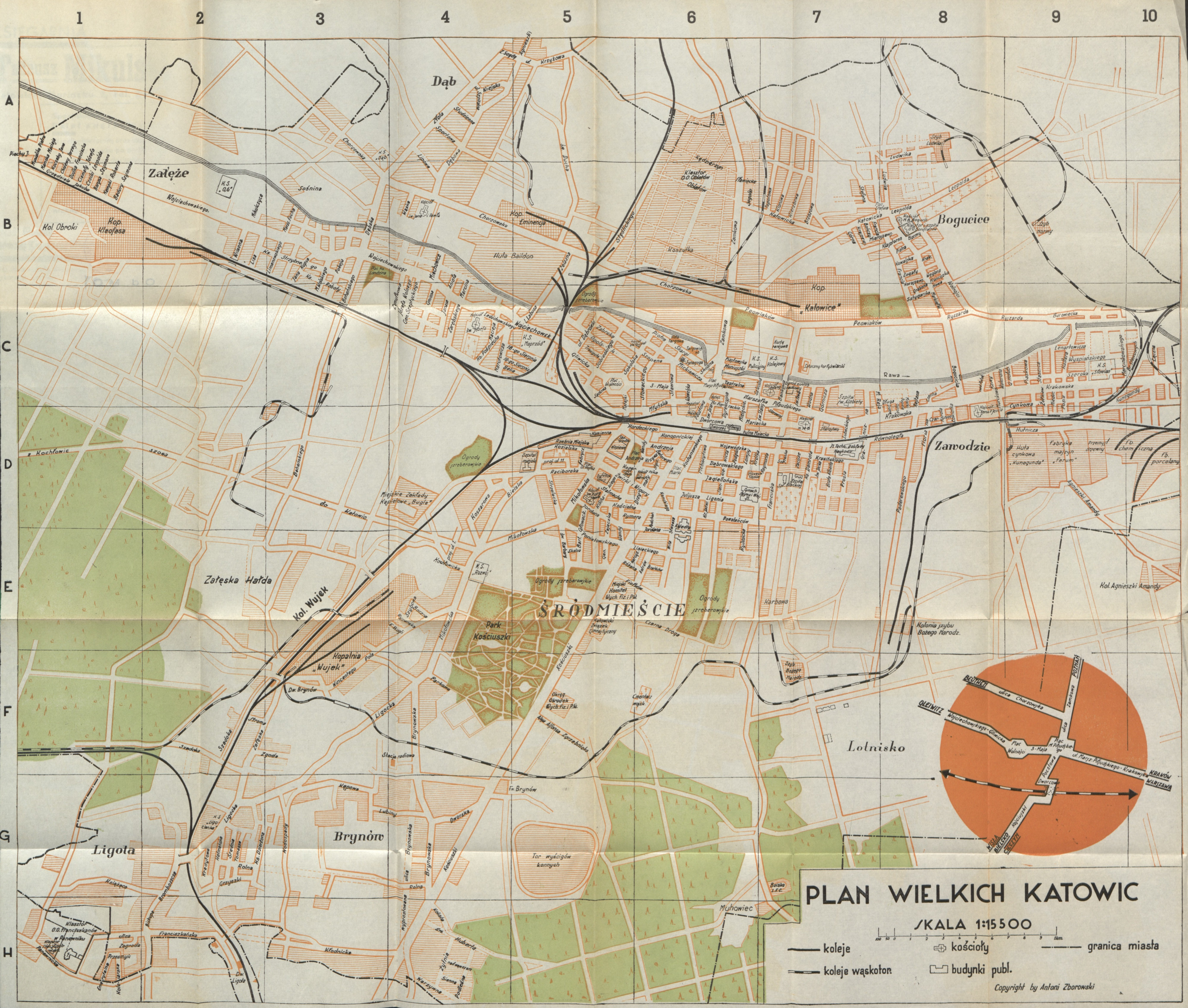
Plan of Greater Katowice from 1939, with Brynów located in the south

Historically, until 1754, Brynów was characterized by scattered rural settlements. At that time, a manor was also located there. The compact village of Brynów began to take shape in the 18th and 19th centuries along streets such as Dworska and Brynowska. Between 1865 and 1922, Brynów and Katowicka Hałda saw a process of increasing urbanization. In 1899, the Oheim coal mine was opened, and with the expansion of the facility, new residential houses were built, mainly around Katowicka Hałda. Further development of the central part of Brynów was hindered by the existing manor.

In the early 20th century, a series of houses were built between Mikołowska Street and Kościuszko Park for the staff of the Oheim coal mine. Twin villas were located at 118–148 Mikołowska Street. A colony of 8 houses, known as "the twins", was built for the mine officials starting in 1910. This colony was constructed in an area prone to mining damage, so a loose building structure was adopted.

In 1903, on Beata Hill, within the present Kościuszko Park, a 20-meter-high Bismarck Tower (Bismarckturm) was erected. It was officially opened on 20 August 1903. In 1922, the Prussian eagle was removed from the tower and replaced with an image of Józef Piłsudski. In 1925, a medallion featuring Tadeusz Kościuszko was mounted on the tower. In 1933, the tower was demolished, and the medallion was placed on a monument in the central part of the park.

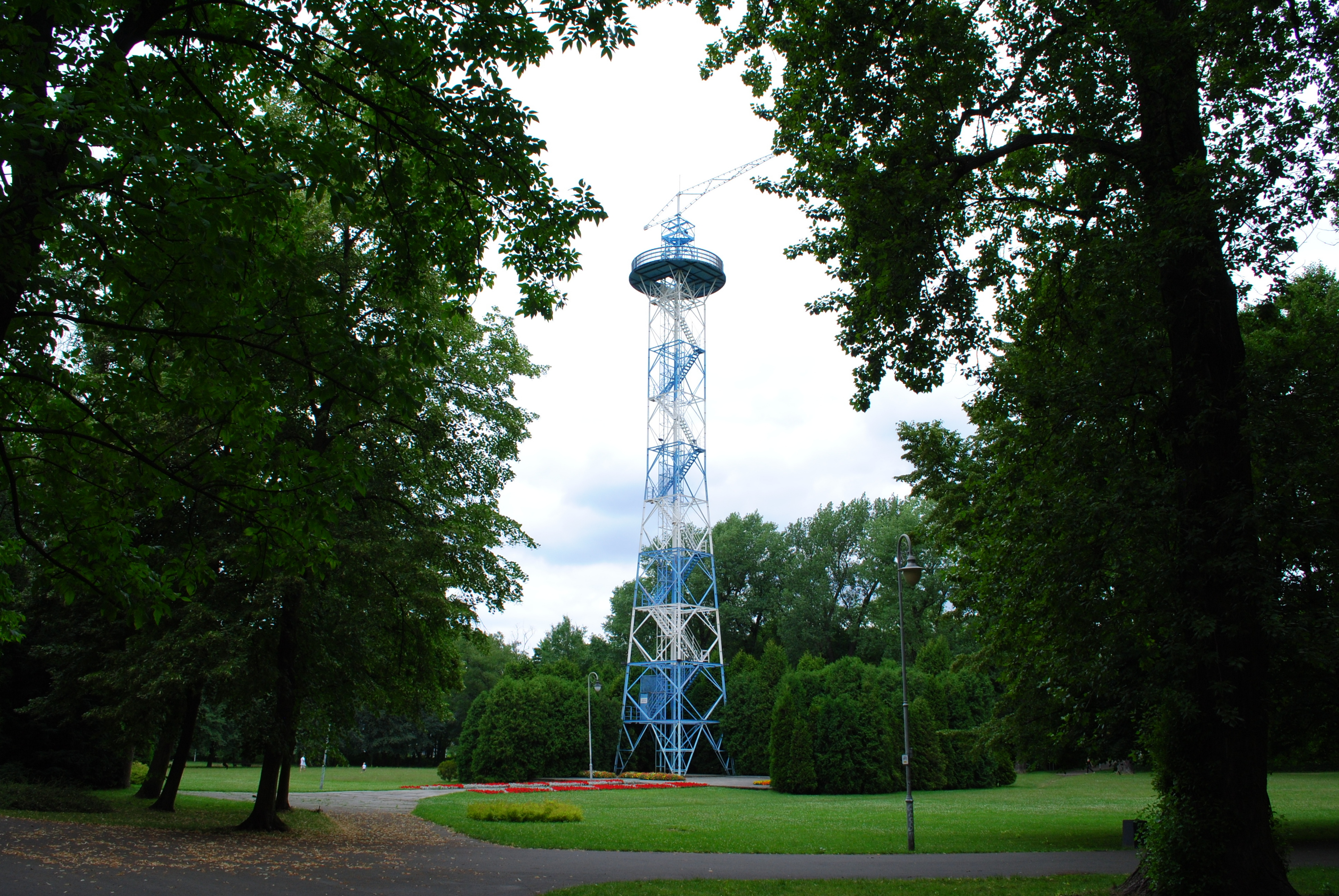
Parachute Tower located in Kościuszko Park

In the 1920s, a military cemetery was established on the site of the former prisoner-of-war cemetery from 1917, located between Meteorologów and Ceglana streets. The cemetery covers an area of 1.463 hectares. On the eastern side of the cemetery, in 1963, the Monument to the Unknown Soldier and Silesian Insurgent was erected. Among those buried here are figures such as Robert Oszek, Józef Alojzy Gawrych, Stanisław Mastalerz, Antoni Walczak, and Karol Orliński. In 1937, the Parachute Tower was built in Kościuszko Park. However, in the 1940s, the tower was destroyed by German occupiers, and a replica was later constructed in the park. In 1957, a memorial plaque was placed in honor of scouts who died at the top of the tower during the defense of Katowice at the beginning of World War II.

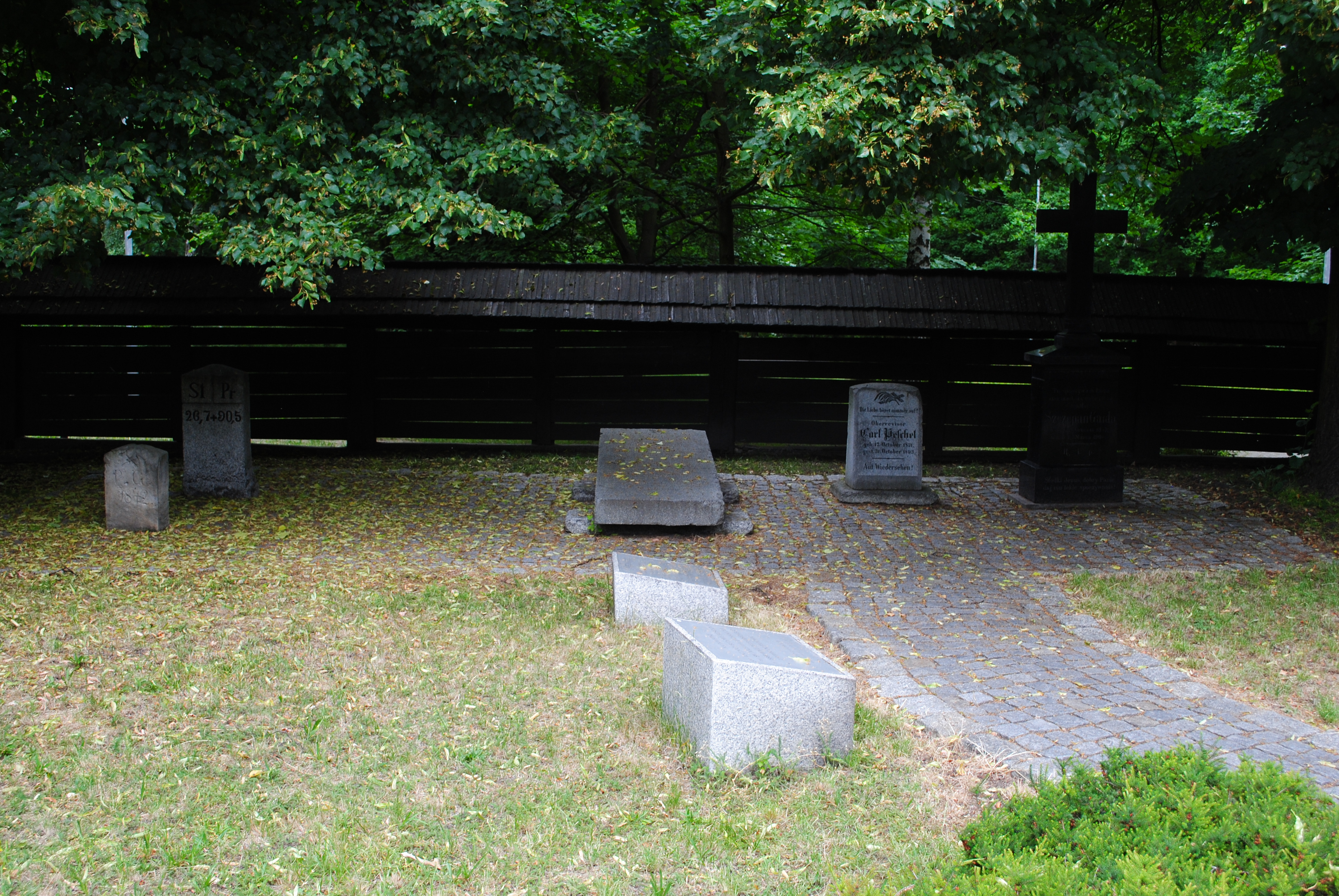
Fragment of the lapidarium near the Church of St. Michael the Archangel

On the summit of Beata Hill, where the Bismarck Tower had been demolished, the Church of St. Michael the Archangel was relocated from Syrynia in 1938. The church is the oldest structure in the district and in all of Katowice, having been built in 1510. It is a wooden, single-nave building with a small bell tower. Nearby, there is a bell tower from 1679. This complex was registered as a historical monument on 9 March 1973, and in 2009, a lapidarium was established next to the church.

During the era of the Polish People's Republic, Brynów already had a dense residential development.

In the early 1950s, at 90 Kościuszko Street, the Park Hall was constructed. Designed by Professor Stefan Bryła in the style of Neoclassical Art Deco, the hall was used for various purposes, including as a concert hall, ice rink, sports arena, and cinema.

In the 1960s, the so-called Brynów A Estate was developed, featuring single-family homes between Brynowska and Kościuszko streets. During the same period, another single-family housing estate, Brynów B, was built. This estate became known as Ptasie Estate, named after the streets on which it was located. It was constructed east of Kościuszko Street and north of St. Hubert Street. In the Ptasie Estate area, near Drozdów Street, the so-called "professors' houses" were built.

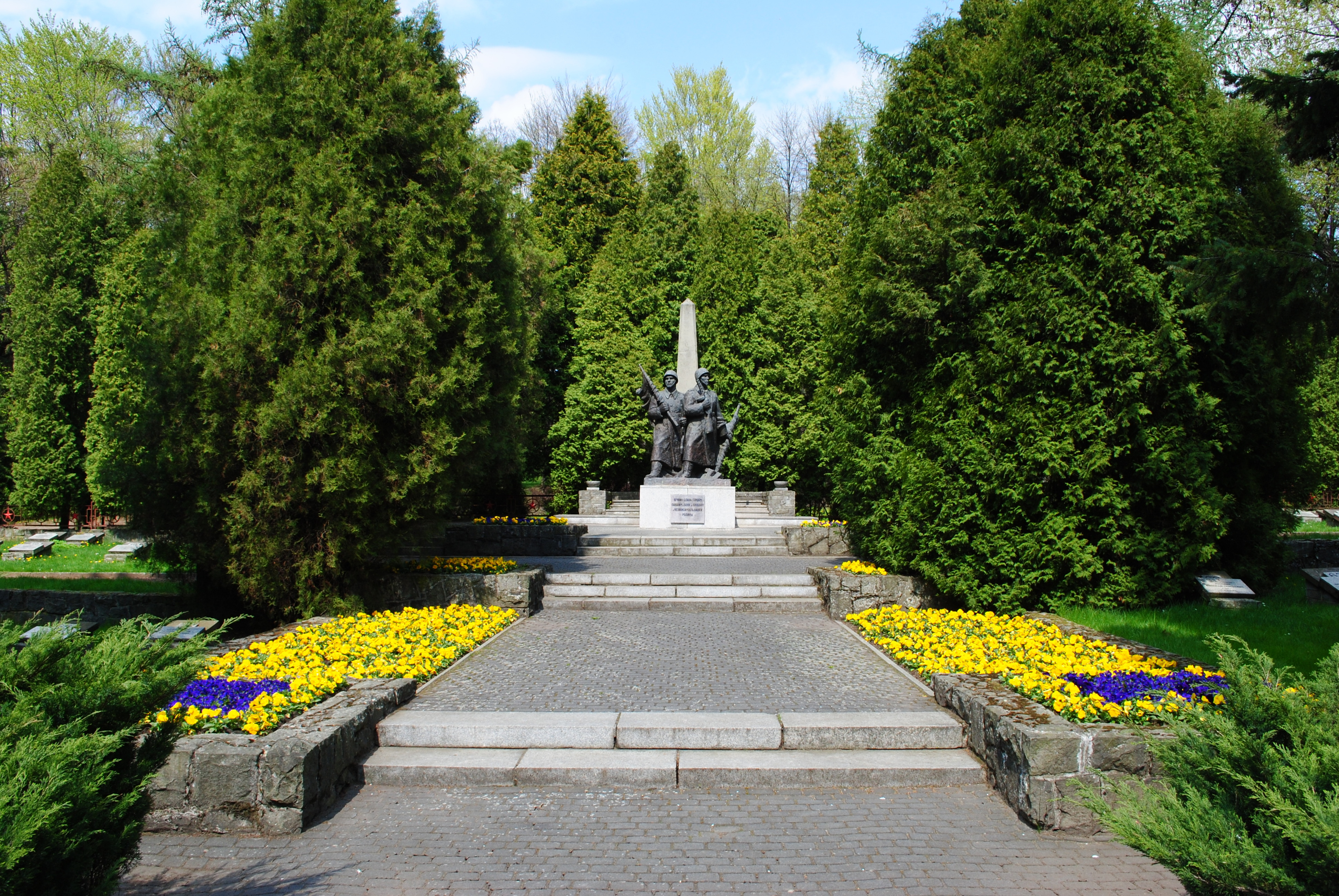
Fragment of the Red Army Soldiers' Cemetery in Kościuszko Park

In 1967, a Soviet soldiers' cemetery was relocated to Kościuszko Park. The remains, initially resting near the Monument of Silesian Insurgents since 1945, were moved to their current location during the construction of the monument. In the 1970s, high-rise residential buildings were constructed in the area around Brynowska Street. In 1978, as part of road infrastructure expansion, one of the oldest buildings of the Katowicka Hałda area, the common house of the Beate mine, was demolished. The mine operated intermittently from 1801 to 1880.

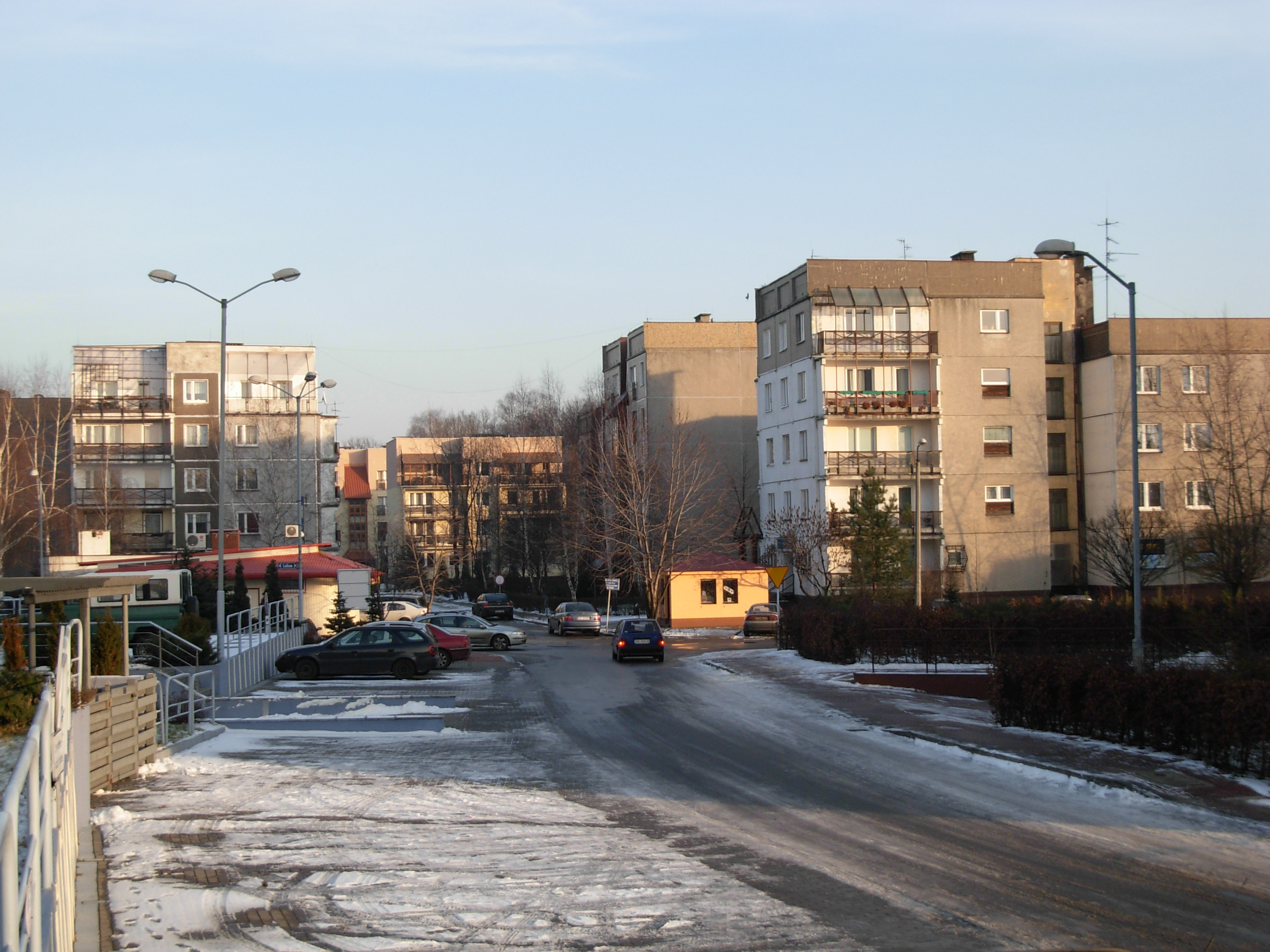
Part of A. Zgrzebniok Estate

In 1978, construction of the Alfons Zgrzebniok Estate began on the site of the former Brynów farmstead. The estate was planned to house 3,500 residents. The first apartments were completed and occupied in 1979, with the first phase of construction finished by 1985. This phase included buildings near Zgrzebniok, Kościuszko, and Gawronów streets. The second phase, completed in 1994, focused on the areas around Lelków and Zimorodków streets, while in the early 2000s, the area near Wróbli and Czajek streets, once part of the Brynów farmstead, was developed. The estate consists of three- and four-story apartment blocks made of large concrete panels. It was designed by Tadeusz Czerwiński, Andrzej Gałkowski, and Dieter Paleta, and is managed by the Katowice Housing Cooperative.

After 1989, Brynów saw significant growth in residential development and the construction of new public buildings. One such building was the Church of the Exaltation of the Holy Cross, located at 8 Piękna Street. Built between 1987 and 1991, the church was designed by Jerzy Kubica and Jacek Machnikowski. The church is two-story, and in 1996, the Stations of the Cross, designed by Witold Pałka, were added to its interior.

In 1992, a plot of land was purchased for the construction of a complex with a church dedicated to the Mother Church of the Immaculate Dawn of Freedom. The construction took place in stages, with the first phase being the construction of a rotunda with the Chapel of Christ the Servant and an adjacent amphitheater with 200 seats. In the autumn of 1996, the foundations for the church were laid, and its consecration took place on 25 September 2001. The church was designed by Andrzej Gałkowski in 1990. It has a usable area of 552 m^{2} and a volume of 13,755 m^{3}. The design concept emphasized the church's location in an open green space, distinct from the surrounding residential area. The church is further isolated from the street by L-shaped buildings, which serve as catechetical, residential, and utility pavilions.

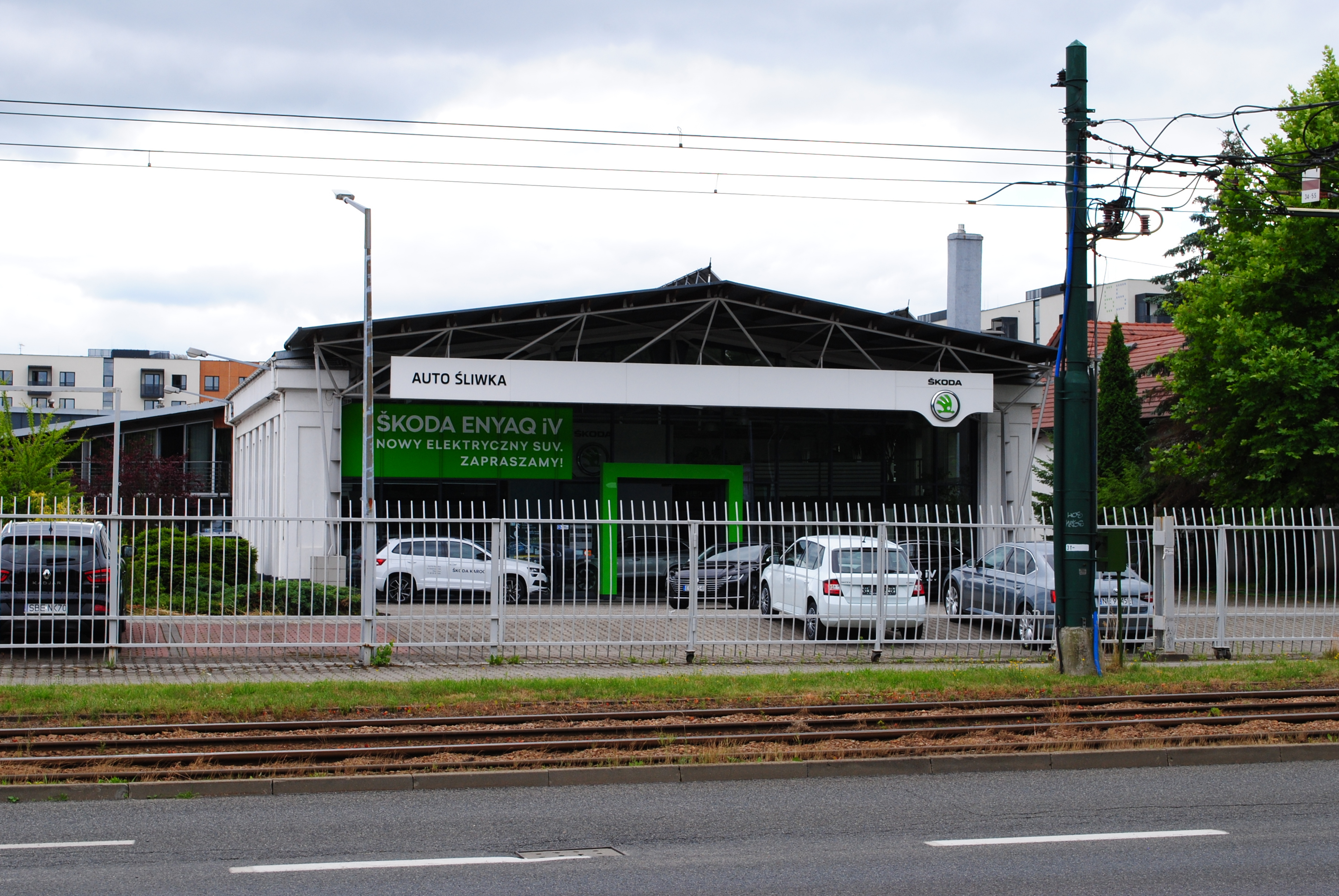
Former tram depot hall (94 T. Kościuszko Street), converted between 1996 and 1998 into a car showroom

On behalf of the Katowice Housing Cooperative, a residential complex was built in the area of Lelków and Cyranek streets. The project for the buildings was developed between 1996 and 1998, with construction taking place from 1997 to 1999. The design was created by Tadeusz Czerwiński. Between 1996 and 1998, a former tram depot building from around 1912 at 94 T. Kościuszko Street was renovated and converted into a Škoda car dealership. The renovation was carried out by Mirosław Polak and Marek Skwara. In 2000, a residential complex was built at 8–10 Łabędzia Street, designed by a team of architects led by Andrzej Gałkowski.

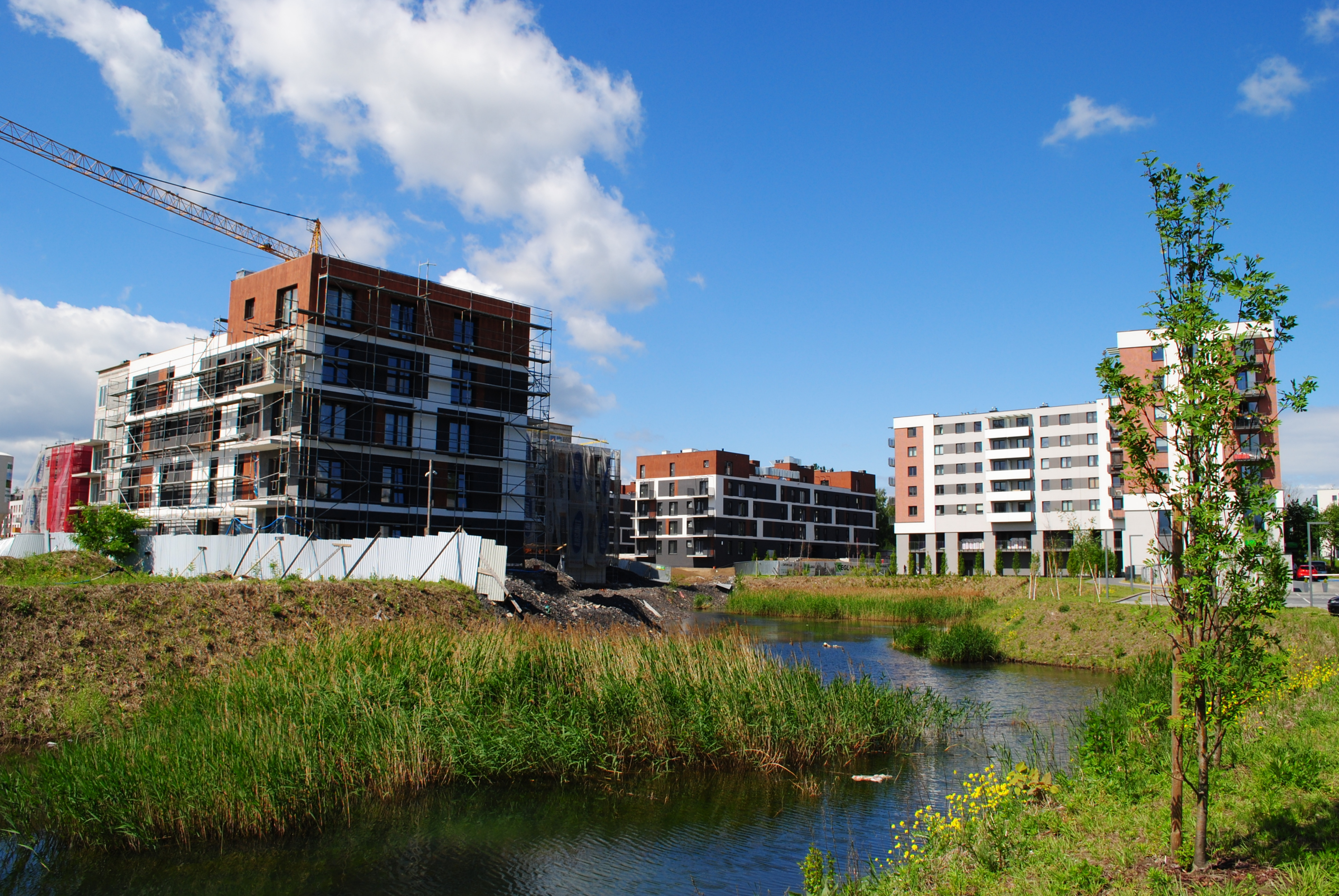
Ceglana Park Estate during construction (May 2022); view from Ceglana Street

In March 2014, the Wille Parkowa residential complex, located at 1 Parkowa Street, was completed. The complex consists of five buildings containing a total of 32 residential units. The investor of the development was GC Investment, and the design was created by a team of architects from Konior Studio, led by Tomasz Konior. The architects designed five simple building volumes integrated into the existing mature tree landscape, creating a compact residential ensemble around a small square. Each of these buildings, while maintaining a similar style, features unique details such as individually shaped entry shades, facade colors, and window placements. The design of the building complex was developed between 2011 and 2012, with construction taking place between 2012 and 2014.

In May 2014, the sculpture from the Monument of Gratitude to the Soviet Army was removed from its pedestal at Freedom Square and after renovation at the Gliwickie Zakłady Urządzeń Technicznych, it was relocated to the Soviet soldiers' cemetery in Kościuszko Park.

The Ceglana and Meteorologów streets became focal points for new residential developments. Several new housing estates were built here, including Nowe Ptasie (construction from 2018 to 2020), Zdrowe Stylove (construction from 2019 to 2021), and Ceglana Park (construction started in April 2019).

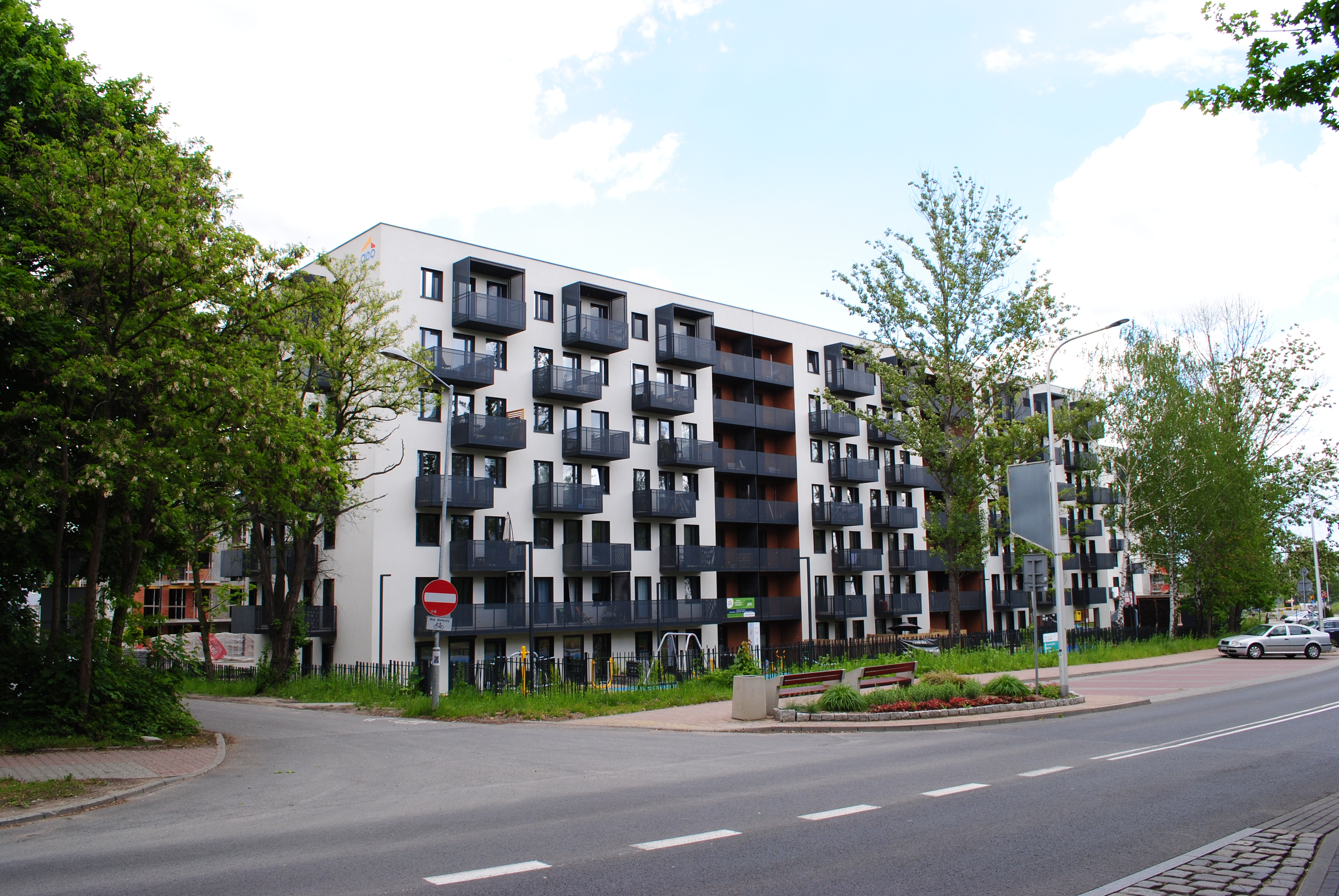
Part of Zdrowe Stylove Estate in the area of Ceglana Street

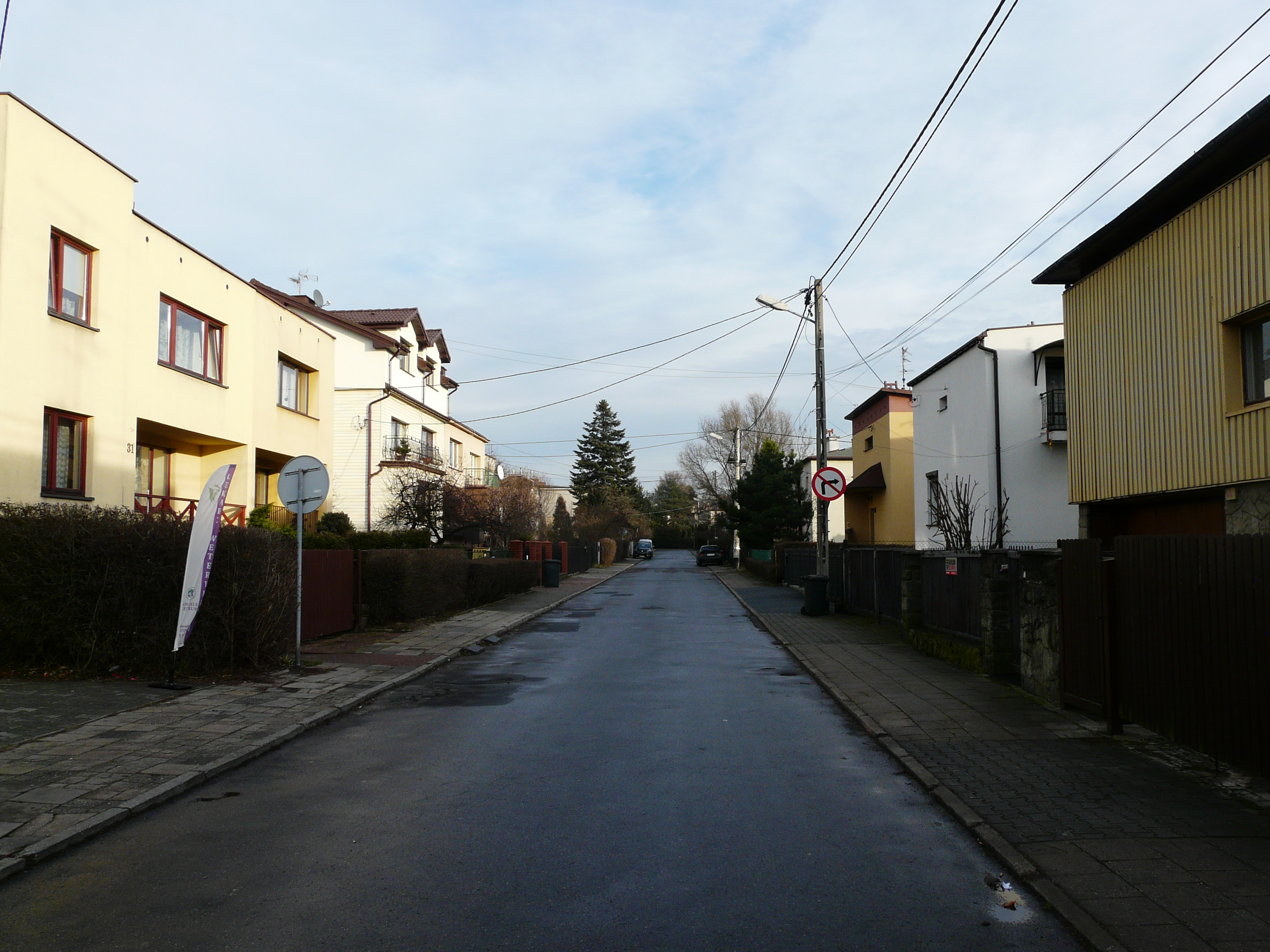
Part of Ptasie Estate in the area of Słowików Street

=== Estates, settlements, and colonies ===
- Ceglana Park Estate – a residential estate located in the area of Ceglana, Meteorologów, and Porfirowa streets. The development plans include a total of 9 multi-family buildings with 780 residential units.
- Kamionka – a former workers' colony situated at the border of Śródmieście and Brynów-Osiedle Zgrzebnioka. It consisted of eight houses, and before World War I, villas for the mining supervisory staff of the Oheim mine were built in the area.
- Katowicka Hałda – a part of Katowice located at the border of Załęska Hałda, Brynów-Osiedle Zgrzebnioka, and Śródmieście. Originally a hamlet of Katowice, it later became part of Brynów village. The settlement developed rapidly after the opening of the Oheim mine.
- St. Hubert Colony – a workers' colony located in the area of St. Hubert and Pawia streets, consisting of houses built around 1943.
- Colony of Wujek Mine – a residential colony built for mine officials, consisting of eight villas in a garden along 118–148 Mikołowska Street.
- Muchowiec – a part of Katowice located at the Brynów-Osiedle Zgrzebnioka (Muchowiec Street) and Osiedle Paderewskiego – Muchowiec. It is a recreational area.
- Nowe Ptasie Estate – a residential estate located near Meteorologów Street. It consists of six multi-family buildings with a total of 235 apartments, including commercial and service units on the ground floor.
- Ptasie Estate – a residential estate located around Drozdów, Kukułek, Szpaków, Słowików, and other bird-named streets. The development mainly consists of ownership single-family houses.
- Alfons Zgrzebniok Estate – a residential estate located near A. Zgrzebniok and T. Kościuszko streets. It features multi-storey apartment blocks and single-family homes.
- Zdrowe Stylove Estate – a residential estate located near Ceglana Street, designed to include four multi-family buildings with a total of 520 apartments.

=== Monuments and historical sites ===
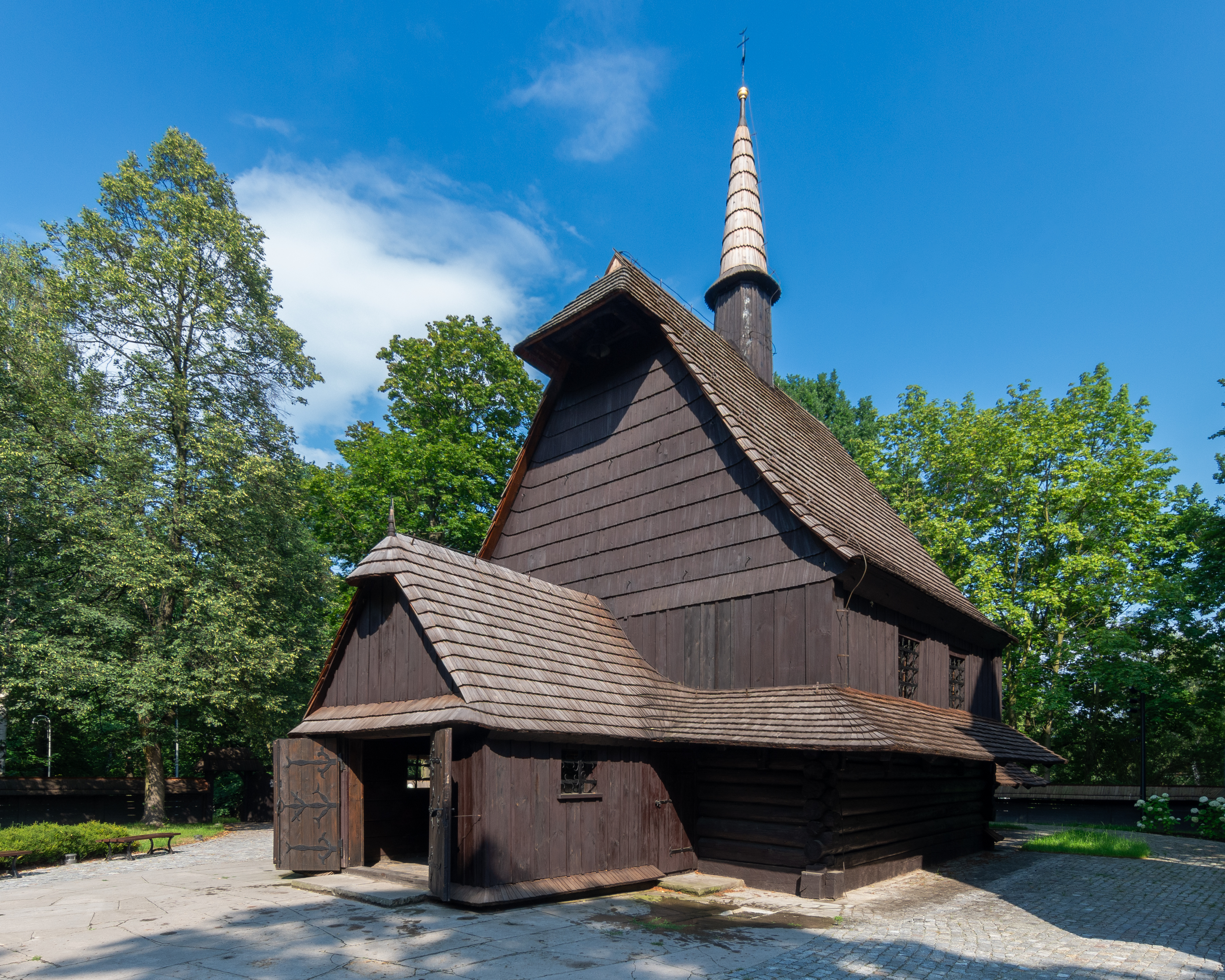
Historic Church of St. Michael the Archangel from the 16th century

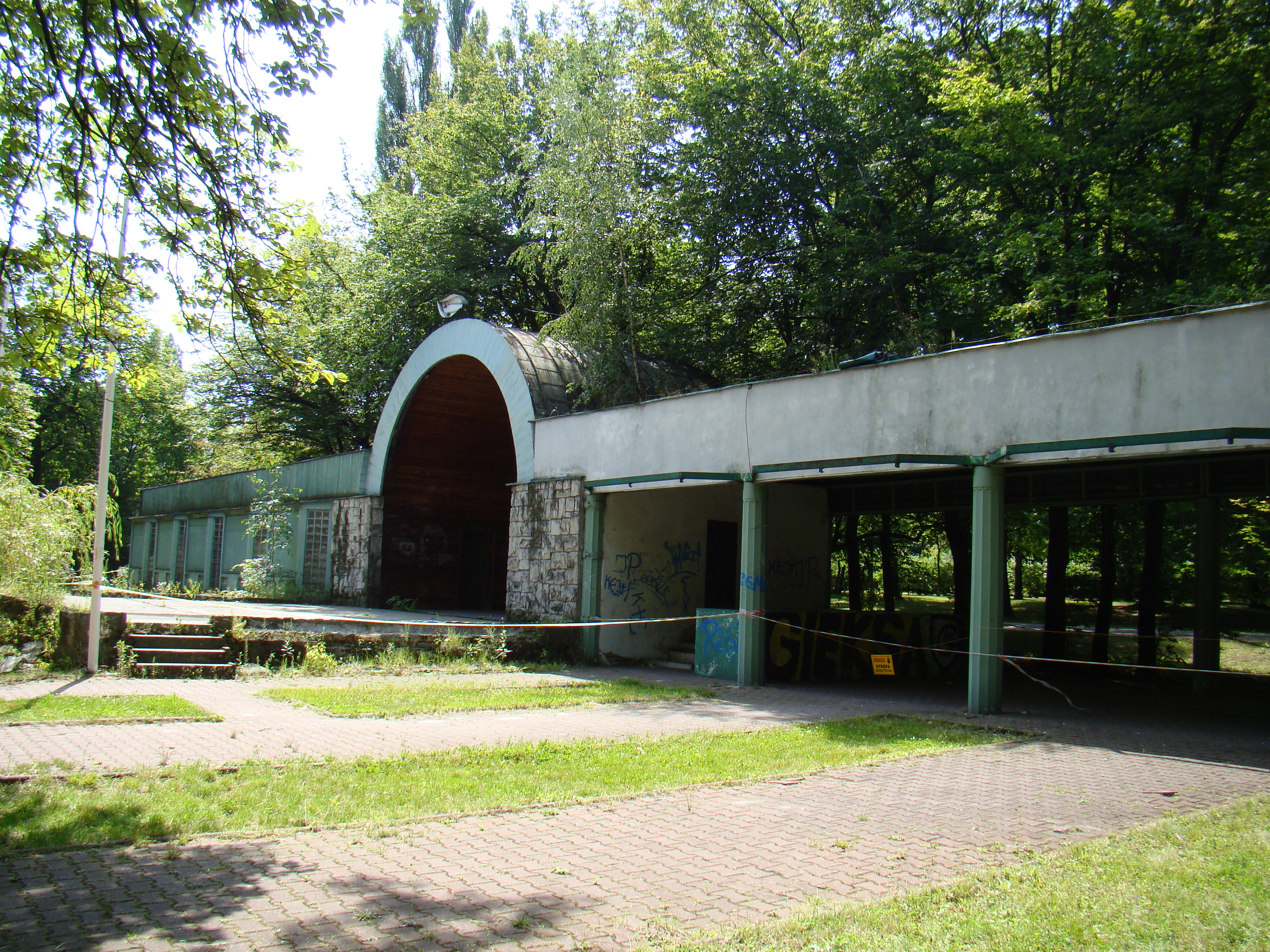
Historic concert hall in Kościuszko Park

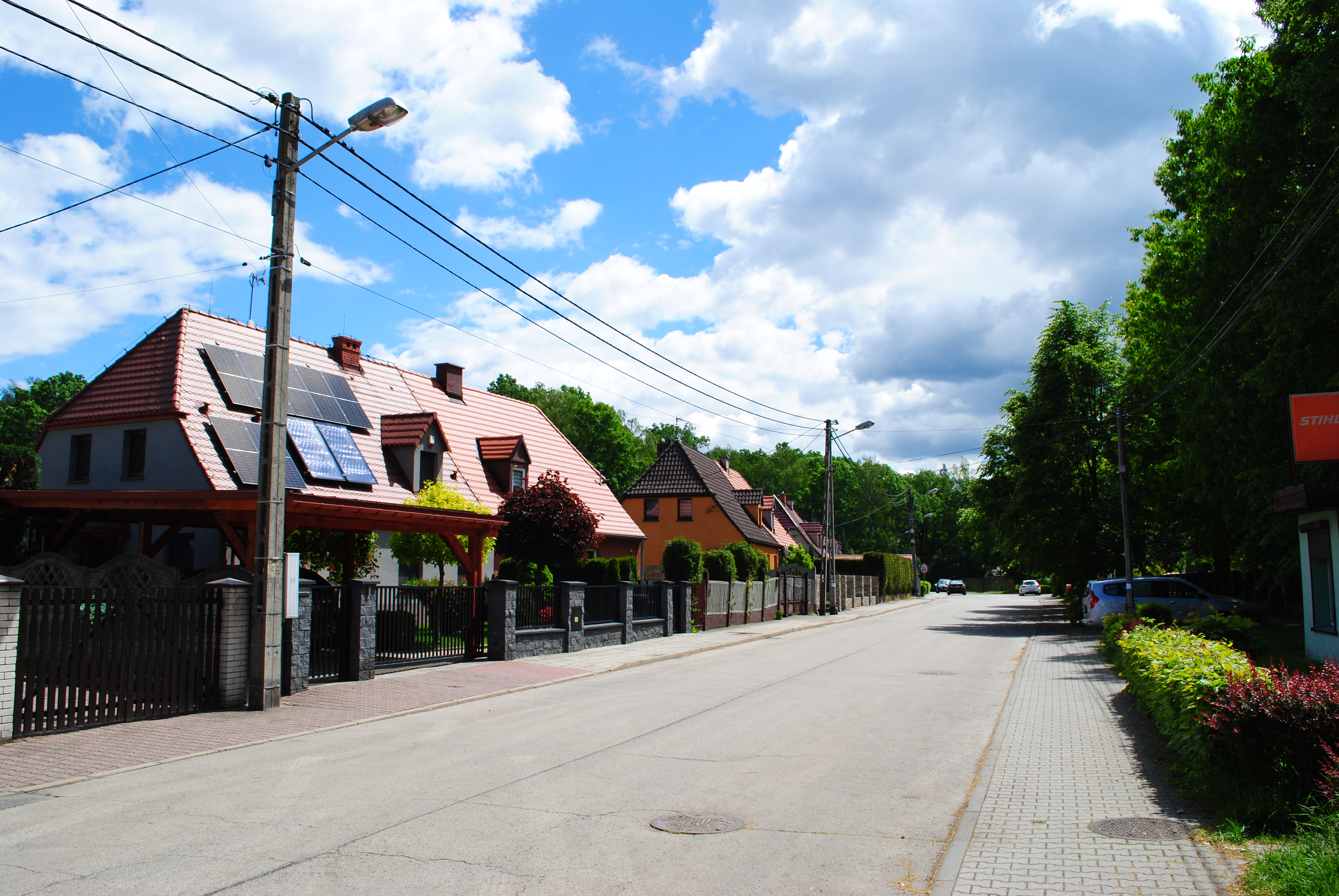
Fragment of the St. Hubert workers' colony

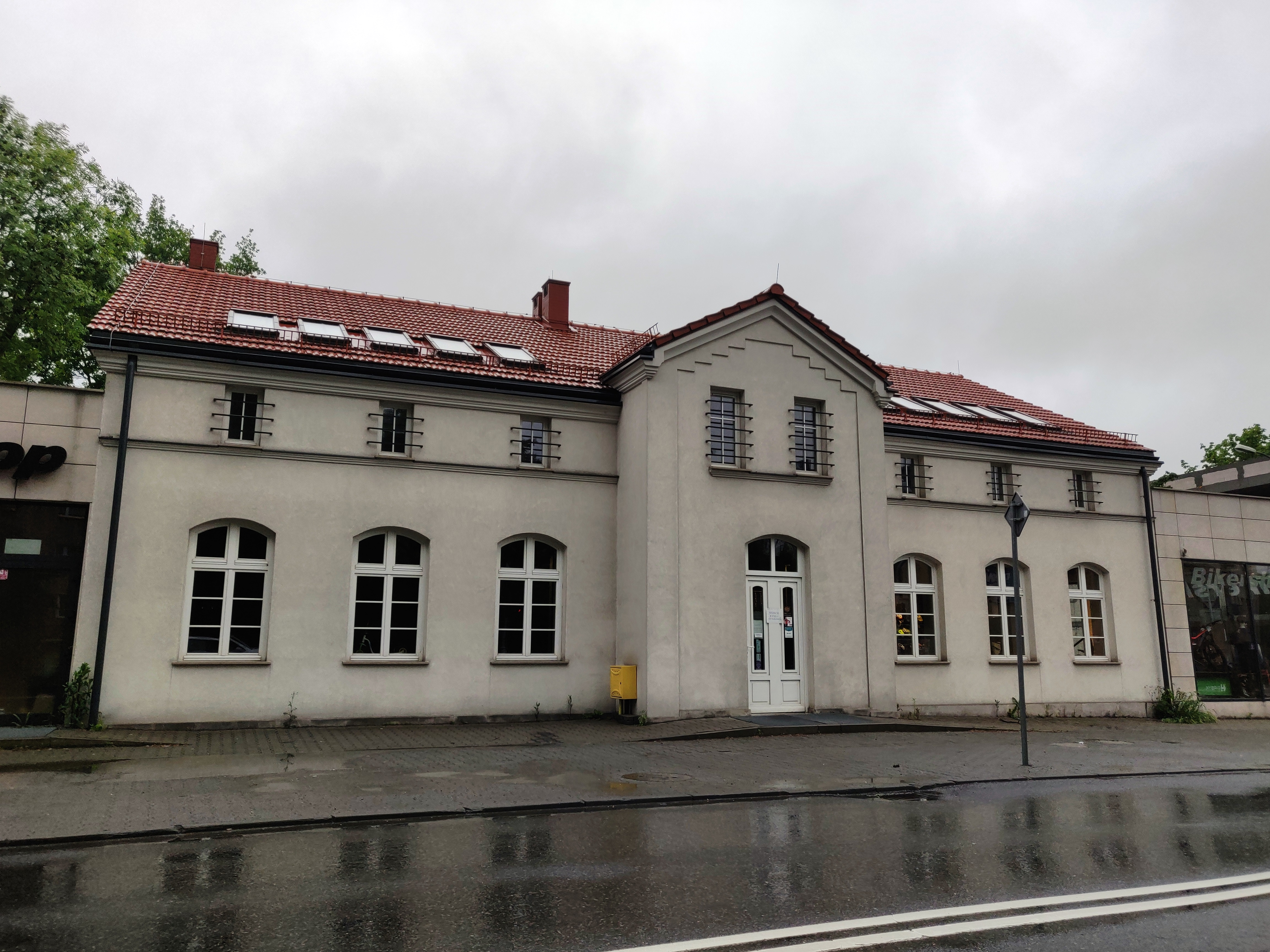
Reconstructed building at 52 Brynowska Street from the early 20th century – former Singer restaurant

In Brynów-Osiedle Zgrzebnioka, the following historical sites are registered as cultural heritage monuments in the Silesian Voivodeship:

- Filial Church of St. Michael the Archangel (located in Kościuszko Park) – a wooden church from the 16th century, with a wooden bell tower; registered under number 1179/71 from 9 March 1971.
- Kościuszko Park (including Tadeusz Kościuszko Street, Górnośląska Avenue, and Piękna Street), featuring the Soviet soldiers' cemetery, the concert hall (built in 1927), the Parachute Tower (built in 1937), and the gazebo (also from 1937) – registered under number A/1515/93 from 26 February 1993.In the eastern part of Brynów-Osiedle Zgrzebnioka, the following objects are protected based on the local zoning plans, as well as objects proposed for protection:
- Building (13 Krzemienna Street) from the 1930s in the International Style
- Former brickworks building (8 Ceglana Street) from the early 20th century
- Former Singer restaurant building (52 Brynowska Street) from the early 20th century
- Buildings (30 and 32 St. Hubert Street) from 1958 in the socialist realism style
- Former tram depot (94 T. Kościuszko Street), converted into a car showroom
- House in a garden (1 Parkowa Street)
- Houses (23 and 25 St. Hubert Street) from the 1930s in the International Style
- Houses from the St. Hubert workers' colony (36/38, 40/42, 44/46, 48/50, 52/54, 56/58 St. Hubert Street; 1, 3, 5, 2/4, 6/8, 7, 11, 15 Pawia Street) from around 1943
- Manor (138 T. Kościuszko Street) from the mid-19th century, in the classical style, consisting of a brick residential building and an outbuilding
- Park Hall (90 T. Kościuszko Street)
- Buildings of the former brickworks of the Wujek Coal Mine (67a and 67b Ceglana Street) from the early 20th century, built in the modernist style
- Tenement house (57 Brynowska Street) from the interwar period, in the International Style
- Tenement house – familok (76 Brynowska Street) in the historicism style
- Forest lodge (181 Gawronów/Francuska Street)
- Villa – former supervisor's house of the Wujek Coal Mine (19 St. Hubert Street), built in the 1920s in the modernist style
- Twin villas in a garden (118/120, 122/124, 126/128, 130/132, 134/136, 138/140, 142/144, 146/148 Mikołowska Street) from the early 20th century in the modernist style
- Villas in a garden (11, 12, 13, 14 Krzemienna Street; 4a Lubiny Street)
- Villas (182, 186, 188, 190 T. Kościuszko Street) from the 1920s and 1930s in the late modernist style
- Ensemble of five villas in gardens (4, 4a, 4b Parkowa Street; 150, 152 Mikołowska Street) from the interwar period in the International Style

In the district, the following conservation zones or proposed areas for protection are present:

- Park Hall, rebuilt in the 1950s
- Ensemble of villas (13 Krzemienna Street) from the 1930s
- Military cemetery (Meteorologów Street) from the interwar period
- Buildings, villas from the early 20th century and 1930s, mainly in the modernist style
- Ensemble of the former manor's buildings
- St. Hubert workers' colony – two-family houses in gardens

=== Monuments and memorial sites ===
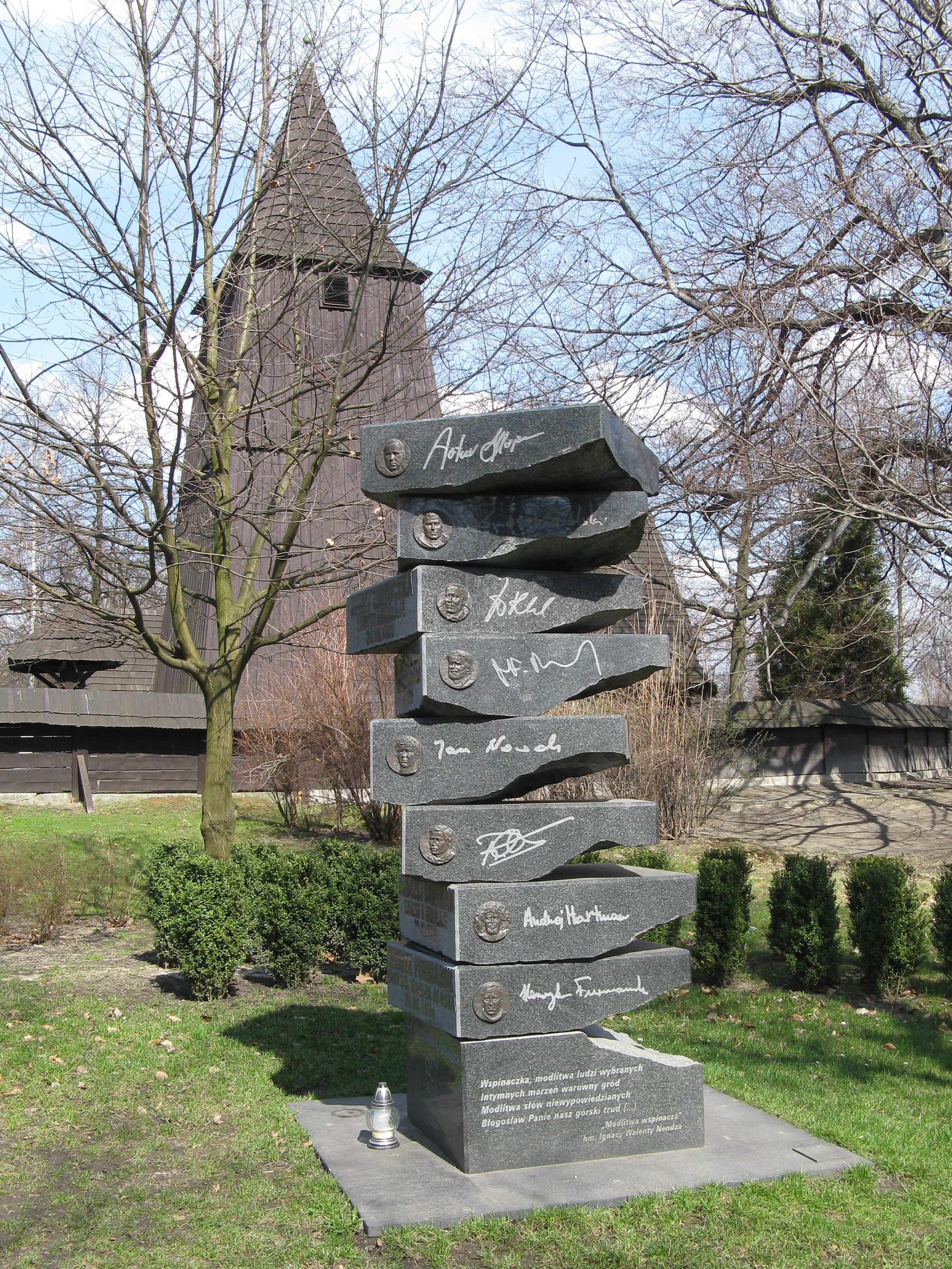
Monument to the Alpinists located in Kościuszko Park

In the eastern part of Brynów-Osiedle Zgrzebnioka, the following monuments and memorial sites can be found:

- Four plots with war graves from the World War I (Meteorologów Street; military cemetery)
- Grave of Józef A. Gawrych (family burial), participant in the Greater Poland Uprising, the Silesian Uprisings, and the Warsaw Uprising (Meteorologów Street; military cemetery)
- Grave of Stanisław Mastalerz, commander of the Stefan Batory 4th Toszek-Gliwice Infantry Regiment during the Third Silesian Uprising (Meteorologów Street; military cemetery)
- Grave of Karol Orliński, lieutenant of the 73rd Infantry Regiment and participant in the Silesian Uprisings (Meteorologów Street; military cemetery)
- Grave of Robert Oszek, navy captain and commander of the Naval Storm Unit during the Third Silesian Uprising (Meteorologów Street; military cemetery)
- Grave of Antoni Walczak, participant in the January Uprising (Meteorologów Street; military cemetery)
- Collective war grave of Allied soldiers – stone cross (Meteorologów Street; military cemetery)
- Monument to the Alpinists (Kościuszko Park; near the Church of St. Michael the Archangel) – commemorating tragically deceased climbers who were members of the High Mountain Club; unveiled on 28 October 2015 and designed by Bogumił Burzyński
- Monument to Tadeusz Kościuszko (Kościuszko Park)
- Monument to the Unknown Polish Soldier and Silesian Insurgent who gave their lives for an independent Poland (Meteorologów Street; military cemetery)
- Monument – Parachute Tower and boulder with a plaque honoring scouts who fell on 4 September 1939 in battle against Hitler's forces (Kościuszko Park)
- Memorial wall dedicated to Gustaw Morcinek (2a Kukułek Street; Gustaw Morcinek Primary School No. 65 in Katowice)
- Plaque with an urn commemorating Poles who perished in Siberia (Piękna Street; Church of the Exaltation of the Holy Cross)

== Education ==
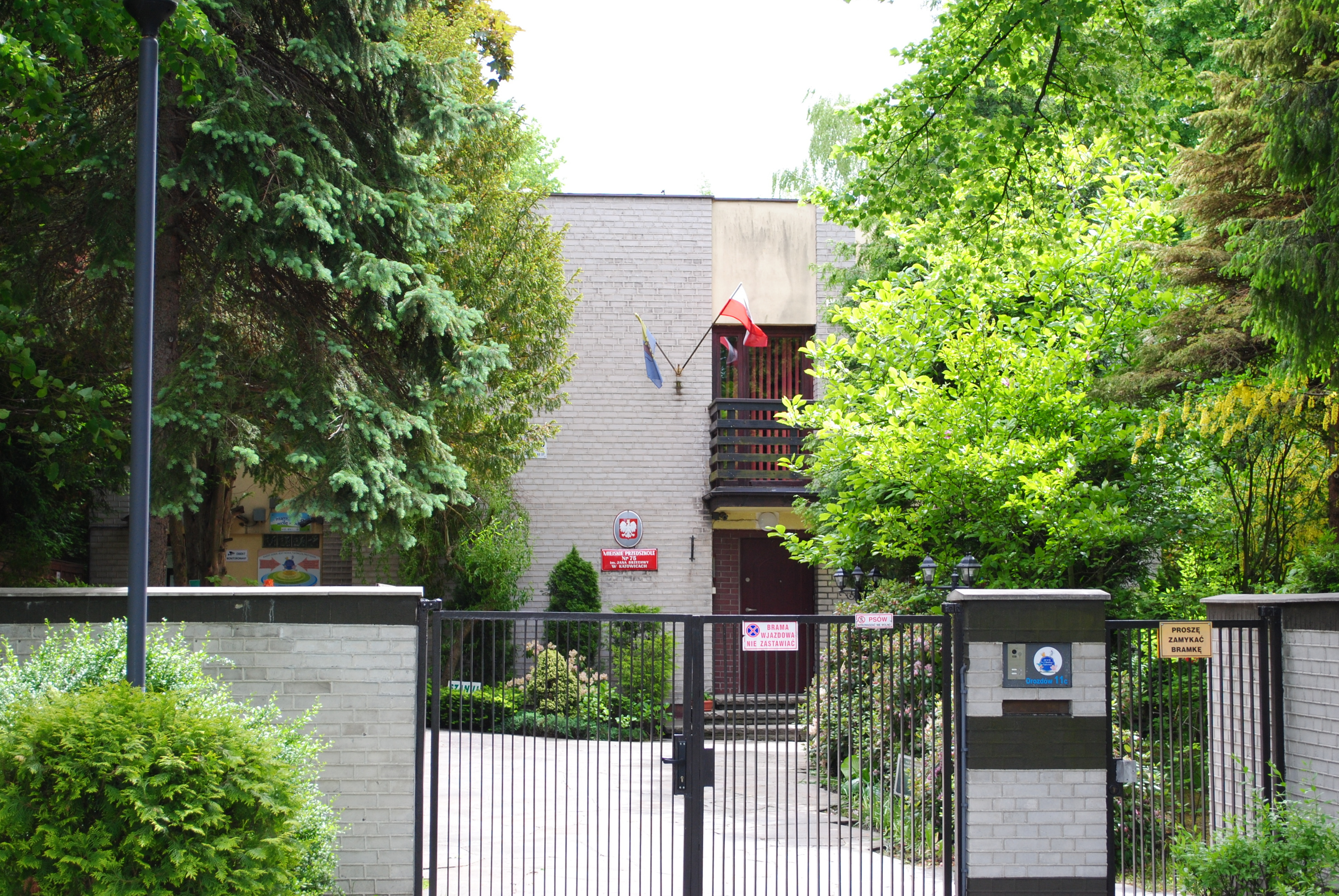
Building of Jan Brzechwa Municipal Kindergarten No. 75 (11c Drozdów Street)

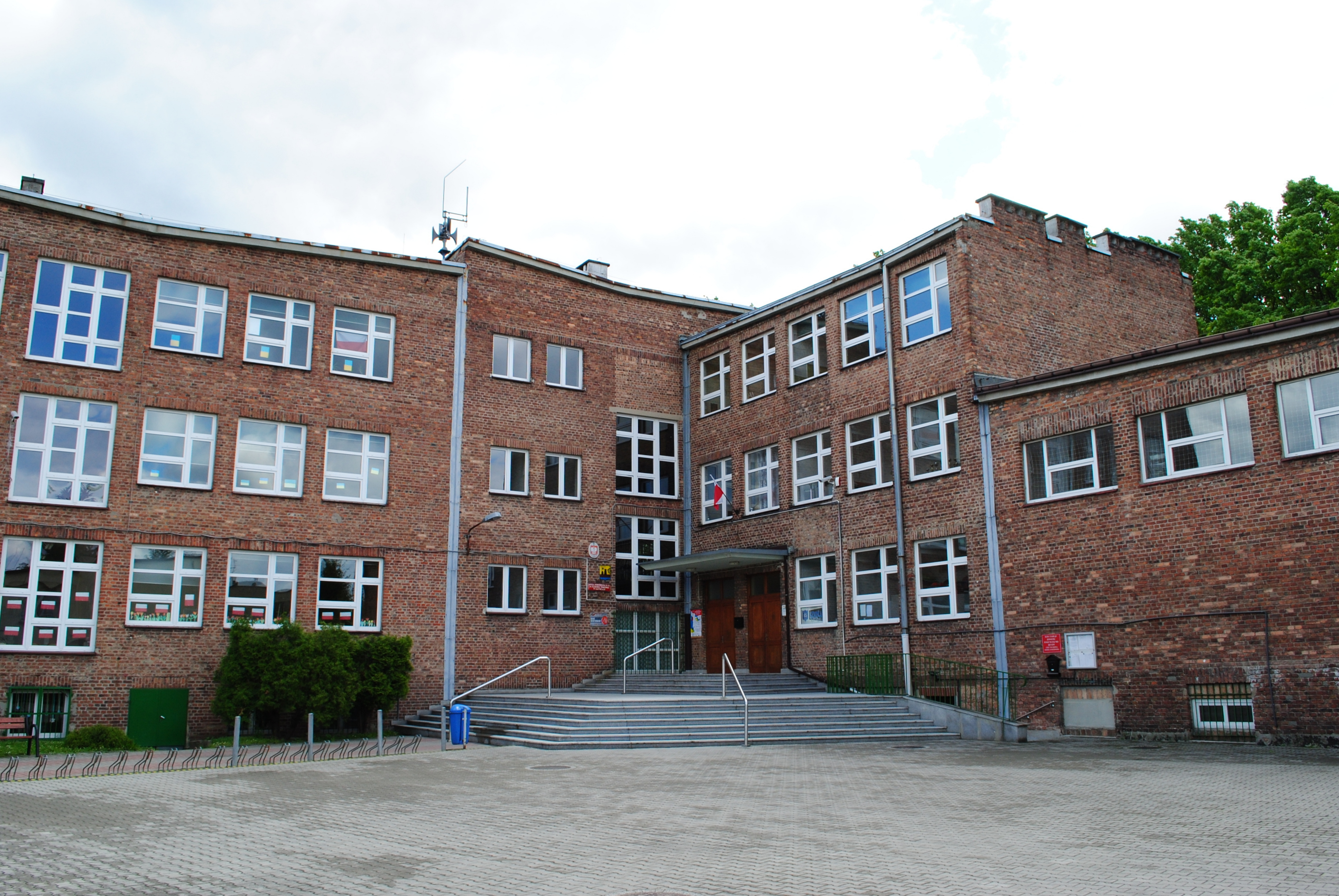
Premises of Gustaw Morcinek Primary School No. 65 (2a Kukułek Street)

As of early 2023, the following educational and childcare institutions were located in Brynów-Osiedle Zgrzebnioka:

- Nurseries and kindergartens:
  - Hans Christian Andersen Municipal Kindergarten No. 1 in Katowice (82 Brynowska Street)
  - Jan Brzechwa Municipal Kindergarten No. 75 in Katowice (11c Drozdów Street)
  - Wanda Chotomska Municipal Kindergarten No. 92 in Katowice (22 Kormoranów Street)
  - Private English-Language Montessori Kindergarten Oxford Pre School (9 Przepiórek Street)
  - Private Nursery and Kindergarten Puchatkowo (4 and 6 G. Fitelberg Street)
  - Private Nursery and Kindergarten TIKA with Integrated and Special Units (12 Dworska Street)
- Primary schools:
  - Gustaw Morcinek Primary School No. 65 in Katowice (2a Kukułek Street)

At the current location of 3 Dworska Street, in 1865, a folk school building was established on land purchased by a local farmer named Stronciwilk. This institution was the first school in Brynów. By the early 20th century, the building became insufficient to accommodate the growing number of students. Consequently, between 1912 and 1914, it was expanded according to a design by Franciszek Rudziński. In 1922, the rural school in Brynów was converted into the Polish Public School. During the interwar period, it operated as a coeducational Tadeusz Kościuszko Public School No. 29. After World War II, the building on 3 Dworska Street housed both a kindergarten and Primary School No. 11. In 1950, a new school building was constructed on 16 Nasypowa Street to accommodate the growing needs of the community, and Brynów's school was relocated there. The original building served various functions before being abandoned around 2003 and eventually demolished.

In the spring of 1960, the cornerstone for a new school was laid in the Ptasie Estate. The ceremonial opening and commissioning of the new Primary School No. 65 building took place on 1 September 1964.

== Public and social security ==
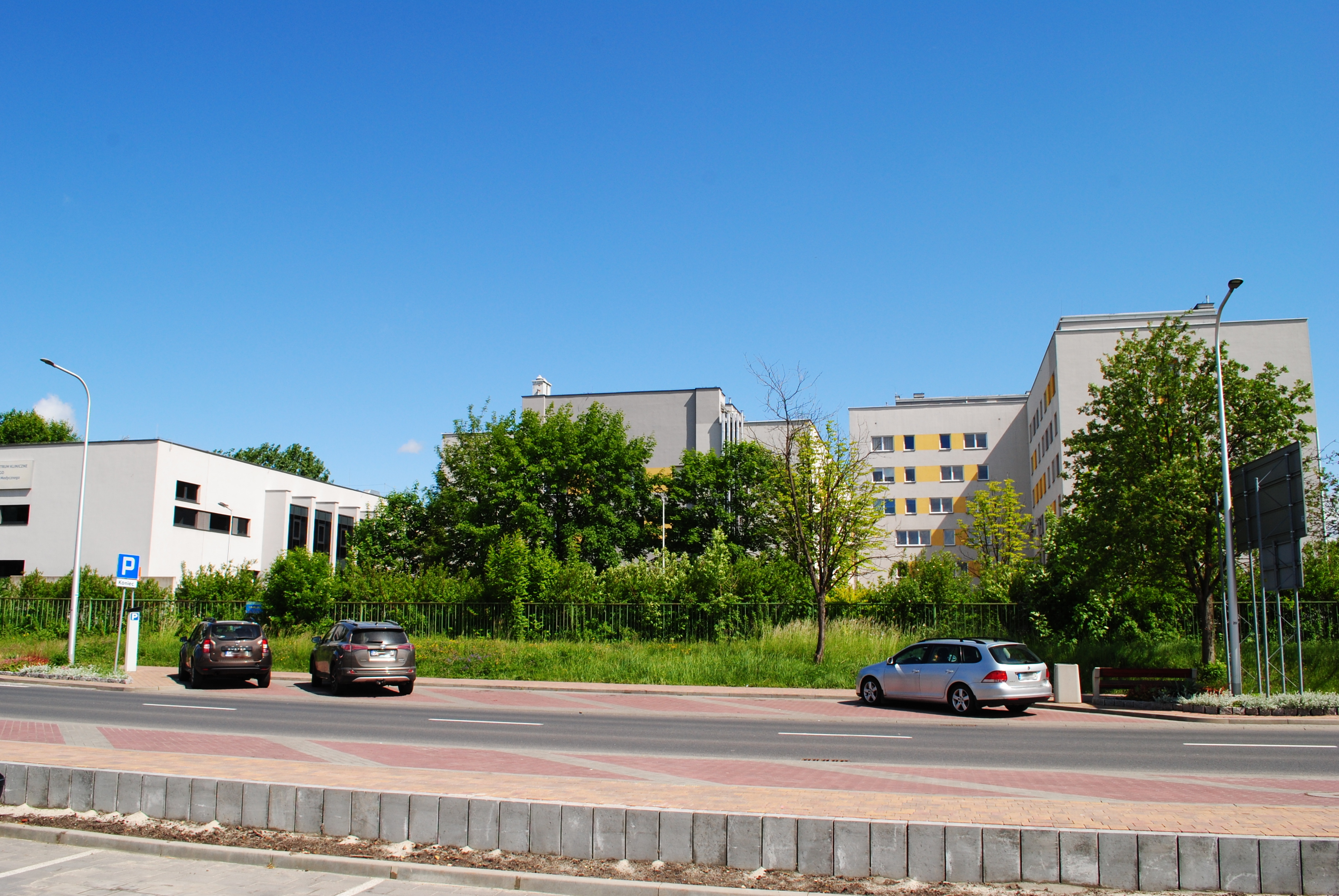
Prof. K. Gibiński University Clinical Centre of the Medical University of Silesia in Katowice (35 Ceglana Street)

In Brynów-Osiedle Zgrzebnioka, there is no dedicated police station. The area falls under the jurisdiction of Police Station IV in Katowice, located at 7 Policyjna Street in Piotrowice-Ochojec. In 2007, the district experienced 2.93 criminal acts per 100 residents. By 2013, this number rose to 275 crimes, equating to 4.1 acts per 100 residents. According to a 2011 survey conducted among 78 district residents, 52.6% felt safe in the area, while 46.2% disagreed, and 1.2% found it hard to assess the situation.

In 2007, the district recorded 18 traffic accidents, with T. Kościuszko Street being among the locations in Katowice with the highest number of accidents and collisions.

The largest healthcare facility in the district is the Prof. K. Gibiński University Clinical Centre of the Medical University of Silesia. It operates one of its two locations at 35 Ceglana Street (the other is at 14 Medyków Street in Ligota-Panewniki). This multidisciplinary hospital, established in 2016 from the merger of the University Centre of Ophthalmology and Oncology and the Central Clinical Hospital, is among the largest in the Silesian Voivodeship. It offers over 20 medical specialties.

Several private hospitals have operated or continue to operate in the area:

- EuroMedic Specialist Clinics (92 T. Kościuszko Street)
- GeoMedical (41 W. Stwosz Street) – closed since summer 2019

Other healthcare facilities in the district include the cardiology clinic Drozd (26 Drozdów Street) and the Healthy Heart Centre Telcor (10 Łabędzia Street). There is also a veterinary clinic, Animals Centre (7 Kanarków Street), specializing in the treatment of dogs, cats, rabbits, ferrets, and smaller rodents.

At 14d L. Różycki Street is the Archdiocesan Hospice Home of St. John Paul II in Katowice. This institution traces its roots back to 31 July 1997, when a 25-year lease agreement was signed for its current property. On 10 November 1998, Archbishop Damian Zimoń officially established the hospice, and on 7 December 2000, he conducted its ceremonial blessing. On 7 February 2005, the property was sold by the Katowice City Council to the Caritas of the Archdiocese of Katowice.

== Culture ==
Cultural life in the modern district of Brynów-Osiedle Zgrzebnioka began developing during the interwar period. At that time, Brynów was home to various associations, including the Tadeusz Kościuszko Singing Society, which operated from 1919 to 1953. Additionally, a branch of the People's Libraries Society functioned in Brynów during the interwar years. By 1935, it held 3,848 volumes and had 6,222 readers.

At 27 Brynowska Street, the broadcasting station for Polish Radio Katowice was established in 1927. Equipped with a 12 kW transmitter, it was the most powerful station in the country and one of the strongest in Europe at the time. Trial broadcasts began on 27 November 1927, with the station officially opening on 4 December that year.

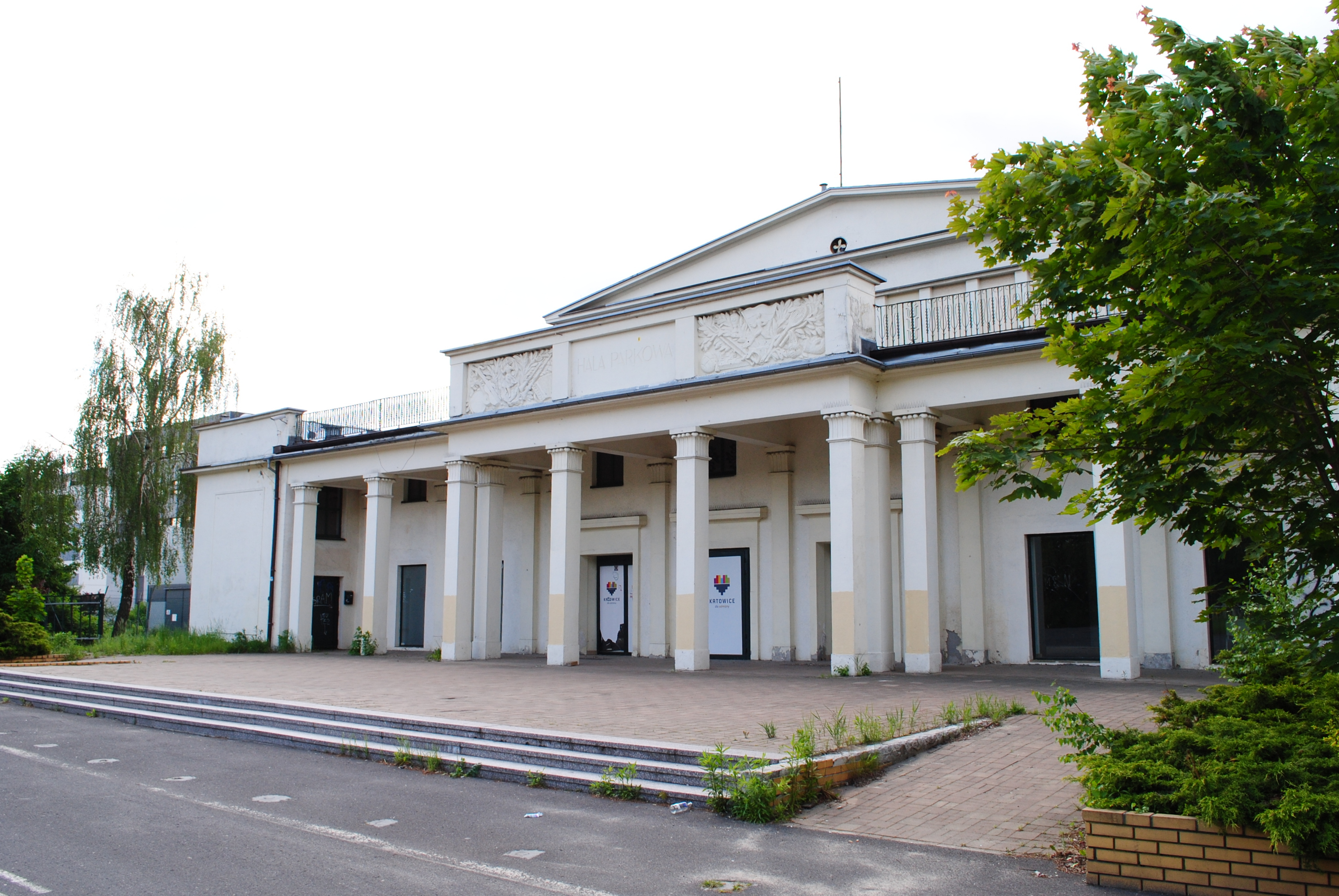
Park Hall – a key cultural venue in the district

Park Hall remains one of the most important cultural landmarks in the district. Over the years, it has served as a concert hall, ice rink, sports arena, and cinema. The hall hosted one of the first performances of the Śląsk Song and Dance Ensemble. In the 1960s and early 1970s, circus performances were regularly held in front of the hall, while during the 1970s, it hosted events as part of the International Spring of Show Business. After 1989, Park Hall shifted to commercial functions. Today, Kościuszko Park also serves as a cultural venue, hosting promenade concerts during summer Sundays.

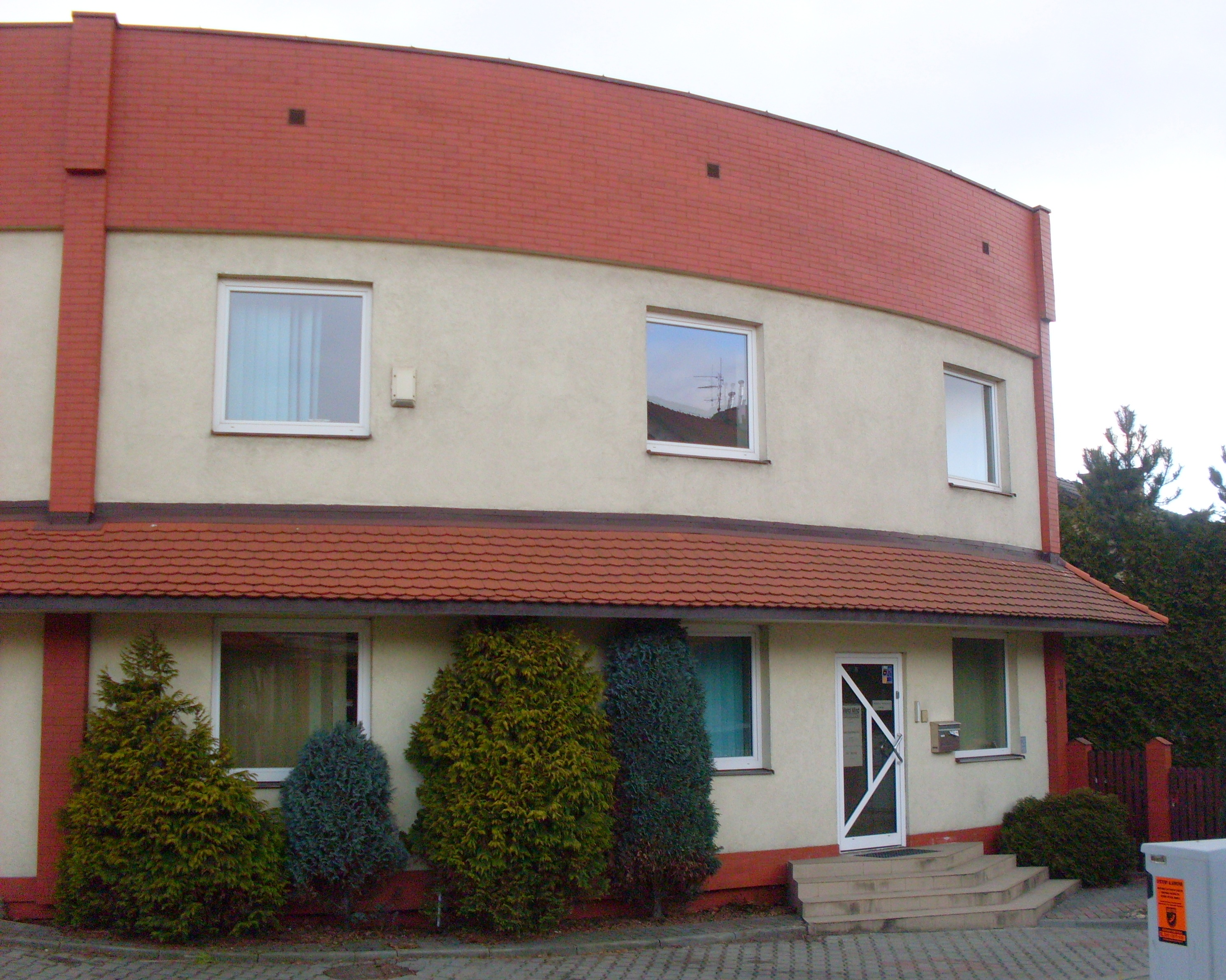
Metal Mind Productions studio (31 Czajek Street)

The district is also home to Metal Mind Productions at 31 Czajek Street. Founded in 1988, it has become a leader in Poland's independent music market and one of the country's top concert agencies. The label's catalog features albums by prominent rock and metal bands, and it publishes the Polish-language edition of Metal Hammer.

The renowned composer Wojciech Kilar, who died in 2013, lived and worked at 165 T. Kościuszko Street in the district. Over his lifetime, he composed music for more than 130 films and was associated with Katowice for 65 years. In 2018, the city purchased his home with the aim of transforming it into the Kilar's Home Music Education Centre.

Although the district lacks a dedicated cultural center, it is served by Branch No. 8 of the Municipal Public Library in Katowice, located at 53a Brynowska Street. The branch includes an adult lending library offering fiction, non-fiction, audiobooks, and magazines.

== Religion ==
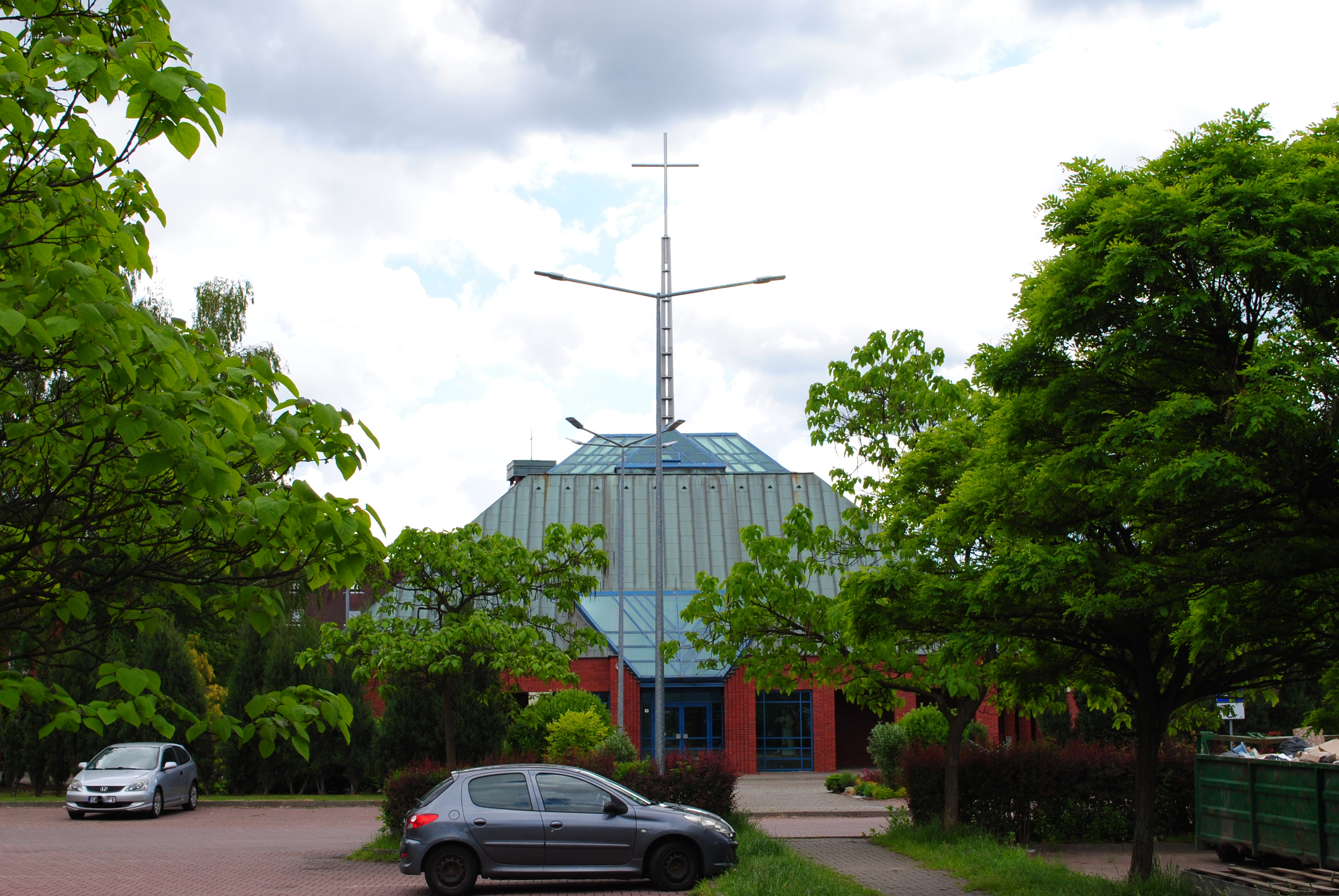
Church of Our Lady Mother of the Church, Immaculate Dawn of Freedom (20 Gawronów Street)

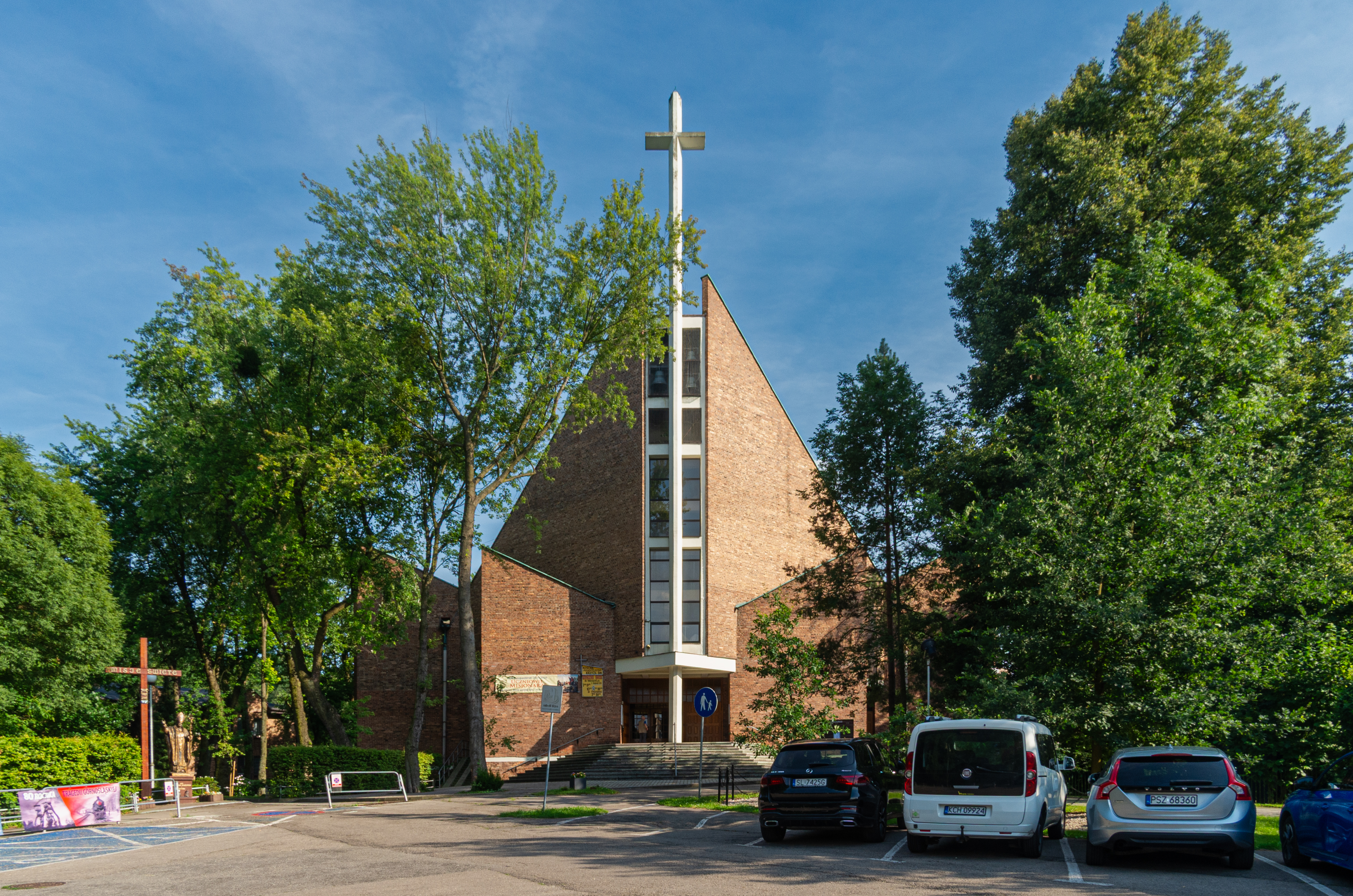
Church of the Exaltation of the Holy Cross (8 Piękna Street)

The district of Brynów-Osiedle Zgrzebnioka is home to the following Roman Catholic parishes:

- Parish of St. Michael the Archangel (20 Gawronów Street)
- Parish of the Exaltation of the Holy Cross (8 Piękna Street)

These parishes belong to the Katowice-Śródmieście deanery within the Archdiocese of Katowice. Historically, Roman Catholics in Brynów were part of the Parish of St. Stephen in Bogucice, the oldest parish in Katowice. A temporary Catholic church was built in 1860 near today's Freedom Square for the faithful from Brynów and Katowicka Hałda. In 1902, the Parish of the Apostles Peter and Paul included the residents of Brynów.

Before World War I, despite the division of the mother parish in Bogucice into smaller ones, the number of churches was insufficient for the growing population. This led to the creation of four parishes in Brynów, two of which are located in the modern district of Brynów-Osiedle Zgrzebnioka:

- Parish of St. Michael the Archangel, established on 21 February 1981
- Parish of the Exaltation of the Holy Cross, established on 1 May 1983

The wooden Church of St. Michael the Archangel was consecrated on 18 May 1958. Originally from Syrynia, it was moved in 1938 and consecrated by Father Ignacy Jeż. Initially, the church served as a branch of the Parish of the Apostles Peter and Paul, with its own rector from 1959 onward. Due to the population growth in the Polish People's Republic era, pastoral care became increasingly challenging. Following the August 1980 strikes, the parish status of St. Michael the Archangel was officially recognized on 21 February 1981. The old church was too small to serve the expanding parish. In December 1988, Bishop Damian Zimoń initiated the construction of a new church, completed in 2000 and consecrated on 25 September 2001. The new church is dedicated to Our Lady Mother of the Church, Immaculate Dawn of Freedom, making the Parish of St. Michael the Archangel the only one in Katowice with two churches.

The establishment of the Parish of the Exaltation of the Holy Cross was motivated by the tragic events of 16 December 1981, during the pacification of the Wujek Coal Mine, where nine miners were killed. A cross erected at the site of the tragedy became the symbolic origin of the new parish. Bishop Herbert Bednorz initiated the construction of a memorial church for the miners, receiving approval from the Silesian Province Governor Roman Paszkowski. The church was consecrated on 14 December 1991 by Bishop Damian Zimoń. The parish, officially established on 1 May 1983, was carved out of St. Michael the Archangel and Apostles Peter and Paul parishes.

== Sports and recreation ==
The district of Brynów-Osiedle Zgrzebnioka features several sports and recreational facilities, including the following (as of February 2023):

- Tennis courts (67 Ceglana Street) – featuring 3 indoor and 5 outdoor courts
- Squash courts – Squash Arena (67h Ceglana Street)
- Fitness club – CeglanaGYM (67c Ceglana Street)
- Sledging track (Kościuszko Park)
- Outdoor gym (Kościuszko Park)
- Skatepark – Skate in Park (67 Ceglana Street)

Brynów Swimming Pool (104 T. Kościuszko Street) features a 25-meter, six-lane sports pool, a recreational zone with a children's wading pool, water massages, geysers, a water mushroom, an air bench, two Jacuzzis, and an 80-meter slide, among other facilities. The complex also includes a gymnastics and fitness area. The facility is managed by the company Katowickie Wodociągi.

In addition to Kościuszko Park, the district benefits from the Katowice Forest Park and the Park Trail, which connects Kościuszko Park with the Valley of Three Ponds.

Historically, the first physical culture organization in Brynów was the Spiel- und Eislauverein Brynow, founded in 1913. However, the specific sections practiced within this organization remain unknown. On 12 August 1919, the Sokół movement (initially as Katowicka Hałda) was established. It offered gymnastic and athletics sections. In 1919, it had 144 members, which decreased to 70 in 1937. Notable athletes from the Brynów Sokół included Marta Majowska. The organization was removed from the registry on 7 February 1950.

Near Kościuszko Park, at the intersection of T. Kościuszko and A. Zgrzebniok streets, remnants of the former Gwardia Katowice Stadium can be found. The field was likely established in 1920 and initially served the 1. FC Kattowitz club. A match between the Polish and Swedish national football teams took place here, with Poland winning 2:1. In the Polish People's Republic, plans were made for a 30,000-seat stadium at the old Gwardia field, featuring a heated pitch, a tartan running track, and artificial lighting. The stadium was to be built through a community effort, with work expected to be completed by the end of 1982.

At T. Kościuszko Street, on land leased from the Hohenlohe company (part of the Brynów estate), a horse racing track was created by the Greater Poland Horse Racing Society. It opened on 7 August 1932, and from 1934, it co-organized events for the Silesian Horse Riding Club. The last references to the racing track in publications date back to 1945, and in official records, to 1951 (though it may have been permanently closed in 1943).

During the interwar period, the Badura Brynów Sports Club, associated with the Badura brickworks, was active. It was mentioned between 1938 and 1939, with football being one of the sports practiced there. In September 1936, a football team from the paramilitary organization Strzelec Katowice-Brynów was also noted.

== Bibliography ==
- Barciak, Antoni; Chojecka, Ewa; Fertacz, Sylwester, eds. (2012). Katowice. Środowisko, dzieje, kultura, język i społeczeństwo [Katowice. Environment, History, Culture, Language, and Society] (in Polish). Vol. 1, 2. Katowice: Muzeum Historii Katowic. ISBN 978-83-87727-24-6.
- Bartoszek, A.; Czekaj, K.; Trawkowska, D., eds. (2012). Diagnoza problemów społecznych i monitoring polityki społecznej dla aktywizacji zasobów ludzkich w Katowicach [Diagnosis of Social Problems and Monitoring of Social Policy for the Activation of Human Resources in Katowice] (in Polish). Katowice: University of Silesia in Katowice. ISBN 978-83-61061-97-7.
- Bulsa, Michał (2018). Ulice i place Katowic [Streets and Squares of Katowice] (in Polish) (3rd ed.). Katowice: Prasa i Książka. ISBN 978-83-63780-28-9.
- Bulsa, Michał; Szmatloch, B. (2019). Katowice, których nie ma [Katowice That No Longer Exist] (in Polish). Łódź: Księży Młyn. ISBN 978-83-7729-502-1.
- Chmielewska, M. (2016). Morfologiczne przekształcenia przestrzeni miejskiej Katowic [Morphological Transformations of the Urban Space of Katowice] (in Polish). Katowice: Wydawnictwo Uniwersytetu Śląskiego. ISBN 978-83-8012-837-8.
- Drobniak, A.; Polko, A.; Plac, K., eds. (2014). Diagnoza sytuacji społeczno-ekonomicznej Miasta Katowice wraz z wyznaczeniem obszarów rewitalizacji i analizą strategiczną [Diagnosis of the Socio-Economic Situation of the City of Katowice, Including the Designation of Revitalization Areas and Strategic Analysis] (PDF) (in Polish). Katowice: Miasto Katowice. ISBN 978-83-61061-97-7.
- Frużyński, A.; Grzegorek, G.; Rygus, P. (2017). Kopalnie i huty Katowic [Mines and Steelworks of Katowice] (in Polish). Katowice: Prasa i Książka. ISBN 978-83-63780-23-4.
- Grzegorek, G.; Tabaczyński, P. (2014). Parafie i kościoły Katowic [Parishes and Churches of Katowice] (in Polish). Katowice: Prasa i Książka. ISBN 978-83-63780-06-7.
- Janota, Wojciech (2010). Katowice między wojnami: miasto i jego sprawy 1922–1939 [Katowice Between the Wars: The City and Its Affairs 1922–1939] (in Polish) (1st ed.). Łódź: Księży Młyn. ISBN 978-83-7729-021-7.
- Szaraniec, Lech (1996). Osady i osiedla Katowic [Settlements and Districts of Katowice] (in Polish). Katowice: Artur. ISBN 83-905115-0-9.
- Taczewski, T. (2002). Współczesna architektura Katowic [Contemporary Architecture of Katowice] (in Polish). Katowice: GIA. ISBN 83-904135-2-3.
- Tokarska-Guzik, B.; Rostański, A.; Kupka, R. (2002). Katowice. Przyroda miasta [Katowice. The Nature of the City] (in Polish). Katowice: Kubajak. ISBN 83-87971-49-9.
