= List of mining disasters in Poland =

The following mining disasters have occurred in Poland:

== Before the 20th century ==
Year	Mine	Location	Deaths	Cause	Ref.
1565	Złoty Osioł	Złoty Stok	59 or 90	Shaft collapse	
1875	Bochnia Salt Mine	Bochnia	12	Fire caused by human error	
1880	Ludmiła	Sosnowiec	200	Flood	
1896	Kleofas	Katowice	104	Poisonous gases	

== 20th century ==
=== 1900–1949 ===
Date	Mine	Location	Deaths	Cause	Ref.
7 December 1917	Emma	Radlin	17	Fire	
10 January 1923	Donnersmarckhütte	Mikulczyce	45	See: Mining disaster at Donnersmarckhütte mine Fire	
31 January 1923	Heinitz	Bytom	145	Coal dust explosion	
20 September 1923	Reden	Dąbrowa Górnicza	38	Fire	
9 July 1930	Wenceslaus	Ludwikowice Kłodzkie	151	Carbon dioxide poisoning	
10 May 1941	Nowa Ruda	Nowa Ruda	187	Carbon dioxide poisoning	

=== 1950–1969 ===
Date	Mine	Location	Deaths	Cause	Ref.
21 March 1954	Barbara-Wyzwolenie	Chorzów	81–102		
28 August 1958	Makoszowy	Zabrze	72		

=== 1970–1999 ===
Date	Mine	Location	Deaths	Cause	Ref.
23 March 1971	Rokitnica	Zabrze	10		
28 June 1974	Silesia	Czechowice-Dziedzice	34		
4–5 August 1977	Tadeusz Kościuszko salt mine	Wapno	0	Groundwater permeated the mine causing a sinkhole, which destroyed 40 houses in the town, part of the railway station, and some train tracks.	
5 July 1978	Staszic	Katowice	4		
10 October 1979	Dymitrow	Bytom	34		
30 October 1979	Silesia	Czechowice-Dziedzice	22		
29–30 November 1982	Dymitrow	Bytom	19		
22 December 1985	Wałbrzych	Wałbrzych	18		
4 February 1987	Mysłowice	Mysłowice	18		
10 January 1990	Halemba	Ruda Śląska	19		
1990	Śląsk	Ruda Śląska	4		
7 March 1991	Halemba	Ruda Śląska	5		
17 September 1993	Miechowice	Bytom	6		
11 September 1995	Nowy Wirek	Ruda Śląska	5		
12 December 1996	Bielszowice	Zabrze	5		
24 February 1998	Niwka-Modrzejów	Sosnowiec	6		

== 21st century ==
Date	Mine	Location	Deaths	Cause	Ref.
2000		Piekary Śląskie	3		
6 February 2002	Jas-Mos Coal Mine	Jastrzębie-Zdrój	10	Coal dust explosion 700 metres underground	
2005	Pokój	Ruda Śląska	2		
2005	Zofiówka Coal Mine	Jastrzębie-Zdrój	3		
27 July 2006	Pokój	Ruda Śląska	4		
21 November 2006	Halemba Coal Mine	Ruda Śląska	23	See: 2006 Halemba Coal Mine disaster Methane explosion	
4 June 2008	Borynia Coal Mine	Jastrzębie-Zdrój	6	Methane explosion	
18 September 2009	Wujek-Śląsk	Ruda Śląska	20	See: 2009 Wujek-Śląsk mine blast Methane explosion	
5 May 2018	Zofiówka Coal Mine	Jastrzębie-Zdrój	5	Earthquake	
5 March 2021	Mysłowice-Wesoła Coal Mine	Mysłowice	2	Underground rockfall	
20–21 April 2022	Pniówek Coal Mine	Pniówek	9	Methane explosion	
23 April 2022	Zofiówka Coal Mine	Jastrzębie-Zdrój	10	Mine collapse	
