= Brynów =

Coordinates: 50°14′29.41″N 18°59′43.01″E

- Katowice District
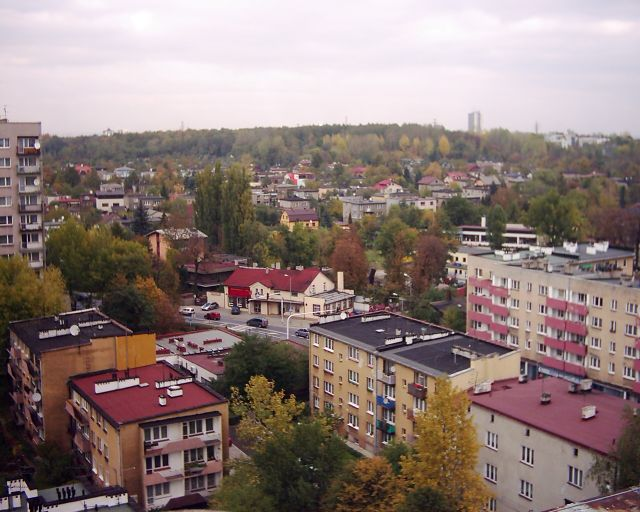
- View of Brynów - Brynowska Street and Kościuszko Park

- Districts of Katowice. 11 is Brynów-Osiedle Zgrzebnioka and 12 is Brynów-Załęska Hałda
- Country: Poland
- Voivodeship: Silesian
- County/City: Katowice

Area
  - Total: 10.62 km^{2} (4.10 sq mi)
- Time zone: UTC+1 (CET)
  - Summer (DST): UTC+2 (CEST)

Brynów is a district in Katowice, Poland. It is located in the central part of Katowice, south-west of the immediate center, and is divided into two subdistricts:

- Brynów - Osiedle Zgrzebnioka is the eastern subdistrict with 7,200 inhabitants (in 2002)
- Brynów - Załęska Hałda is the western subdistrict with 16,800 inhabitants (in 2002)

Brynów (German: Brynow) borders the following districts of Katowice: Załęże, Osiedle Paderewskiego - Muchowiec, Śródmieście, Ligota - Panewniki, Piotrowice - Ochojec.

Among the landmarks of Brynów are:

- Kopalnia Wujek, a coal mine known as the place the government of People's Republic of Poland brutally suppressed workers demonstration in December, 1981.
- Kościuszko Park, the largest park in the city
- Church of St. Michael Archangel, located in Kościuszko park, is the oldest building in Katowice (from 1510)
- Parachute tower, the only one in Poland, place of a battle during the Invasion of Poland

History of Brynów, as a village, goes back to the 15th century.

Brynów has its own train station. There are several major roads and a tram line.

There are several schools, five churches and three supermarkets in Brynów. A small civilian airport is nearby.
