= Załęska Hałda-Brynów =

District of Katowice

- Katowice District
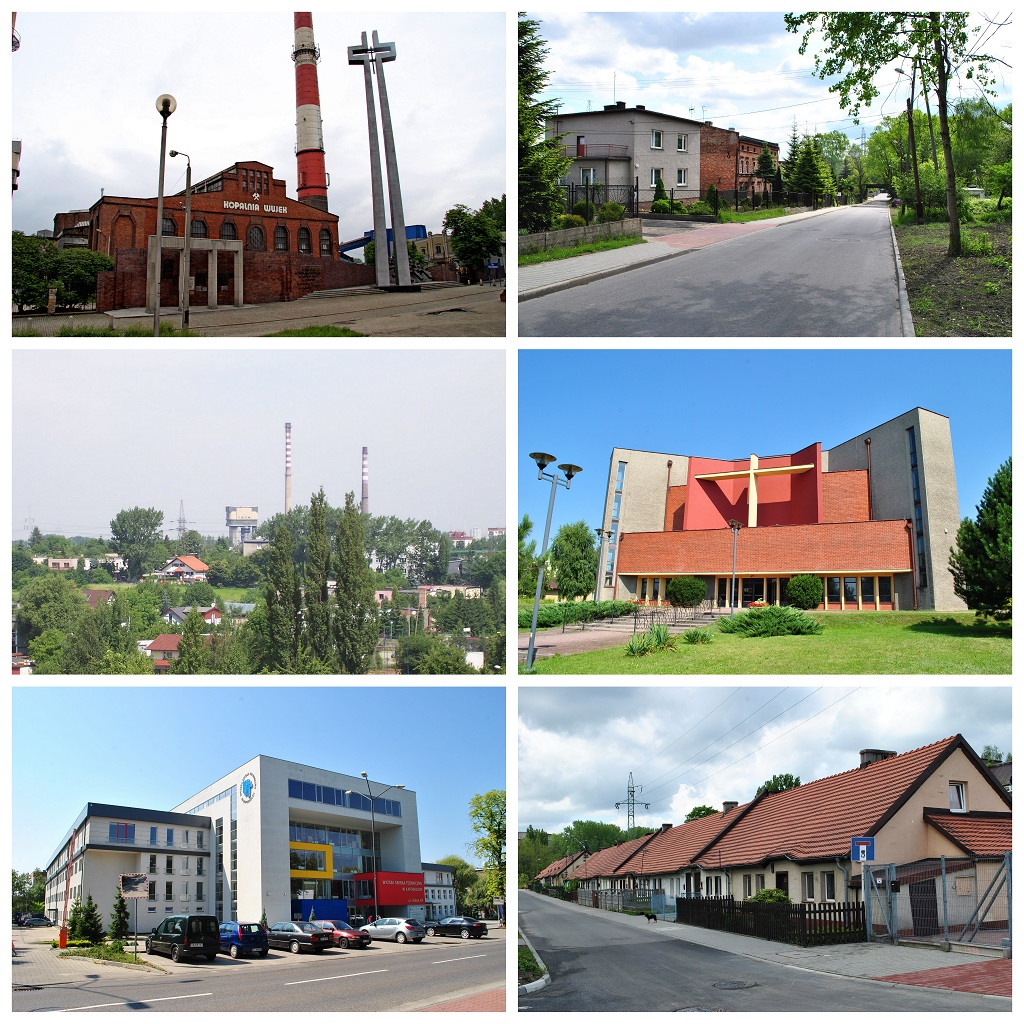
- Wujek Coal Mine, Załęska Hałda Street, view of Brynów, Church of the Holy Family and St. Maximilian Kolbe, Academy of Silesia, Wujek Coal Mine workers' colony

- Coat of arms

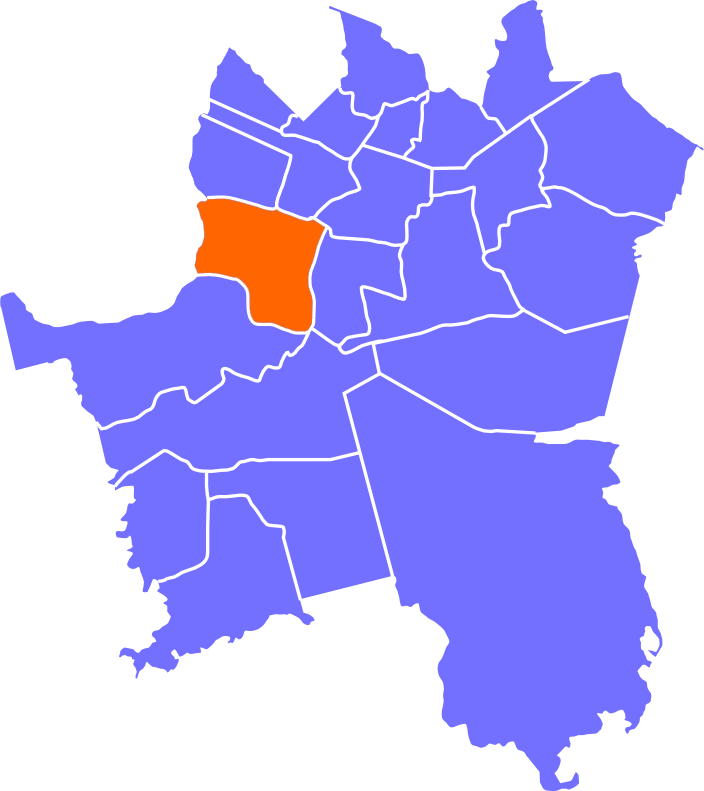
- Location of Załęska Hałda-Brynów within Katowice
- Coordinates: 50°14′48.4800″N 18°59′07.8000″E
- Country: Poland
- Voivodeship: Silesian
- County/City: Katowice
- Established: 29 September 1997

Area
  - Total: 6.54 km^{2} (2.53 sq mi)
- Elevation: 280–330 m (920–1,080 ft)

Population (2007)
  - Total: 2,630
  - Density: 402/km^{2} (1,040/sq mi)
- Time zone: UTC+1 (CET)
  - Summer (DST): UTC+2 (CEST)
- Area code: (+48) 032

Załęska Hałda-Brynów (full name: Załęska Hałda-Brynów część zachodnia) is a district of Katowice, located in the western part of the city. It lies between the A4 motorway and the Kłodnica river, within the area of four historical parts of Katowice: Załęska Hałda, Brynów, Stara Ligota, and Katowicka Hałda.

Until the beginning of the 19th century, the present-day district was used for agriculture. From the 19th century, Załęska Hałda, Brynów, and Stara Ligota underwent significant industrial development, mainly in mining. Today, the district is both industrial and residential. Its main industrial facility is the Wujek Coal Mine (part of the Staszic-Wujek Coal Mine), which has operated since 1899. The district covers 6.54 km^{2} and had a population of 17,207 at the end of 2007.

== Geography ==
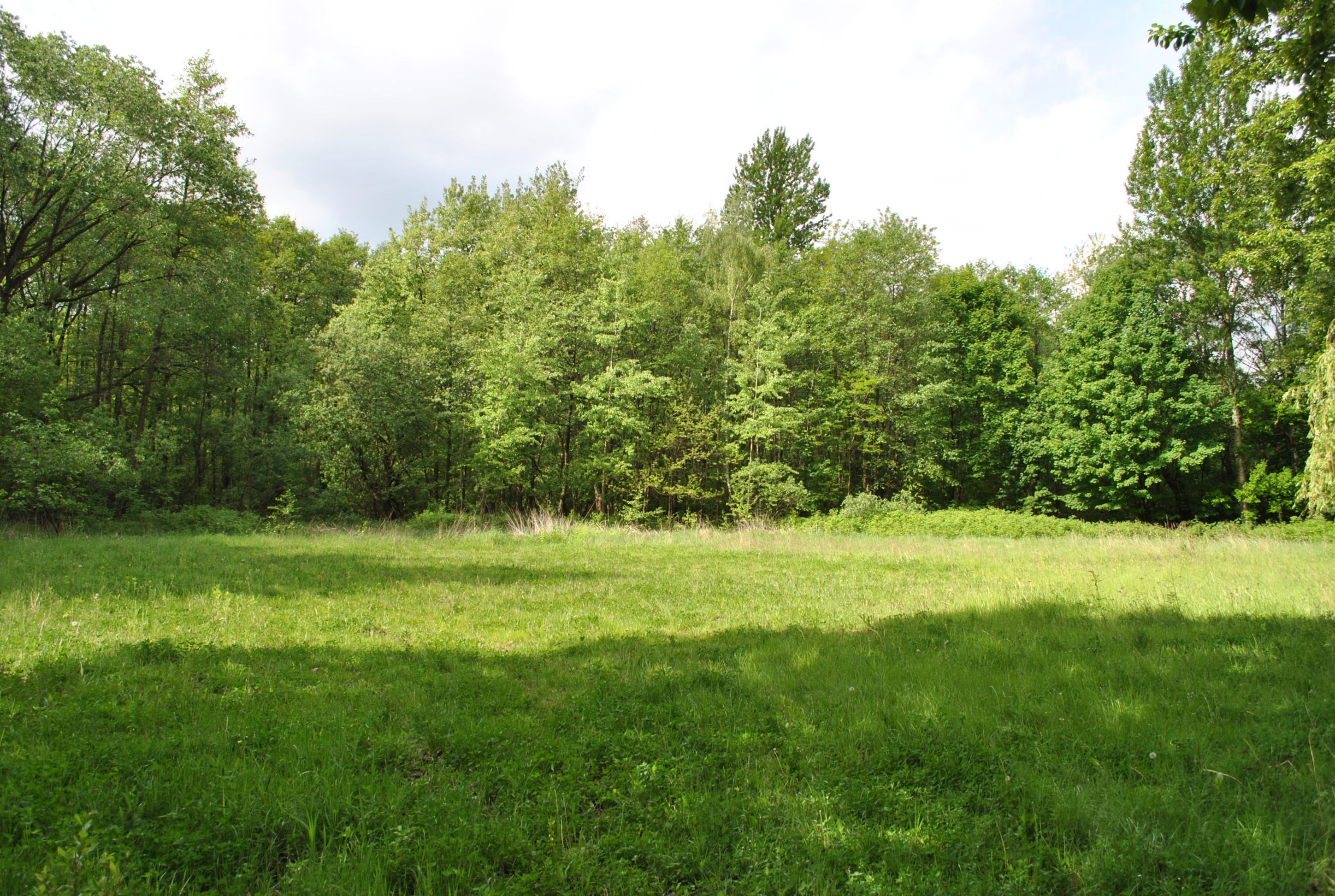
Fragment of Załęski Forest

=== Location ===
Załęska Hałda-Brynów is one of the administrative districts of Katowice (No. 2), one of the western districts of the city. It borders Osiedle Witosa and Załęże to the north, Brynów-Osiedle Zgrzebnioka to the east, Ligota-Panewniki to the south, and the city of Chorzów to the west. It comprises four historical areas of Katowice:

- northwestern – Załęska Hałda (southern part of the settlement);
- eastern – Brynów (western part of the former gmina);
- northeastern – Katowicka Hałda (western part of the former workers' colony in historic Gmina Brynów);
- southwestern – Stara Ligota (eastern, older part of Ligota).

According to Jerzy Kondracki's physiogeographic division, Załęska Hałda-Brynów is located in the Katowice Upland mesoregion, which forms the southern part of the Silesian Upland within the Silesian-Kraków Upland subprovince.

The district's boundaries are:

- to the north – along Kochłowicka Street (A4 motorway);
- to the east – along Mikołowska, Brynowska, and Tadeusz Kościuszko streets;
- to the south – along the Kłodnica river and Dąbrowa Górnicza Towarowa–Panewnik railway;
- to the west – along the city border with Chorzów.

=== Geology ===
Załęska Hałda-Brynów is located in the Upper Silesian Sinkhole, filled with Upper Carboniferous formations, especially coal-bearing sediments within the Paleozoic structures of the Central Polish Uplands. The bedrock consists of Precambrian crystalline rocks, overlain by diabases and then by 100 meter thick terrestrial sediments, composed mainly of sandstones and conglomerates. Above them is a 200-meter thick Terreneuvian layer (fine-grained sandstone and mudstone), covered with Early Devonian sandstones. In the northern areas, these layers, together with Carboniferous sediments, are covered by Quaternary formations, mainly of glacial origin, formed during the Mindel glaciation. They consist of till, its weathering products, and glacial sands and gravels.

The soils in Załęska Hałda-Brynów have been subjected to strong anthropogenic pressure due to settlement and industrial activity, resulting in a high proportion of initial soils. The soils in the district are mainly anthrosols, formed from tills and sandstones. They are classified as class IV in the Polish soil quality system, and show contamination with heavy metals (lead, cadmium, and zinc) caused by emissions, especially industrial and from coal combustion.

=== Topography ===
According to morphological units, Załęska Hałda-Brynów is located mostly in the Kochłowice Hills, characterized by flattened hills and deep, locally incised valleys. The district has a large terrain variation, with elevations sloping downward to the south, to the Kłodnica river valley. The highest point, Cisowa Góra, is located in the forested western part of Załęska Hałda. Its height reaches 338.8 m above sea level, while the Kłodnica riverbed lies at an altitude of about 270 m above sea level. Processes such as levelling, sedimentation, and the settling of various materials largely influence the changing terrain of Załęska Hałda-Brynów.

=== Climate and hydrography ===
The climate of the district differs slightly from the conditions in Katowice as a whole. The average annual temperature is 8.1 °C, and the average annual precipitation is 710 mm. The average snow cover duration is 60–70 days, and the growing season lasts usually 200–220 days. The area is characterized by weak winds, with speeds not exceeding 2 m/s, blowing from the west.

A first-order drainage divide crosses Załęska Hałda-Brynów, so that the northern part of the district is located in the Vistula basin, in the catchment area of the Rawa, while the southern part lies in the Oder river basin, in the catchment area of the Kłodnica.

=== Nature and environmental protection ===
Załęska Hałda-Brynów has a significant proportion of green areas, mainly in its western part, which are remnants of the Załęski Forest. Oaks dominate there, with birch and pine complexes present at higher elevations. The forests are located within the Katowice Forest Directorate. Part of these complexes is legally protected as the Uroczysko Buczyna nature and landscape complex.

The following squares and landscaped green areas are located in Załęska Hałda-Brynów:

- Kazimierz Gołba Square – located in Brynów, near the intersection of Wincenty Pol and Dziewięciu z Wujka streets;
- Solidarity Square – located in Brynów, along Wincenty Pol Street. It has a monument to the miners killed at the Wujek Coal Mine;
- Bernard Polok Square – located in Załęska Hałda, at the intersection of Dobrego Urobku and Brygadzistów streets;
- Secret Teaching Organization Square – located in Brynów, at the intersection of Brynowska and Tadeusz Kościuszko streets.

The allotment gardens in Załęska Hałda-Brynów are managed by the Silesian Regional Board of the Katowice Branch of the Polish Allotment Gardeners' Association. In 2007, the following gardens were located there:

Name	Street	Area (ha)	No. of plots (2007)
Baildon, Kochłowicki area	Załęska Hałda	0.36	10
Górnik I	Kombajnistów	5.15	120
Górnik II	Strzałowa	3.16	90
Kępa	Ligocka	3.85	100
Relaks	Ligocka	0.92	25
Rezeda I	Przodowników	3.04	90
Tęcza	Szadoka	2.14	60
Zawadzki colony I (main)	Załęska Hałda	5.10	90
Zawadzki colony Załęski Las	Upadowa	0.74	20

== History ==
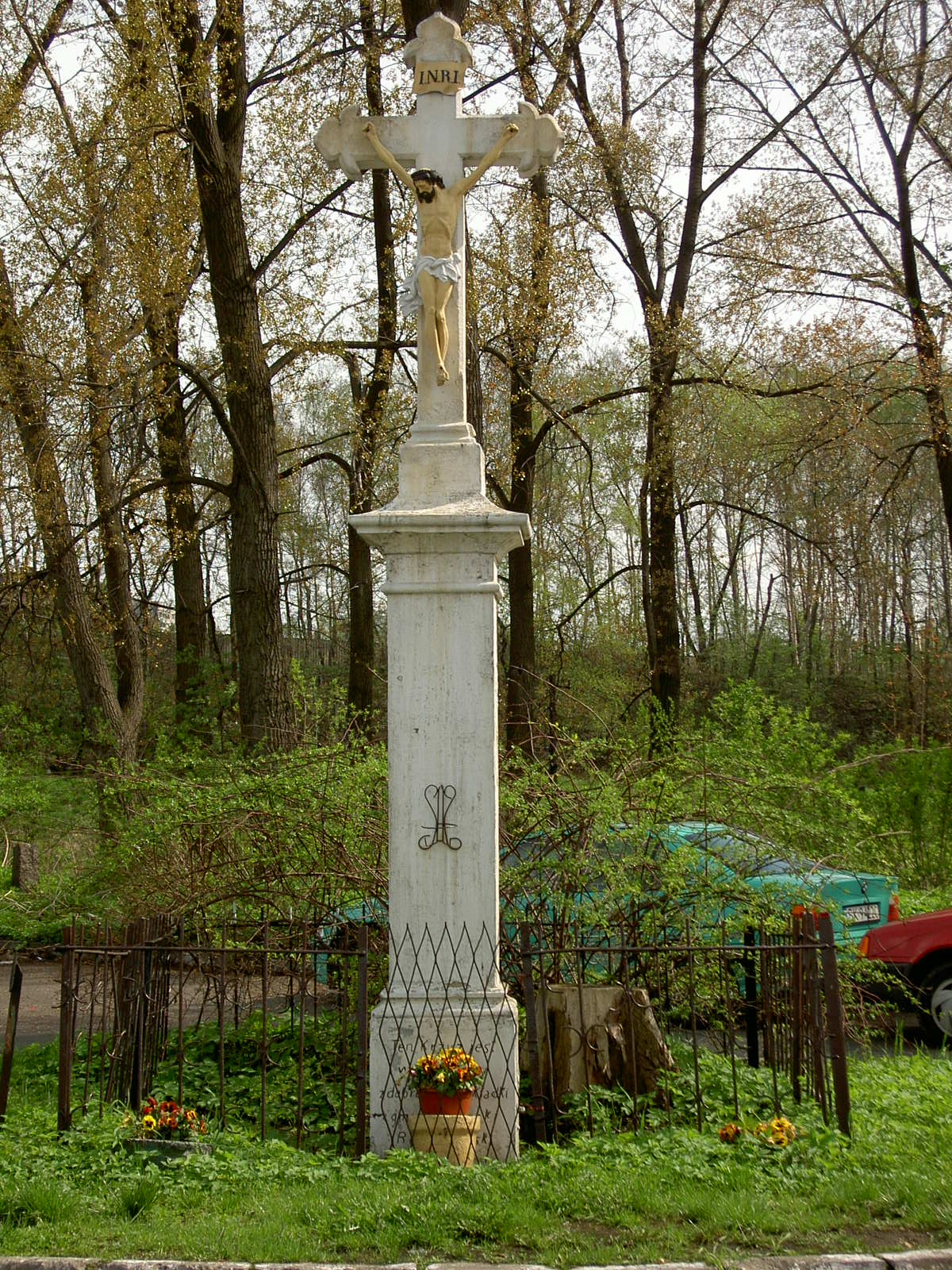
Roadside cross in Załęska Hałda

=== Załęska Hałda ===
The first mentions of Załęska Hałda date back to around 1710–1720, when the Bogucice parish records mentioned the settlement of "Załęsko Hołda". At that time, an agricultural settlement, a colony of Załęże, was established in the partially cleared Załęski Forest. It retained its agricultural character until the second half of the 19th century, when workers from the Viktor and Johanna zinc smelters, as well as from the later Kleofas and Wujek coal mines, began to settle there. The center of the settlement was then near the present-day motorway junction with Feliks Bocheński Street.

On the night of 22–23 August 1920, during the Second Silesian Uprising, the Polish Military Organization of Upper Silesia seized control of Załęska Hałda. In the Third Silesian Uprising of 1921, insurgents captured the area, and a year later, the settlement was incorporated into Poland. In 1924, Załęska Hałda, along with Gmina Załęże, became part of Katowice. After World War II, on 11 September 1945, Bishop Stanisław Adamski dedicated the Church of Saints Cyril and Methodius. In the 1990s, part of Załęska Hałda (located on the south side of the current A4 motorway) was incorporated into Załęska Hałda-Brynów.

=== Brynów and Katowicka Hałda ===
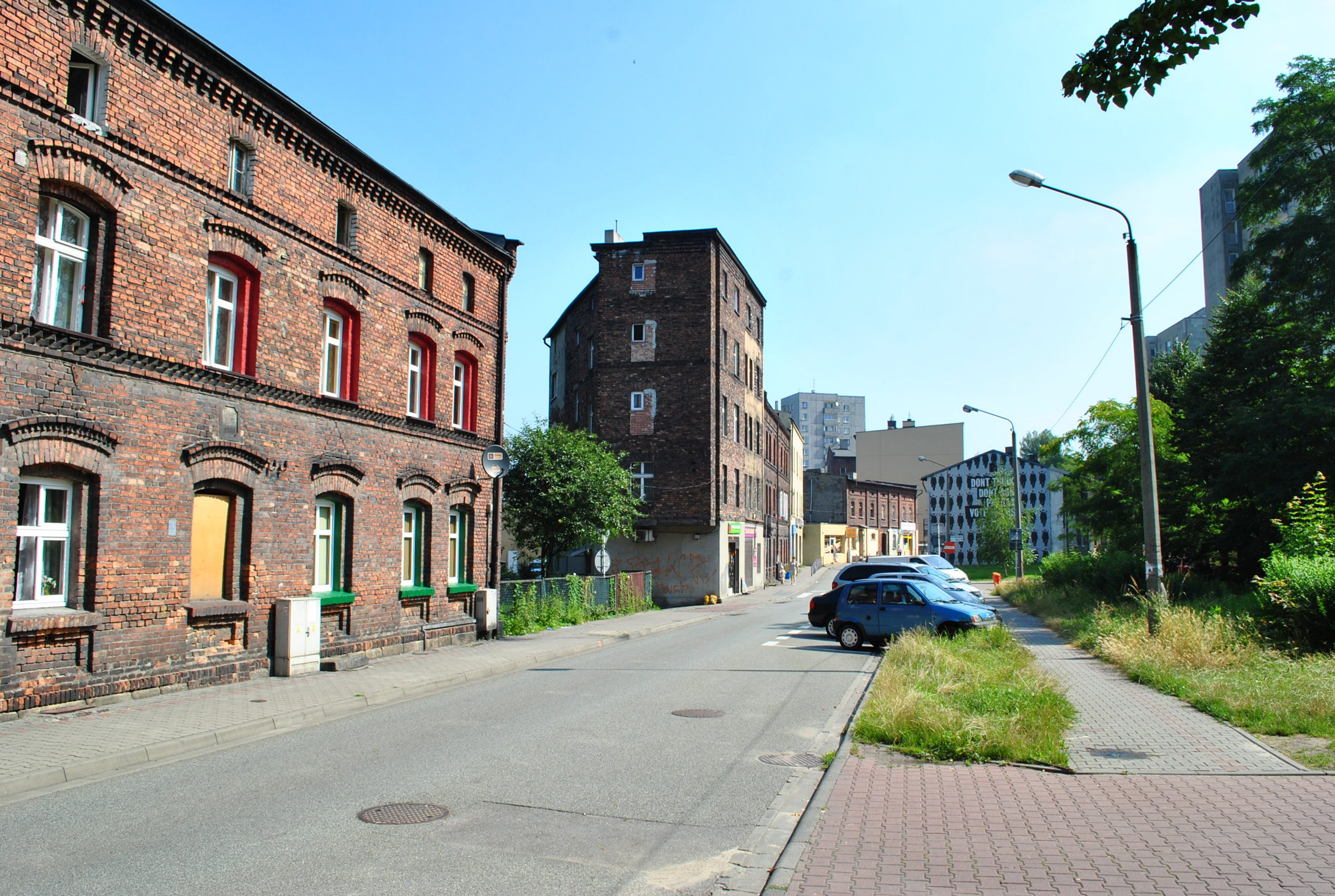
W. Pol Street in Katowicka Hałda

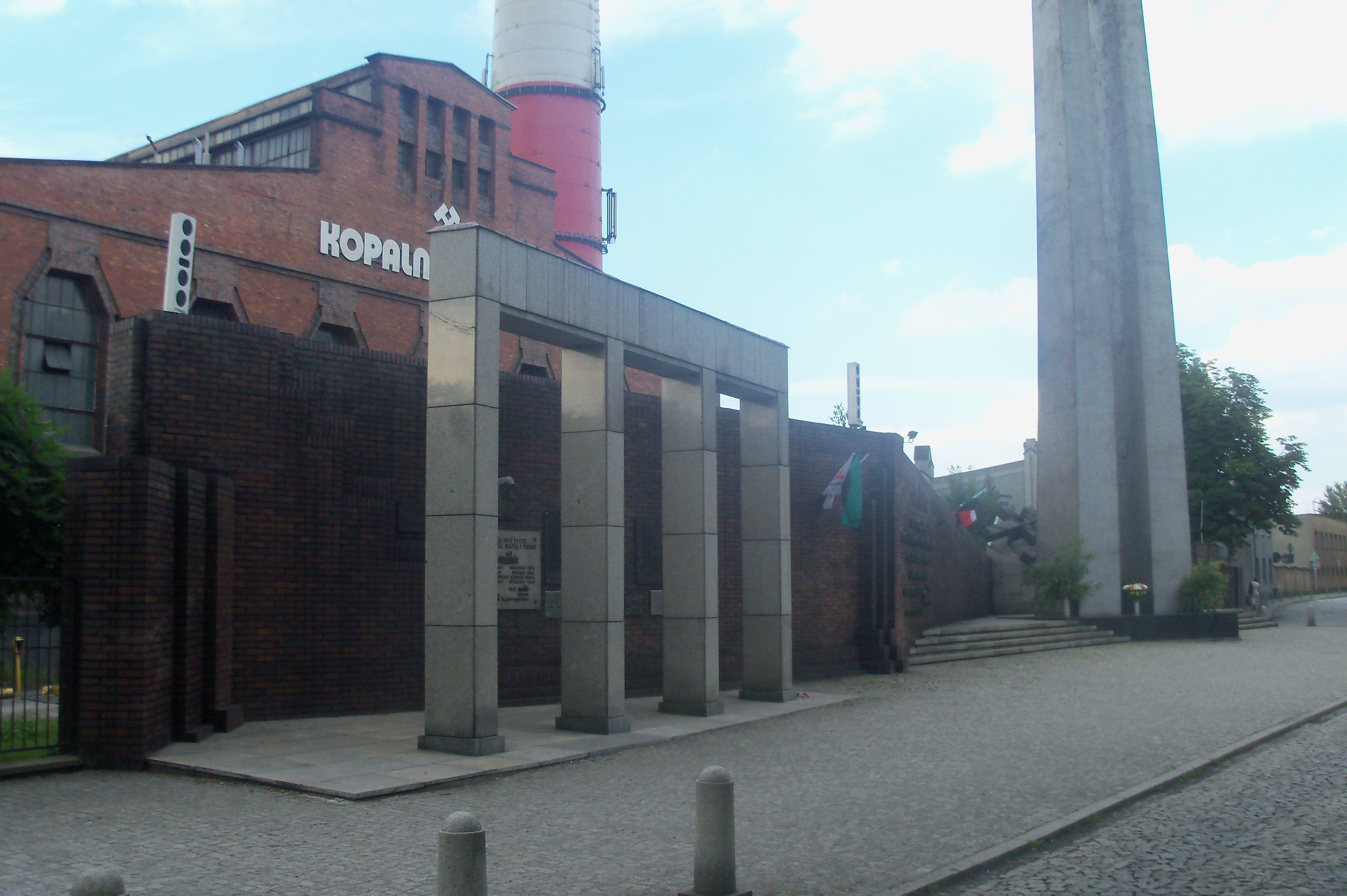
Monument to the miners of the Wujek Coal Mine who died on 16 December 1981

The village of Brynów was first mentioned in a document from 1474 as part of the Duchy of Pless. In 1536, it became the property of the Salomon family, which from then on shared the fortunes of Kuźnica Bogucka, and later Katowice. At the turn of the 17th and 18th centuries, the Brynów folwark was established. Until 1865, it was part of Gmina Katowice, and then it formed an independent municipality together with its colony, Katowicka Hałda. From the beginning of the 19th century, open-pit mines and brickyards were established there. In 1899, the Oheim Coal Mine was opened (renamed Wujek in 1922). In 1921, Silesian insurgents from Brynów captured German barracks in Katowice and fought at Góra Świętej Anny. In 1924, the settlement was incorporated into Katowice. During the Nazi occupation, the Germans established a labor camp at the Wujek Coal Mine.

On 14 December 1981, in connection with the introduction of martial law, a sit-in strike began at the Wujek Coal Mine. Two days later, on 16 December 1981, the militia and army attacked the strikers in a bloody pacification of the mine, resulting in the deaths of nine miners.

=== Stara Ligota ===
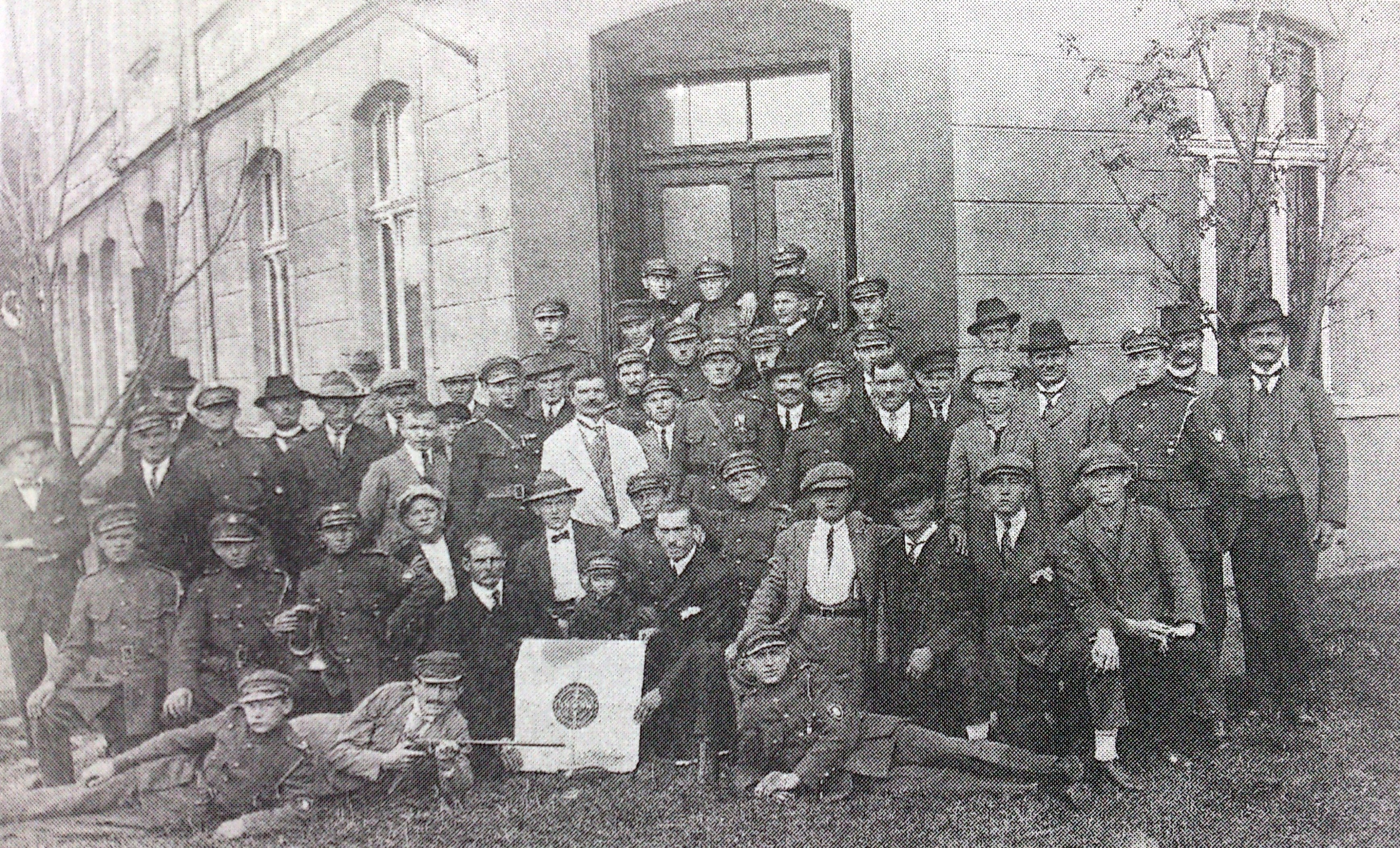
Silesian insurgents in front of Pilch's inn in Stara Ligota

The present-day Stara Ligota was established in the area of Hetmańska, Ligocka, Załęska, and Rolna streets. It was first mentioned as "Lhota" in 1360 in the document of sale of the Pless estates issued by Casimir II on 21 February 1517, describing it as abandoned and empty. The lands of Stara Ligota were later owned by the dukes of Pless. At the beginning of the 18th century, the village obtained the rights of an independent gmina. The increase in the population of Ligota was related to the industrial development of the region, which began in the 19th century and was based mainly on ore processing and coal mining. In 1852, a railway was built from Katowice to Murcki through Ligota, and the Katowice Ligota railway station was opened, thanks to which the settlement continued to develop towards Panewniki (now part of Ligota-Panewniki).

On 17 August 1919, during the First Silesian Uprising, insurgents from a unit formed in Ochojec under the command of Jan Żychoń captured the railway station, disrupting the connection between Katowice and Żory, and seized the German Grenzschutz post at Kaczmarczykowa's Inn. During the 1921 plebiscite, 70.54% of the citizens of the rural Gmina Ligota voted for it to belong to Poland. During the Third Silesian Uprising, on the night of 3 May 1921, Silesian insurgent forces under Walenty Fojkis gathered in Ligota before attacking and capturing Katowice.

Ligota officially came under Polish administration on 20 June 1922, and two years later, together with Brynów, it was incorporated into Katowice as part of a new fourth district. During the German occupation between 1939 and 1945, a camp operated in Ligota for Poles expelled from Upper Silesia to the General Government. German forces withdrew from Ligota on the morning of 26 January 1945, destroying, among other things, three bridges over the Kłodnica river.

== Demographics ==
In 1988, the present-day Załęska Hałda-Brynów had a total population of 20,389, with the age structure dominated by residents aged 15–29 and 30–44. In later years, the population declined – in 1997, the district had approximately 17,800 inhabitants, while the population density was 2.74 thousand people per km^{2}. In 2007, it had a population of 17,207, and the age structure was dominated by people aged 45–59 and over 60.

== Politics and administration ==
Originally, Załęska Hałda-Brynów belonged to the historic gminas of Brynów (Brynów and Katowicka Hałda), Ligota (Stara Ligota), and Załęże (Załęska Hałda). On 1 January 1992, Katowice established 22 auxiliary local government units. At that time, Załęska Hałda-Brynów was part of Ligota-Panewniki. On the basis of Resolution No. XLVI/449/97 of the Katowice City Council dated 29 September 1997, the district was separated from Ligota-Panewniki to become a statutory district (auxiliary unit No. 2) in the western district group. The resolution also defined its exact boundaries.

For elections to the Katowice City Council, the district belongs to electoral constituency no. 4, which includes Osiedle Tysiąclecia, Dąb, Załęże, Osiedle Witosa, and Załęska Hałda-Brynów. From 2010 to 2014, this constituency had 6 representatives in the city council.

== Economy ==
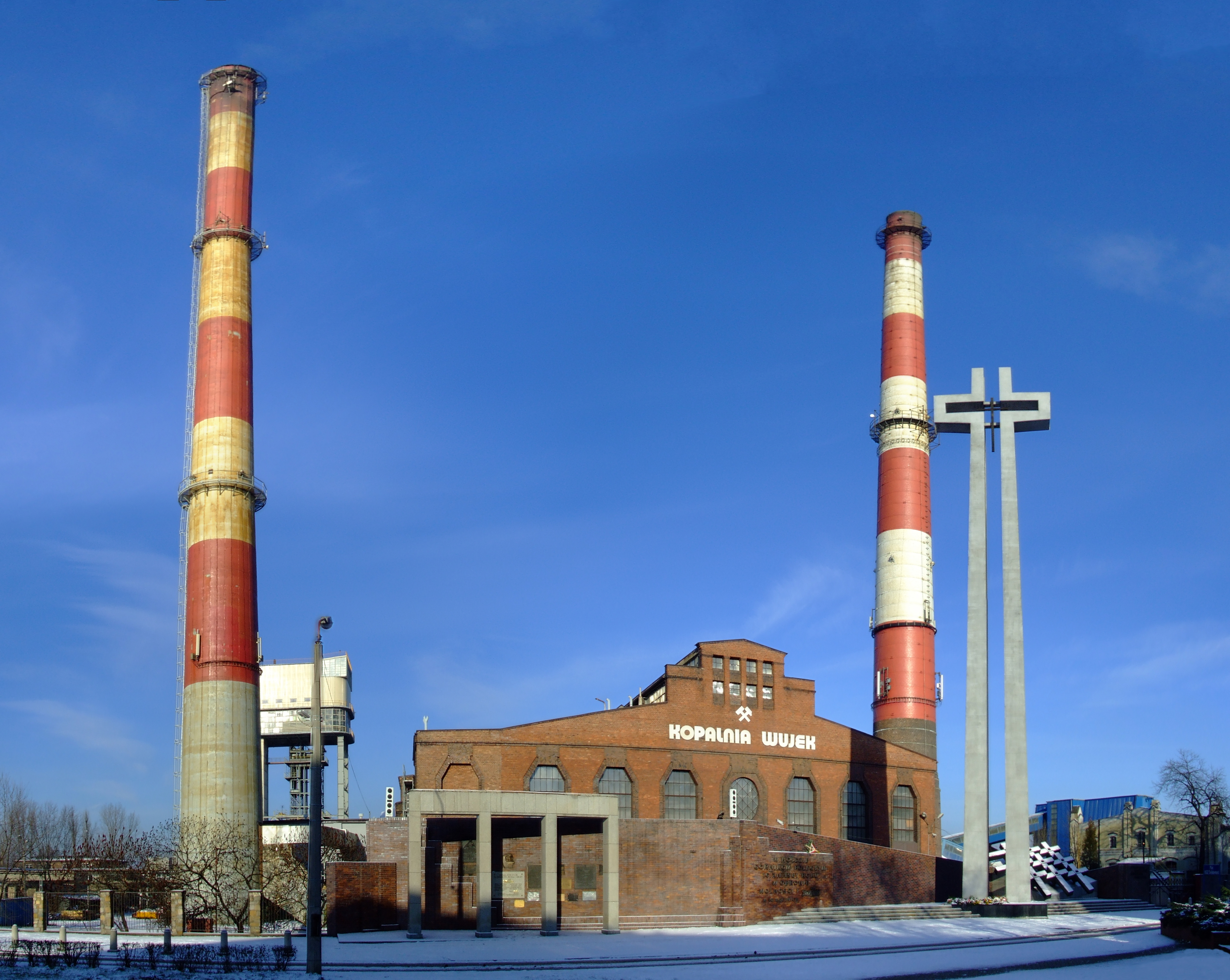
Wujek Coal Mine

Originally, Załęska Hałda-Brynów was mainly agricultural. Industrial activity began in 1788, when Wilhelm Jaenkner applied for a mining concession for the Charlotte mining area in the Załęski Forest. Later, between 1801 and 1806 and between 1836 and 1880, the Beata Coal Mine operated there. Following the discovery of rich coal deposits in Brynów, six mines were merged into Oheim mine (now Wujek) on 4 March 1899. In the same year, drilling of the first shaft began, and the first tons of coal were extracted on 7 November 1900.

The Wujek Coal Mine (branch of the Staszic-Wujek Coal Mine) is the main industrial plant in the district. It went through the period of political transformation after 1989 without any major disruptions,and in 1992, it made a profit and became one of the best mines of its kind in Poland. In 1993, Wujek became part of the Katowice Coal Holding Company. In 1999, the mine extracted approximately 2 million tons of coal and employed around 4,000 people.

In 2011, construction began on Poland's first passive office building, Euro-Centrum, completed in January 2014. It is the headquarters of the Euro-Centrum Science and Technology Park.

In Załęska Hałda-Brynów, there are three local service centers, whose degree of development varies depending on the size of the area served and their origins. They are linear in nature:

- Rolna Street (section from F. Joliot-Curie Street to Hetmańska Street; 7,718 residents within a 500 m radius) – services: retail, kindergarten, primary school, middle school, library, church, and public transport stops;
- Brynowska Street (section from Dworska Street to T. Kościuszko Street; 3,195 residents within a 500 m radius) – services: retail, kindergarten, primary school, middle school, library, and public transport stops;
- Mikołowska, Wincenty Pol, and Ligocka streets (sections within Katowicka Hałda; 5,104 residents within a 500 m radius) – services: retail, kindergarten, primary school, middle school, community center, religious buildings, recreational facilities, and public transport stops.

== Technical infrastructure ==
The main sources of water for the residents of Załęska Hałda-Brynów are surface intakes on the Vistula river (Goczałkowice Lake) and the Soła river (Czanieckie Lake). Water from the Water Treatment Plant is distributed through main and distribution water pipes. DN 1,400 mm western main transmission pipeline runs along the northern border of the district, connecting the "Murcki" equalizing reservoir with the "Bytków" reservoir. Water supply is provided by Upper Silesian Waterworks and Katowice Waterworks, with the latter also managing the sewage system. The northern part of Załęska Hałda-Brynów is located in the catchment area of the Centrum-Gigablok sewage treatment plant, which is connected to the combined sewer system, while sewage from the southern part of the district is discharged to the Panewniki plant.

Załęska Hałda-Brynów is supplied with electricity via a 110 kV high-voltage network connecting it to nearby power plants. There are two substations in the district with a transformation level of 110/6 kV: "Brynów" (on Brynowska Street) and the substation at the Wujek Coal Mine (on Wincenty Pol Street). The average electricity consumption per household in Katowice in 2006 was 865.7 kWh.

== Transport ==
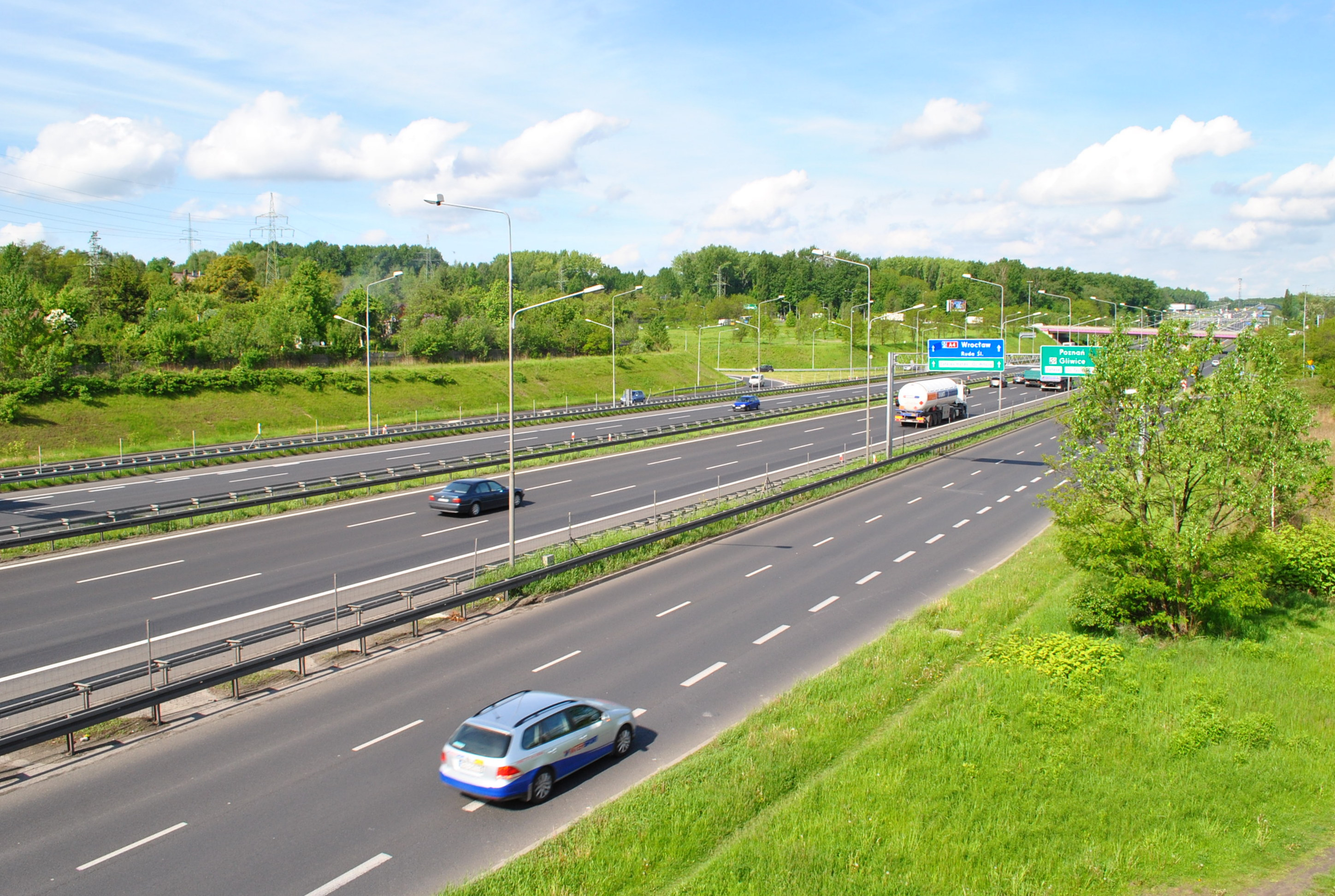
A4 motorway at the disused railway viaduct

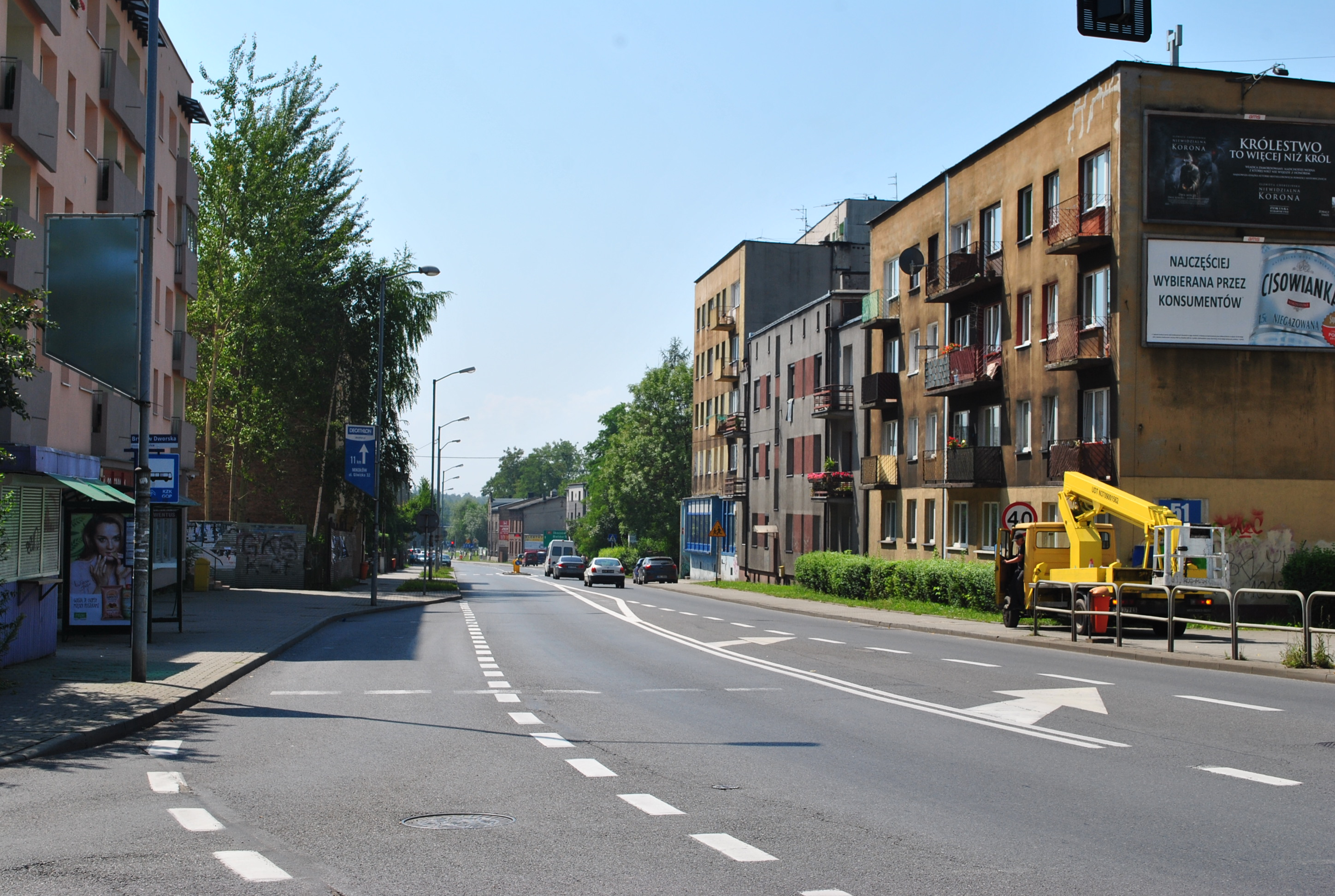
Brynowska Street in Brynów (view looking south)

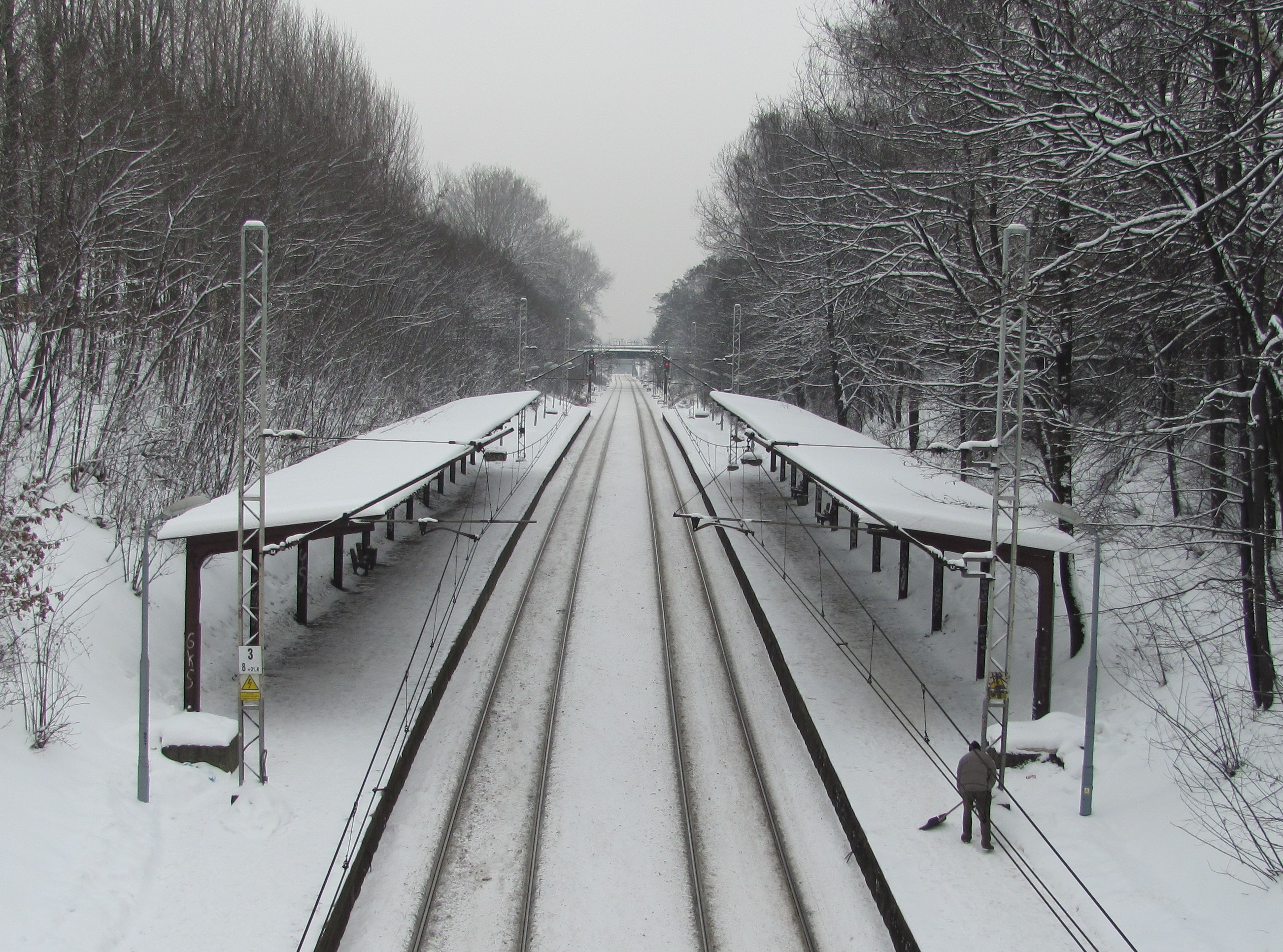
Katowice Brynów railway station

=== Road transport ===
The main transport arteries in Załęska Hałda-Brynów are the streets running along its border: Kochłowicka (A4 motorway, located in the northern part), Mikołowska, and Brynowska (streets surrounding the district from the east). The most important streets also include Ligocka, Rolna, and Załęska.

The A4 motorway is the main west–east transport link in Katowice. There are two junctions in the district, connecting the motorway with Feliks Bocheński and Mikołowska streets. They are the main expressways in Katowice, linking the primary roads (the A4 motorway and national road 81). Ligocka Street is the main street connecting Mikołowska Street with Ligota.

In terms of intra-city connections, Załęska Hałda-Brynów has very good connections with Śródmieście (along Ligocka and Mikołowska streets, and along Rolna and T. Kościuszko streets), as well as with the districts of Ligota-Panewniki, Piotrowice-Ochojec, Murcki, Giszowiec, and Osiedle Witosa.

=== Rail transport ===
Rail transport in Załęska Hałda-Brynów dates back to 1 December 1852, when the Upper Silesian Railway opened a railway connecting Katowice with Murcki via Ligota (part of Katowice–Zwardoń railway). In the 1950s, the Southern Sand Main Railway was built, running north through the Wujek Coal Mine and Załęska Hałda to the Kleofas mine. It was dismantled in 2009. The active Dąbrowa Górnicza Towarowa–Panewnik railway runs along the Southern Sand Main Railway.

== Architecture and urban form ==
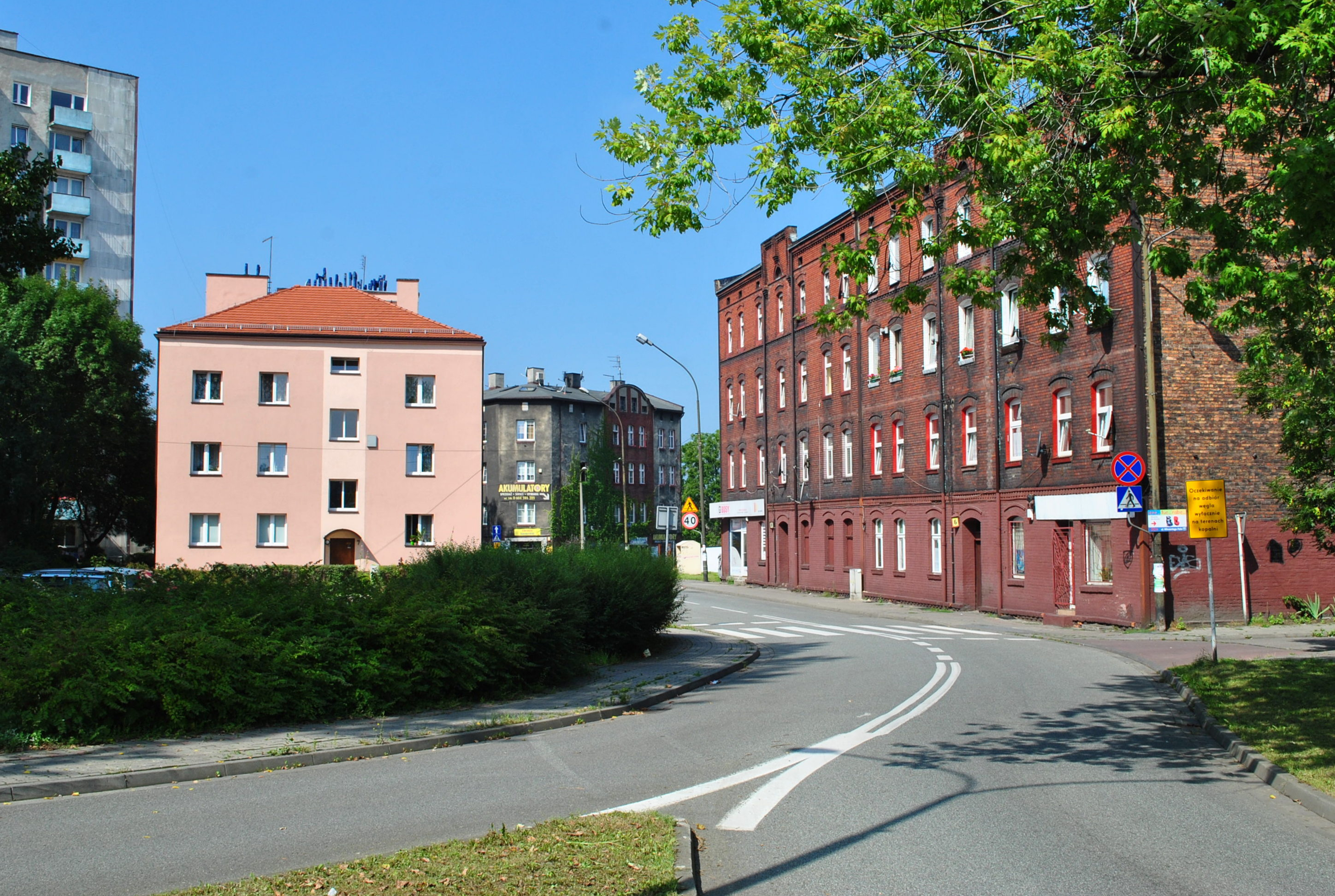
Tenements of the Wujek Coal Mine on W. Pol Street

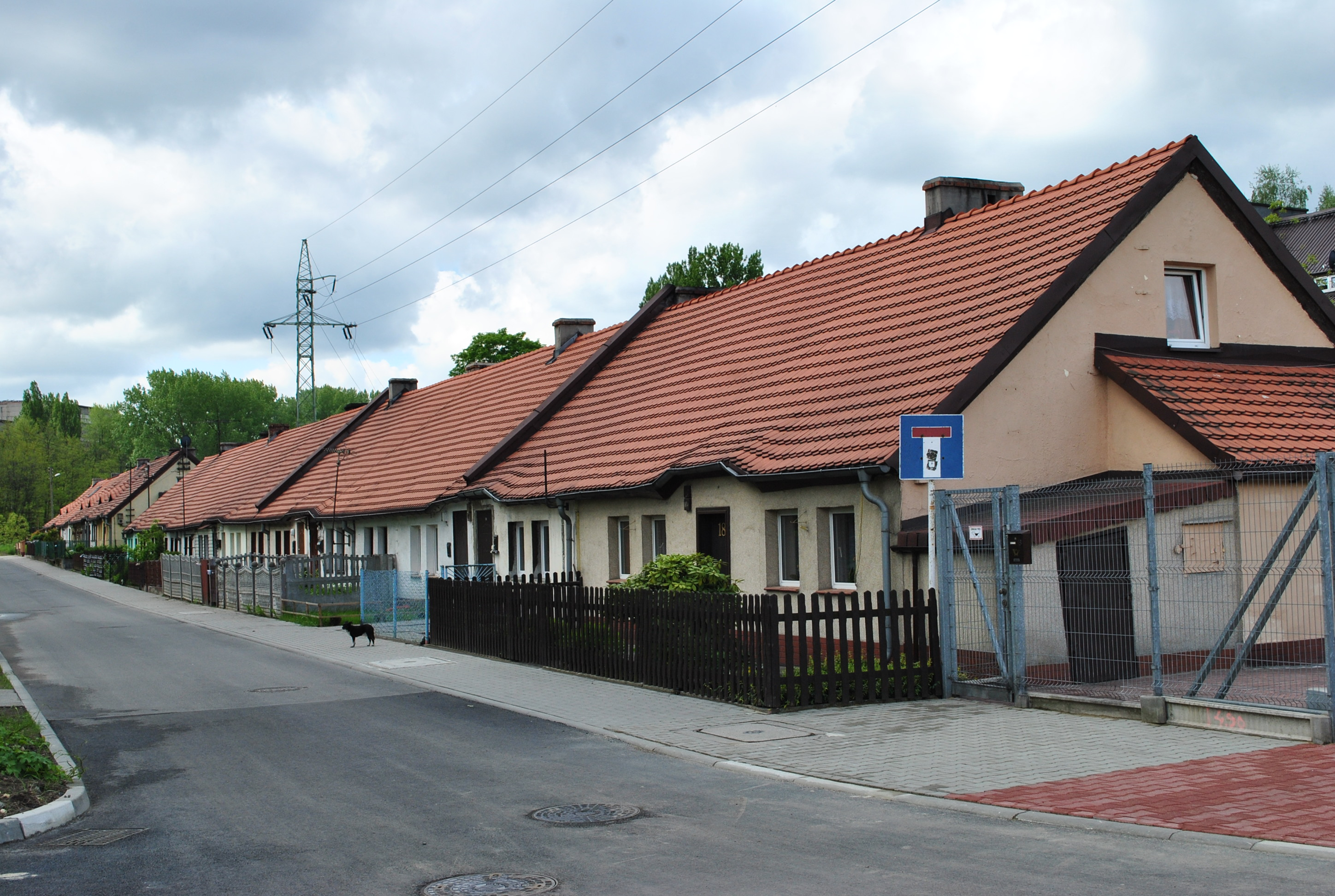
Workers' colony of the Wujek Coal Mine on Przodowników Street

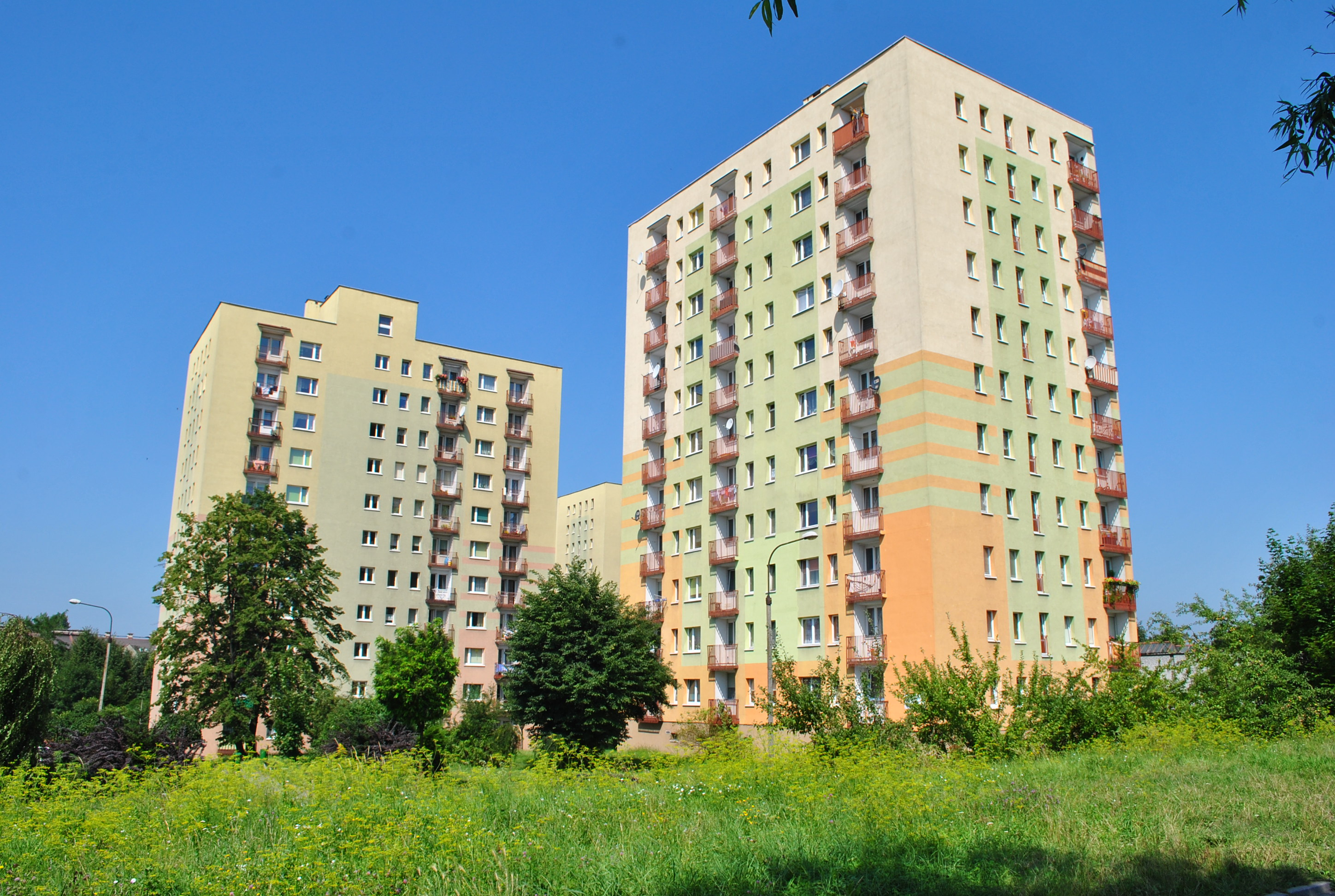
Residential estate on Wodospady Street

The district's development and its functional and spatial structure vary significantly. It is dominated by functions related to the activities of the Wujek Coal Mine, around which residential buildings are concentrated, both single-family (in the north-western and southern parts of the district) and multi-family (mainly south of the coal mine and on Wodospady, Hetmańska, and Orkana streets), as well as buildings with local service functions (in the eastern part). In 2007, built-up areas covered 23% of the district's total surface, the net floor area ratio was 0.44, and the weighted average number of storeys was 1.91.

Załęska Hałda-Brynów has many historical buildings, the most important of which are:

- Tenements (2 Boczna Street, 2, 3, 6 Bugli Street, 2, 6, 12,14, 16, 18 Hetmańska Street, 7, 8, 9 Kredytowa Street), built mainly at the beginning of the 20th century in the modern and historicist styles;
- Water tower (J. Gallus Street) built in 1902 in the historicist style;
- Former school building (1 Hetmańska Street) from the 19th century;
- School (8 Hetmańska Street) built in the 1930s in the International Style;
- Workers' estate (S. Jaracz Street, Z. Kossak-Szczucka Street, Z. Herbert Street, and G. Zapolska Street) from the 1950s;
- Tenement (76 Ligocka Street) in the Art Nouveau style;
- Tenements – familoks of the Wujek Coal Mine (78 Ligocka Street, 2, 2a, 4, 4a Filarowa Street, 6, 8, 16, 20 W. Pol Street) from the early 20th century;
- Tenement (9 Tomasza Street) built in the 1930s in the International Style;
- Workers' colony of the Wujek Coal Mine (Przekopowa and Przodowników streets) from between 1918 and 1920, often mistakenly referred to as the Colony of the Twelve Apostles.

=== Monuments and commemorative plaques ===
The following memorial sites are located in Załęska Hałda-Brynów:

- Monument to the Silesian Insurgents who died in the fight for national and social liberation (corner of Ligocka and Hetmańska streets);
- Monument to the miners of the Wujek Coal Mine who were killed on 16 December 1981 (Wincenty Pol Street, next to the Wujek Coal Mine);
- Plaque commemorating the residents of Załęska Hałda who died for freedom and democracy during World War II (junction of F. Bocheński and Załęska Hałda streets; formerly on the façade of Primary School No. 25).

== Culture ==
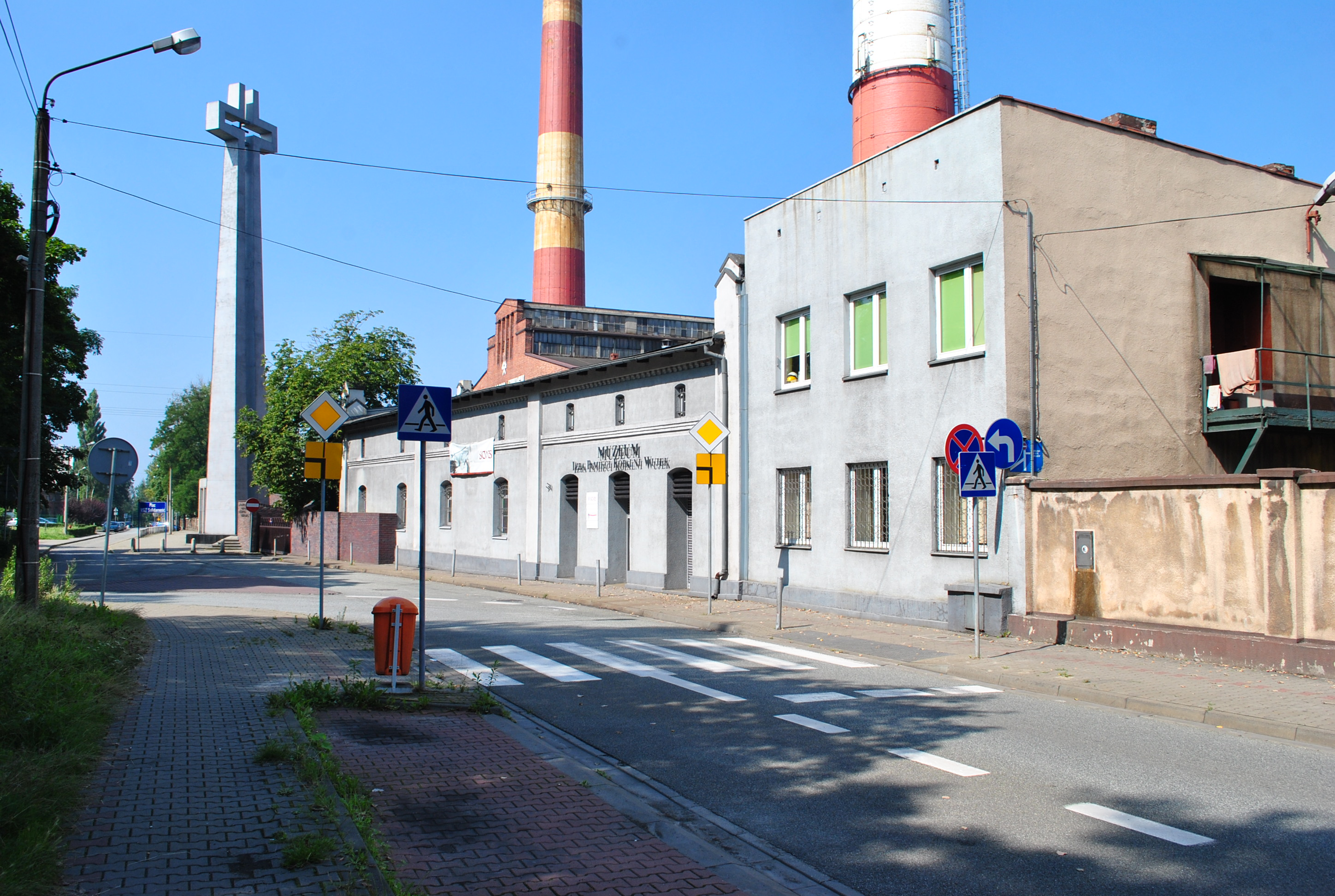
Museum – Memorial Room of the Wujek Coal Mine (38 W. Pol Street)

The district has a varied cultural scene, centered on libraries and museums. The Wujek Coal Mine had a significant impact on cultural activities. Near the facility, at 73 W. Pol Street, the Workers' Cultural Center was established in the 1970s. It had, among others, an amphitheater hall for 524 spectators.

Near the Wujek Coal Mine, the Silesian Center for Freedom and Solidarity has been operating since 16 December 2011. It is located in the building of the former mine clothing warehouse. It houses the Memorial Room of the Wujek Coal Mine, which has a permanent on the pacification of the mine on 16 December 1981. Next to Primary School No. 11 at 16 Nasypowa Street, there is the Scout Ethnographic Museum, established in the 1960s and managed by the 4th Scout Troop of the Defenders of Katowice.

There are two branches of the Municipal Public Library in Brynów and Stara Ligota. Branch No. 8 is located at 53a Brynowska Street. It houses a library for adults, and in 2014, its collection consisted of 15,408 volumes. Branch No. 32 is located in Stara Ligota at 19a J. Grzyśki Street. It has a library for children and adults, a reading room, and a literary café, and in 2014, its collection consisted of 46,601 volumes.

== Education ==
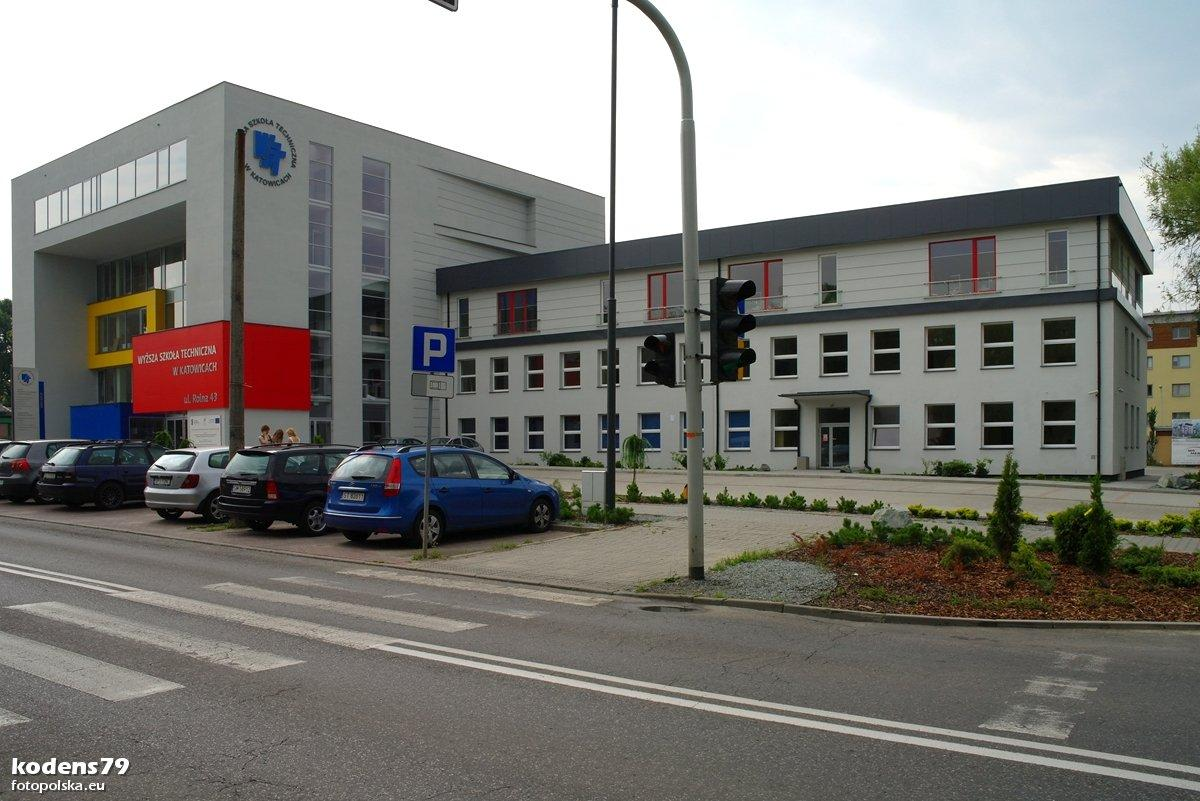
Seat of Academy of Silesia on Rolna Street

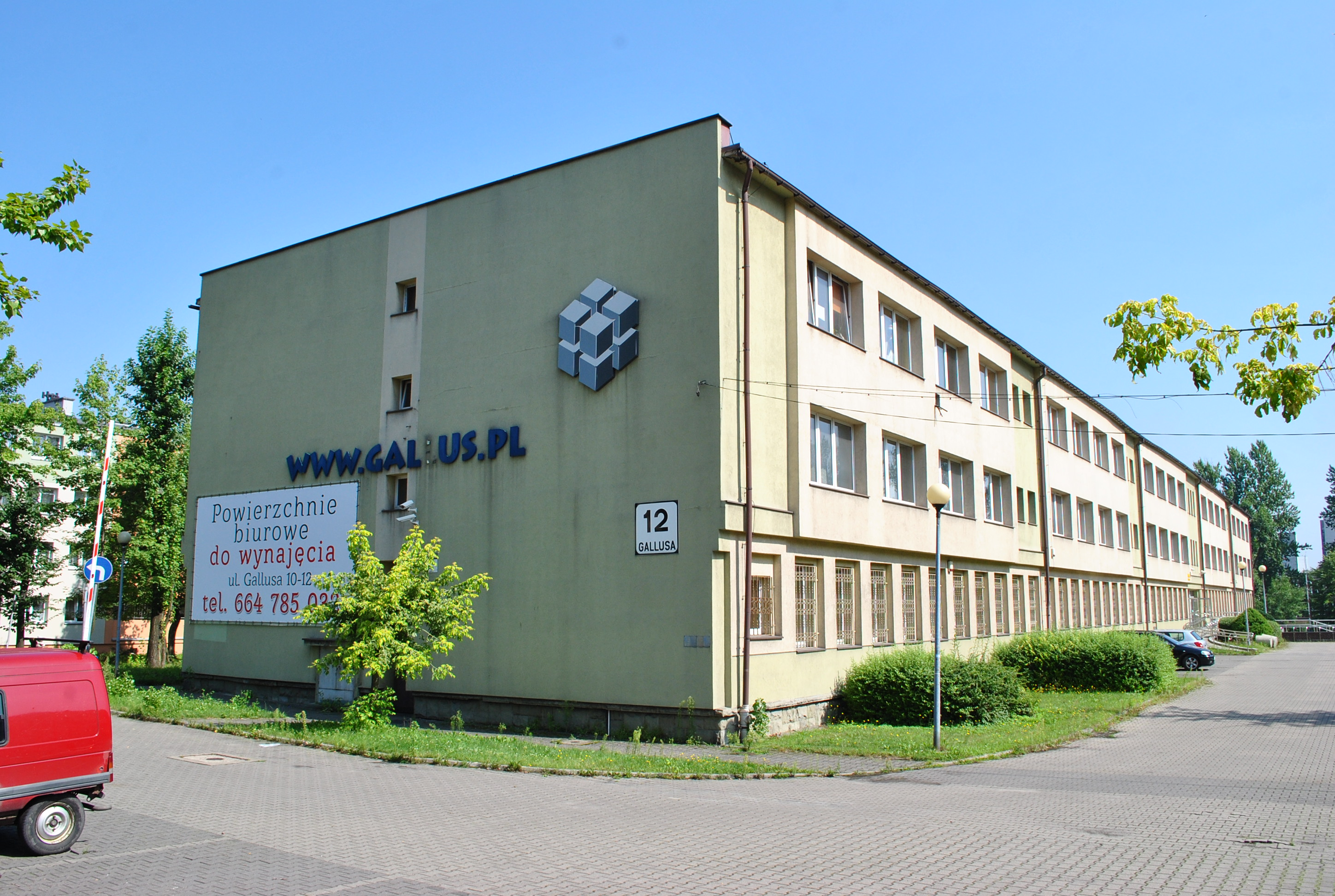
Seat of the Higher School of Marketing Management and Foreign Languages on Gallusa Street

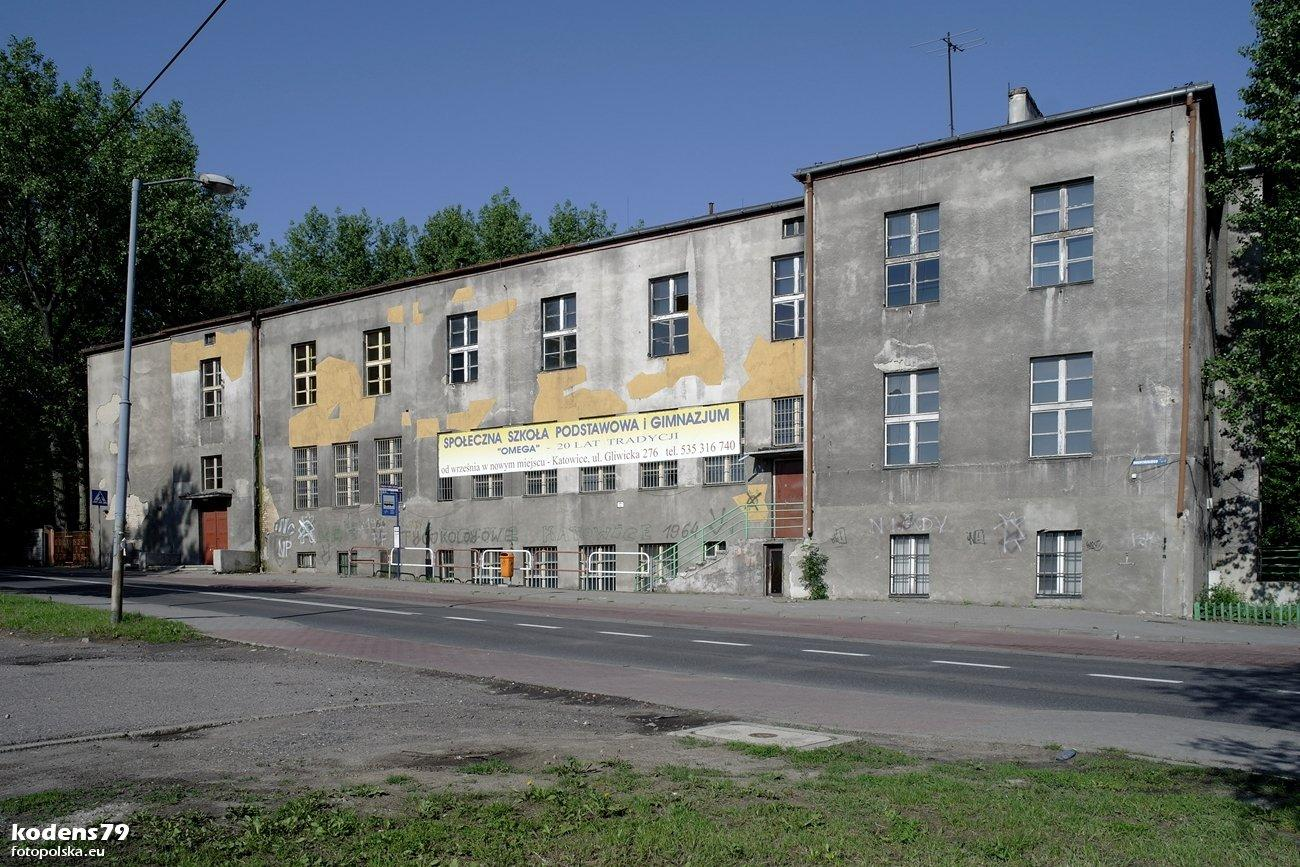
Now-demolished building of Primary School No. 25

In October 2014, the following educational institutions operated in the district, among others:

- Nurseries:
  1. Puchatkowo Nursery (5 K. Adwentowicz Street) – a private nursery established in 2009, run by Akademia Malucha;
- Kindergartens:
  1. Municipal Kindergarten No. 12 (3 Ligocka Street; branch: 43 Załęska Street) – a kindergarten located in two buildings, consisting of five departments;
  2. Municipal Kindergarten No. 51 (41 Rolna Street) – a kindergarten established in the 1950s as a two-department facility; in 2014, it had four departments with 25 children each;
  3. Municipal Kindergarten No. 88 (2 J. Grzyśki Street) – a three-department public kindergarten;
  4. Private Kindergarten No. 1 (5a Ligocka Street) – the first private kindergarten in Upper Silesia after 1989, established in 1992;
  5. Wesołe Słoneczka Private Kindergarten with Integration Classes (68 Ligocka Street);
- Primary schools:
  1. Nine Miners of Wujek Primary School No. 5 (5 J. Gallusa Street) – a public primary school, whose origins date back to 1870, when the German Catholic School in Katowicka Hałda was opened, which became a Polish school in 1921. In the 1960s, thanks to the efforts of the miners of the Wujek Coal Mine, the school was moved to a new location at 5 J. Gallusa Street. The first classes in the new building took place on 1 October 1966. At that time, the school was named after Leon Kruczkowski;
- Middle schools:
  1. Stanisław Staszic Middle School No. 22 with Integration Classes (8 Hetmańska Street) – a public middle school, whose origins are linked to a report from 1879 on the need to establish a school in Ligota. Between 1910 and 1911, it had 11 teachers and 874 students. In 1930, classes were held in three buildings at 1, 8, and 10 Hetmańska Street, where 842 children attended 20 classes. After World War II, between 1962 and 1964, the school was expanded, and in 1975, it was renamed after Stanisław Staszic. From 1999/2000, the building housed the General Education School Complex No. 22, but in June 2004, Primary School No. 8, which belonged to this complex, was closed down. In 2017, after the Ministry of National Education abolished middle schools, the facility once again became Primary School No. 8 with middle school classes, which operated until 2019.

The above institutions are concentrated in Brynów and Stara Ligota, while education in Załęska Hałda has been operating since 8 August 1873, when a two-class primary school was opened, with 195 students enrolled. On 3 September 1929, due to the old building being unsuitable, the school was moved to a new location 149 F. Bocheński Street. In 2003, Robert Oszek Integration School Complex No. 1 was established, which included, among others, Primary School No. 25. It was closed on 1 September 2006, and the Integration School Complex No. 1 was merged with Maria Dąbrowska Primary School No. 58 in Osiedle Tysiąclecia.

== Healthcare ==
The following healthcare facilities are located in the district, among others:

- Twoje Zdrowie Private Healthcare Facility, Katowice Branch (3a Ligocka Street);
- MS Therapy Center (9 Załęska Street) – a clinic specializing in the diagnosis and treatment of nervous system disorders;
- Medical and Rehabilitation Center (103 Ligocka Street) – a healthcare facility offering physiotherapy and preventive healthcare services;
- MEDINCUS Silesian Center for Hearing and Speech (18 Nasypowa Street) – a medical facility established in 2007, specializing in the treatment of hearing and speech disorders.

== Religion ==
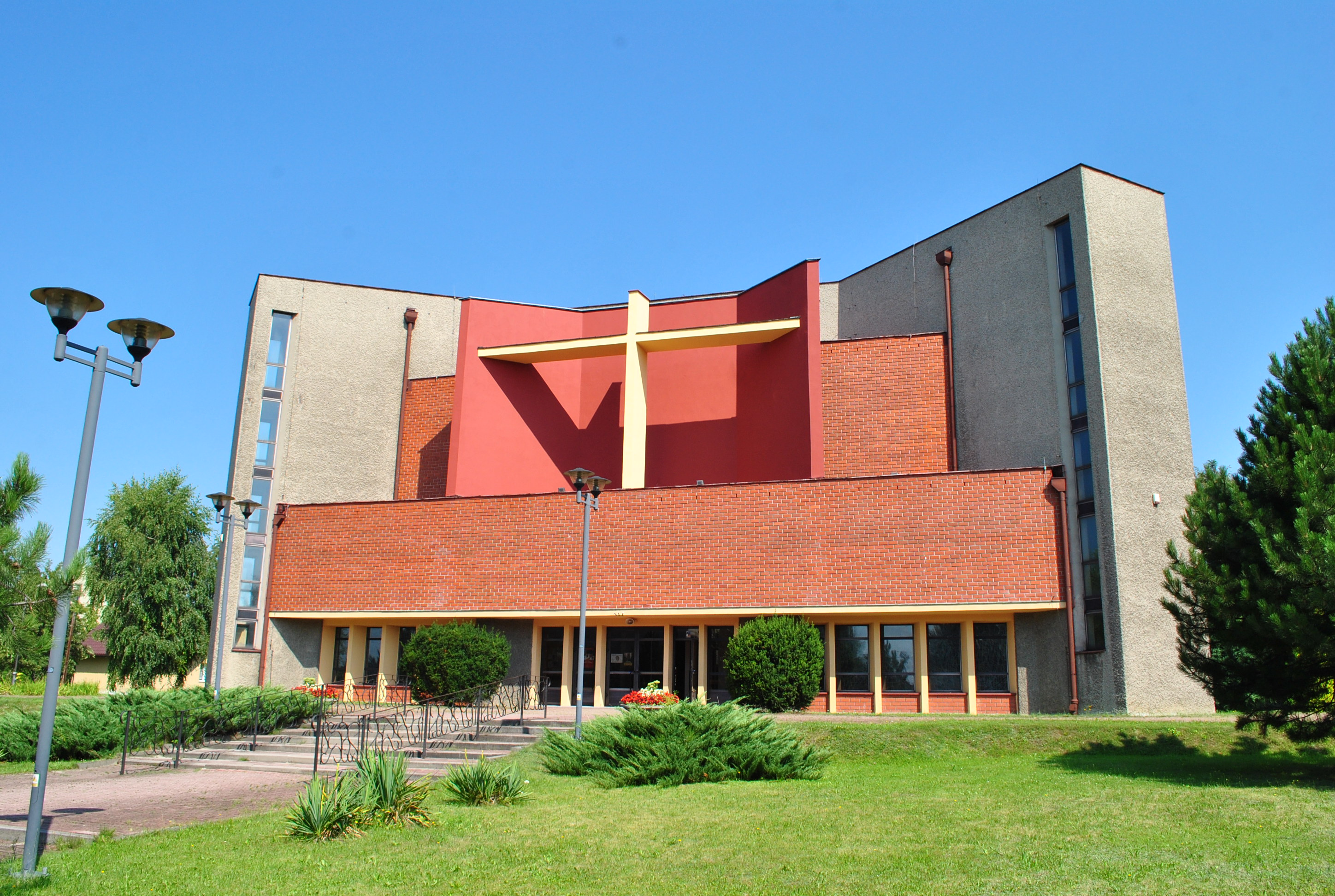
Parish church of the Parish of the Holy Family and St. Maximilian Kolbe

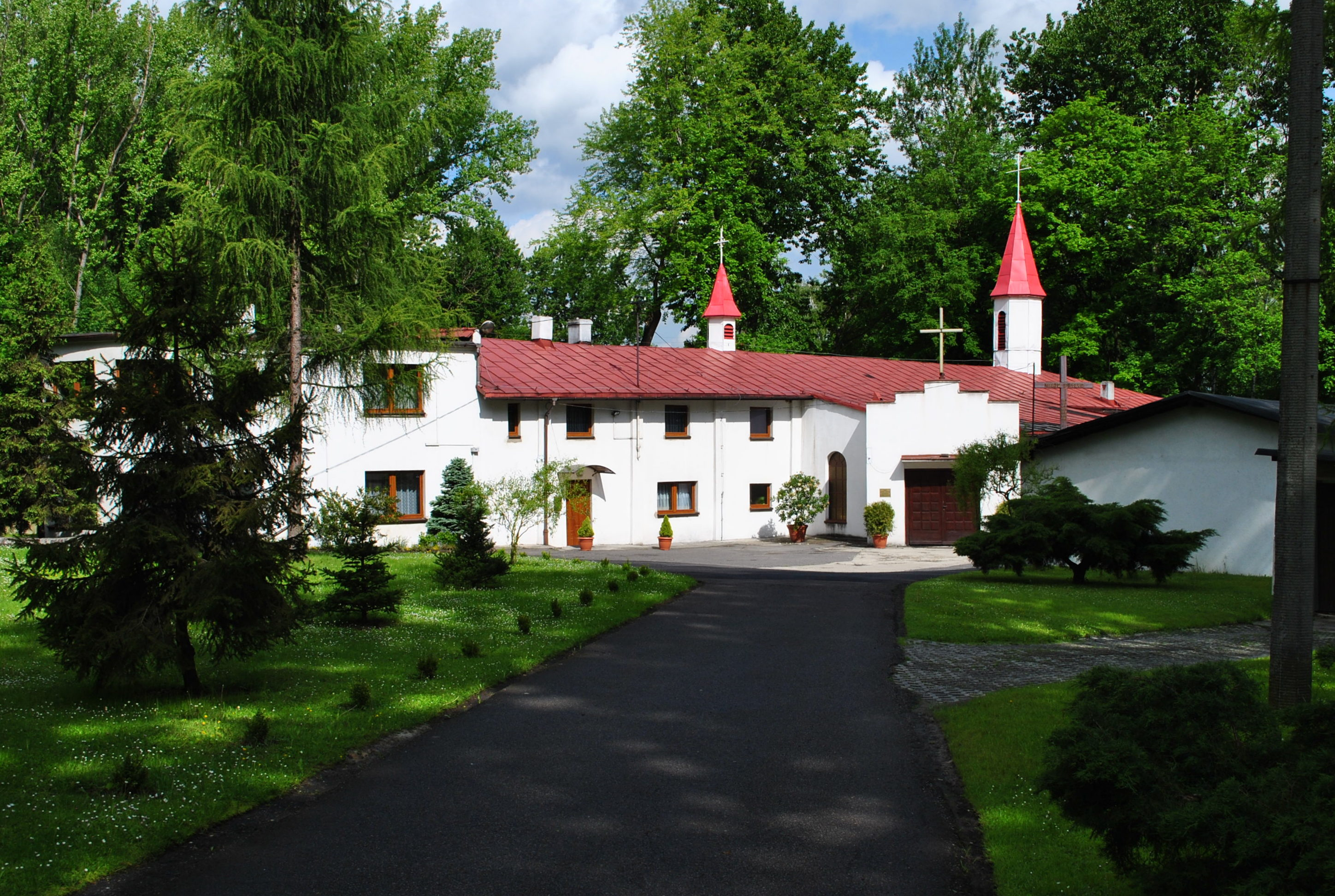
Parish church of the Parish of Saints Cyril and Methodius

Catholics are the largest religious group in Załęska Hałda-Brynów. There are three Roman Catholic parishes there:

1. Parish of the Holy Family and St. Maximilian Kolbe (24 Z. Kossak-Szczucka Street) – established on 17 October 1982, with Father Józef Nowaczyk as its first parson. The first construction works on the new parish church began in May 1984. It was dedicated by the Archbishop of Katowice, Damian Zimoń, on 9 October 1993. In 2014, the parish had about 6,000 members and covered a significant area of the southern part of the district;
2. Parish of the Most Holy Names of Jesus and Mary (12 J. Przykling Street) – a Roman Catholic parish located in the south-eastern part of Załęska Hałda-Brynów. In 2014, it had 6,951 parishioners;
3. Parish of Saints Cyril and Methodius (147 F. Bocheński Street) – covers the southern part of Załęska Hałda (northern part of the district). In 2014, it had 638 parishioners. The parish church was established in 1945 in the building of a former brickyard, while the contemporary interior design dates back to 1984.

== Sport and recreation ==
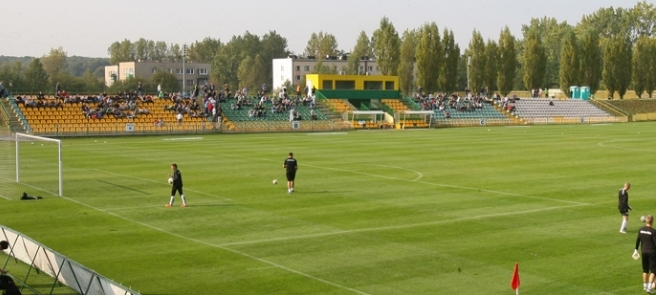
Stadium of Rozwój Katowice

There are several sports clubs in Załęska Hałda-Brynów, the largest being Rozwój Katowice, which runs a football section. The club originated from the Sokół Polish Gymnastic Society, founded in 1919. In 1925, Rozwój Katowice was registered with the Upper Silesian Regional Football Association. The club was founded by employees of the Wujek Coal Mine. In the past, it also had other sections, including volleyball, gymnastics, athletics, handball, and basketball, which were closed down in the 1980s and 1990s.

The following sports and recreation facilities are located in the district:

- KS Rozwój Stadium (28 Zgody Street) – a football complex consisting of a main pitch with a capacity of 2,400 spectators, two training pitches, and sanitary and social facilities. The stadium is managed by Rozwój Katowice;
- Rolna Swimming Complex (65 Nasypowa Street) – a year-round facility with an outdoor swimming pool, gym, sauna, solarium, and hydromassage. It is managed by the Municipal Sports and Recreation Center.

== Bibliography ==
- Absalon, Damian; Czaja, Stanisław; Jankowski, Andrzej T. (2012). "Środowisko geograficzne" [Geographical Environment]. Katowice. Środowisko, dzieje, kultura, język i społeczeństwo [Katowice: Environment, History, Culture, Language and Society] (in Polish). Vol. 1. Katowice: Museum of the History of Katowice. ISBN 978-83-8772-724-6.
- Borowy, Robert (1997). Wczoraj – dziś – jutro... kopalni „Katowice-Kloefas". Historia węglem pisana [Yesterday – Today – Tomorrow: The Katowice-Kloefas Mine: A History Written in Coal] (in Polish). Katowice: Katowice-Kloefas. ISBN 83-907139-2-6.
- Szaraniec, Lech (1996). Osady i osiedla Katowic [Settlements and Housing Estates of Katowice] (in Polish). Katowice: Artur. ISBN 83-905115-0-9.
- Szaraniec, Lech (2010). Osady i osiedla Katowic [Settlements and Housing Estates of Katowice] (in Polish). Katowice: Śląsk. ISBN 978-83-7164-636-2.
