= 2006 Halemba Coal Mine disaster =

Coal mine explosion in Poland

Coordinates: 50.2439°N 18.8519°E

- Native name: Katastrofa górnicza w kopalni Halemba
- Date: November 21, 2006; 19 years ago
- Time: 16:30 (CET)
- Location: Ruda Śląska, Poland
- Type: Mining disaster
- Cause: Methane explosion
- Deaths: 23

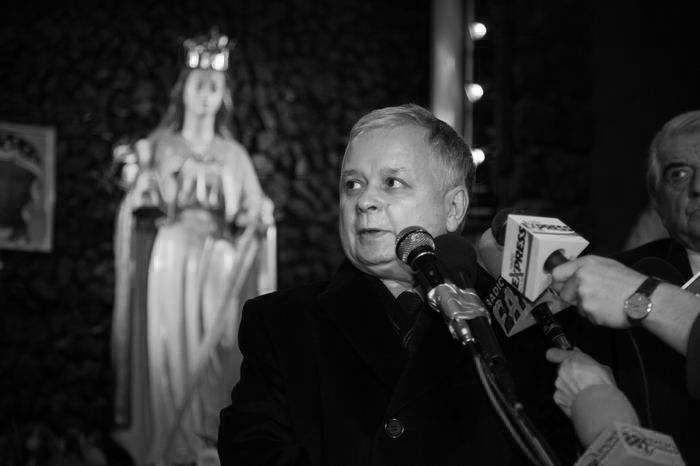
Polish president Lech Kaczyński visiting the mine a day after the explosion

The 2006 Halemba Coal Mine disaster was an accident that occurred on 21 November 2006 in the Halemba Coal Mine, Ruda Śląska, Poland. An explosion of methane and coal dust resulted in 23 fatalities. It was one of the largest mining disasters in Poland.

The mine was under the ownership of the state-run Kampania Weglowa (KW), which is the largest coal mining company in Europe. Although non-operational since March 2006 due to high concentrations of gas, miners were sent down in November to retrieve equipment.

Lech Kaczynski, then the president of Poland, visited the site after the event had occurred, and declared three days of national mourning. The Polish government also announced a fund to support family members of the victims. Additionally, a commission was set up to investigate the disaster by Poland's Higher Authority for Mining.
