= 2009 Wujek-Śląsk mine blast =

Coordinates: 50°15′N 18°56′E

Location of Ruda Śląska in Poland

The 2009 Wujek-Śląsk mine blast occurred at the Wujek bituminous coal mine in Ruda Śląska, Poland on 18 September 2009. At least 20 miners were killed (12 died in coal mine, 8 in hospitals) and at least 37 more were hospitalised. It is the country's deadliest mining accident since the deaths of 23 miners from methane at the Silesia's Halemba mine in November 2006.

== Incident ==
The incident happened approximately 1 kilometer below surface level. Around 40 people were underground at the time of the blast. Twenty-nine made it out themselves but the rest had to be assisted. Emergency services ferried the casualties to the nearest hospitals. Eighteen were hospitalised at a burns specialist unit in Siemianowice Śląskie; six were hospitalised at Sosnowiec where family members collected outside in an upset manner. Some of the deaths came quickly, whilst more did not die until some time later. Deaths were caused by burns, some of 90 degree proportions, with burns sustained to the respiratory tract. Many will require psychological assistance as well if they are to fully recover from the incident. Production was stopped but the rest of the mine remained in operation. The fire was quenched. The probable cause is thought to be methane ignition.

== Investigation ==
An investigation into the incident was quickly launched. Then-President of Poland Lech Kaczyński expressed his regrets: "On behalf of all Poles I convey the closest family members our sympathy and solidarity and join them in prayer and pain. I wish all the injured a quick return to health". Polish Minister of Interior and Administration, Grzegorz Schetyna, alongside a deputy minister of economy, greeted the families of those who died by visiting the region after the blast. Two days of national mourning commenced at 06:00 on 21 September 2009; flags were flown at half-mast. Several pre-scheduled events were called off as result of the disaster.

== List of victims ==
1. Zdzisław Batorski (43)
2. Marek Bojsza (37)
3. Janusz Cebula (45)
4. Roman Cłapka (40)
5. Roman Czarnecki (48)
6. Marek Ćmiel (43)
7. Zbigniew Garbacz (48)
8. Cezary Goszczycki (39)
9. Dariusz Grzegorzek (40)
10. Michał Heince (43)
11. Szymon Korzeniowski (24)
12. Tomasz Kurek (44)
13. Teodor Ledwoń (45)
14. Lucjan Manjura (40)
15. Jacek Nowakowski (36)
16. Anastazy Podlaszewski (38)
17. Sebastian Smyk (30)
18. Adrian Świętek (21)
19. Rafał Wcisło (22)
20. Adam Wiśniowski (38)

== See also ==
- List of mining disasters in Poland
