= Church of St. Michael the Archangel, Katowice =

Church in Katowice

Coordinates: 50°14′27.1″N 19°0′15″E

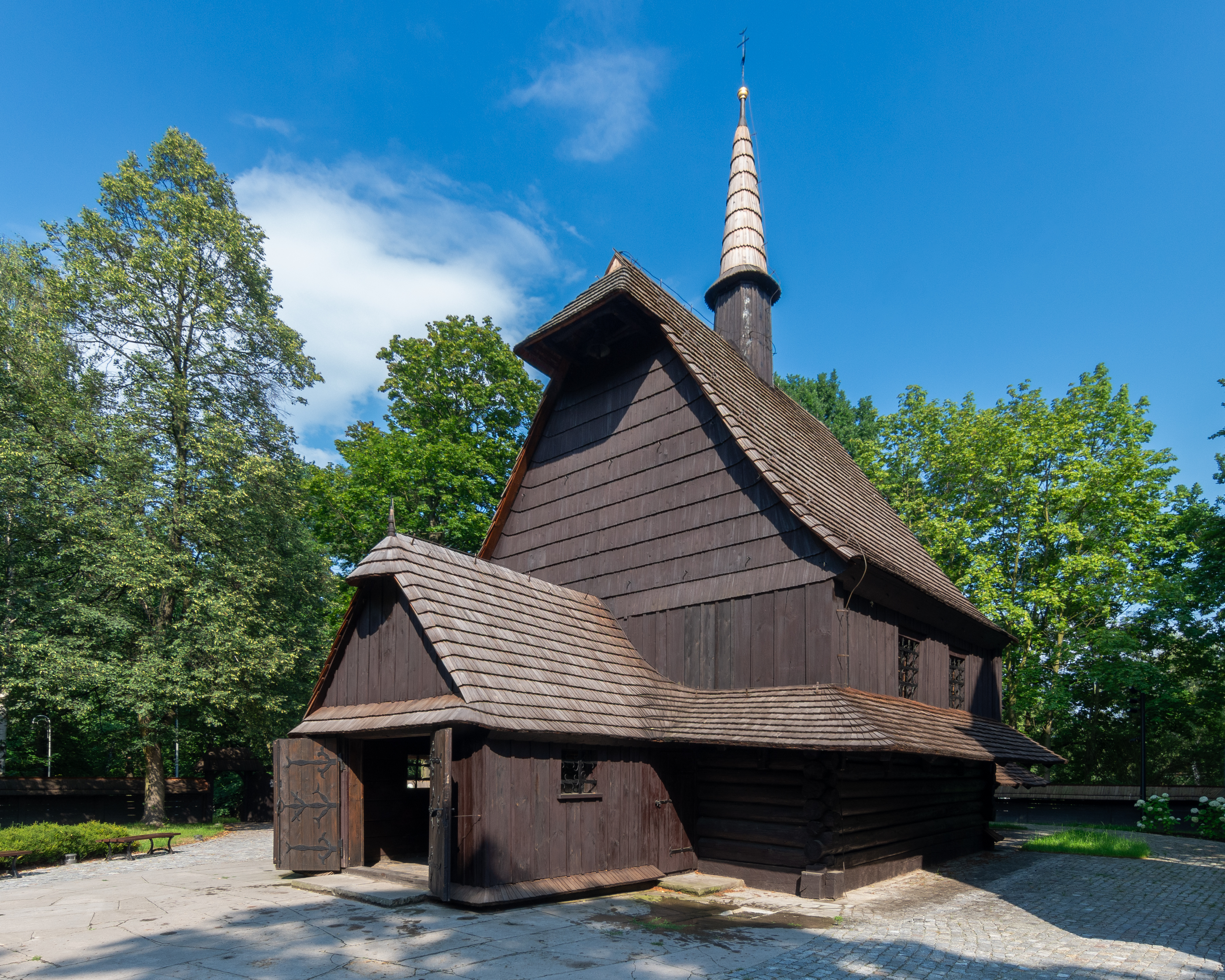
Church of St. Michael Archangel

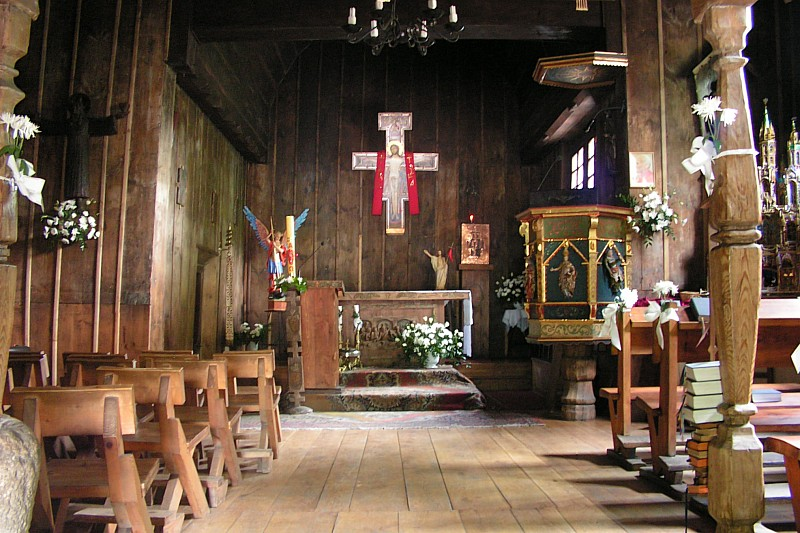
Inside of the church

Church of St. Michael Archangel (Polish: Kościół św. Michała Archanioła w Katowicach) is one of the oldest buildings in Katowice. It is located in Kościuszko Park, where it was moved in 1938 from the village Syrynia, where it was originally constructed in 1510. It is under the invocation of St. Michael.

It has end-fitted log framework construction and shingled roof. Free-standing belltower was completed before 1679; it has historic lych-gate and wooden fence around the churchyard.

== History ==
The church of St. Michael Archangel was first built in 1305 in Syrynia, near Wodzisław Śląski. At that time it had a defensive purpose; it was used by the people living in the village as a place where they could hide in, in a case of an attack. The free-standing bell tower was used as a watch tower. The church, in the form and size it is now, was built in 1510. In the 17th century a new free standing tower was built but it was replaced by the present one in 1853. In 1913 the German Kaiser, Wilhelm II, visited the church and, reportedly, admired the beauty of the church very much.

In the years 1938-1939 the church was transported to Kosciuszko Park. This was a part of a bigger project before World War II, which was to create a heritage park with examples of traditional Silesian architecture. Along with the church, a 17th-century granary from Gołkowice was also moved to Kosciuszko Park. Unfortunately it was burned in a fire in 1969. The fire did not spread and the church, belfry and the fence around were not affected.

After World War II broke out, the German occupant did not allow for the church to be opened and used for services. Towards the end of the War, bunkers and trenches were built nearby the church, however in 1945 the front line moved and the church survived. In the post-war years and after changes in the political situation in Poland, the church was for a few years forgotten and neglected. There was even an idea that the church should be moved again, this time to a park in Pszczyna. However the opinion of the specialists was such that the technical state of the church building does not allow the church to be transported.

After political changes in 1956 the situation of the church started to improve. The church was blessed for the third time and started to be used for services. The church also required immediate care and repair. In 1981 a new parish of St. Michael Archangel was created. Most of the paintings that were still on the walls in 1930’s, were washed of before the church was moved to Katowice. Many of the pieces of architectural fittings are relatively new however there are things that are much older; an example could be a baroque ambo.

== See also ==
- Saint Michael: Roman Catholic traditions and views
