= Donnersmarckhütte Mine disaster =

1923 disaster

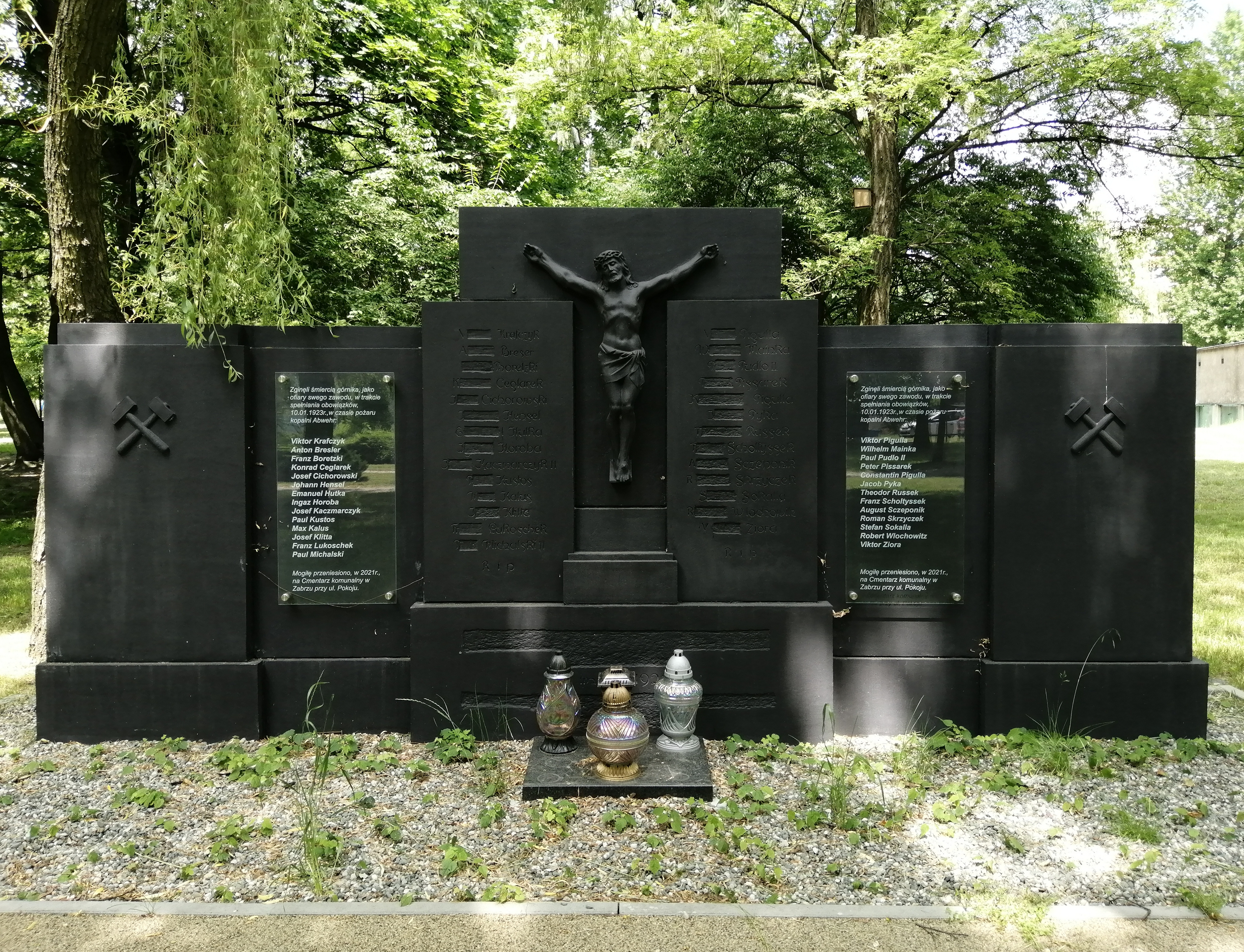
- Monument to the victims of the disaster at the former cemetery in Mikulczyce
- Date: January 10, 1923
- Location: Mikulczyce Weimar Republic; 50°20′30.11″N 18°47′20.66″E
- Type: mining disaster (coal-seam fire)
- Deaths: 45 people
- Injuries: 2 or 3 people

The Donnersmarckhütte Mine disaster was a coal mine fire that occurred on 10 January 1923 at the Donnersmarckhütte mine in Mikulczyce, Upper Silesia, at the time in the Weimar Republic although now part of Poland. The fire spread through the mine after being started by a malfunction of an underground railway locomotive, and claimed the lives of 45 miners.

== Historical background ==
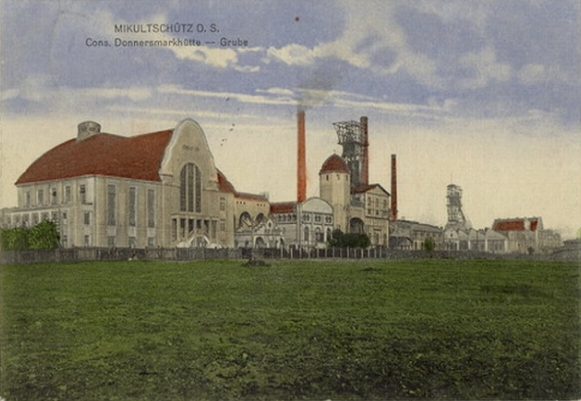
Donnersmarckhütte mine buildings on a colored postcard from around 1912

The beginnings of coal mining in the area of Mikulczyce (German: Mikultschütz) in the eastern part of Upper Silesia and the Kingdom of Prussia date back to the 1870s. After previous geological surveys, mining fields such as Zabrze, Neue Abwehr, Deutsch Lothringen, Jungfrau Metz, and Saargemünd were established in this area. In 1873, they became part of the property of the Donnersmarckhütte AG conglomerate, which also owned the ironworks in Zabrze. In 1901, the sinking of the Adolf and Elisabeth shafts began, using innovative technical solutions for the time, such as freezing rock layers. Two years later, the Neue Abwehr field was put into operation, and on 22 August 1906, the coal mine named Donnersmarckhüttegrube (translated as "Donnersmarck Ironworks Mine") was officially opened.

In everyday language, as well as in press publications, materials, and documents of the company, the mine was often referred to as Abwehrgrube, after the name of the first mining field exploited. However, this name was officially introduced only in 1927, when the plant was taken over by the Castellengo-Abwehr mining company, co-owned by the Donnersmarck and Ballestrem families.

Following the 1921 Upper Silesia plebiscite, the Mikultschütz/Mikulczyce area remained part of the Germany, though only about 5 km from the border with Poland. The area was later transferred to Poland in 1945.

== Course of the disaster ==
On the evening of Wednesday, 10 January 1923, between 7:30 PM and 8:00 PM, at a depth of 282 meters underground in the Hugo seam, a failure occurred in an underground railway locomotive powered by benzol or gasoline. During operation, a bolt in the machine fractured, and its fragments damaged the crankshaft bearing. As a result, the piston ejected from the cylinder, damaging the pipe connecting the engine to the fuel tank. This led to a fuel leak and subsequently an explosion.

The explosion ignited a fire that, due to damage to the pipeline supplying compressed air, was further fueled and spread rapidly through the mine's corridors. The fire caused the wooden supports in the working area to collapse quickly. Miners working in the vicinity of the incident attempted to escape through an unused inclined passage connecting the 280 and 380 seams, but it was partially obstructed and required clearing.

== Rescue operation ==
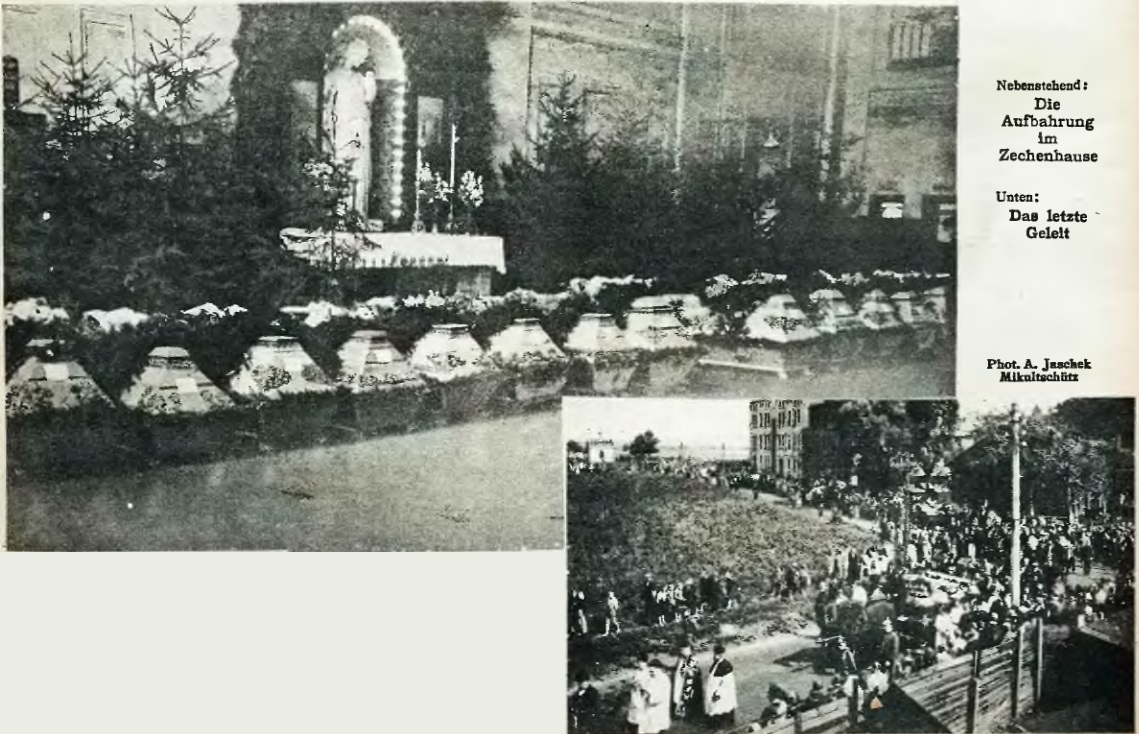
Funeral ceremonies for the victims of the disaster, 30 August 1924

Immediately after the incident, a rescue operation commenced, involving mine rescuers, firefighters, and the support of local hospitals and clinics. According to various press reports, one miner managed to leave the workings on his own, while two others were rescued during the operation or saved themselves by reaching a ventilation dam just before it was sealed to contain the fire.

Initial attempts were made to extinguish the fire. However, the mine management and experts soon concluded that under the circumstances, none of the missing miners could have survived the accident. On Saturday, January 13, Upper Silesian newspapers, including Katolik and Der oberschlesische Wanderer, published a list of the disaster's victims. Initially, reports cited 43, 45, or 46 victims. Ultimately, the death toll was confirmed to be 45. The first three bodies of miners were recovered on Sunday, January 14, but the operation was halted after a few days due to the ongoing fire, which posed a danger to rescuers. To prevent the fire from spreading and enable mining to resume, the affected area was sealed off with firewalls.

Financial assistance for the widows and orphans of the deceased miners was provided by, among others, Wrocław Bishop Adolf Bertram, President of the Reich Friedrich Ebert, Chancellor Wilhelm Cuno, and the Donnersmarckhütte AG concern.

On 31 January 1923, exactly three weeks after the tragedy in Mikulczyce, another disaster struck Upper Silesian mining. A gas and coal dust explosion at the Heinitz mine in nearby Rozbark claimed the lives of 145 miners.

== Funerals and commemoration of the victims ==
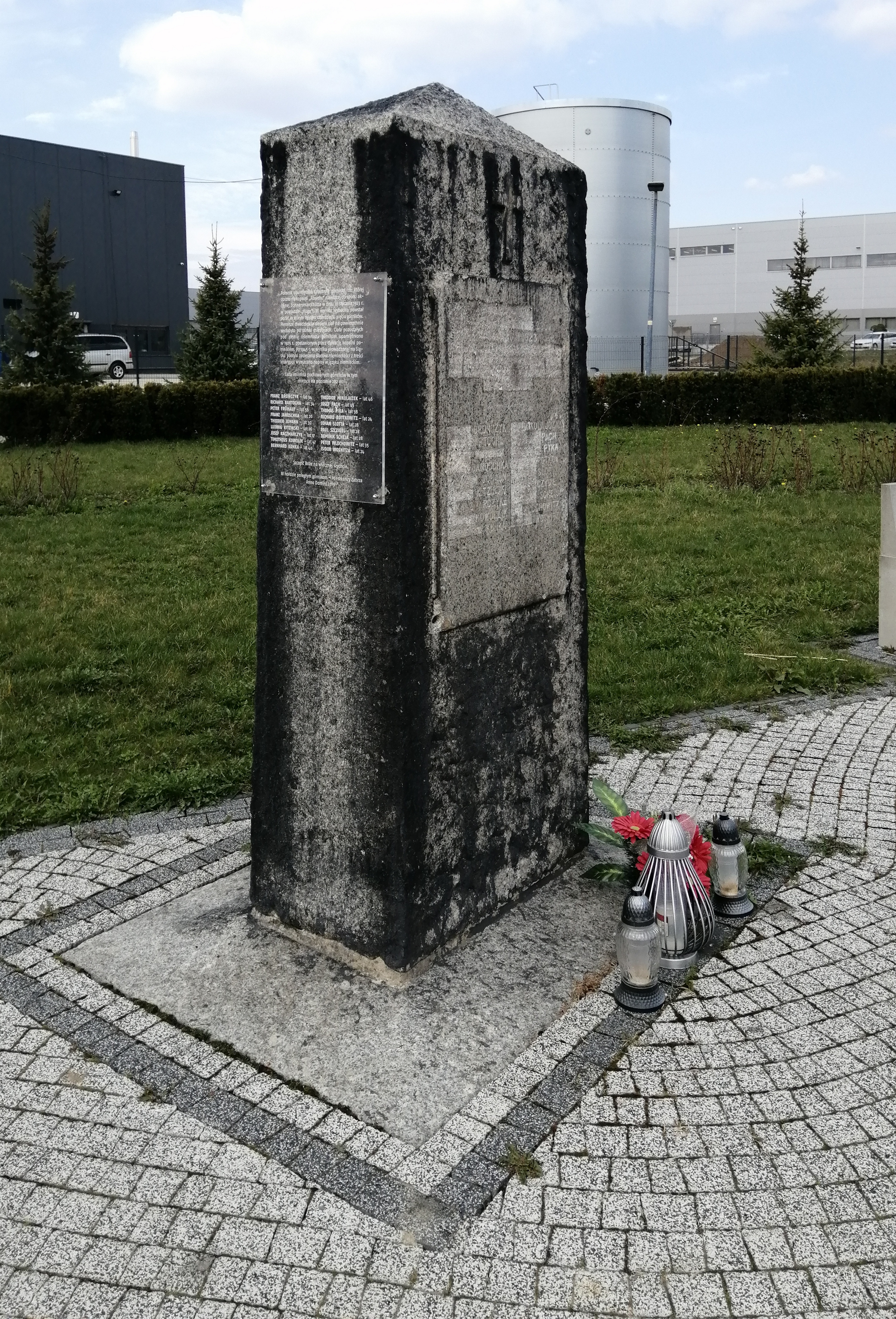
Obelisk unveiled at the site of the disaster in 1925

On January 17, the funerals of the first three victims whose bodies had been recovered from the mine took place: Franz Boretzki and Franz Lukoschka from Mikulczyce, and Emanuel Hutka from Wieszowa. It was not until a year and a half later, in the second half of August 1924, that it became possible to descend to the disaster site and recover the remains of more victims. By August 29, a total of 19 bodies had been retrieved; access to the others was obstructed by debris caused by the fire. On August 30, a ceremonial funeral for the deceased miners was held, starting at the mine's main hall. Their remains were interred in a mass grave at the cemetery located on what is now Gabriela Zapolska Street in Zabrze (the cemetery was closed in the 1950s).

In 1925, a monument was erected by the grave at the Mikulczyce cemetery to commemorate the victims of the disaster. It consisted of black-painted sandstone slabs, with a cross bearing a figure of Christ at its center and plaques listing the names of 27 fallen miners alongside symbols of mining lamps on its sides. Likely shortly after World War II, the monument was vandalized – the German inscription about the disaster and the German-sounding names of the victims were chiseled off. In 2021, the monument was restored, with the miners' names recreated on transparent glass plaques. The victims' remains were exhumed and reburied at the municipal cemetery on Pokoju Street in Zabrze.

Also in 1925, an obelisk approximately 2 meters tall was erected near the Wesoła manor (German: Vorwerk Wesolla) between Mikulczyce and Rokitnica, marking the approximate location of the disaster and commemorating the 18 victims whose bodies could not be retrieved. As part of the postwar "denazification" of Upper Silesia, the German inscriptions on the obelisk were also removed. After the war, the Wesoła manor became a State Agricultural Farm, and the monument, located in a remote area, remained forgotten for years. Today, it is situated within the Katowice Special Economic Zone and has been restored and highlighted by the creation of a small park around it. A glass plaque was added to the side of the monument with the restored names of the miners, but otherwise with a Polish inscription.

Another tribute to the victims of the Donnersmarckhütte mine disaster is the naming of one of the streets in Zabrze – Poległych Górników Street (Fallen Miners Street).

== Bibliography ==
- Rygus, P. (2023). Tragedia górnicza w kopalni "Donnersmarckhüttegrube" ("Abwehr") w Mikulczycach z 1923 roku [The Mining Tragedy at the "Donnersmarckhüttegrube" ("Abwehr") Mine in Mikulczyce in 1923] (in Polish). Zabrze: Illustris. ISBN 978-83-953848-5-1.
