= Pniówek, Silesian Voivodeship =

Pniówek
- Village
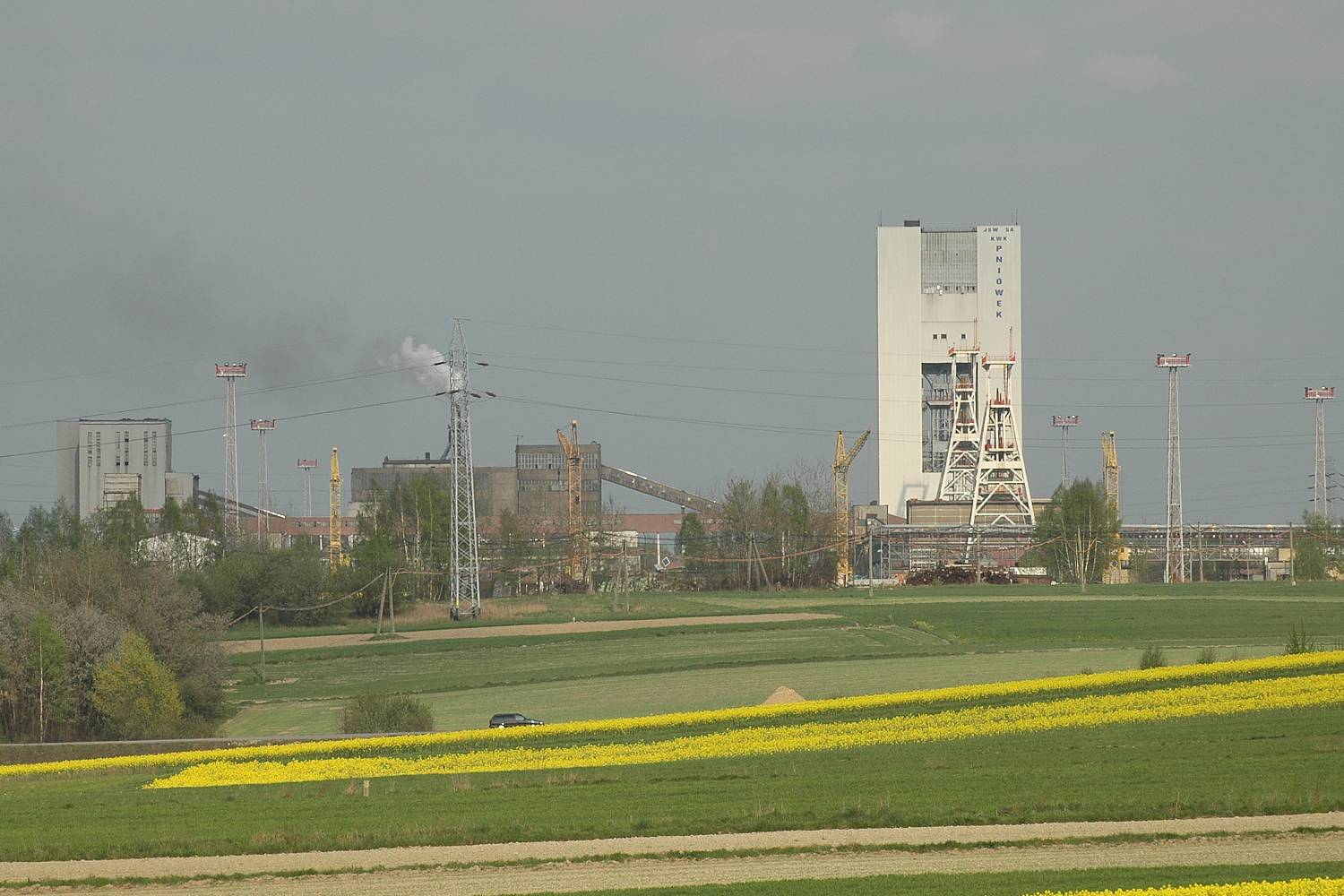
- Pniówek coal mine

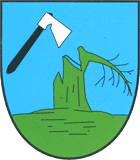
- Coat of arms

- Location within Poland
- Coordinates: 49°57′53″N 18°40′25″E
- Country: Poland
- Voivodeship: Silesian
- County: Pszczyna
- Gmina: Pawłowice
- Area: 4.4 km^{2} (1.7 sq mi)
- Population: 548
  - Density: 120/km^{2} (320/sq mi)

Pniówek (Polish pronunciation: [ˈpɲuvɛk]) is a village in the administrative district of Gmina Pawłowice, within Pszczyna County, Silesian Voivodeship, in southern Poland.

Pniówek coal mine is located in Pniówek.
