= Kościuszko Park =

Park in Katowice, Poland

Coordinates: 50.2456°N 19.0042°E

- Park im. Tadeusza Kościuszki
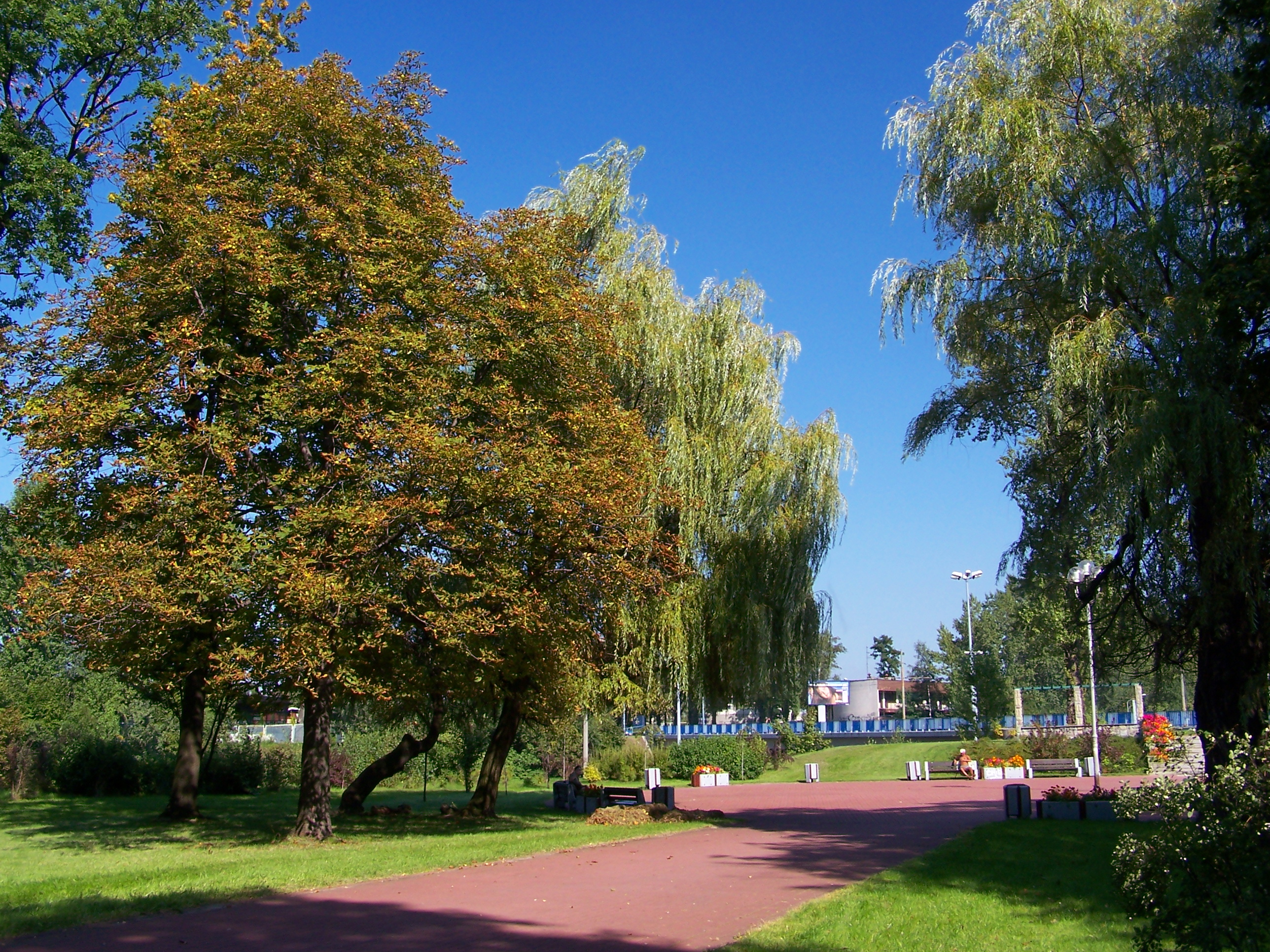
- Interactive map of Kościuszko Park
- Location: Katowice, Poland
- Area: 72 hectares
- Status: Open

The Kościuszko Park, which has existed since 1925, is one of the most famous and frequented parks in Katowice, Poland. It is situated at the street of the same name.

Its foundation dates back to 1888 when a municipal park was founded on the 6 ha area of suburban grove. The present area of the park is 72 ha. Its arrangement is influenced by English gardens-parks, which is emphasized by an alley of roses turned to wild. There are flower arrangements on the flower-beds and pergolas and classicistic gardens. After dusk the park is lit by stylish street lamps.

In the park there are several structures, such as a commemorative plaque funded for the patron, Tadeusz Kościuszko, by the people of Katowice in 1925. The parachute tower also dates back to that time. It is currently being rebuilt to its height of 40 m; it was erected as a training structure. Not far from it there is a monument commemorating the heroic participation of scouts in the defence of the town against the Nazi invaders in 1939. Two wooden structures, Upper Silesia, a manorial granary from 1688 (burnt in 1970) and the Church of St. Michael Archangel, a wooden church under the invocation of St. Michael from 1510 moved from Syrynia, were placed in the park. The park also houses a permanent gallery of plein-air sculpture, collecting works of famous artists of the region: Zygmunt Brachmanski, Augustyn Dyrda, Joachim Krakowczyk, Piotr Latoska, Jacek Sarapata, Andrzej Szczepaniec.

In winter children can use a toboggan track and a ski route. The Soviet soldiers who died in 1945 are also buried there. The Park Hall, erected in the 1950s, is situated opposite the park and holds 3.500 people. At present it is a grocery/supermarket. Nearby there is a military cemetery from the interbellum, and toward the centre there is a sports stadium of the Physical Training Academy.
