= Pniówek Coal Mine =

Coal mine in Jastrzębie-Zdrój, Poland

Pniówek coal mine
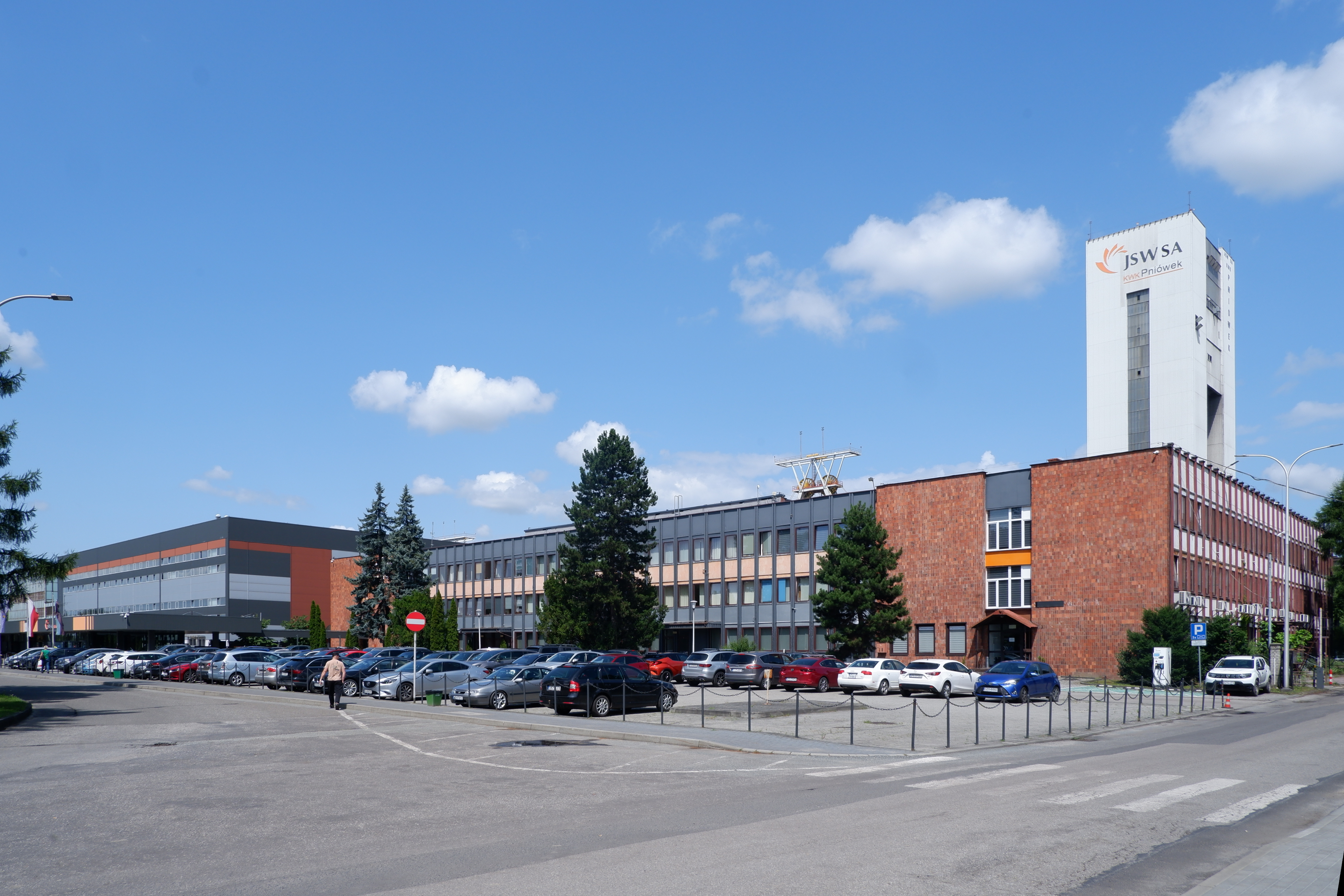

- Location in Poland
- Location: Pniówek, Silesian Voivodeship, Poland; 49°58′02″N 018°41′23″E
- Products: Coal
- Production: 5,160,000
- Opened: 1981
- Company: Jastrzębska Spółka Węglowa

The Pniówek coal mine is a large mine in the south of Poland in Pniówek, Silesian Voivodeship, 350 km south-west of the capital, Warsaw. Pniówek represents one of the largest coal reserves in Poland, having estimated reserves of 101.3 million tonnes of coal. The annual coal production is around 5.16 million tonnes.
