= Wujek Coal Mine =

Coal mine in Katowice, Poland

Coordinates: 50°14′41.19″N 18°59′16.57″E

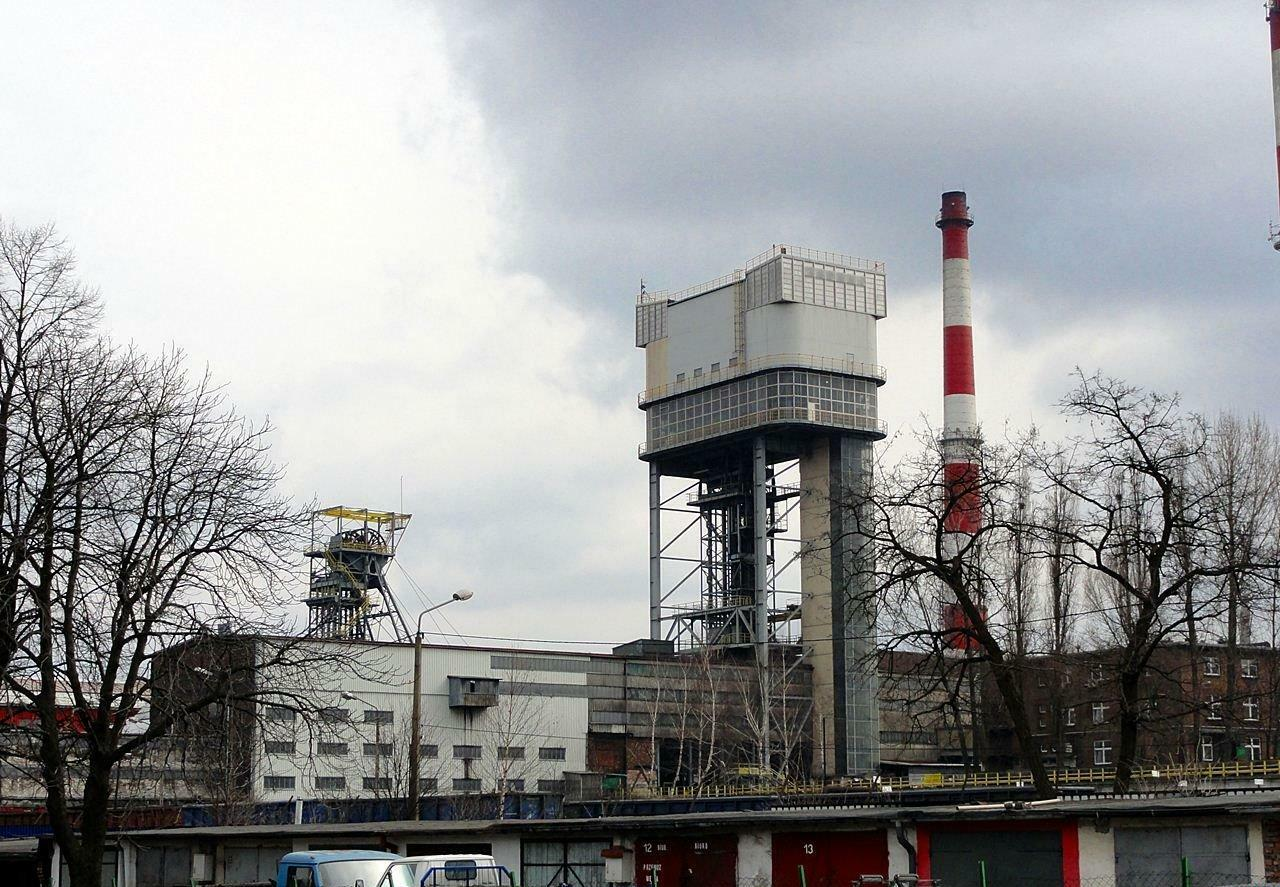
Wujek Coal Mine around 2011

Wujek Coal Mine (Polish: Kopalnia Wujek, full name in Polish: Kopalnia Węgla Kamiennego „Wujek”; German: Oheim) is a coal mine in Katowice, Poland. It is widely known in Poland as the place of the massacre of striking miners in 1981 (most often referred to by the euphemism 'Pacification'), as well as being the site of a deadly mining accident in 2009.

Mining operations began in the vicinity as early as the 16th century. The present mine, Oheim, was established in 1899 by a merger of six mining operations existing in Silesia (then a part of Germany). The peak Polish production was in 1979 (3.88 million tons that year).

Currently, the Wujek mine produces sub-bituminous coal with a typical energy content of 30000-35000 kJ/kg, volatile content of 30-31%, ash content of less than 5%, and sulfur content of less than 0.6%.

On 1 April 2017, the Wujek mine was taken over by Polska Grupa Górnicza (pl), and in 2021, it was connected to the Murcki-Staszic Coal Mine (pl:Kopalnia Węgla Kamiennego „Murcki-Staszic”) via an underground passageway. Since then, both formerly independent mines are now operated as a single entity called Staszic-Wujek Coal Mine (pl:Kopalnia Węgla Kamiennego „Staszic-Wujek”).

The name "Wujek" means "Uncle" in Polish.
