= Half-mast =

Flag flying below the summit of a ship mast, a pole on land, or a pole on a building

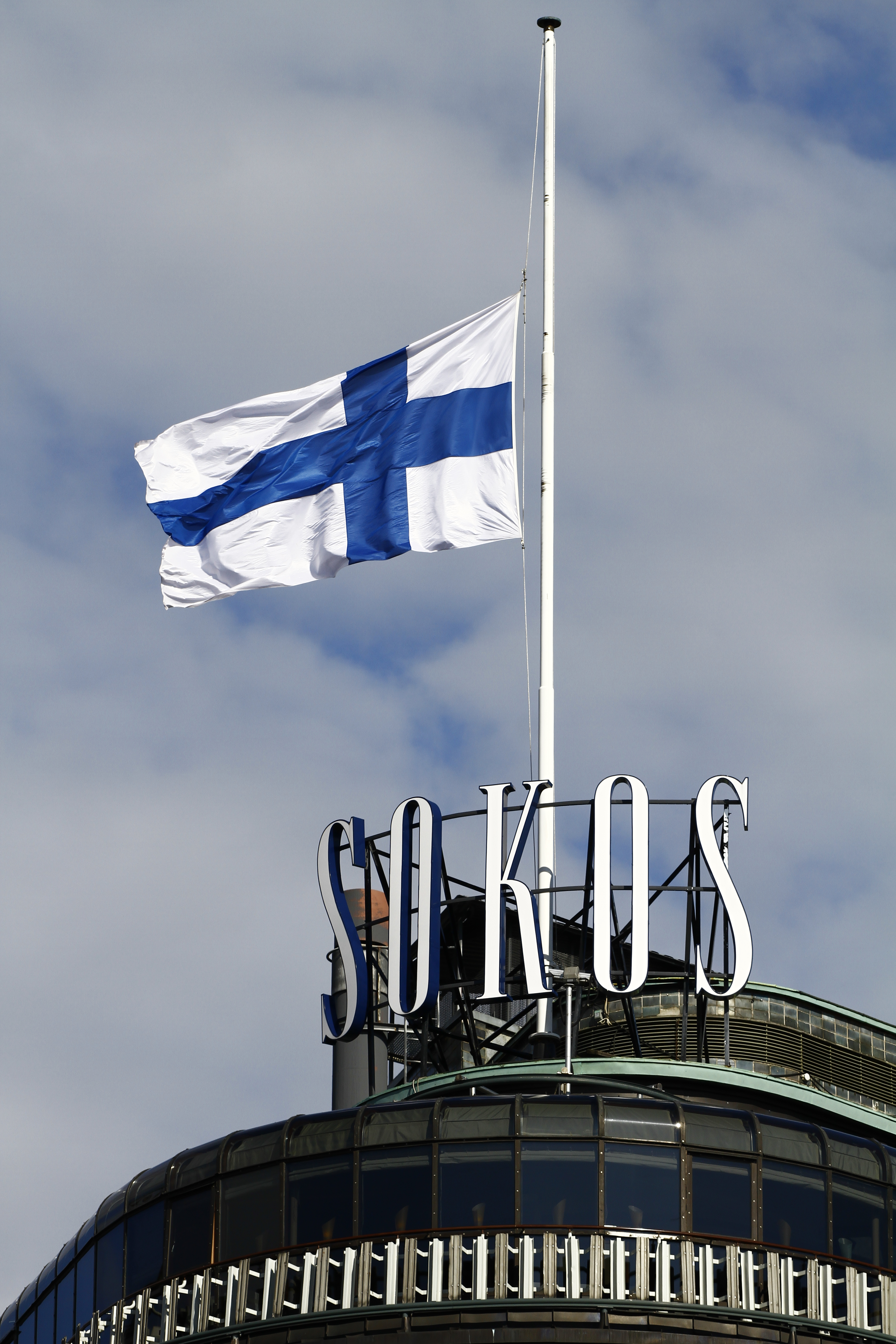
The Finnish flag flying at half-mast after the 2011 Norway attacks

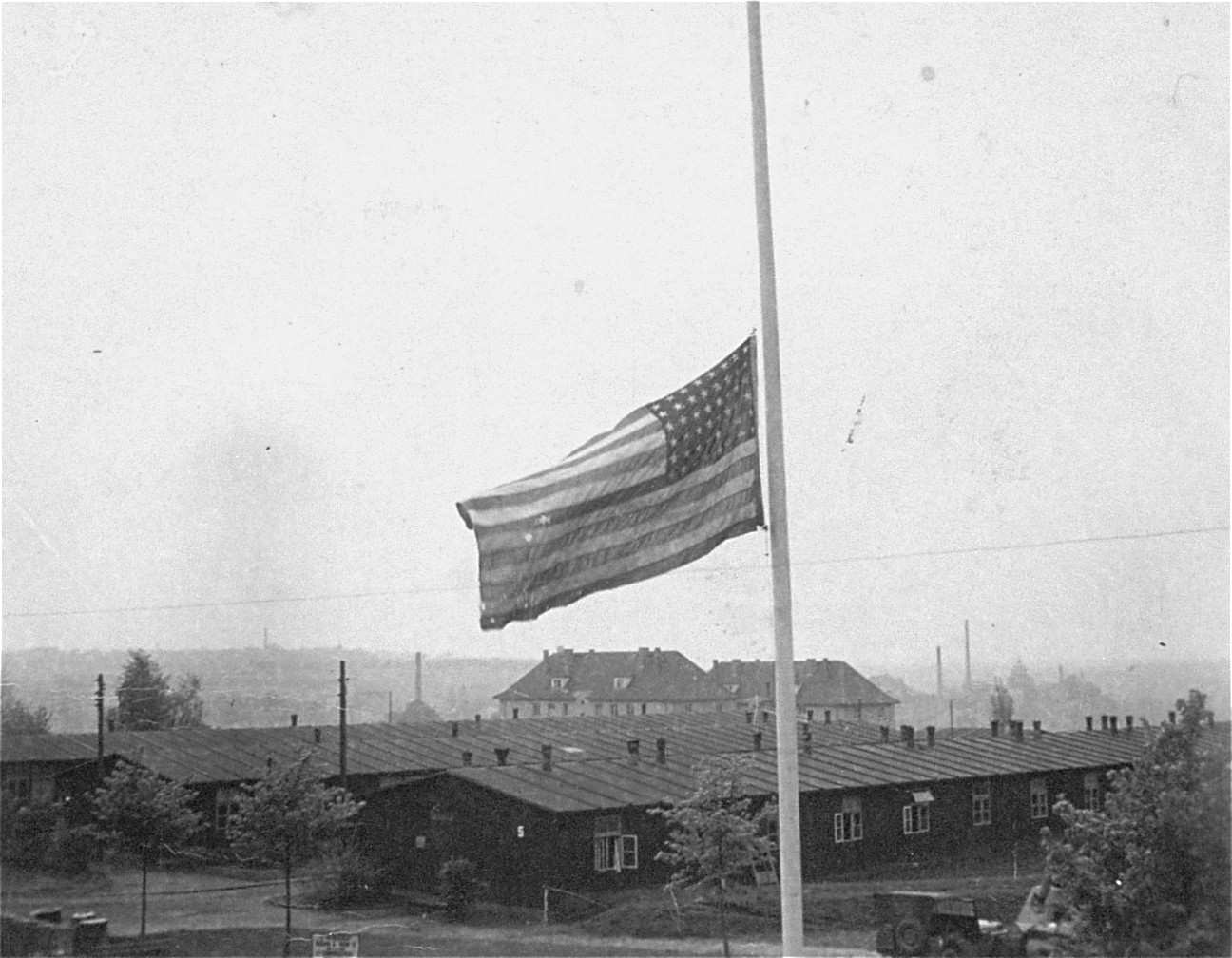
The American flag flying at half-mast in Buchenwald, Germany, on 19 April 1945 after the death of US President Franklin D. Roosevelt

Half-mast (or half-staff in American English) is the placement of a flag below the summit of a ship mast, a pole on land, or a pole on a building. In many countries this is seen as a symbol of respect, mourning, distress, or, in some cases, a salute.

The tradition of flying the flag at half-mast began in the 17th century. According to some sources, the flag is lowered to make room for an "invisible flag of death" flying above. It is often recommended that a flag at half-mast be lowered only as much as the hoist, or width, of the flag.

It is common for the phrase to be taken literally and for a flag to be flown only halfway up a flagpole, although some authorities deprecate that practice.

When hoisting a flag that is to be displayed at half-mast, it should be raised to the finial of the pole for an instant, then lowered to half-mast. Likewise, when the flag is lowered at the end of the day, it should be hoisted to the finial for an instant, and then lowered.

== Half-mast in countries, regions and institutions ==
=== Australia ===
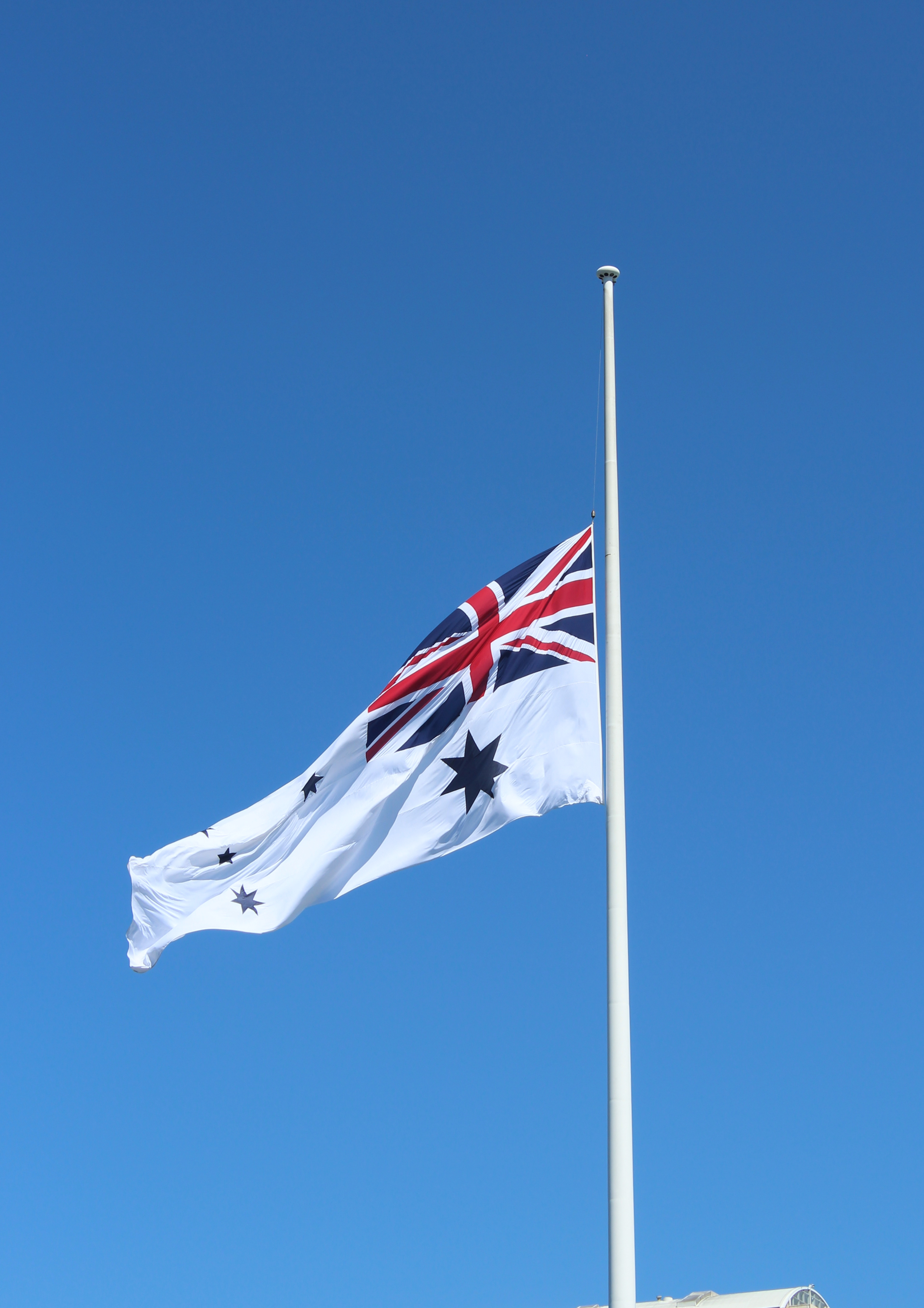
The Australian White Ensign flying at half-mast. In accordance with British tradition, the flag is flying only one flag's width below the top of the flag pole.

The flag of Australia is flown half-mast in Australia:

- On the death of the sovereign – from the time of announcement of the death up to and including the funeral. On the day the accession of the new sovereign is proclaimed, it is customary to raise the flag to the peak from 11 a.m.;
- On the death of a member of a royal family;
- On the death of the governor-general or a former governor-general;
- On the death of the head of state of another country with which Australia has diplomatic relations – the flag would be flown on the day of the funeral;
- On ANZAC day the flag is flown half-mast until noon;
- On Remembrance Day flags are flown at peak until 10:30 am, at half-mast from 10:30 am to 11:03 am, then at peak the remainder of the day;
- On the death of a distinguished Australian citizen. Flags in any locality may be flown at half-mast on the death of a notable local citizen or on the day, or part of the day, of their funeral. Recent examples include the death of naturalist Steve Irwin, actor Heath Ledger, esteemed international opera singer Dame Joan Sutherland, and former Prime Minister Gough Whitlam. In the case of cricketer Phillip Hughes, who died after being struck by a bouncer during a Sheffield Shield cricket match, the Australian flag was flown at half-mast at Cricket NSW headquarters on 27 November 2014 – the day of his death, as well as on the Sydney Harbour Bridge and at Lord's Cricket Ground in London.
- At times of natural disaster such as bushfires or tragedy. For example, in the days immediately following the Black Saturday bushfires, many flags of all types were flown at half-mast in spontaneous acknowledgement of the enormous loss of life; the then prime minister announced that the Australian flag would be flown at half-mast on 7 February, in remembrance of the victims. On 19 July 2014, the Australian flag flew half-mast across the country in tribute to the lives lost in the Malaysia Airlines Flight 17 incident. On 16 December 2014, flags on all NSW government buildings, including the Sydney Harbour Bridge, flew at half-mast after the 2014 Sydney hostage crisis.
- On the death of international political friends to the country. Recent examples include President of Vanuatu Baldwin Lonsdale or former Japanese prime minister Shinzo Abe.

In Australia and other Commonwealth countries, merchant ships "dip" their ensigns to half-mast when passing an RAN vessel or a ship from the navy of any allied country.

=== Bangladesh ===
The flag of Bangladesh flew at half-mast on the International Mother Language Day 21 February, to pay homage to the martyrs of the Bengali language movement in 1952, which took place to establish Bangla as the state language of the then East Pakistan (present-day Bangladesh).

=== Brazil ===
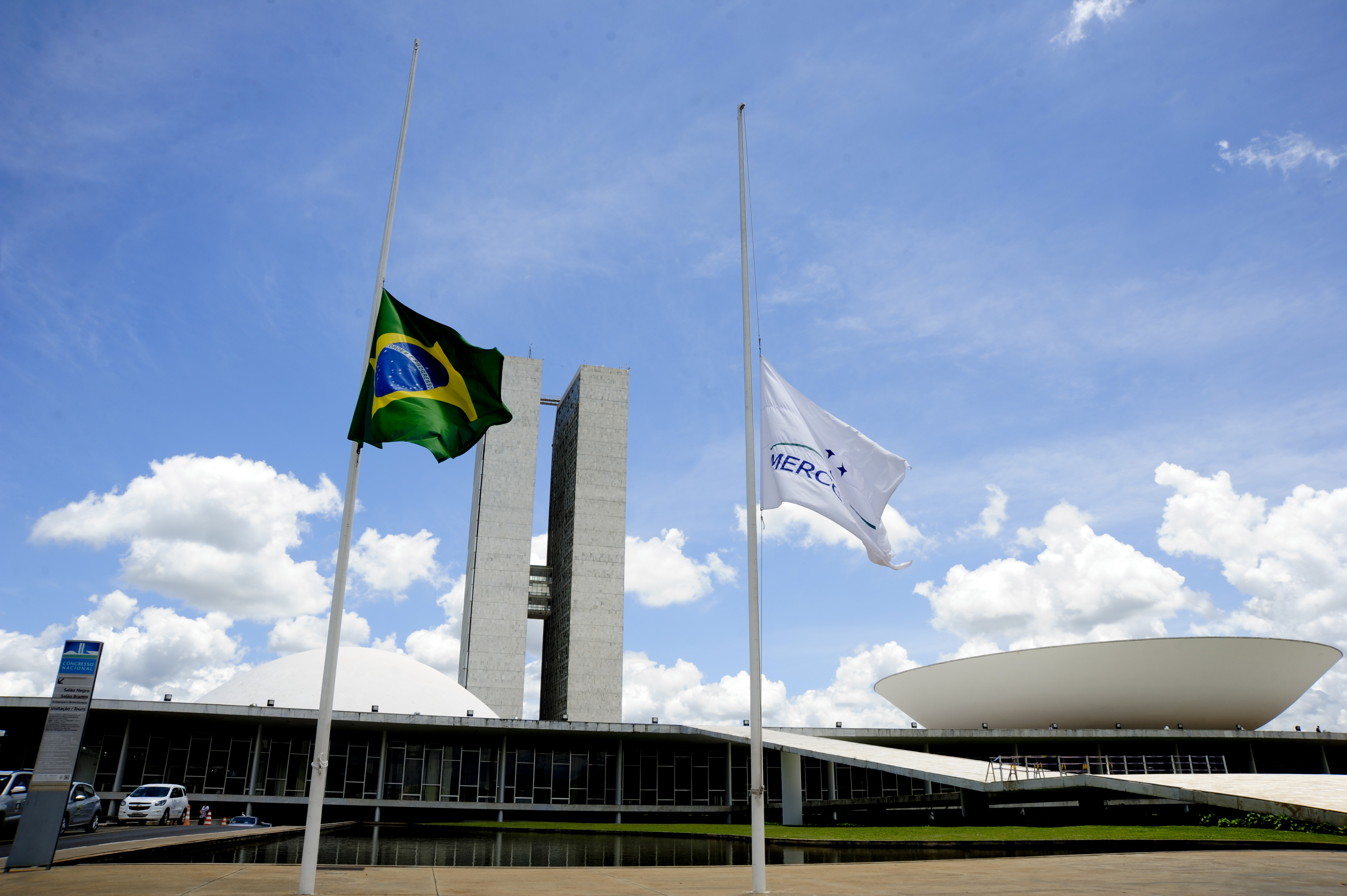
The Brazilian flag flying at half-mast beside the Mercosul flag in front of the National Congress of Brazil in memory of the victims of the Chapecoense crash on 29 November 2016

The flag of Brazil is flown half-mast when national mourning is declared by the president. This usually happens when a personality dies, or in the occasion of a tragedy.

=== Cambodia ===
The flag of Cambodia flew at half mast upon the death of King-Father Norodom Sihanouk for seven days, from 15 to 22 October 2012.

=== Canada ===
The term half-mast (French: en berne) is the official term used in Canada, according to the Rules For Half-Masting the National Flag of Canada. The decision to fly the flag at half-mast on federal buildings rests with the Department of Canadian Heritage. Federally, the national flag of Canada is flown at half-mast to mark the following occasions:

Occasion or date	Protocol or significance
The death of the sovereign	From the time of notification of death until sunset on the day of the funeral or memorial service, but the flag is flown at full-mast on the day which the accession of the new monarch is proclaimed
The death of any member of the royal family, a former governor general, the sitting chief justice of the Supreme Court, sitting ministers of the Crown, or a former prime minister	From the time of notification of death until sunset on the day of the funeral or, if there is to be a memorial service, from the time of notification of death until sunset the following day and from sunrise to sunset on the day of the service
The death of a police officer in the line of duty.	The flag could be flown at half-mast from a couple of days to weeks, depending on the ranking of the officer.
28 April of each year	Marking the Day of Mourning for People Killed or Injured in the Workplace (coinciding with World Day for Safety and Health at Work)
23 June of each year	Marking the National Day of Remembrance for Victims of Terrorism
Last Sunday in September of each year	Marking Police Officer's National Memorial Day
8 November of each year	Marking National Aboriginal Veterans Day
11 November of each year	Marking Remembrance Day
6 December of each year	Marking the National Day of Remembrance and Action on Violence Against Women

Certain events are also marked by flying the national flag at half-mast on the Peace Tower at Parliament Hill. These include:

Date	Significance
9 April of each year	Marking Vimy Ridge Day
Varies	The annual memorial service on Parliament Hill to remember deceased parliamentarians

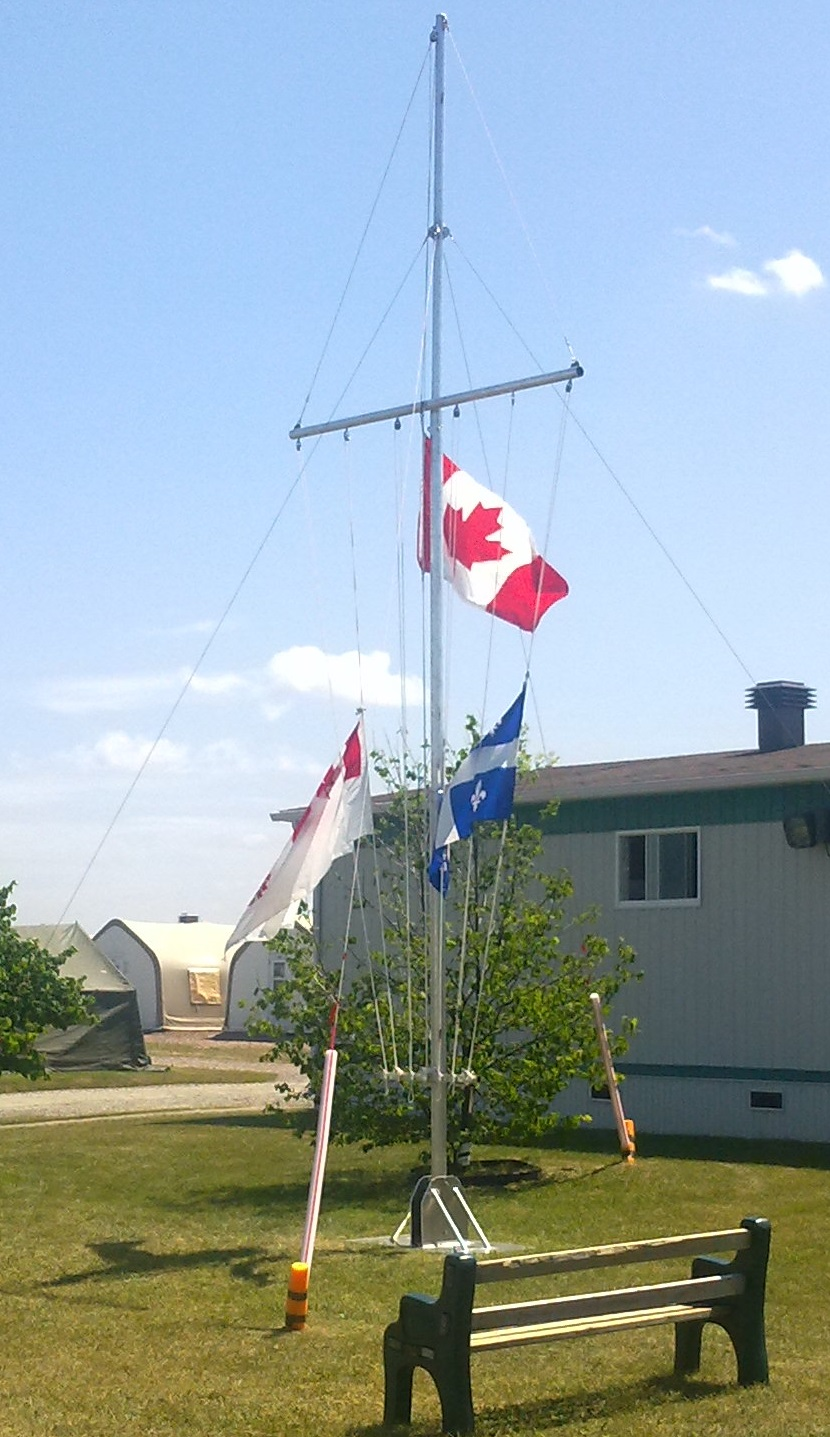
The flag of Canada, the flag of Québec, and the flag of the Royal Canadian Sea Cadets are half-masted on board Bagotville Cadet Summer Training Centre, following the train derailment and explosion in Lac Mégantic, Québec.

On occasion discretion can dictate the flying of the national flag at half-mast, not only on the Peace Tower, but on all federal facilities. Some examples include 11 September 2001, 11 September 2002, the 2004 Indian Ocean tsunami, the 2005 Mayerthorpe tragedy, the death of Pope John Paul II, the 2005 London bombings, the death of Smokey Smith, the state funerals of former U.S. presidents Ronald Reagan, Gerald Ford and Jimmy Carter, the death of Jack Layton, the 2020 Nova Scotia attacks, and the 2022 Saskatchewan stabbings.

There are, however, exceptions to the rules of half-masting in Canada: if Victoria Day or Canada Day fall during a period of half-masting, the flags are to be returned to full-mast for the duration of the day. The national flag on the Peace Tower is also hoisted to full mast if a foreign head of state or head of government is visiting the parliament. These exemptions, though, do not apply to the period of mourning for the death of a Canadian monarch. The Royal Standard of Canada also never flies at half-mast, as it is considered representative of the sovereign, who ascends to the throne automatically upon the death of their predecessor. Each province can make its own determination of when to fly the flag at half-mast when provincial leaders or honoured citizens pass away.

To raise a flag in this position, the flag must be flown to the top of the pole first, then brought down halfway before the flag is secured for flying. When such mourning occurs, all flags should be flown at that position or not be flown at all, with the exception of flags permanently attached to poles.

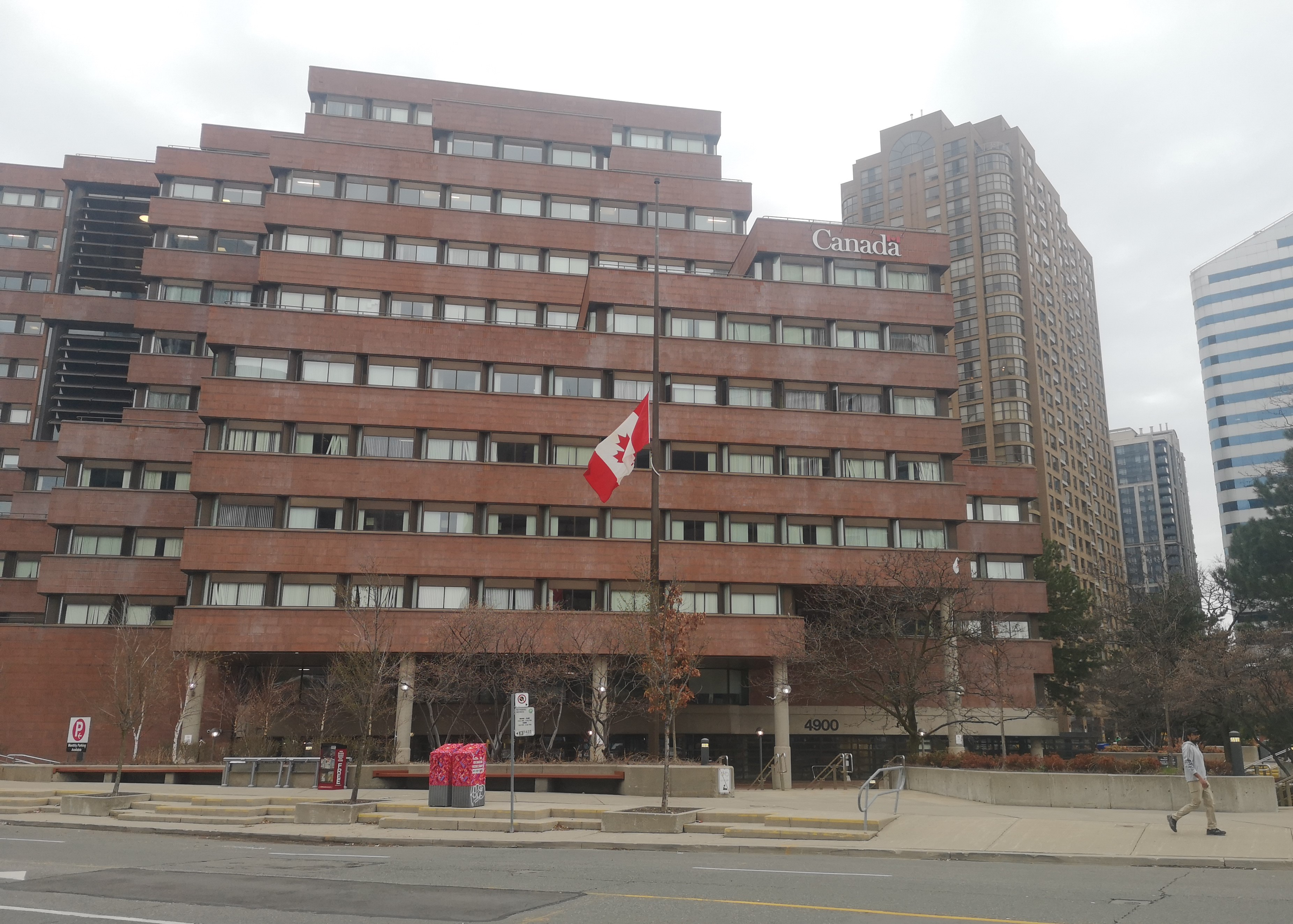
The flag of Canada at half-mast outside the Joseph Shepard Building in Toronto, following the death of Prince Philip, Duke of Edinburgh, 2021

A controversy surfaced in April 2006, when the newly elected Conservative government discontinued the practice, initiated by the previous Liberal government following the Tarnak Farm incident, of flying the flag at half-mast on all government buildings whenever a Canadian soldier was killed in action in Afghanistan. The issue divided veterans' groups and military families, some of whom supported the return to the original tradition of using Remembrance Day to honour all soldiers killed in action, while others felt it was an appropriate way to honour the fallen and to remind the population of the costs of war. In spite of the federal government's policy, local authorities have often decided to fly the flag at half-mast to honour fallen soldiers who were from their jurisdiction, including Toronto and Saskatchewan.

=== China ===
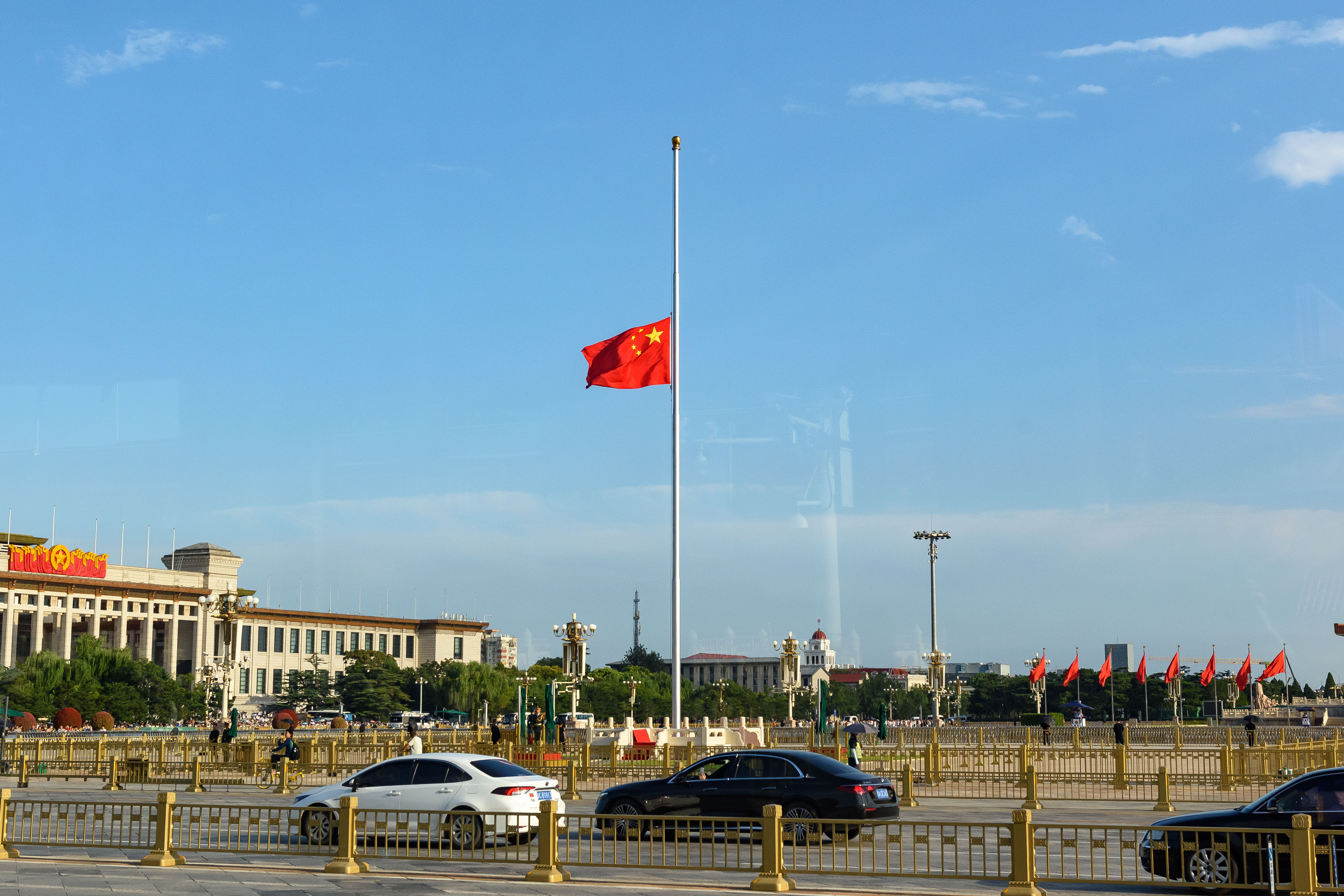
National flag of China is flown at half-mast at Tian'anmen Square on the day of Zhu Rongji's funeral on 18 August 2026.

The National Flag Law provides for a number of situations on which the flag should be flown at half-mast, and authorizes the State Council to make such executive orders:

- On the death of the General Secretary of the Chinese Communist Party (paramount leader), president, premier, chairman of the Standing Committee of the National People's Congress, chairman of the Central Military Commission, chairman of the Chinese People's Political Consultative Conference, and those who have made major contributions to the People's Republic of China, or to world peace or advancement of the mankind. For example, the flag was flown at half-mast after the death of the late Zhou Enlai (1976), Zhu De (1976), Mao Zedong (1976), Soong Ching-ling (1981), Hu Yaobang (1989), Li Xiannian (1992), Deng Xiaoping (1997), Yang Shangkun (1998), Qiao Shi (2015), Wan Li (2015), Li Peng (2019), Jiang Zemin (2022), Li Keqiang (2023), Wu Bangguo (2024), Zhu Rongji (2026) and Tung Chee Hwa (2026), as well as death of foreigners such as Joseph Stalin (1953), Patrice Lumumba (1961), Charles de Gaulle (1970) and Norodom Sihanouk (2012).
- When major disasters happen, such as when the flag was flown at half-mast from 19–21 May 2008, the three national mourning days for the 2008 Sichuan earthquake, as well as at 4 April 2020 (Qingming Festival) as the national mourning day for the COVID-19 pandemic.

=== Cuba ===
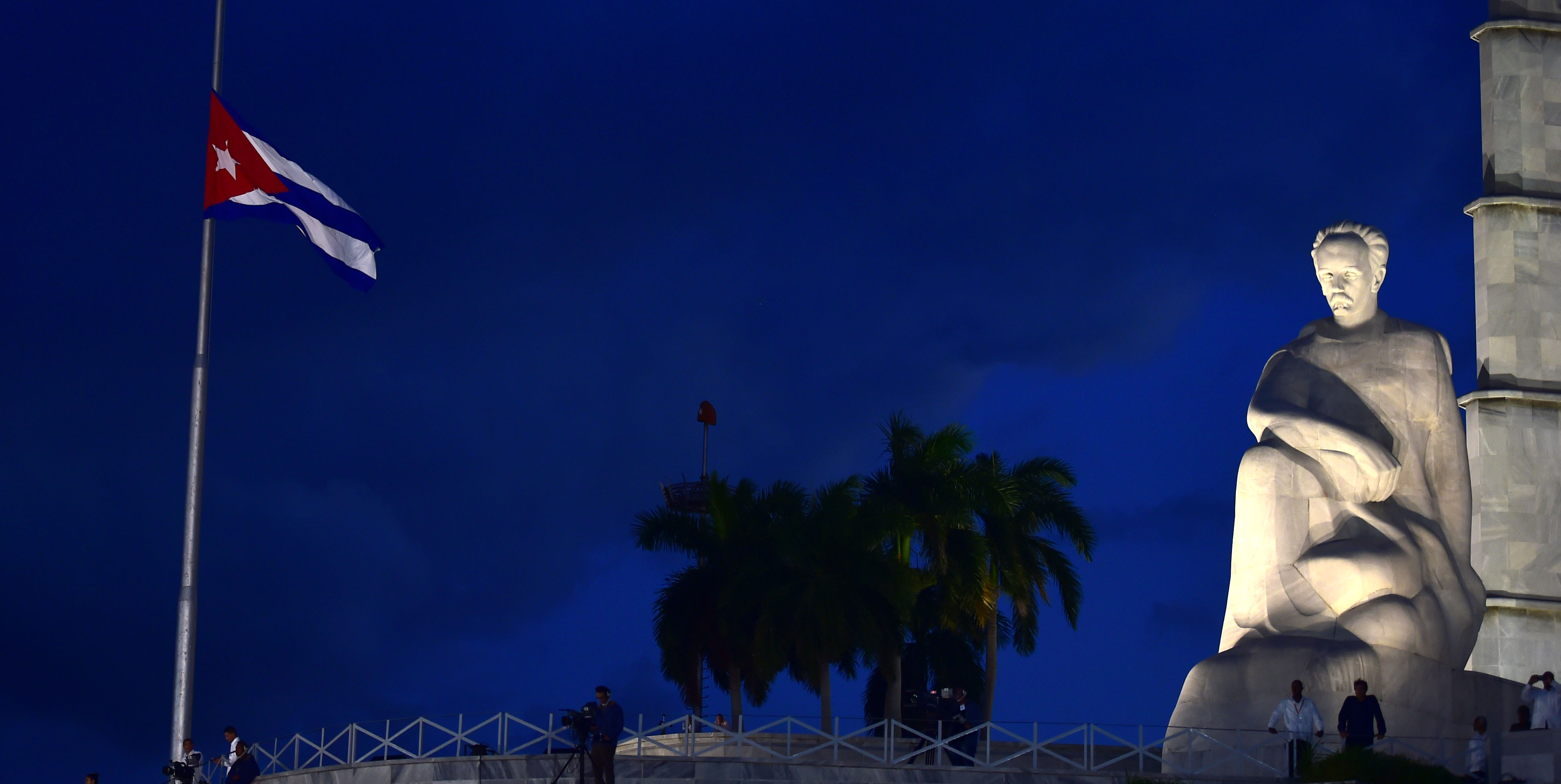
Cuban flag at half-mast for the state funeral of former leader Fidel Castro, 2016

In Cuba, flags were flown at half-mast in 2013 after the death of Venezuelan President Hugo Chávez, and again after the death of Fidel Castro in 2016.

In recent years, the flag of Cuba has also been flown at half-mast by proclamation of the president of Cuba following deaths of foreign leaders.

=== Denmark ===
The Danish flag (Dannebrog) is nationally flown at half-mast in Denmark as a sign of mourning (for instance, upon the death of a current or former monarch of Denmark or of any member of the Danish royal family). It is performed by raising the flag briefly to the top of the mast and lowering it approximately one-third of the length of the flagpole. This tradition dates back to 1743, when Christian VI ordered in the naval's ceremonial regulations that instead of using black flags with white crosses for mourning, they should use the flag at half-mast as a sign of mourning.

On 28 August 2026, all flags across Denmark were flown half staff to mourn the loss of King Harald V of Norway.

This applied also for Norway as both kingdoms were united by that time. Unlike other monarchies, the Sovereign can order the Danish Royal Standard to be flown at half-mast.

=== Finland ===
In Finland, the official term for flying a flag at half-mast is known as suruliputus (mourning by flag(ging)). It is performed by raising the flag briefly to the top of the mast and lowering it approximately one-third of the length of the flagpole, placing the lower hoist corner at half-mast. On wall-mounted and roof-top flagpoles the middle of the flag should fly at the middle of the flagpole. When removing the flag from half-mast, it is briefly hoisted to the finial before lowering.

Traditionally, private residences and apartment houses fly the national flag at half-mast on the day of the death of a resident, when the flag is displayed at half-mast until sunset or 21:00, whichever comes first. Flags are also flown at half-mast on the day of the burial, with the exception that the flag is to be hoisted to the finial after the inhumation takes place.

Flags are also to be flown at half-mast by government agencies and embassies across the world on the days of national mourning, and "the entire nation is asked to join in." Such days are the deaths of former or current Finnish presidents, as well as significant catastrophic events such as the aftermath of 2004 Indian Ocean earthquake and tsunami, 2011 Norway attacks and significant national events such as the 2004 Konginkangas bus disaster and school shootings of Jokela, Kauhajoki, and Viertola.

Historically, flags were flown at half-mast on the Commemoration Day of Fallen Soldiers which takes place on the third Sunday of May. Originally, flag was raised to the finial in the morning, displayed at half-mast from 10:00 to 14:00, and again raised to the finial for the rest of the day. In 1995, the 50th anniversary of the end of the Second World War, the tradition of flying the flag at half-mast was discontinued and flag is displayed at the finial in a usual manner.

=== France ===
The French flag is flown half mast on any day of mourning by order of the government (for example after the Charlie Hebdo attack on 7 January 2015, the Paris attacks on 13 November 2015, and the Nice attack on 14 July 2016). Other countries have also flown the French flag at half mast because of this too (e.g. Australia's Sydney Harbour Bridge flew the French flag at half mast following the Paris attacks in November 2015).

Some occurrences of the French flag being flown half mast have been controversial, especially after the death of Pope John Paul II in 2005 but also in a lesser measure at the time following the death of Joseph Stalin in March 1953.

=== Germany ===
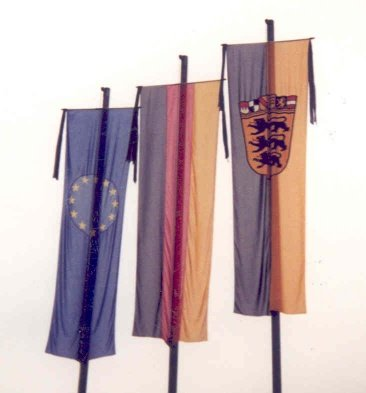
Black ribbons indicate mourning on banners that cannot be lowered to half-mast.

The flag of Germany and the flags of its federal states are flown at half-mast:

- On 27 January, Day of Remembrance for the Victims of National Socialism;
- On National Day of Mourning (33rd Sunday of Ordinary Time).
- On any day of mourning by order of the federal president for all of Germany, or by order of a minister president for a particular state. E.g. upon the death of a current or former ranking politician or person of high esteem, or multiple deaths in accidents or natural disasters.

If flags cannot be displayed at half-mast (e.g. vertical banner flags), they should bear black crepe streamers.

One other notable exception to the convention is the flag of unity, in front of the Reichstag building. As a national monument symbolising German Unity, it may only ever be flown at full, except in extreme circumstances of national mourning. Since it was first hoisted on 3 October 1990, the flag of unity had been lowered to half-mast on just four occasions:

- 11 September 2001, the day of the September 11 attacks
- 26 April 2002, the day of the Erfurt school massacre
- 13 November 2015, the day of the November 2015 Paris attacks
- 23 March 2016, the day of the 2016 Brussels bombings

=== Greece ===
According to Law 851/1978, the only day specified on which the Greek flag is flown at half-mast is Good Friday. Also, on other national and public mourning days.

=== Hong Kong ===
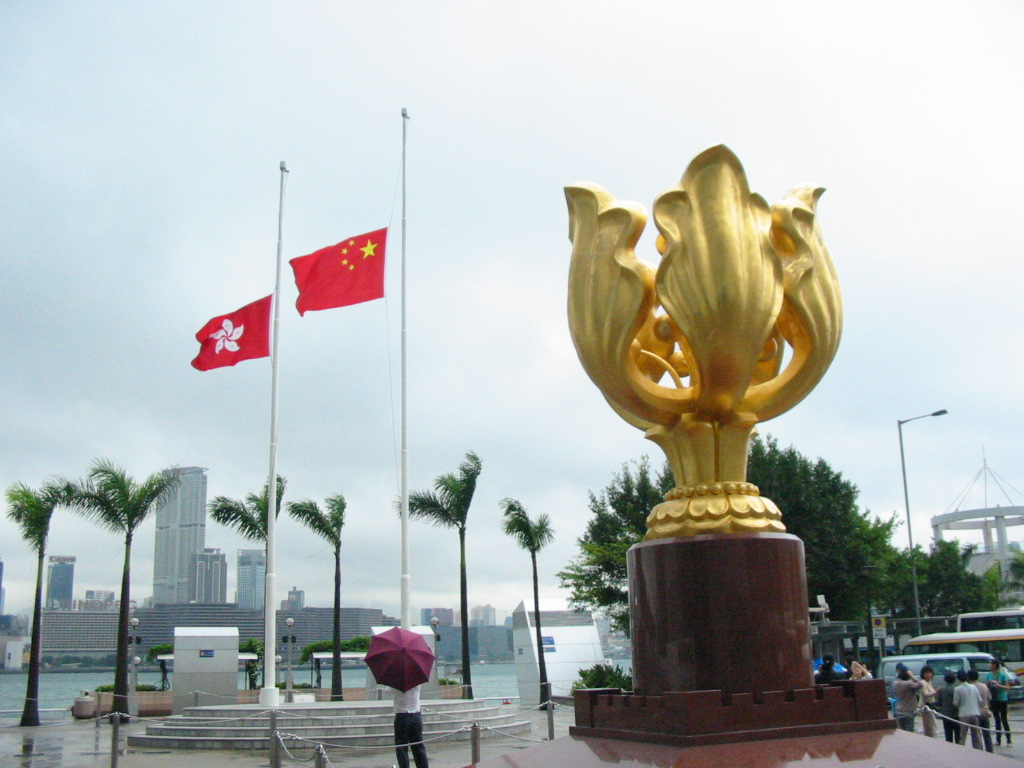
Hong Kong SAR flag flown at half mast

Similar rules as in China apply for Hong Kong. (See Flag of Hong Kong for details.) Prior to the transfer of sovereignty in 1997, the rules for flying the flag at half-mast were the same as the British ones.

- The HKSAR flag was flown at half-mast on 24–26 August 2010, for the fatalities of the Hong Thai Travel tourists in the 2010 Manila hostage crisis.
- The national flag of the PRC was also flown at half-mast on 26 August in Hong Kong.
- The HKSAR flag was flown at half-mast on 4–6 October 2012, for the Lamma Ferry Accident victims in which 39 people died.
- On 27 October 2023, the HKSAR flags across the region flown half mast to honour Chinese Premier Li Keqiang who passed away in Shanghai, China.
- On 26 November 2025, The national flag and the HKSAR flag was flown at half-mast on 29 November–1 December 2025, for the victims of the Wang Fuk Court fire.
- On 13 August 2026, all HKSAR flags across the region flown at half mast for the passing of former Chinese Premier Zhu Rongji on 12 August 2026.
- On 20 September 2026, all HKSAR flags across the region flown at half mast during the state funeral for first former Chief Executive Tung Chee Hwa on 8 September 2026.

=== India ===
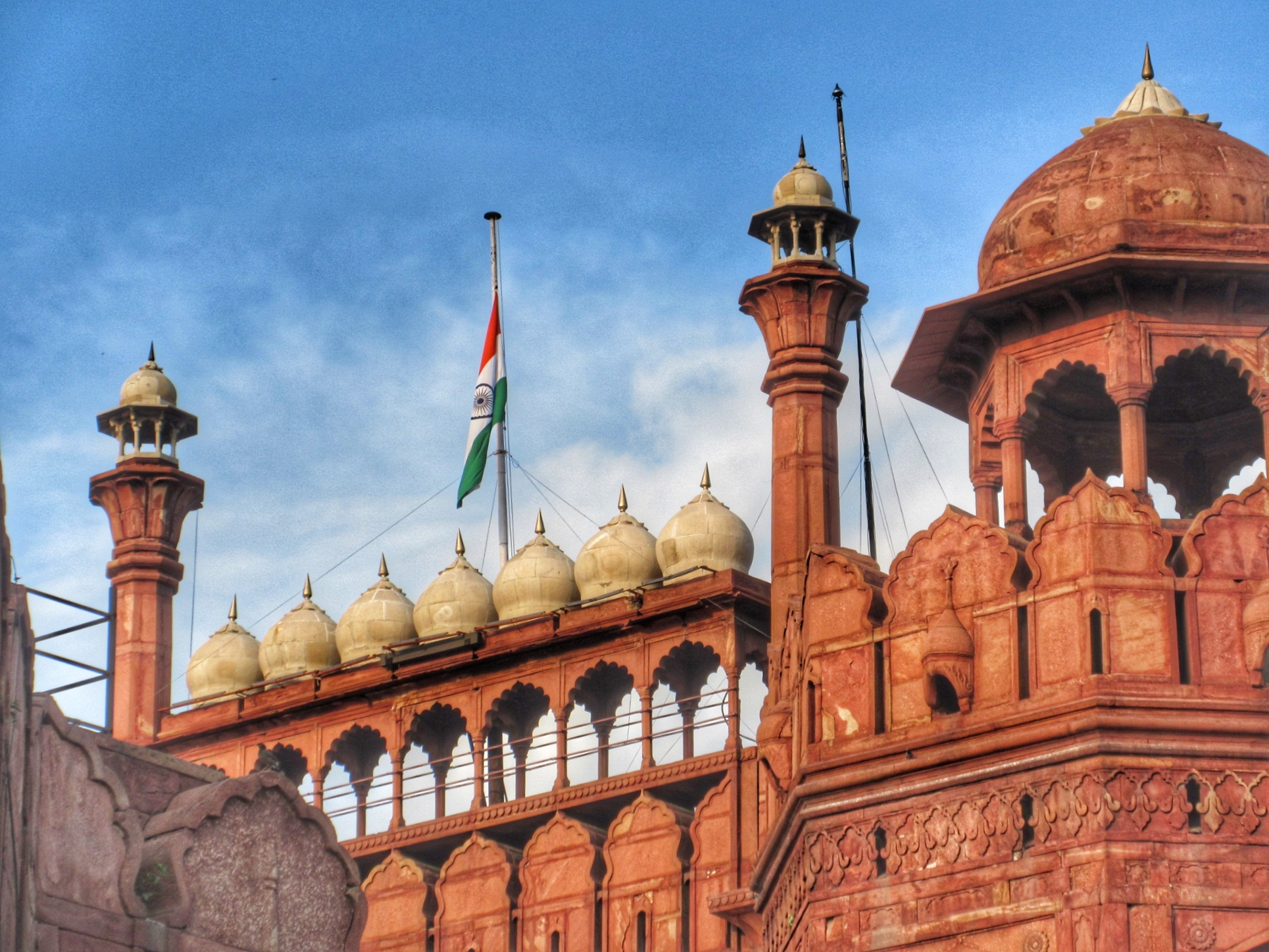
Indian flag flown at half-mast at the Red Fort

The flag of India is flown at half-mast for the death of a president, vice-president, or prime minister, all over India. For the speaker of the Lok Sabha and the chief justice of the Supreme Court of India, it is flown in Delhi and for a Union Cabinet minister it is flown in Delhi and the state capitals, from where the official came. For a minister of state, it is flown only in Delhi. For a governor, lieutenant governor, or chief minister of a state or union territory, it is flown in the concerned state.

If the intimation of the death of any dignitary is received in the afternoon, the flag shall be flown at half-mast on the following day also at the place or places indicated above, provided the funeral has not taken place before sunrise on that day. On the day of the funeral of a dignitary mentioned above, the flag shall be flown at half-mast at the place of the funeral. For example, on 17 March 2019, the government of India declared a national day of mourning on 18 March 2019 due to the death of the chief minister of Goa, Manohar Parrikar, on 17 March 2019. This means that on 18 March 2019, the Indian national flag must be at half-mast in the national capital, that is, New Delhi, and in the capital cities of all the 28 states and Union Territories.

In the event of a halfmast day coinciding with the Republic Day, Independence Day,National Week (6 to 13 April), any other particular day of national rejoicing as may be specified by the government of India, or, in the case of a state, on the anniversary of formation of that state, flags are not permitted to be flown at half-mast except over the building where the body of the deceased is lying until it has been removed and that flag shall be raised to the full-mast position after the body has been removed.

Observances of state mourning on the death of foreign dignitaries are governed by special instructions issued from the Ministry of Home Affairs (Home Ministry) in individual cases. However, in the event of death of either the head of the state or head of the government of a foreign country, the Indian mission accredited to that country may fly the national flag on the above-mentioned days. India observed a five-day period of national mourning on the death of Nelson Mandela in 2013. India also declared 29 March 2015 as a day of national mourning as a mark of respect to the former prime minister of Singapore, Lee Kuan Yew. In February 2022, India observed two days of national mourning in memory of playback singer Lata Mangeshkar, who died on 6 February 2022. After the assassination of former Japanese prime minister Shinzo Abe and the death of Queen Elizabeth II of the UK, the Union Government of India ordered one-day national mourning on 9 July 2022 and 11 September 2022, respectively. On 26 December 2024, the Union Government of India ordered flags to half mast to mourn ex prime minister, Manmohan Singh.

=== Indonesia ===
The flag of Indonesia is flown half-mast for:

1. Three days following the death of the president or vice president (in office or former) of Indonesia throughout the country and on official Indonesian installations abroad.
2. Two days following the death of the head of a state institution, minister or minister-level officials. Half mast is only flown limited to the location of the institution which the official is concerned.
3. One day following the death of a member of a state institution, regional head or the head of the regional people's representative council. Half mast is only flown limited to the location of the institution which the official is concerned.

The national flag of Indonesia may also be flown at half-mast on:

- 30 September, in remembrance of the 30 September Movement (after the fall of Suharto and the end of the New Order in 1998, this tradition was stopped, but has since resumed in recent years);
- 12 October, in remembrance of the victims of the 2002 Bali bombings;
- 26 December, in remembrance of victims of the 2004 Indian Ocean earthquake and tsunami;
- Three days after the death of President or former Presidents, Vice President or former Vice Presidents, Members of Cabinet, Speaker of People's Representative Council, and Head of Government;
- Other mourning days established by national or local governments.

=== Iran ===
The flag of Iran is flown at half-mast on the death of a national figure or mourning days.

On 10 January 2017, the flag was flown at half-mast following the death of Ayatollah Akbar Hashemi Rafsanjani, and again eleven days later following the Plasco Building collapse in Tehran. On 1 March 2026, the flag was flown at half-mast following the death of Iran's Supreme Leader Ayatollah Ali Khamenei, who was killed in joint Israeli and U.S. strikes.

=== Ireland ===
The flag of Ireland is flown at half-mast on the death of a national or international figure, including former and current presidents or Taoiseach, on all prominent government buildings equipped with a flag pole. The death of a prominent local figure can also be marked locally by the flag being flown at half-mast. When the national flag is flown at half mast, no other flag should be half-masted. When a balcony in Berkeley, California, collapsed, killing six Irish people, flags were flown at half mast above all state buildings.

In 2016, to commemorate the centenary of the Easter Rising, the Irish national flag over the General Post Office in Dublin was lowered to half mast. On Easter Monday 1916, as the rising began, Patrick Pearse stood outside the Post Office and read the Proclamation of the Irish Republic.

=== Israel ===
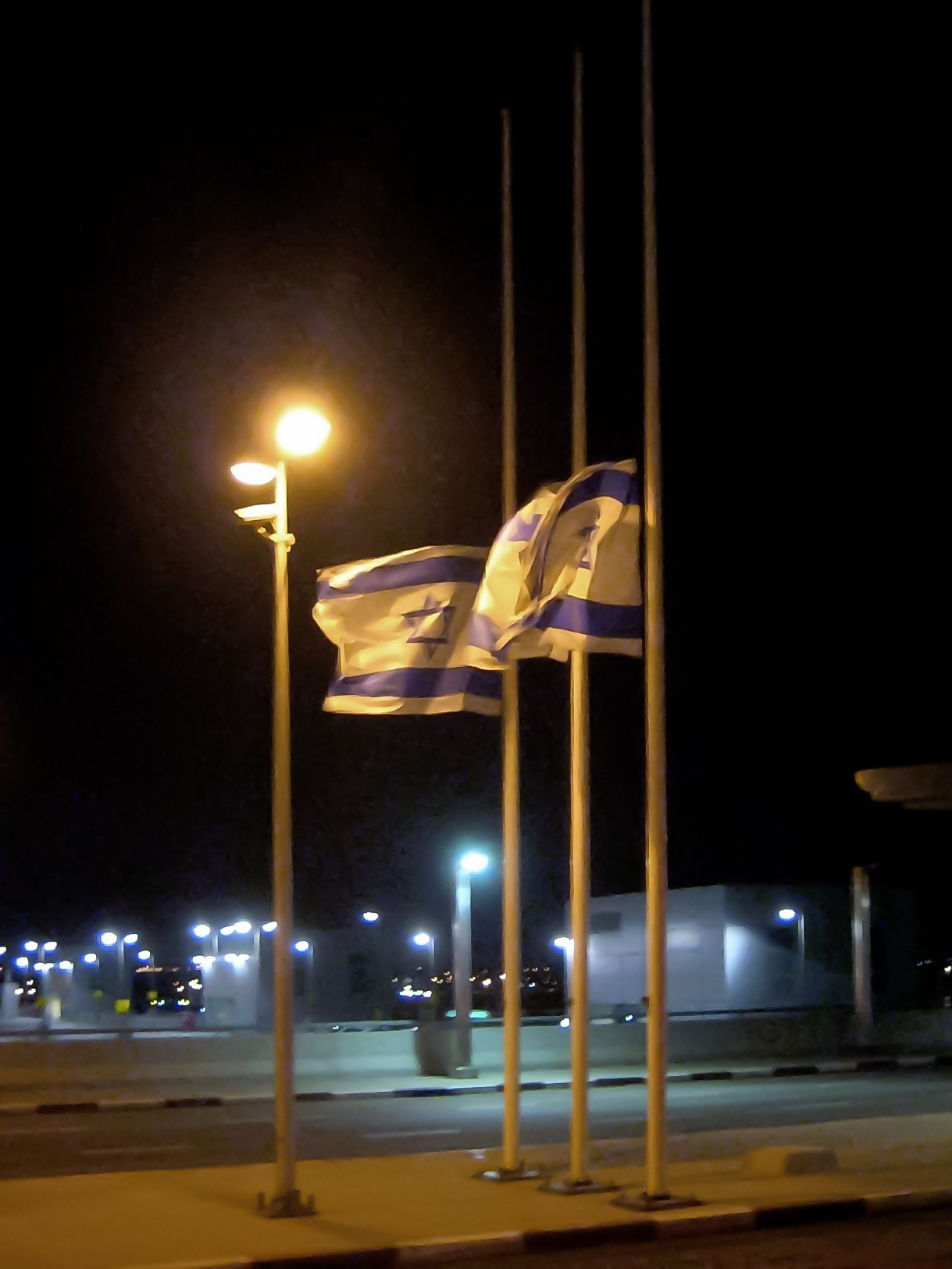
Flags in Israel at half mast on the eve of Yom HaShoah

The flag of Israel is flown at half-mast on Yom HaShoah (Holocaust Remembrance Day), Yom HaZikaron (Fallen Soldiers and Victims of Terrorism Remembrance Day), and other national days of mourning.

=== Italy ===
The flag of Italy was flown at half-mast after the 2013 Sardinia floods on 22 November 2013.

On 21 April 2025, the Italian & Vatican City flags were flown half mast due to passing of Pope Francis in his hometown in Domus Sanctae Marthae (Casa Santa Marta), Vatican City.

=== Jamaica ===
The flag of Jamaica is flown as a sign of official mourning when declared so by the Prime Minister.

For example, on 2 December 2016, the flag was flown half-mast in respect of the late former Cuban President Fidel Castro. Following the death of Venezuelan President Hugo Chávez, the flag was flown at half-mast. Following the death of Jamaica's head of state, Queen Elizabeth, the flag was flown half-mast.

=== Japan ===
The flag of Japan is flown at half-mast upon the death of the emperor of Japan, other members of the imperial family, or a current or former prime minister, and also following national disasters such as the 2011 Tōhoku earthquake and tsunami. In addition to the tradition of half-staff, the national flag may be flown topped by a black cloth to designate mourning. In 2022, the flag flew at half mast to mourn the loss of former prime minister Shinzo Abe after the assassination.

=== Malaysia ===
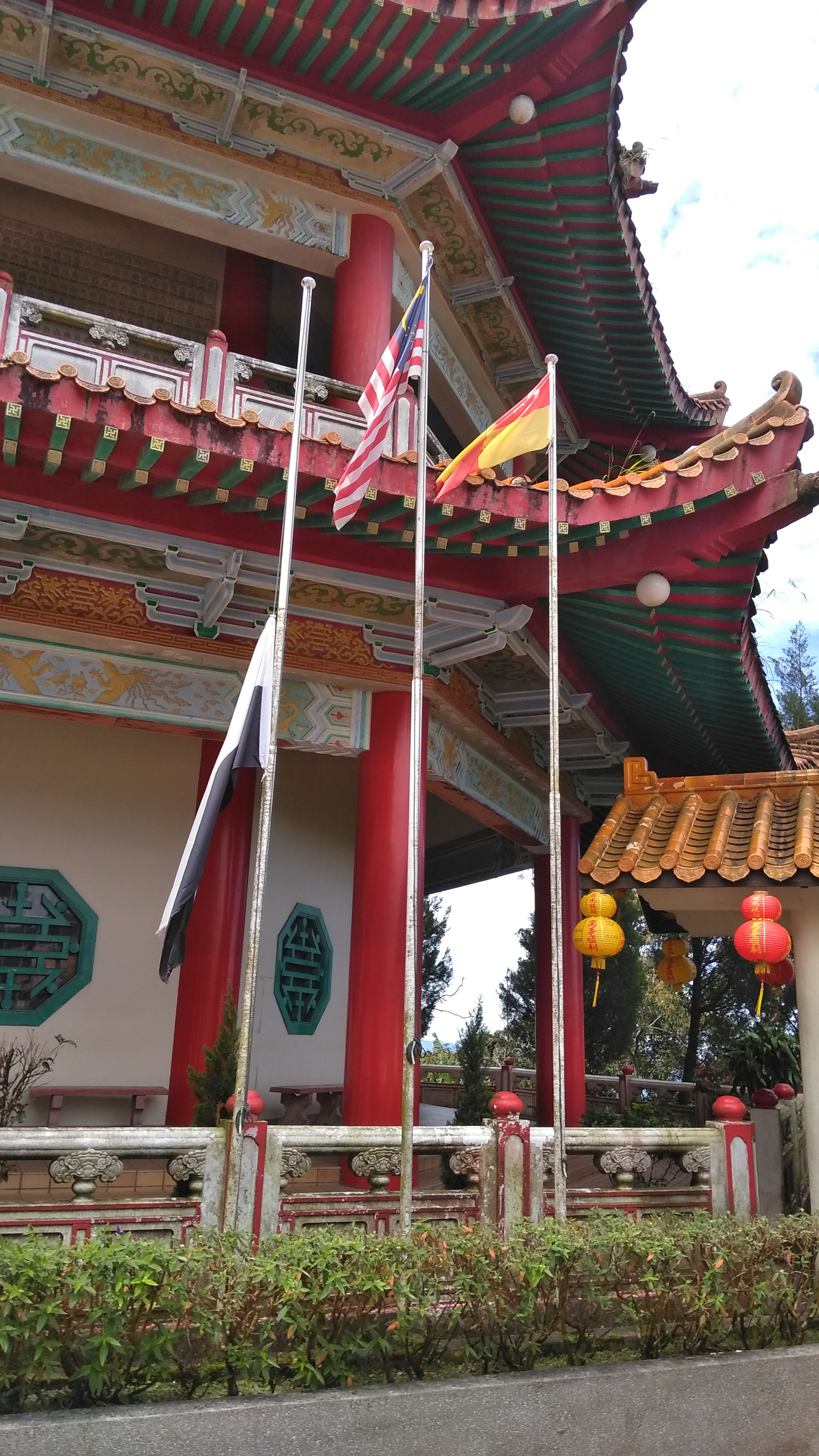
Flag of Pahang is flown at half-mast at the Chin Swee Caves Temple as a mark of respect to the late Sultan Haji Ahmad Shah Al-Musta'in Billah. The flag of Malaysia and Selangor are not at half-mast as a result of different mourning periods.

The flag of Malaysia (Malay: Jalur Gemilang) is flown at half-mast nationally:

- On the death of the Yang di-Pertuan Agong (King), for seven days from the day of announcement. All state and territorial flags are also flown at half-mast for seven days, while the national royal standard is flown at half-mast from the day of the announcement until the day of the election and inauguration of the new Yang di-Pertuan Agong;
- On the death of the Raja Permaisuri Agong (Queen), for seven days from the day of announcement. All state and territorial flags are also flown at half-mast for seven days;
- On the death of a state's ruler or governor, as well as the spouse of a ruler or governor, from the day of announcement until the day of the funeral. The state flag and state royal standard may be flown at half-mast for a longer period as determined by the state government;
- On the death of the prime minister or acting prime minister, for three days from the day of announcement; or
- When the Prime Minister's Department orders to flown the Malaysian flag at half-mast for some days.

On 8 March 2014, As a mark of respect to the passengers and crew who were on board Malaysia Airlines Flight MH370 and their family members, some states had their states flag flown at half-mast.

Similarly on 17 July 2014, As a mark of respect to the passengers and crew who were on board Malaysia Airlines Flight MH17 and their family members, the national flag was flown at half-mast for three days and also on the national day of mourning on 22 August 2014.

The 2015 Sabah earthquake had a mourning day and the flag half-mast on 8 June 2015.

On 8 September 2022, when Queen Elizabeth II passed away, the Selangor government ordered the Selangor flag to be flown half-mast from 17–19 September 2022.

=== Myanmar ===
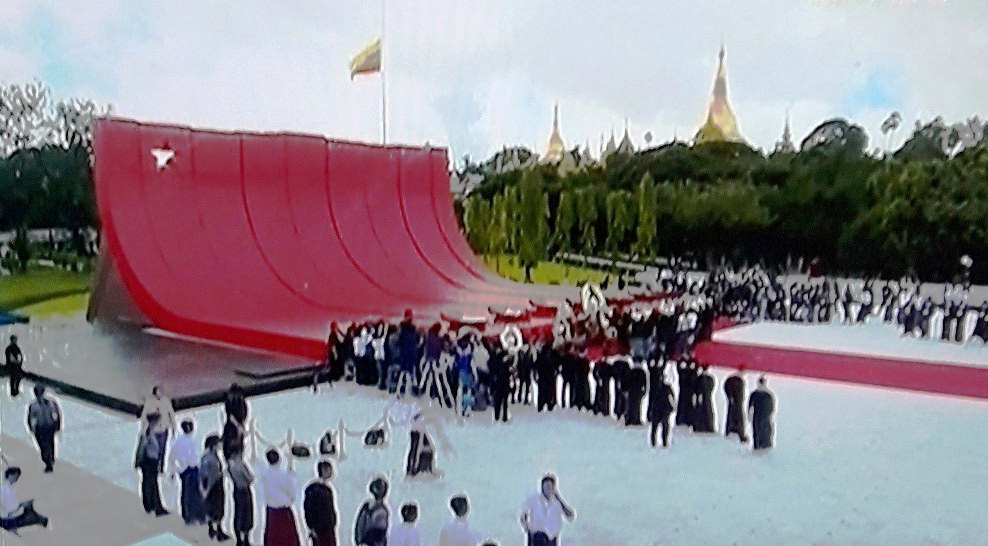
The Mausoleum (There are 7 tombs out of 9 tombs who are victims of the assassination inside it.)

The flag of Myanmar is ceremonially flown at half-mast at the Martyrs' Mausoleum, located in Yangon, every year on 19 July. This day is observed as Martyrs' Day, a significant national event that commemorates the assassination of Aung San, the revolutionary founding father of modern Myanmar and father of Aung San Suu Kyi, a Nobel Peace Prize winner, along with several of his key ministers and advisory commissioners in 1947.

The flag being flown at half-mast serves as a symbol of national mourning and respect for those who sacrificed their lives for the country's independence and sovereignty. Various ceremonies and tributes are held across the nation, emphasizing the importance of Aung San's legacy and the ongoing struggle for democracy and human rights in Myanmar.

On 28 March 2025, The 2025 Myanmar earthquake had a mourning day and the flag at half-mast on 31 March 2025.

=== Netherlands ===
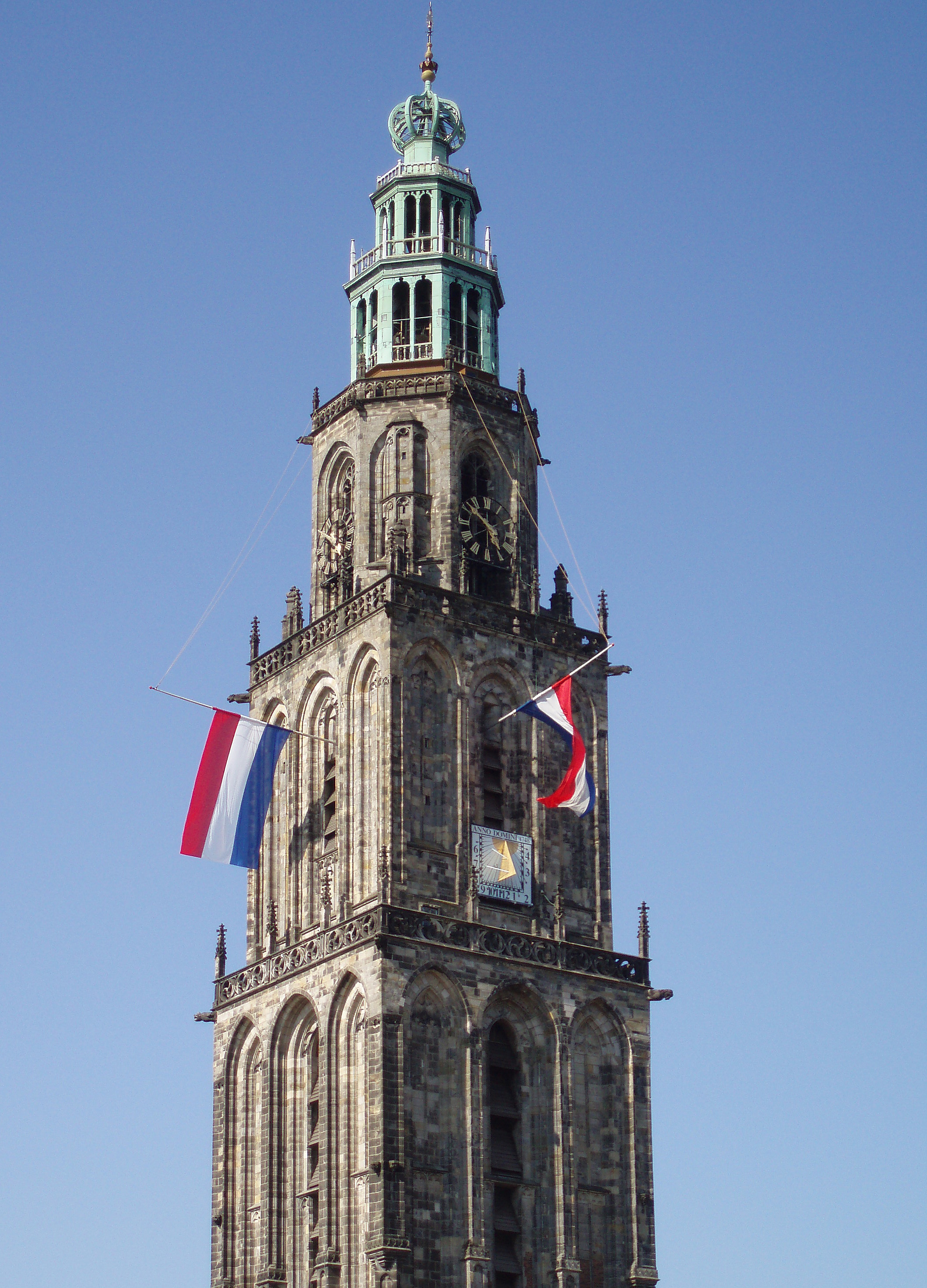
Two flags half-mast at the Martinitoren in Groningen, Netherlands

The flag of the Netherlands is nationally flown at half-mast:

- On remembrance day of the dead (4 May). After the formal two minutes of silence at 8 p.m., the flag used to be hoisted upon the playing of the national anthem. Since 2001, it is left at half-mast, even after the two minutes of silence;
- At the death of a member of the royal family;
- By instruction of the Dutch government through the office of the prime minister in special situations (e.g. the 2009 attack on the Dutch royal family on 30 April, Koninginnedag, which resulted in the deaths of seven bystanders, and after the crash of Malaysia Airlines Flight 17 in 2014, in which 193 Dutch citizens died).

The royal standard and other flags of the Dutch royal family are never flown at half-mast. Instead, a black pennon may be affixed to the flag in times of mourning.

=== New Zealand ===
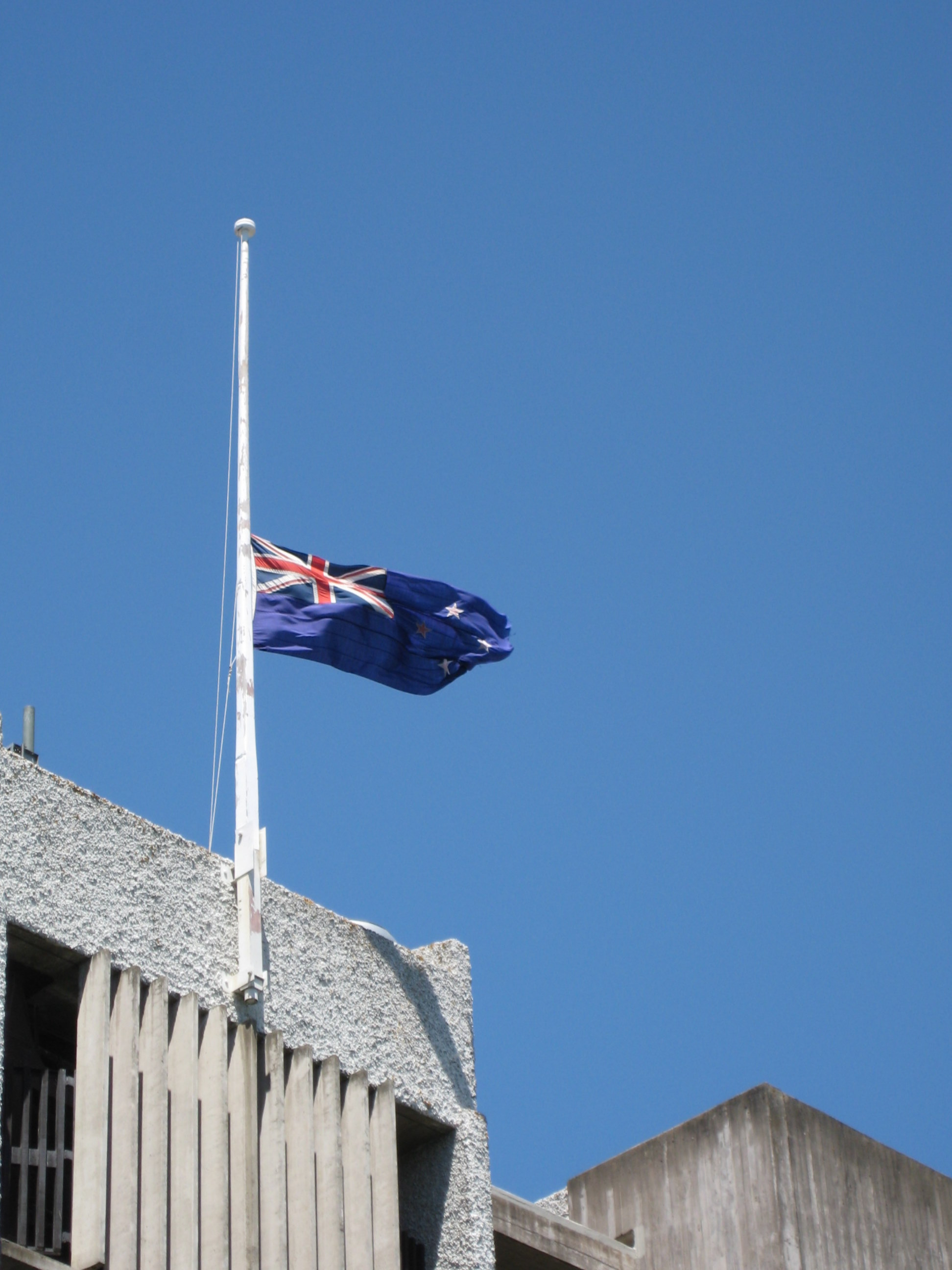
New Zealand flag at half-mast to mark the death of Sir Edmund Hillary

For both government and public buildings, the flag of New Zealand is flown at half-mast for the following people:

- The monarch of New Zealand from the day of the announcement of their death up to and including the day of the funeral (however, it is flown at full-mast on Proclamation Day, the day when the new sovereign is announced);
- Current and former governors-general and prime ministers of New Zealand on the day of the announcement of their death and the day of their funerals;
- Other members of the royal family on the day of their funeral subject to a special command from the monarch or governor-general;
- Commonwealth of Nations governors-general, Commonwealth prime ministers in office, foreign and Commonwealth heads of state on the day of the funeral;

In addition, it can also be flown at half-mast at the request of the minister for arts, culture and heritage. Examples of this are for the deaths of prominent New Zealanders (e.g. Sir Edmund Hillary; Māori monarchs Te Arikinui Dame Te Atairangikaahu and Kīngi Tūheitia), and for national tragedies (e.g. the Pike River Mine disaster).

According to the Ministry of Culture and Heritage, the position is always referred to as half-mast. The flag should be at least its own height from the top of the flagpole, though the actual position will depend on the size of the flag and the length of the flagpole.

=== Northern Cyprus ===
The flag of Northern Cyprus is routinely flown at half-mast throughout the country every 10 November in memory of Mustafa Kemal Atatürk, founding father of the Republic of Turkey who died on 10 November 1938. At other times, the premiership may issue an order for the flag to be flown at half-mast. Historical dates of half-mast in Northern Cyprus include:

- 7 November 2006, due to the death of Bülent Ecevit, prime minister of Turkey at the time of the Turkish Invasion of Cyprus;
- 14–20 January 2012, due to the death of Rauf Denktaş, founding president of Northern Cyprus;
- 15–16 May 2014 due to the Soma mine disaster;
- 22–24 July 2014 due to the 2014 Gaza War;
- 11–13 October 2015 due to the 2015 Ankara bombings;
- 29 June 2016 due to the 2016 Atatürk Airport attack;
- 11 December 2016 due to the December 2016 Istanbul bombings;
- 6–12 February 2023 due to the 2023 Turkey–Syria earthquakes;
- 19–21 October 2023 due to the Al-Ahli Arab Hospital explosion.
- 22 January 2025 due to the 2025 Kartalkaya hotel fire.

=== Norway ===
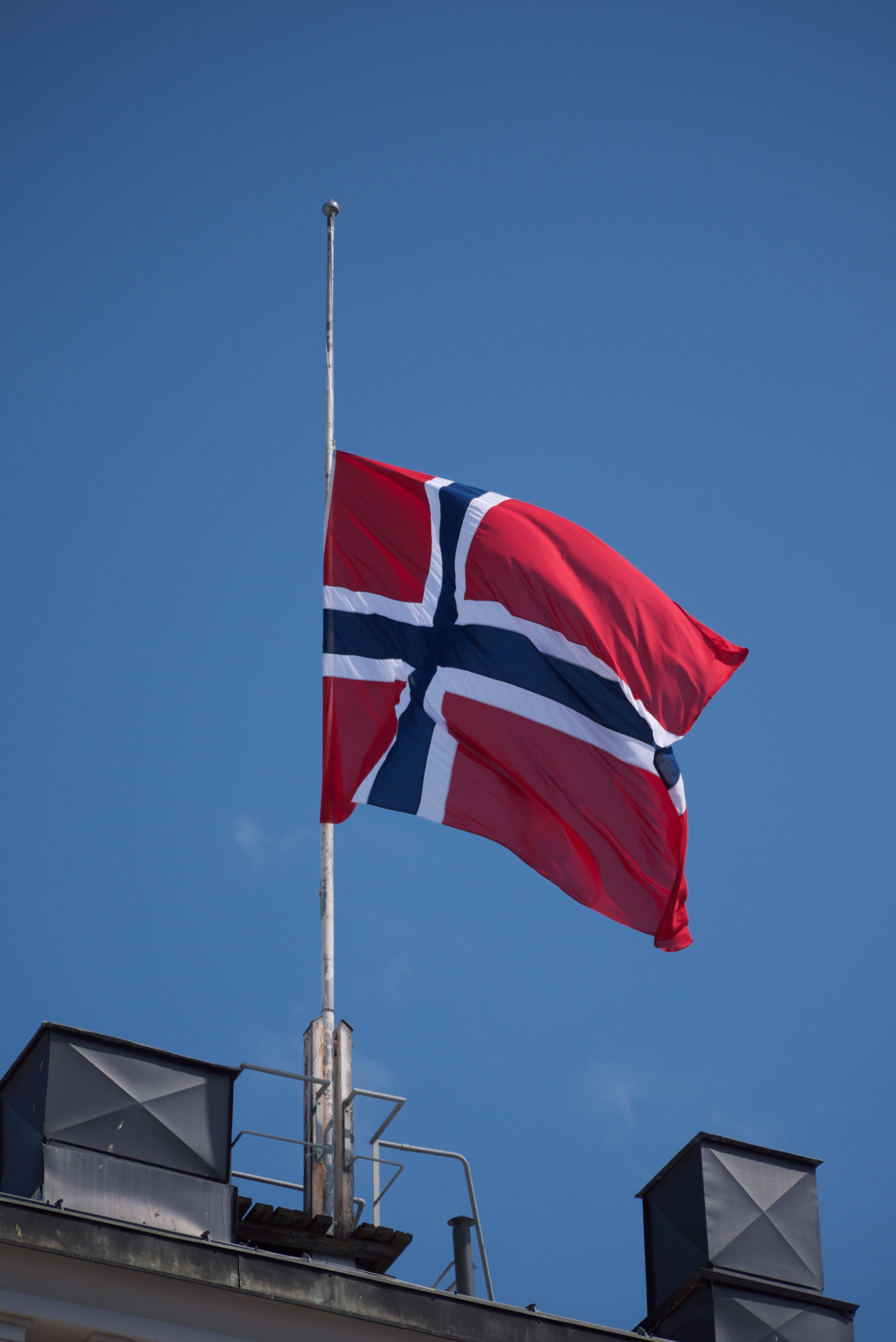
Norwegian flag at half-staff to mourn the victims of the 2011 Norway attacks

On days designated as official days of mourning the state flag is to be flown at half staff by state and government agencies. There are no permanent days of mourning and this provision only comes into use upon the death of a member of the Royal House or as designated by the Government. Upon the death of a member of the Royal House the flag is to be displayed at half staff each day from the announcement of death until the end of the burial. If the burial service of a non-royal person connected to an individual public institution occurs on a flag flying day the flag flown by that institution is lowered to half staff until the burial service is over. One such example of a designated official day of mourning was during the immediate aftermath of the 2011 Norway attacks, in which flags all around Norway were half-staffed as a symbol of mourning for the victims. In Aug 2026, all flags flown at half staff at all places including schools, government buildings, airports & border checkpoints to honour King Harald V after his death on 28 August 2026.

=== Pakistan ===
The flag of Pakistan is routinely flown at half-mast on following days:

- On 21 April, anniversary of the death of the National Poet, Allama Muhammad Iqbal (1938);
- On 11 September, anniversary of the death of the Father of the Nation Muhammad Ali Jinnah (1948);
- On 16 October, anniversary of the death of the first prime minister, Liaquat Ali Khan (1952).

Any other day notified by the government. For example, on the death of Saudi king King Fahd bin Abdul Aziz, the flag was flown at half-mast for seven days (the flag of Saudi Arabia was not at half-mast because the flag contains the Shahada). Upon the assassination of Benazir Bhutto, the flag was ordered to be flown at half-mast for three days. On the death of Syedna Mohammed Burhanuddin, the spiritual leader of the Dawoodi Bohra community, the flag was ordered by Sindh Chief Minister Qasim Ali Shah to be flown at half-mast for two days (17 and 18 January) to express solidarity with the bereaved community. In 2014, the prime minister, Nawaz Sharif, announced a three-day mourning period from 16 December, including flying the flag at half-mast nationwide and at all embassies and high commissions of Pakistan, for the attack on Army Public School in Peshawar.

On 2 September 2021, the prime minister of Pakistan, Imran Khan, ordered that the flag be flown at half mast to mourn the death of Kashmiri separatist leader Syed Ali Shah Geelani

=== Philippines ===
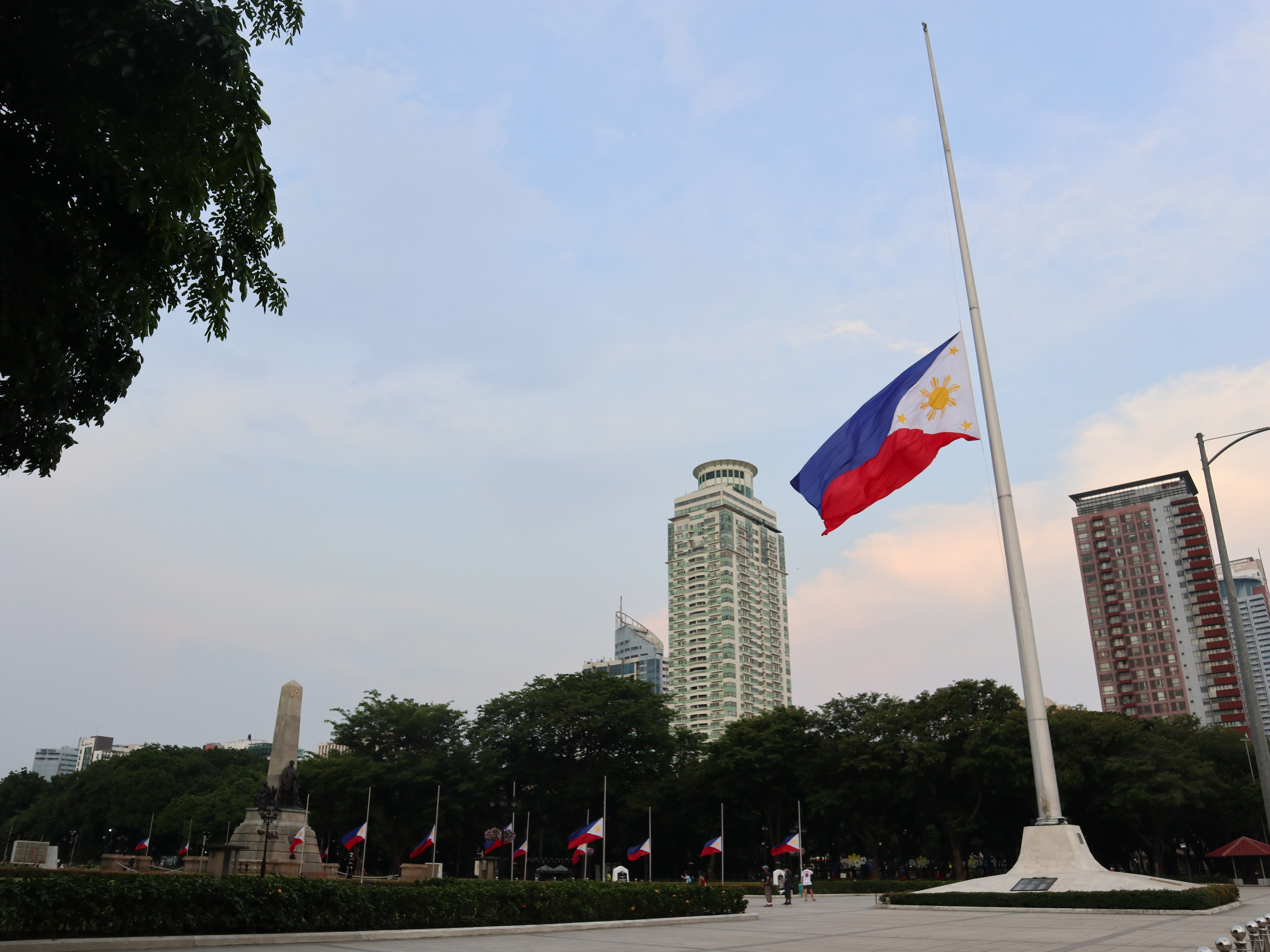
Philippine flag at half-staff at Rizal Park a few days after the death of former president Noynoy Aquino

The flag of the Philippines may be flown at half-mast as a sign of mourning. Upon the official announcement of the death of the president or a former president, the flag should be flown at half-mast for ten days. The flag should be flown at half-mast for seven days following the death of the vice president, the chief justice, the president of the Senate or the speaker of the House of Representatives.

As per Republic Act No. 229, flags nationwide are flown at half-mast every Rizal Day on 30 December to commemorate the death of national hero José Rizal.

When flown at half-mast, the flag should be first hoisted to the peak for a moment then lowered to the half-mast position. It should be raised to the peak again before it is lowered for the day.

The flag may also be used to cover the caskets of the dead of the military, veterans of previous wars, national artists, and outstanding civilians as determined by the local government. In such cases, the flag must be placed such that the white triangle is at the head and the blue portion covers the right side of the casket. The flag should not be lowered to the grave or allowed to touch the ground, but should be solemnly folded and handed to the heirs of the deceased.

Flags must also be raised to half-mast immediately in any area recovering from natural disasters such as a typhoon or an earthquake.

In the aftermath of the Mamasapano clash in which 44 members of the Special Action Force were killed, 30 January 2015, was declared a national day of mourning, and as such, all public institutions and military installations were instructed to lower the Philippine flag to half-mast.

On 24 June 2021, in several areas in the country, the flag of the Philippines was at half-mast as a sign of mourning for the 15th Philippine president, Benigno "Noynoy" Aquino III. Aquino's former communications secretary, Manolo Quezon, noted that some flags have been lowered to half-mast before his family confirmed the former president's death.

=== Poland ===
According to article 11 of the Coat of Arms Act, the flag of Poland may be flown at half-mast as a sign of national mourning declared by the president.

List of declared national mourning periods in Poland, as of 21 August 2021
No.	Date	Reason of declared national mourning	Ref.
Congress Poland
1	25–27 October 1826	Death of general Józef Zajączek	
Second Polish Republic
2	3 February 1924	Death of former president of the United States Thomas Woodrow Wilson	
3	18 June 1934	Assassination of minister Bronisław Pieracki	
4	12–18 May 1935	Death of marshal Józef Piłsudski	
5	4 December 1938	Death of archbishop Józef Teodorowicz	
Occupation of Poland (1939–1945)
6	7 July - 1 August 1943	Death of prime minister Władysław Sikorski	
7	4–18 October 1944	Fall of the Warsaw Uprising	
Polish People's Republic
8	9 March 1953	Death of Joseph Stalin	
9	13–16 March 1956	Death of General Secretary Bolesław Bierut	
10	8–11 July 1964	Death of first Chairman of the Council of State Aleksander Zawadzki	
11	16 February 1979	Explosion at PKO Bank Polski's Rotunda office in Warsaw	
12	28–31 May 1981	Death of primate of Poland Stefan Wyszyński	
Third Polish Republic
13	18 July 1997	1997 Central European flood	
14	12–14 September 2001	September 11 attacks	
15	12–13 March 2004	2004 Madrid train bombings	
16	5 January 2005	2004 Indian Ocean earthquake and tsunami	
17	3–8 April 2005	Death of Pope John Paul II	
18	14 July 2005	7 July 2005 London bombings	
19	29 January - 1 February 2006	Katowice Trade Hall roof collapse	
20	23–25 November 2006	2006 Halemba Coal Mine disaster	
21	23–25 July 2007	Accident of Polish bus on the Rampe de Laffrey	
22	24–26 January 2008	2008 Polish Air Force C-295 Mirosławiec crash	
23	14–16 April 2009	Kamień Pomorski homeless hostel fire	
24	21–22 September 2009	2009 Wujek-Śląsk mine blast	
25	10–18 April 2010	Smolensk air disaster	
26	5–6 March 2012	Szczekociny rail crash	
27	3 November 2013	Death of former prime minister Tadeusz Mazowiecki	
28	23 December 2018	Mine blast in Stonava	
29	18–19 January 2019	Assassination of mayor of Gdańsk Paweł Adamowicz	
30	15–16 February 2019	Death of former prime minister Jan Olszewski	

=== Russia ===
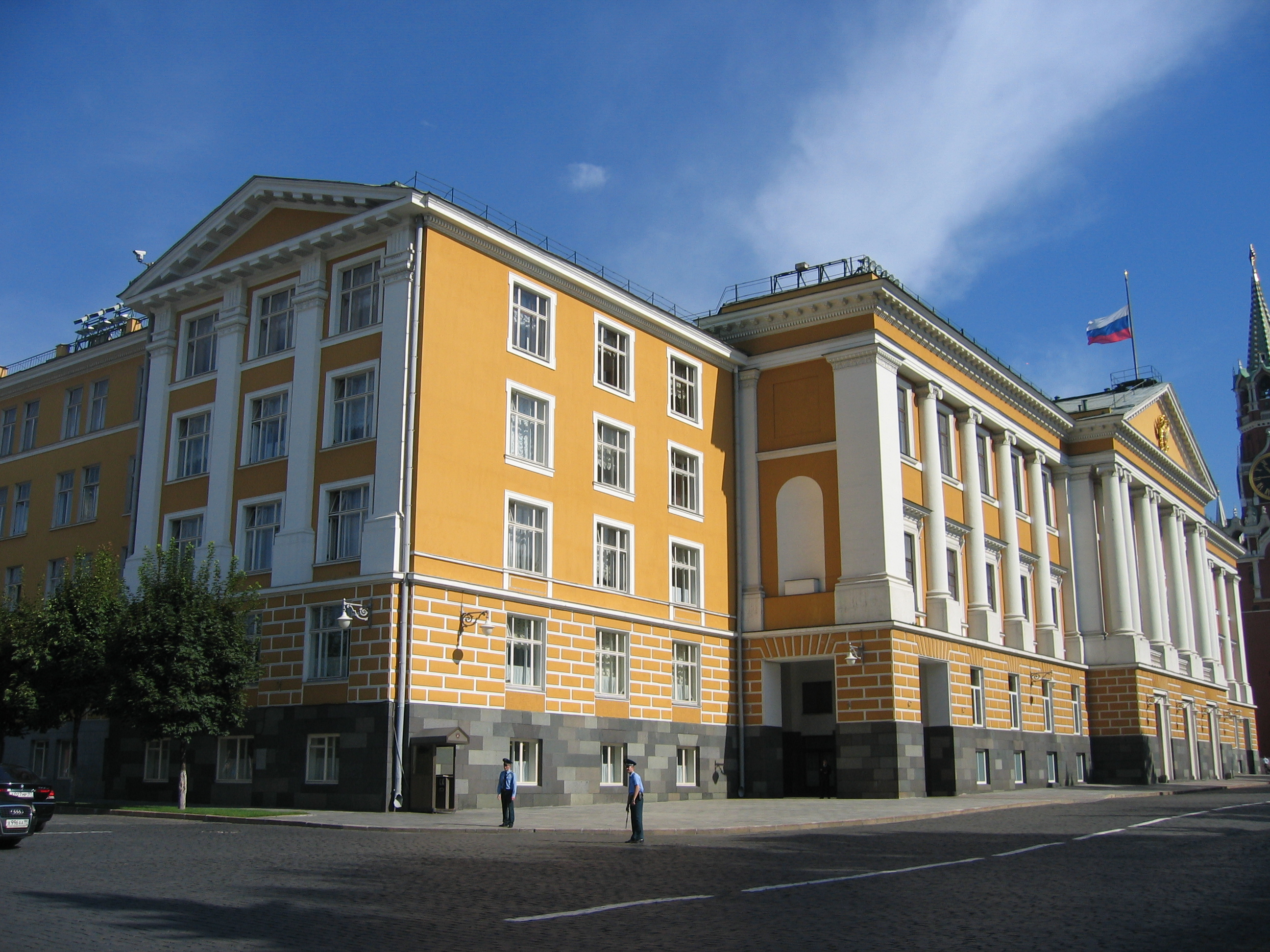
Kremlin administration building 14

The flag of Russia is flown at half-mast and (or) topped by black ribbon:

- On 22 June as a reminder of the Nazi invasion of the USSR in 1941;
- On the death of a current or former president of Russia;
- On disasters causing more than sixty deaths, nationwide upon presidential proclamation;
- On disasters causing more than 10 killed; in a suffering region upon proclamation of a governor;
- On other events which warrant mourning. For example, national mourning was proclaimed and all the state flags were flown at half-mast after the Smolensk air disaster despite the number of casualties being slightly fewer than 100. After the assassination of Andrei Karlov, the Russian ambassador in Turkey, in December 2016, the Russian flag was flown at half-mast across all Russian embassies.

All regional flags and departmental ensigns are flown at half-mast on national or regional mourning days alongside the national flag. Firms and non-governmental organizations, embassies and representatives of international organizations often join mourning. National or regional mourning usually lasts for one day.

=== Saudi Arabia ===
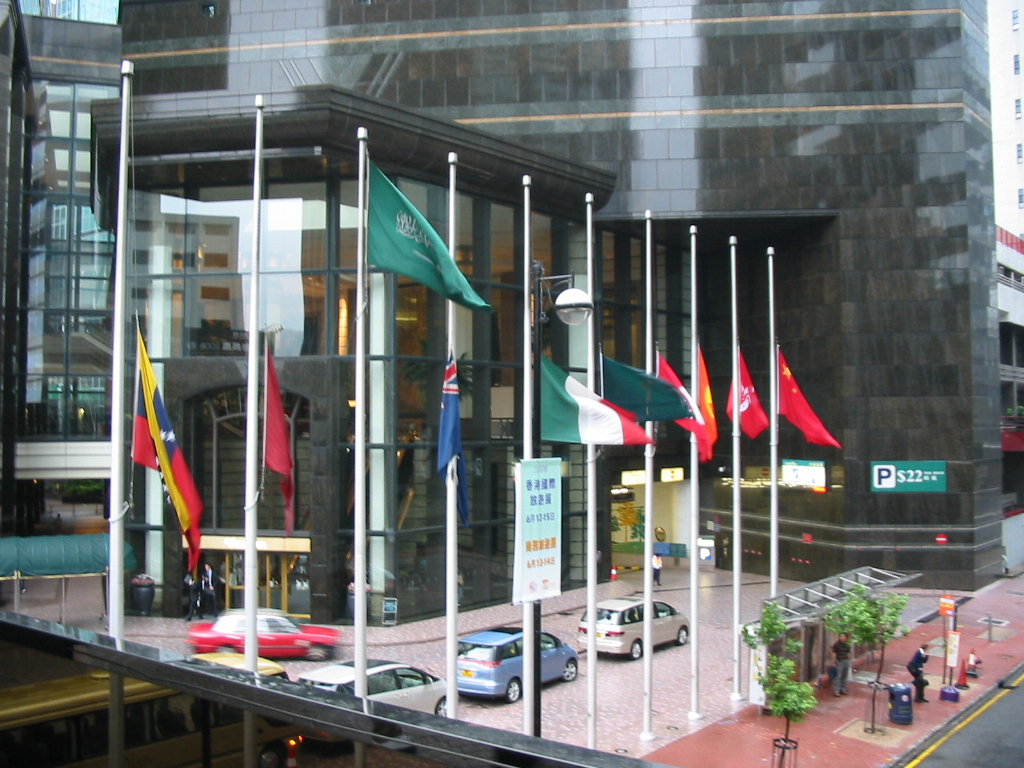
The flag of Saudi Arabia is never flown at half-mast.

The flag of Saudi Arabia is never flown at half-mast because it bears the Shahada. It is one of four such flags in the world which are not given this treatment, the other three being those of Afghanistan and Somaliland, which also display the Shahada, and Iraq, which bears the Takbir. Since all four bear the concept of the unique right of Allah to be worshipped alone, the flags are never lowered to half-mast even as a sign of mourning.

=== Singapore ===
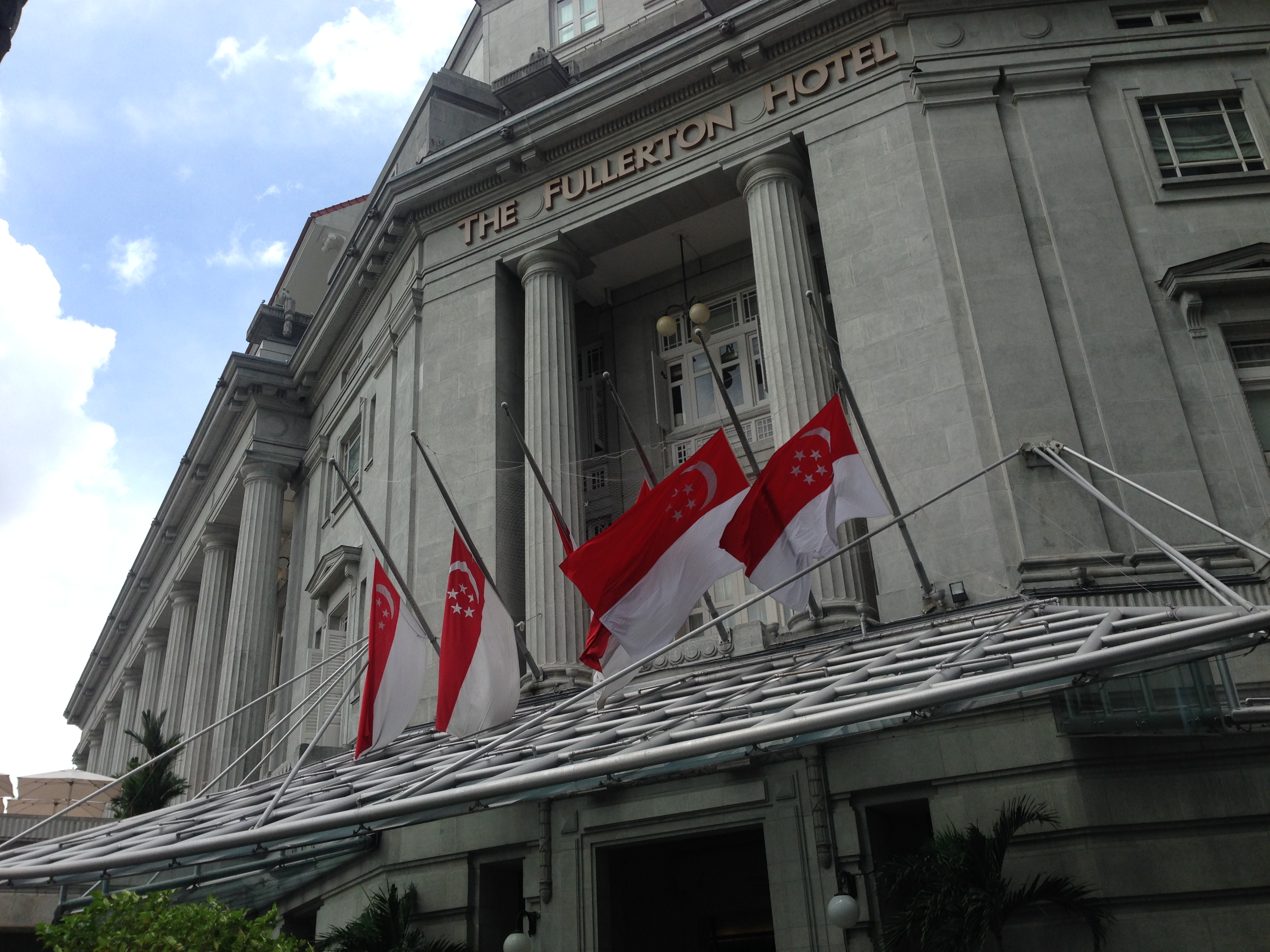
Flags of Singapore outside The Fullerton Hotel Singapore were flown at half-mast to mark the death of Lee Kuan Yew.

The flag of Singapore is flown at half-mast in Singapore following the deaths of an "important personage" (such as state leaders) and during periods of national mourning. Examples include:

- On the death of first President, Yusof Ishak, in 1970
- On the death of second President, Dr Benjamin Henry Sheares, in 1981
- On the death of the fifth president, Ong Teng Cheong, in February 2002;
- On the death of the fourth president, Wee Kim Wee, in 2005;
- On the death of the third president, Devan Nair, on 6 December 2005 who died in Ontario, Canada;
- On the death politician Lim Kim San, on 20 July 2006
- On the death of politician S Rajaratnam, on 22 February 2006
- On the death of former deputy prime minister Goh Keng Swee, who had a state funeral on 23 May 2010;
- On the death of former deputy prime minister Toh Chin Chye, who was cremated on 7 February 2012;
- On the death of the first prime minister and only Minister Mentor, Lee Kuan Yew, who died on 23 March 2015;
- On the death of seven pupils, one teacher and a guide from Tanjong Katong Primary School due to 2015 Sabah earthquake;
- On the death of the sixth President, S. R. Nathan, who died on 22 August 2016;
- On the death of former Cabinet minister Othman Wok, who died on 17 April 2017;
- On the death of former Cabinet minister Jek Yeun Thong, who died on 3 June 2018, state flags at all government buildings were flown at half-mast on 7 June 2018;
- On the death of former head of state, Queen Elizabeth II, who died on 8 September 2022, state flags at all government buildings were flown at half-mast on 19 September 2022;

=== South Africa ===
The flag of South Africa is flown at half-mast as a sign of mourning when ordered by the president of South Africa. Upon the official announcement of the death of the current or former president, the flag should be flown at half-mast for ten days. The flag should be flown at half-mast for seven days following the death of the deputy president, the chairperson of the National Council of Provinces, the speaker of the National Assembly or the chief justice. For example, the flag was flown at half-mast from 6 to 15 December 2013 during the national mourning period for Nelson Mandela.

The flag was flown at half-mast during the week of national mourning following the Marikana massacre in August 2012.

=== South Korea ===
The flag of South Korea (Taegeukgi) is flown at half-mast on Hyeonchungil (Korean Memorial Day) and on days a state funeral is held.

In 2022, the Taegeukgi was half-masted to mourn the victims of the Seoul Halloween crowd crush.

In 2024, it was half-masted after the fatal crash of Jeju Air Flight 2216, which killed 179 people.

=== Sri Lanka ===
The flag of Sri Lanka is nationally flown at half-mast on a national day of mourning.

=== Sweden ===
The flag of Sweden is nationally flown at half-mast in Sweden. Examples include:

- On the death of a current or former king of Sweden.
- On the death of any member of the royal family.

Other historical examples of the flag being flown at half-mast include:

- 18 July 1931, due to the death and funeral of Archbishop Nathan Söderblom
- 19 September 1961, due to the death of UN Secretary-General Dag Hammarskjöld
- 15 March 1986, due to the assassination and funeral of Prime Minister Olof Palme
- 1994, due to the sinking of the MS Estonia
- 1998, due to the Gothenburg discothèque fire
- 14 September 2001, due to the September 11 attacks
- 19 September 2003, due to the assassination and funeral of Minister for Foreign Affairs Anna Lindh
- 1 January 2005, due to the 2004 Indian Ocean earthquake and tsunami
- 11 February 2025, due to the 2025 Risbergska school shooting
- 28 August 2026, due to the mourning of King Harald V of Norway.

=== Taiwan ===
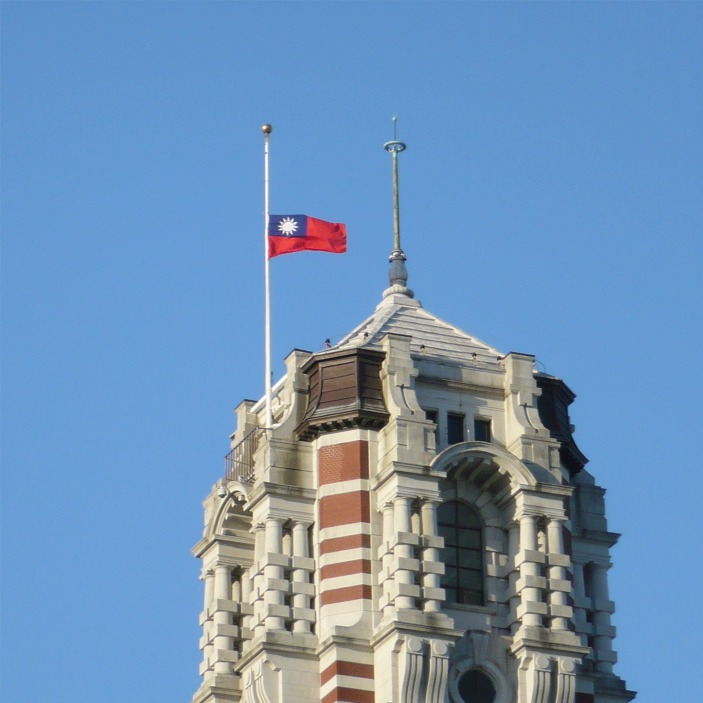
ROC (Taiwan) national flag flown half mast at the Presidential Office Building

In Taiwan, the flag of Taiwan was flown at half-mast on June 14th in 1989 in memory of those who died during the 1989 Tiananmen Square protests and massacre along with other forms of mourning, including bells.

The flag of the Republic of China is flown at half-mast on 28 February to mark the anniversary of the 28 February incident. On 5 August 2014, Taiwan flew their flag in half-mast for three days to commemorate the victims of the Kaohsiung gas explosions and TransAsia Airways Flight 222 crash.

The flag of Taiwan was flown at half-mast on July 11th, 2022 to mourn and honor former Prime Minister of Japan, Shinzo Abe, who was fatally shot on July 8th.

"In lowering the flag to half-mast, the national flag shall first be raised to the top of the pole and then lowered to the position equivalent to 1/2 of the length of the pole. When removing the flag, the flag shall first be raised to the top of the pole again and then lowered."
--Article 14, National Emblem and National Flag of the Republic of China Act

According to the National Emblem and National Flag of the Republic of China Act, all flags of Taiwan are to be lowered should an order be ruled out, even if it's on naval vessels or overseas embassies.

=== Thailand ===
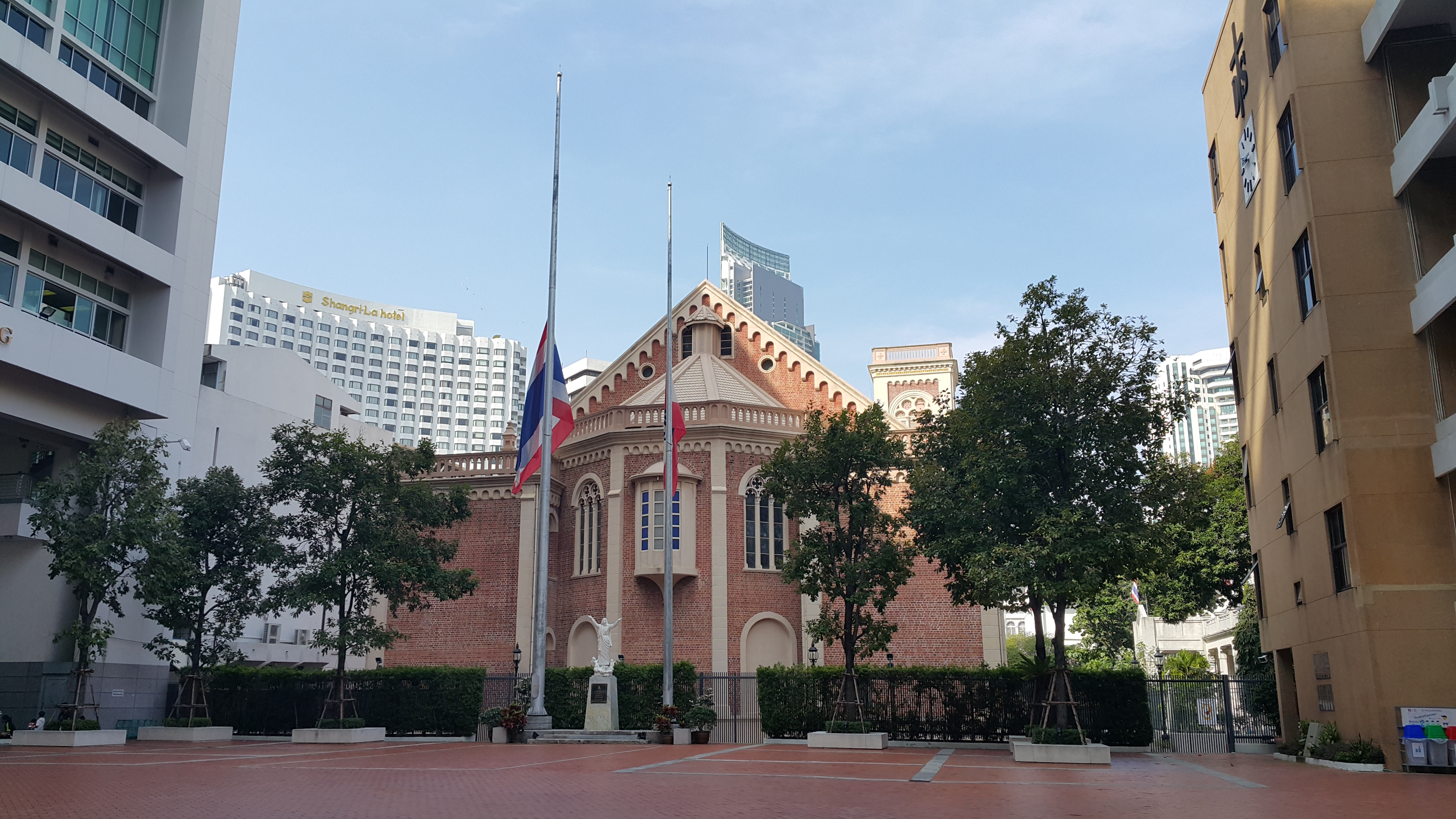
Flag of Thailand at half-mast at Assumption College (Thailand), Bangkok, during the mourning of the King Bhumibol

The flag of Thailand was flown at half-mast for 15 days to mourn for the victims of 2004 Indian Ocean earthquake and tsunami.

The flag of Thailand was flown at half-mast from 2 to 15 January 2008 on the death of Princess Galyani Vadhana, the Princess of Naradhiwas.

The flag of Thailand was flown at half-mast for 30 days; from 14 October to 13 November 2016 following the death of King Bhumibol Adulyadej (Rama IX).

The flag of Thailand was flown at half-mast for 30 days; from 25 October to 24 November 2025 following the death of Queen Sirikit.

The flag of Thailand was flown at half-mast for 15 days to mourn on the death of Princess Bajrakitiyabha, the Princess Rajasarini Siribajra.

=== Turkey ===
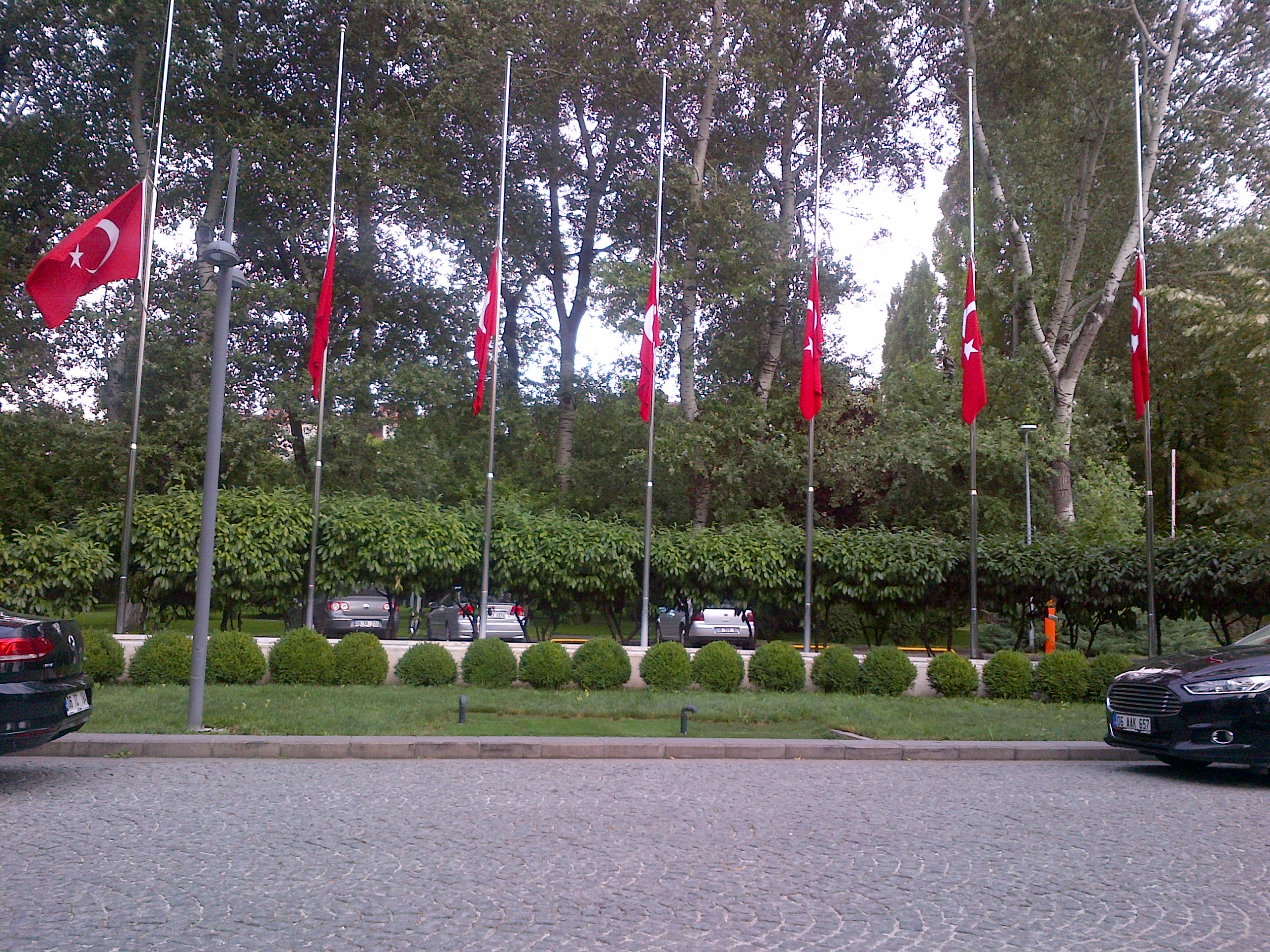
Turkish flags at half mast after the 2016 Atatürk Airport attack

The flag of Turkey is flown at half-mast throughout Turkey every 10 November, between 09:05 and the sunset, in memory of Mustafa Kemal Atatürk, who died on 10 November 1938 at five past nine in the morning. At other times, the government may issue an order for the national flag to be flown at half-mast upon the death of principal figures of the Turkish political life as a mark of respect to their memory (such as Turgut Özal). When such an order is issued, all government buildings, offices, public schools and military bases are to fly their flags at half-mast.

To show the sympathy of Turkish people to a foreign leader, such as after the deaths of Yasser Arafat or Pope John Paul II, flags are also flown at half-mast by governmental order. The flag at the Grand National Assembly in Ankara is never lowered to half-mast, regardless of the occasion. The flag at Anıtkabir, the mausoleum of Mustafa Kemal Atatürk, the founder of Turkey, is only lowered to half-mast on 10 November. At those times when the flag is to be flown at half-mast, it must first be raised to full height, then lowered to half-mast.

=== United Arab Emirates ===
The flag of the United Arab Emirates is flown at half mast on 30 November (Martyrs' Day) of every year from 08:00 to 11:30. The flag is also flown at half mast by decree of the president of the United Arab Emirates usually for three days. Each of the seven emirs has the right to order flags to be flown at half mast in his emirate.

=== United Kingdom ===
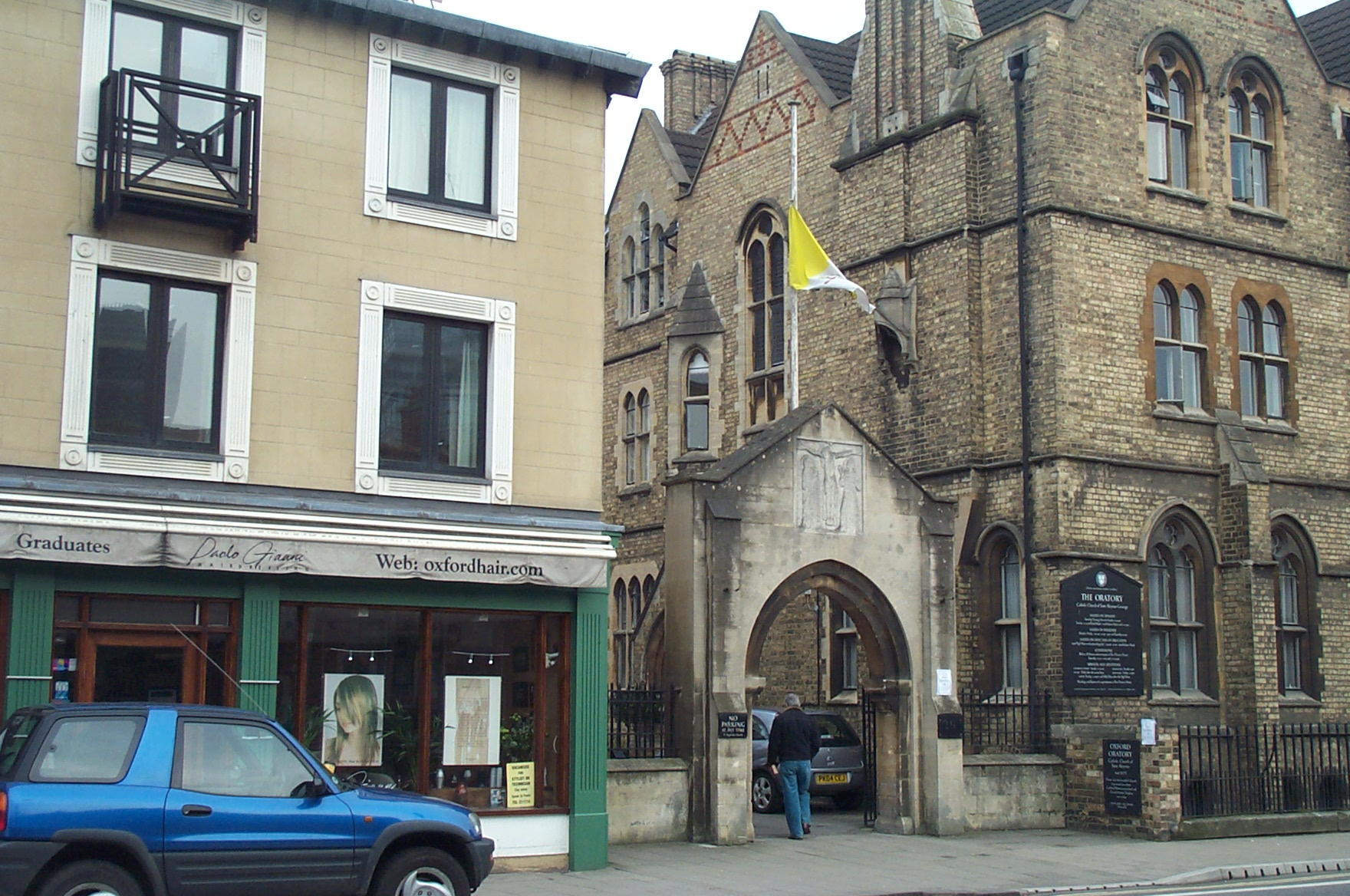
Oratory Church of St Aloysius Gonzaga, Oxford, with the flag of the Holy See flying at half-mast the day after the death of Pope John Paul II

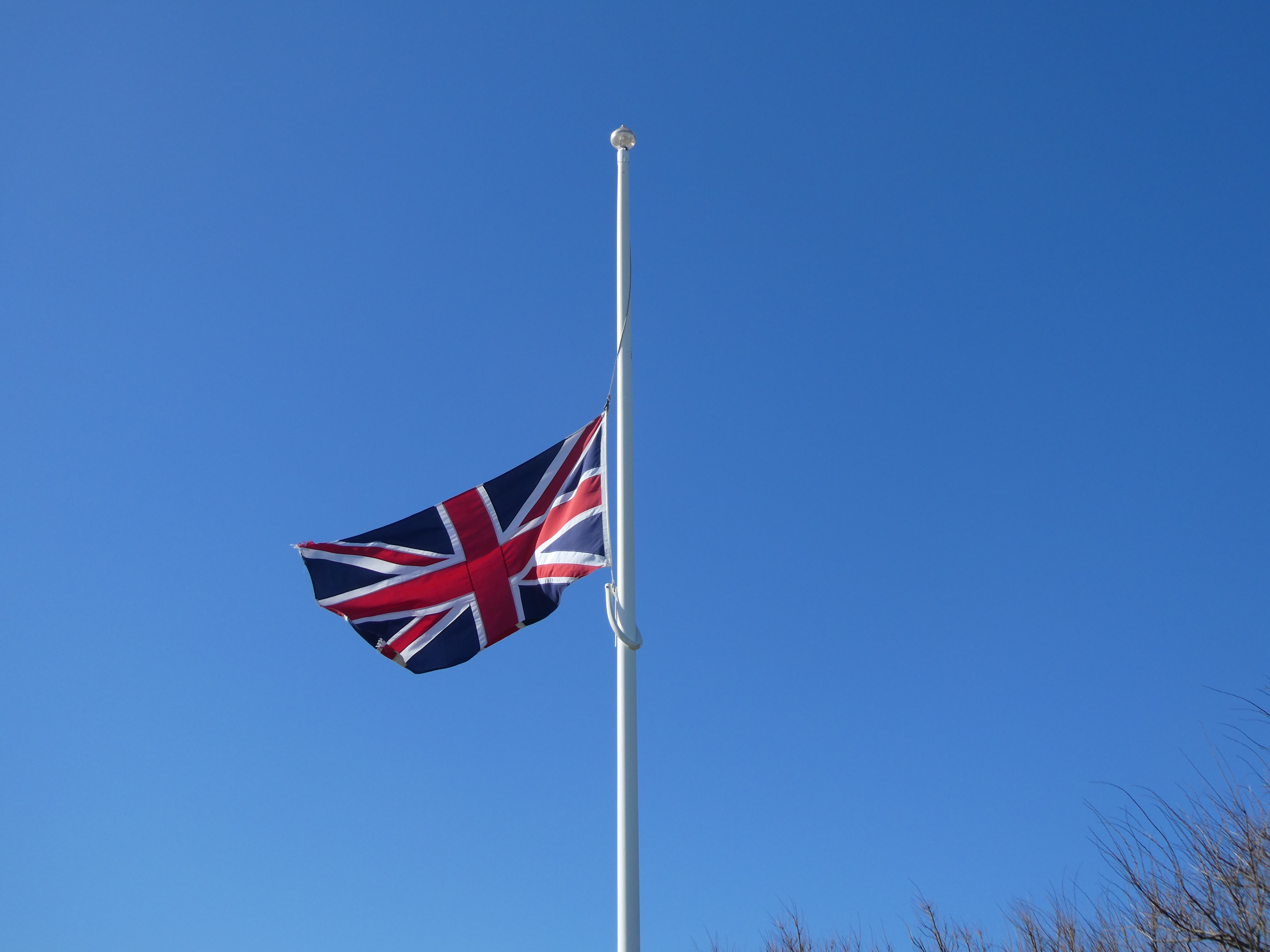
The Union Flag flying at half-mast, following the death of Prince Philip, Duke of Edinburgh, 2021

The Royal Standard, the flag of the British monarch, is never flown at half-mast, because there is always a sovereign on the throne. It flew at half-mast for several hours from the death of Edward VII until George V discovered the error.

There was some controversy in the United Kingdom in 1997 following the death of Diana, Princess of Wales, over the fact that no flag was flown at half-mast at Buckingham Palace. Customarily the only flag to fly from Buckingham Palace had been the Royal Standard when the sovereign was in residence at the palace; otherwise, no flag would fly. In response to public outcry, Queen Elizabeth II ordered a break with protocol, replacing the Royal Standard with the Union Flag at half mast as soon as she left the palace to attend the princess's funeral at Westminster Abbey. The Royal Standard was again flown (at full hoist) on her return to the palace. Since then, the Union Flag flies from the palace when the monarch is not in residence, and has flown at half mast upon the deaths of members of the royal family, such as Princess Margaret and the Queen Mother in 2002, Prince Philip in 2021 and Queen Elizabeth II in 2022, and at other times of national mourning such as following the terrorist bombings in London on 7 July 2005, and upon the death of the former prime minister Margaret Thatcher in 2013.

In the United Kingdom, the correct way to fly the flag at half-mast is two-thirds between the bottom and top of the flagstaff, with at least the width of the flag between the top of the flag and the top of the pole according to the Department of Culture, Media and Sport, which decides the flying, on command of the sovereign. The flag may be flown on a government building at half-mast on the following days:

- From the announcement of the death up to the funeral of the sovereign, except on Proclamation Day when flags are hoisted to full-mast, from 11 am until sunset;
- The funerals of members of the royal family, upon command of the sovereign;
- The funerals of foreign rulers, upon command of the sovereign;
- The funerals of prime ministers and ex-prime ministers of the UK, upon command of the sovereign;
- Other occasions, by special command of the sovereign.

On a wall-mounted flagpole that is angled at 45° or more from vertical, flags should not be flown at half mast; a flag should either be removed entirely or a black ribbon, known as a mourning cravat, should be attached to the top of the flag.

According to the Department of Culture, Media and Sport, the correct term is half mast.

If a flag-flying day coincides with a day of half-mast flying (including that for the death of a member of the royal family), the flag is flown at full-mast unless a specific command is received from the sovereign.

If more than one flag is flown on a half-mast day, they must all be flown at half-mast, or not flown at all. The flag of a foreign nation must never be flown at half-mast on UK soil unless that country has declared mourning.

On 8 September 2022, Queen Elizabeth II died at the age of 96 while at Balmoral Castle in Scotland. In accordance with the protocol implemented after the death of Diana, Princess of Wales, the Union Flag at Buckingham Palace was lowered to half mast.

=== United Nations ===
At the United Nations offices in New York and Geneva, the flag of the United Nations flies at half-mast on the day after the death of a head of state or a head of government of a member state, but generally not during the funeral. Other occasions are at the secretary-general's discretion. Other offices may follow local practice. To honor the memory of Dag Hammarskjöld the UN issued postage stamps showing its flag at half-mast.

=== United States ===
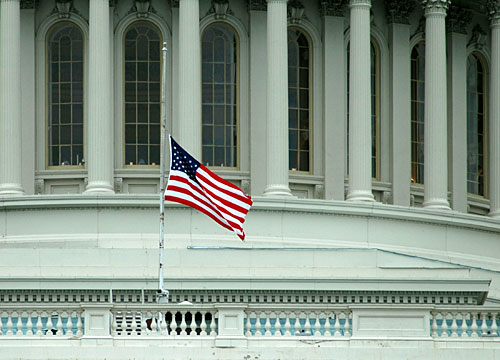
The flag at the Capitol Building flies at half-staff in honor of President Ronald Reagan, 2004.

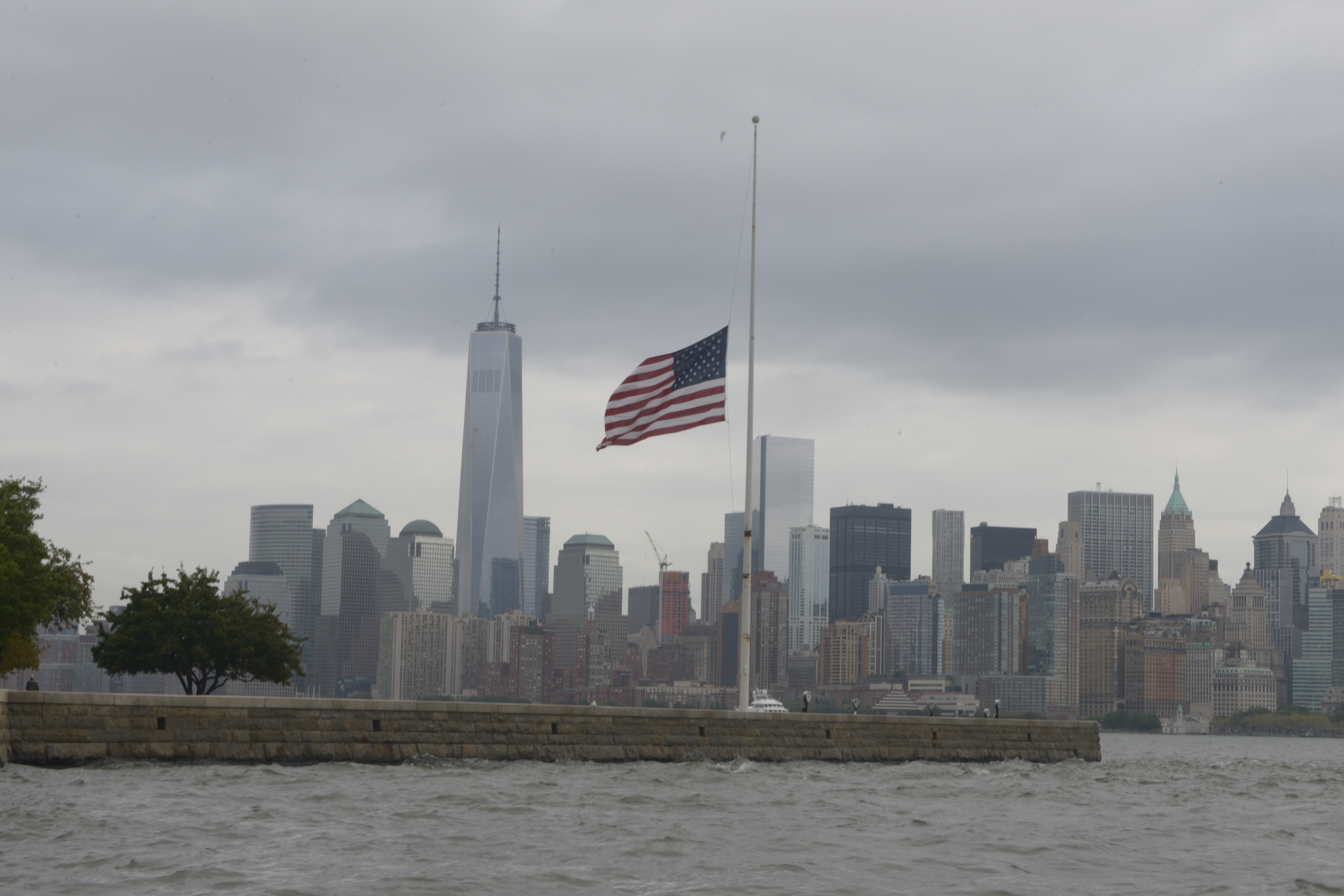
The United States flag flying at half-staff in memorial of the 11 September attacks in New York City, 2014

In the United States, the usual government term for non-nautical use is half-staff. While the term half-mast is commonly used in place of half-staff, U.S. law and post-WW-I military tradition indicate that half-mast is reserved to usage aboard a ship, where flags are typically flown from masts, and at naval ships ashore.

In the United States, the president can issue an executive order for the flag of the United States to be flown at half-staff upon the death of principal figures of the United States government and others, as a mark of respect to their memory. When such an order is issued, all government buildings, offices, public schools, and military bases are to fly their flags at half-staff. Under the United States Flag Code, the flags of states, cities, localities, and pennants of societies should not be placed above the flag of the United States; therefore, all other flags also fly at half-staff when the U.S. flag has been ordered to fly at half-staff. However, this law is only advisory and cannot be enforced.

Under the Flag Code and established traditions by presidential proclamations, the flag of the United States is to be flown at half-staff on rare occasions, in the following circumstances:

- For thirty days (or a month) after the death of a current or former president, or president-elect.
- For ten days after the death of a current vice president, current or retired chief justice, or current speaker of the House of Representatives.
- From the day of death until interment of an associate justice of the Supreme Court, a secretary of an executive or military department, a former vice president or a former Speaker of the House, the president pro tempore of the Senate, or the governor of a state, territory, or possession.
- On the day of death and the day after for a member of Congress.
- On Memorial Day until noon.
- On Patriot Day, the anniversary of the September 11 attacks.
- Upon presidential proclamation, usually after the death of other notable figures or tragic events. As of 29 June 2007 any federal facility within a region which proclaims half-staff to honor a member of the U.S. Armed Forces who died on active duty is required to follow the half-staff proclamation.

Federal law includes a congressional request that the flag be flown at half-staff on Peace Officers Memorial Day (15 May) unless that day is also Armed Forces Day, and at the time of the National Fallen Firefighters Memorial Service. Presidential proclamations also call for the flag to be flown at half-staff on Pearl Harbor Remembrance Day (7 December).

State and territorial governors may also issue half-staff orders.

On 25 August 2026, all Star Spangled Banner Flags including state flags were flown at half staff due to the passing of country musical legend Dolly Parton until 1 September 2026.

=== Vietnam ===
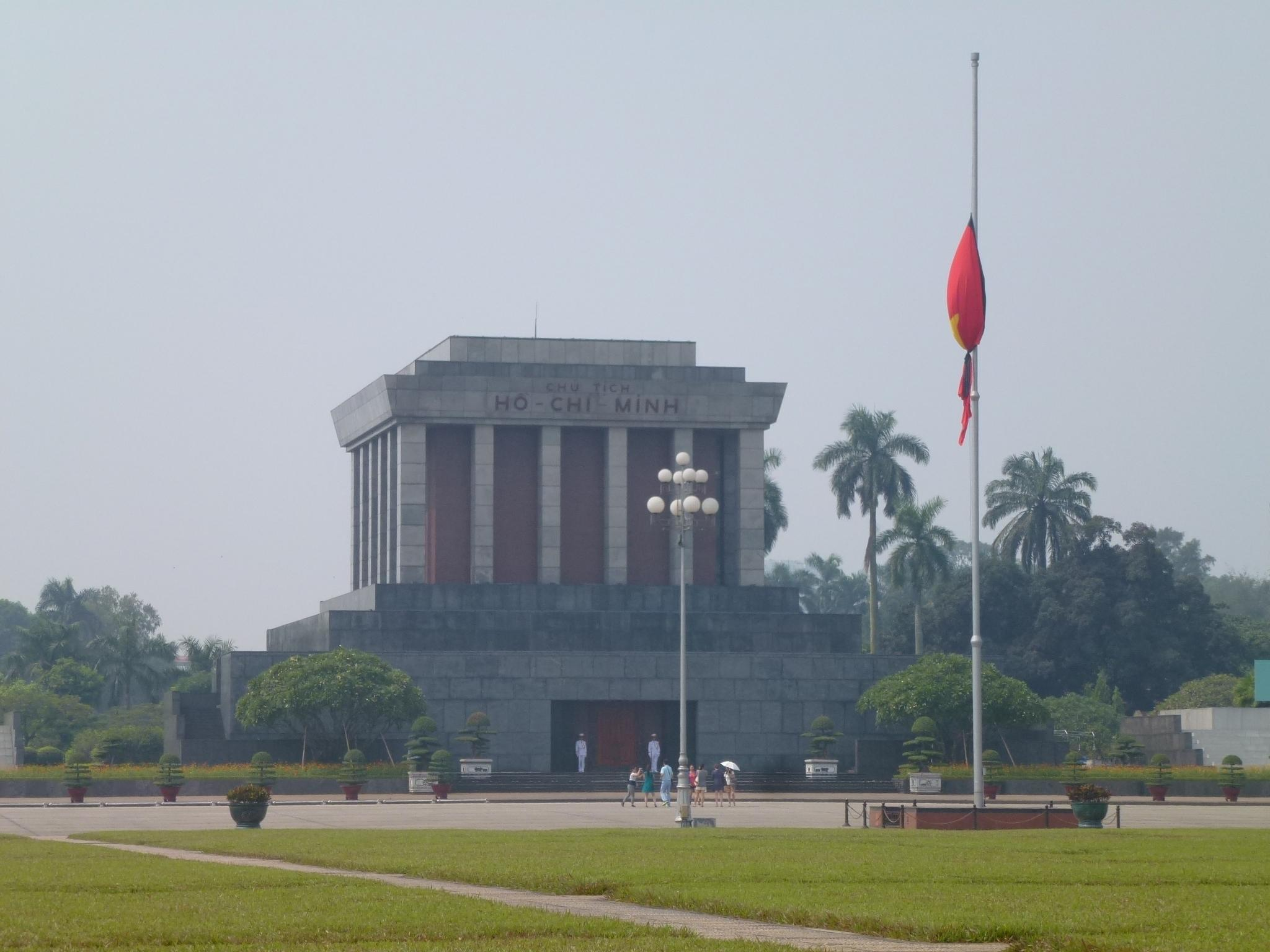
The flag of Vietnam at half-mast for General Võ Nguyên Giáp's funeral

In addition to lowering the flag to half mast, the flag must also have a black mourning band one-tenth the width of the flag, length equal to flag length with a small black strip of cloth tied across it to keep the flag from flying.

=== Zimbabwe ===
The flag of Zimbabwe is flown at half-mast at the conferment of National Hero Status to the deceased.

== See also ==
- International day of mourning
- Moment of silence
- National day of mourning
