= National Aboriginal Veterans Day =

Canadian observance, 8 November

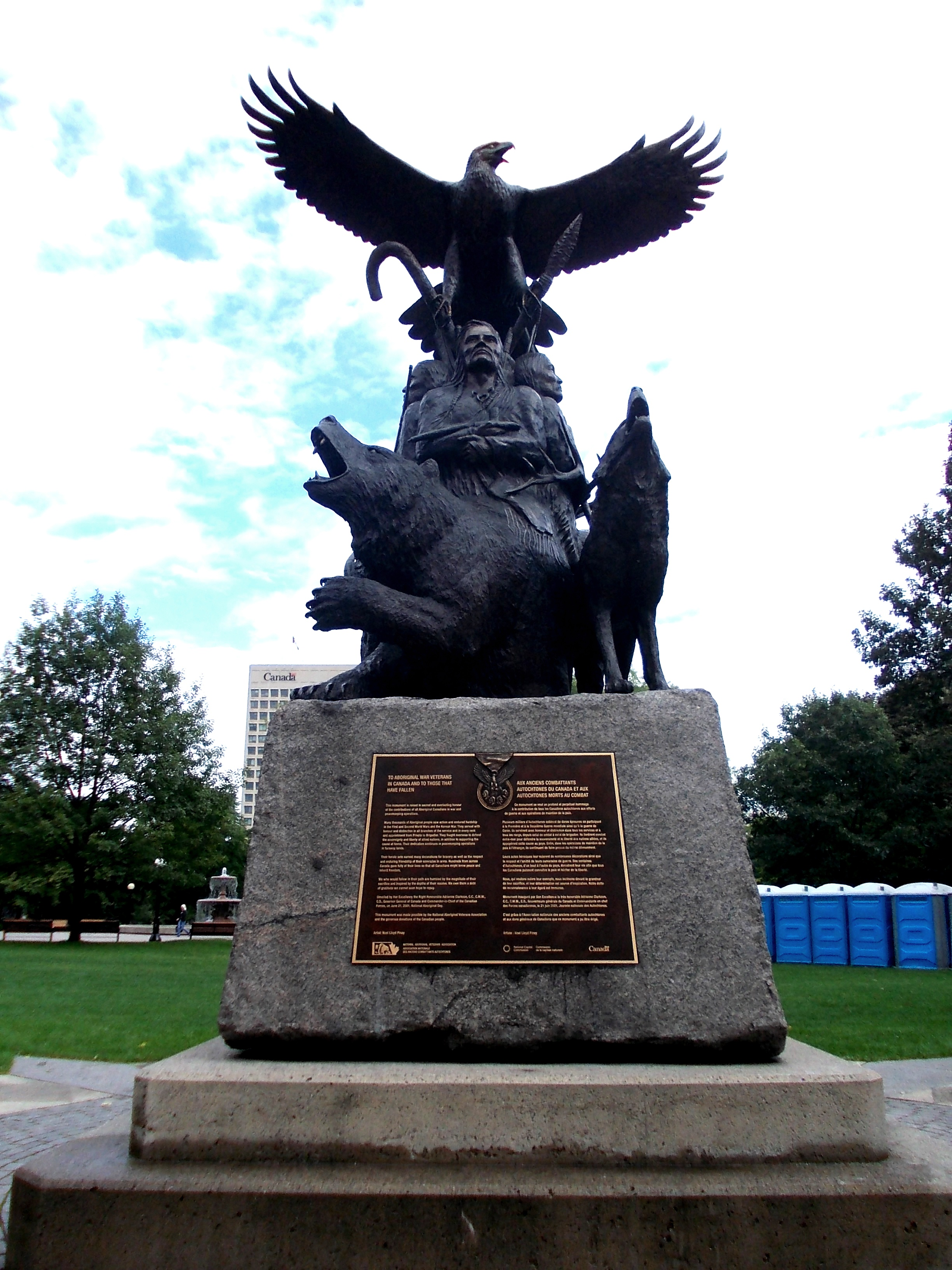
Memorial to Canadian Aboriginal veterans

National Indigenous Veterans Day (also known as National Aboriginal Veterans Day) is a memorial day observed in Canada in recognition of aboriginal contributions to military service, particularly in the First and Second World Wars and the Korean War. It occurs annually on 8 November. The day was first commemorated in 1993 in Winnipeg, Manitoba in 1994, and officially enshrined in Manitoba law in 2025. Indigenous veterans had to overcome many obstacles to serve Canada in these wars, including adjusting to new cultures, sometimes learning to speak new languages (usually English) and travelling long distances to enlist, in addition to being forcibly enfranchised once they returned from war.

The memorial was inaugurated in Winnipeg in 1994, and has since spread nationwide.
