= Załęże =

District of Katowice

- Katowice District
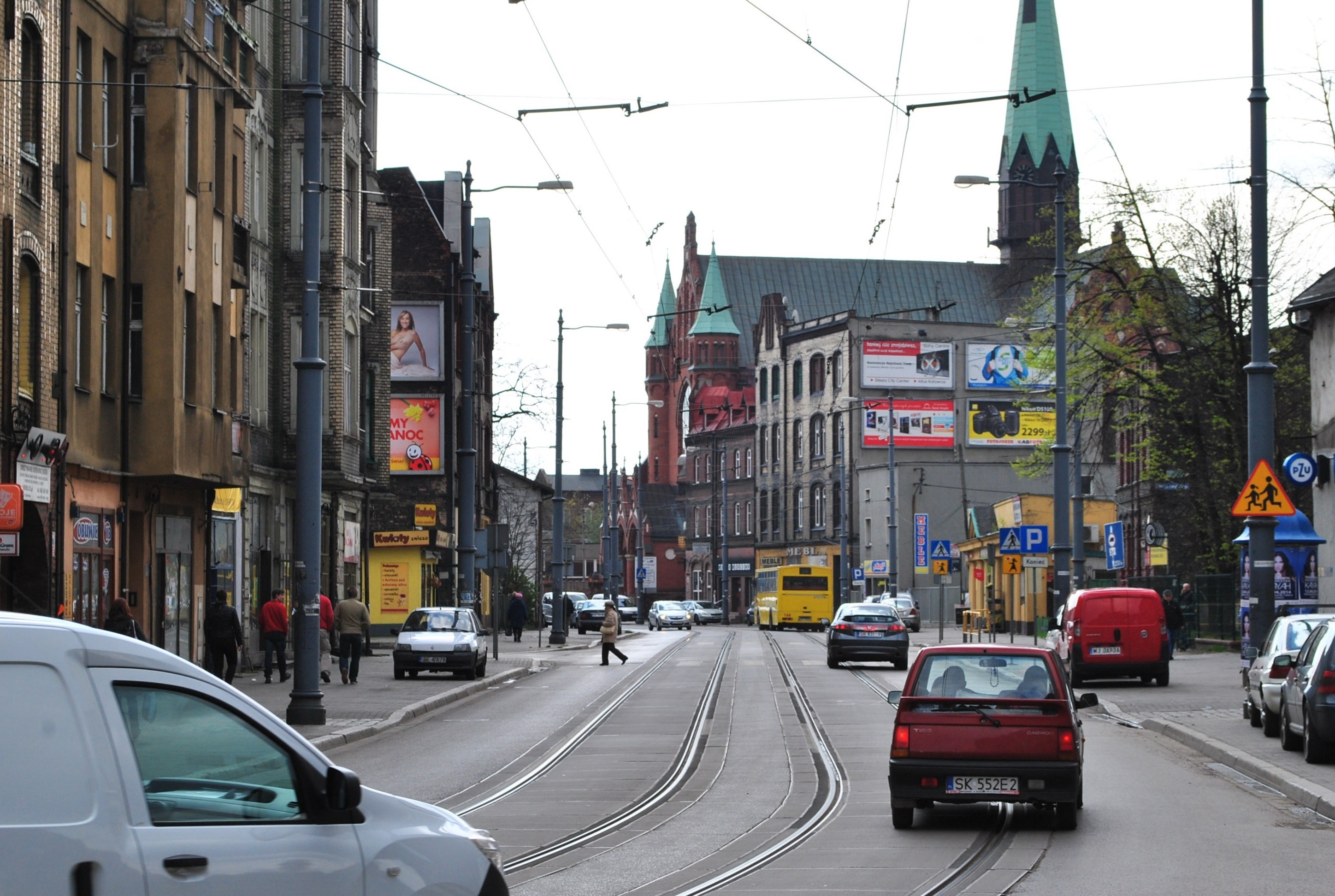
- Gliwicka Street in Załęże. In the background, Saint Joseph's Church

- Coat of arms

- Location of Załęże within Katowice
- Coordinates: 50°16′2″N 18°59′21″E
- Country: Poland
- Voivodeship: Silesian
- County/City: Katowice
- Established: 1 January 1992

Area
  - Total: 3.39 km^{2} (1.31 sq mi)
- Elevation: 265–280 m (869–919 ft)

Population (2020)
  - Total: 8,589
  - Density: 2,530/km^{2} (6,560/sq mi)
- Time zone: UTC+1 (CET)
  - Summer (DST): UTC+2 (CEST)
- Area code: (+48) 032

Załęże (German: Zalenze) is a part and a district of Katowice, located in the north-western part of the city, in the central part of the Upper Silesian conurbation, on the Rawa river. It runs along Gliwicka Street in a characteristic, winding course from the city center to the border of Chorzów. It also borders Osiedle Tysiąclecia, Dąb, Śródmieście, Załęska Hałda-Brynów, and Osiedle Witosa.

It is one of the oldest districts of Katowice, dating back to the 13th century. By the end of the 18th century, the community was an agricultural area, when it began to develop coal mining, iron and zinc industry, which enabled, among other things, rapid population growth. The main industrial plants that had a significant impact on the development of the settlement were the Kleofas Coal Mine and the Baildon Steelworks. On 15 October 1924, Załęże became a district of Katowice. After the collapse of the major industrial plants in the early 21st century Załęże became mainly a service and residential center with a developed cultural base – two theaters are located there: Gry i Ludzie and Żelazny, as well as the Punkt 44 entertainment center.

Development consists mainly of tenements and familoks from the turn of the 19th and 20th centuries, as well as residential and commercial buildings created after World War II. The most valuable objects in Załęże include the Gothic Revival Church of St. Joseph and the Załęże Palace, which is a remnant of a farm complex. Załęże is very well connected by the A4 motorway and Drogowa Trasa Średnicowa, as well as the international E 30 railway line and tram line. The district has an area of 3.39 km² (2.05% of the city's area) and at the end of 2020, it had 8,589 inhabitants.

== Geography ==
=== Location ===
Załęże is one of Katowice's 22 districts (no. 7), belonging to the group of northern districts. It is located in the north-western part of the city and borders Osiedle Tysiąclecia and Dąb to the north, the city of Chorzów to the west (the district of Chorzów Batory), Osiedle Witosa and Załęska Hałda-Brynów to the south, and Śródmieście to the east.

According to Jerzy Kondracki's physio-geographical regionalization, Załęże is located in the Katowice Upland mesoregion, which forms the southern part of the Silesian Upland macroregion, which is itself is a part of the Silesian-Kraków Upland. Historically, it forms part of eastern Upper Silesia.

The boundaries of Załęże are:

- To the north – along the center of the Rawa riverbed between 1 Gałeczka Street in Chorzów and F. W. Grundmann Street in Katowice.
- To the east – along the former route of the siding to the Baildon Steelworks from the Rawa river (now F. W. Grundmann and M. Goeppert-Mayer streets) towards the Katowice railway station, where, near the railway viaduct over Mikołowska Street, it turns south-west and runs along the railway to Kochłowicka Street (A4 motorway). The border surrounds the locomotive depot area from the north and west along Katowice–Brynów railway.
- To the south – from the viaduct over Kochłowicka Street (A4 motorway) over Katowice–Brynów railway along the southern side of the road to Feliks Bocheński Street, where the border turns north and runs along the eastern side of this street to Katowice–Legnica railway. The border along this street is varied and surrounds the buildings at 56, 64, 64a, 66, 90, 92, 94, and 100 F. Bocheński Street from the east, including the Wschodni II shaft complex. The boundary then changes direction to the west and runs along the railway to the border between Katowice and Chorzów.
- To the west – the boundary also forms the border between Katowice and Chorzów. It runs west of J. Piecha Street in Katowice and parallel to P. Wysocki Street in Chorzów.

Historically, Gmina Załęże bordered Dąb to the north, Bogucice to the east, and later Kuźnica Bogucka, Katowice, and Brynów, as well as Ligota and Kochłowice to the south, and Hajduki to the west. The boundaries were:

- To the north – along the Rawa river and through the building complex of the Baildon Steelworks.
- To the east – near the former route of the Baildon Steelworks siding and south along Przodowników Street to the intersection with Brygadzistów Street.
- To the south – along Brygadzistów Street and further west through the Załęże Forest.
- To the west – along the present-day border between the cities of Katowice and Chorzów.

=== Geology and soils ===
Załęże is located in the Upper Silesian Sinkhole, in an area with horst structures. At the turn of the Devonian and Carboniferous periods, the Paleozoic bedrock of the Silesian Uplands was disturbed by the formation of a sinkhole, which during the Carboniferous was filled with conglomerates, sandstones, and shales containing bituminous coal deposits. The top of the Carboniferous strata is at an elevation of 220–240 m above sea level. Outcrops of Upper Carboniferous formations are located in the higher part of Załęże, in the area of the A4 motorway junction with Feliks Bocheński Street. They consist of claystones, mudstones, and coal of the Załęże and Orzesze layers.

The remaining area of Załęże, in terms of surface formations, is composed of materials originating from the Cenozoic period. The valleys of the Rawa and its former tributary (the Osiek Stream, now known as Wujek Trench, running along the current eastern border of Załęże) – 250–350 m wide – are composed of the youngest materials – Holocene silts, sands, and river gravels. Holocene river sediments in the Rawa valley reach a depth of 6 meters. The remaining area of Załęże consists of Pleistocene eluvia of tills. Since between 2006 and 2007, the district has been considered geologically stable, mainly due to the abandonment of coal mining, and there is no mining damage there.

The soils in Załęże have been subjected to strong anthropogenic pressure as a result of settlement and industrial activity, which is why the proportion of initial soils is significant there. The soils in the district are mainly anthrosols, formed from tills. The classified soils in Załęże have a IV soil quality rating. They are contaminated with heavy metals (lead, cadmium, and zinc) caused by emissions, especially industrial, and coal combustion.

=== Terrain ===
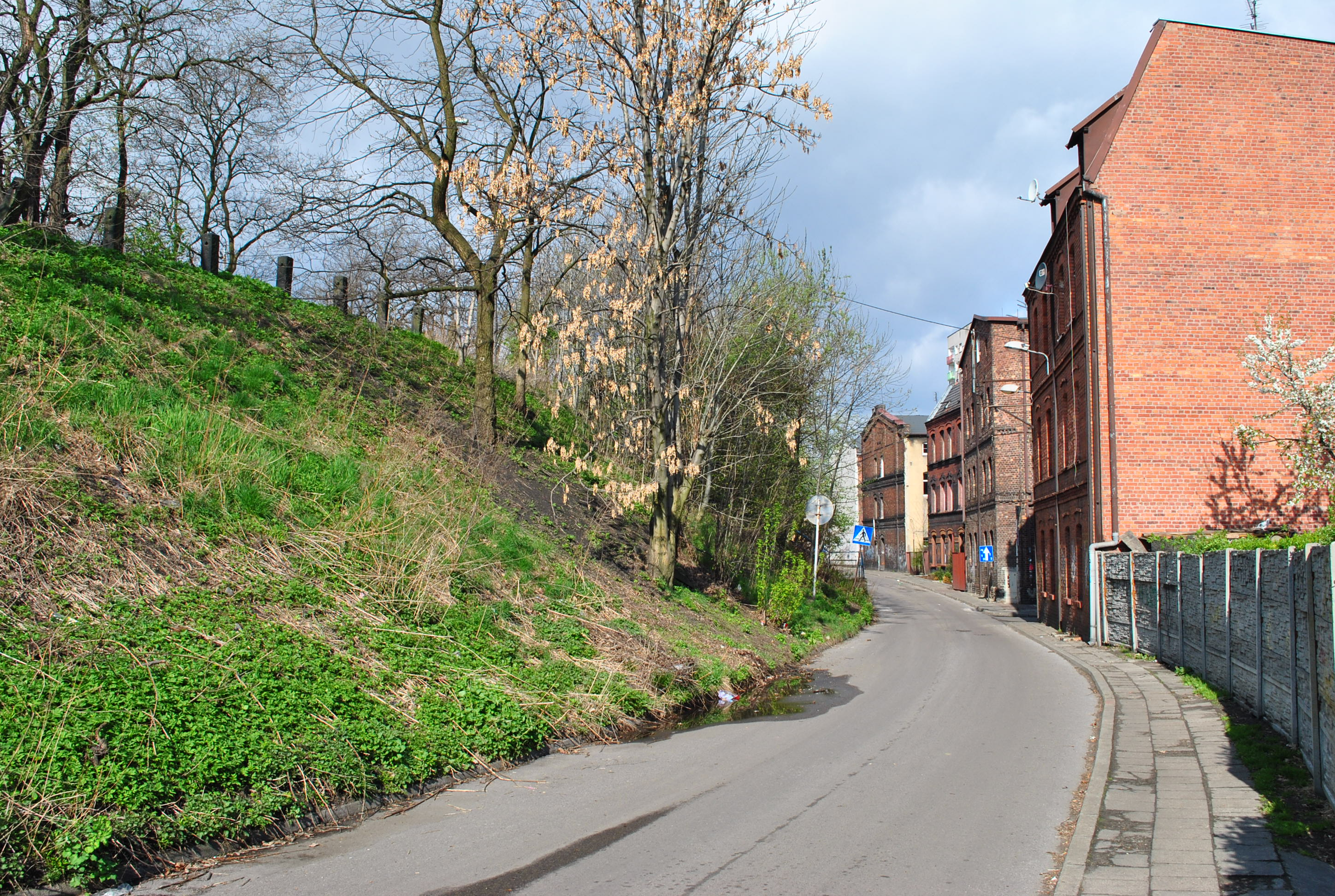
Paweł Pośpiech Street; on the left, an artificially created embankment (2014)

According to morphological units, most of Załęże is located in the Rawa Depression, which stretches along the Rawa river valley. It is deeply incised (over 100 m) into Carboniferous formations and forms the bottom of the valley together with the Pleistocene terrace. The southern part of the district is located in the Kochłowice Hills, which are characterized by flattened terrain and deeply incised valleys. Załęże is characterized by a slight variation in surface area, which has been largely transformed as a result of anthropogenic pressure, especially in the form of spoil tips and embankments of transport routes – mainly railways (average 3.0–4.5 m) and roads: on Kochłowicka, John Paul II, and Paweł Pośpiech streets (the height of the latter embankment reaches 6 m). Levelling, sedimentation, and subsidence of various materials play an important role in changing the terrain of Załęże.

The surface of Załęże slopes downwards towards the northeast, in the direction of Rawa, following its course. The lowest point in the district is the Rawa riverbed (approximately 260 m above sea level), and the highest is Kochłowicka Street at the intersection with Żeliwna Street (approximately 285 m above sea level). On average, the eastern part of Załęże is located at an elevation of 265 m above sea level (the intersection of Gliwicka and Paweł Pośpiech streets, near Primary School No. 20 and the Załęże Palace). The western part is higher – the intersection of Gliwicka and Wiśniowa streets is at 270 m above sea level, and Osiedle Kolonia Mościckiego is the highest, at 275 m above sea level.

The highest elevation within the historical boundaries of Gmina Załęże is Cisowa Góra hill (also known as Komarzy Summit), with a height of 338.8 m above sea level. Its summit is located in the Załęże Forest, west of the buildings of Załęska Hałda. It is an inlier made of Upper Carboniferous rocks.

=== Climate ===
The climate of Załęże differs only slightly from the conditions prevailing throughout Katowice. It is modified by both climatic and local factors, as well as by human activity (e.g., the urban heat island effect). The climate of the district is influenced more by oceanic than continental factors, and is occasionally modified by tropical air masses arriving from the southwest through the Moravian Gate. The average annual temperature recorded at the station in Muchowiec in the period 1961–2005 was 8.1 °C. The warmest month was July (17.8 °C) and the coldest was January (−2.2 °C). The average annual sunshine duration in the period 1966–2005 was 1,474 hours. The average annual precipitation in the period 1951–2005 was 713.8 mm. The average duration of snow cover is 60–70 days, and the growing season lasts on average 200–220 days. Westerly and southwesterly winds prevail, with an average speed of 2.4 m/s.

=== Surface and groundwater ===
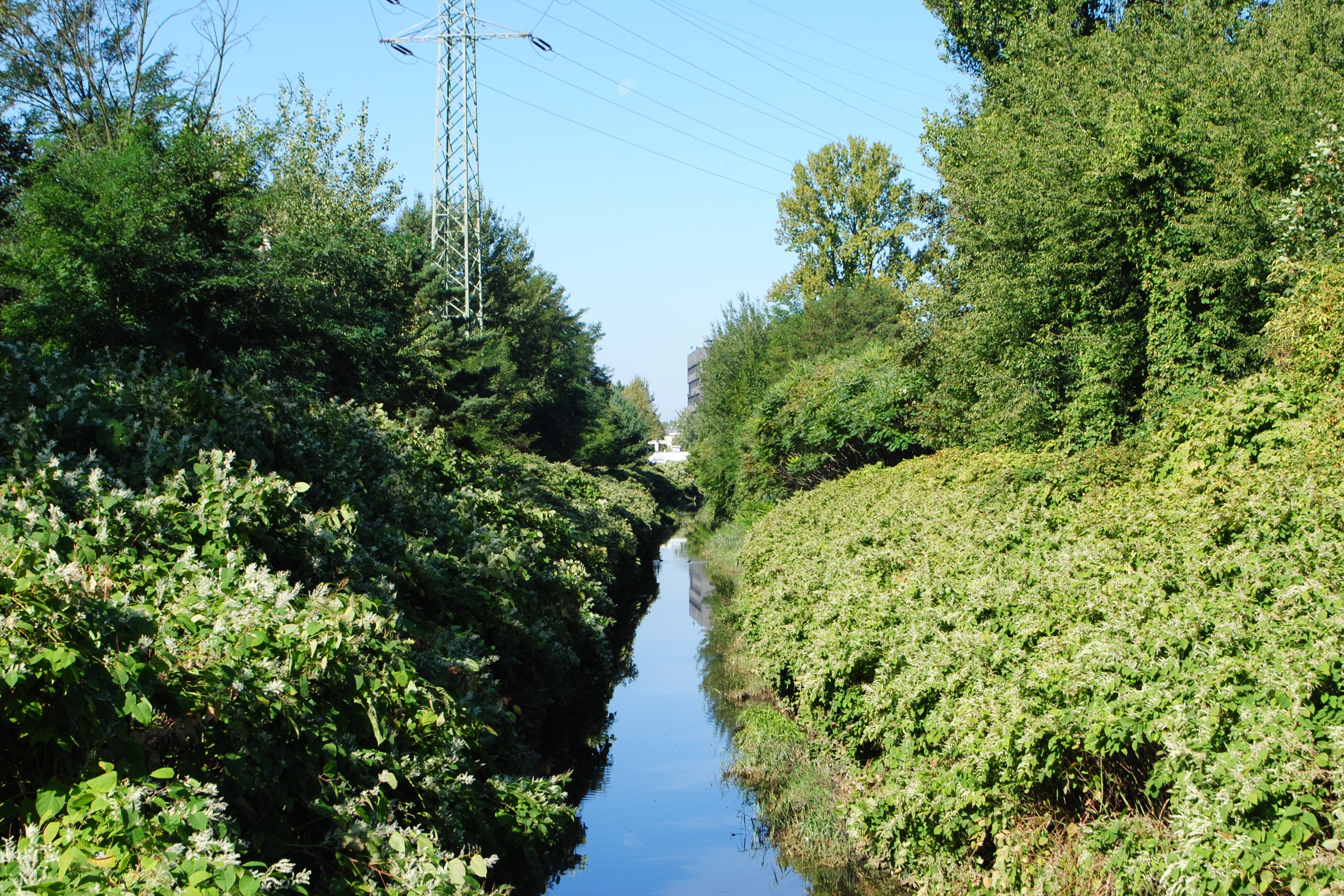
Rawa river near Żelazna Street; view to the west (2024)

Załęże is located entirely within the Vistula drainage basin, in the basin of the Rawa river. The river flows from west to east through the district, with its course is fully regulated and embanked. It receives treated and raw sewage as well as rainwater. Between 1992 and 2002, the share of foreign water (municipal and industrial sewage) was approximately 70%, which caused significant disturbances to the natural flow of water. In Załęże, the Rawa has one tributary – Wujek Trench, running along the eastern border of the district. However, there are no water reservoirs or ponds there.

The hydrological network in Załęże has undergone major changes as a result of ongoing urbanization and industrialization. Previously, there were a number of watercourses, including the Osiek Stream (which formed the eastern border of Załęże), the Obrocki Stream (which flowed northeast through the pond in the Kleofas Coal Mine), and the stream running along the current Feliks Bocheński Street, flowing into the forge pond. As early as the 16th century, there were a number of dammed ponds in Rawa, which served the forges, were used as fish ponds, and were also intended to prevent flooding. The Załęże Pond, which no longer exists, was created at the end of the 15th century.

In terms of hydrogeological conditions, Quaternary and Carboniferous aquifers are distinguished. The Quaternary level in the formations is associated with loose sandy-gravel and sandy-silty intermoraine, fluvial-glacial, and fluvial sediments. It is a discontinuous level, locally separating (till sediments) into two or three aquifers. The Upper Carboniferous aquifer consists of aquiferous sandstones of the Upper Silesian sandstone series and the paralic series. Due to coal mining, the waters of the Carboniferous aquifer have been drained to the deepest exploitation levels throughout the entire Katowice.

=== Nature and environmental protection ===
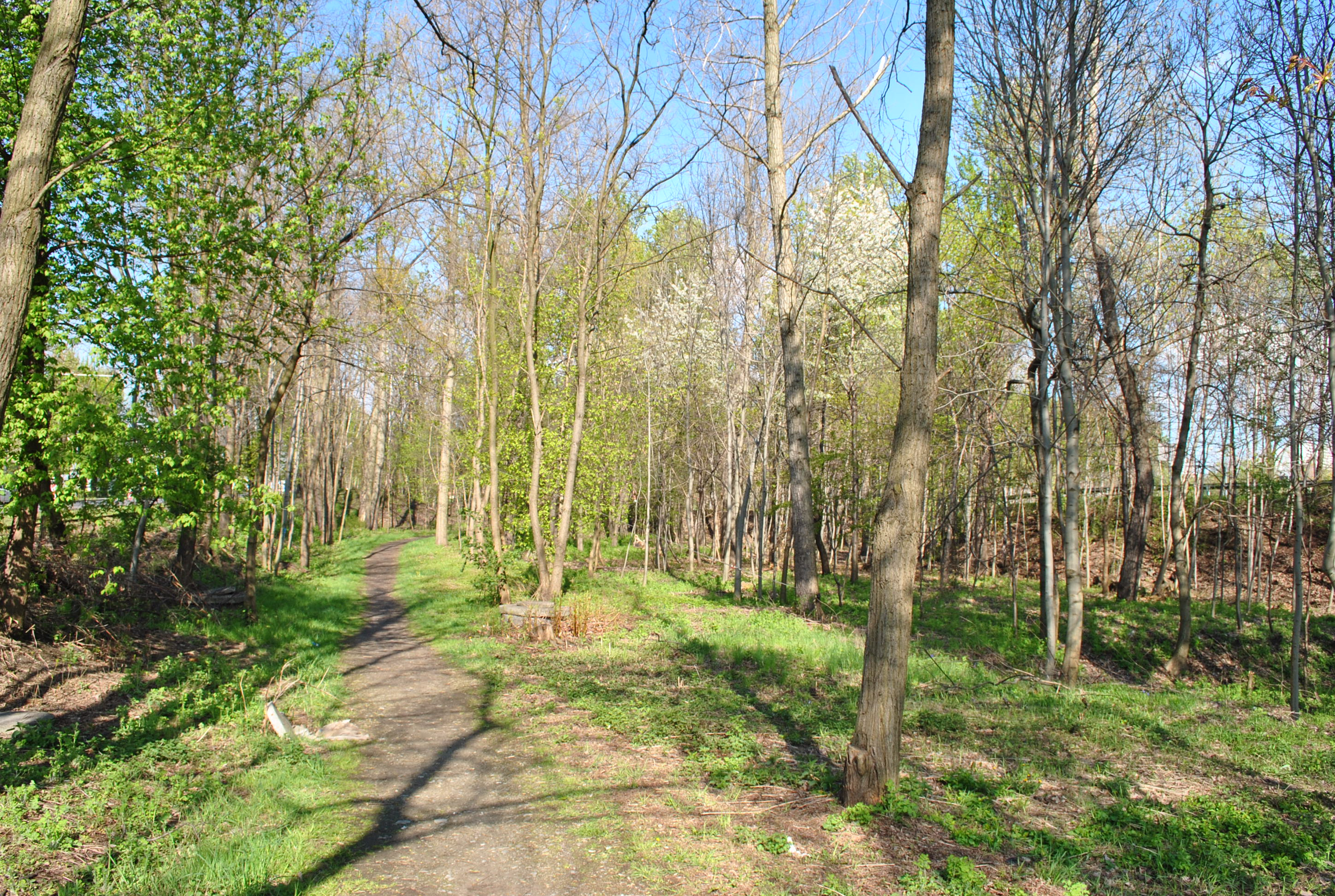
Unmanaged green areas along Gliwicka and John Paul II streets

The natural vegetation of Załęże has been shaped since the last glaciation 12,000–16,000 years ago. Its condition and abundance are influenced by several factors, including the terrain and water resources, and since the beginning of the 19th century, human activity has also had a decisive impact. Originally, the Rawa river valley was covered with marshes and peatland. These areas were overgrown with riparian forests and alder carrs, while further away from the valley there were oak-hornbeam forests, and on the hills in the southern part of Załęże there were beech woods. The forested past of the district is evidenced by its name – Załęże – meaning a place behind the riparian forest. The development of mining and metallurgy in this part of Katowice resulted in the destruction of significant forest areas in the 16th, 18th, and 19th centuries. Industrial and urban development was accompanied by environmental degradation, which in the second half of the 20th century reached proportions unseen in other parts of the country.

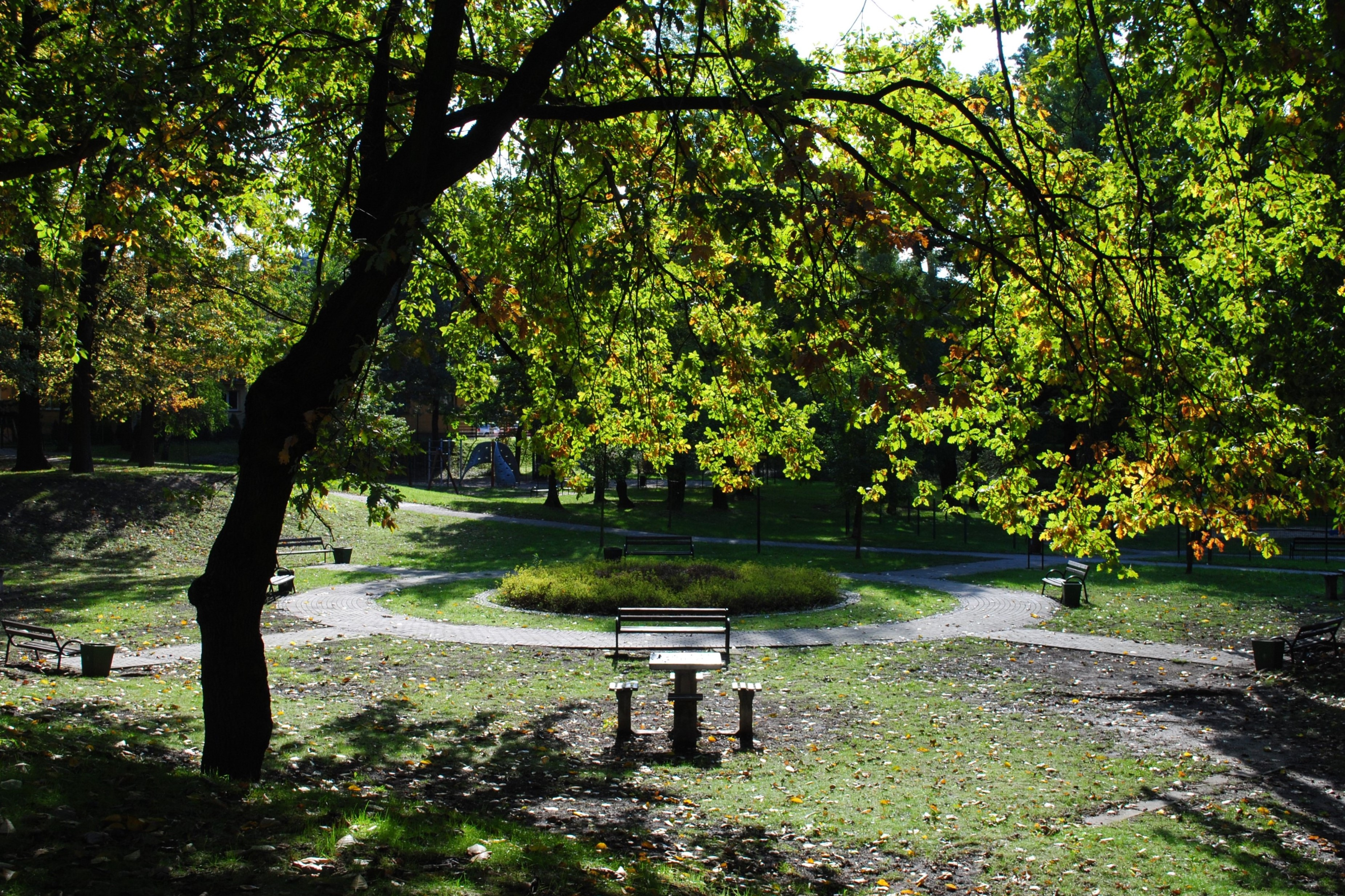
Part of Załęże Park (2024)

Today, most of Załęże is covered with ruderal vegetation in anthropogenic habitats of developed areas and urban wasteland. Between them, spaces of post-agricultural and post-forest vegetation have developed (western and south-eastern parts of the district). In several places there is also cultivated vegetation, planted and maintained in the form of parks and urban lawns. The unmanaged green areas are dominated mainly by maple, birch, poplar, and linden. There are also introduced plant species – a group of hawthorns in the area of Tokarska Street. Specimens of old common ivy are also found at the cemetery on Paweł Pośpiech Street. Conditions were also created for the development of synanthropic animals, the most important of which are birds, including those that have long accompanied humans, such as the house sparrow and pigeon, as well as native birds that have adapted to urban conditions, including swifts, house martins, and barn swallows.

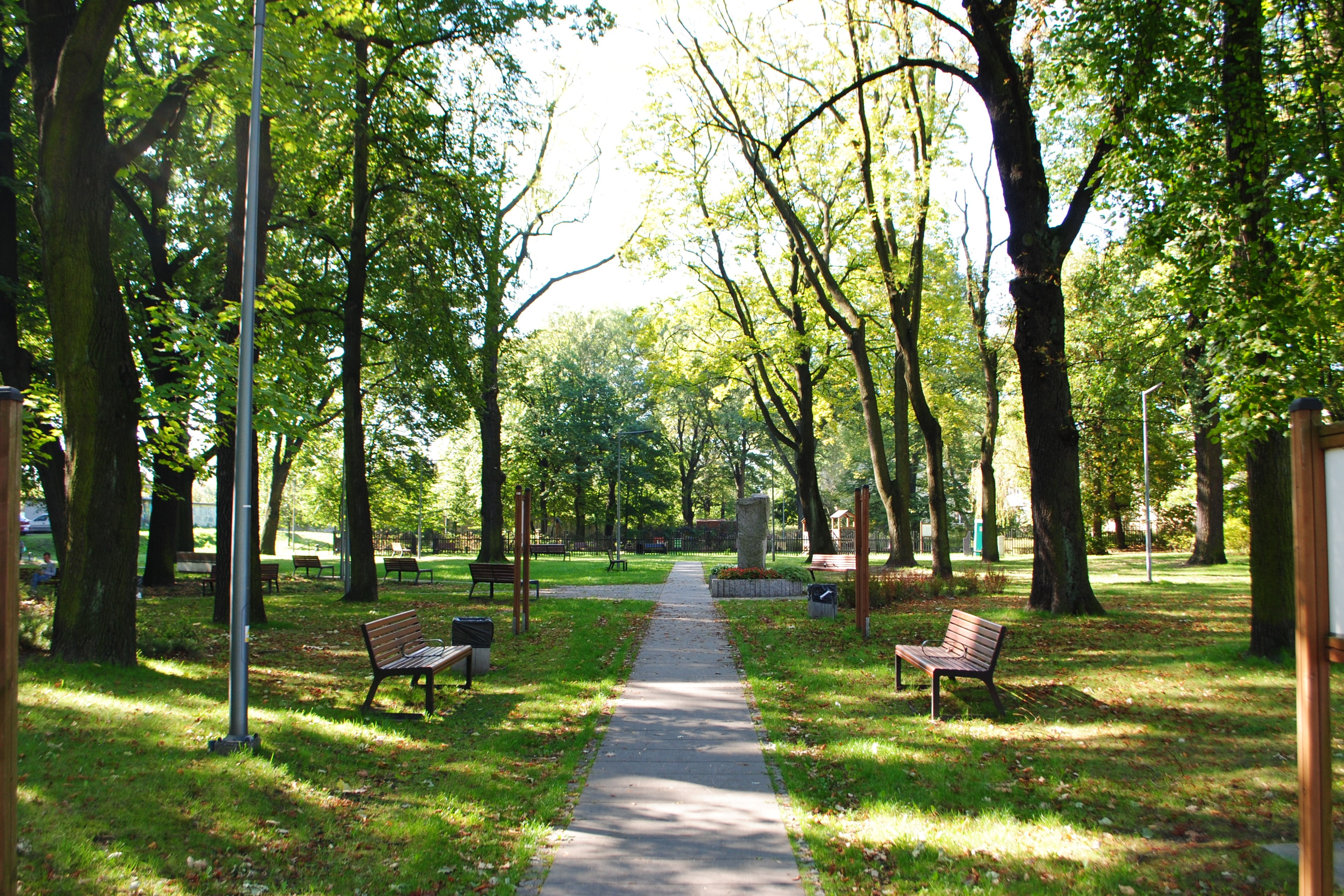
Józef Londzin Square (2024)

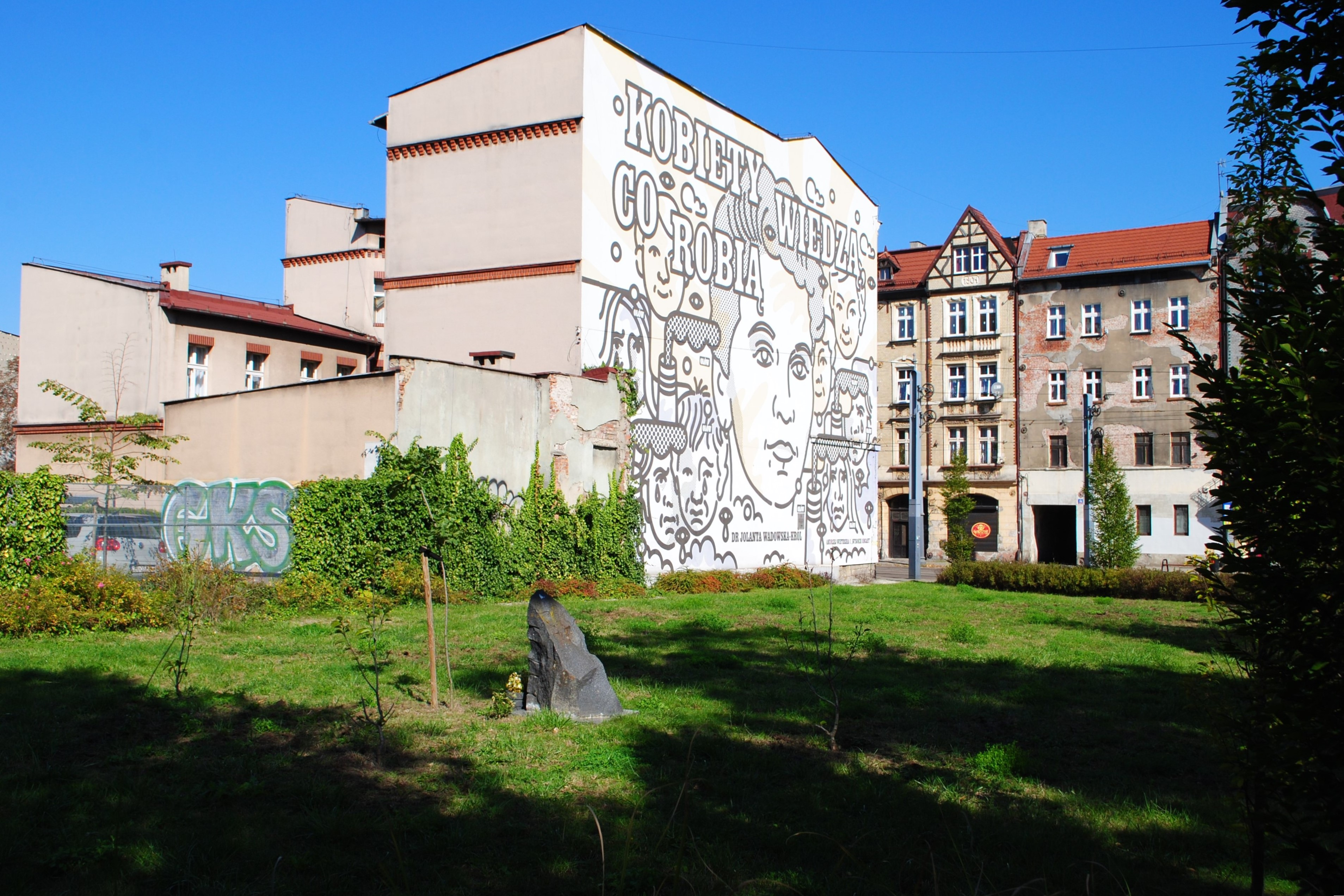
Square between M. Ledóchowski and Gliwicka streets (2024)

Due to its high level of urbanization, Załęże has a relatively small proportion of green spaces. There are also no protected areas or natural monuments. The main forms of greenery in the district are allotment gardens, as well as managed and unmanaged green areas. Larger green spaces are the allotment gardens in the area of F. Bocheński Street and the A4 motorway, as well as the Bugla Recreation and Leisure Center in the south-eastern part of the district. In the northern part, between Bracka and John Paul II streets, Załęże borders the former Stawy na Tysiącleciu ecological site, which is a habitat for amphibians and waterfowl.

The following parks, squares, and plazas are located in Załęże:

- Załęże Park – established in 1938,
- Józef Londzin Square – forms the southern part of the park complex of the Załęże Palace,
- Stanisław Bareja Square – a square in front of the Punkt 44 entertainment center, established on 21 December 2011,
- Jerzy Kukuczka Square – a square located in the area of P. Pośpiech and M. Ledóchowski streets, established on 30 March 2017.

Between 2018 and 2019, the square on Gliwicka Street between buildings nos. 52 and 58, developed on the site of a former food pavilion and a tenement, underwent revitalization. Yews, hornbeams, and cherry plum trees were planted there, as well as flower beds separated by barberry shrubs. In mid-June 2019, work began on the revitalization of Józef Londzin Square. As part of this work, new benches, bicycle racks, trash cans, as well as playground equipment and an outdoor gym were installed. The old trees were left in place, and new shrubs and climbing plants were planted. The revitalized square was opened to the public at the turn of April and May 2020.

Allotment gardens in Załęże are managed by the Silesian Regional Board of the Polish Allotment Gardeners' Association, Katowice Branch. The following gardens are located in the district: Baildon (2 Pośpiech Street; 2.68 ha; 70 plots), Baildon Anioł colony (1 F. Anioł Street; 0.26 ha; 15 plots), Baildon Gliwicka region (1 Gliwicka Street; 0.36 ha; 10 plots), Chryzantema (1 Pośpiech Street; 0.68 ha; 40 plots), Dobra Nadzieja (1 F. Bocheński Street; 5.60 ha; 130 plots), Jedność (1 Żeliwna Street; 8.91 ha; 210 plots), Świt main colony (1 Gliwicka Street; 2.69 ha; 60 plots), Świt colony (1 Gliwicka Street; 0.43 ha; 15 plots), and Zakątek Kolejarza (1 18 Sierpnia Street; 0.93 ha; 30 plots).

== Name ==
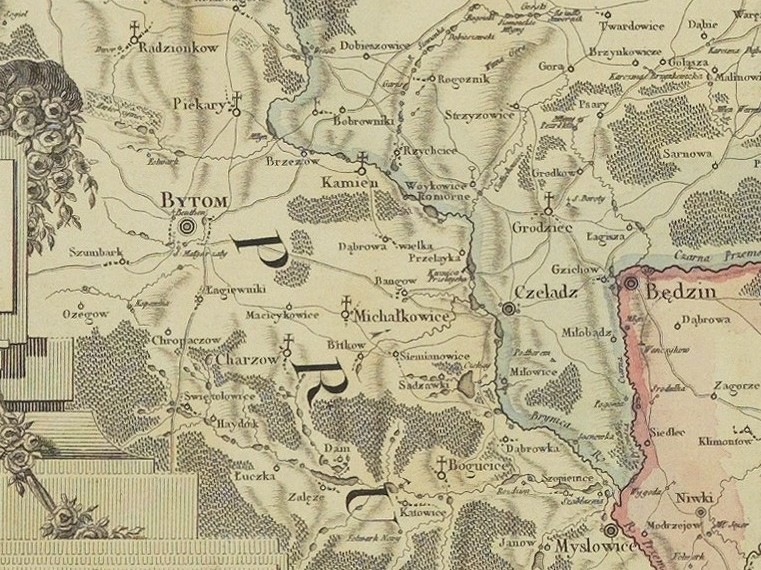
"Zalęze" on a map from 1792

The name Załęże is derived by historians from the area za łęgiem ("beyond the riparian forest"), located near Dąb on the southern bank of the Rawa river. It is therefore a topographical name, reflecting the former vegetation and landscape (łęg meaning a swampy meadow or swampy forest).

The name of the present district has been written in many forms. At the turn of the 18th and 19th centuries, due to difficulties in pronouncing the Polish name, the spelling was modified to Salensche. There were persistent returns to spelling the gmina's name with Z, so this form was restored, but it had many variations, e.g.: Zaluzy, Załęże, Zalnzie, Zalnzy, Zoluzi. Historical records of the name from the Middle Ages onwards included: Zalanze, Zaluzie, Zaluze, Zaloze, Zalęzie, Zalenze. Local Silesians most often pronounced the name of the gmina in the dialect form: Żołyndzie, Zołynzie.

Załęże also has its own folk etymology. It is provided by Robert Borowy, a researcher of local mining history – based on the dialect pronunciation of Żołyndzie – who derives the origin of the name from a distortion caused by the Germanization of the spelling of the original name of the settlement: Żołędzie ("acorns"). According to him, the original name is evidenced by the old seal of the gmina, which originally featured three branches, each with an acorn growing from it. In later seals and in the coat of arms from the interwar period, a single branch with an acorn was used. In its original spelling, the undocumented name Żołędzie would have appeared as Zołenzie, Zołynzie, or Zołnzie. The common, Germanized name of the gmina was Zalenze. Referring to Borowy's etymology and linking the name to the image of the town's coat of arms, historians point out that the emblem did not appear until the beginning of the 19th century, and the name Załęże itself dates back to the Middle Ages (already recorded in 1360).

Ginter Pierończyk also supports the origin of the name Załęże from Żołędzie. The author points, among other things, to a record in a document from 1564, in which Mikołaj Salomon sells the Kuźniczysko manor and pond in Załęże to Grzegorz Krawiec. The entry reads: Ktemu bendzie powinien dacz za siano dwadzieścia groszy polskich, czwiertnię owsa od zolendzia, dwoye kury dziesięć yayec ("He shall also be obliged to give twenty Polish groszy for hay, a quarter of oats from the acorn [zolendzia], two hens, and ten eggs"). The announcement of the Royal Regency in Opole dated 17 May 1875 mentions the Polish name Zołęże.

== History ==
=== Origins and history until the 18th century ===
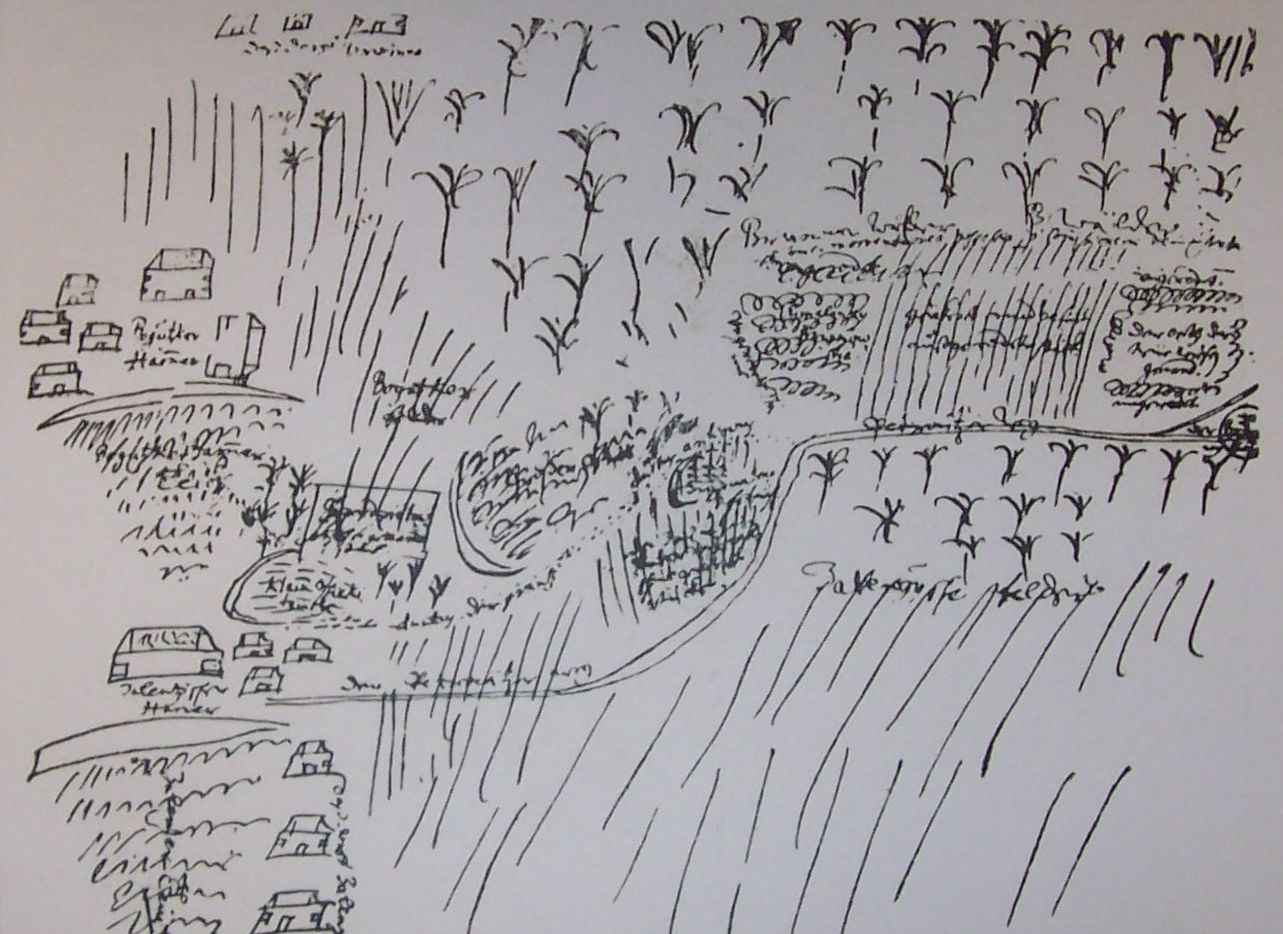
Oldest situational plan of present-day Katowice from 1686 (map oriented eastward); at the bottom left, the following places are depicted, among others: the Załęże forge, the Załęże pond, the village of Załęże, and the Piotrowice road

Załęże was founded in the 13th century. Ludwik Musioł states that this took place around 1280, when it was established as a village under Magdeburg rights. At that time, wooden buildings were initially concentrated around a folwark dating back to the turn of the 13th and 14th centuries. The oldest information about Załęże comes from a document issued by the Duke of Opava and Racibórz, Nicholas II, on 15 December 1360, confirming Otto of Pilcza's ownership of the villages of Jaźwce, Załęże, Bogucice, and the town of Mysłowice. This document defined the boundaries of the village, which were finally established after the flood of 1734, and mentioned the so-called great road (Latin: via magna) passing through Załęże at that time. Legally, the present-day district belonged to the Duchy of Racibórz, and later to the Duchy of Pless. In the 15th century, the village was destroyed as a result of the plundering expeditions of Duke Wenceslaus III. Its reconstruction was undertaken by the Salomon family, who owned Załęże from 1536 to 1614. Large peasant farms were not rebuilt, and smaller plots were established for smallholders.

Although the agricultural character of the village persisted until the 19th century, many iron forges were already operating in Załęże in the 15th century. The origins of the Załęże forge, built near the Rawa river in the area of Żelazna Street, likely date back to the second half of the 15th century. Along with it, a blacksmith village of the same name was established in the area of the intersection of the present-day Gliwicka and Żelazna streets. According to Robert Borowy, by 1550 this establishment had already become a sawmill, and the forge was reopened there around 1640. Before 1734, it was converted into a mill, which operated until around 1855.

After the death of Katarzyna Salomonowa, Załęże was inherited in 1617 by Andrzej Lipski, and then by his sons, while between 1641 and 1650, it belonged to Piotr Gręboszowski. Since then, the village has often changed owners. In 1686, a hand-drawn plan was developed after many years of border disputes between the owner of Katowice and Załęże, Jan Krzysztof Mieroszewski, and Rudolf Józef Kamieński of Świętochłowice. It depicted, among other things, the eastern part of Załęże, incincluding the ponds on Buglowizna, the buildings of the forge, the village itself, the fields, the forest, and the road to Piotrowice.

Załęże remained a free village until the 18th century – in 1718 it no longer existed, and its lands were incorporated into the manor area. The origins of the free village date back to the time of its founding. According to data from the Carolinian Cadastre from the mid-18th century, there were 21 smallholders and 20 cotters living in Załęże, but no peasants at that time. Two folwarks were established in the place of Załęże Forest: Obroki, established in the 18th century and known for sheep breeding, and Owsiska (the western part of Załęska Hałda), dating back to the 19th century, where grain was grown. Until the end of the 18th century, agriculture was the main source of livelihood for the population of Załęże, among others. Grains that did not require good soil, such as rye, oats, and barley, were cultivated there. In 1792, the first coal mine, Charlotte, was established in Załęże (in Załęska Hałda), whose first owners were Karol Wachowski and Daniel Freytag.

=== 19th and early 20th centuries ===
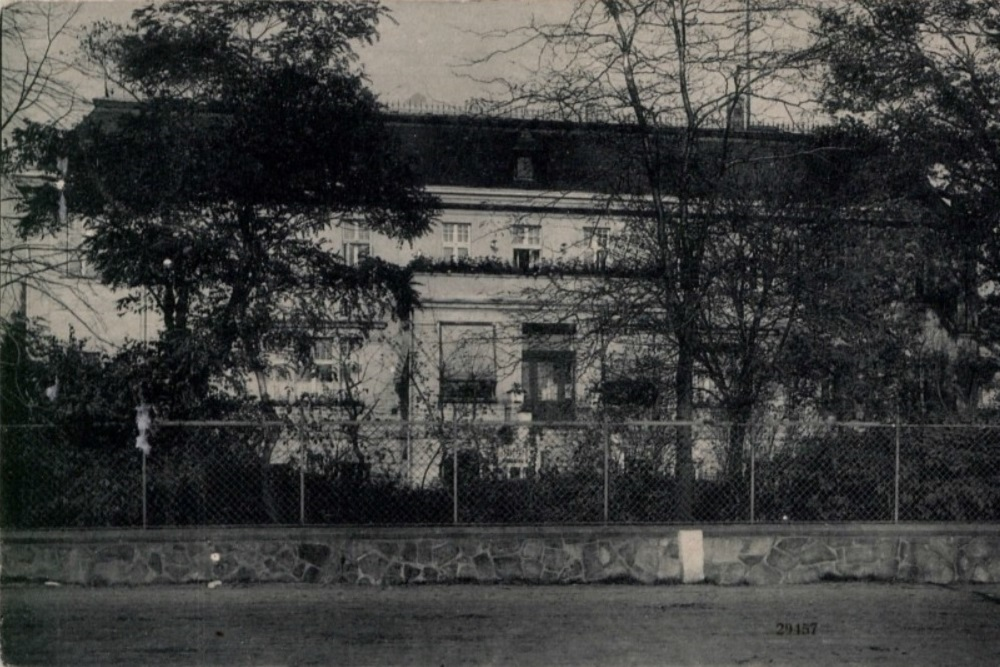
Załęże Palace in a photograph from 1909; view from the south

In the 19th century, Załęże was owned by Loebel Freund (1839–1845, or 1840–1845), Karol Neumann (from 1845), and Ernest Georges de la Tour – a descendant of a French Huguenot family – and then the Georg von Giesches Erben company, which had its central administration there from 1887, in the palace at what later became 159 Gliwicka Street. Until around 1816, Załęże was located within the borders of the Duchy of Pless. At that time, a gmina was established, which in 1817 became part of the Bytom County, separate from the Załęże manor area. In 1873, it was incorporated into the Katowice County, with its seat in a building at what later became 102 Gliwicka Street, constructed in 1897.

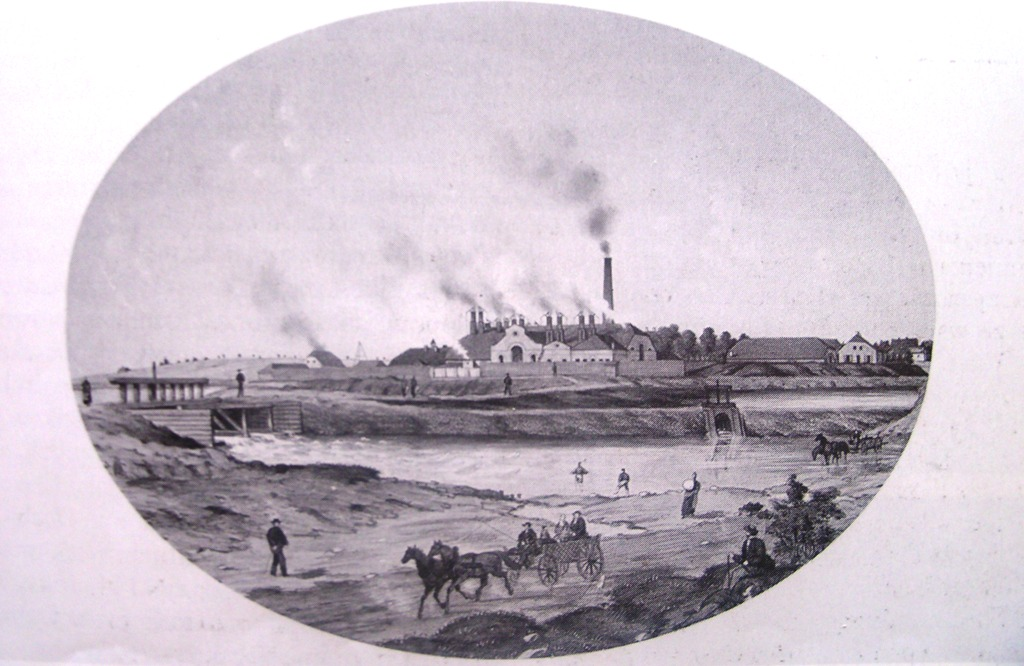
Puddling furnace of John Baildon in a lithograph from the mid-19th century (the later Baildon Steelworks)

On 3 October 1846, the Upper Silesian Railway opened a railway running through Załęże from Świętochłowice to Mysłowice, which was part of the railway from Wrocław. No railway station was built in Załęże itself at that time.

In 1841, the small Victor Coal Mine was opened in Załęże, which belonged to Gustav von Kramsta from 1853. He had also bought the Charlotte Coal Mine earlier in 1853, and in 1858 he merged the two plants into one – Victor. In 1899, it became part of the modern Oheim Coal Mine (later the Wujek Coal Mine). In 1840, a much larger plant was established in Załęże – Cleophas Coal Mine (later the Kleofas Coal Mine). Between 1862 and 1886, it was not in operation, and mining resumed after it was bought in 1880 by Georg von Giesches Erben.

In 1823, John Baildon initiated the construction of a puddling mill in the area of the former Załęże forge, which was the beginning of the Baildon Steelworks. In 1840, on the initiative of Gustav von Kramsta, the Victor Zinc Smelter was established in Gmina Załęże. The Johanna Zinc Smelter was also built, founded by Karl Godulla and Loebel Freund. In 1867, Dawid Czwiklitzer started a soap factory in Katowice, which his son Adolf moved to Załęże between 1922 and 1925 (the later Pollena-Savona Katowice Household Chemistry Plant at 7/9 P. Pośpiech Street).

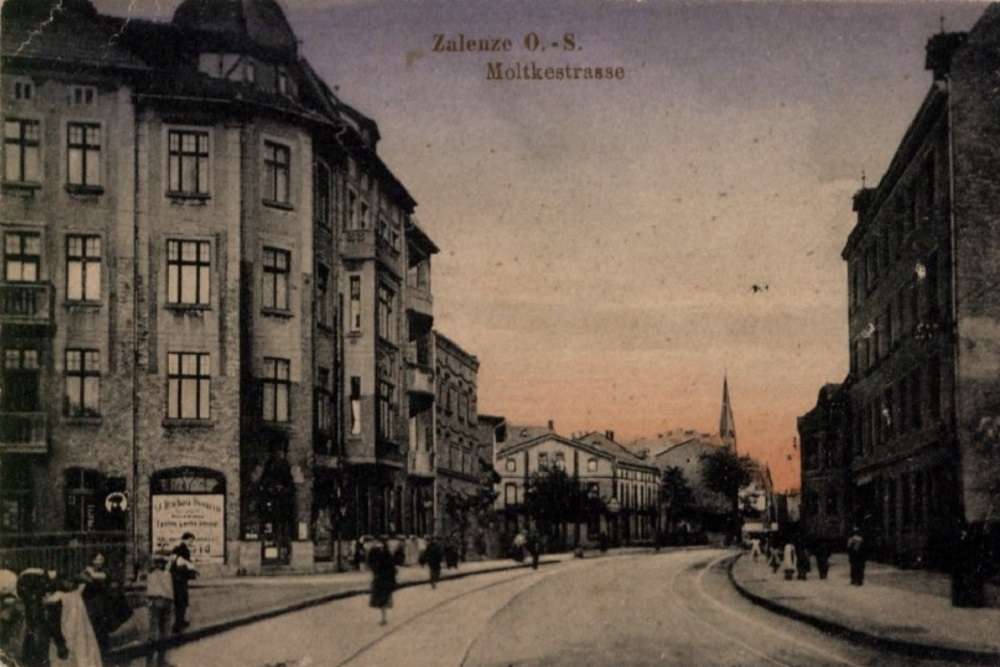
Gliwicka Street around 1915

Thanks to the development of industrial activity, Załęże transformed into a workers' settlement, and agricultural activity continued mainly on manor lands. In 1845, the percentage of farmers in Załęże was 45%, while in 1861 it was already 21%. At the turn of the 19th and 20th centuries, a workers' colony was built for the employees of the Cleophas Coal Mine between the present-day F. Bocheński and Wiśniowa streets.

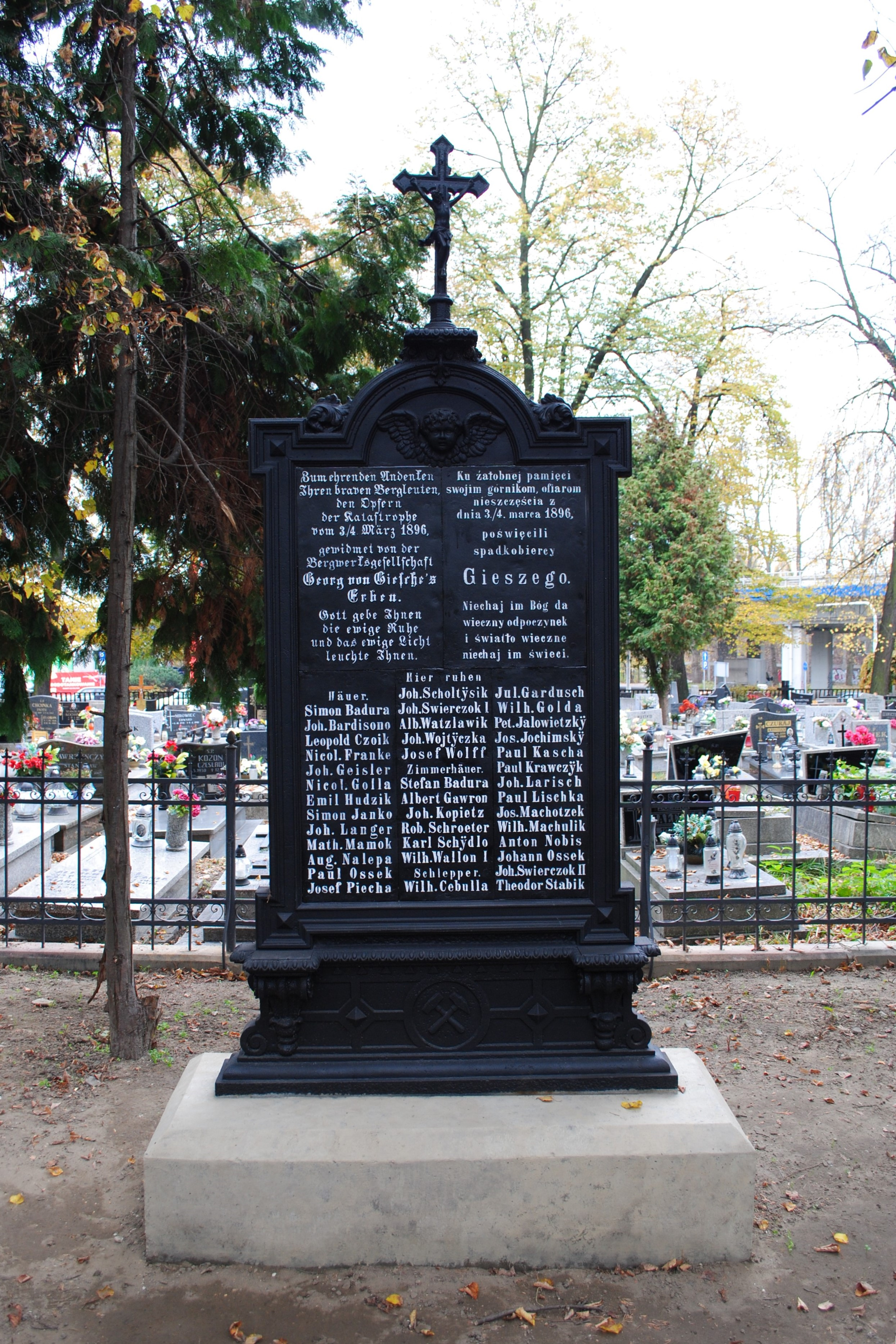
Mass grave of miners, victims of the disaster at the Kleofas Coal Mine of 1896, at the cemetery on Bracka Street

The first school in Załęże was established in 1827 in a rented cottage. At the beginning of the 1830s, 102 children attended it, of which about 15 did so regularly. The first teacher was Franciszek Zarębski. In 1883, Robert Wojtas, Ludwik Łabuz, and Bernard Szołtysik founded the Polish Reading Room, whose task was also to run an amateur theater. In 1884, the residents of Załęże watched Piotr Kołodziej's Pan fabrykant mioteł (The Broom Factory Owner) and Wycużnik (The Pensioner), as well as Władysław Ludwik Anczyc's Gorzałka (Vodka), at a local inn. One of the Polish Reading Room activists was Paulina Szołtysikówna.

After 1890, many workers' organizations operated in Załęże, including the Catholic Workers' Society, the Jedność Polish Catholic Society (founded in 1906; its president was, among others, Henryk Ciemięga), and the Aloysius Society. In 1893, a Theater Committee was established, which organized performances in the settlement. In addition, a branch of the Polish Socialist Party was established, initially led by Józef Biniszkiewicz. Franciszka Ciemięgowa was also an active social activist in Załęże. In 1906, she co-founded the Women's Reading Room, which gave rise to the Polish women's movement and the Polish Women's Society, established in 1918.

The local residents belonged to the parish community in Bogucice until a Roman Catholic parish was founded in Załęże in 1896; the construction of Church of St. Joseph began two years later. This was related to the events of the night of 3 to 4 March 1896, when the largest mining disaster in the history of Załęże took place. In the underground of the Cleophas Coal Mine, 104 workers died in a fire. Over 300 people from rescue teams from various mines participated in the rescue operation, including the Cleophas, Ferdinand, König, Myslowitz, and Giesche coal mines. During the funeral of the victims of the disaster, the parish priest of Bogucice, Father Ludwik Skowronek, made a vow to build a church in Załęże.

In 1895, a post and telecommunications office began operating in Załęże, and at the end of the 19th century, a narrow-gauge tram line was built. The section of the line between Hajduki Górne, Załęże, and Katowice was opened on 7 September 1899. It was part of the line from Mysłowice to Bytom, built by the Oberschlesische Dampfstrassenbahnen company.

=== Interwar period and World War II ===
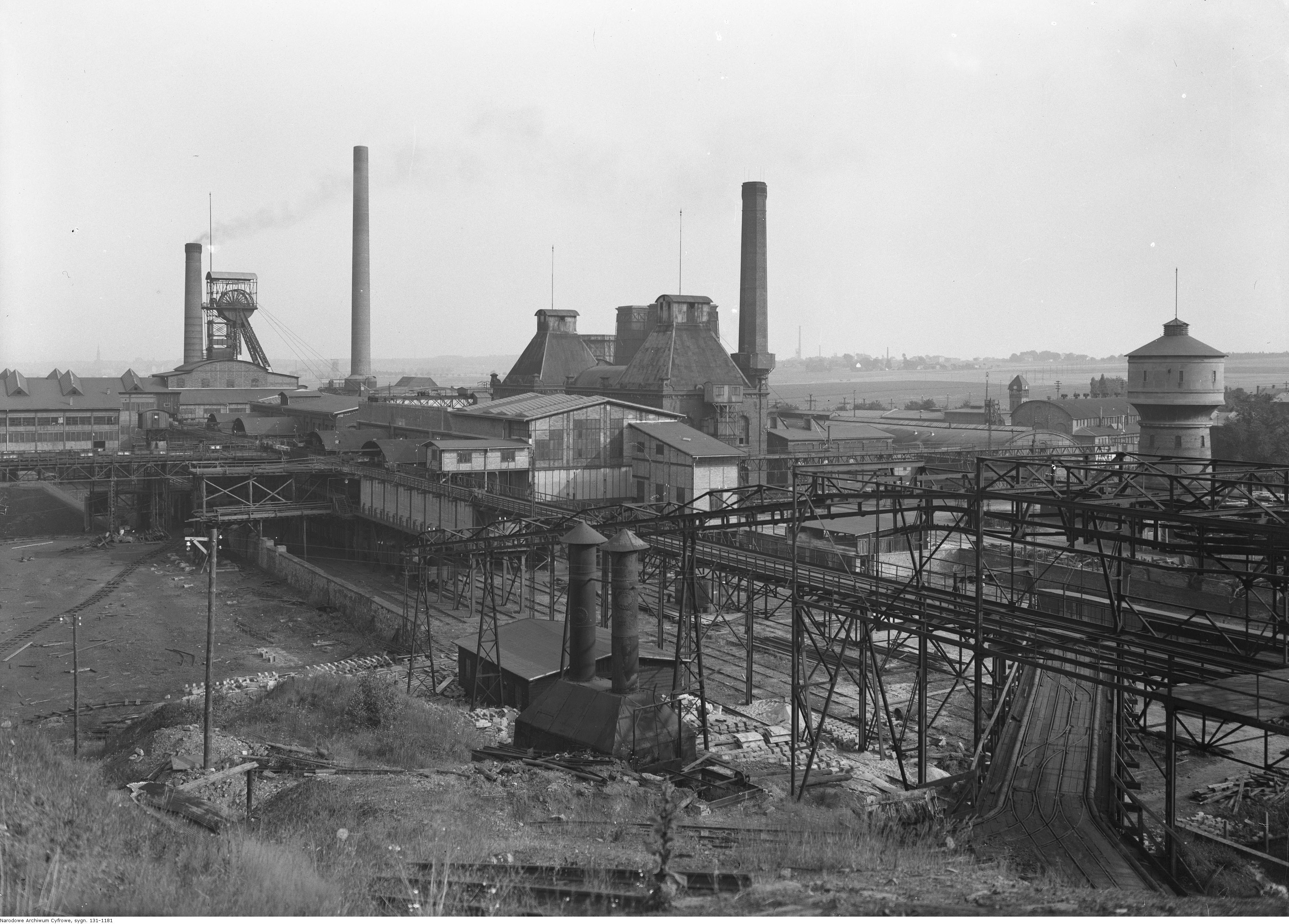
Kleofas Coal Mine in 1927

On the night of 16 to 17 August 1919, the First Silesian Uprising broke out. Maksymilian Iksal's order was answered, among others, by a unit of the Polish Military Organization of Upper Silesia from Dąb, whose members clashed with the Germans on 17 August near the cemetery on what later became Bracka Street, resulting in several insurgents being wounded. They were forced to retreat to Sosnowiec, where Teodor Dudek, the organizer of the Polish Military Organization structures in Załęże, was staying. During the Second Silesian Uprising, which broke out in mid-August 1920, Załęże was under the control of the insurgents. Polish flags were displayed on the mine towers and buildings.

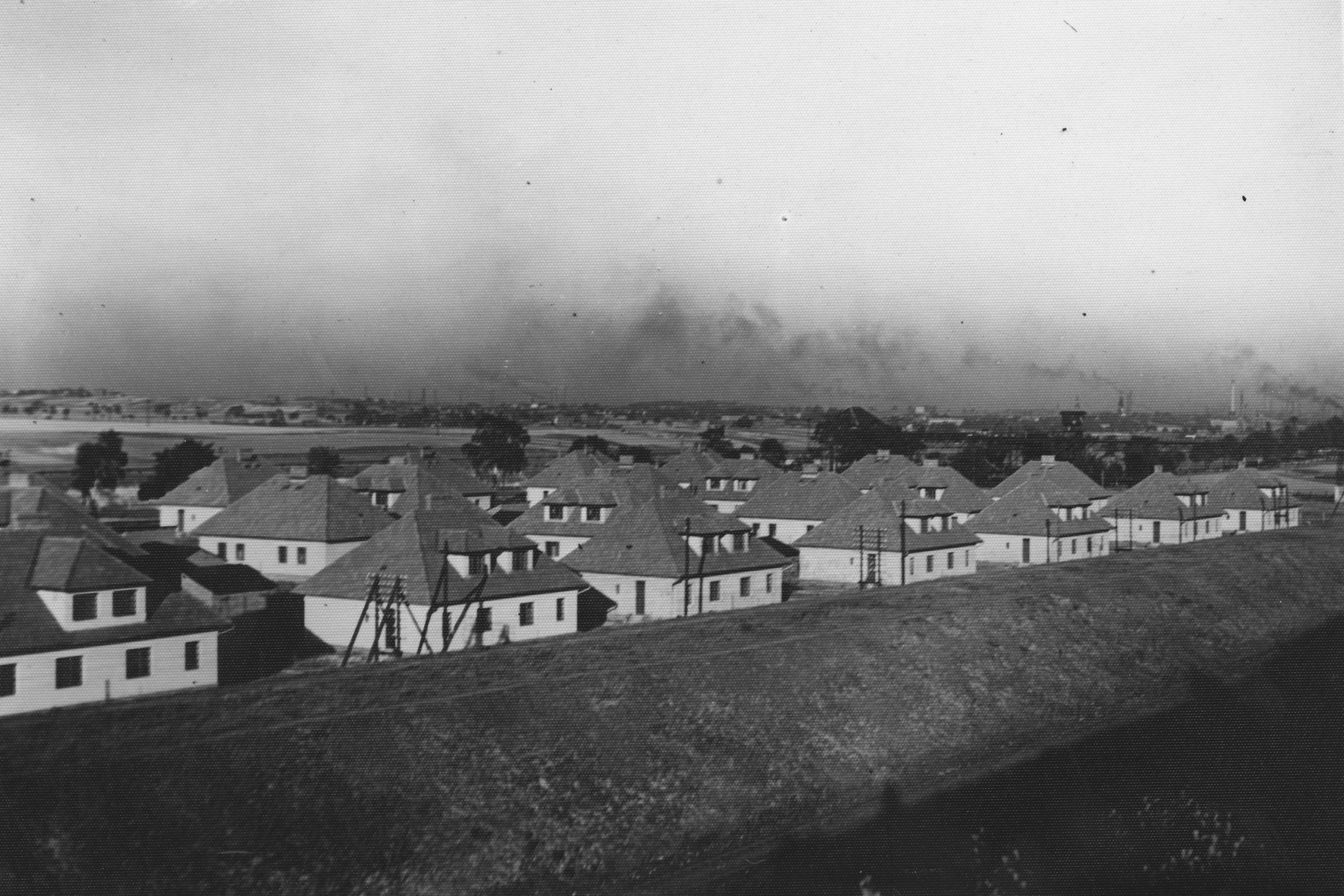
Osiedle Kolonia Mościckiego in a photograph from the interwar period

During the plebiscite held on 20 March 1921, in the gmina and manor area of Załęże, 5,043 people (54.4% of valid votes) voted to remain in the Weimar Republic, while 4,223 people (45.6% of votes) voted to join Poland. During the Third Silesian Uprising, Załęże was also under the control of the insurgents, and an attack on Katowice took place from there on 3 May 1921. The Załęże company fought its way all the way to Góra Świętej Anny, engaging in battles with the Germans near Zalesie and Sławięcice on 1 and 2 June 1921. Five insurgents from the company were killed in the fighting: Ziętek, Pałka, Kłakus, Szopa, and Slipina, and 14 were wounded.

Gmina Załęże, together with the eastern part of Upper Silesia, was granted to Poland. On 22 June 1922, the Polish Armed Forces entered Załęże through a prepared triumphal gate with a banner reading: "Polish soldier! We welcome you to the blood-soaked land of Silesia. We pay tribute to the homeland and to you for your deeds in the name of a sacred cause".

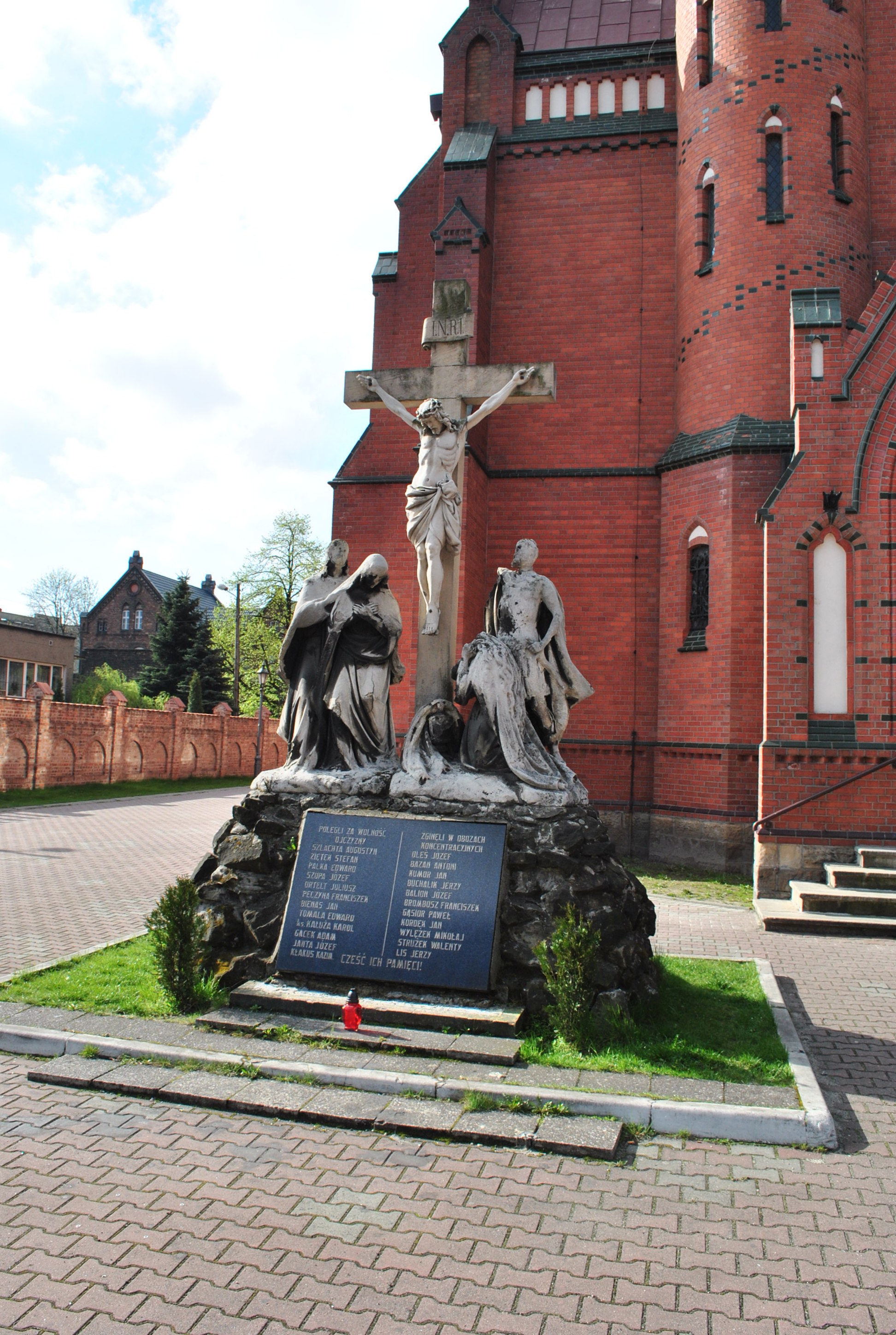
Monument commemorating the residents of Załęże who died in Nazi concentration camps, located at the Załęże church (2014)

On 15 October 1924, Załęże, together with Bogucice, Brynów, Dąb, Ligota, and Zawodzie, was incorporated into Katowice as a district of the city.

From September 1923, the Polish Catholic press was established in Załęże. For several years, Niedziela Częstochowska and Gość Niedzielny were printed there. In the interwar period, singing societies were also active. The following male choirs were established at that time: the Ignacy Paderewski Choir (1920–1923), the Fryderyk Chopin Choir (in 1923), the Echo Choir (at the Kleofas Coal Mine in 1929), and the mixed Stanisław Moniuszko Choir (in 1930).

On post-industrial wasteland near the Kleofas Coal Mine, Osiedle Kolonia Mościckiego was built between 1927 and 1928. Land for the construction of the housing estate was purchased from the Giesche company. Originally, it consisted of 63 semi-detached houses, and in 1932, the colony was inhabited by 851 people. In 1929, the Municipal Asylum was opened, where the poorest inhabitants of Katowice were resettled. During the Great Depression, the Kleofas Coal Mine was shut down between 1932 and 1938. At that time, illegal coal mining was carried out in bootleg mines in the area of F. Bocheński and Kochłowicka streets. Before the outbreak of World War II, Załęże was of strategic importance, which is why a military road was built there (now part of Kochłowicka Street; later the A4 motorway), connecting Katowice with an ammunition depot.

After the Germans occupied the district and incorporated it into the Third Reich in 1939, Załęże became part of the Kattowitz-West district. During World War II, prisoners of war from the camp in Łambinowice were employed in the Kleofas Coal Mine. There were also two other labor camps where Poles, Russians, French, Dutch, Ukrainians, and Italians were held. They worked in the Eminencja Coal Mine and the Baildon Steelworks.

On 24 January 1945, the district was bombed and then occupied by the Red Army from 27 January to 31 May 1945. During the Soviet occupation, 104 families, considered German, were displaced, and many residents were sent to labor camps. The Germans were gradually replaced by Romani people who were resettled from Śródmieście to Załęże. The Soviets also devastated the children's hospital, established by the Germans in 1943 after the conversion of the Municipal Asylum. It was rebuilt after the war on the initiative of Stanisław Roszek and the Sisters of St. Hedwig. Many residents of Załęże died during the occupation, including Scout Master Jerzy Lis and Father Karol Kałuża, who was born in Załęże. In 1945, a memorial cross with a plaque was unveiled in the church courtyard in their honor.

=== Post-war years ===
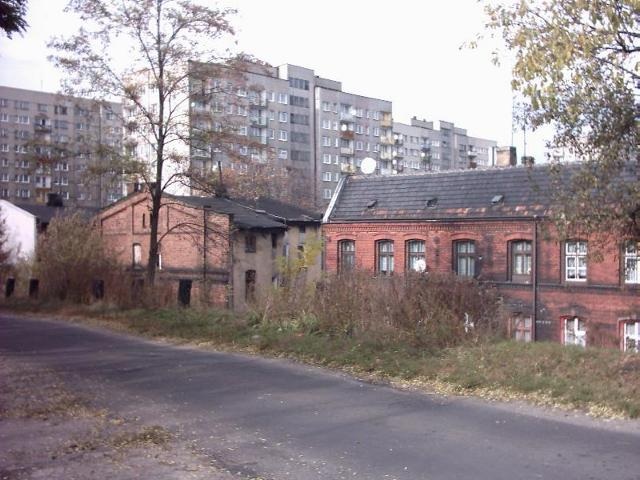
Part of Osiedle Janasa-Ondraszka in a photograph from 2005; view from P. Pośpiech Street

On 9 February 1945, coal mining resumed at the Kleofas Coal Mine, and normal production at the Baildon Steelworks resumed in April of the same year. In 1957, the Katowice Załęże railway station was built and began operating from 1966.

During the Polish People's Republic, housing construction intensified in Załęże due to the further development of industry in the area. In the 1960s, the Kleofas Coal Mine housing estate and the Gonar Mining Tools Factory were built in Obroki, while Osiedle Janasa-Ondraszka was built at the turn of the 1970s and 1980s. Two 11-story blocks of flats were also built in the area of Wiśniowa Street. The housing estates were inhabited mainly by workers from the Kleofas Coal Mine and the Baildon Steelworks. In 1976, construction began on Osiedle Witosa on the site of the Finnish houses in Załęska Hałda.

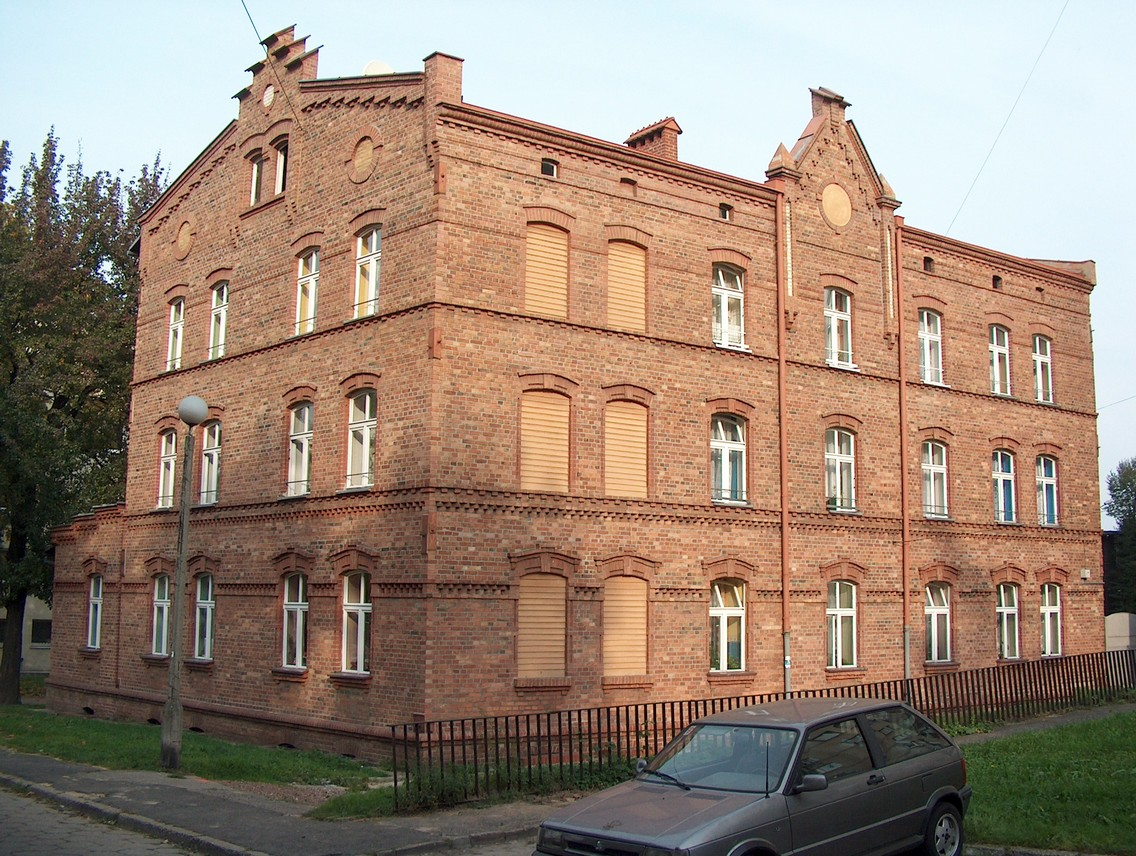
Tenement at 9 Ondraszek Street in 2007, renovated as part of the scaled-back "Załęże 2000" program

On 1 January 1992, 22 Auxiliary Local Government Units were established in Katowice, as a result of which the former territory of Gmina Załęże was divided into three of them: Osiedle Witosa (originally called Osiedle Załęska Hałda; the area of Osiedle Witosa estate and Obroki), Załęska Hałda-Brynów (the Załęska Hałda area), and Załęże.

Since the 1990s, as a result of economic restructuring, all major plants in the former municipality of Załęże have been closed or their operations reduced, leading to an increase in social problems. At that time, a plan was developed to revitalize the degraded district. In 1991, the authorities of Katowice launched the "Załęże 2000" program. On 19 June 1995, the Katowice City Council adopted the "Action Plan for the Modernization and Rehabilitation of the Załęże District in Katowice". It envisaged spatial modernization, economic regeneration, and a change in the image of Załęże; these measures were to be implemented by the Katowice authorities over several decades.

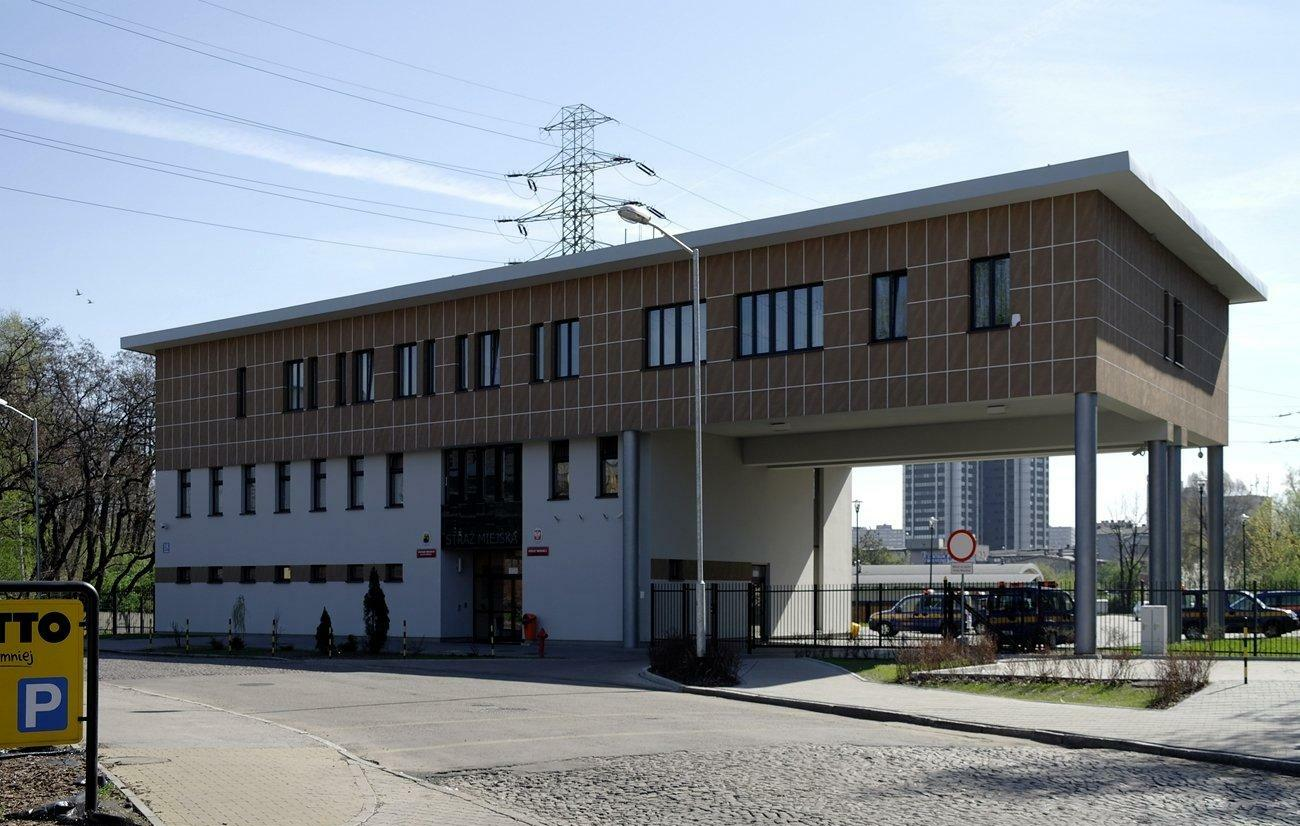
Headquarters of the Katowice Municipal Guard, built in 2011

A part of Drogowa Trasa Średnicowa was built in 1995 along the Rawa river, parallel to Gliwicka Street, from Bracka Street to the border with Chorzów. In subsequent years, F. Bocheński Street was connected to the A4 motorway and Drogowa Trasa Średnicowa. The modernization of the most important street in Załęże – Gliwicka Street – also started. The modernization of the central and last section of the street scheduled for renovation, from P. Pośpiech Street to Bracka Street, began on 12 May 2007. The works included, among others, the modernization of technical infrastructure, the replacement of 1,135 m of double tram tracks, and the reconstruction of the road surface and sidewalks. During this time, traffic on the street was completely suspended. The modernization was completed on 15 November 2008, when tram services resumed on the street.

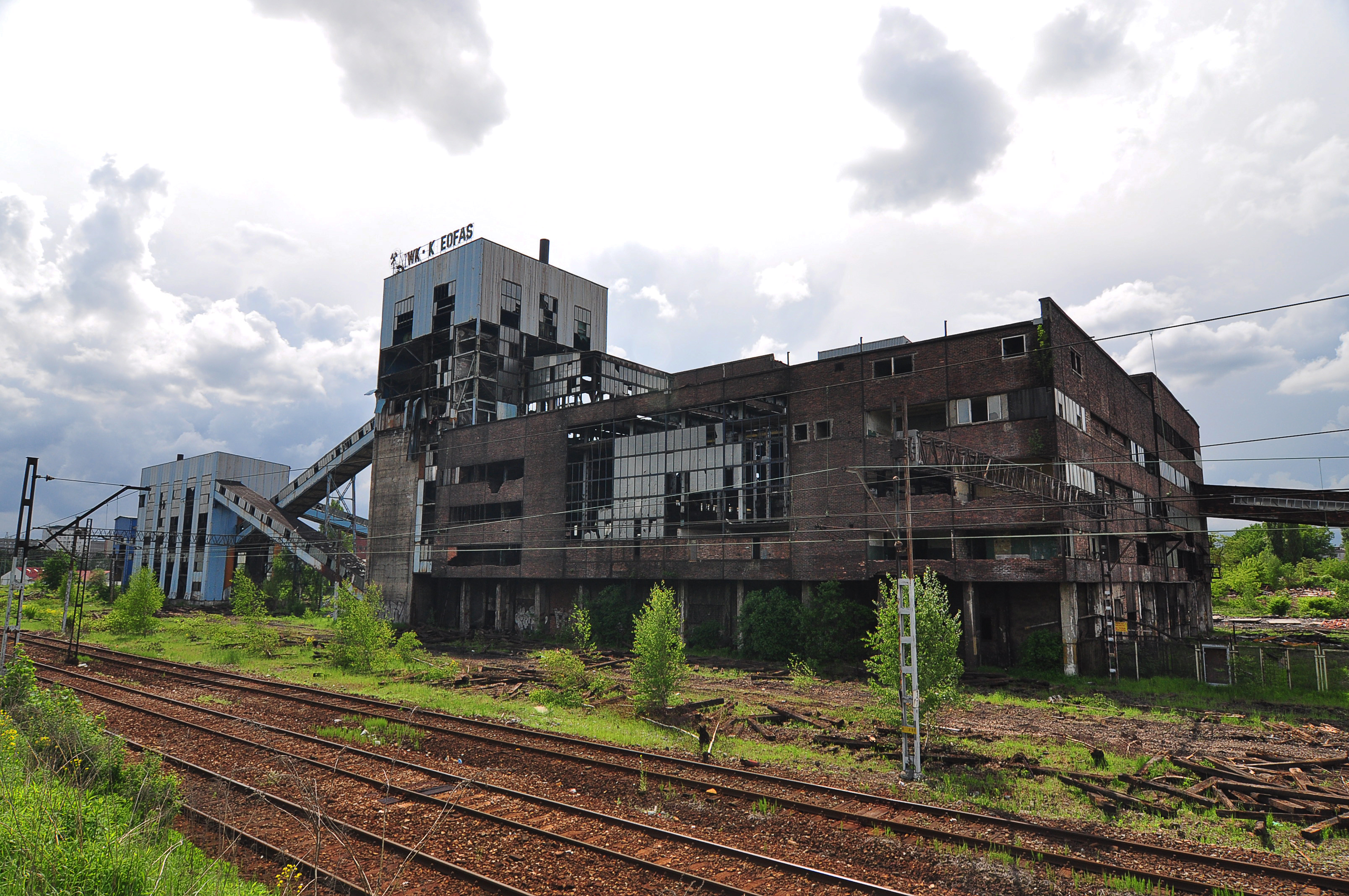
Buildings of the already closed Kleofas Coal Mine in 2013

Earlier, on 16 May 2001, the Baildon Steelworks joint-stock company was declared bankrupt, and it was removed from the list of entrepreneurs on 9 March 2016. Mining at the Katowice-Kleofas mine ended in November 2004.

The central part of Załęże was included in the "Local Revitalization Program for the City of Katowice for 2007–2013," under which two tenements (at 148 and 150 Gliwicka Street) were modernized, the sewage system was rebuilt, and a sports field and playground were built at the Juliusz Słowacki Primary School No. 22. As part of the program, the new headquarters of the Municipal Police was opened on Żelazna Street in 2011.

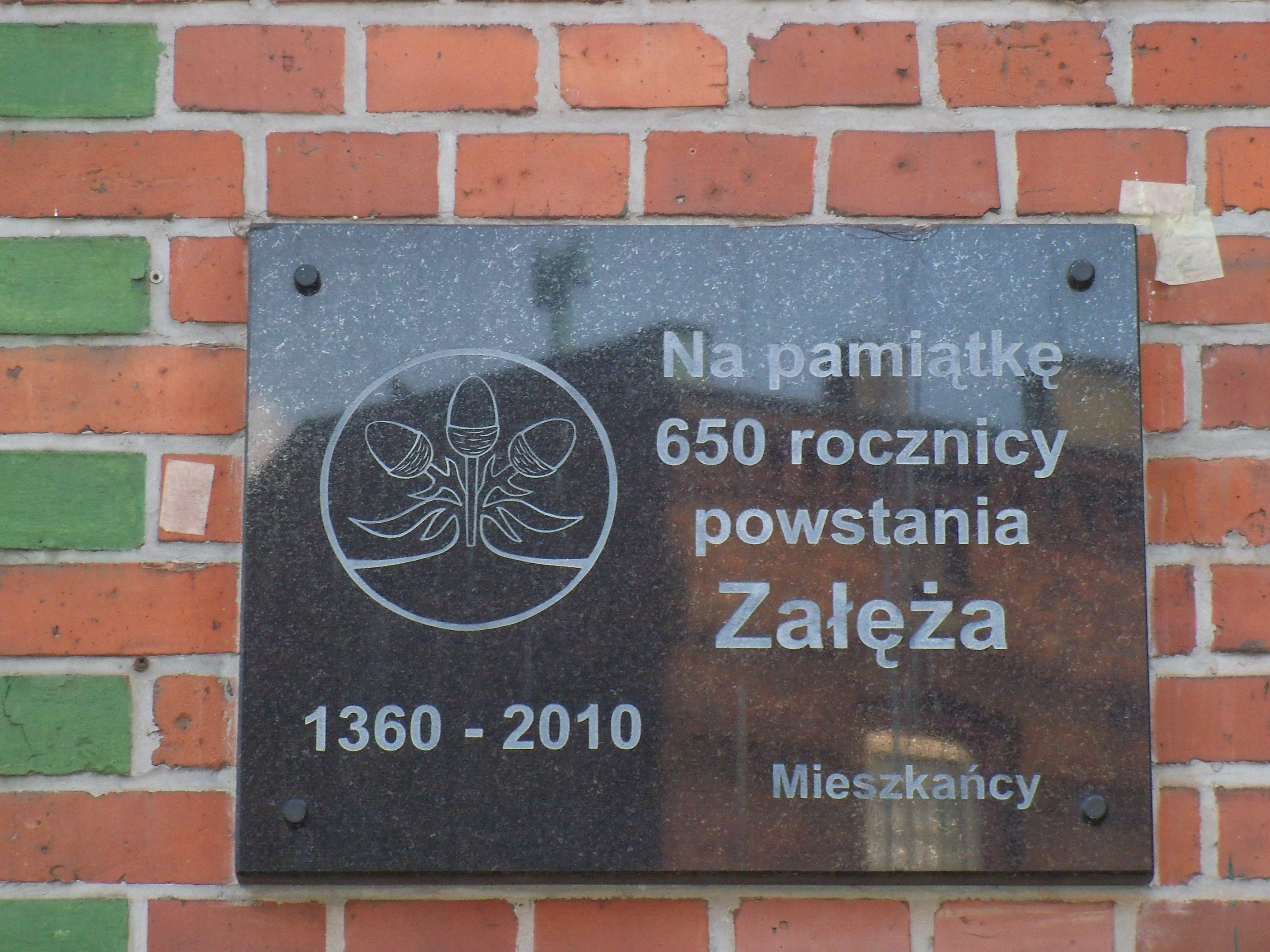
Plaque commemorating the 650th anniversary of the founding of Załęże, which is in fact the anniversary of the first mention of it

In 2010, the district celebrated the 650th anniversary of the founding of Załęże on the date of its first mention, 15 December 1360. The celebrations began on 17 November 2010 with a Mass in the local church. There were also lectures on Załęże, a commemorative plaque was unveiled on the facade of the former municipal office building, and local artistic groups performed.

Thanks to the collection of a sufficient number of signatures, the Katowice City Council adopted the Statute of Auxiliary Unit No. 7 Załęże on 15 October 2014. On 29 October 2014, the first-ever elections to the Auxiliary Unit Council were ordered; they took place on 1 March 2015.

== Demography ==
Population structure in Załęże by gender and age (as of 31 December 2015)
Period/Number of inhabitants	Pre-working age (0–18 years)	Working age (18–60/65 years)	Post-working age (over 60/65 years)	Total
Total	1,725	6,154	2,006	9,885
Women	823	3,003	1,428	5,254
Men	902	3,151	578	4,631
Femininity ratio	91	95	247	113

The demographic development of present-day Załęże has undergone significant changes over the last few hundred years. It was modified in particular by the rapid population growth since the end of the 18th century, caused by the development of the industrial sector (mainly coal mining and metallurgy), as well as the decline in population caused by World War II and increased emigration since the 1990s. In 1783, Załęże had 189 inhabitants (including 21 peasants, 20 smallholders, and a miller) and was the second most populous village in present-day Katowice, after Bogucice. The population grew rapidly and exceeded 10,000 at the turn of the 19th and 20th centuries, which was related to industrial development. In 1910, 18,428 people lived in Załęże, 1,845 of whom resided in the manor area. Since 1988, there has been a steady decline in the population.

In 1988, Załęże had a population of 15,530. At that time, young and middle-aged people predominated, especially those aged 15–29 and 30–44. The number of residents in the district continued to decline – in 1997, the number of people living in Załęże was approximately 13,200, and the population density at that time was 3,899 people per km². As of 31 December 2007, 11,569 people lived in Załęże, which accounted for 3.7% of the inhabitants of Katowice. The population density at that time was 3,417 people per km², which was higher than the density for the entire city – 1,916 people per km². At that time, the age structure was relatively even, with a slight predominance of people aged 15 and 29 and a significantly lower proportion of people aged up to 14. In 2010, 18.2% of Załęże's residents were of pre-working age, 64.8% were of working age, and the proportion of people of post-working age reached 17.0%. On 31 December 2015, the population of Załęże was 9,885.

According to a survey conducted in 2011 on a group of 44 people, 45.5% of the surveyed residents of Załęże declared themselves to be Silesians (the highest percentage among all districts of Katowice), 36.4% declared themselves to be Poles, 15.9% declared themselves to be both Silesians and Poles, and 2.3% were of other nationalities.

Sources: 1783; 1817; 1825 (another source gives the same population figure for 1823); 1840 (another source gives the same population figure for 1845); 1855; 1861; 1867; 1871; 1875; 1885 (another source gives 3,530 people); 1890 (another source gives 4,773 people); 1895; 1900; 1905; 1910 (according to another source, 15,150 people lived in Załęże at that time); 1924; 1936; 1938; 1947; 1988; 1994; 2005; 2010; 2015; 2020.

== Politics and administration ==
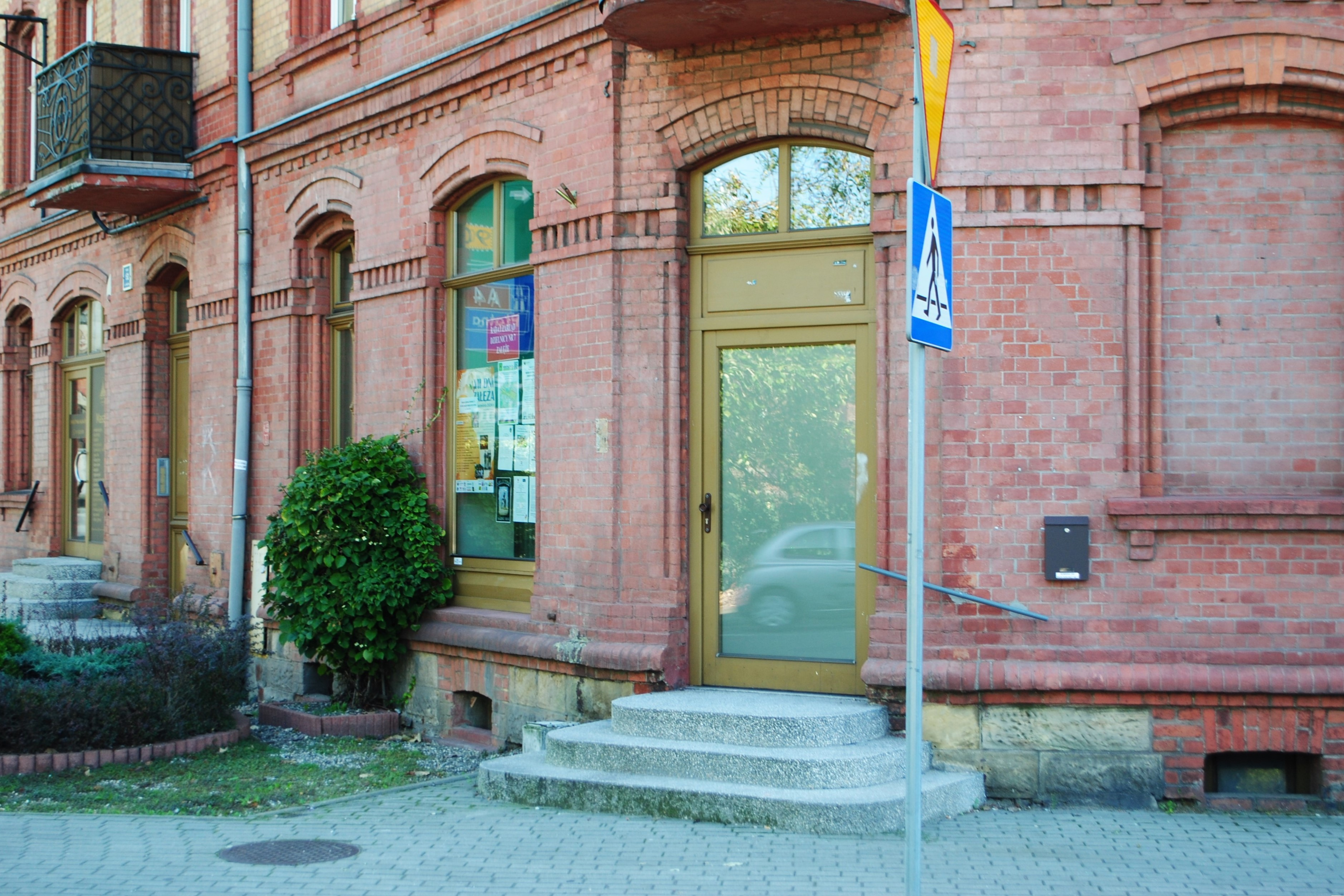
Headquarters of the Council and Board of District No. 7 Załęże at 150 Gliwicka Street

District No. 7 Załęże is one of 22 districts of Katowice, constituting an auxiliary unit of the gmina. It was established by a resolution of the City Council of Katowice as local government unit No. 7 on 1 January 1992. According to Resolution No. XLVI/449/97 of the Katowice City Council of 29 September 1997, Załęże is a statutory district in the group of northern districts.

District No. 7 Załęże has a statute in force since 25 November 2021, while the first elections to the then Auxiliary Unit Council took place on 1 March 2015. The District Council consists of 15 councilors elected for a 4-year term. The executive body of the council is the District Management Board. The District Council's headquarters are located at 150 Gliwicka Street, at the intersection with Pokoju Street. The chairman of the District Council for the 2019–2025 term was Andrzej Karol, while the chairman of the Management Board was Krystian Zybura.

In elections to the Katowice City Council, Załęże belongs to constituency No. 4 (Osiedle Tysiąclecia, Załęże, Osiedle Witosa, Załęska Hałda-Brynów). In the 2024–2029 term, it had five representatives in the City Council. In 2010, the residents of Załęże belonged to five general constituencies (12, 13, 14, 15, and 16) and one in the Care and Treatment Facility at 78 Gliwicka Street (district 165).

As of November 2024, there is one administrative institution with supra-county jurisdiction in Załęże – the Voivodeship Road Transport Inspectorate, located at 38 Żeliwna Street.

=== History ===
Colored version of the coat of arms found on the seals of Załęże from 1873 and from 1875 to 1920

Historically, the present-day Załęże became part of Silesia in the late 12th or early 13th century. In 1360, Nicholas II sold the area of present-day Katowice – Bogucice, Jaźwce, Roździeń, Szopienice, and Załęże – to Otto of Pilcza, retaining sovereignty over them. The owners of Załęże changed frequently, including on 22 February 1536, when Stanisław Salomon, a councilor from Kraków, purchased the Mysłowice estate from his relative Jan Turzon, which included Roździeń, Szopienice, Bogucice, and Załęże. After Stanisław Salomon's death in 1546, these lands were taken over by his widow, Anna, and then by Stanisław's brother, Mikołaj Salomon.

At the beginning of the 18th century, Załęże remained a free village. The first known village administrator (sołtys) of Załęże was Stanisław in 1598, followed in later years by his sons Bartłomiej and Piotr. In 1686, Grześ Grządziel was the village administrator. Until the emancipation of the peasants, village heads were entirely dependent on the village owner. From the late 18th century, the village heads of Załęże were: Józef Badura from 1771 to 1772, Jakub Sekuła in 1794, and Mikołaj Kurzeja from 1832 to 1838. In present-day Katowice, the position of hereditary village heads was strong until they were bought out by the landowners of those areas in the 18th century. Their position was evidence of the medieval colonization of these lands under German law. Village leaders were also well paid. From the first half of the 17th century, the village leaders of Załęże owned meadows, ponds, houses with farmsteads, and hop fields. They also had a large independence from the owners of the estates.

In the 19th century, Załęże had many owners. From 1779, the village was owned by Karol Wachowski, from whom Fryderyk von Wrochem purchased it in 1807. Shortly after, he moved there with his family and lived in Załęże until his death in 1837. The subsequent owners of the Załęże estate were: Loebel Freund (1840–1845), Karol Neumann, Ernest Georges de la Tour (around 1845–1856), Count Magnus von Moltke (1858) and his heirs (1865). In 1883, the Załęże estate was purchased by the Georg von Giesches Erben company.

After 1742, when the Kingdom of Prussia took over most of Silesia after the Silesian Wars, counties were established in Upper Silesia, including Bytom and Pszczyna. When Oppeln was created after the Napoleonic Wars, the borders of some counties were also changed in 1818. At that time, Załęże, among others, was incorporated into the Bytom County. On 27 March 1873, a new Katowice County was separated from Bytom County, due to the rapid increase in the population of that area. Katowice became the county seat, and the newly established unit also included the gmina and manor of Załęże.

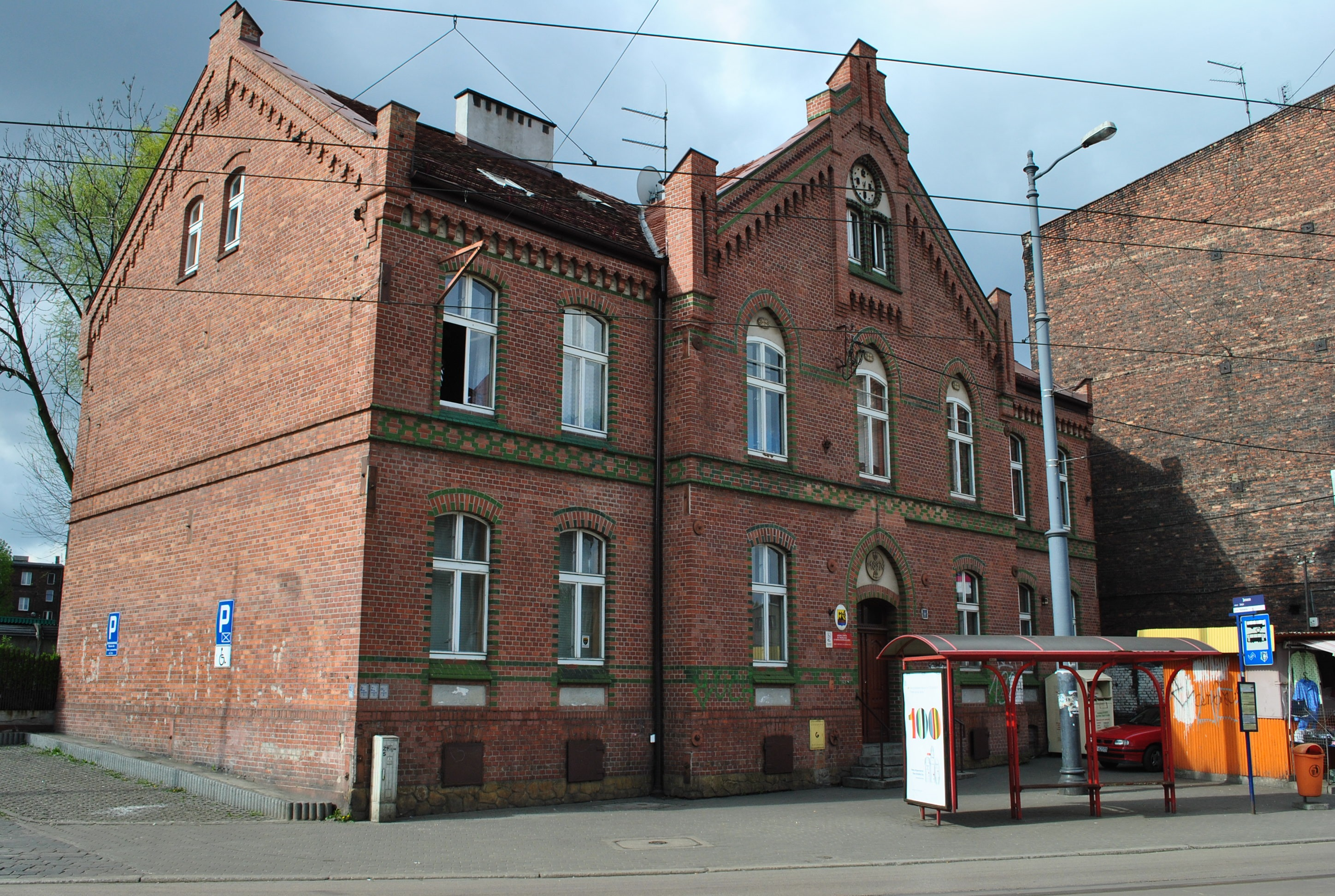
Former office building of Gmina Załęże at 102 Gliwicka Street, dating back to 1897

The gmina areas of Załęże were divided into three parts, forming specific enclaves within the compact manor land. The fields were located around the folwark and near Załęska Hałda. The gmina's headquarters were located at 102 Gliwicka Street.

In 1856, a new ordinance on the administration of rural gminas was introduced. That year, Jan Oleś was the head of Gmina Załęże. In subsequent years, the heads were, in succession: Mateusz Stanisławowski (1868–1878), Adolf Heller (1879–1882), Józef Boronowski (1883–1888), Józef Wolny (1889–1896), Gracjan Laxy (1896–1900), Marcin Knopp (1901–1909), Bruno Michaelis (1910–1922; held the title of mayor), and Lorenz Widuch (1922–1924; held the title of mayor).

On 1 January 1874, new administrative units known as administrative districts (German: Amtsbezirk), were established in the six eastern provinces of Prussia, including Upper Silesia; they comprised several gminas or manorial estates. In the Katowice County, to which Załęże belonged at the time, the Załęże administrative district was established on 31 May 1874, comprising the rural Gmina Załęże and the Załęże manorial estate.

In 1922, after the incorporation of part of Upper Silesia into Poland, the gmina and manorial area of Załęże remained part of the Katowice County, and shortly after the establishment of the autonomous Silesian Voivodeship, the manorial areas were incorporated into the neighboring gminas. The manorial areas in the Katowice County were abolished on 30 June 1924, and a day later they came under the control of the gminas. Under an act of the Silesian Parliament of 15 July of the same year, it was decided to incorporate, among others, Gmina Załęże into Katowice. The act came into force on 15 October 1924. Before the incorporation, the gmina had an area of 8.43 km² and was then the third largest gmina in Katowice at that time. In 1925, due to the expansion of the city's borders and the number of inhabitants, the City Council divided Katowice into districts, including District III Załęże-Dą.

Eugen Franz, a German political and social activist and deputy to the Sejm of the 1st, 2nd, and 3rd terms (Second Polish Republic), came from Załęże. Franz Johannes Rosumek, a German political activist born in Załęże, was also a member of the Sejm of the 1st, 2nd, and 3rd terms in the interwar period.

After Nazi Germany occupied Poland in 1939, the new authorities restored the official names of localities within Katowice to their pre-1922 status. On 3 February 1942, pursuant to a decree by the president of the Province of Upper Silesia, a new administrative division of the city was established. At that time, Załęże, along with Obroki and Bederowiec, was placed in the Kattowitz-West district. After the Polish authorities took over the administration of Katowice in 1945, the legal status as of 1 September 1939 was restored.

On 7 October 1954, Załęże was assigned to the Załęże-Śródmieście district. The seat of the Presidium of the District National Council was located in present-day Śródmieście, first at what was then 18 Armii Czerwonej Street, and later at 2 Freedom Square. This division was abolished in 1973.

=== Seal coat of arms ===
The oldest preserved seals of Załęże date back to 1723 and are known from the Carolinian Cadastre. The first coat of arms of Załęże is also known from this period. The seal from 1723 depicted the lette "Z" inscribed directly in the field. However, it was quickly forgotten, as on new seals made half a century later, already during the Kingdom of Prussia, it was replaced with a new one, and the coat of arms established at that time was used continuously until the end of the independent gmina's existence.

The central motif of Załęże's coat of arms was the natural world. On the seal from 1816, the coat of arms appears as a sprig with oak leaves and an acorn sprouting from the ground. The coat of arms on the seal from between 1836 and 1868 underwent modification: it depicts an oak shrub growing from the ground, topped with three acorns, with two small leaves between them. The coat of arms on the seal from 1873 and from 1875 to 1920 depicts an oak bush growing from the ground, topped by three acorns – one at the top and two on the sides – with two leaves at the bottom. The seal from the final years of the independent Gmina Załęże, from between 1921 and 1924, depicts further changes: an oak sapling growing from the ground, with an acorn protruding at the top and four leaves at the bottom.

== Economy ==
For many years, Załęże was an important center for mining and metallurgy, and prior to the 19th century, also for blacksmithing. As early as the Middle Ages, iron ore in the form of clay-rich limonite was mined in the Załęże region (especially in Załęska Hałda). Iron ore was still being extracted at the beginning of the 19th century – in 1840, 44 workers were employed at the mine, producing 5,000 tons of ore. In addition, refractory clay was mined on a small scale at that time.

The earliest record of a smithy in Załęże, which operated on the Rawa river, dates back to 29 February 1524. At that time, the then-owner of Załęże sold the village to Strzybnicki, and Master Jan of Załęże is listed as the seller (the term "master" may refer to a master blacksmith). A document of 17 August 1564 suggests that the smithy was not in operation. After a long hiatus, it was rebuilt in the 17th century. As late as 1728, it was mentioned in a record, and by 1735, a mill stood in its place. It operated until around 1855.

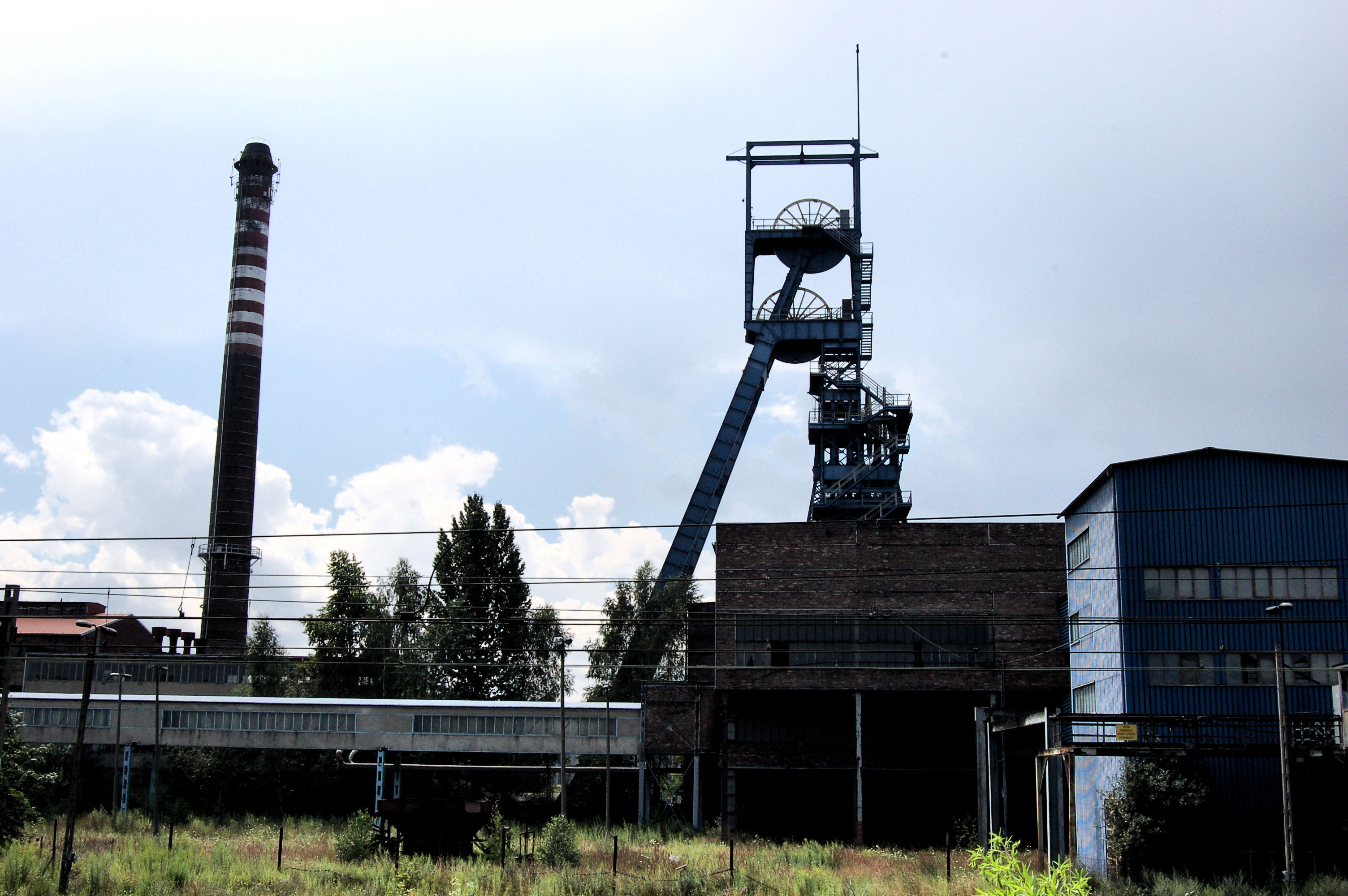
Buildings of the former Kleofas Coal Mine in 2008

The Charlotte Coal Mine was the first coal mine in Załęże and one of the oldest in present-day Katowice. It was granted a mining charter on 16 March 1792. It was in operation in 1789 and between 1823 and 1858. In 1858, it was incorporated into the Victor Coal Mine, which was granted a charter on 24 January 1838.

In 1840, Karl Godulla opened the Cleophas Coal Mine (later Kleofas), with Loebel Freund becoming a co-owner. It was larger than other mines of this type operating at the time in Gmina Załęże. The mine was granted a license on 15 July 1840 and approved on 21 July of the same year. From 1845, Karl Godulla was the sole owner, and after his death in 1848, Johanna von Schaffgotsch became the heiress to the facility. In 1852, 136 people worked at the Cleophas Coal Mine. At that time, five shafts were operational, and from the very beginning of the establishment's activity, the railway had been the main buyer of coal. In 1852, production amounted to 150,000 tons, of which the railway purchased 84,000. Pursuant to a decision by the Upper Silesian Mining Office in Tarnowskie Góry, the Cleophas and Eva mines were merged. In 1880, the Georg von Giesches Erben company purchased the plant, which was inactive at the time. In Obroki, work began on sinking new Walter (later Fortuna II) and Recke (Fortuna III) shafts, from which coal began to be mined as early as the 1880s, and somewhat later from the Frankenberg (Fortuna I) shaft. The Kleofas Coal Mine belonged to the Giesche joint-stock company from 1922. That same year, it produced 735,800 tons of coal with a workforce of 4,016 people. Between 1932 and 1938, it was temporarily shut down. After 1945, the Kleofas Coal Mine was nationalized and operated as part of the Katowice Coal Industry Union. In 1974, it was merged with the Gottwald Coal Mine, operating under that name until 1990. In 1996, the Kleofas mine was merged with the Katowice mine, forming the Katowice-Kleofas Coal Mine. In 2004, it was closed, and in 2014, most of its structures were demolished.

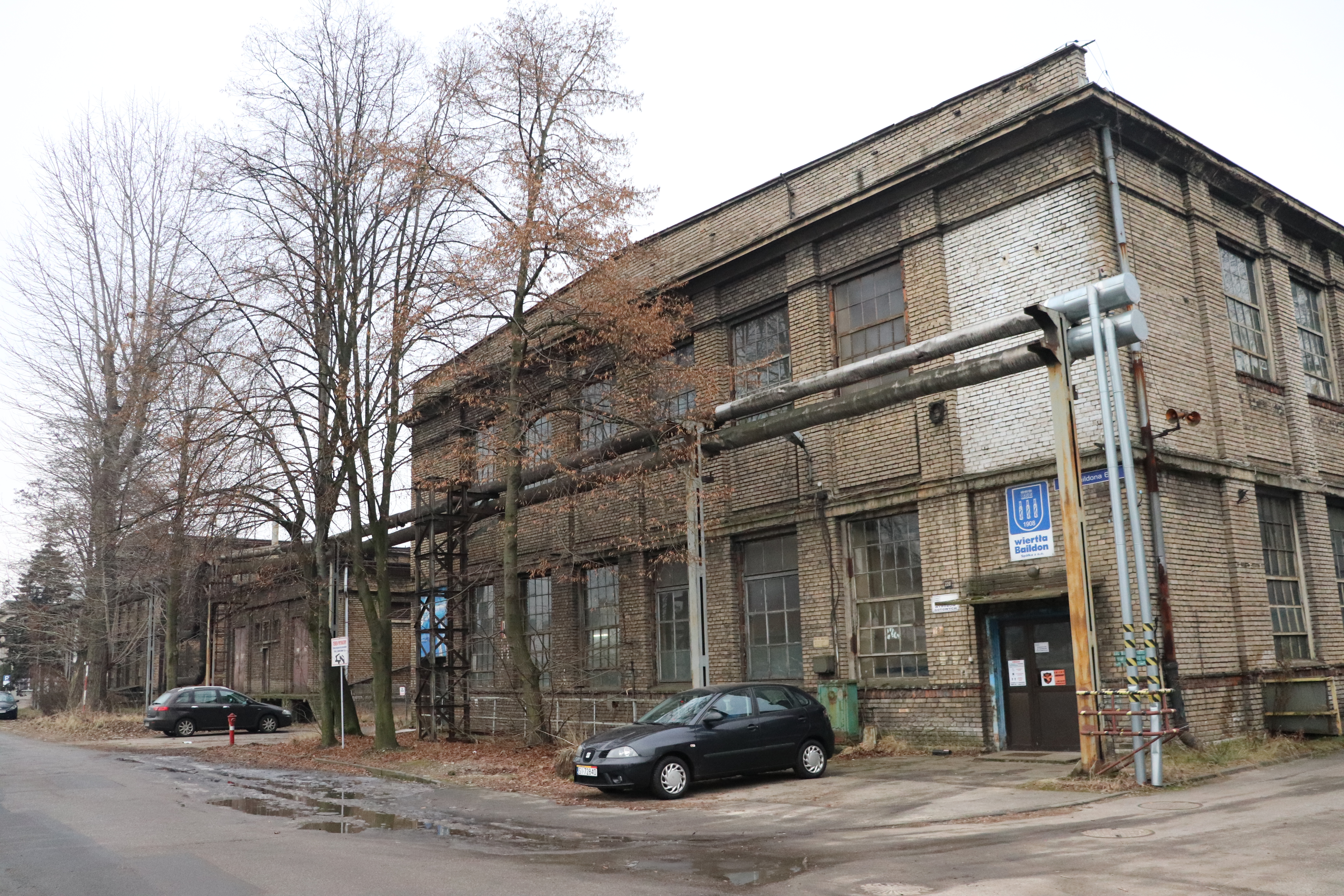
Part of the former Baildon Steelworks on the Załęże side – the Wiertła Baildon factory

The 19th century also saw the development of glass, iron, and zinc smelting. In the first half of the 19th century, the Victor Zinc Smelter (in 1840) and the Johanna Zinc Smelter began operations. The latter was established on the site of the former Saeman Glassworks, which had been founded in 1820 and operated for two years. The Victor Zinc Smelter was purchased on 19 October 1855 by the merchant Gustav von Kramsta. In 1823, the Baildon Steelworks was established on the border between Dąb and Załęże, which in later years had a significant impact on the development of both settlements. The plant was founded by John Baildon near a pond on the Rawa river, on the site of a former Załęże forge. For its time, it was a modern facility. The puddling method was used there, and a bar rolling mill was in operation. After John Baildon's death in 1846, the steelworks became the property of Józef Doms and Adolf Wenzel. It was inactive from 1863 to 1865, and in 1865, the plant was purchased by August Wilhelm Hegenscheidt, owner of a wire drawing mill in Gliwice. It was then that the "BHH" trademark began to be used for the steelworks' products. The Baildon Steelworks declared bankruptcy in mid-May 2001, and new industrial companies were established on its premises.

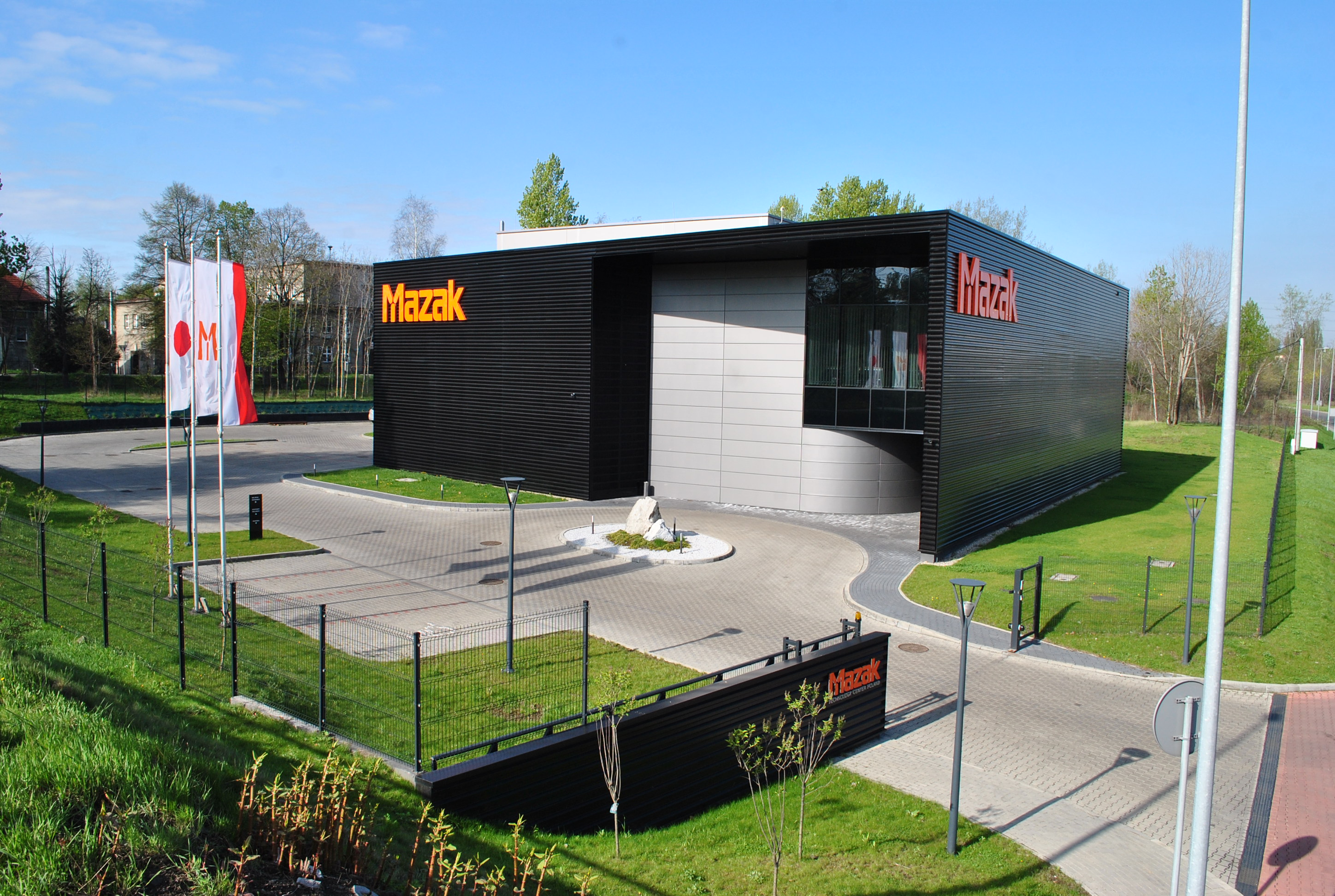
Yamazaki Mazak Technology Center at Trasa im. Nikodema i Józefa Renców (2014)

In 1867, Dawid Czwiklitzer founded a soap and cologne factory in Katowice on what would later become Wawelska Street. In subsequent years, the factory was relocated in its entirety to Załęże, at present-day 7 P. Pośpiech Street. By 1925, it employed 25 people. From 31 January 1945, the First Steam-Powered Soap Factory operated as part of the Chemical Industry Union of the Coal Basin, and on 7 December of the same year, it was nationalized and incorporated into the Fat Industry Union. In 1956, it was transformed into the Katowice Fat Industry Plant, and in 1981 into the Katowice Pollena-Savona Household Chemistry Plant. Today, this plant is one of the largest domestic manufacturers of cosmetics and household chemicals.

In 1913, a company manufacturing mining machinery and equipment was established on Tokarska Street. In 1933, it was taken over by Gustaw Różycki, and the name of the establishment was changed to the Machinery Factory, Iron and Non-Ferrous Metal Foundry – MOJ. The plant was expanded, and in August 1937, it began mass production of the first Polish motorcycle based on its own design – the MOJ 130, which was produced until 1939. To this day, the plant manufactures, among other things, machinery for the mining industry.

On 22 March 2012, the Yamazaki Mazak Technology Center, a manufacturer of metal-cutting machine tools, opened on Nikodem and Józef Reniec Avenue. It is dedicated to implementing new solutions in metalworking technology and training specialists in this field. Other major industrial facilities operating in Załęże as of November 2024 include: Sandvik Polska – Katowice Branch (7 J. Pukowca Street) and Baildonit Węgliki Spiekane (28 Bracka Street; engaged in the production of cemented carbides).

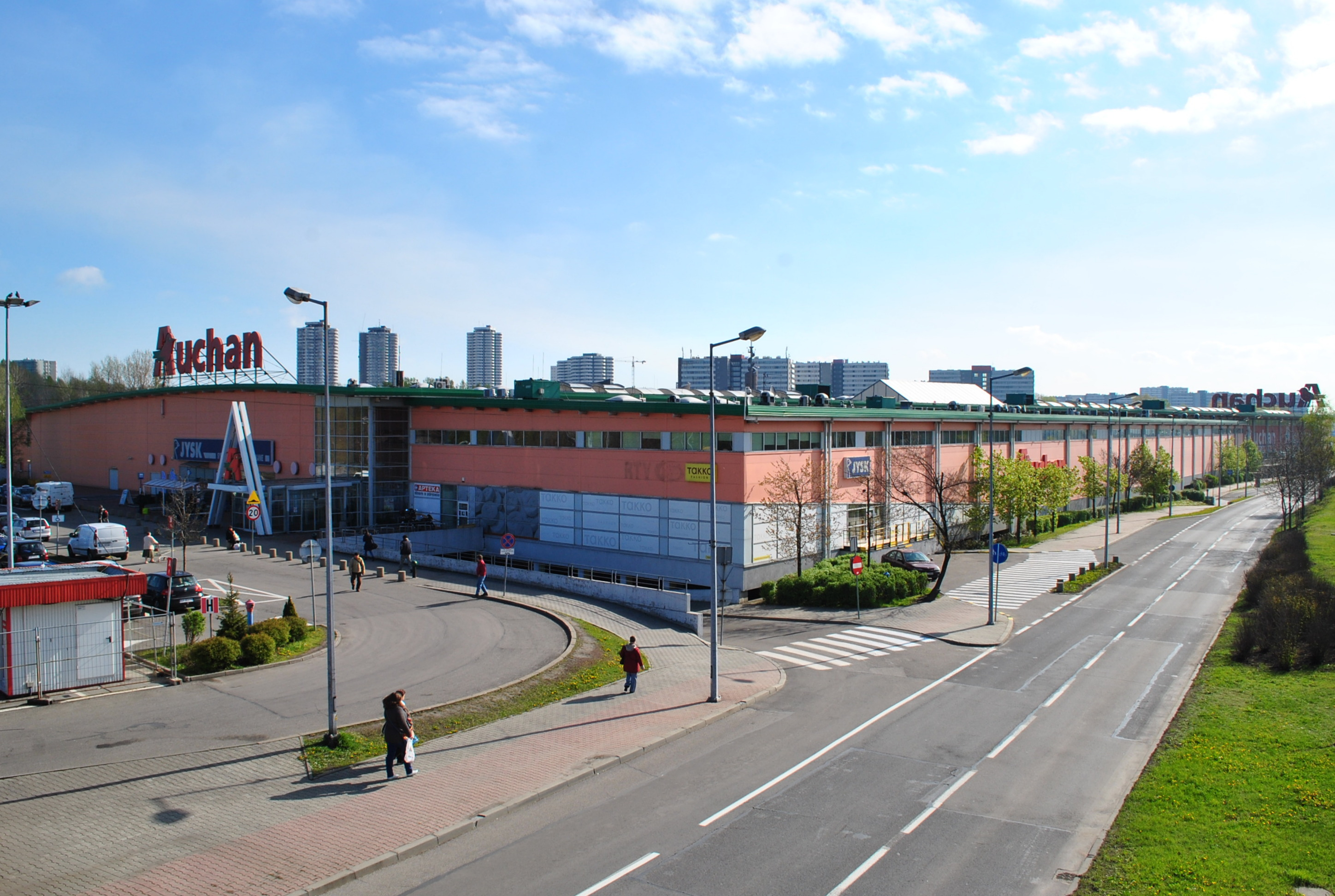
Auchan Katowice Shopping Center at Nikodem and Józef Reniec Avenue (2014)

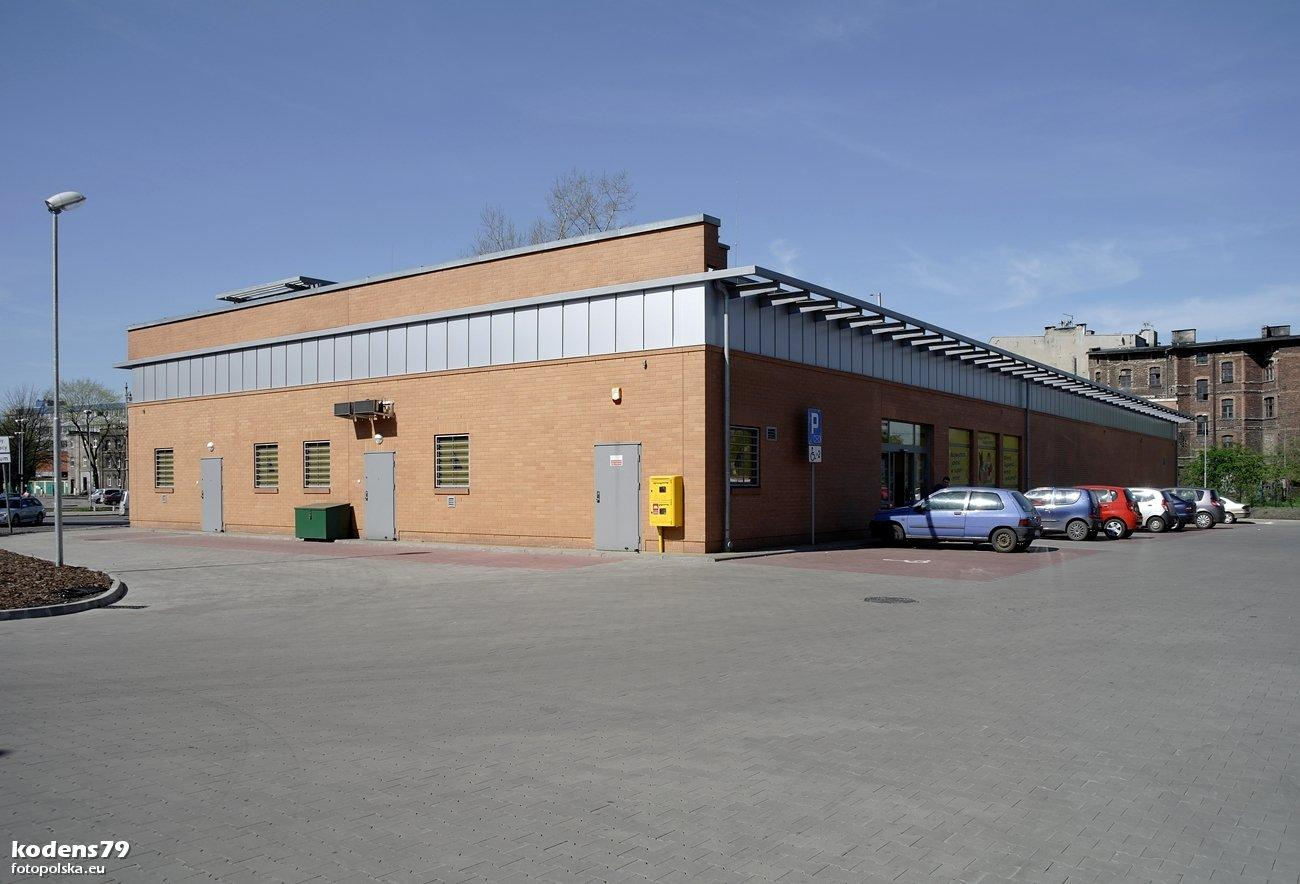
Netto store (23 Żelazna Street)

With Poland’s economic transformation after 1989, the service sector developed in Załęże, especially in the southern part of the district along F. Bocheński, J. Pukowiec, and Żeliwna streets. This area does not yet have a fully developed function or land-use structure, as it served industrial purposes in the past and is now mostly commercial and service-oriented.

There are three local service centers in Załęże, the level of development of which varies significantly depending on the size of the area they serve and their origins:

- Gliwicka Street between T. Szewczenki and P. Pośpiech streets (5,530 residents in 2007 within a 500 m radius) – services: retail, kindergarten, primary school, library, church, and public transport stops,
- J. Londzin Square and Gliwicka, F. Bocheński, and M. Wolski streets (3,525 residents in 2007 within a 500 m radius) – services: retail, kindergarten, primary school, recreational facilities, and public transport stops,
- Gliwicka Street between Wiśniowa and John Paul II streets (4,549 residents in 2007 within a 500 m radius) – services: retail, kindergarten, sports and recreational facilities, and public transport stops.

As of July 2022, the following stores are located in Załęże:

- Auchan Katowice Shopping Center (30 Nikodem and Józef Reniec Avenue) – a shopping center with a hypermarket and 30 retail outlets, with an area of over 11,000 m², opened on 1 December 2000,
- Społem Katowice (152 Gliwicka Street),
- Biedronka (117 Gliwicka Street),
- Netto (23 Żelazna Street).

At the end of 2013, 1,408 business entities with their registered offices in Załęże were registered in the REGON system (3.1% of all companies in Katowice), of which 1,309 were micro-enterprises (127 entities per 1,000 residents). At the end of 2013, there were 589 registered unemployed residents living in Załęże, which at the time accounted for 5.7% of the district's population.

== Technical infrastructure ==
The main sources of water for the residents of Załęże are surface water intakes on the Vistula (Goczałkowice Lake) and the Soła (Czanieckie Lake). Water from the Water Treatment Plant is distributed via main and distribution water mains. A 1,400-mm-diameter transmission pipeline of the western trunk line runs through Załęże, connecting the Murcki equalizing reservoir with the Bytków reservoir. Water supply is managed by the Upper Silesian Waterworks Company and Katowice Waterworks.

The water supply system in Załęże was established thanks to the Cleophas Coal Mine (later Kleofas), when a highly productive aquifer was discovered during the drilling of the mine's main shaft. Initially, the Georg von Giesches Erben company built a pipeline to supply water to Załęże as compensation for the lowering of the groundwater level, and this system was extended very close to the borders of what was then Katowice. The water supply system in the city was put into operation on 26 September 1886. In 1901, a water main with a diameter of 200/250 mm was built, running from Bytków through Dąb and Załęże to Hajduki. This main supplied water from the flooded ore mine in Dąbrówka Wielka, purchased by Katowice together with other gminas on 25 March 1895. Water began to be supplied on 1 January 1896, and at the same time, cooperation with the Cleophas Coal Mine was terminated.

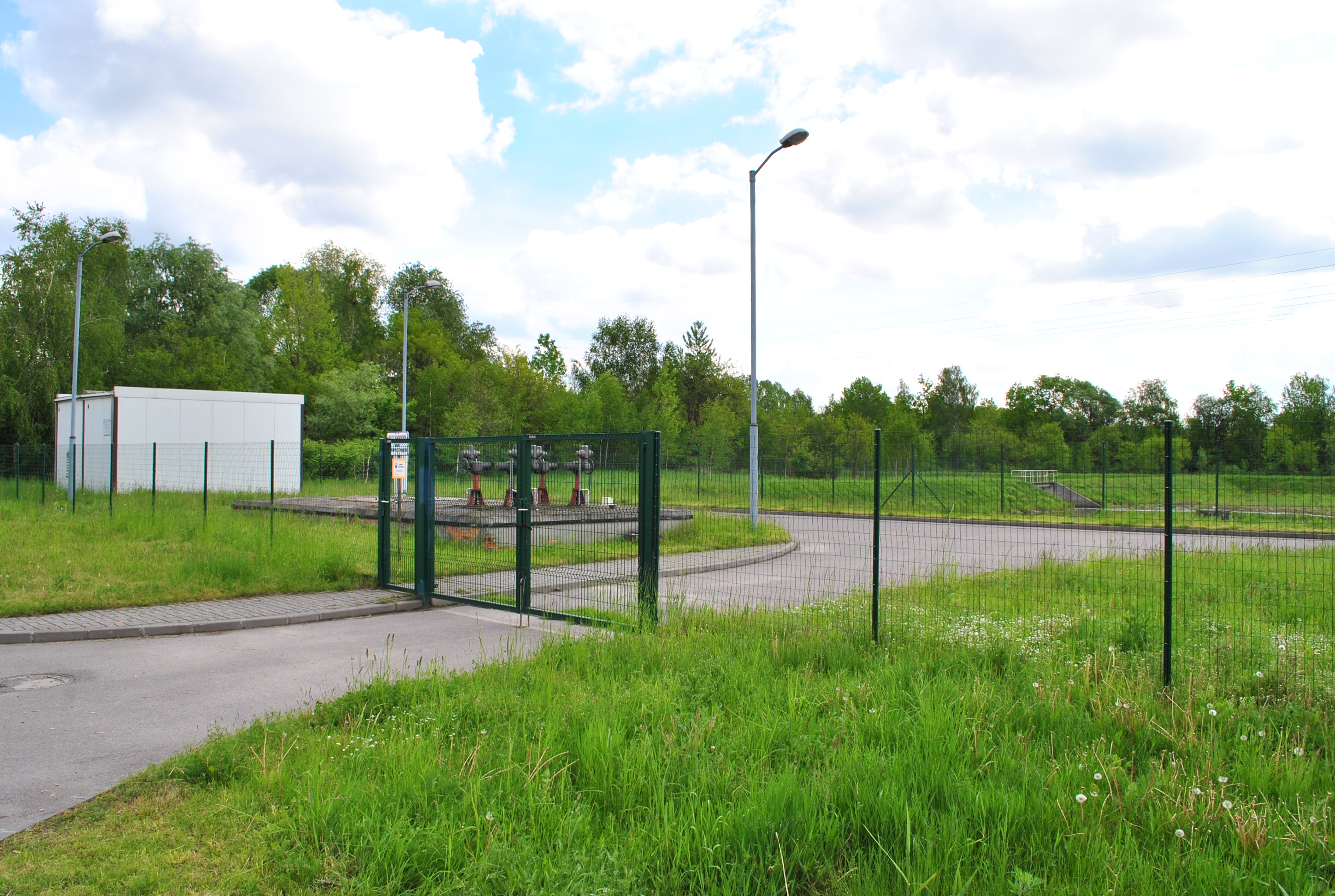
Infrastructure of the sewage pumping station on Żeliwna Street (2014)

The county water main in Załęże ran along the present-day Żelazna Street, while it did not reach Załęska Hałda. but it did not extend as far as Załęska Hałda. The water supply from the mine was discontinued in 1907. In 1937, a 400/350/300 mm water main was laid connecting the Dąb pumping station with Załęże, the Wujek Coal Mine, Ligota, Ochojec, and Piotrowice. It was a county-wide network supplying water from the treatment plant in Maczki, drawing from the Biała Przemsza river.

The sewer system in Załęże is managed by Katowice Waterworks. The vast majority of the district lies within the catchment area of the Centrum-Gigablok wastewater treatment plant, which receives combined sewer runoff. In the area of Gliwicka Street, it is in poor technical condition. Osiedle Kolonia Mościckiego, on the other hand, is located within the catchment area of the Klimzowiec treatment plant. The district also has a sewage pumping station, which is managed by Katowice Waterworks.

The first sewer system in Załęże was built between 1907 and 1908. It did not extend to the Załęska Hałda, but it did reach Obroki, specifically the Cleophas (Kleofas) mining settlement. A distribution network was built at that time, with a main collector running along the present-day Gliwicka Street. The sewage treatment plant was built on the Rawa river, on the eastern side of what is now Żeliwna Street, and consisted of three settling tanks.

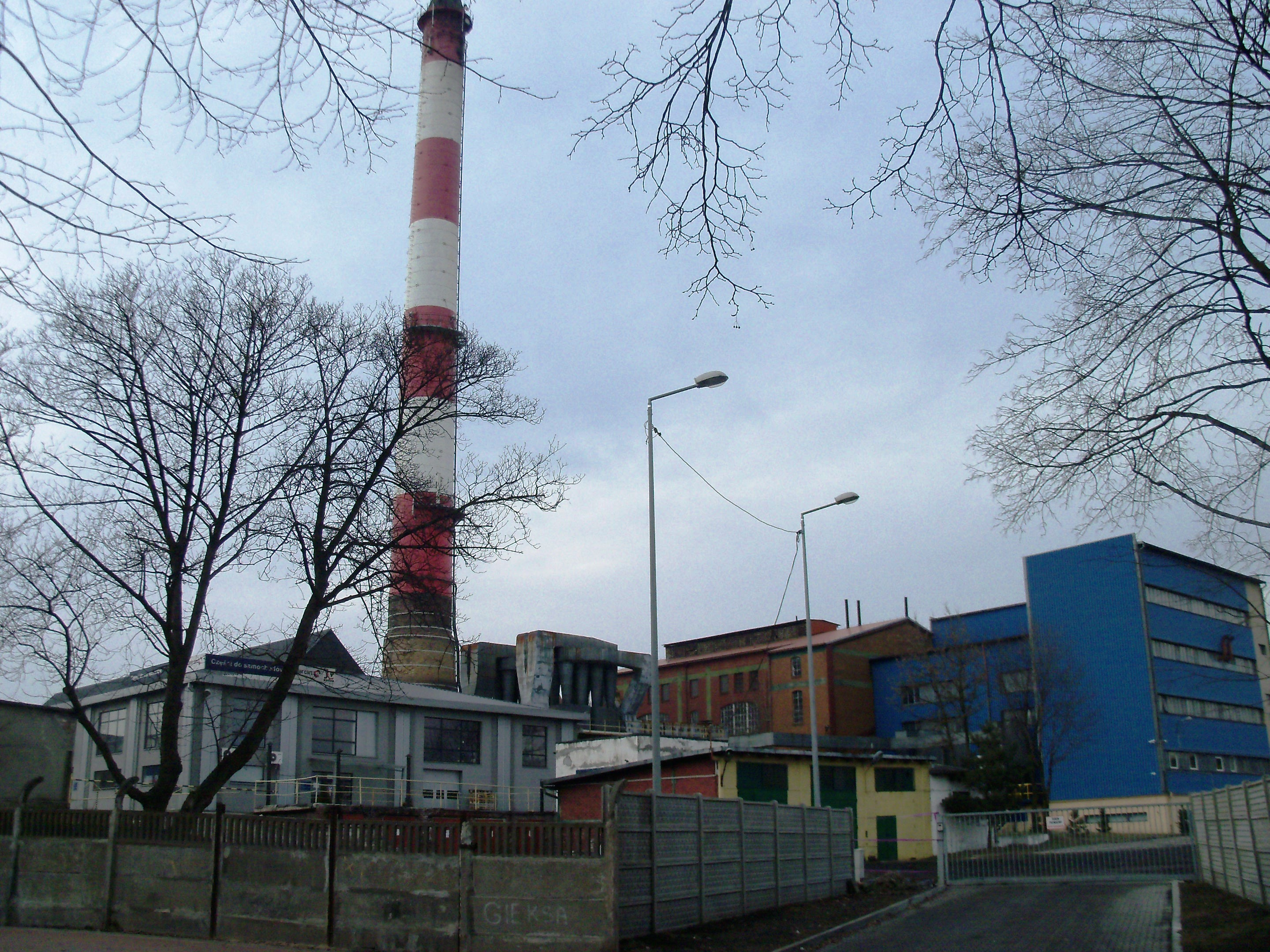
Heating plant at the Kleofas Coal Mine, seen from Obroki Street (2011)

Electricity is supplied to the residents of Załęże via a 110-kV high-voltage grid, which is transmitted through substations. On the outskirts of Załęże, on Bracka Street, there is the Załęże substation with a voltage level of 110/6 kV. This network is managed by the Tauron group. The average electricity consumption per household in Katowice was 865.7 kWh in 2006.

The district heating supply mainly serves buildings constructed after 1945. The western part of Załęże was connected to the Dalkia heating plant (formerly the District Heating Plant) – Section 8 Kleofas at 77 Obroki Street in Osiedle Witosa. Its capacity in 2007 was 42.8 MW, and it ceased operations in April 2022. The eastern part of Załęże (mainly Osiedle Janasa-Ondraszka) is also connected to the heating plant at 60 Siemianowicka Street, managed by Tauron Ciepło.

Natural gas is supplied to Załęże via high-pressure and medium-pressure pipelines. At 3 J. Pukowiec Street, there is a branch of Polish Gas Company – the Katowice Gas Works – as well as a first-stage pressure-reducing and metering station on F. Bocheński Street, with a capacity of 6,000 m³/h.

== Transport ==
=== Road transport ===
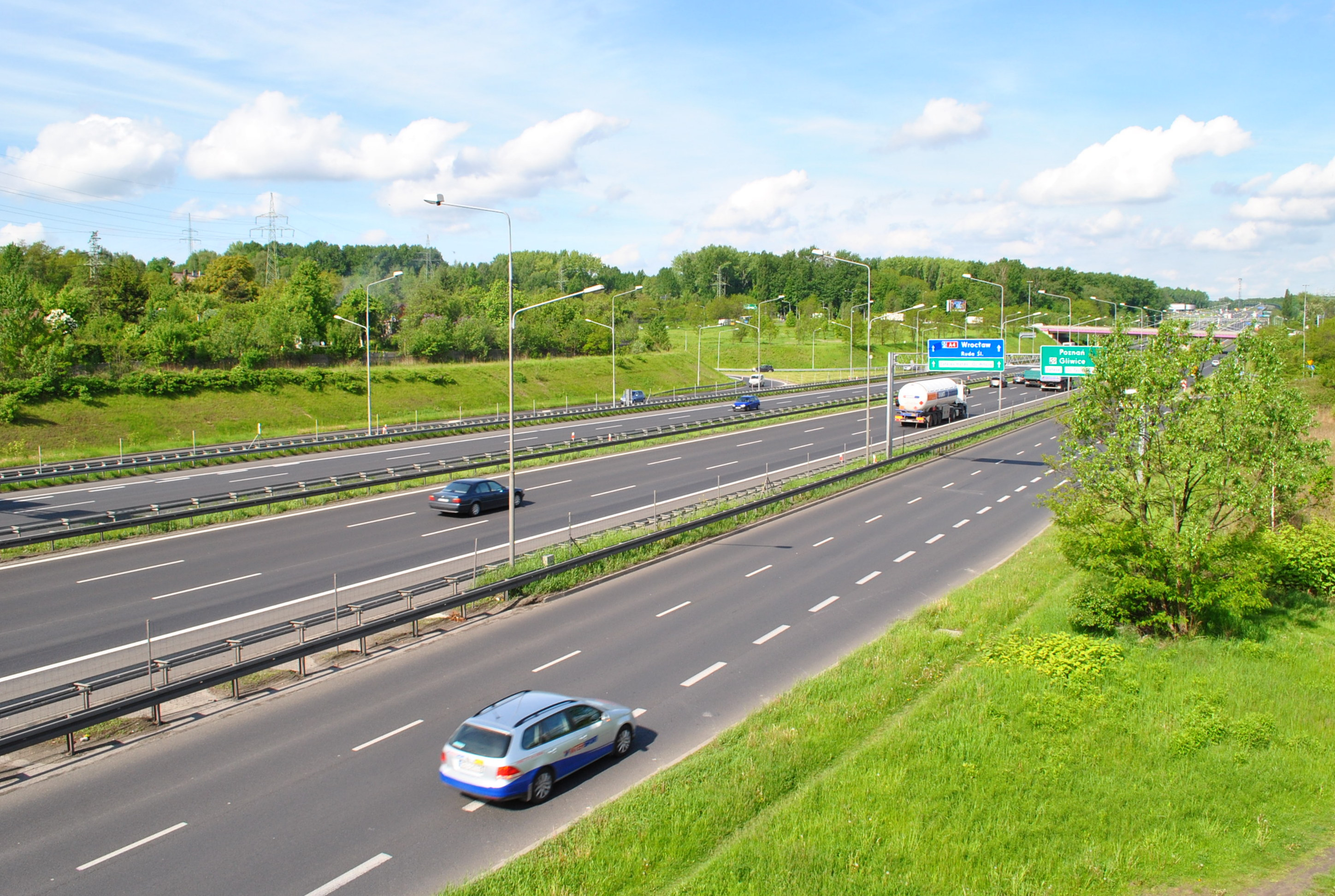
A4 motorway on the border of Załęże and Załęska Hałda-Brynów, near Żeliwna Street (2014)

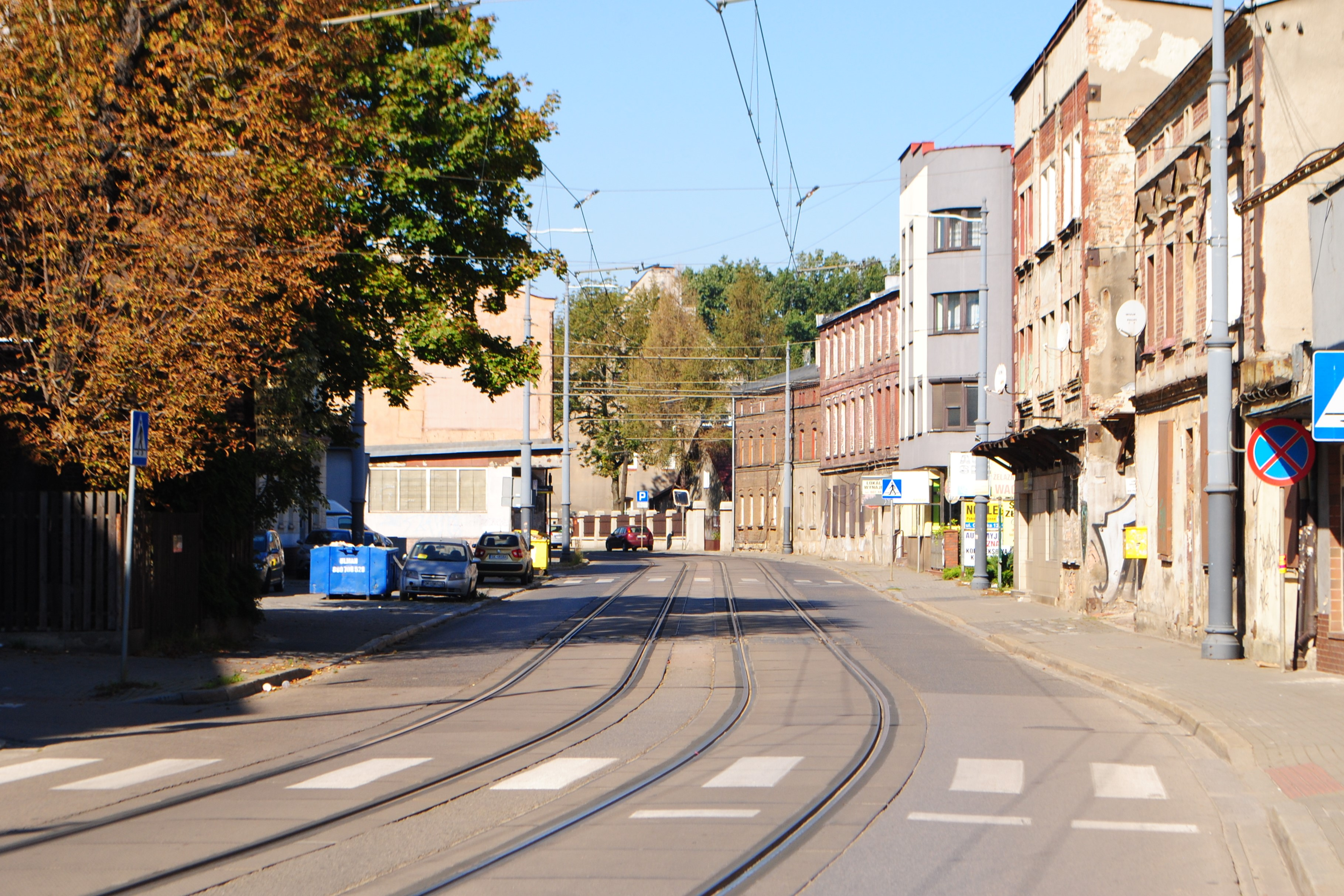
Part of Gliwicka Street near T. Szewczenka Street; view towards Chorzów (2024)

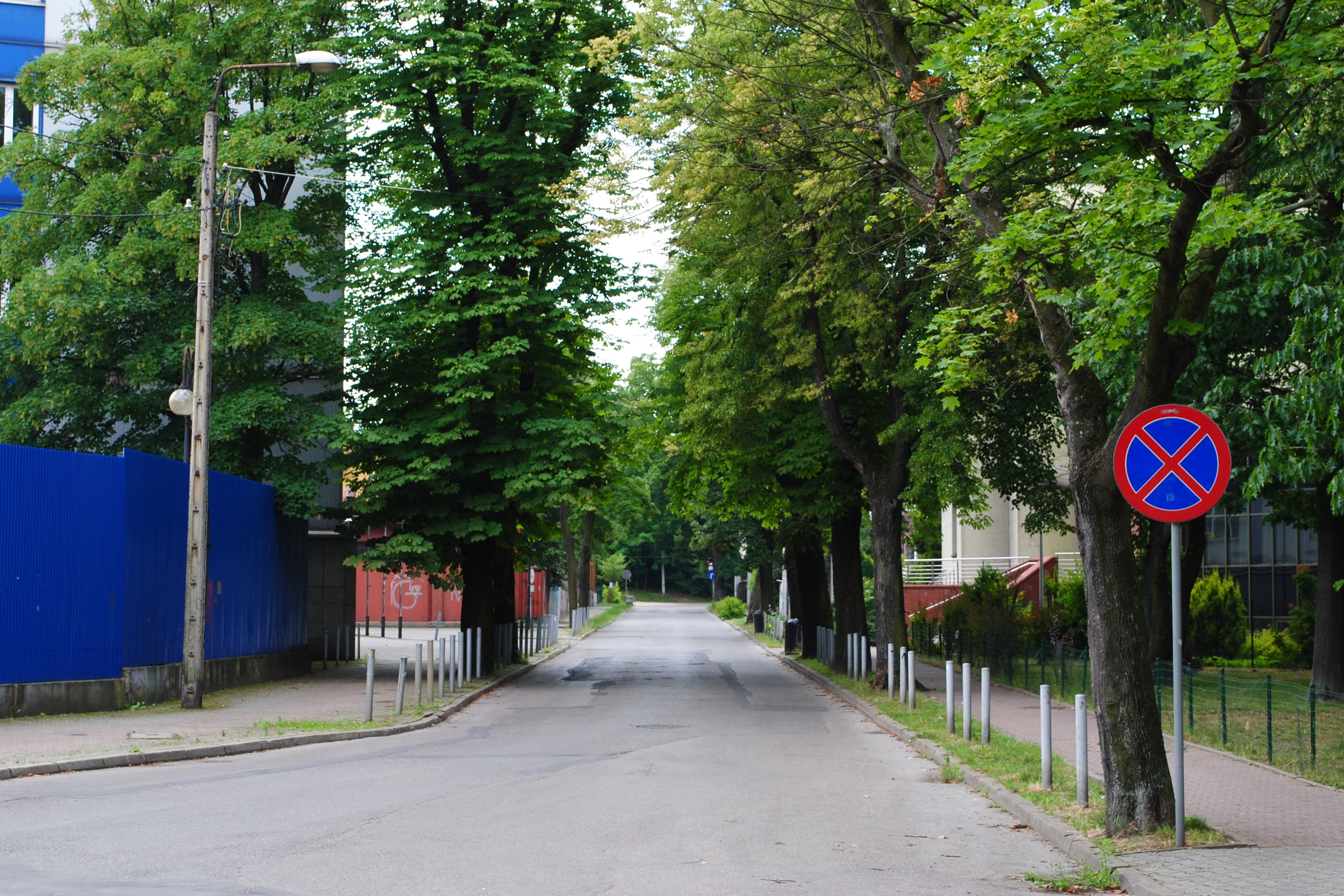
P. Pośpiech Street (view to the south) – part of the former via magna road leading towards Mikołów (2014)

Załęże is surrounded by three major transportation arteries that are important to Metropolis GZM: the A4 motorway (Kochłowicka Street; it partially follows the southern border of Załęże), Drogowa Trasa Średnicowa (voivodeship road 902 – Nikodem and Józef Reniec Avenue, including the Orląt Lwowskich Overpass; part of the route is located within Załęże), and national road 79 (Chorzowska Street; outside Załęże). All three of these roads are connected by Feliks Bocheński and Bracka streets to form a major traffic junction.

The following streets are among the most important thoroughfares within the district:

- Bracka Street – a street running north-south, passing through Dąb and Załęże. It intersects with Chorzowska Street and Nikodem and Józef Reniec Avenue. It is a main county road.
- Feliks Bocheński Street – a street running north-south, connecting Załęże with Załęska Hałda, and, together with Bracka Street, also the A4 motorway with Drogowa Trasa Średnicowa. Katowice–Legnica railway from Katowice to Wrocław runs above it. It is a distributor county road.
- Gliwicka Street – the main street in Załęże, connecting Śródmieście with Chorzów (the district of Chorzów Batory) through Załęże, with length of over 4 km. It has no significant transport importance due to this role being taken over by neighboring routes of supra-urban significance. The road in the Załęże section has a characteristic, winding course. Most of other roads in the district lead to this street. It is a distributor county road.
- Wincenty Janas Street – a street in the central part of Załęże, approximately 260 meters long and running north-south. It is one of the main roads of Osiedle Janasa-Ondraszka. To the north, it intersects with Gliwicka Street, and to the south with P. Pośpiech Street. It is a local municipal road.
- Lisa Street – a street in the western part of Załęże, approximately 190 m long. To the north, it intersects with Gliwicka Street, while to the south, it ends as a dead-end before the railroad tracks. It is a municipal access road.
- Paweł Pośpiech Street – a street 1.3 km long, initially running in a meridional direction, then in a latitudinal direction, where it has two lanes. It borders the urbanized part of Załęże to the south and connects F. Bocheński Street with Gliwicka Street. it is a local municipal road.
- Wiśniowa Street – a street approximately 260 m long with a meridian layout. It connects Gliwicka Street with Obroki and Osiedle Witosa. It is traversed by bicycle route No. 103 and the Polish Tourist and Sightseeing Society 25th Anniversary Trail. It is a local county road.

In the past, several historic routes ran through Załęże, traces of which are still visible in the current road network. One of these was a road mentioned in 1360 as the via magna. It connected the former trade route from Bytom to Kraków (later national road 94) and Mikołów via Bańgów, Dąb, Załęże, Załęska Hałda, and Ligota. The present-day streets of Żelazna, P. Pośpiech, and Żeliwna follow its route.

The road following the route of present-day Gliwicka Street existed in the 18th century, but it was established even earlier – most likely in the late 16th or 17th century. The current Gliwicka Street was originally a winding dirt road connecting Bogucice and Hajduki. It was not until the construction of the railway in the 1840s that the via magna was rerouted through the present-day Gliwicka Street to the folwark and further along F. Bocheński Street to Kokociniec.

=== Rail transport ===
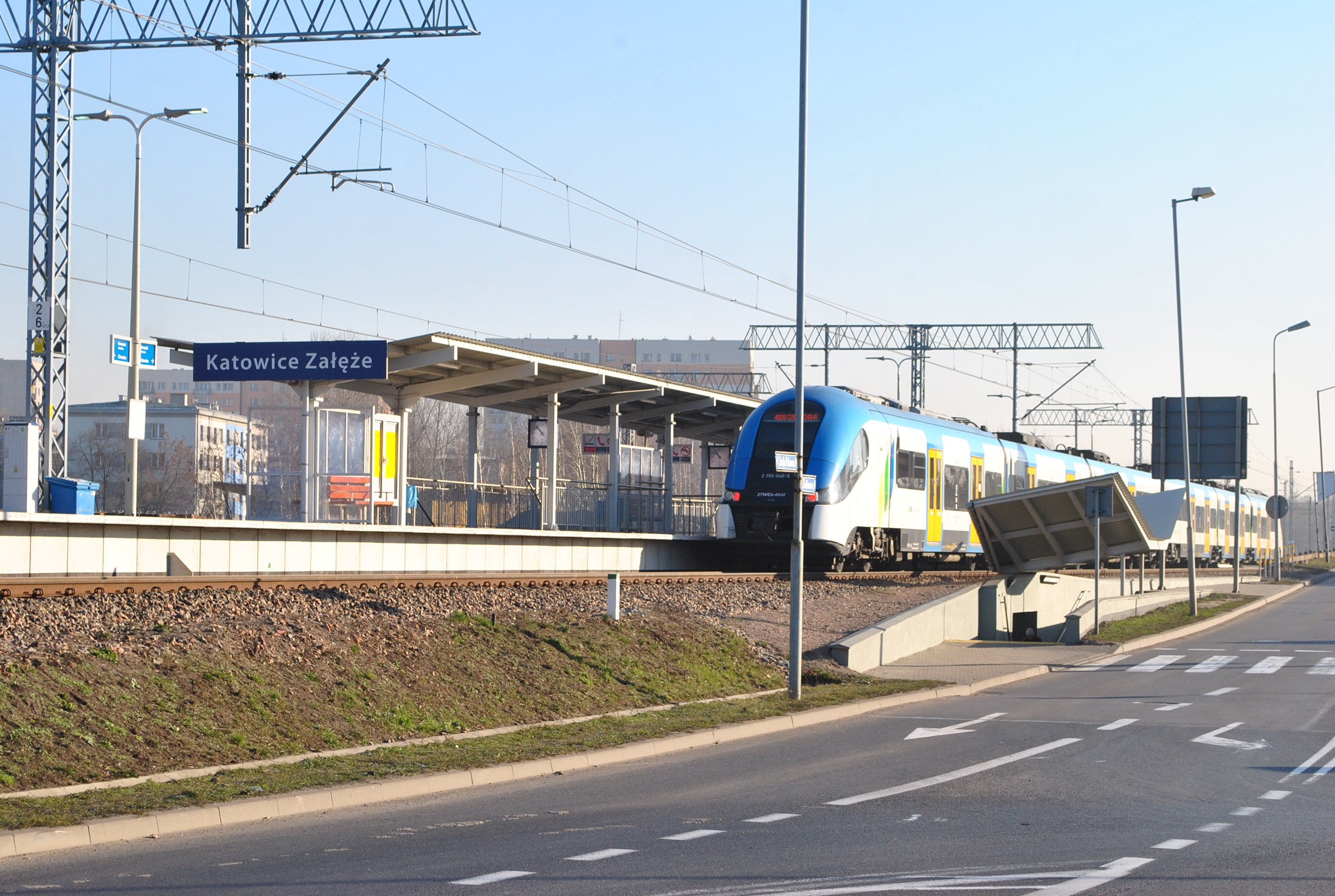
Katowice Załęże railway station from the side of F. Bocheński Street

The establishment of Katowice–Legnica railway was part of plans to build a railway from Wrocław to Upper Silesia. In 1835, the Joint-Stock Company of the Upper Silesian Railway was formed. That same year, surveying work was conducted on the Siemianowice Śląskie–Roździeń–Bieruń Nowy section, but the route was later changed, likely due to the efforts of Franz von Winckler, who had moved the administration of his estates to Katowice. On 5 April 1841, the Upper Silesian Railway Company was established. The railway from Wrocław to Mysłowice was opened in stages, with the Świętochłowice–Katowice–Mysłowice section opening on 3 October 1846, without building a station in Załęże. The Upper Silesian Railway launched a railway along the eastern border of Załęże on 1 December 1852, connecting Katowice with Murcki (to the Murcki Coal Mine, the oldest of its kind in Upper Silesia) via Ligota. In 1859, the Katowice Towarowa station was built at the site of the later Katowice Załęże railway station. Today, it is a junction where two railways intersect: 137 and 712. The Katowice Załęże railway station itself was opened in 1971.

=== Bicycle transport ===
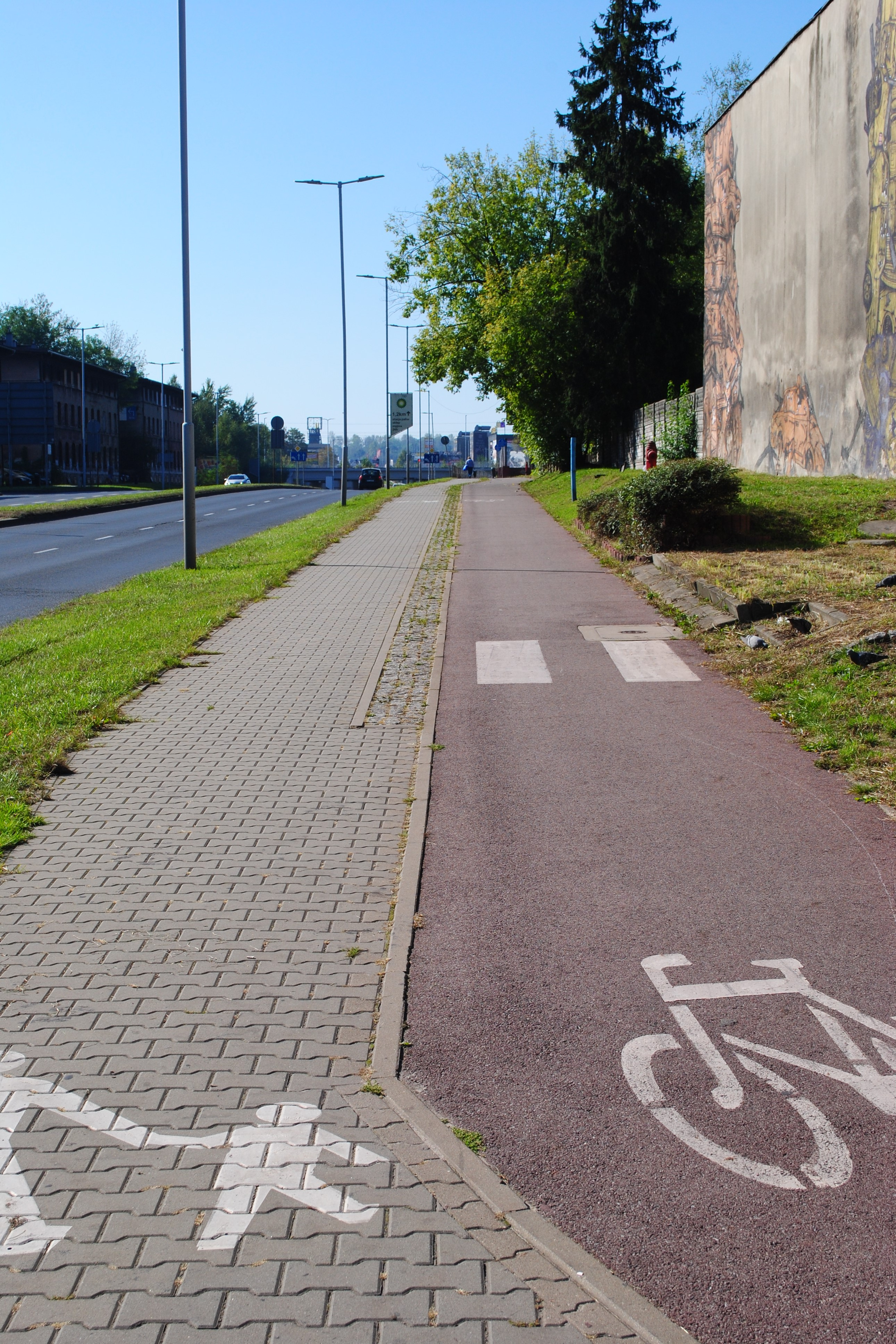
Cycle path and pavement along F. Bocheński Street (2024)

The bicycle infrastructure network in Załęże is concentrated in the western part of the district, west of F. Bocheński Street. According to the target bicycle path network published by the City of Katowice, this network was fully developed in July 2022, and all the routes are designated for transportation purposes.

As of mid-2022, the following types of bicycle paths existed in Załęże:

- Bicycle paths – Bracka Street (on the eastern side; asphalt), F. Bocheński Street from the intersection with Gliwicka Street to J. Pukowiec Street (on the western side of the street; asphalt), and Gliwicka Street (a short section between the intersections with F. Bocheński and Pokoju streets; asphalt; northern side of the street).
- Pedestrian and bicycle routes – the road connecting Załęże with Osiedle Tysiąclecia between the Załęże Wiśniowa tram stop and the Maroko Pond (cobblestone road).
- Routes with permitted sidewalk traffic – Wiśniowa Street along its entire length (western side; cobblestones), Gliwicka Street from the intersection with John Paul II Street to J. Kupiec Street (to the intersection with Wiśniowa Street on the northern side of the road, the remaining section on the southern side; cobblestones), and F. Bocheński Street to the intersection with J. Pukowiec Street (eastern side).

As part of the "Cycling Through Silesia" project, bicycle routes have been designated within the city, one of which passes through Załęże:

- Cycle route no. 103 (7.1 km): Kokociniec – Załęska Hałda – Osiedle Witosa – Załęże (Wiśniowa Street) – Osiedle Tysiąclecia – Silesian Park.

Załęże also has a section of the city's bike-sharing network – Metrorower – which replaced the City by bike system. In late April and early May 2021, a City by bike station was established at the Katowice Załęże bus stop. In 2022, the city bike rental network was expanded with three new stations: on 1 May 2022, a station was opened at the Załęże Wiśniowa tram stop, on 1 June at the intersection of Gliwicka and John Paul II streets, and on 1 July of the same year at the former Załęże town hall.

As of mid-November 2024, the following Metrorower stations are located in Załęże: 27151 (intersection of Gliwicka and Bracka streets), 27153 (S. Bareja Square), 27315 (Gliwicka Street, Katowice Wiśniowa tram stop), 27367 (Żeliwna Street, ORW Bugla), 27600 (Gliwicka Street, Załęże Dom Kultury tram stop), 27698 (J. Pukowiec Street, near Katowice Załęże station), and 27710 (at 102 Gliwicka Street).

=== Urban public transport ===
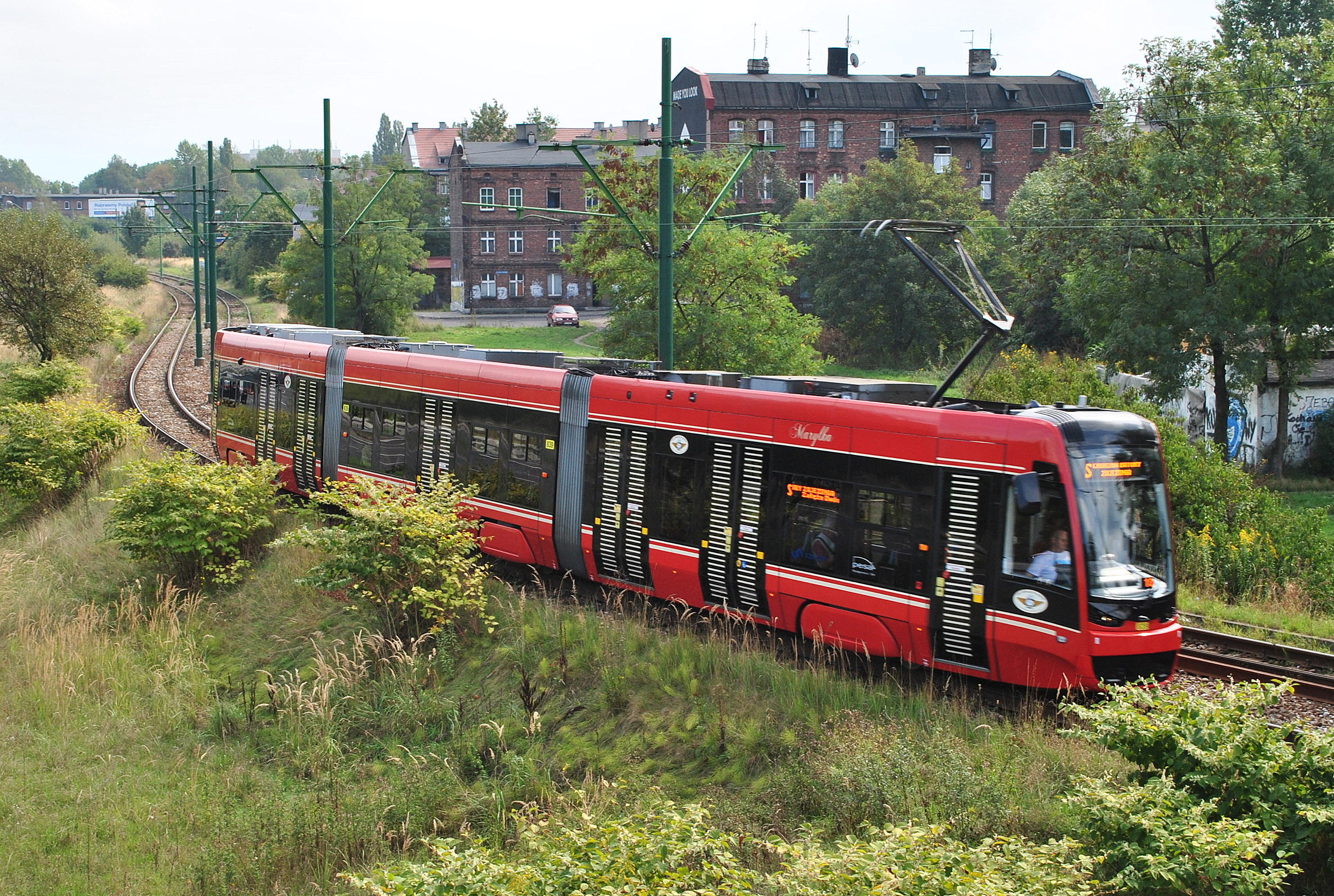
Pesa Twist Step 2012N tram near the Załęże Wiśniowa stop

Załęże is served by a public transit network consisting of buses and trams, operated on behalf of the Metropolitan Transport Authority. As of mid-August 2020, the main routes served by public transit are:

- Gliwicka Street: mainly tram service; a total of 8 tram trips per hour during rush hour; main destinations: Śródmieście, Zawodzie, and Chorzów Batory; some services operated with low-floor trams.
- Wiśniowa Street – Gliwicka Street – Jana Pawła II Street: bus service (lines: 51, 109, 138); a total of 6 round trips during rush hour; main destinations: Osiedle Tysiąclecia, Osiedle Witosa, and Ligota-Panewniki.

The following bus routes also pass through Załęże: 7 (along Gliwicka and John Paul II streets), 70 (along Gliwicka and F. Bocheński streets), and 870 (along Drogowa Trasa Średnicowa, without a stop in Załęże). Near the A4 motorway, there is also the Katowice Osiedle Kopalni Wujek bus stop, where 9 bus lines operate (including one night line).

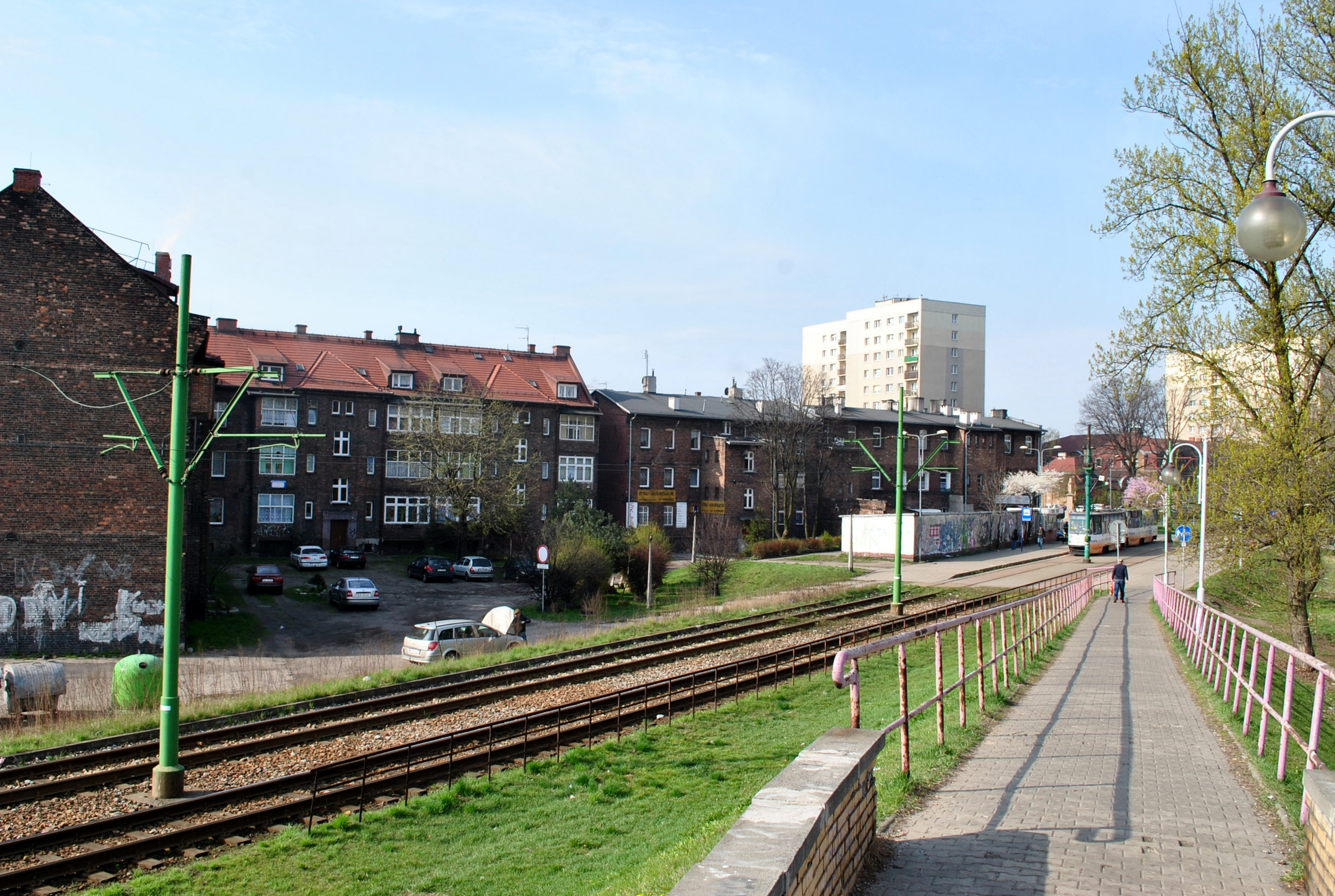
Załęże Wiśniowa tram stop, built in 1994 together with the relocation of the tram tracks from Gliwicka Street

The construction of the tram line through Załęże was linked to the granting of a concession, among others, for the Katowice–Hajduki line to the Katowice-based company Schikora & Wolff. The company Kramer & Co. was also interested in building the line and obtained a concession for the Katowice–Zawodzie section. Ultimately, the concession for the narrow-gauge Mysłowice–Katowice–Załęże–Świętochłowice–Bytom line was granted to Oberschlesische Dampfstrassenbahn GmbH (ODS) by 1899. The Hajduki Górne–Załęże–Katowice section was opened on 7 September 1899. The entire route was single-track and narrow-gauge (785 mm).

Due to mining damage that was affecting the condition of the tracks, a decision was made to rebuild the line as a standard-gauge, double-track line. Work began in the 1920s. The Katowice–Załęże section was opened on 21 September 1929, following the reconstruction, and the Załęże–Hajduki section opened on 27 November of that year. In 1936, lines 7 (every 20 minutes) and 14 ran through Załęże.

After 1989, work began on modernizing the tram network in Załęże. In the early 1990s, in connection with the construction of the Cross-City Road, the tram line was rerouted from Bracka Street to Wiśniowa Street, moving it off the right-of-way of Gliwicka Street onto a separate track bed. The new, 960-meter-long double-track section was opened on 5 September 1994. On 15 November 2008, the modernization of the tracks on Gliwicka Street between Żelazna and F. Bocheński streets was completed. On 5 April 2014, modernization began on the section from the stop at Wiśniowa Street to the city limits, and on 1 May 2015, on the tram crossing on Bracka Street. Scheduled tram service along the entire length of both sections resumed on 1 June of the same year.

== Architecture and urban planning ==
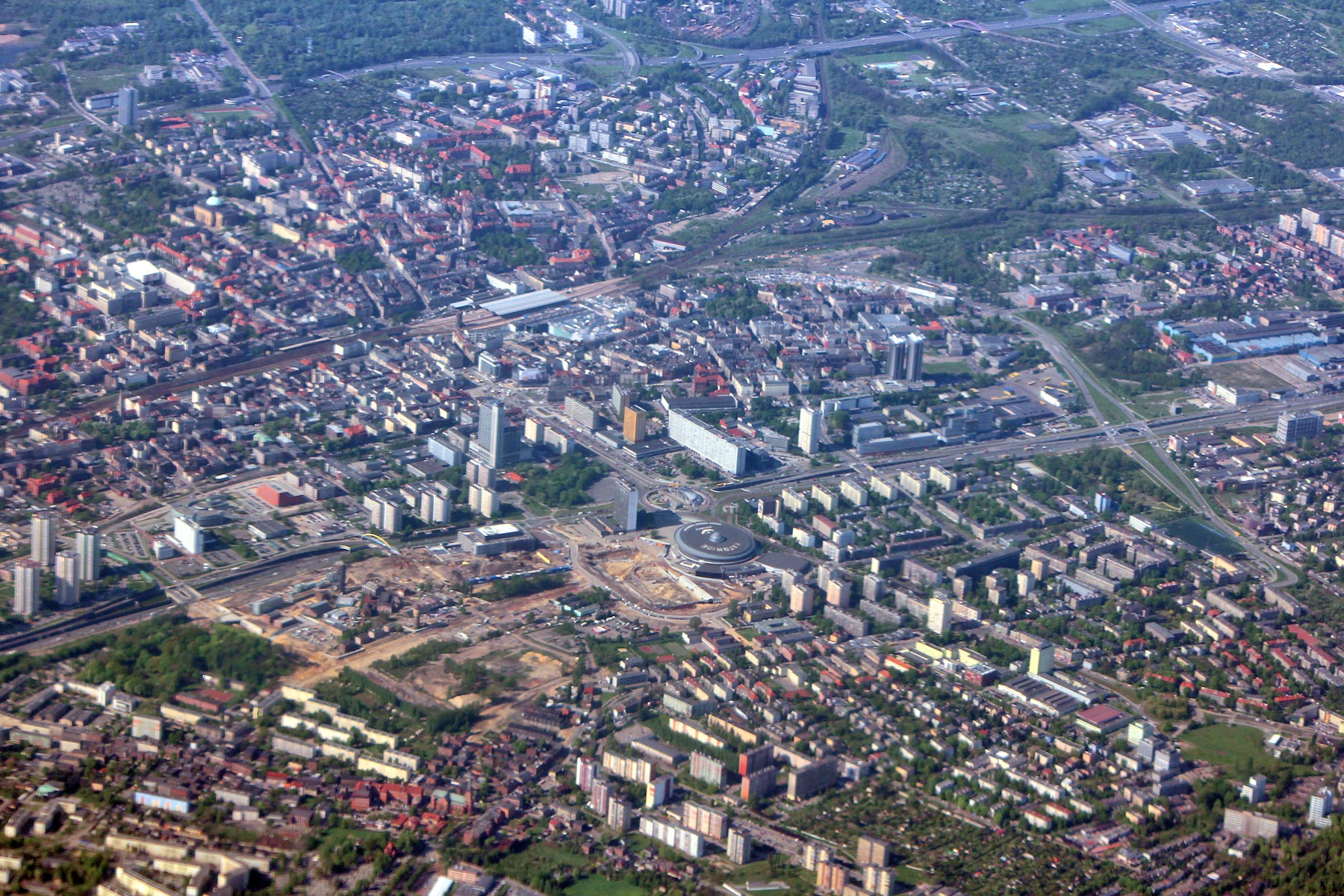
View of central Katowice in May 2013; the eastern part of Załęże is visible in the upper right

In terms of its spatial layout, Załęże can be divided into northern and southern sections, separated by Katowice–Legnica railway. The northern, main part of the district is characterized by varied developments, dating mainly from the 19th and 20th centuries, stretching along the winding Gliwicka Street, whose route is a remnant of rural development from the 18th and 19th centuries. This area has great historical value. Other roads of historical significance in this part of the district include Żelazna Street and P. Pośpiech Street. The southern part, stretching between the Katowice–Legnica railway and the A4 motorway, is industrial and commercial. It is the most haphazard part of the district in terms of urban planning, and its most important road is F. Bocheński Street. Załęże has a significant proportion of developed area relative to its total land area, amounting to 32%, which is one of the highest figures in Katowice.

Initially, the village of Załęże consisted of between 12 and 20 wooden houses covered with shingles and thatch, clustered around a folwark likely dating from the turn of the 13th and 14th centuries. It was located in the area of Gliwicka, F. Bocheński, and T. Szewczenki streets. The palace and the park surrounding it are remnants of the manor buildings. When the smithy was established in the 15th century, a village of the same name was erected next to it, in the area of the present-day intersection of Gliwicka, Żelazna, and P. Pośpiech streets. At that time, the entire village stretched between today's Zamułkowa Street to the west and P. Pośpiech Street to the east, with most of the buildings on the north side of Gliwicka Street.

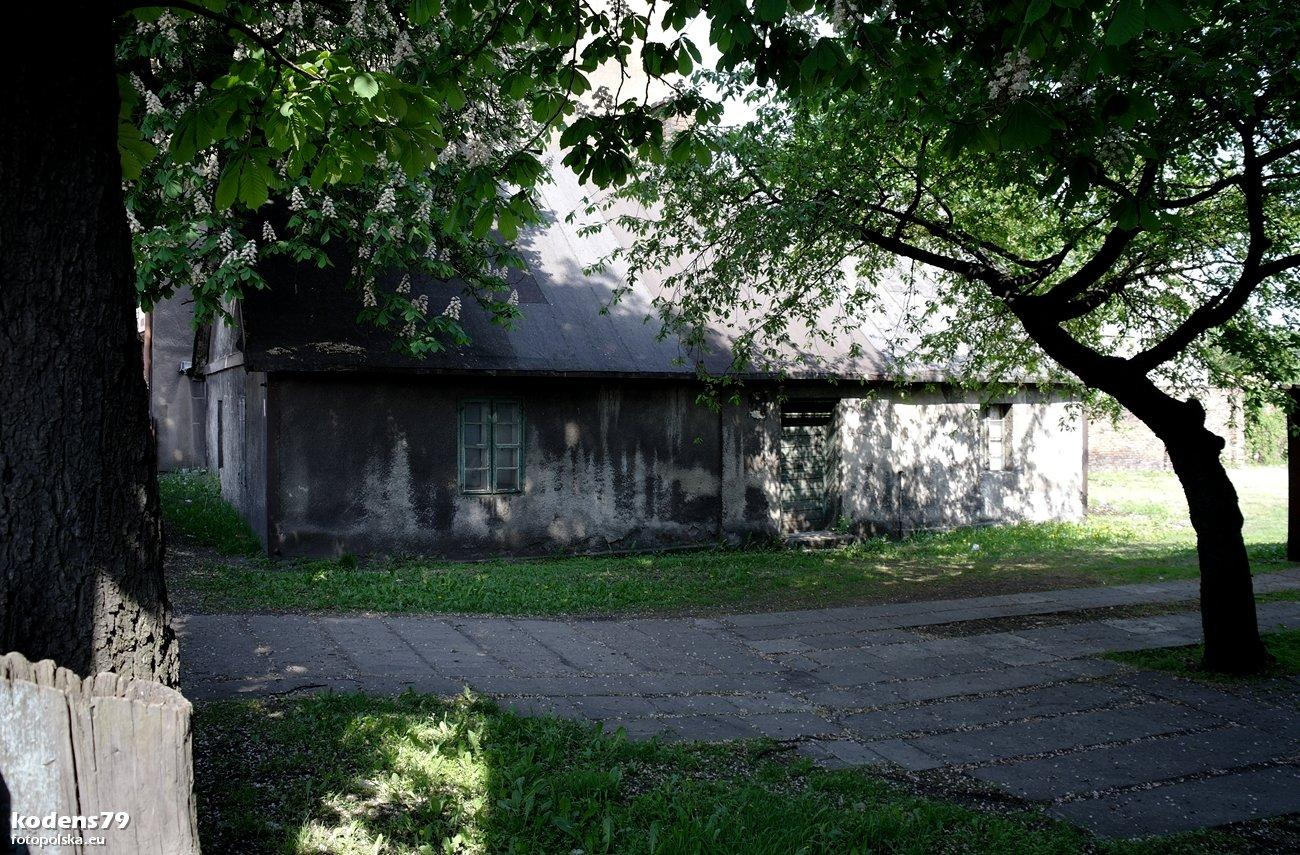
Cottage at 85 Gliwicka Street – before its demolition, it was one of the oldest buildings in Załęże, dating from 1833 (2012)

According to the map of Christian Friedrich von Wrede from 1749, the rural settlement of Załęże was concentrated along the present-day Gliwicka Street, between the current P. Pośpiech and F. Bocheński streets. There was also a folwark in Załęże at that time. The further spatial development was linked to the growth of industry in the gmina from the late 18th century. From the 1820s, Załęże's developed area expanded westward toward the intersection with present-day Wiśniowa Street, which was then part of the route to Johanka in Załęska Hałda. In the 1860s, the main road was built up only on the northern side, while farmland stretched to the south. To the north of the developed area lay the Załęże Pond, with the Baildon Steelworks behind it, and a road leading to Dąb ran across the pond's embankment.

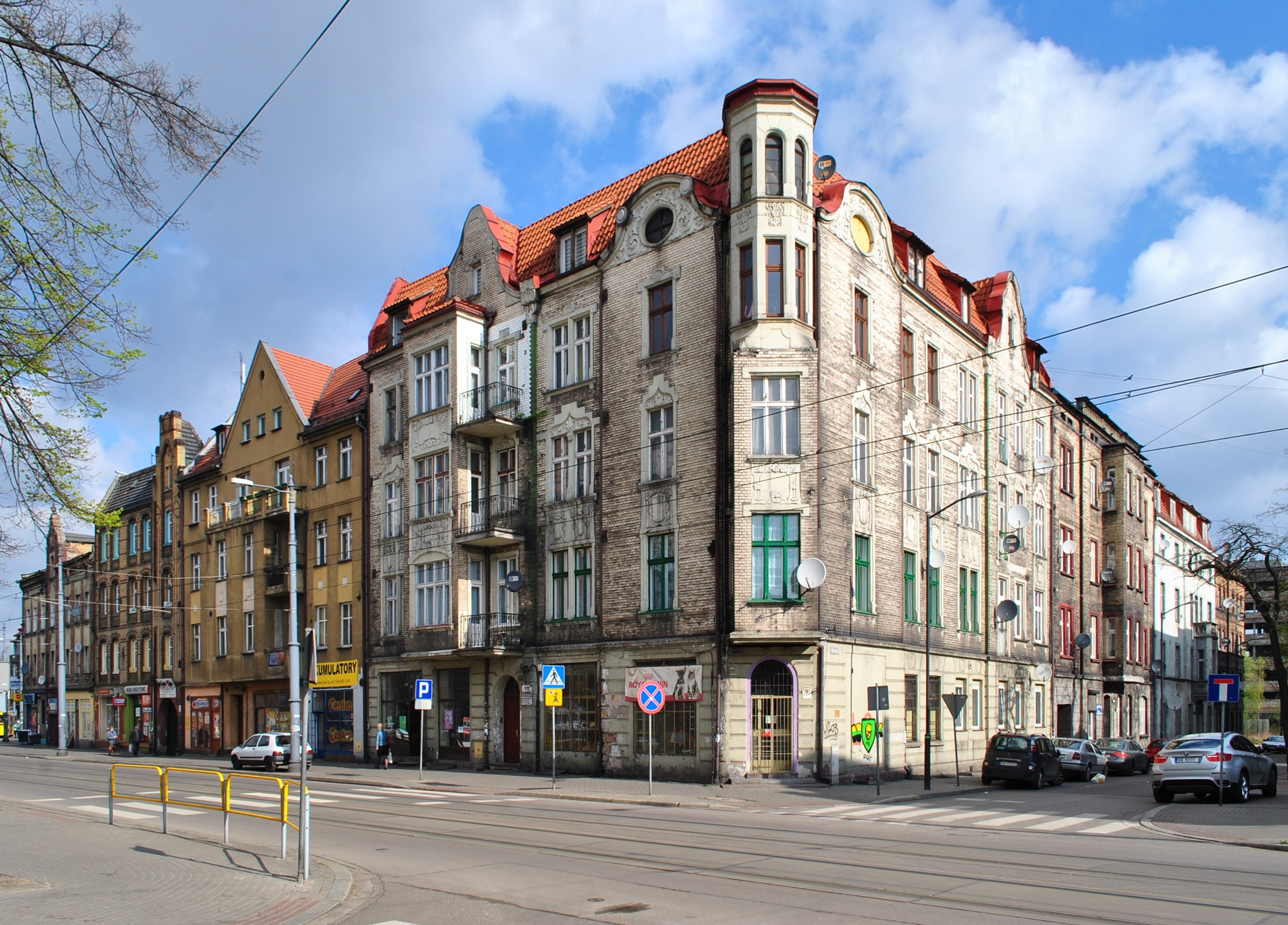
Row of tenements between F. Anioł, Gliwicka, and Marcina streets (2014)

In the 18th century, wooden structures, such as log cabins and farm buildings, dominated the entire area of Katowice, including Załęże. Wooden constructions were gradually replaced by brick buildings, particularly from the mid-19th century onward, following the implementation of regulations banning the construction of wooden structures to improve fire safety. New buildings were made of brick and were unplastered. By the end of the 19th century, the Załęże section of Gliwicka Street consisted of bourgeois tenements, familoks, and housing for workers at nearby industrial plants. There were also old rural cottages, some of which have survived to this day, serving as relics of Załęże's rural origins. Most of the present-day tenements and familoks in Załęże date from the late 19th and early 20th centuries.

The former rural cottage, one of the oldest buildings in Załęże and in all of Katowice at the time, stood at 85 Gliwicka Street until mid-May 2023. The house is said to have been built in 1833, since this date was inscribed on a beam beneath the ceiling. After the death of its last resident in 1990, the cottage stood abandoned. In 2018, it had become the property of the Seventh-day Adventist Church in Katowice.

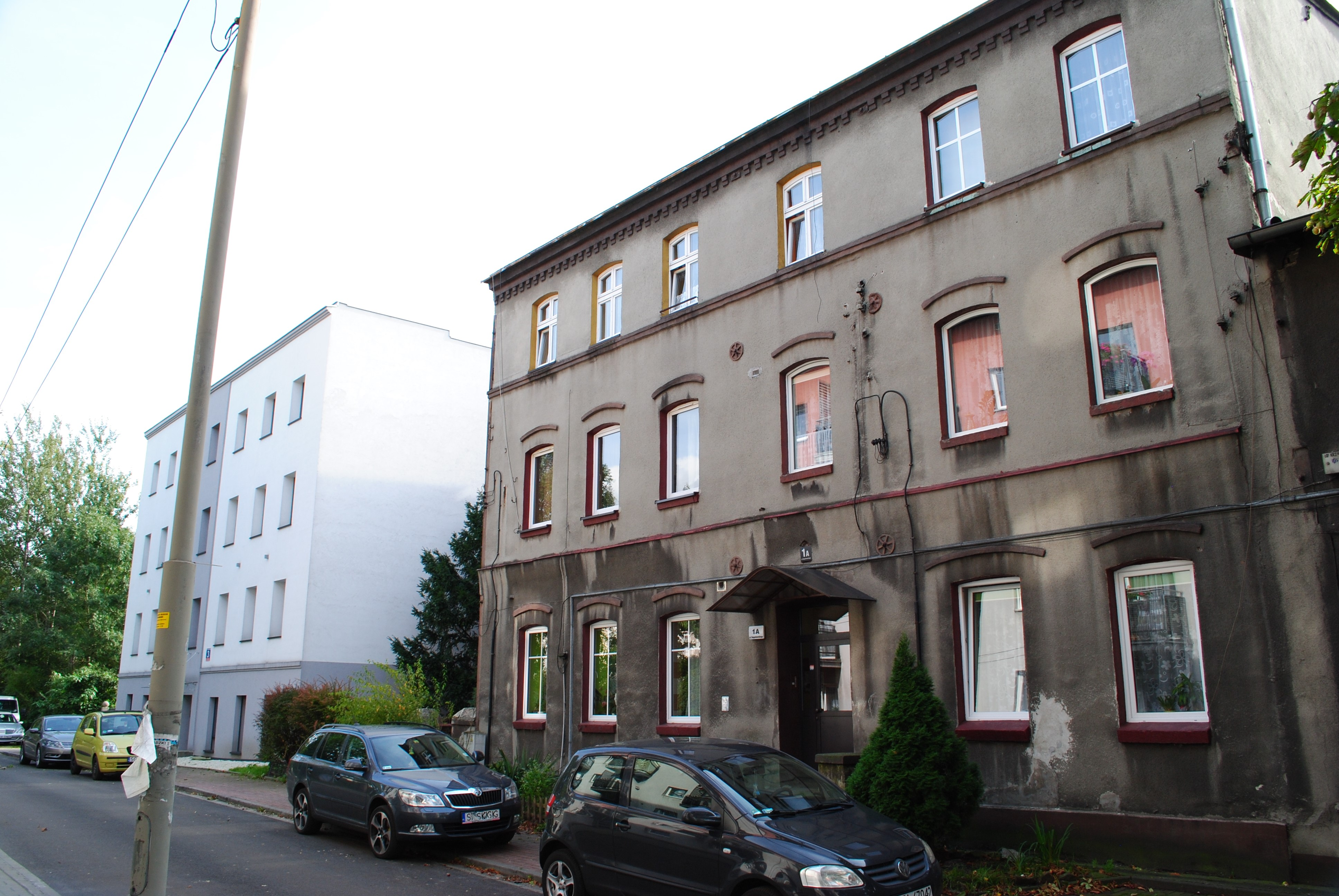
Buildings on W. Bogusławski Street – the area of Hegenscheidt's colony (2020)

Around 1870, a workers' settlement for the Baildon Steelworks – known as Kolonia Hegenscheidta – was built near W. Bogusławski Street, and was continuously expanded. It was named after August Wilhelm Hegenscheidt, the owner of the steelworks. By 1936, nine single-story workers' houses had been built on 18 Sierpnia Street, and in the postwar years, additional floors were added to these buildings, as well as new structures. The then-owner of the Cleophas Coal Mine, the Georg von Giesches Erben company, built a workers' colony in the area of present-day F. Bocheński, Lisa, and Wiśniowa streets. These buildings were constructed between 1890 and 1914. Most of them were familoks, but there were also some tenements. In 1935, the neighborhood consisted of 18 officials' houses with 3–10 apartments each and 94 workers' houses, with up to 36 apartments per building.

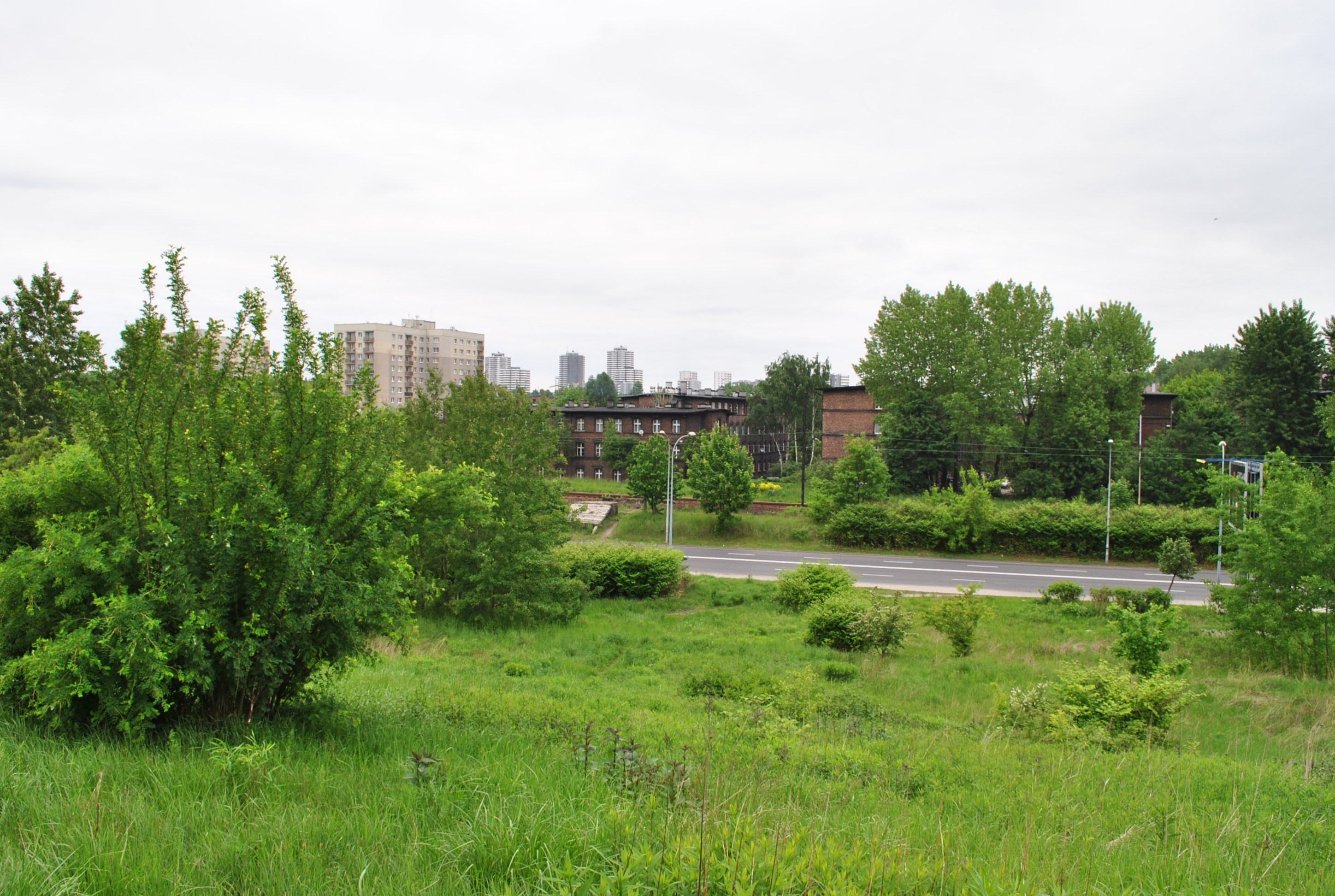
Part of the Kleofas Coal Mine workers' colony (Wiśniowa and Lisa streets) in 2015

A Neoclassical Załęże Palace was built between 1886 and 1887. It was renovated in 1905 according to a design by Emil and Georg Zillmann. From 1887 to 1945, it served as the headquarters of the Giesche company, and after World War II, it housed a health center. In 1897, the Gmina Załęże Office building was erected at the present-day 102 Gliwicka Street. It was built in Gothic Revival style, with a clock placed atop the façade. Between 1898 and 1900, the Church of St. Joseph was built. It was designed by Ludwig Schneider and has the form of a three-nave basilica, with side aisles covered by transverse gable roofs. Due to the width of the nave and the aisles, the interior of the church is particularly spacious.

On 30 November 1899, the Convent of the Sisters of St. Hedwig was consecrated, also built to a design by Ludwig Schneider. It was rebuilt twice. Originally, it had a bell tower. During World War II, it was demolished, and the bell was donated to the newly established parish in Załęska Hałda. In 1975, the building acquired its current appearance.

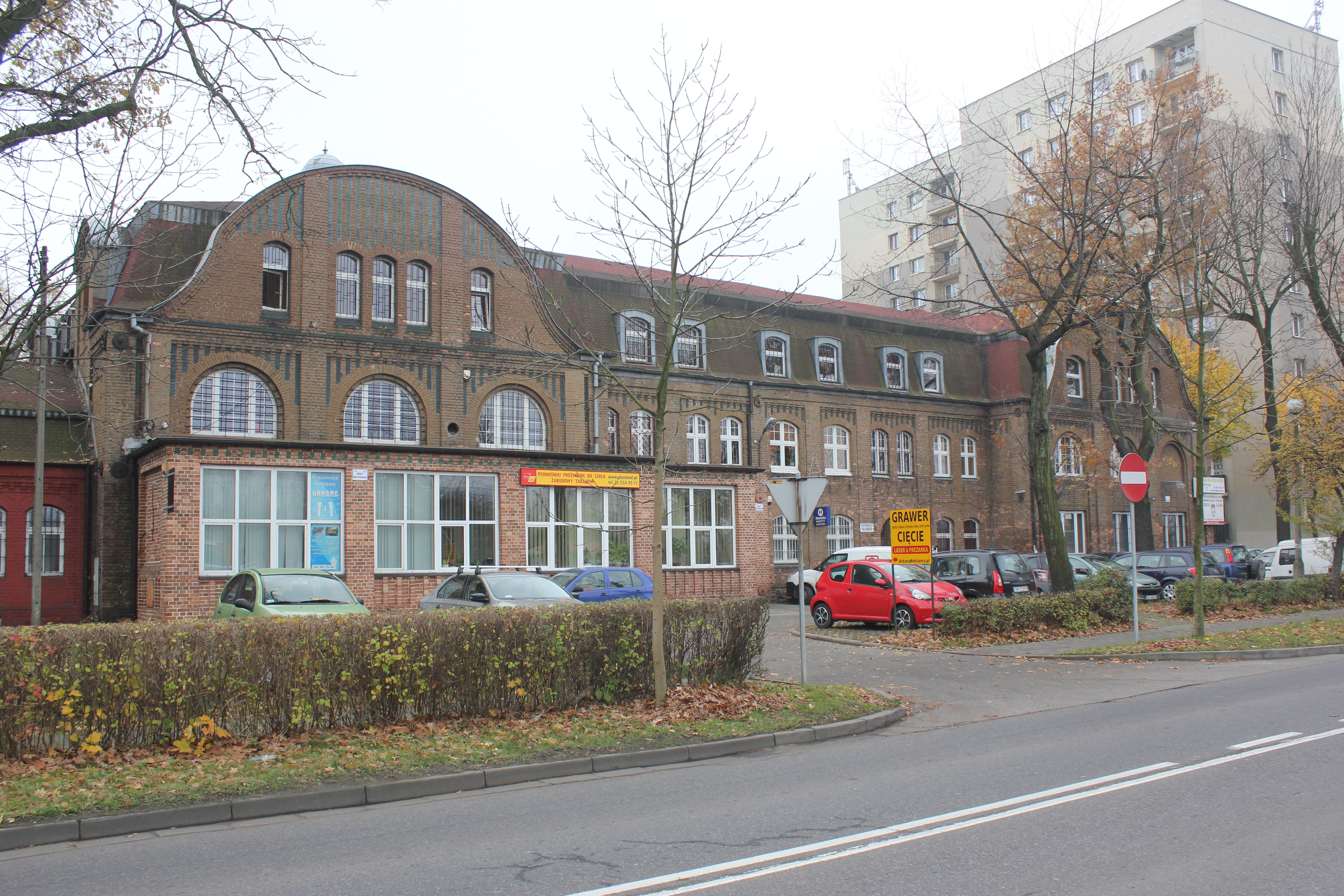
Former workers' hostel of the Kleofas Coal Mine from around 1907 (2017)

Around 1907, a workers' housing complex for miners of the Kleofas Coal Mine was built at 204 Gliwicka Street. It has elements of the historicist style and was expanded around 1920.

A map from 1902 already showed the first familoks of the Kleofas Coal Mine colony along the present-day F. Bocheński, Pokoju, Wiśniowa, and the then-planned Lisa streets. Closer to the center of Załęże, east of the manor, the following were located at that time: the post office building, the gmina's office and prison, two schools, a church, and buildings along W. Janas Street.

Osiedle Kolonia Mościckiego was built between 1927 and 1928 on post-industrial wasteland near the Kleofas Coal Mine. The estate originally consisted of 44 semi-detached houses with gabled and hipped roofs in the modern style. In the 1930s, the functionalist buildings of the Gliwicka Sports Center (formerly the seat of the Youth Cultural Center) and the Municipal Kindergarten No. 39 (originally a scout hall) were built at 212 and 214 Gliwicka Street. They were surrounded by a Jordan garden built at the same time (now the site of Załęże Park), which also had two swimming pools. Between 2005 and 2006, the former Youth Cultural Center building underwent renovation.

In the interwar period, between 1927 and 1929 (or between 1913 and 1915), a large residential building was also constructed at 5 Juliusz Zarębski Street, intended for Poles from the then-German part of Upper Silesia.

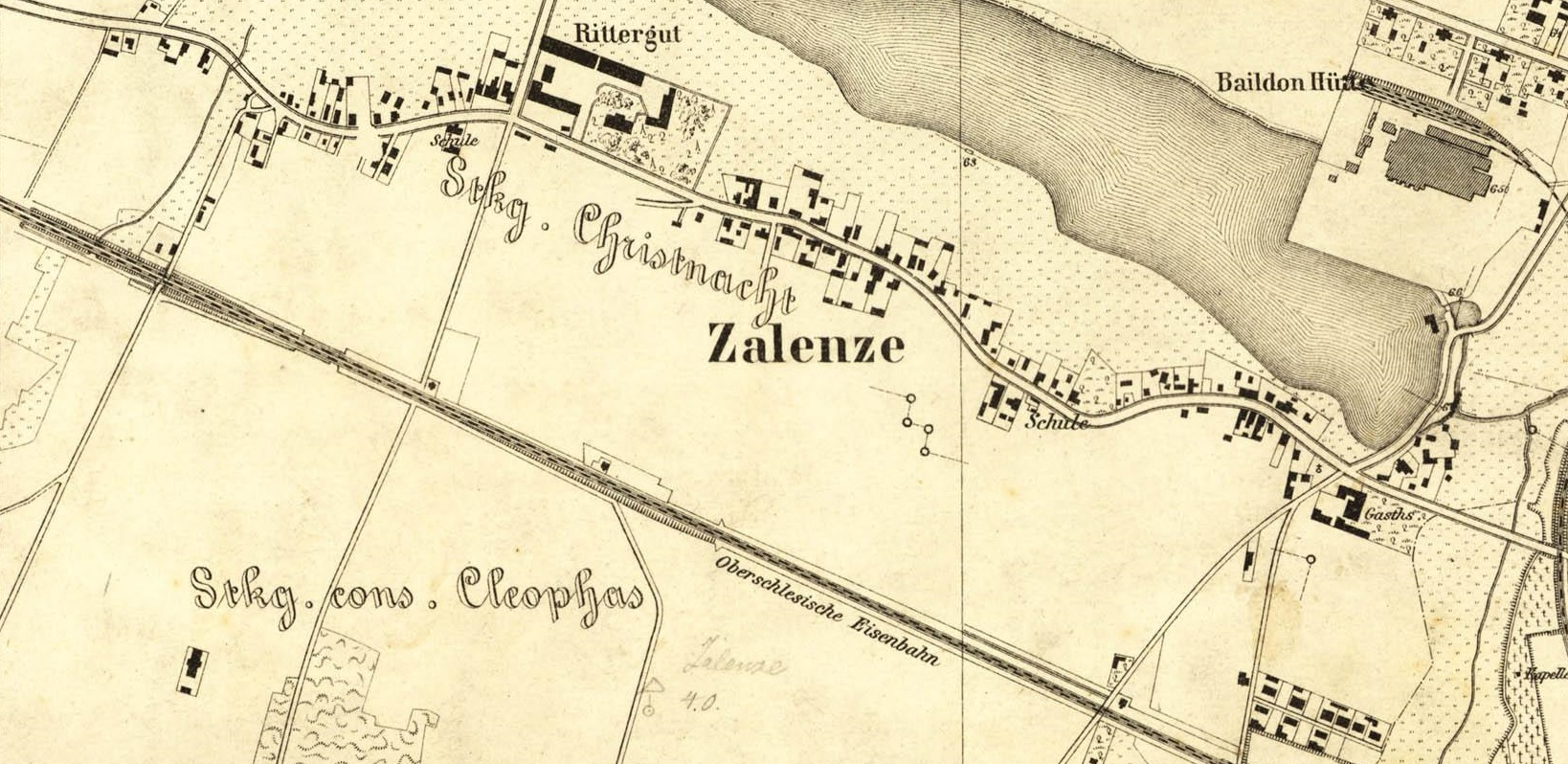
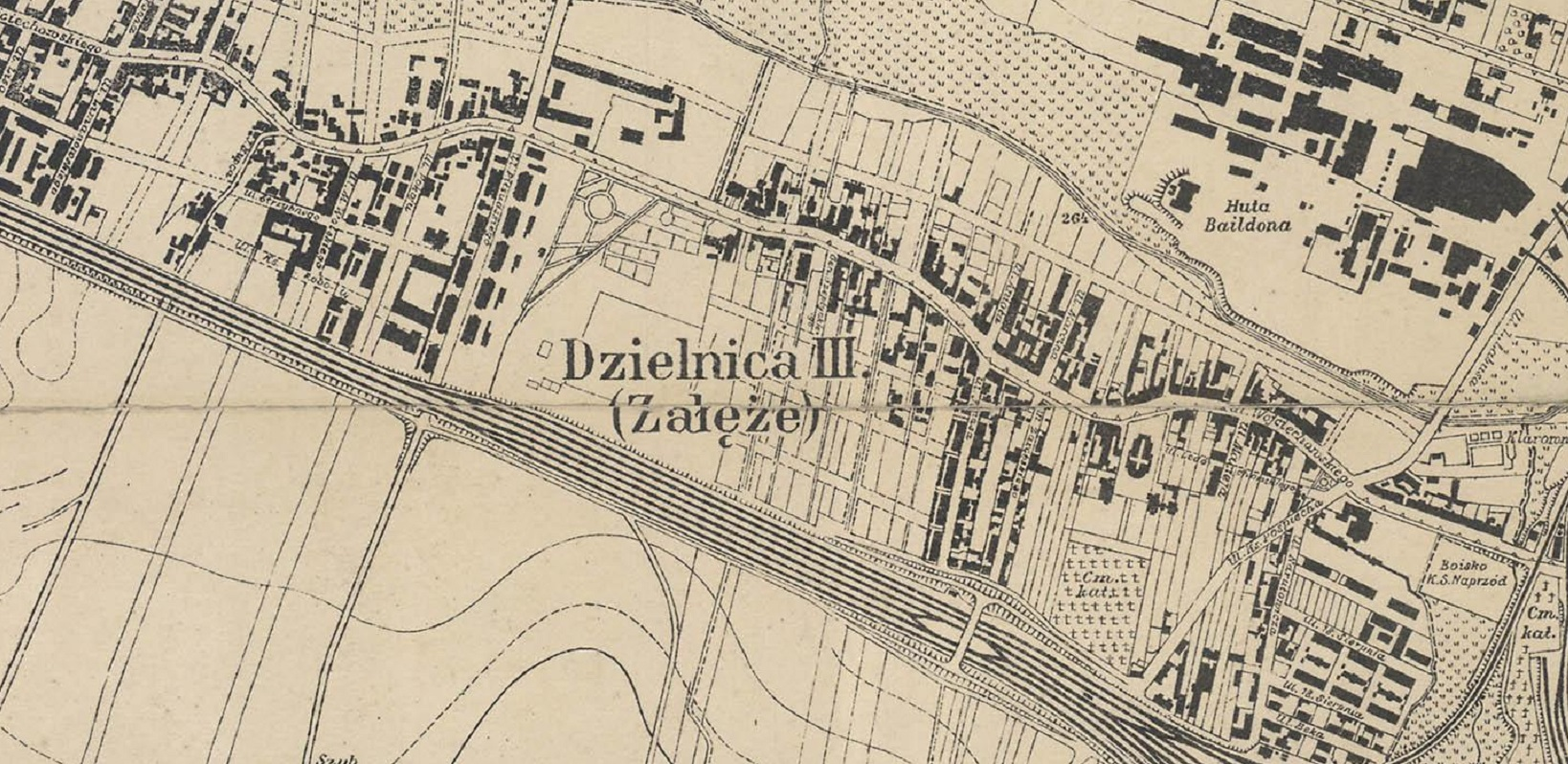
Fragments of two topographic maps: from 1880 (left) and 1926 (right), showing the urban development of the central part of Załęże. During this period, the population grew most significantly – from 3,530 in 1885 to 21, 248 people in 1924, which was linked, among other things, to industrial development. New buildings were constructed mainly in the western and southern parts

Urban development in Załęże intensified after World War II. In the 1970s, construction began on Osiedle Janasa-Ondraszka, and two 11-story apartment buildings were erected near Wiśniowa Street. The expansion of Załęska Hałda and Obroki also continued – a housing estate for employees of the Kleofas Coal Mine was built there – and in 1976, construction began on Osiedle Witosa on the site of the Finnish cottages in Załęska Hałda.

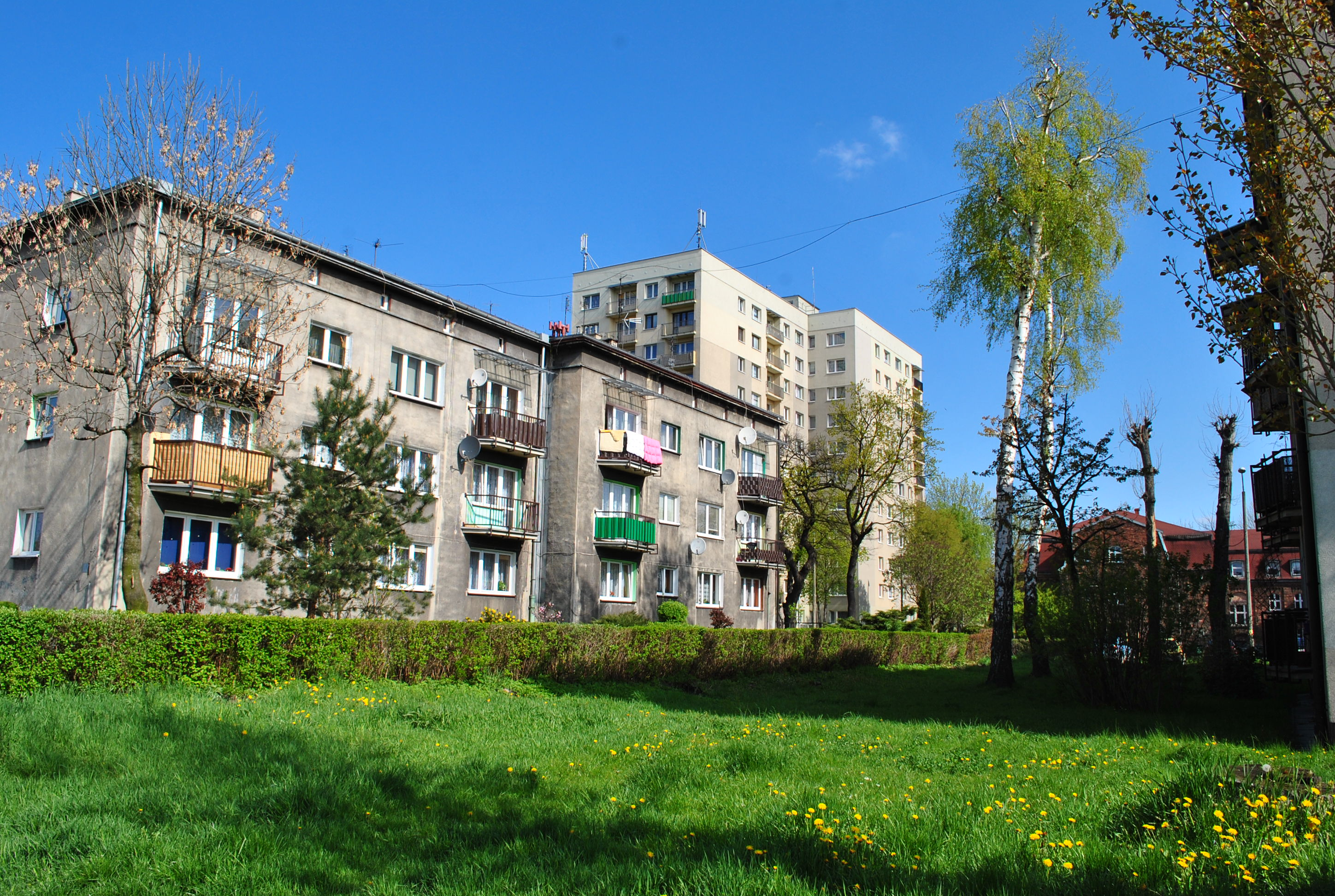
Residential buildings on J. Skrzek and Wiśniowa streets, built in the 1960s and 1970s (2014)

In the 1980s, the first plans for the redevelopment of Załęże were drawn up, which called for the demolition of buildings along Gliwicka Street between Wiśniowa and P. Pośpiech streets. The plan was to build a large transportation hub for car and tram traffic. Ultimately, these plans were never carried out. In 1995, the "Załęże 2000" program – which remained largely unimplemented – was adopted, intended to transform the district's urban structure. The main plans included preparing sites for the construction of approximately 650 new apartments and the modernization of 32 tenements, as well as the construction of Nowogliwicka Street, a rapid tram line, and boulevards along the Rawa river. Ultimately, the project was limited to the renovation of several tenements, including those at 96 and 102 Gliwicka Street, 3 Marcina Street, and 7 and 9 Ondraszka Street.

A chapel of the Bethania Pentecostal Church congregation was built at 267 Gliwicka Street between 1989 and 1997, based on a design by Kazimierz Poniatowski. The reinforced concrete structure has a distinctive dome with a diameter of 40 meters. In 2002, the Punkt 44 cinema complex was built at 44 Gliwicka Street, replacing the Baildon Katowice soccer field.

On 22 June 2009, Katowice began drafting a zoning plan covering the central part of Załęże, from Bracka Street to the district boundary along F. W. Grundmann Street. The draft plan called for, among other things, the rehabilitation of this part of the district through the preservation of historic buildings, the harmonious integration of new development with historic structures, the revitalization of existing buildings, as well as the removal of outbuildings and the introduction of landscaped green spaces in their place. As part of the plan, "Nowo-Gliwicka Street" was to be designed, as well as "Central Square" at T. Szewczenko Street, intended to serve as a neighborhood square to bring the local community together. The plan was adopted on 27 July 2016.

=== Estates and colonies ===
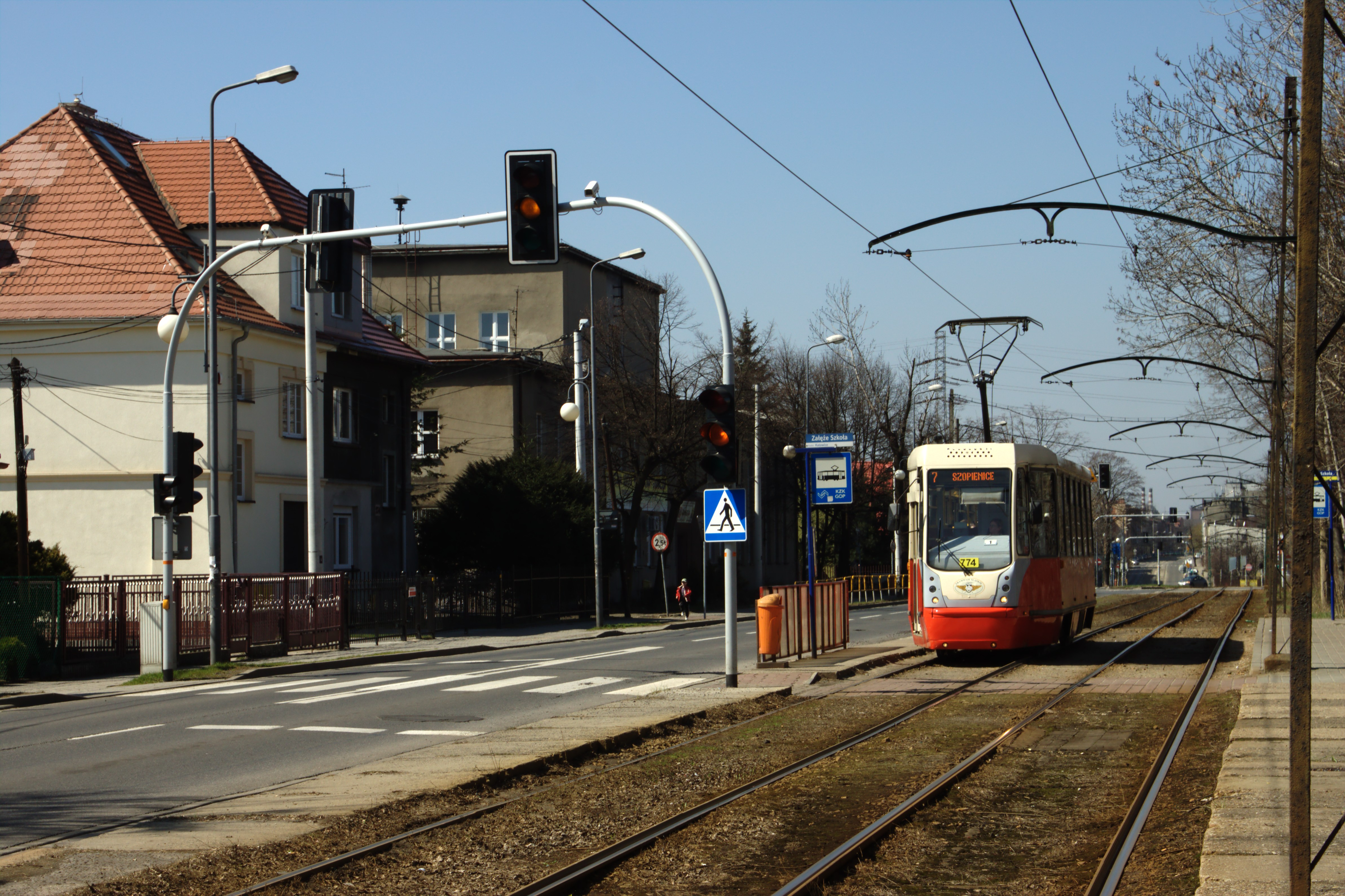
Part of Osiedle Kolonia Mościckiego

At the beginning of the 19th century, the following settlements were located within Gmina Załęże: Obroki, Johanka (or Janina), and Załęska Hałda. In the past, there was also the Owsiska settlement, situated west of Załęska Hałda, consisting of a group of houses built in the 19th century. Over time, new housing estates were established in this area. Today, the territory of the historic gmina encompasses the following districts of Katowice: Osiedle Witosa, Załęska Hałda-Brynów, and Załęże, as well as the following housing estates and colonies: Kolonia Hegenscheidta, Osiedle Kolonia Mościckiego, Kleofas Coal Mine workers' colony, Obroki, Osiedle Janasa-Ondraszka, Osiedle Witosa, and Załęska Hałda. Four of these housing estates and colonies are located within the boundaries of Załęże itself:

- Kolonia Hegenscheidta – a company town of the Baildon Steelworks, established around 1870 in the area of the present-day W. Bogusławski Street,
- Osiedle Kolonia Mościckiego – a housing estate in the northwestern part of Załęże, built on the initiative of gmina authorities between 1927 and 1928. It originally consisted of 44 two-family houses with gardens, built along short streets,
- Workers' colony of the Kleofas Coal Mine – a company-sponsored housing estate in the western part of Załęże, between Wiśniowa and F. Bocheński streets, built between 1890 and 1914 on behalf of the then-Cleophas Coal mine. It consists mainly of 3–4-story familoks and other detached buildings, including the Kleofas Coal Mine workers' hostel,
- Osiedle Janasa-Ondraszka – a housing estate between W. Janas and Ondraszka streets, built in the late 1970s and early 1980s on behalf of the Baildon Steelworks.

=== Landmarks and historical structures ===
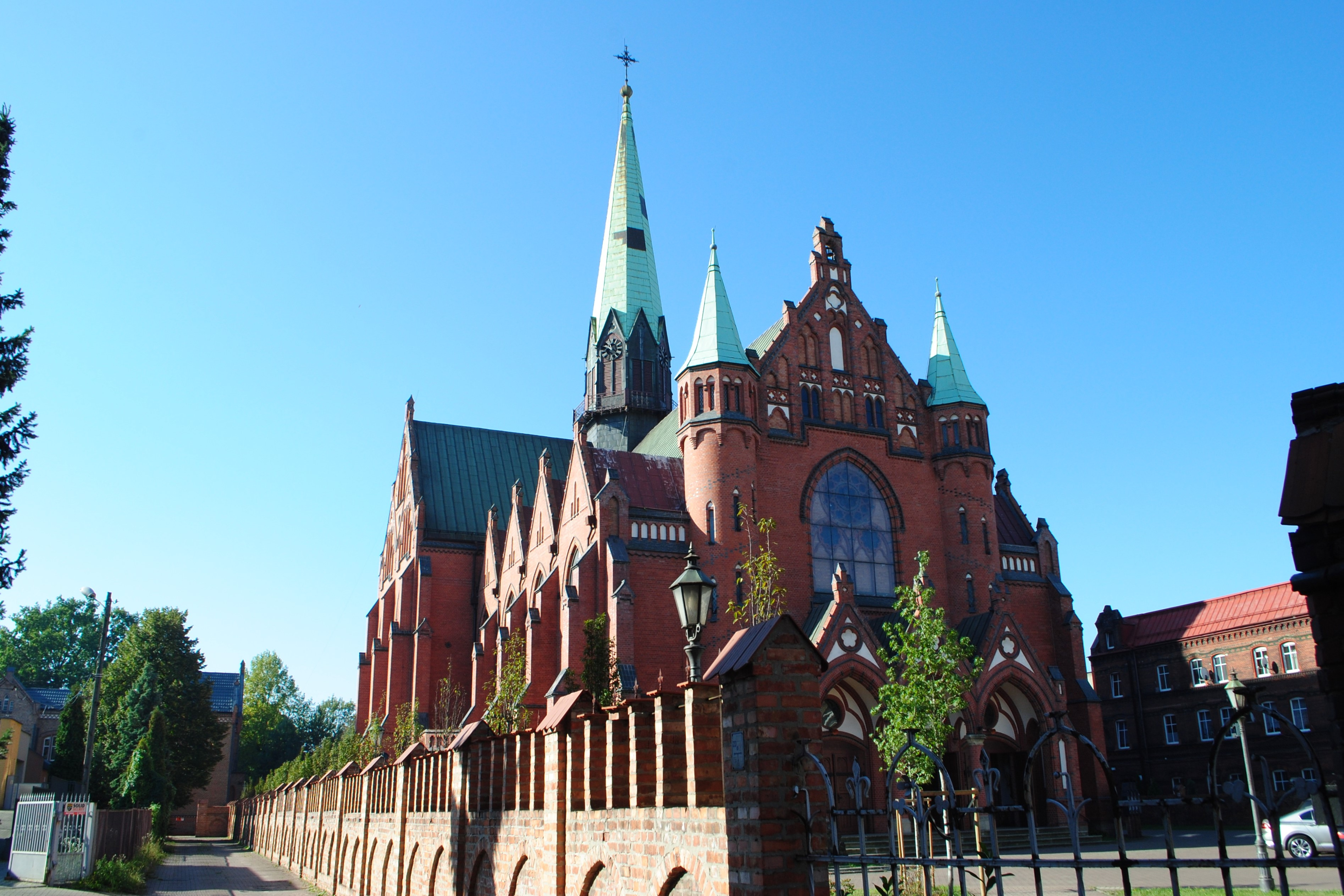
Church of St. Joseph (Gliwicka Street)

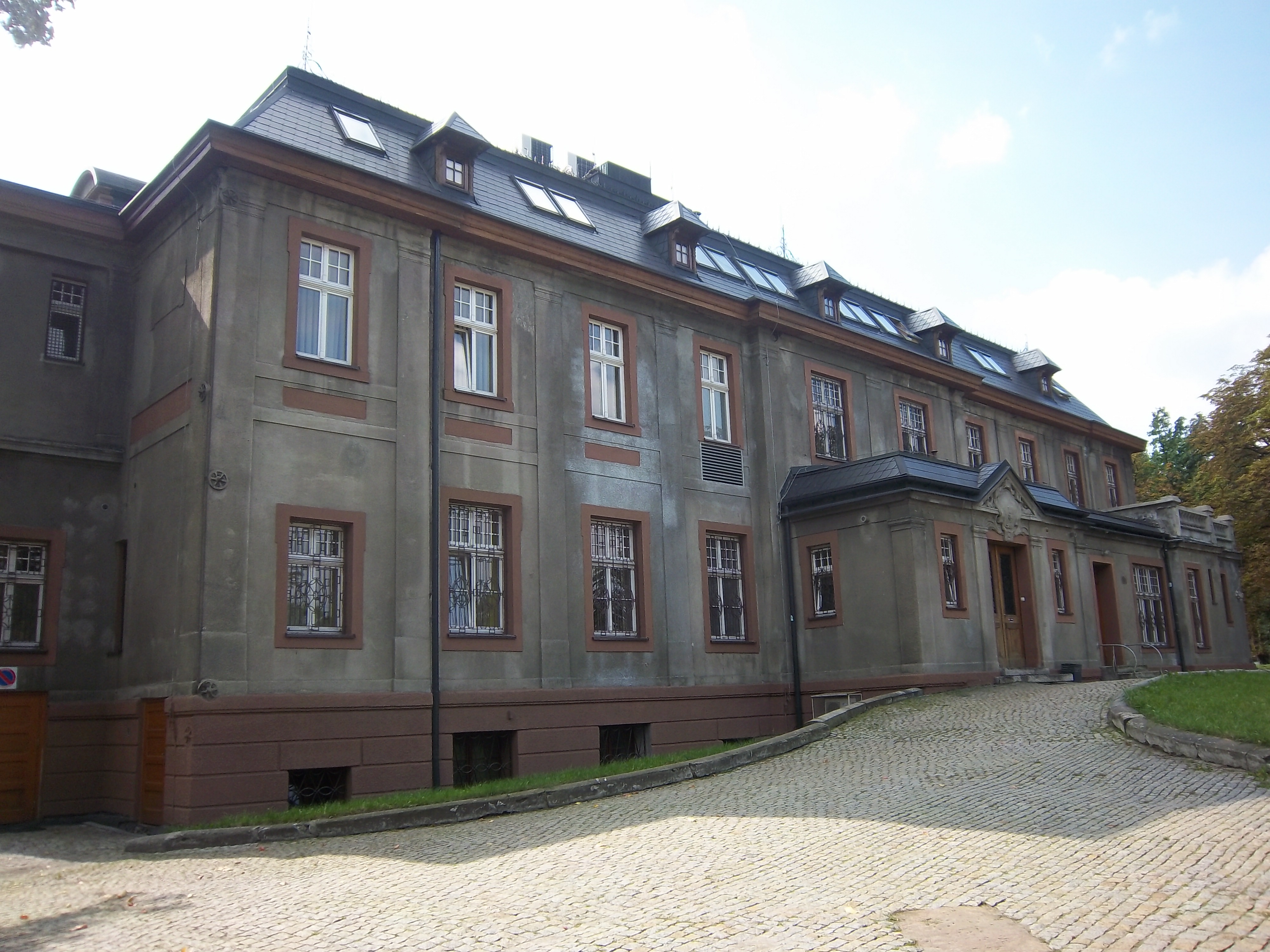
Załęże Palace (159 Gliwicka Street)

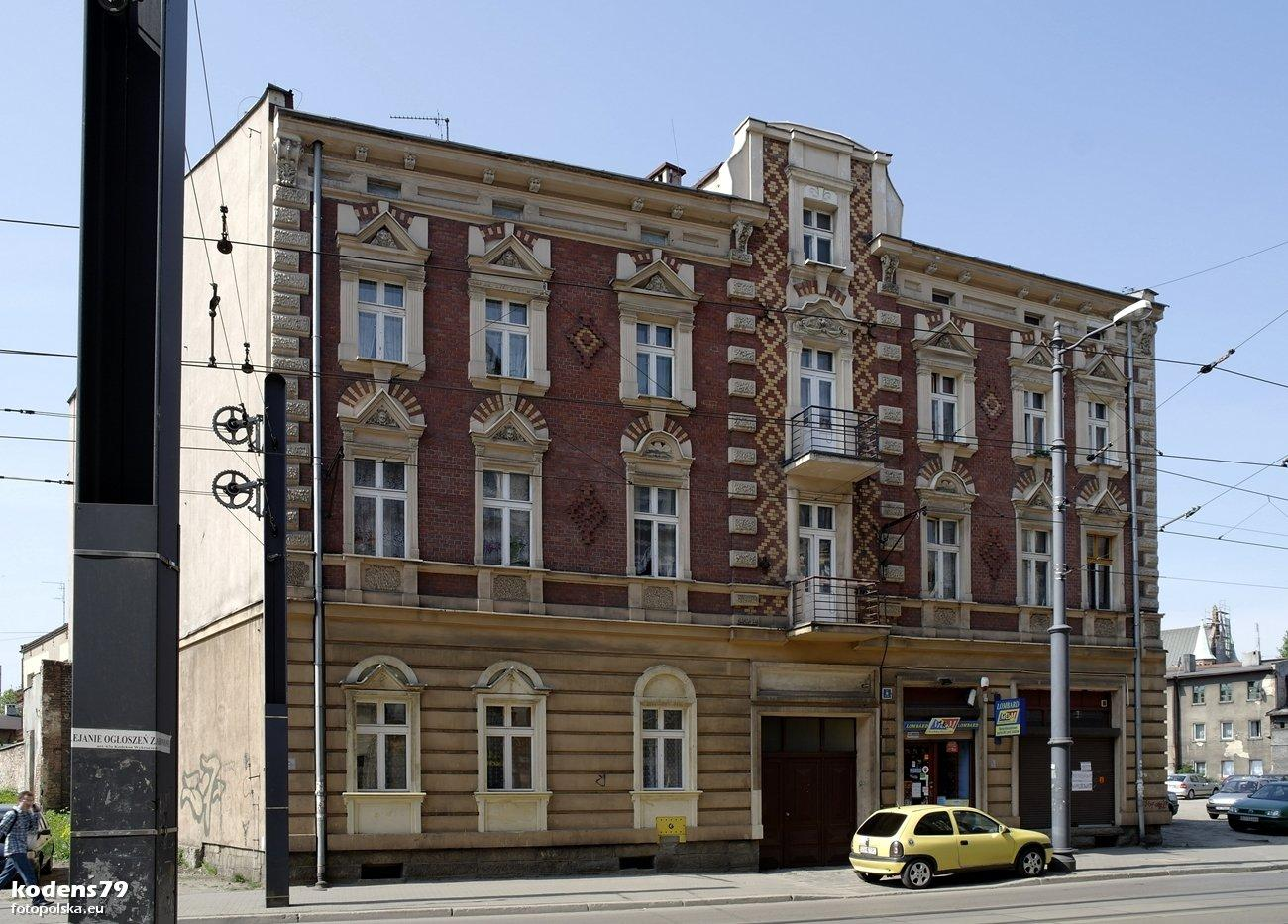
Tenement at 58 Gliwicka Street from the end of the 19th century (2012)

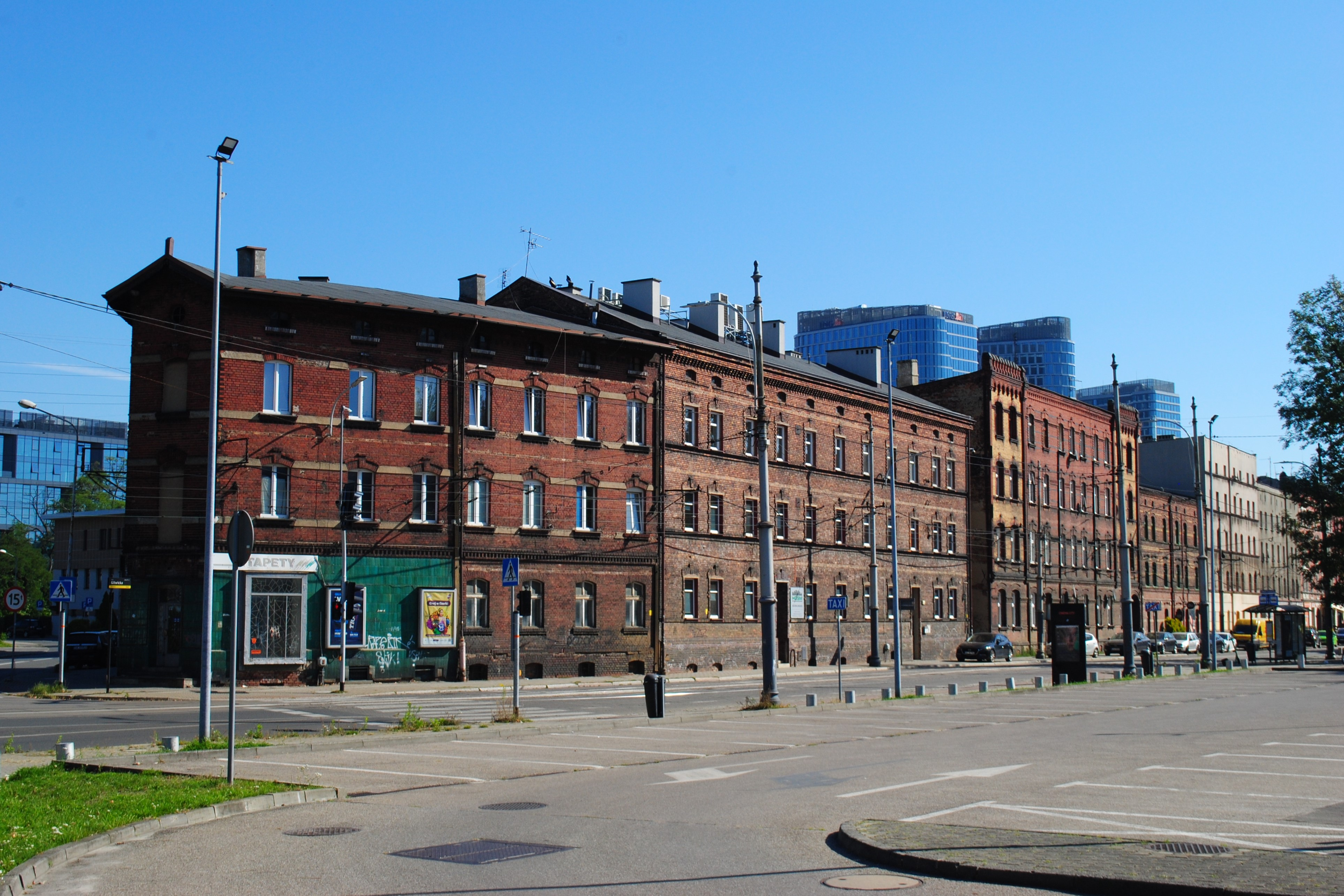
Row of tenements along 49–65 Gliwicka Street (2024)

The following historical buildings are located within the boundaries of Załęże:

- Church of St. Joseph (Gliwicka Street) – a historic parish church of the Parish of St. Joseph, built between 1898 and 1900 in the Gothic Revival style. The church's elevations are decorated with arcaded friezes, while the façade is flat, adorned with glazed ornaments. The church tower, which also serves as a belfry, is 35 m high, while the height of the church itself is 64 m. It was designed by Ludwig Schneider. The building has retained its original interior decoration. It was entered in the Registry of Cultural Property on 8 September 1978 (reg. no. A-1236/78) and on 19 July 2019 (reg. no. A/523/2019);
- Załęże Palace (159 Gliwicka Street) – a historic 19th-century manor house located at 159 Gliwicka Street. It is a Neoclassical palace surrounded by a park divided into two parts, the southern section of which is Józef Londzin Square. Between 1886 and 1945, the palace housed the regional headquarters of the Georg von Giesches Erben company, and after World War II, the Mining Outpatient Treatment Center. Today, the building is occupied by a hospital. It was entered into the Registry of Cultural Property on 8 July 1992 (reg. no. A/1473/24);
- Gmina Załęże town hall (102 Gliwicka Street) – the historic seat of the former Gmina Załęże office, built in 1897 in the Gothic Revival style. It was entered into the Registry of Cultural Property on 7 June 2022 (reg. no. A/998/2022);
- Tenements and familoks – the district is characterized by a high concentration of historic tenements and familoks, dating mainly from the late 19th and early 20th centuries. The largest number of them is located on Gliwicka Street (including at nos. 58 and 146) and its immediate vicinity, where, among the urban tenements, there are individual familoks, as well as remnants of earlier rural development. The tenements in Załęże were built mainly in the Art Nouveau, historicist, and modern styles. The complexes of protected and proposed-for-protection familoks are concentrated in two locations: W. Janas Street – a complex of historicist-style familoks dating from the late 19th century (one from the early 20th century) – and Lisa, Ślusarska, Wiśniowa, J. Wypler, Pokoju, and F. Bocheński streets – a complex of familoks of the Kleofas Coal Mine from the early 20th century, in the modern style;
- Railway bridge over the Rawa river (near the intersection of Gliwicka and F. W. Grundmann streets) – demolished in June 2022;
- Roadside cross (corner of Gliwicka and P. Pośpiech streets) – from the 1880s, with a statue of the Immaculate Virgin Mary in a niche, surrounded by greenery;
- School building (148a Gliwicka Street) – built in the early 20th century in the modern style. It is a three-story brick structure with a hip roof, stepped gables, and green brick decorations;
- School building (154 Gliwicka Street) – built in the brick modern style in the early 20th century. It is a three-story building with a gable roof, gables, cornices, and blind windows;
- Kleofas Coal Mine workers' hostel (204 Gliwicka Street) – currently the headquarters of the Silesian-Dąbrowa Housing Company. It was constructed in 1907 in the historicist style, then expanded around 1920;
- Building of the Municipal Kindergarten No. 39 (212 Gliwicka Street) – built in the 1930s in the International Style with elements of the Streamline Moderne style;
- Gliwicka Sports Center building (214 Gliwicka Street) – built in the 1930s in the International Style;
- Osiedle Kolonia Mościckiego (236–274 and 278–300 Gliwicka Street – even numbers) – built between 1927 and 1928 in the modern style. It consists of semi-detached single-family homes surrounded by gardens. The buildings are plastered and mostly single-story with a dormer;
- Estate school (276 Gliwicka Street) – opened in 1932, built in the International Style. It is the building of the former Primary School No. 24. The school is plastered, two- and three-story, and topped with a flat roof. It has modest decorations and partially two-story windows;
- Headquarters of the Katowice County Labour Office (14 P. Pośpiech Street) – formerly the Municipal Asylum from 1928. It is a three-story plastered brick building. It originally had brick imitation shutters;
- Factory building (6 Tokarska Street) – from around 1920, in the Neoclassical style. It is a three-story brick structure, partially plastered, with it a giant order of columns and multi-paned window frames;
- Building of Juliusz Słowacki Primary School No. 22 (3 M. Wolski Street) – from the early 20th century. It is a three-story brick building with a ground floor, topped with a gable roof;
- School gymnasium (8 M. Wolski Street) – from 1910 (or 1914) designed by Emil and Georg Zillmann. It is a brick structure, partially plastered, two-story with a basement, and topped with a gable roof. It has a small avant-corps, volutes, pilasters, blind oval windows, and flat hexagonal panels.

=== Monuments and memorial plaques ===
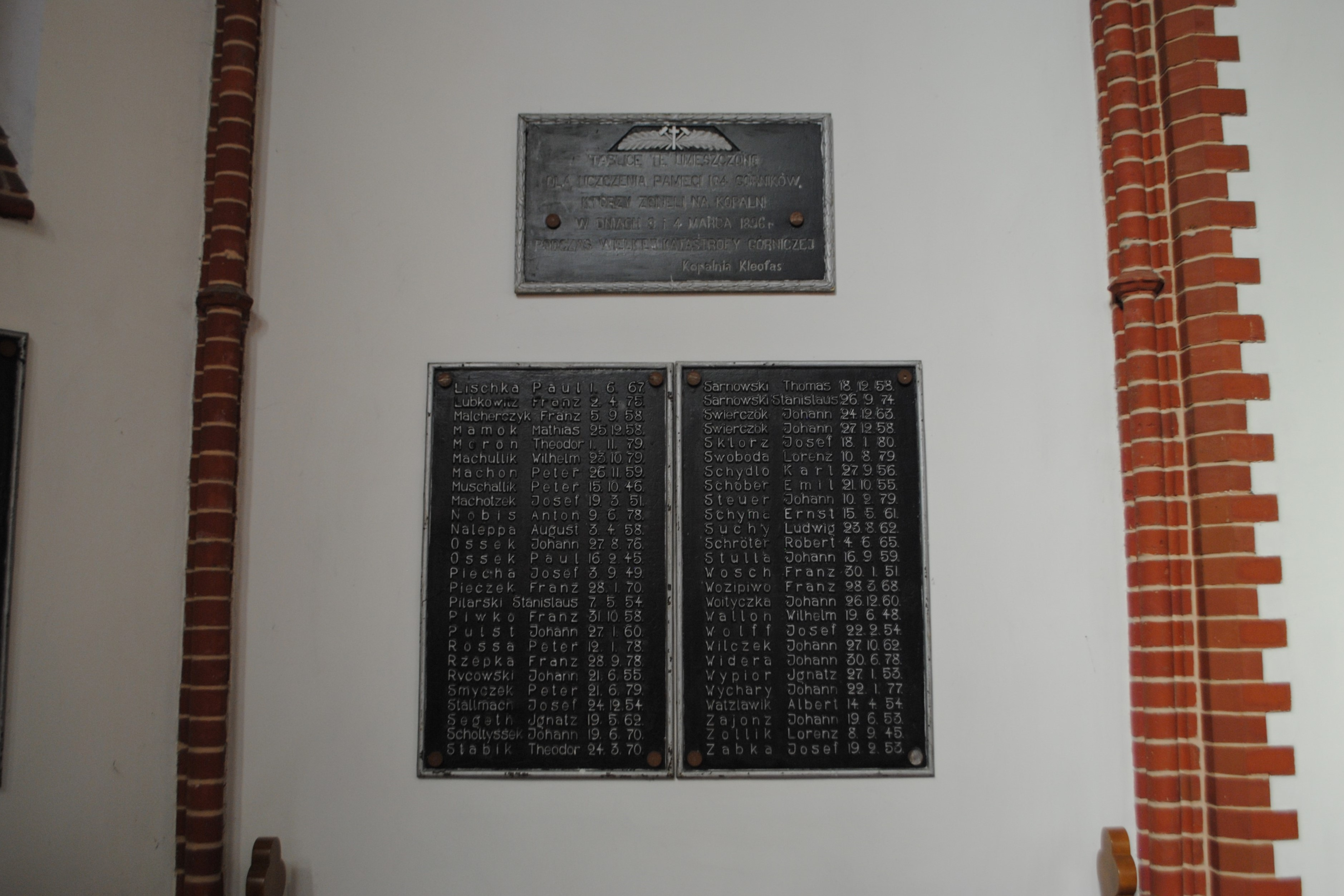
Plaques to the right of the altar of St. Barbara inside the Church of St. Joseph, commemorating the 104 miners who died in the Cleophas Coal Mine disaster (three of five plaques)

- Plaque commemorating Father Józef Kubis, the first parish priest of the Parish of St. Joseph, installed on the 65th anniversary of the consecration of the parish church (in the church porch of the Church of St. Joseph);
- Plaques commemorating the miners who died in the mining disaster at the Cleophas Coal Mine (later Kleofas) on the night of 3 to 4 March 1896 (at the altar of St. Barbara in the Church of St. Joseph);
- Monument (cross with a plaque), commemorating those who died fighting for their homeland's freedom during the Silesian Uprisings and those killed in German concentration camps (in front of the Church of St. Joseph), including Father Karol Kałuża and Jerzy Lis;
- Plaque commemorating the "650th anniversary of the founding of Załęże" (in fact, the anniversary of the first recorded mention of Załęże; on the façade of the former Gmina Załęże office building at 102 Gliwicka Street)
- Obelisk commemorating the "660th anniversary of the founding of Załęże" (in fact, the anniversary of the first recorded mention of Załęże; at the square between M. Ledóchowski and Gliwicka streets);
- Obelisk with a plaque honoring the residents of Upper Silesia and the Dąbrowa Basin who were murdered, persecuted, imprisoned, and deported to forced labor (at J. Londzin Square);
- Plaque commemorating Maria Grzegorzewska, patron of Special Primary School No. 60 (in the building at 148a Gliwicka Street);
- Plaque commemorating the 40th anniversary of the outbreak of the Third Silesian Uprising and the naming of the school after the Silesian Insurgents (in the building of the former Primary School No. 24; 276 Gliwicka Street).

== Culture ==
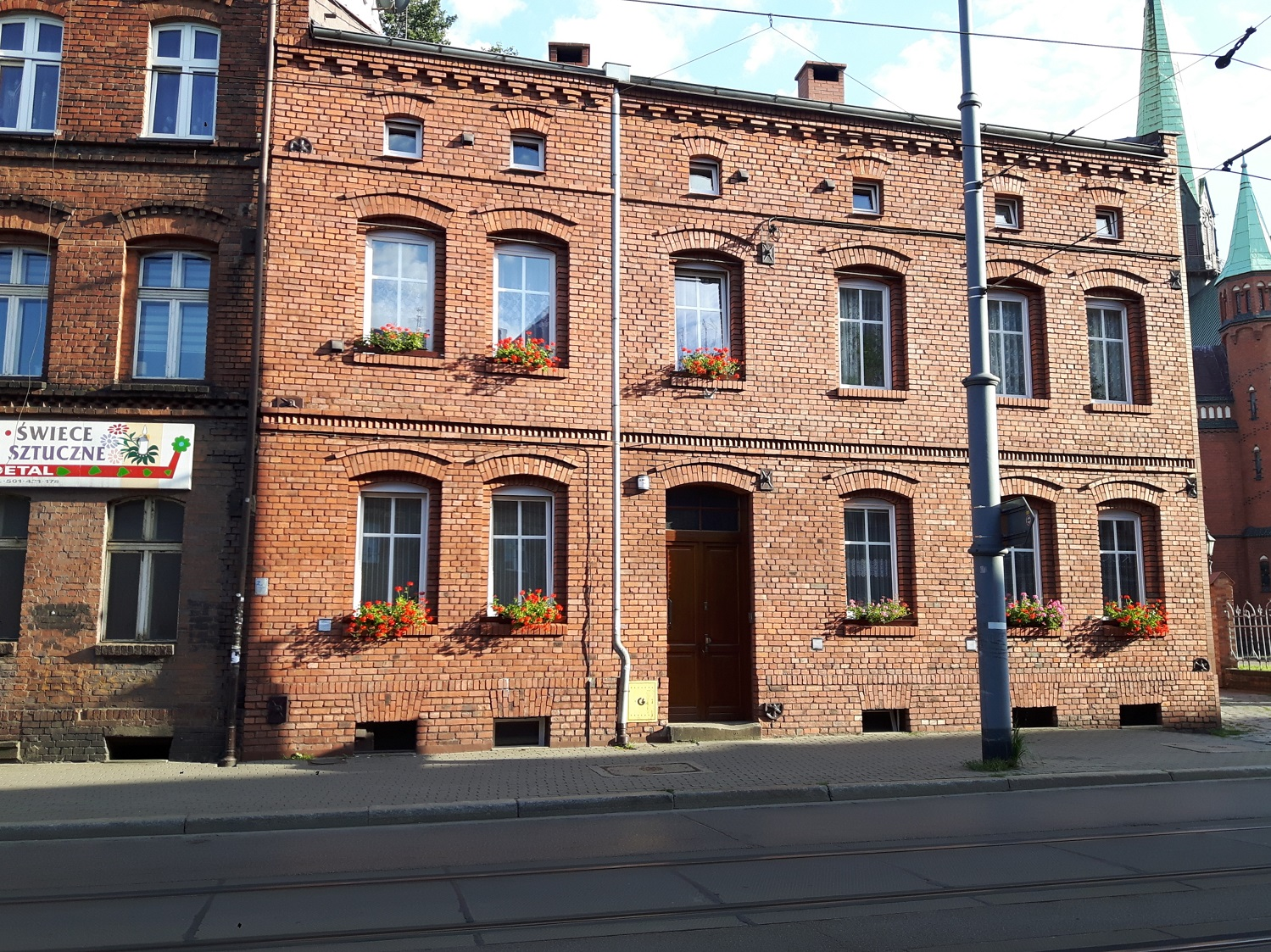
Tenement at 74 Gliwicka Street, where the parish library operated

Organized cultural activities in Załęże gained momentum toward the end of the 19th century. In 1883, Robert Wojtas, Ludwik Łabuz, and Bernard Szołtysik founded the Polish Reading Room, which also ran an amateur theater. In 1893, the Theater Committee was established in Załęże, and in 1908, the Halka Choir, which operated until 1969. The first president of Halka was Kosicki, while its conductors included Józef Budzyński, Leon Poniecki, and Andrzej Różański. In 1906, the Women's Reading Room was established, co-founded by Franciszka Ciemięgowa. In 1910, on the initiative of the parish priest of Załęże, Father Józef Kubis and with the support of the Society of St. Charles Borromeo, a parish library was established. Initially, it contained about 1,000 volumes, including 200 for children. In 1912, the Przyjaźń Choir of the Załęże socialists began its activities, led by Józef Biniszkiewicz.

The following organizations from Załęże, among others, presented their performances at the Reichshalle in Katowice (now the headquarters of the Silesian Philharmonic): the Society of Christian Workers, the Polish Reading Room, the Marian Congregation, the Theatre Committee, the Aloysius Society, the Society of Catholic Husbands and Young Men, the choirs Halka, Wanda, and Wolny Duch, the Jedność Society, the Sokół Gymnastics Society, and the Society of Polish Women.

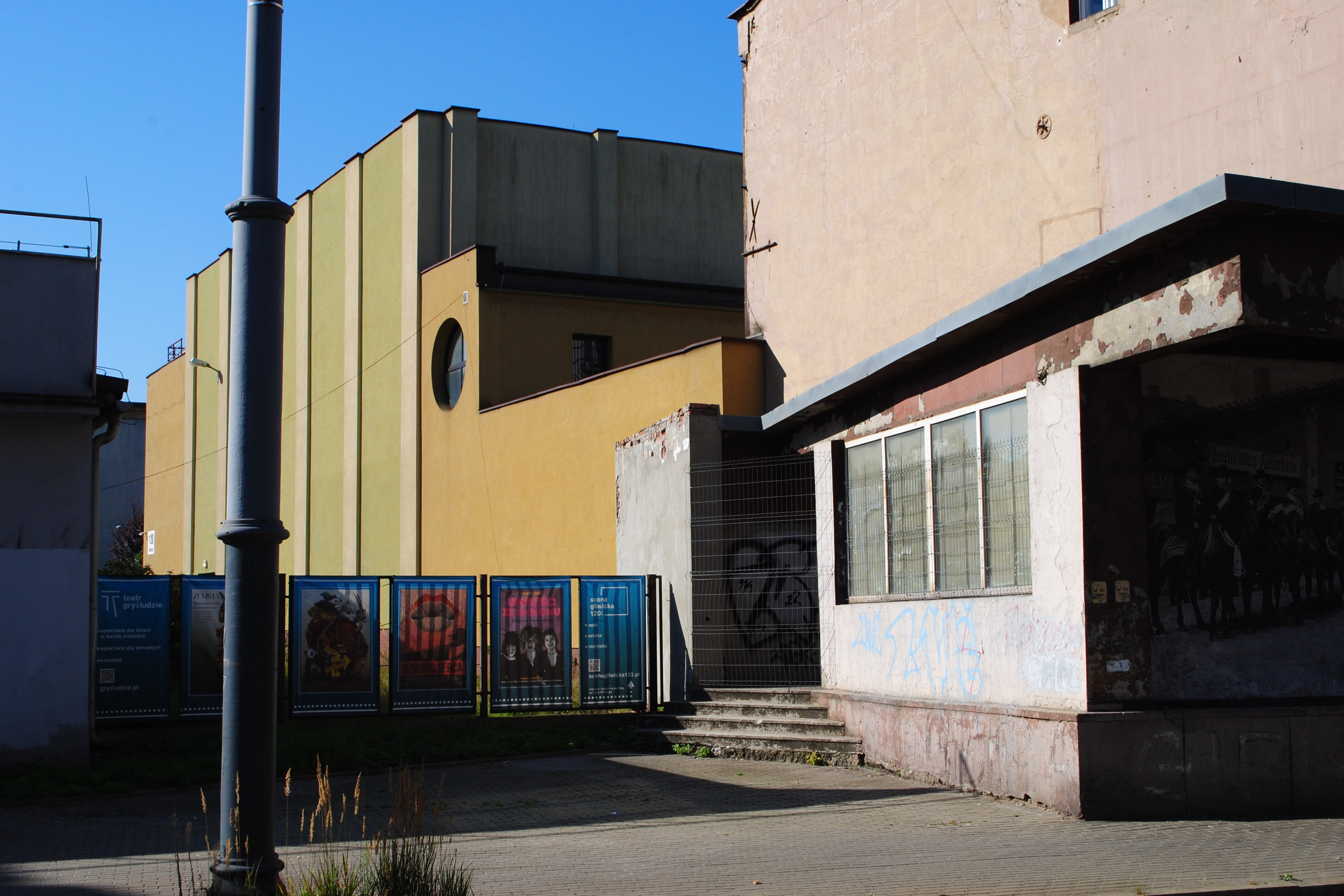
Former Apollo Cinema at 120 Gliwicka Street in 2024

During the interwar period, singing groups were active in Załęże, while existing groups revived their activities, and new ones were formed. Between 1920 and 1923, the Ignacy Jan Paderewski Men's Choir was operating. In 1923, the Fryderyk Chopin Choir was founded (dissolved in 1939), and in 1929, the Echo Choir was established at the Kleofas Coal Mine. The Huta Baildon Men's Choir, founded in 1926, had 405 members by 1939. In 1930, the Stanisław Moniuszko Choir was established.

During the interwar period, one of the branch libraries of the People's Libraries Society operated in Załęże. In 1935, it held a collection of 1,047 volumes, which were used by 147 readers. At that time, the Raj Cinema (formerly Corso) was also established. It took the name "Apollo" around 1944 and was located at 120 Gliwicka Street. Its first owner was Joanna Gawlik. In the 1960s, the auditorium could seat 365–381 viewers, and in 1970, nearly 76,000 people attended screenings at the cinema.

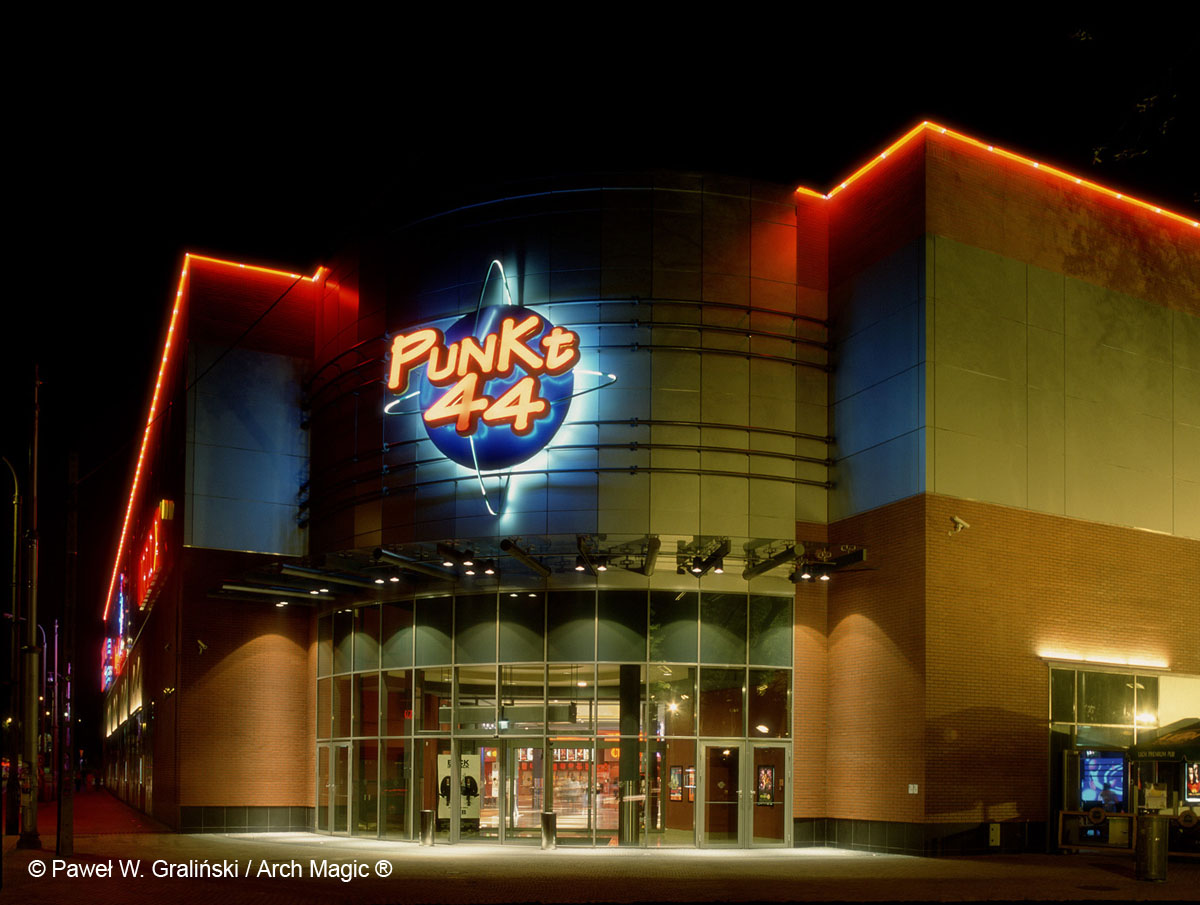
Punkt 44 entertainment center in 2007, built next to the Workers' Cultural Center of the Baildon Steelworks, demolished in 2001

In 1945, the Feliks Dzierżyński Factory Club was established at the Baildon Steelworks; it was soon renamed the Baildon Steelworks Cultural Center. In the 1960s, a new club was constructed at 46 Gliwicka Street. The facility hosted educational and cultural activities, such as foreign language classes and music lessons. Additionally, it housed, among other things, the Veteran Workers' Club, a library, and musical ensembles, including Anonim, the Mandolin Players Ensemble, and the Florentynki women's vocal ensemble. The building of the former community center was demolished in 2001.

In July 1949, Branch No. 3 of the Katowice Municipal Public Library began operations, and its headquarters were originally located in a building at 88 Gliwicka Street. Initially, it occupied a single room, and from 1 August 1952, the branch had an additional room at its disposal. From 1991 to 1999, it was located in the staff housing building of the Kleofas Coal Mine workers' hostel at 204 Gliwicka Street; in 2000, it moved to a new location at 93 Gliwicka Street, which had been thoroughly renovated.

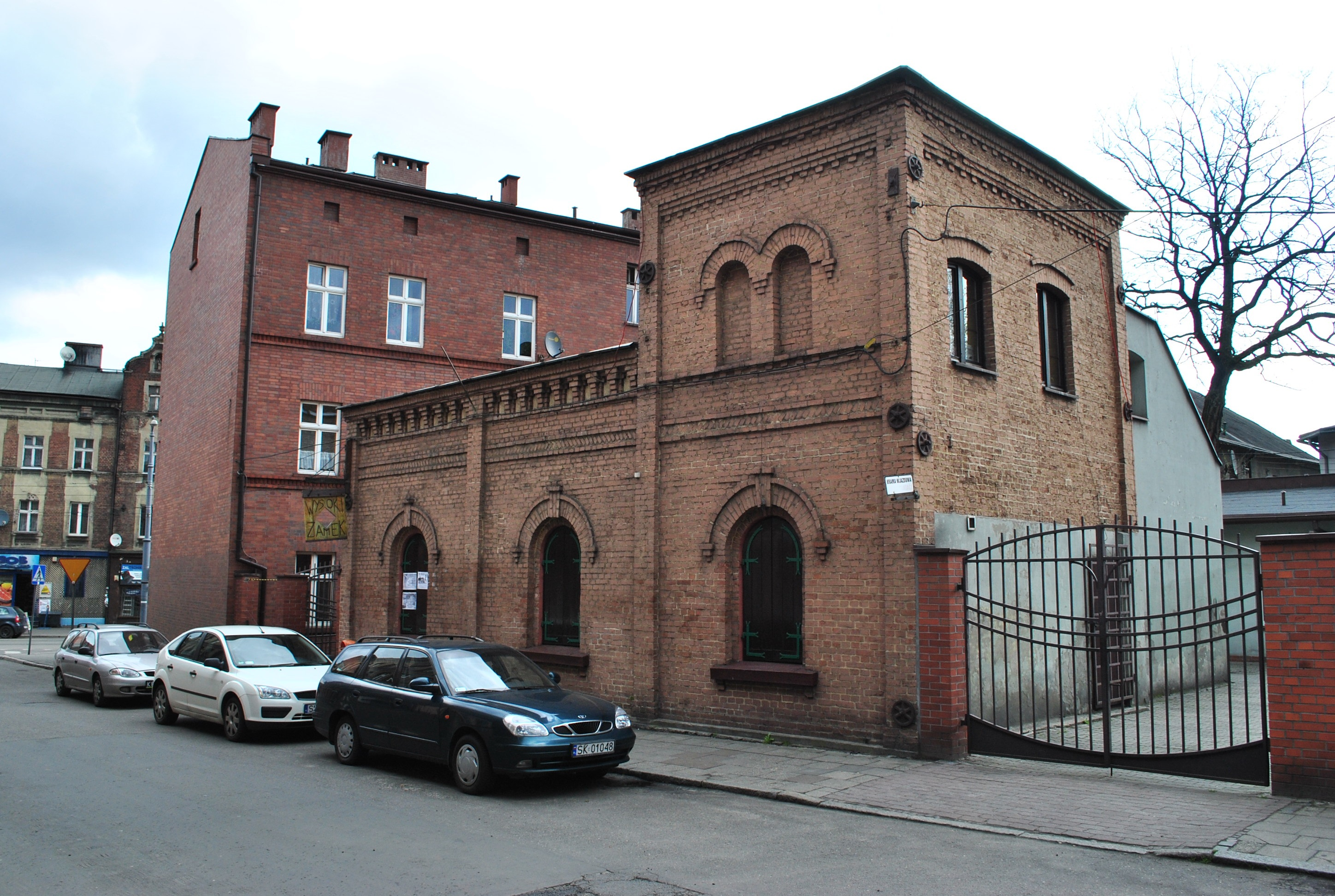
Wysoki Zamek Club at 96 Gliwicka Street (view from W. Janas Street)

The Youth Cultural Center, located within School and Educational Complex No. 2, carried on some of the traditions of the Jordan garden. From 1960 to 1973, it operated as the Children's and Youth Cultural Center. Since the 1970s, the following groups have been active there: the PTTK Youth Club, the ZHP Song and Dance Ensemble, the Inter-School Sports Club with soccer and track and field sections, the Model-Making Workshop, the Ptyś Cinema, a day-care center, and the Absolwent club. During the 2005–2006 school year, the building was renovated, with the addition of a computer lab, among other things, and the premises were also modernized. On 1 September 2017, the Youth Cultural Center and Tadeusz Rejtan Primary School No. 20 were merged into a single institution: School and Educational Complex No. 2, and the former building was repurposed for sports activities.

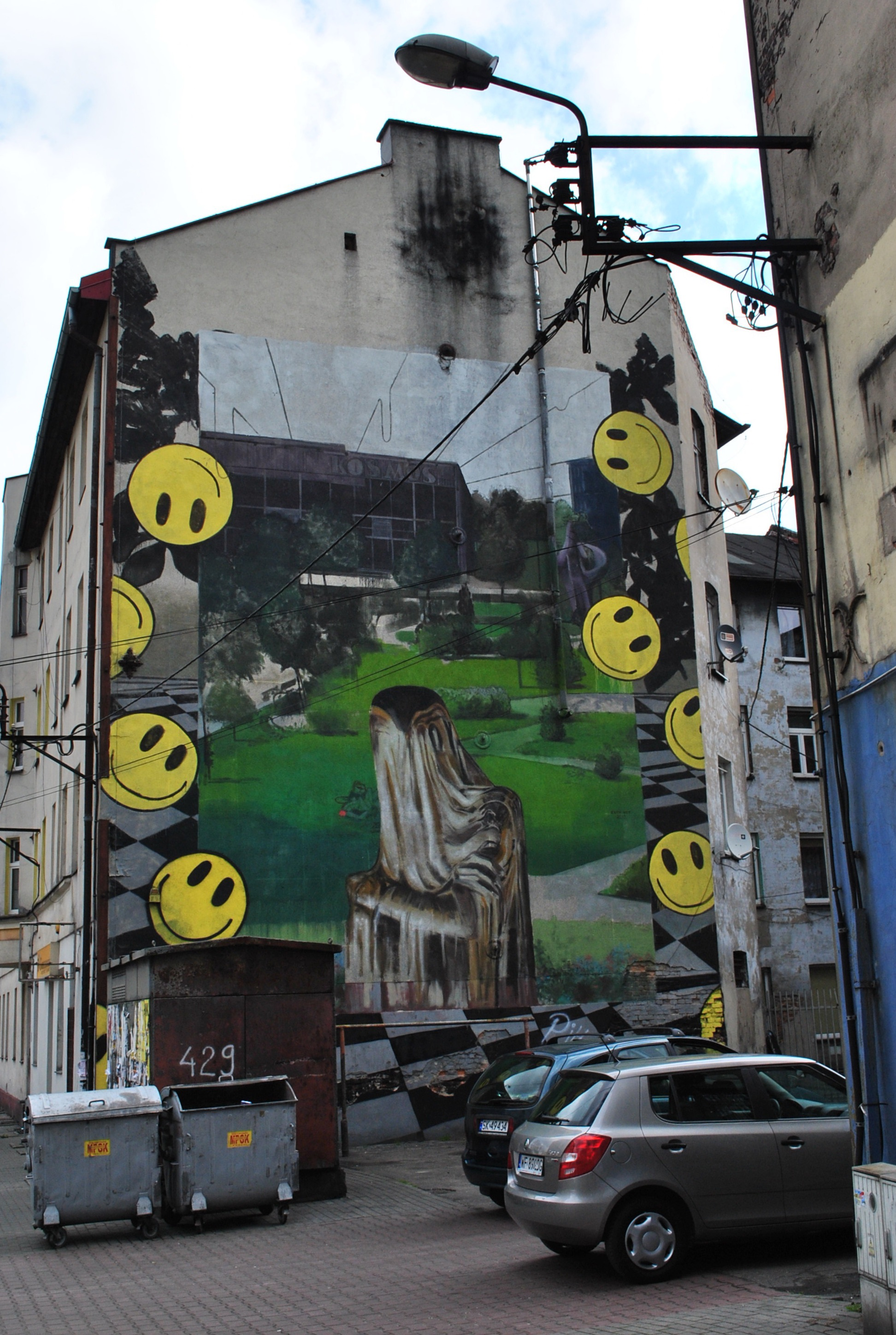
Mural on a tenement on Anioła Street

On 5 July 2002, the first multiplex in Katowice, Punkt 44 (housing IMAX and Cinema City cinemas), was opened at 44 Gliwicka Street. In the same year, on 23 May, the Wysoki Zamek Club began operations. It is a club for addicted youth, serving a preventive function, and as part of its activities, it organizes various concerts, meetings, and artistic events.

In 2009 and 2014, Katowice organized the "Space for Culture" initiative, under which it offered spaces for rent for cultural activities. Two spaces were made available during the two editions of the competition. A ceramics studio was located at 99 Gliwicka Street, while the building at 58 Gliwicka Street was rented by the Hyperion Gallery Foundation. The Zielone Załęże Association, which has been more active since 2019, is also involved in cultural, sports, and community-building activities.

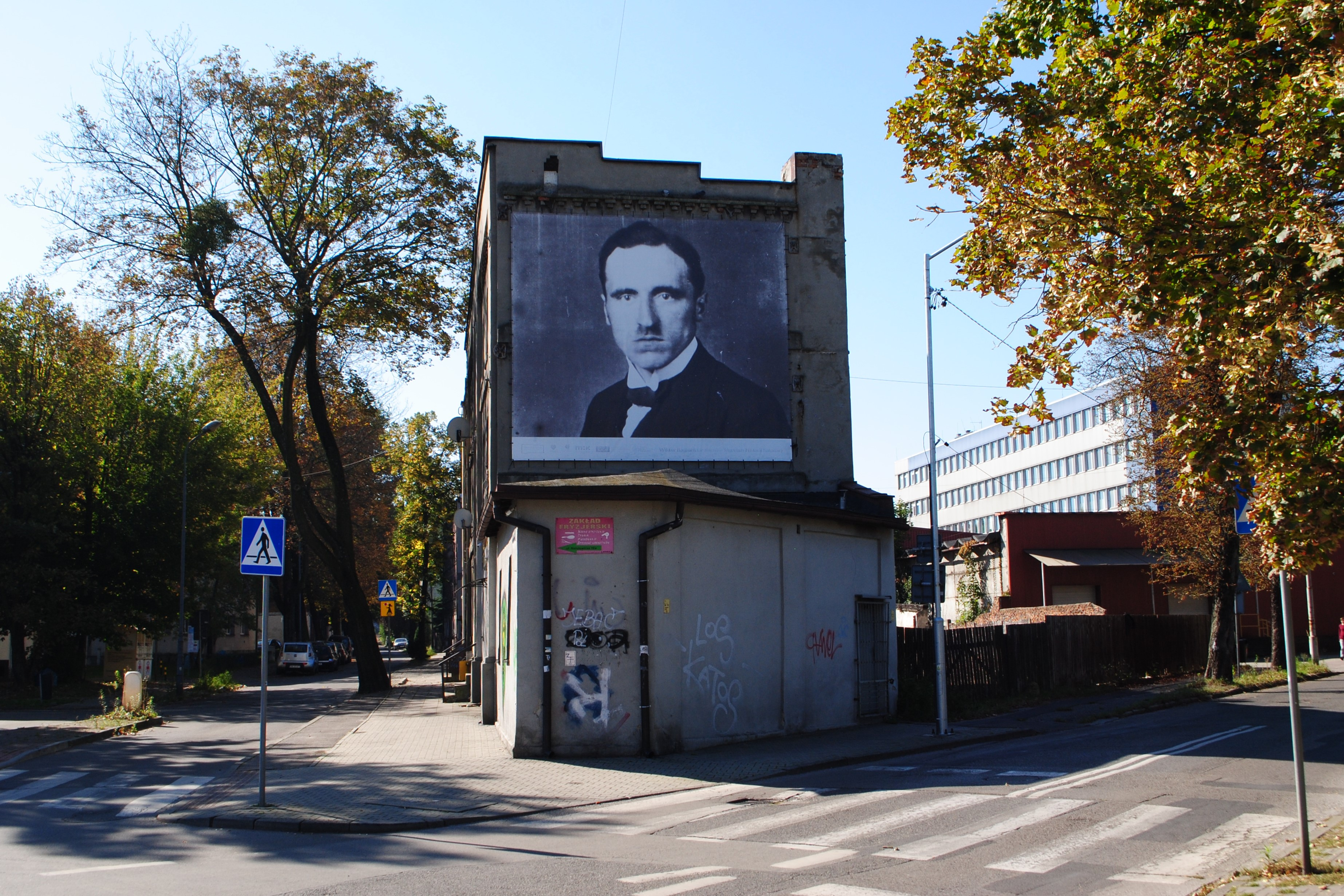
Banner featuring Wiktor Baranek at the junction of G. Narutowicz and P. Pośpiech streets (2024)

One of the recurring events in Załęże are also the Załęże Days. As part of these celebrations, various sporting, artistic, and religious events are organized, with the help of local organizations as well as the District Council.

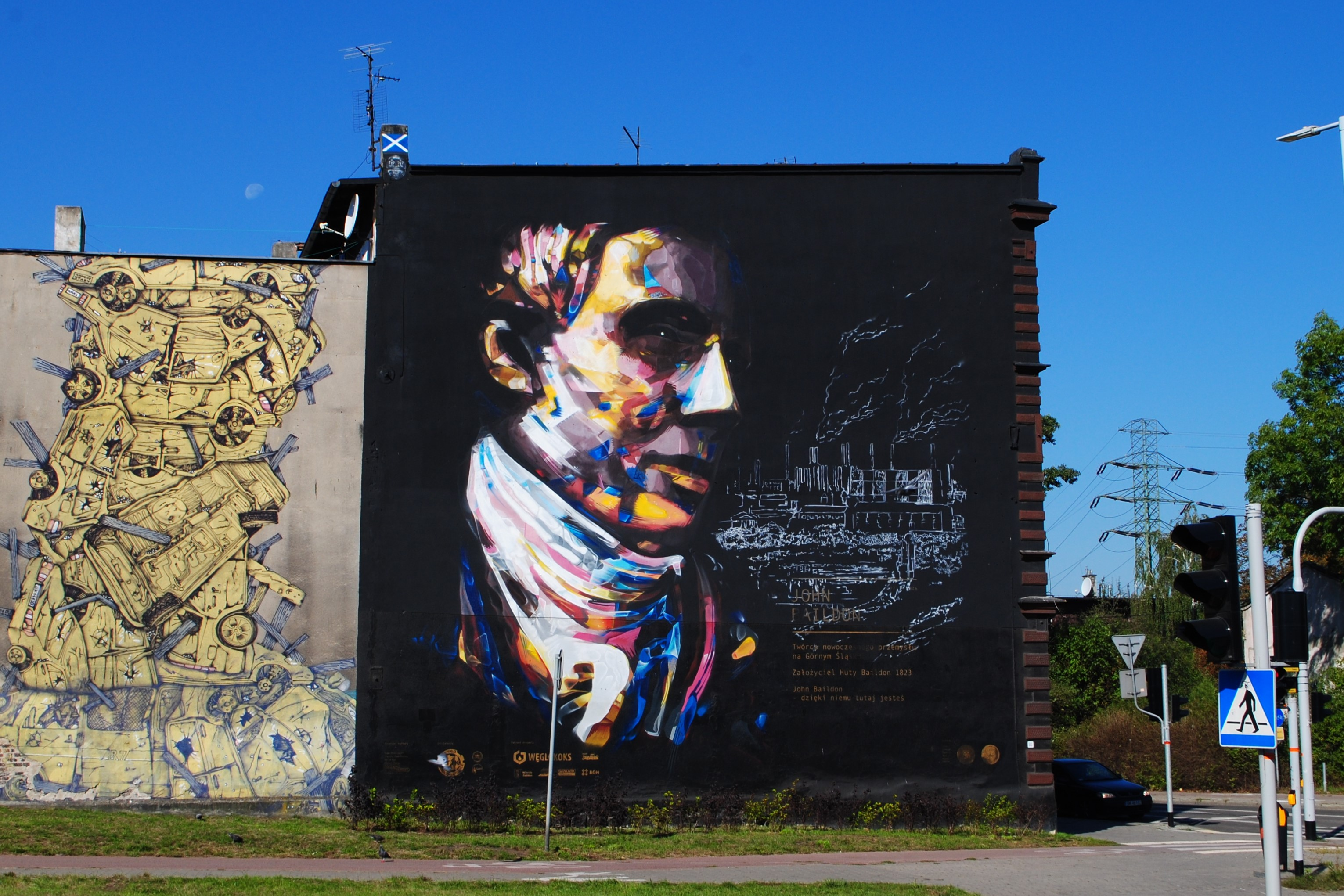
Mural commemorating John Baildon on the wall of the tenement at 146 Gliwicka Street (2024)

As part of the District Gallery of Independence project, organized by Katowice City of Gardens, a banner with an image of Wiktor Baranek has been displayed on the wall of a tenement on G. Narutowicz Street. In addition, the district has murals depicting both well-known figures and abstract motifs. They can be found, among others, on the walls of tenements at 58 (on the eastern wall depicting Dr. Jolanta Wadowska-Król, and on the western wall depicting Scoutmaster Jerzy Lis), 146 (with John Baildon), and 148 Gliwicka Street (a building entirely decorated with a mural depicting forest spirits and fairy-tale creatures), as well as on the following streets: 14 J. Kupiec Street (a monumental depiction of a child's drawing from 2014 by Zosia, who was five years old at the time), 3 Lelewela Street (from 2013 by a British artist known as Mobstr), and 3 Macieja Street (created in 2022 by the Lviv artist Bogdana Davydiuk, referencing the Russo-Ukrainian war).

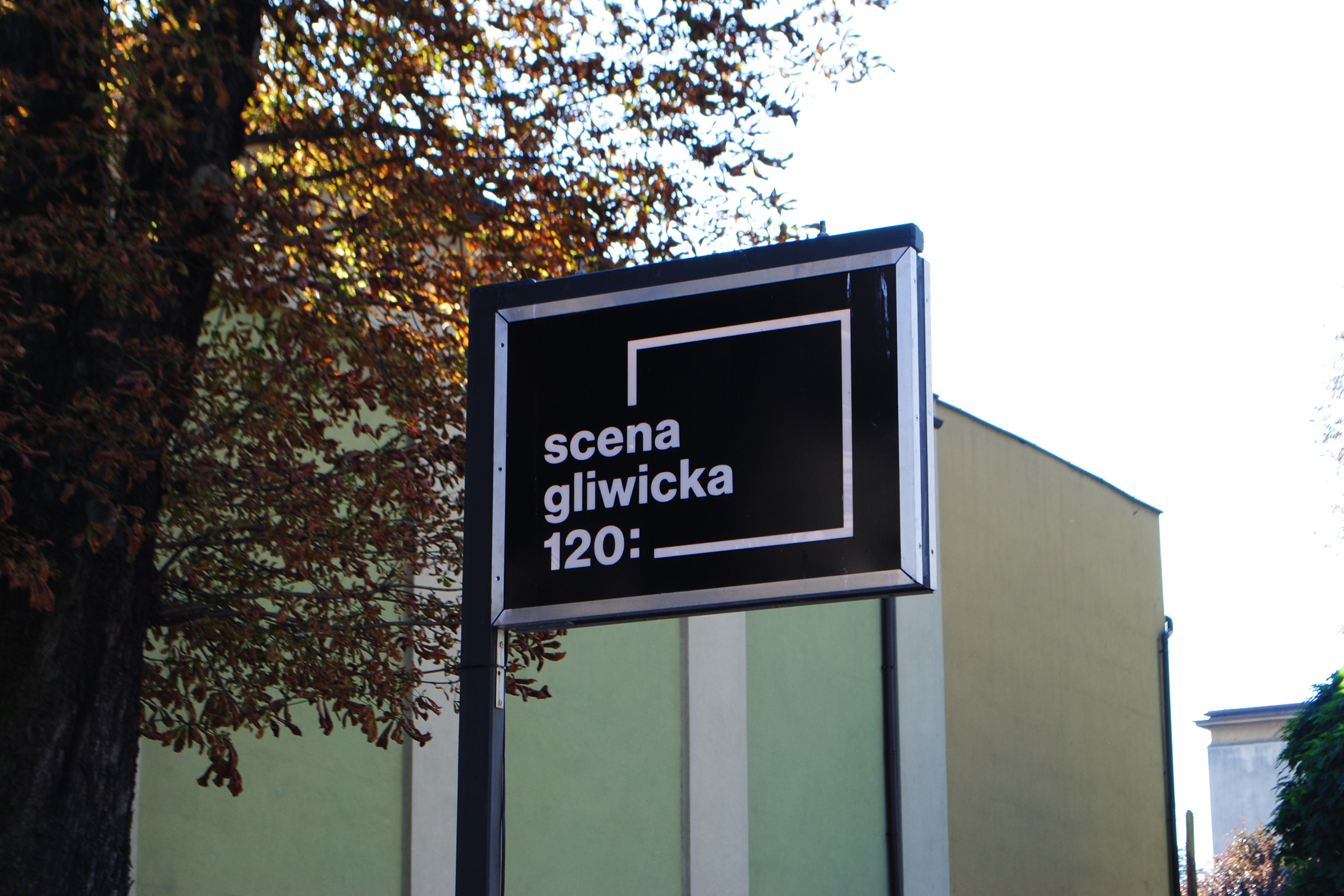
Sign with the logo of Scena Gliwicka 120

There are two theaters based in Załęże. Since 2021, the Żelazny Theatre, founded on the initiative of Piotr Wiśniewski, has been located in the former school at 148a Gliwicka Street, while on 5 March 2023, the opening ceremony of Scena Gliwicka 120 – the new home of the Gry i Ludzie Theatre – took place in the building of the former Apollo Cinema building at 120 Gliwicka Street.

Artists from various cultural fields lived in Załęże or had ties to the town, including, among others: director Janusz Kidawa (who lived at 127 Gliwicka Street) and writers Henryk Ciemięga (who moved to Załęże in 1904), Ginter Pierończyk (who grew up on Pokoju Street), and Bernadeta Prandzioch (a resident of Załęże).

=== In literature ===
Załęże is mentioned in the novel Ptaki ptakom by Wilhelm Szewczyk, which recounts the battles fought by the defenders of Katowice against the German invaders in the first days of September 1939, and in the book Wieża spadochronowa by Kazimierz Gołba, while in the novel Der grosse Jania by Arnold Ulitz, the main character operates in Załęże. Ginter Pierończyk also described the history of the district and some of its families in his works. Between 2014 and 2017, as part of the so-called "Załęże Trilogy", he wrote three books: Asty kasztana, Synek z familoka, and Kleofas w życiorys wpisany.

== Education ==
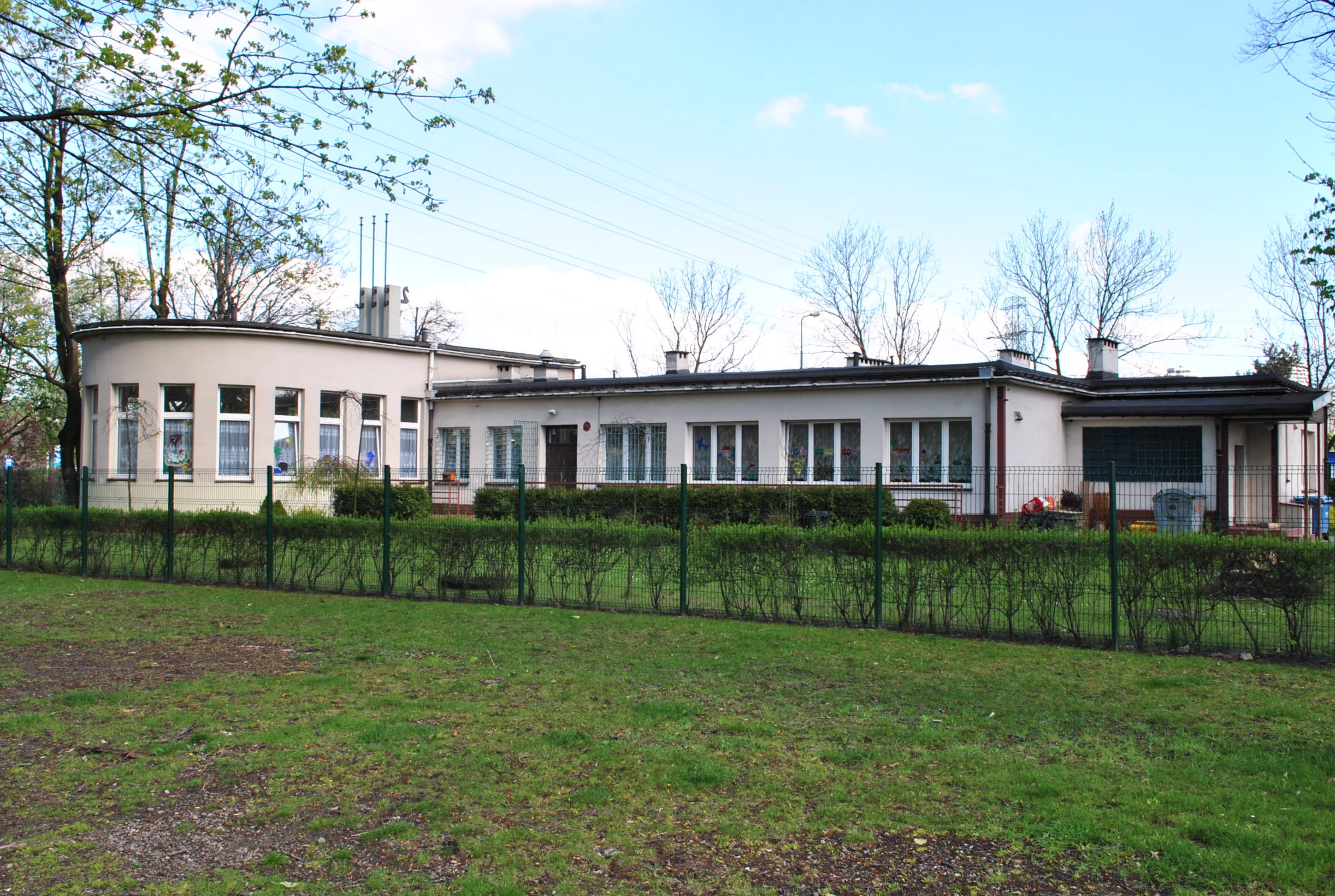
Municipal Kindergarten No. 39 (212 Gliwicka Street)

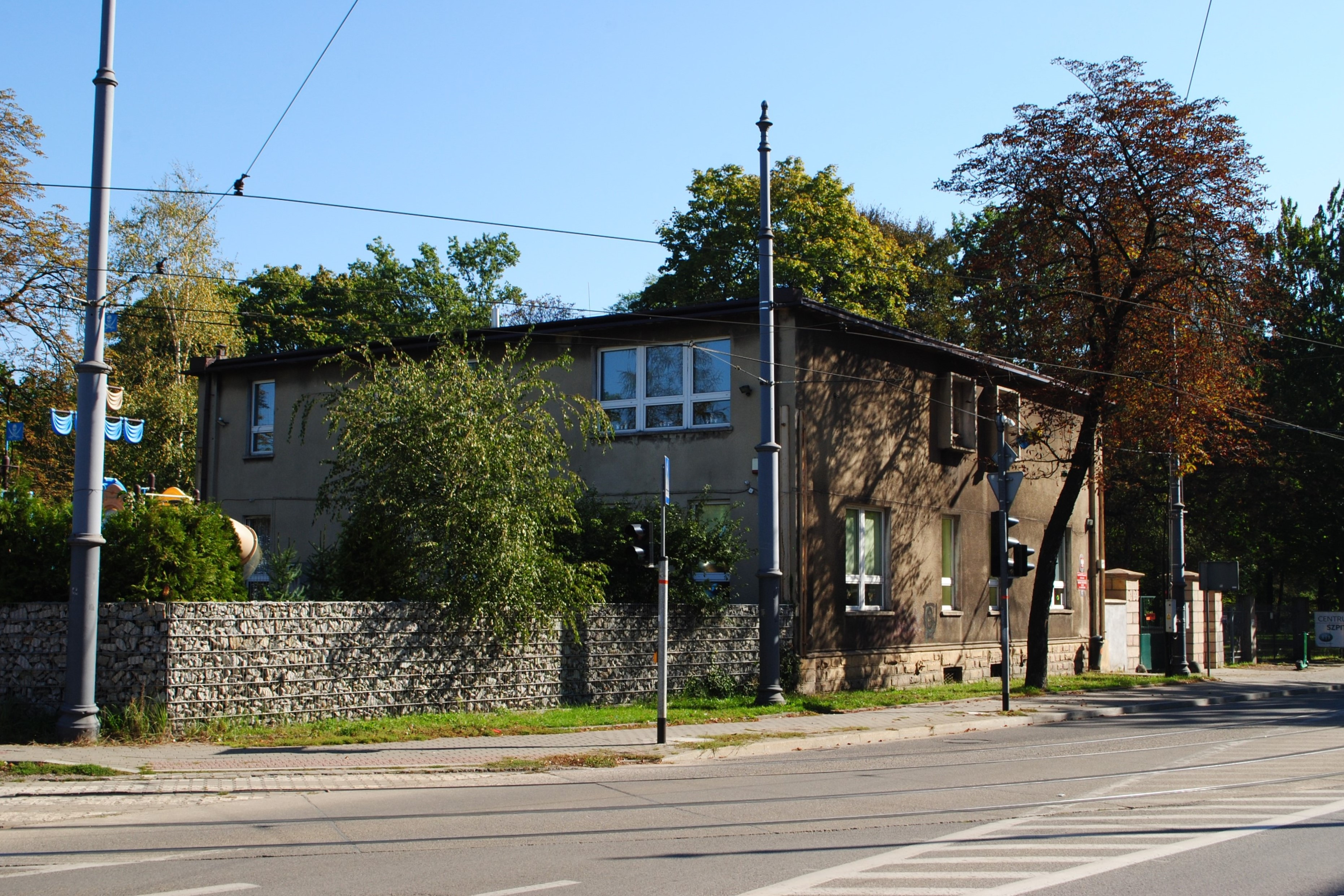
Municipal Kindergarten No. 30 (157 Gliwicka Street)

As of November 2024, the following educational and childcare facilities are in operation in Załęże:

- Kindergartens:
  - Secret Garden Municipal Kindergarten No. 39 (212 Gliwicka Street),
  - Małe Kroczki Kindergarten Academy (12 Ondraszka Street);
- Primary schools:
  - Juliusz Słowacki Primary School No. 22 (3 M. Wolski Street),
  - Upper Silesian Nobel Laureates Omega Community Primary School (276 Gliwicka Street);
- School complexes:
  - School and Educational Facilities Complex No. 2 (2 J. Zarębski Street), comprising:
    - Marian Mróz Municipal Kindergarten No. 26 (2 J. Zarębski Street),
    - Municipal Kindergarten No. 30 (157 Gliwicka Street),
    - Tadeusz Rejtan Primary School No. 20 (2 J. Zarębski Street),
  - Stanisław Mastalerz School Complex No. 7 (228 Gliwicka Street), comprising:
    - Technical School No. 7,
    - Vocational School of the First Grade No. 5.

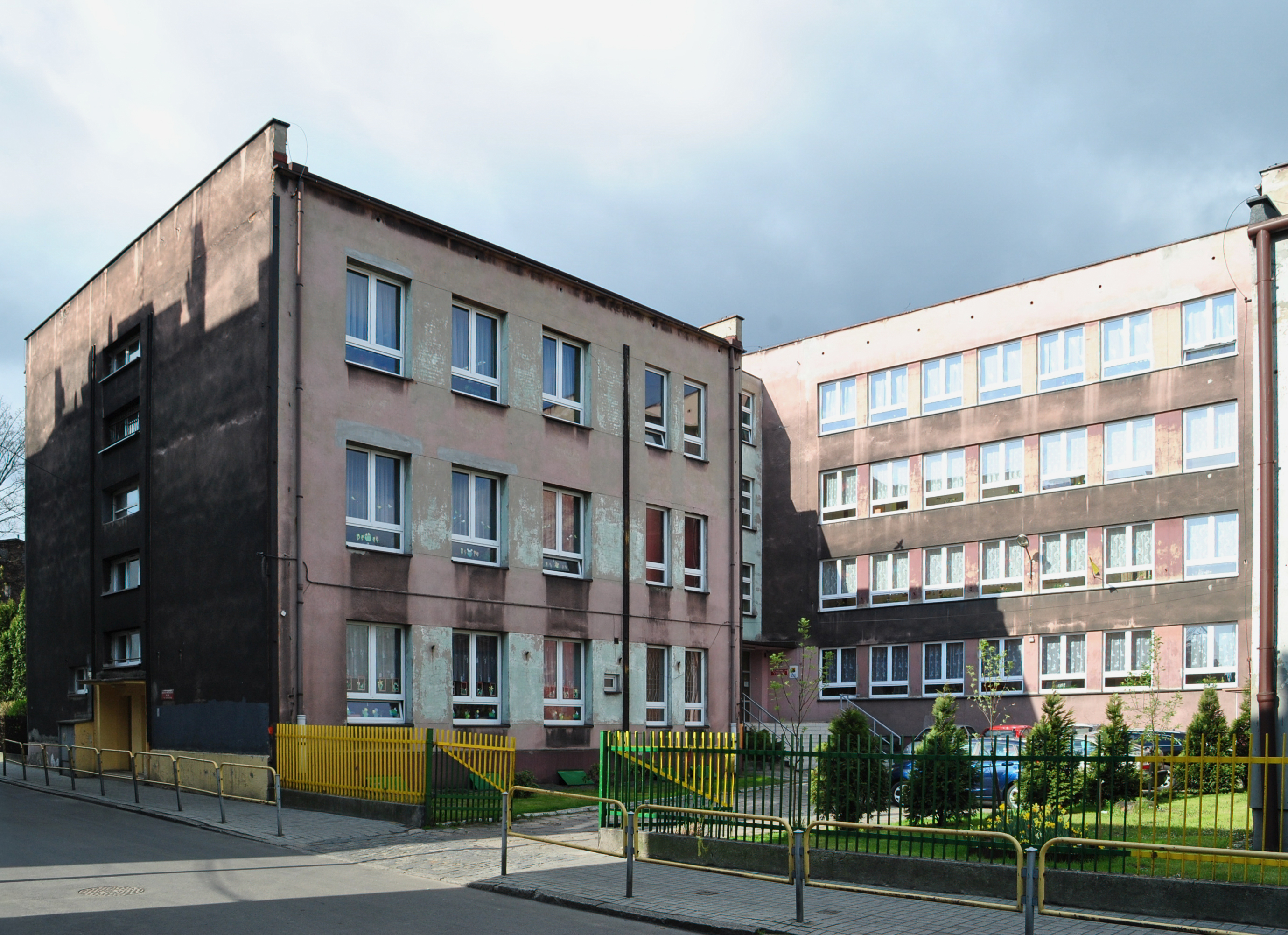
T. Rejtan Primary School No. 2 (2 J. Zarębski Street)

Originally, during the Prussian period, children from Załęże belonged to the school district in Bogucice, where there was a rural school dating back to the 15th century. Post-inspection reports from 1793 noted that 15 children from Załęże attended it. The beginnings of education in Załęże itself, however, date back to 1827, when the first school was established in a wooden, two-room cottage located where J. Zarębski Street would later be built, and the school's first teacher, Franciszek Zarębski, lived in one of the rooms. He served as a teacher until 1834, after which Jerzy Cichoń succeeded him. In the 1830s, 102 children attended the school, of whom about 15 did so regularly. This was mainly because a large number of these children were already employed from the age of 10 to work on the Załęże folwark.

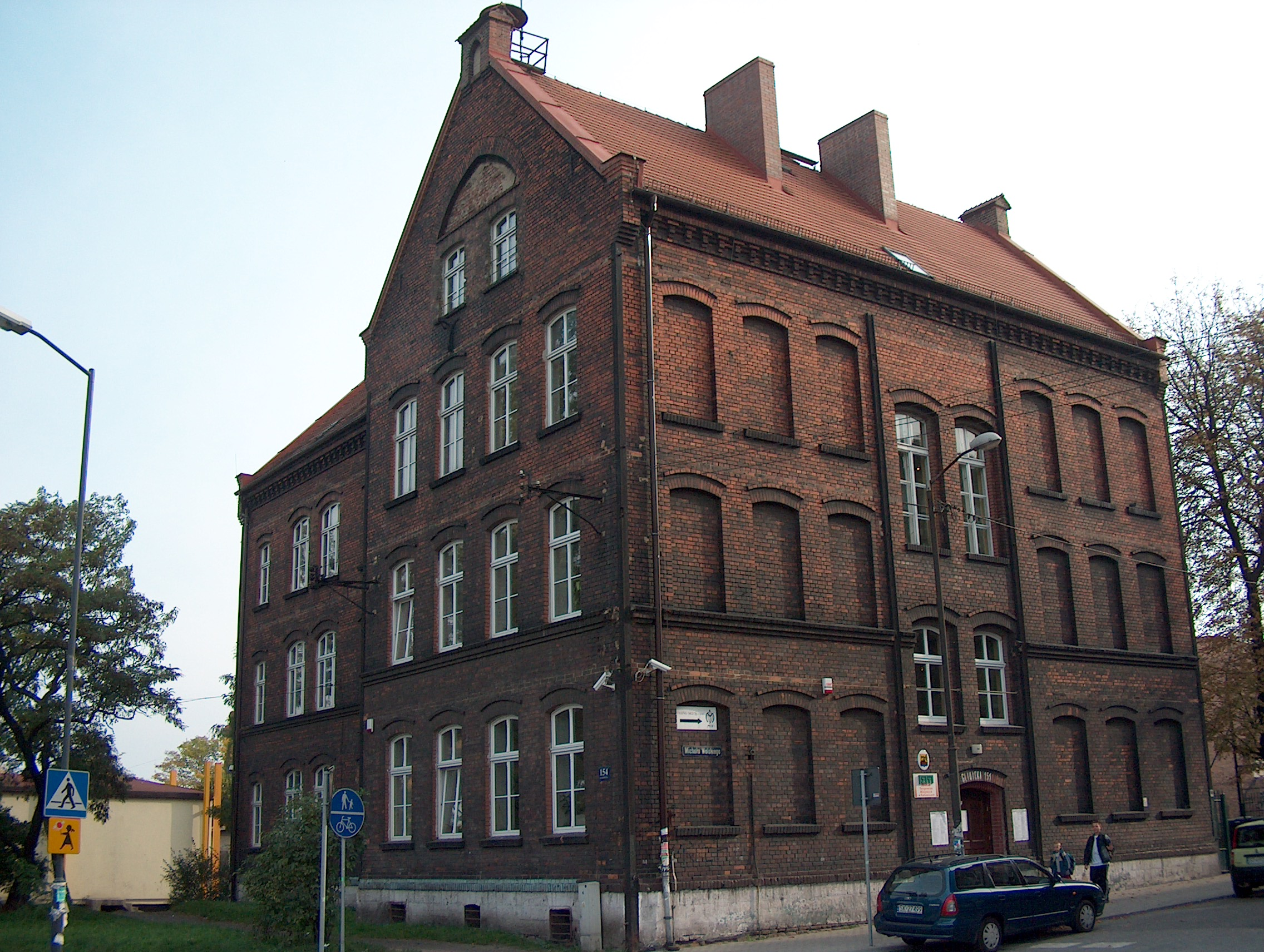
No-longer-existing Primary School No. 21, located at 154 Gliwicka Street (2007)

The growth of industry in Załęże led to an influx of residents and, consequently, an increase in the number of children attending the local school. By 1839, there were already 235 students, and this number continued to rise. In 1860, a new brick school building was constructed, as the existing one had become too cramped. That same year, two teachers worked at the Załęże school – Walenty Kosała and Karol Kammel. They taught in Polish until 1872, while German-language education continued in Załęże from 1873 to 1922. In 1861, 311 children were enrolled in two classes. Between 1876 and 1877, another school building was erected. In 1893, 1,073 children were enrolled in 14 classes at Public School No. I (later Primary School No. 20 at 2 J. Zarębski Street).

In 1893, a plot of land was purchased on what would later become M. Wolski Street, where construction of a new school began. The building of Public School No. II (later Primary School No. 21 at 154 Gliwicka Street) was opened on 8 November 1894 by Father Ludwik Skowronek of Bogucice. The school itself, however, was established in 1887.

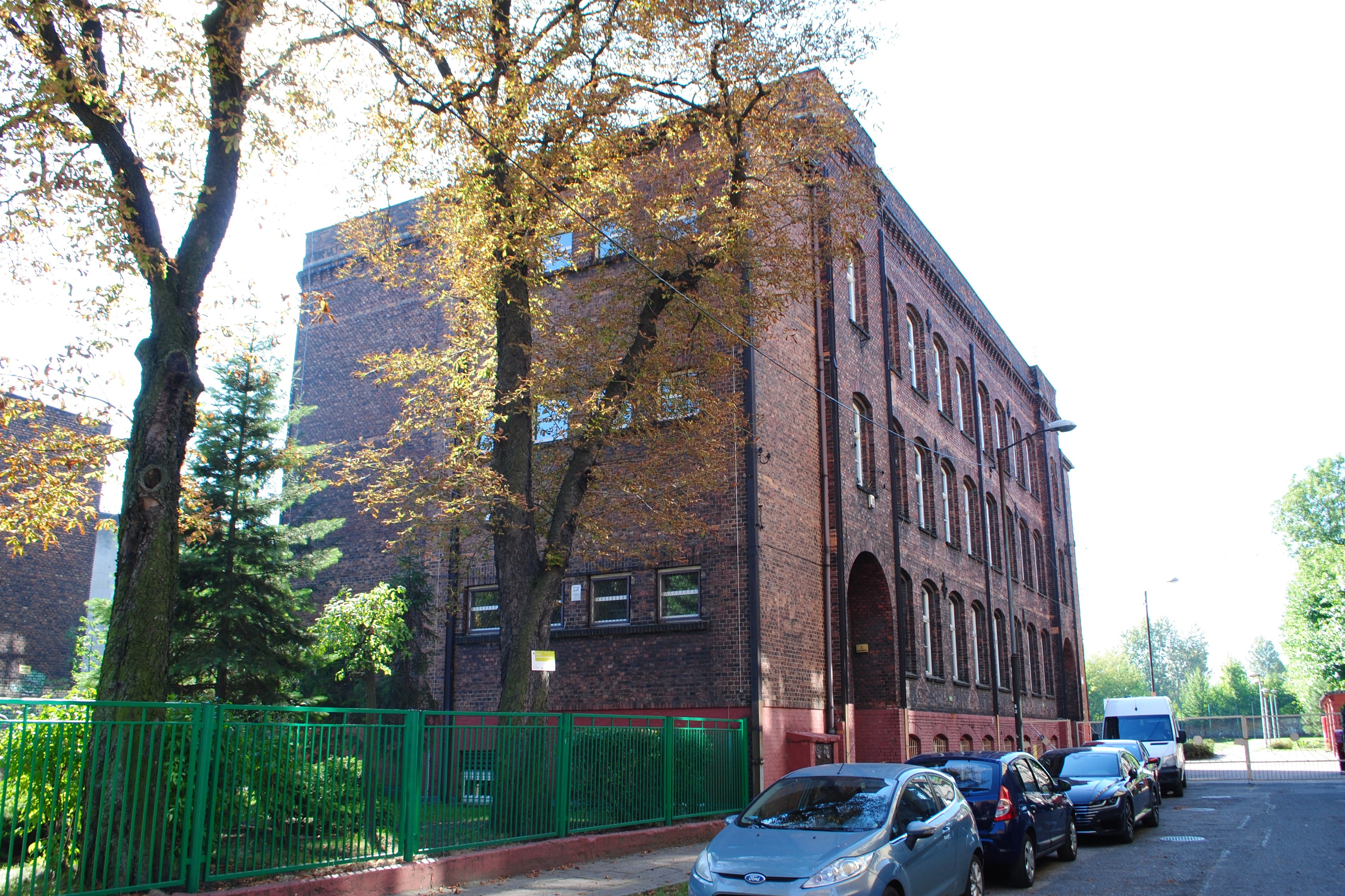
J. Słowacki Primary School No. 22, built in 1904 (2024)

To further relieve overcrowding in the schools of Załęże, thanks to the efforts of Aniela Langner and Wiktor Baranek, another school building was completed in 1904 – Public School No. III (later Primary School No. 22 at 3 M. Wolski Street), and in 1908, the later Primary School No. 23 at 148a Gliwicka Street. Also in 1908, a two-class Evangelical school was established in Załęże, employing two teachers. By 1914, there were five Catholic schools (including one in Załęska Hałda) and one Evangelical school operating within Gmina Załęże.

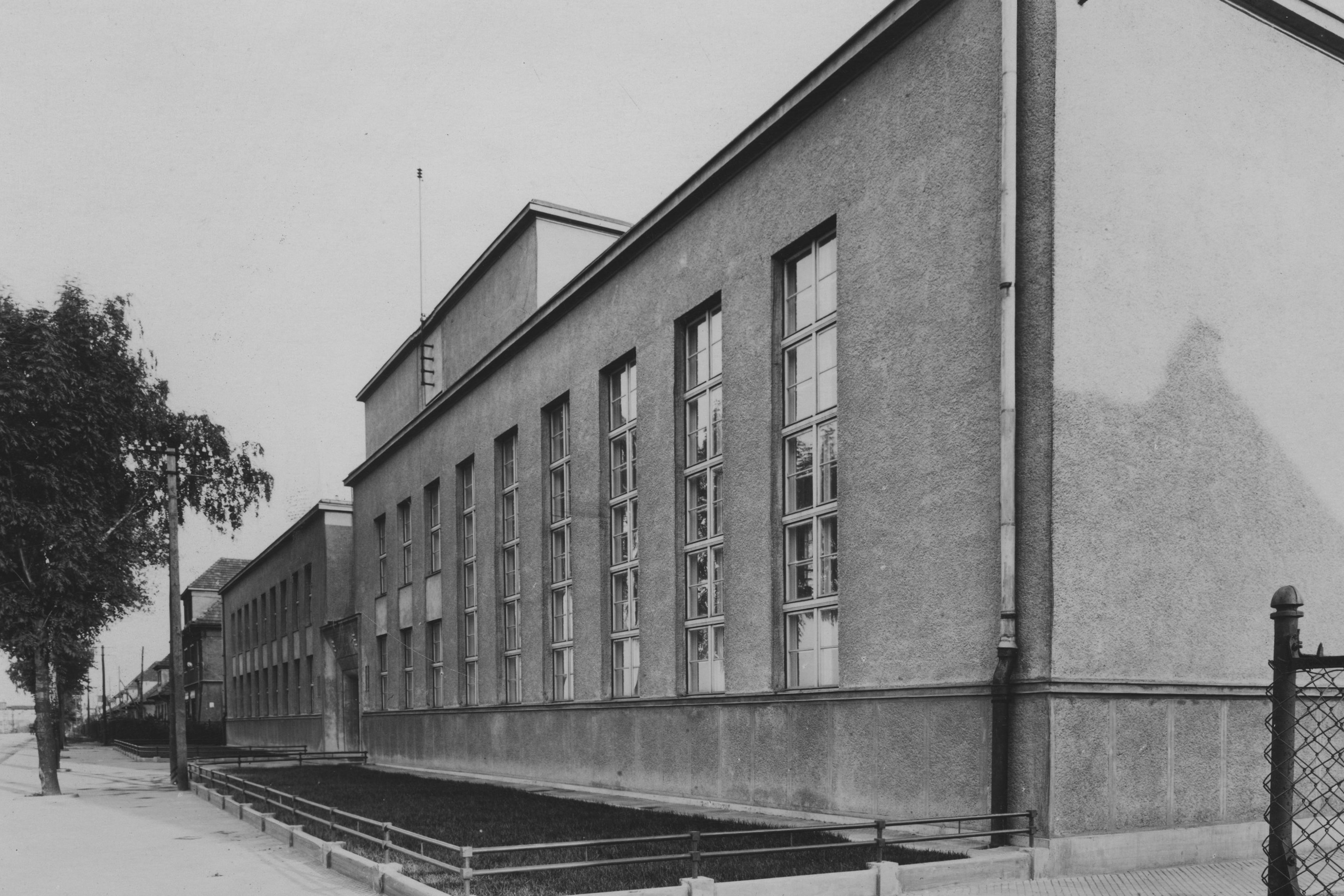
Silesian Insurgents Primary School No. 24 in 1932

During the interwar period, the education system underwent a process of Polonization; German teaching staff were gradually replaced by Polish teachers, and schools were named after Polish figures. From 28 September 1920, children at what would later become Primary School No. 22 could study Polish twice a week, and in 1922, the school was named after Juliusz Słowacki. On 1 September 1924, the later Primary School No. 20 resumed operations as a Polish institution (it had been suspended since 2 August 1919), and on 21 March 1925, Tadeusz Rejtan became its patron. In 1925, the later Primary School No. 21 was named after Józef Lompa, and in 1928 it was converted into a boys' school. Later that same year, a nursery school began operating there, and one classroom was made available to the Gabriel Narutowicz School for the German-Speaking Minority.

The building that would later become Primary School No. 22 housed, among other things, the Sokół Sports Club led by Matylda Ossadnik. On 1 September 1932, the school changed from a coeducational institution to a girls' school. On the same day, a public school was opened in Osiedle Kolonia Mościckiego, which the following year was named after the same patron as the entire estate. In the 1934/1935 school year, 505 children studied there, including some from outside the estate.

During World War II, education in Załęże was conducted in German. After the war, further changes took place in the school system in the district. In 1962, Primary School No. 22 was named after Anastazy Kowalczyk and became the first school in Katowice to receive a banner. In 1961, Primary School No. 24, which had been without a patron since 1945, was named after the Silesian Insurgents. On 1 February 1962, Special Primary School No. 60 was established, originally located at 148a Gliwicka Street. 84 children began their education there, and on 7 May 1970, Maria Grzegorzewska became the patron of the school.

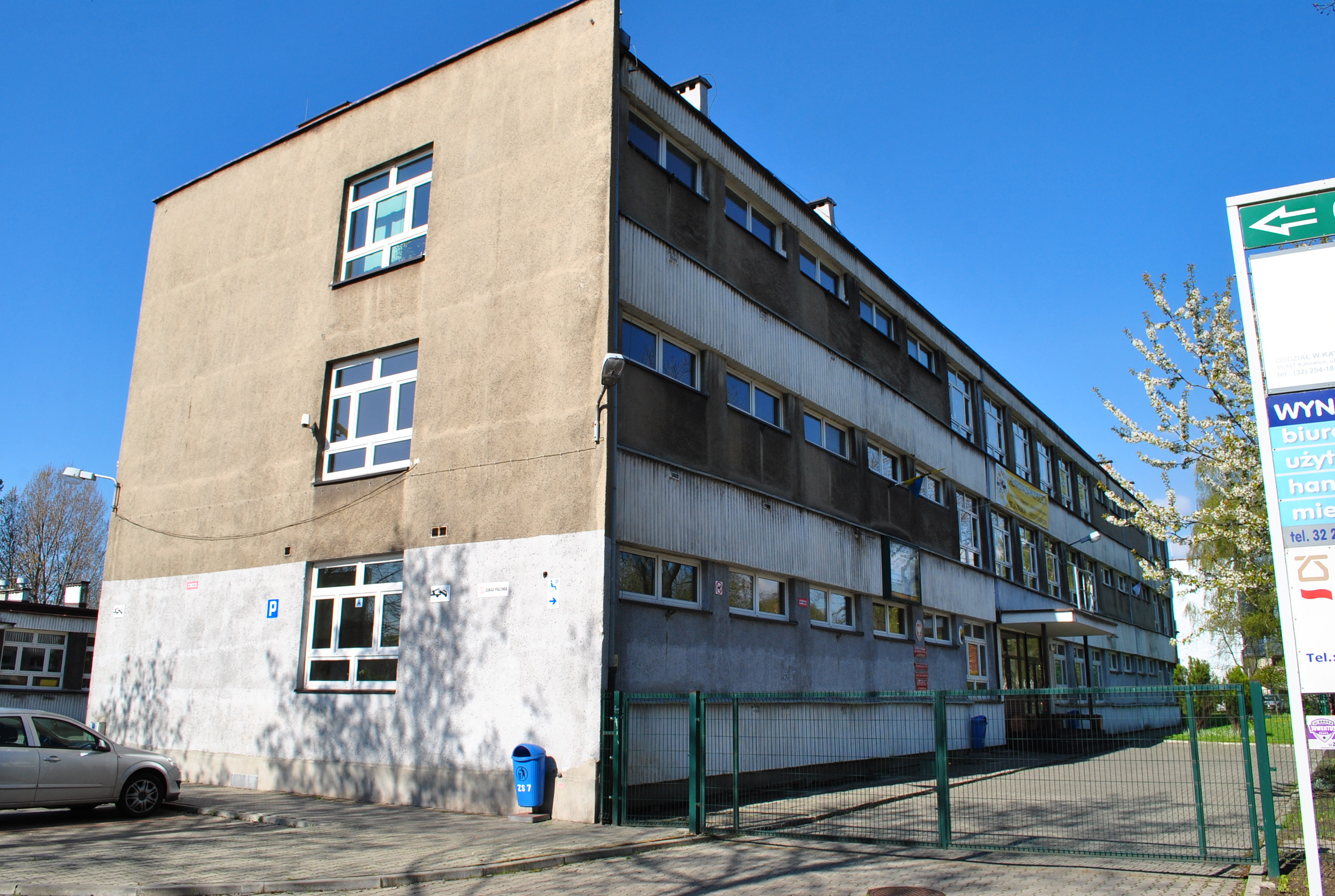
S. Mastalerz School Complex No. 7 (228 Gliwicka Street)

On 1 September 1963, the Basic Vocational School for Employees of the Provincial Transport Company in Katowice was established; its headquarters were originally located on Sokolskia Street. The school moved to its new facility at 228 Gliwicka Street in 1977, and its name was changed to the Katowice Transport School Complex and named after Stanisław Mastalerz. On 1 September 1966, the new building of Primary School No. 20 was officially opened, and its older section was converted into a kindergarten. In the same year, Jan Kochanowski Primary School No. 23 was merged with Primary School No. 20. In 1972, a kindergarten was opened in the scout hall building at 212 Gliwicka Street, and Primary School No. 21 was closed, with students and teachers transferred to School No. 22. The building was transferred to the Janusz Korczak Special Vocational School, and the school number was taken over by the school in Podlesie.

Further reorganization of educational institutions in Załęże took place after 1989. In 1993, Primary School No. 22 reverted to its original patron, Juliusz Słowacki. In 1994, economics classes were established at the Automotive Technical School, and two years later the school was renamed the Complex of Transport and Economics Schools. In 1999, General Education School Complex No. 8 was established in the building of Primary School No. 24 at 276 Gliwicka Street, comprising Junior High School No. 7 and Primary School No. 24. The latter was closed in 2004, and in 2007, Junior High School No. 7 became part of the Stanisław Mastalerz School Complex No. 7, established that same year at 228 Gliwicka Street. Originally, this complex operated from two locations; however, in 2011, Junior High School No. 7 was moved to the premises of Technical School No. 7, and the former building began housing the Upper Silesian Nobel Laureates Omega Community Primary School. In 2019, Junior High School No. 7 was closed as a result of the education reform.

== Religion ==
=== Roman Catholic Church ===
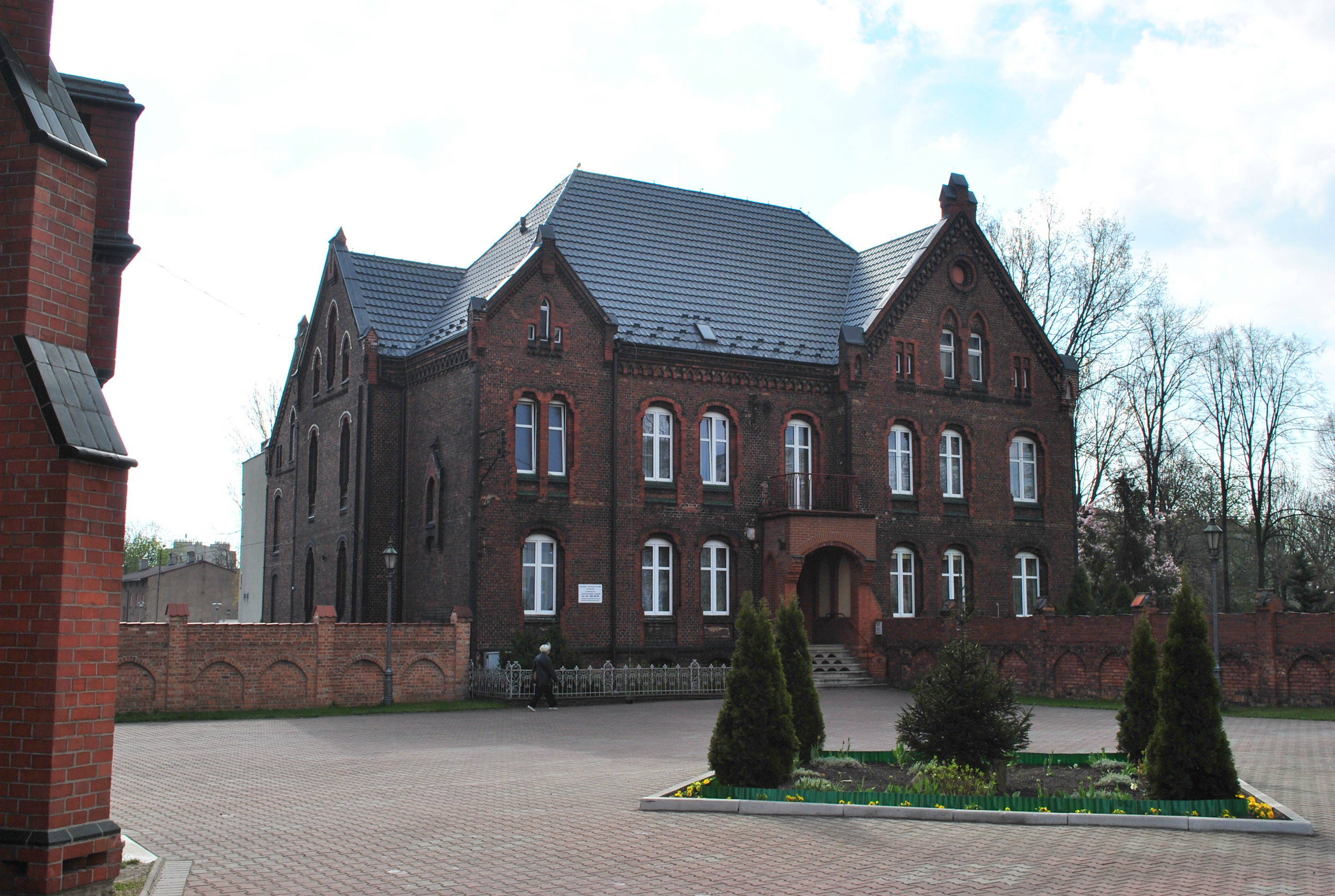
Parish house of the Parish of St. Joseph (2014)

The largest religious community in Załęże is the Roman Catholic Parish of St. Joseph, which covers the entire area of Załęże and had approximately 10,500 parishioners in 2010. It is part of the Katowice-Załęże deanery of the Archdiocese of Katowice. The convent of the Sisters of St. Hedwig also belongs to the parish. Since 2006, Załęże has also been home to a religious house of the Order of Friars Minor Capuchin from the Kraków Province, located at 195 Gliwicka Street.

Historically, in terms of ecclesiastical affiliation, the entire area of Katowice, including Załęże, initially belonged to the Diocese of Kraków, established in 1000. The village, along with the faithful from Bogucice, Brynów, Dąbrówka Mała, Katowice, Ligota, and Zawodzie, belonged to the Parish of St. Stephen in Bogucice, the oldest in Katowice. Until the establishment of the Bogucice parish in the second half of the 14th century, it belonged to the community in Mikołów.

As early as the first half of the 18th century, the residents of Załęże sought to build their own church, and during the pastoral ministry of the Bogucice parish priest, Father Leopold Markiefka, the Protestant owner of Załęże, Ernest Georges de la Tour, proposed the construction of a church, a rectory, a cemetery, and a school in Załęska Hałda. This project dated back to 1855, but the idea was abandoned due to a lack of support from other industrial magnates.

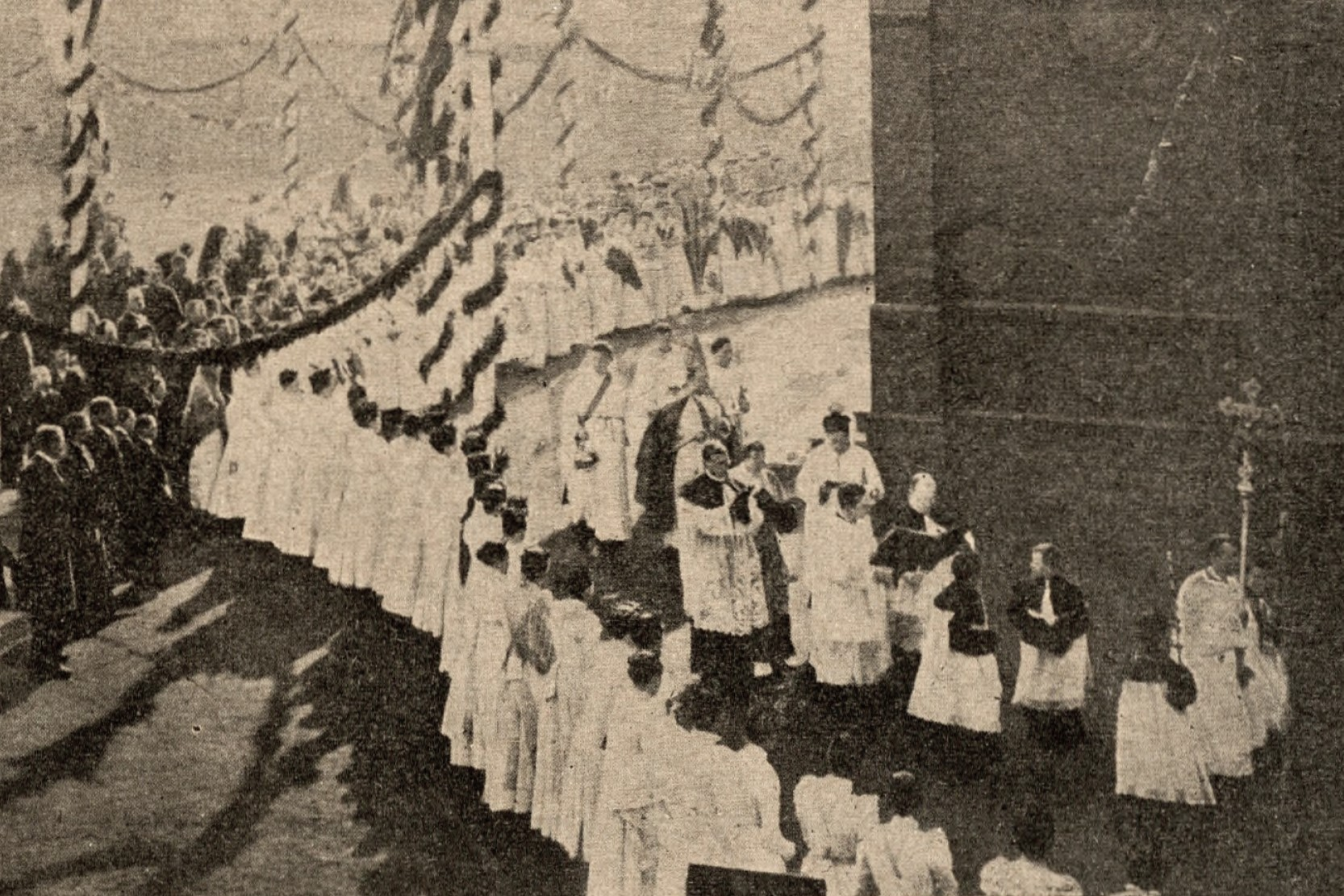
Ceremony of consecration of the Church of St. Joseph on 29 April 1902

In 1860, the first Roman Catholic church was built in Katowice, located near present-day Freedom Square. The new church was attended by 3,100 parishioners, including some residents of Załęże and Załęska Hałda. In the spring of 1861, the Bishop of Wrocław, Father Heinrich Förster, stayed with Father Franz Heide in Racibórz, where he discussed plans for the new Katowice church with Father Teodor Kremski and accountant Heinrich Knapp. The administrator of the Wrocław diocese requested that the minutes include a record of the residents of Załęże renouncing their claims for incorporation into Katowice and remaining with Bogucice until more favorable conditions for a possible secession arose.

The Załęże church was ultimately built in the wake of the mining disaster at the Cleophas Coal Mine, in which 104 miners died. During the funeral of the victims, Father Ludwik Skowronek made a solemn vow to build a church dedicated to St. Joseph, the patron saint of a good death. It was consecrated by the Katowice parish priest, Father Wiktor Schmidt, on 8 November 1900. The residents of Załęże and two hamlets – Obroki and Owsiska – were assigned to the new Roman Catholic parish, established on 20 April 1896. From 1900, Father Józef Kubis served as the parish priest for 42 years.

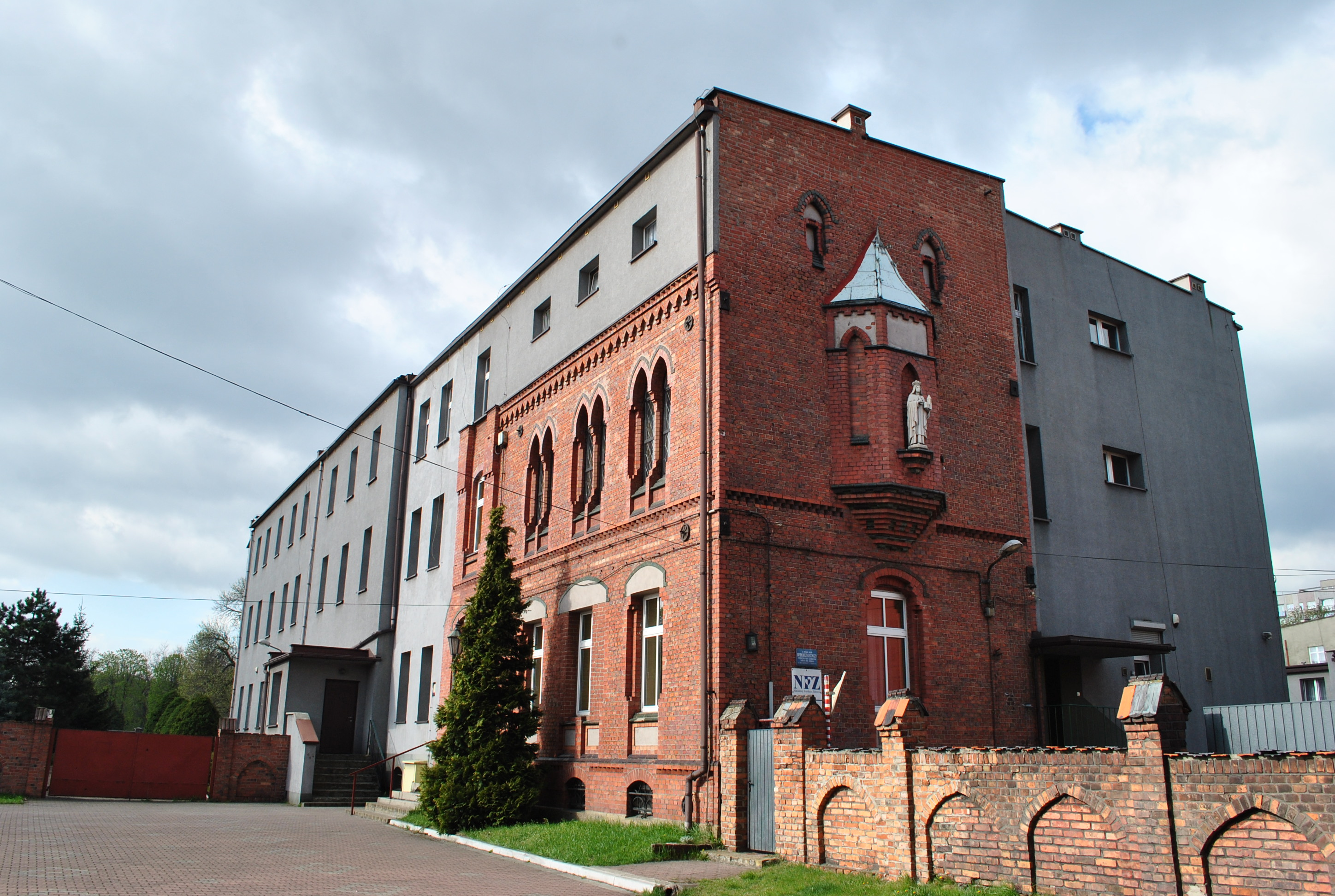
Nursing and care facility at the Parish of St. Joseph (78 Gliwicka Street)

On 4 December 1896, the Załęże curate, Father Ludwik Skowronek, obtained permission from the Bishop of Wrocław, Cardinal Georg von Kopp, to bring nuns to Załęże, and on 30 April 1898, the secular authorities granted permission to build the House of the Sisters of St. Hedwig, which was consecrated on 30 November 1899. The first sisters arrived on 4 April 1899 and took up residence in barracks on the present-day Gminna Street.

Father Władysław Basista was associated with the Załęże parish from 1954 onward. Among other things, he was a lecturer in homiletics and phonetics, served as procurator at the Higher Silesian Seminary from 1956 to 1962, and worked to promote Polish-German cooperation. In 2008, he received the Gold Badge of Honor for his services to the Silesian Voivodeship and was also awarded the title of Honorary Citizen of the City of Katowice.

In August 1987, the Bishop of Katowice, Damian Zimoń, established the Katowice-West deanery, which included, among others, the Załęże parish, and on 1 January 1998, the deanery was renamed Katowice-Załęże.

=== Other denominations ===
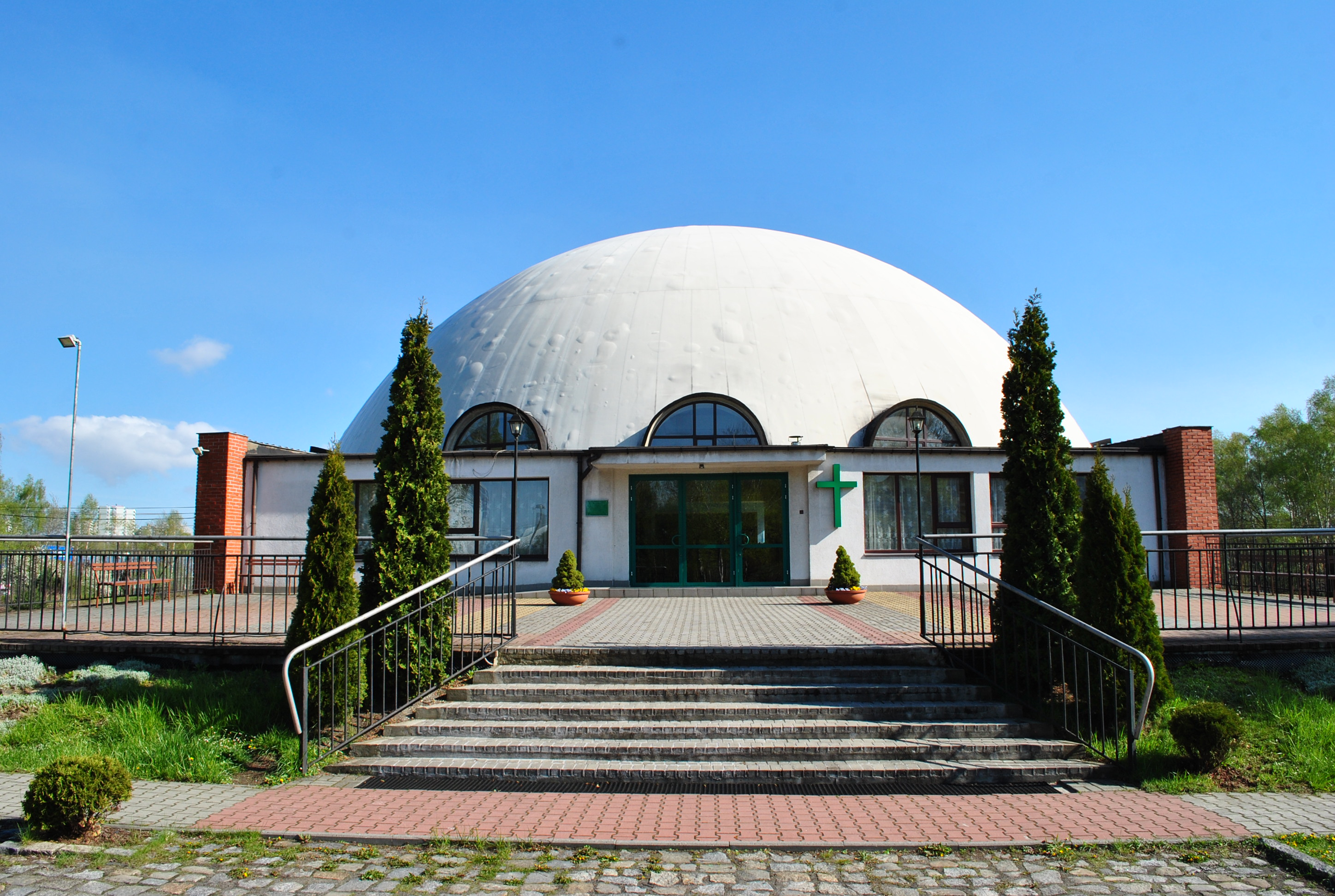
Chapel of the Bethania Pentecostal Church congregation

The number of non-Roman Catholic residents in Załęże grew gradually, and Protestants began to appear there after 1741. In the mid-1820s, there were few non-Catholics, usually just one or two families; however, as industry developed, immigrants began arriving in Załęże, including Catholics, Protestants, and Jews – of whom there were 13 in Załęże in 1825, the highest number among all of today's districts of Katowice.

In 1840, Załęże had a population of 839, including 791 Catholics (94%), 68 Jews, and 20 Protestants. In 1890, Catholics made up almost 97% of the inhabitants, but there were also 155 Protestants, 40 Jews, and 4 Old Catholics living there. After World War I, the population grew, and with it the number of adherents. In 1924, there were over 21,000 Catholics (98% of Załęże's residents) and 303 Protestants.

Before the first non-Catholic places of worship were built in present-day Katowice, Protestants from Załęże attended services in Mikołów and Królewska Huta, while Jews went to Mysłowice. In accordance with the statute adopted in 1857 by the Katowice Evangelical parish, its jurisdiction included, among others, the faithful from Załęże. Jews, on the other hand, joined the newly established Jewish community in Katowice in 1872. In 1861, 53 Jews lived in Załęże, 45 in 1871, and 112 in 1936. Among them were, among others, Loebel Freund, the owner of the Załęże estate, and Dawid Altholz, owner of the Raj Cinema.

In mid-1946, a group of Jehovah's Witnesses was formed in Załęże, with a dozen or so people joining it.

The Bethania Pentecostal Church congregation has been active in Załęże since 1975. Originally, it gathered in an apartment at 89 Gliwicka Street. Due to the growing number of members, a plot of land was donated in 1981 for the construction of a new church. Work on the chapel began in October 1989, and the first service was held in June 1996. Since 1997, services have been held in the main hall. The chapel, located at 267 Gliwicka Street, is built on a circular plan with a diameter of 40 meters. The worship hall can seat 1,300 faithful.

=== Cemeteries ===
On P. Pośpiech Street is the Roman Catholic parish cemetery of the Parish of St. Joseph, established around 1898. It covers an area of 2.1 hectares and was managed by the city from 1943 to 1945. Along the main path are the graves of workers from the Kleofas Coal Mine who died in mining disasters.

The Roman Catholic cemetery on Gliwicka Street was established in 1860 and consecrated on 11 November of the same year. It was taken over in 1871 by Old Catholics, but returned to the Catholics after 1922. On 21 November 2011, the cemetery chapel was entered into the Registry of Cultural Property. Currently, it serves as the parish cemetery of the Parish of Transfiguration.

== Sport and recreation ==
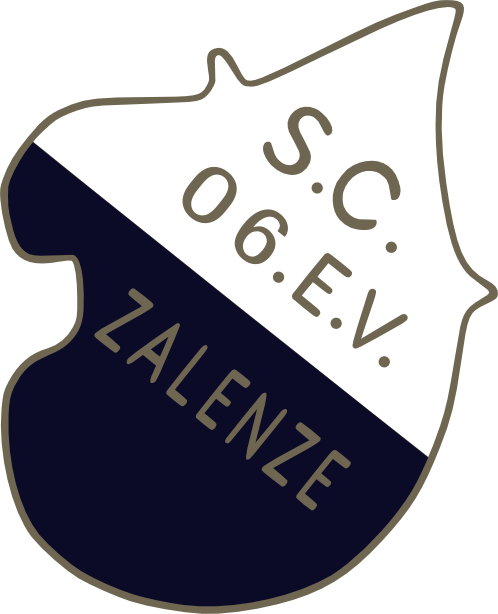
Logo of the 06 Zalenze club used until 1922

Sport in Załęże has a long and rich tradition and is deeply rooted in the local community. The first forms of organized sports and recreational activities emerged in the late 19th century as part of the gymnastics movement. In 1898, the Männer Turn Verein Zalenze was founded, and the Volks- und Jugendspiele operated from 1905 onward. At the beginning of the 20th century, there were two soccer clubs there: 06 Sport Club Zalenze (the predecessor of 06 Kleofas Sports Club) and Naprzód 1912 Załęże.

The 06 Zalenze Club, later 06 Załęże and 06 Katowice, was founded on 23 August 1906 under the patronage of the then-existing Cleophas Coal Mine. It was the first miners' sports club in Poland. Its field was built in 1907 and was part of the miners' sports and recreation complex near the Rawa river. Originally, the club had a single section, but from the mid-1920s onward, other disciplines were developed – in 1925, boxing and weightlifting sections were established, an ice hockey section operated from 1935 to 1939, an athletics section from 1926 to 1931, and a tennis section operated from 1928 to 1933. The 06 Załęże soccer field of was located near the Rawa river.

Naprzód 1912 Załęże was a single-section football club. In 1923, it merged with the Spiel Freudenschaft Załęże club. An athletics section was established in 1937, and by 1939 the club had 363 members. It was dissolved later that same year and struck from the register by voivodeship authorities in 1952. The club used the future KS Baildon Katowice field until 1939.

In the pre-war years, two German sports organizations were also active: the Spiel- und Eislaufverin (an organization founded before 1911, which practiced figure skating, tambourine, the triple jump, and the pentathlon), as well as Turnverein.

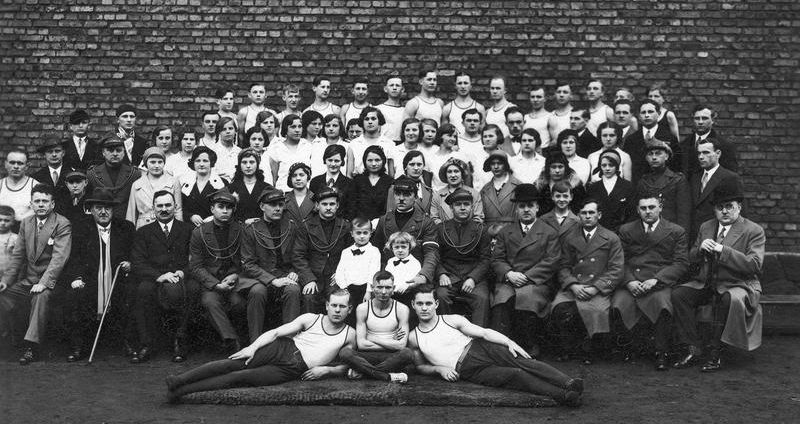
Załęże branch of the Sokół Gymnastics Society – 1932; pictured, among others: Paweł Chrószcz (left) and Wiktor Baranek (centre)

In 1906, on the initiative of Józef Sapa, the Polish-Catholic Society was founded in Załęże. It was broken up by the German police in 1922. Later that same year, on the initiative of Józef Sapa and with the cooperation of several members of the Sokół Gymnastics Society (including, among others, Wiktor Baranek), the Sokół Gymnastics Society was established in Załęże on 11 April. From 1919, the Załęże branch was assigned to the 1st Katowice District of the Silesian Region of the Union of Sokół Gymnastics Societies in Poland. The facilities of the Załęże Sokół included: a gymnasium on M. Wolski Street, a sports field with an athletic track on F. Bocheński Street, and the Bugla swimming pool with a shooting range. The Załęże Sokół gave rise to the Naprzód 1912 Załęże club, the women's branch of the Sokół Gymnastics Society, and the Sokół Gymnastics Society in Załęska Hałda and Dąb. In 1938, Matylda Ossadnik-Ogiermann, a member of the Załęże Sokół, won a bronze medal in artistic gymnastics at the World Championships in the team all-around competition. She also participated in the 1936 Summer Olympics.

14 sports and recreational organizations were active in Załęże between 1922 and 1939.

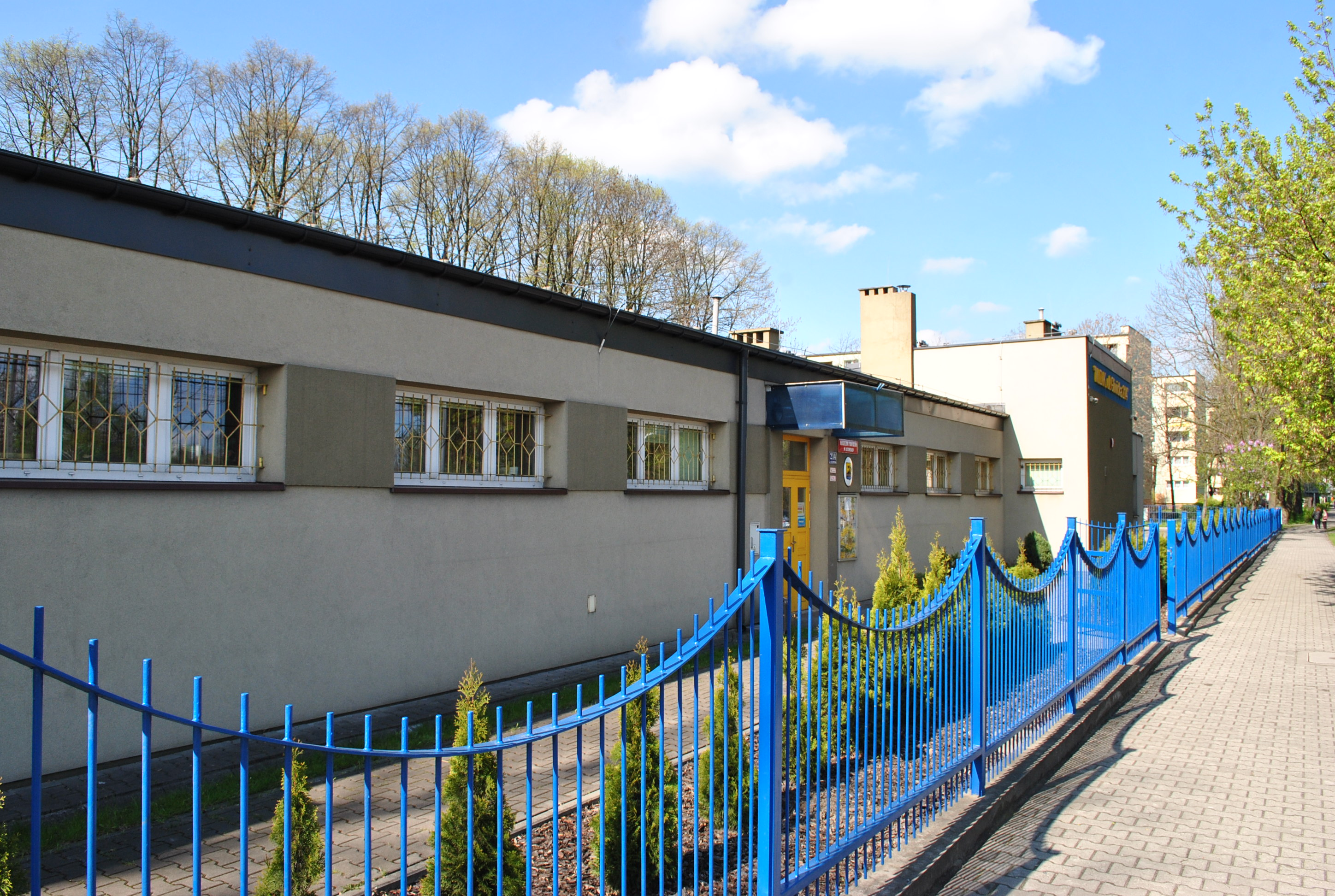
Gliwicka Sports Centre (214 Gliwicka Street) – the former seat of the Youth Cultural Center (2014)

On 24 January 1945, the Baildon Katowice sports club was founded in Dąb, which in 1949 became a citywide club. It had a soccer field located on Gliwicka Street. In 1968, the field hosted a Polish Cup Round of 16 match, in which Baildon Katowice defeated Wisła Kraków 2–1. Today, the Punkt 44 entertainment complex stands on the site of the field. For many years, Baildon Katowice enjoyed significant sporting success. The club was dissolved in 2001.

As early as 1945, the RKS Kopalnia Kleofas sports club was founded, remaining active until 1949. It offered training in football and athletics. Also in 1945, the Zryw Union of Fighting Youth table tennis club was founded. It merged with the Kleofas 06 Katowice club. The MOJ Katowice Sports Club was founded at the MOJ Mining Machinery Factory on 4 July 1946, and on 1 January 1965, it was incorporated into GKS Katowice. In 1962, it had 60 members. Górnik Załęże-Dąb was formed on 20 April 1949 through the merger of the clubs GZKS Kleofas, KS Napęd Załęże, and GZKS Eminencja Dąb. In 1956, it operated under the name Sports Circle Górnik at the Kleofas Coal Mine. The club was active in football, table tennis, and volleyball. In 1957, it was transformed into KS Kleofas 06 Katowice.

The Kleofas 06 Katowice club was registered on 8 May 1958, and its headquarters were originally located in the Miners' House at 204 Gliwicka Street, which housed, among other things, a room with a table tennis table. From 1965 to 1989, it operated within GKS Katowice. The club was reactivated on 21 October 1990. It is the successor to, among others, the 06 Zalenze club. It ran several sections, including boxing. Since 2002, the club has organized the Albert Opała Memorial. Today, the club operates under the name 06 Kleofas AZS AWF Katowice.

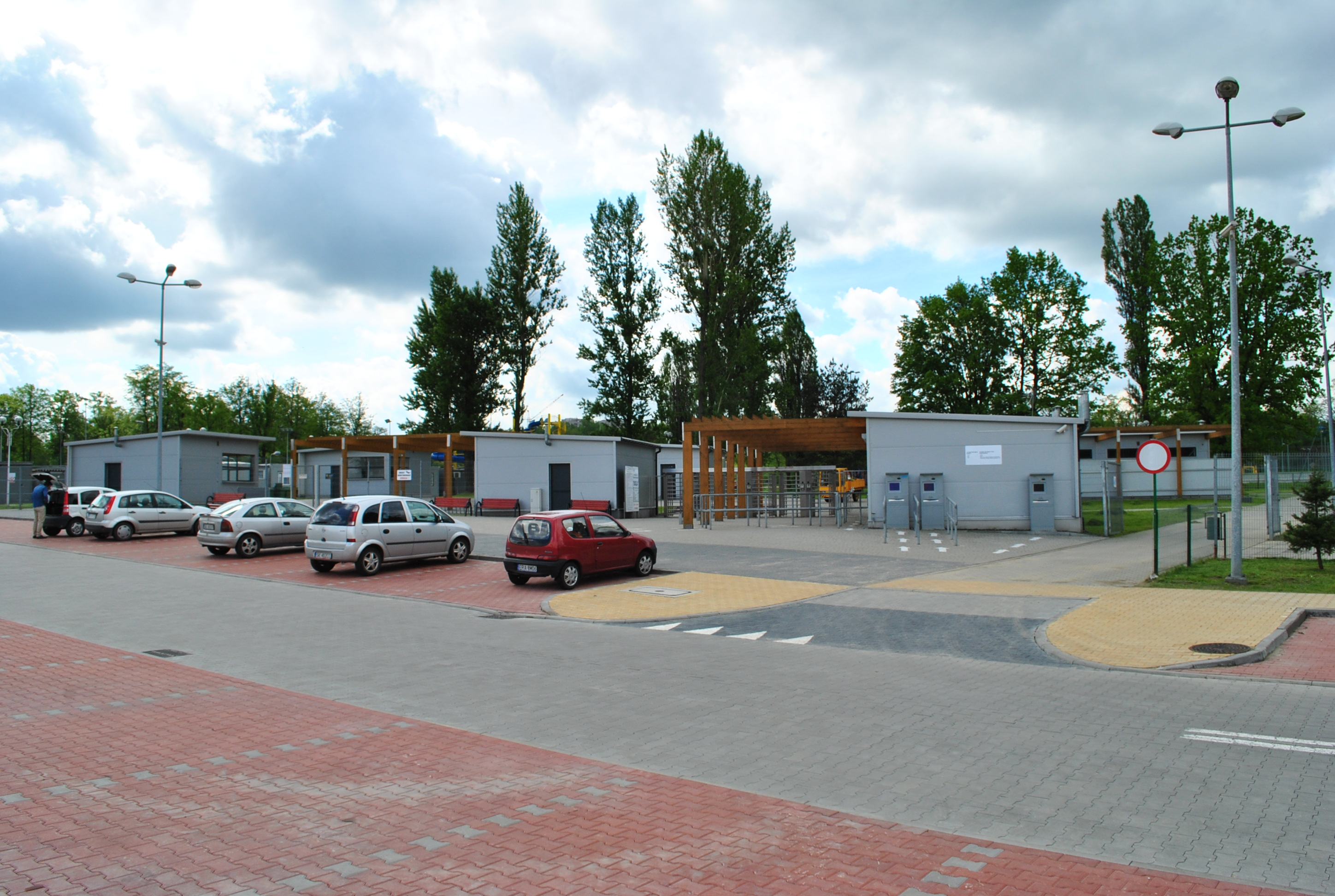
Bugla center on Żeliwna Street

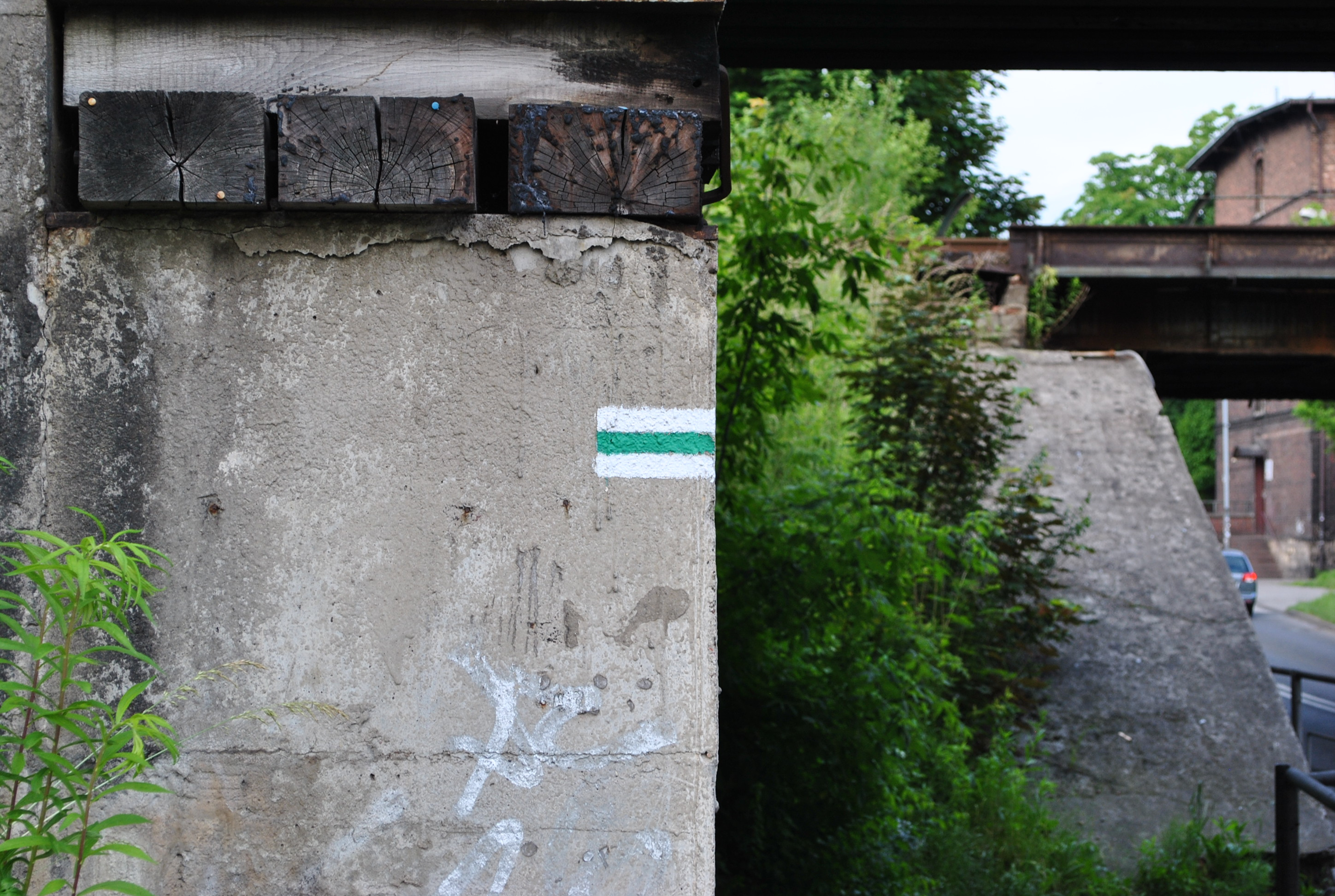
PTTK 25th Anniversary Trail near Wiśniowa Street (2014)

Sports activities in Załęże were also held under the patronage of the Roman Catholic Parish of St. Joseph, which organized the parish sports festival since 1991 on the initiative of Father Norbert Osmańczyk. In addition, the sporting and recreational activity of Załęże was also linked to student sports clubs. The Czarni Załęże Student Sports Club operated at the General Education School Complex No. 8 until 2007. It ran sections for basketball, athletics, volleyball, and combat sports. The Sokół 22 School Sports Club was active at Primary School No. 22 (3 M. Wolski Street) between 2004 and 2018.

Among the more notable athletes associated with Załęże were: wrestler Jan Adamaszek, footballer Ewald Dytko, wrestler Jerzy Gryt, gymnast Matylda Ossadnik-Ogiermann, table tennis player Jerzy Pierończyk, pole vaulter Wilhelm Schneider, skater Franciszek Spitol, sprinter Elżbieta Szyroka, and boxer Marcin Walas, and among sports officials, Paweł Chrószcz and Wiktor Baranek.

There are two sports and recreation facilities in Załęże, managed by the Municipal Sports and Recreation Center in Katowice:

- Bugla Recreation and Leisure Center (26d Żeliwna Street) – one of the most modern facilities of its kind in Poland, renovated in 2010. In addition to two deep pools, it has, among other things, beach soccer and volleyball fields, ping-pong tables, a gym, and an Orlik soccer field;
- Gliwicka Sports Centre (214 Gliwicka Street) – equipped with an Orlik soccer field, an outdoor swimming pool, an aquatic playground, and a multi-purpose hall.

One hiking trail passes through Załęże:

- Polish Tourist and Sightseeing Society 25th Anniversary Trail (115.0 km): Silesian Park – Czeladź – Dąbrowa Górnicza – Jaworzno – Katowice (Panewniki Forests) – Ruda Śląska – Załęże (Wiśniowa Street) – Silesian Park.

== Public and social safety ==
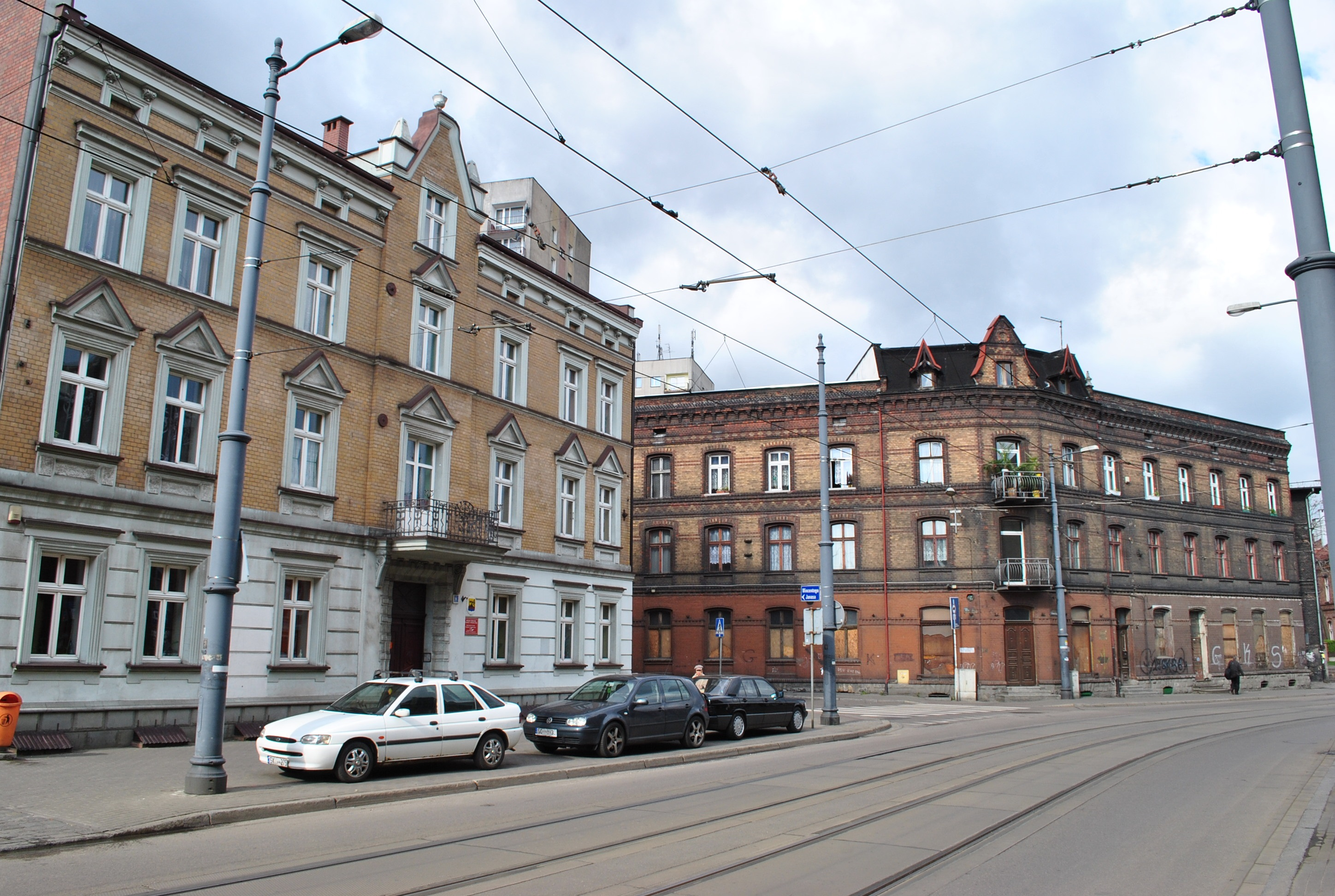
Building of the Local Social Assistance Point No. 4 (96 Gliwicka Street; on the left) in 2014

In terms of crime rates, Załęże is one of Katowice's districts with an average level of safety. The crime rate has decreased over the years: in 2004, it stood at 4.79 (the ratio of the number of crimes to the number of district residents, multiplied by 100) and was 0.26 higher than the rate for Katowice as a whole. In 2007, this rate dropped to 3.00 and was 0.86 lower than the rate for the city. The highest number of criminal incidents was recorded on Gliwicka and F. Bocheński streets. In a 2011 survey, 52.3% of Załęże residents stated that they felt safe in their district, 45.4% disagreed, and 2.3% were undecided on the matter.

In 2017, the Nasze Załęże Community Center was launched in Załęże – a project implemented by the Municipal Social Welfare Center. Its objectives were to increase social cohesion, reduce disparities in residents' living standards, and enhance community integration. As part of the implementation of the second phase of the Nasze Załęże Community Center project, scheduled for 2020–2022, a number of activities were carried out, including the organization of the local community and initiatives supporting the professional reintegration of Załęże residents. A community club for children and youth, a Citizens' Counseling and Information Center, and the District Senior Academy were also opened.

As of November 2024, the following institutions are also operating in Załęże as part of the social welfare system:

- Tabita Christian Charitable Organization (87 Gliwicka Street),
- Christian Charitable Association (89a Gliwicka Street),
- Day Social Assistance Center No. 7 of the Opoka Association for the Elderly, Disabled, and Those Awaiting Support (74a Gliwicka Street),
- Municipal Social Assistance Center,
- Municipal Detoxification Center (10 Macieja Street),
- Katowice County Employment Office (14 P. Pośpiech Street).

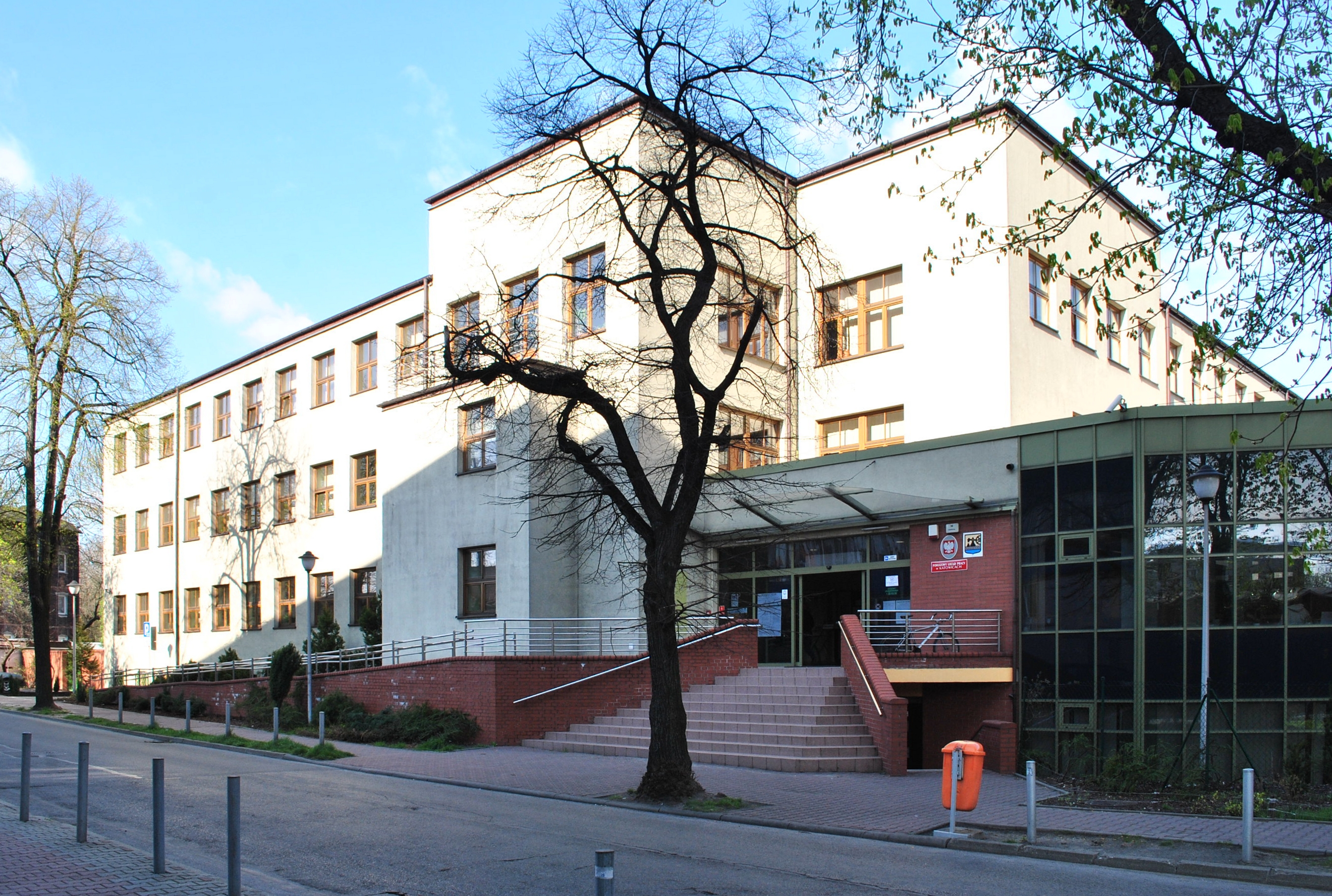
Seat of the Katowice County Labour Office at 14 Pośpiech Street (the former Municipal Asylum building)

One of the first healthcare facilities in Załęże was a pediatric hospital at 14 Pośpiech Street, established in 1943 by the Germans who were occupying Załęże at the time. The hospital was rebuilt after the war on the initiative of Dr. Stanisław Roszak and the Sisters of St. Hedwig. It operated until the end of the 20th century. Today, the building at 10 Macieja Street houses the Municipal Detoxification Center, and the building at 14 P. Pośpiech Street houses the Katowice County Employment Office. The latter building originally housed the Municipal Asylum, which was initially located in a makeshift barrack at 60 Wojewódzka Street. On 1 October 1929, a new Municipal Asylum building was opened at P. Pośpiech Street. It consisted of men's and women's sections, and a soup kitchen for the poor and unemployed. By the late 1960s, there were 10 public hospitals operating in Katowice, including Children's Hospital No. 3 in Załęże.

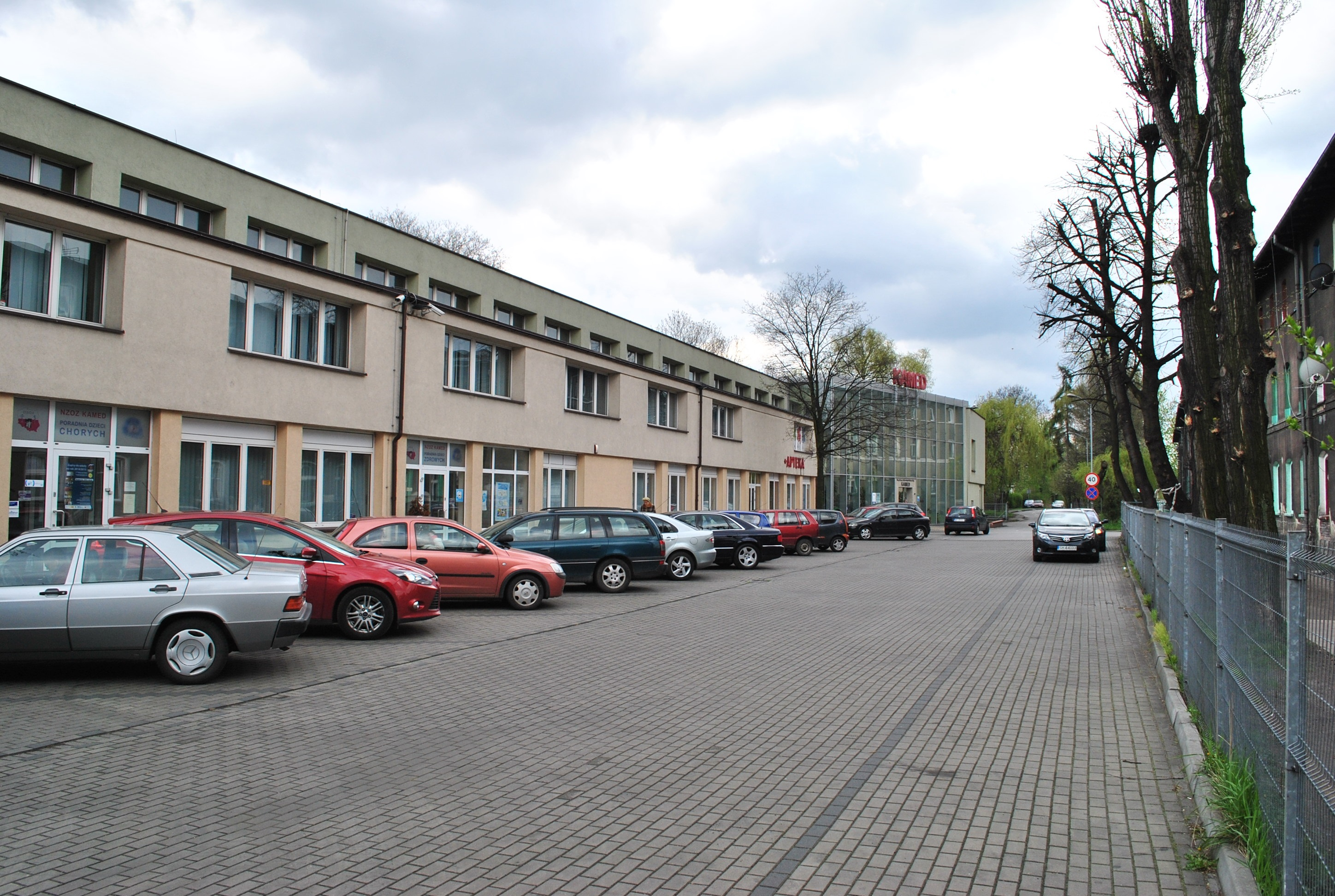
CenterMed clinic at 38a F. Bocheński Street (2014)

In 1919, Stanisław Skiba, born in Załęże – an independence activist, and later the head of the hospital in Bielszowice – began working as a doctor at the local Brotherhood Society.

During their ministry, the Sisters of St. Hedwig ran a daycare center, an orphanage, a home economics school, a kindergarten, and a music school in Załęże, and from 1899 they operated a nursing home for the sick, funded by the gmina. After 1945, all church-run charitable and educational institutions in Załęże were closed down. In 1950, the St. Hedwig facility was transferred to the pro-government Caritas organization, and until 1990, the Sisters of St. Hedwig operated exclusively a home for elderly women. Since 1990, a care and treatment facility has been operating in the district.

As of November 2024, the following healthcare facilities are located in Załęże:

- CenterMed Katowice Clinic (38a F. Bocheński Street),
- Nursing and Care Facility run by the Congregation of the Sisters of St. Hedwig (78 Gliwicka Street).

== Bibliography ==
- Barciak, Antoni; Chojecka, Ewa; Fertacz, Sylwester, eds. (2012). Katowice. Środowisko, dzieje, kultura, język i społeczeństwo [Katowice: Environment, History, Culture, Language and Society] (in Polish). Vol. 1–2. Katowice: Museum of the History of Katowice. ISBN 978-83-87727-24-6.
- Bartoszek, Adam; Czekaj, Krzysztof; Trawkowska, Dobroniega, eds. (2012). Diagnoza problemów społecznych i monitoring polityki społecznej dla aktywizacji zasobów ludzkich w Katowicach [Diagnosis of Social Problems and Monitoring of Social Policy for the Activation of Human Resources in Katowice] (in Polish). Katowice: University of Silesia. ISBN 978-83-61061-97-7.
- Borowy, Robert (1997). Wczoraj – dziś – jutro …kopalni „Katowice-Kleofas": historia węglem pisana [Yesterday – Today – Tomorrow… of the "Katowice-Kleofas" Mine: A History Written in Coal] (in Polish). Katowice: Poligraf. ISBN 83-907139-2-6.
- Bulsa, Michał (2018). Ulice i place Katowic [Streets and Squares of Katowice] (in Polish) (3rd ed.). Katowice: Prasa i Książka. ISBN 978-83-63780-28-9.
- Bulsa, Michał; Grzegorek, Grzegorz; Witaszczyk, Beata (2013). Domy i gmachy Katowic [Houses and Buildings of Katowice] (in Polish). Katowice: Prasa i Książka. ISBN 978-83-63780-00-5.
- Drobek, Daria; Michalska, Ewa; Radecki, Ryszard; Perdyła, Magdalena (January 2014). Opracowanie ekofizjograficzne podstawowe z elementami opracowania ekofizjograficznego problemowego (problematyka ochrony dolin rzecznych oraz ograniczeń dla zagospodarowania terenu wynikających z wpływu działalności górniczej) dla potrzeb opracowania projektów miejscowych planów zagospodarowania przestrzennego obszarów położonych w mieście Katowice [Basic Ecophysiographic Study with Elements of a Problem-Oriented Ecophysiographic Study (Issues of River Valley Protection and Constraints on Land Development Resulting from the Impact of Mining Activity) for the Purposes of Preparing Draft Local Spatial Development Plans for Areas Located within the City of Katowice] (in Polish). Katowice: Werona.
- Drobniak, Adam; Polko, Adam; Plac, Klaudia, eds. (2014). Diagnoza sytuacji społeczno-ekonomicznej Miasta Katowice wraz z wyznaczeniem obszarów rewitalizacji i analizą strategiczną [Diagnosis of the Socio-Economic Situation of the City of Katowice with Delineation of Revitalisation Areas and Strategic Analysis] (PDF) (in Polish). Katowice: City of Katowice. ISBN 978-83-61061-97-7.
- Dzióbek, Michał (2023). Katowickie pomniki i tablice pamiątkowe: katalog [Katowice Monuments and Memorial Plaques: A Catalogue] (in Polish). Katowice: Silesian Center for Freedom and Solidarity. ISBN 978-83-966732-3-7.
- Frużyński, Adam; Grzegorek, Grzegorz; Rygus, Piotr (2017). Kopalnie i huty Katowic [Mines and Steelworks of Katowice] (in Polish). Katowice: Prasa i Książka. ISBN 978-83-63780-23-4.
- Halor, Jakub (2010). "Linia 7 Katowice – Świętochłowice – Bytom cz. 1 - historia linii" [Railway 7 Katowice – Świętochłowice – Bytom, Part 1: History of the Line]. Świat Kolei (in Polish). 7. Łódź: EMI-Press. ISSN 1234-5962.
- Kasprzyk, Maria (1994). Studium historyczno-urbanistyczne Katowic w granicach administracyjnych. Załęże. Tom I: Tekst [Historical-Urbanistic Study of Katowice Within the Administrative Boundaries. Załęże. Volume I: Text] (in Polish). Kraków: ARKONA.
- Kurek, Jacek; Piontek, Anna (2013). "W narożniku… Wśród mieszkańców międzywojennej Kolonii Mościckiego w Katowicach" [In the Corner… Among the Residents of the Interwar Kolonia Mościckiego in Katowice]. Anthropos? (in Polish). 20–21. ISSN 1730-9549.
- Musioł, Ludwik (1969). Załęże: monografia historyczna dzisiejszej dzielnicy miasta Katowic [Załęże: A Historical Monograph of Today's District of Katowice] (in Polish).
- Pierończyk, Ginter (2017). Meandry załęskiego sportu [Meanders of Załęże Sport] (in Polish) (1st ed.). Kotórz Mały: Silesia Progress. ISBN 978-83-65558-14-5.
- Pierończyk, Ginter (2019). Plecionka [The Braid] (in Polish). Kotórz Mały: Silesia Progress. ISBN 978-83-65558-24-4.
- Pierończyk, Ginter; Różycka, Aleksandra; Gąsior, Jan (2016). Historia Załęża cegłą pisana [The History of Załęże Written in Brick] (in Polish).
- Prandzioch-Goretzki, Bernadeta (2021). 125-lecie parafii św. Józefa w Katowicach-Załężu 1896–2021 [125th Anniversary of the Parish of St. Joseph in Katowice-Załęże, 1896–2021] (in Polish). Katowice: Roman Catholic Parish of St. Joseph in Katowice-Załęże.
- Prognoza oddziaływania na środowisko miejscowego planu zagospodarowania przestrzennego dla obszaru w rejonie ulic Gliwickiej, Brackiej i Grundmanna w Katowicach [Environmental Impact Forecast for the Zoning for the Area Near Gliwicka, Bracka, and Grundmann Streets in Katowice] (in Polish). Katowice: City Development Office "Katowice". 2013.
- Raport o stanie miasta Katowice [Report on the State of the City of Katowice] (PDF) (in Polish). Katowice: Urząd Miasta Katowice. 2005.
- Rzewiczok, Urszula (2009). Huta Baildon i jej twórca [Baildon Steelworks and Its Founder] (in Polish). Katowice: Museum of History of Katowice. ISBN 978-83-87727-99-4.
- Steuer, Antoni (2010). "Z dziejów Załęża" [From the History of Załęże] (PDF). Nasze Katowice (in Polish). 12 (26). ISSN 1899-9530.
- Steuer, Antoni (2022). "Leksykon struktur katowickiego sportu i turystyki" [Lexicon of Structures of Katowice Sport and Tourism]. mhk.katowice.pl (in Polish). Archived from the original on 19 April 2022.
- Steuer, Antoni (2022). "Leksykon załęski" [Załęże Lexicon]. mhk.katowice.pl (in Polish). Archived from the original on 5 July 2022.
- Szaflarski, Józef (1978). Katowice 1865–1945: zarys rozwoju miasta [Katowice 1865–1945: An Outline of the City's Development] (in Polish). Katowice: Śląsk.
- Szaraniec, Lech (1996). Osady i osiedla Katowic [Settlements and Estates of Katowice] (in Polish). Katowice: Artur. ISBN 83-905115-0-9.
- Zemła, Marek, ed. (25 April 2012). Studium uwarunkowań i kierunków zagospodarowania przestrzennego miasta Katowice – II edycja. Część 1. Uwarunkowania zagospodarowania przestrzennego [Study of the Conditions and Directions of Spatial Development of the City of Katowice – Second Edition. Part One. Conditions of Spatial Development] (PDF) (in Polish). Katowice: Biuro Rozwoju Regionu.
