= Osiedle Paderewskiego – Muchowiec =

District of Katowice

Osiedle Paderewskiego-Muchowiec
- Katowice District
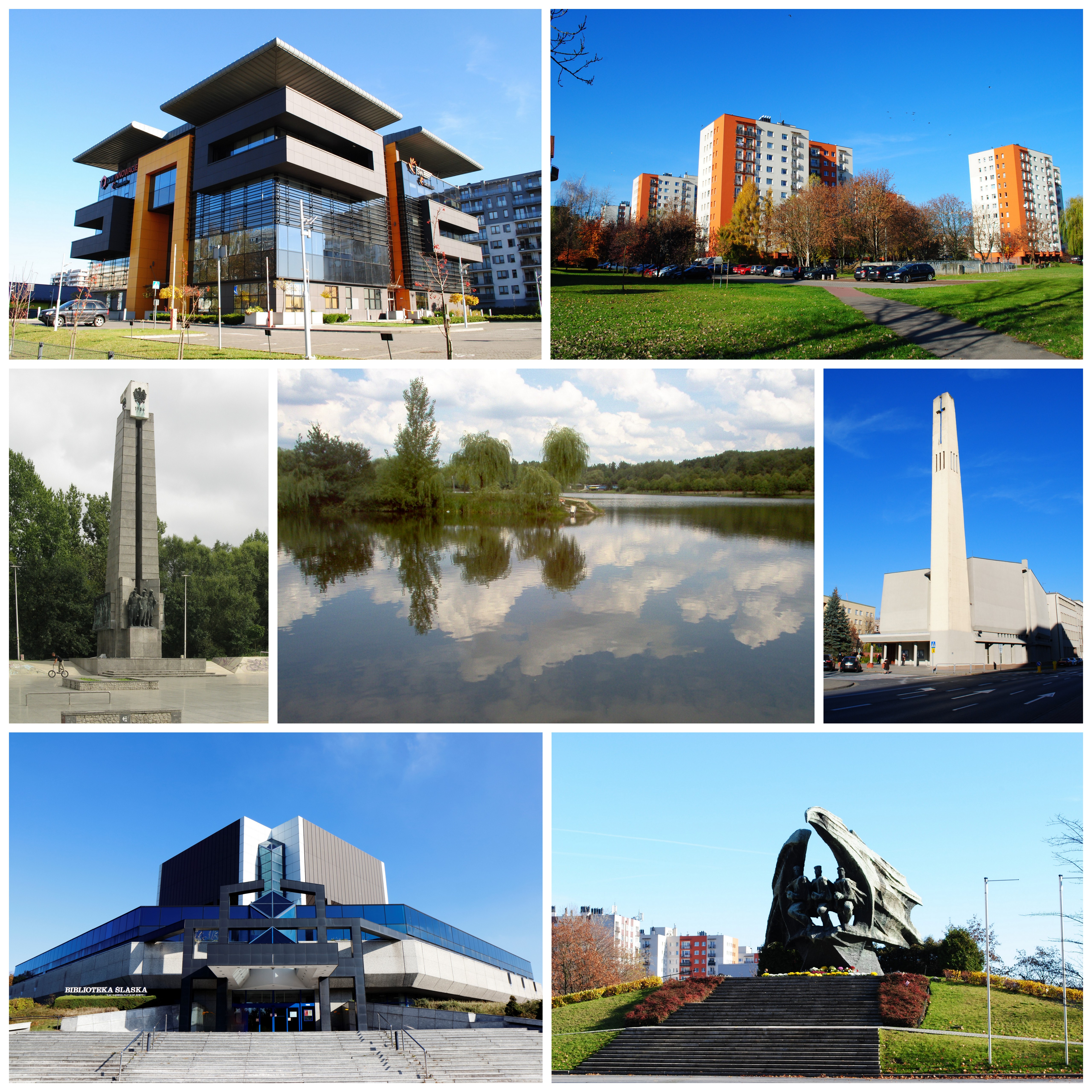
- JSW Innowacje office building, fragment of Osiedle Paderewskiego, Monument of Mining Effort on Graniczna Street, fragment of the Valley of Three Ponds, Church of the Assumption of Mary, the Silesian Library building on Council of Europe Square, Polish Soldier Monument

- Coat of arms

- Location of Osiedle Paderewskiego-Muchowiec within Katowice
- Coordinates: 50°14′39.959″N 19°02′03.814″E
- Country: Poland
- Voivodeship: Silesian
- County/City: Katowice
- Established: 1 January 1992

Area
  - Total: 7.42 km^{2} (2.86 sq mi)
- Elevation: 260–300 m (850–980 ft)

Population (2014)
  - Total: 11,347
  - Density: 1,530/km^{2} (3,960/sq mi)
- Time zone: UTC+1 (CET)
  - Summer (DST): UTC+2 (CEST)
- Area code: (+48) 032

Osiedle Paderewskiego–Muchowiec (German: Muchowietz) is a district of Katowice, located in the central part of the city, between Śródmieście, Zawodzie, Janów-Nikiszowiec, Giszowiec, Piotrowice-Ochojec, and the eastern part of Brynów-Osiedle Zgrzebnioka. The Leśny Stream flows through the district. It covers an area of 7.42 km^{2} and, according to data from the end of 2020, had a population of 11,336.

It is a very diverse district in terms of architecture, urban planning, and its functions. The northern part includes buildings from the turn of the 19th and 20th centuries as well as newer ones. This part contains student dormitories and the only place of worship in the district: the Roman Catholic Church of the Assumption of Mary. The central part is occupied by Osiedle Paderewskiego, constructed in the 1970s on the site of the former Karbowa district, among others, and to the west of it, at Council of Europe Square, there is the headquarters of the Silesian Library. The A4 motorway runs parallel through the center of the district, along which a number of office buildings and commercial and service facilities have been built, including the 3 Stawy shopping center. The southern part of the district, which includes Muchowiec has great natural and recreational value. It contains the largest area of managed greenery in Katowice: the Katowice Forest Park, which includes the Valley of Three Ponds. The Katowice-Muchowiec Airfield is also located there.

== Geography ==
=== Location ===
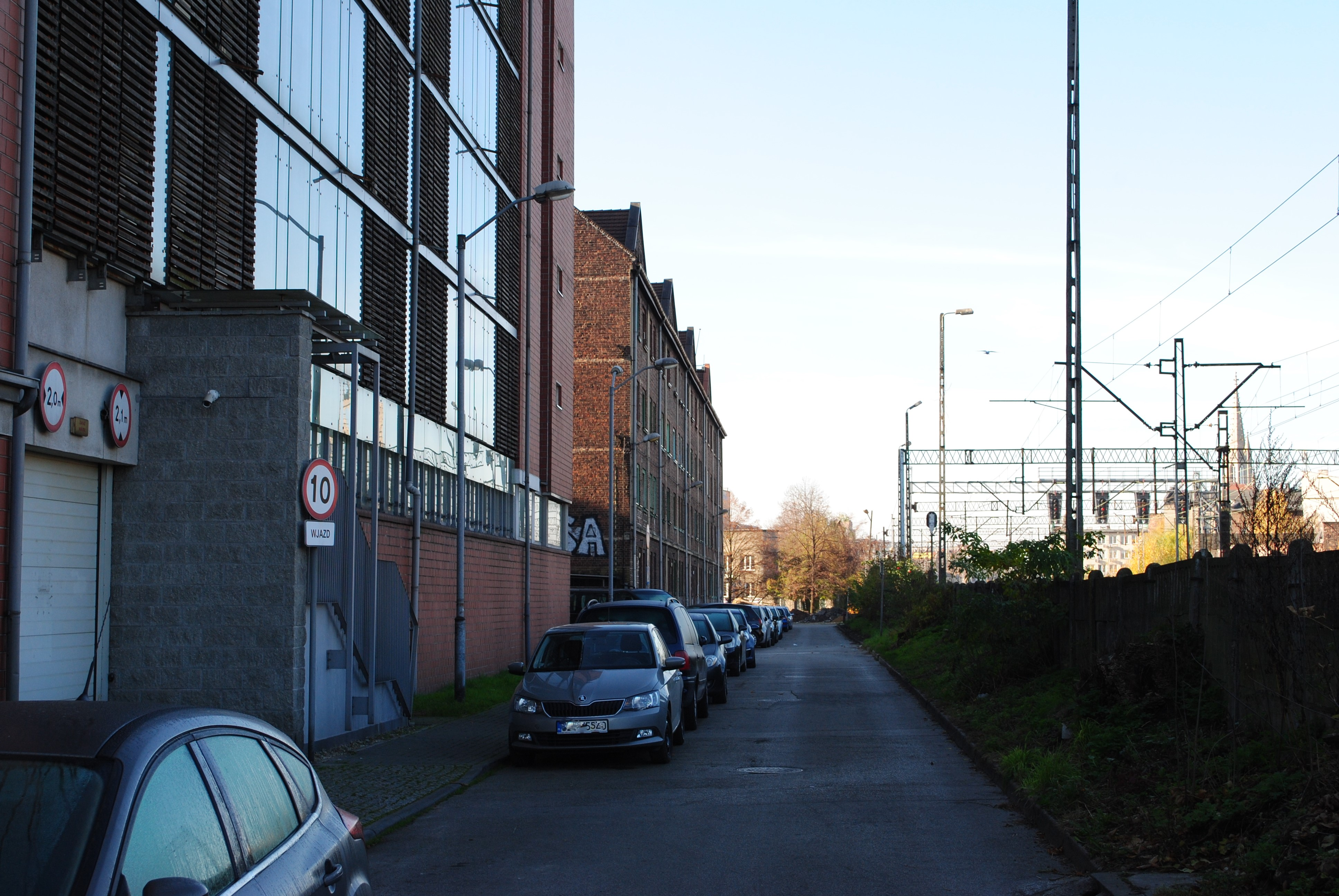
Równoległa Street (view to the west), running parallel to the boundary of the district with Zawodzie

Osiedle Paderewskiego-Muchowiec is one of Katowice's 22 districts and functions as an auxiliary unit of municipality no. 4, within the group of downtown districts. It is located in the central part of the city and borders Zawodzie and Janów-Nikiszowiec to the north and east, Giszowiec and Piotrowice-Ochojec to the south, and the eastern part of Brynów-Osiedle Zgrzebnioka and Śródmieście to the west. The boundaries of the district are:

- to the north – along the railway tracks (including Warszawa Zachodnia-Katowice line) and Równoległa Street parallel to Murckowska Street,
- to the east – parallel along the eastern part of Murckowska Street and the A4 motorway towards Kraków to the intersection of this road with the railway tracks,
- to the south – along the railway tracks, and after crossing Pszczyńska Street, along 73 Pułku Piechoty Street,
- to the west – the boundary surrounds the western part of the former Katowice Muchowiec classification yard; then, at Zgrzebnioka Street, it runs north-west; at the K. Michalski Roundabout at the intersection of Zgrzebnioka, Gawronów and Meteorologów streets, the border turns east, surrounding the buildings in the area of Muchowiec Street from the south, east and north; it then proceeds parallel halfway between Francuska and Krzemienna streets; further on, the border runs along Francuska Street with bends in the area of buildings 101, 105 and 107 (which remain within the district boundaries); at the junction with the A4 motorway, the border heads towards Polna and K. Damrot streets; it then surrounds R. Holtze Square (within the district boundaries) and the former site of Belg Shopping center (demolished at the end of 2023 and located in Śródmieście); afterwards it runs parallel to Graniczna Street, and at Przemysłowa Street, it turns slightly west, parallel to Graniczna Street, in a northerly direction, ending at Równoległa Street, at the tripoint of the boundaries of Śródmieście, Zawodzie, and Osiedle Paderewskiego-Muchowiec.

According to Jerzy Kondracki's physical-geographical division, the district is located in the Katowice Upland mesoregion, which forms the southern part of the Silesian Upland macroregion. The Silesian Upland itself is a part of the Silesian-Kraków Upland subprovince. In terms of historical regions, Osiedle Paderewskiego-Muchowiec is located in the eastern part of Upper Silesia.

According to the state register of geographical names, the district includes the main parts of the city: Osiedle Paderewskiego, Muchowiec, Valley of Three Ponds and Kolonia Zuzanny.

=== Geology ===
The area of Osiedle Paderewskiego-Muchowiec is located in the Upper Silesian Sinkhole, a region with a horst structure. At the turn of the Devonian and Carboniferous periods, the Palaeozoic bedrock of the Silesian Upland was disrupted by the formation of a sinkhole, which during the Carboniferous period was filled with conglomerates, sandstones, and shales that contain bituminous coal. Formations from this period form the bedrock of the district, and a fault runs meridionally at the height of the Valley of Three Ponds. Upper formations from the Carboniferous period cover the western part of the district – the area west of Graniczna Street and north of Lotnisko Street. Outcrops of the Orzesze layers (Westphalian B) are present there. They consist of thick series composed mainly of shales, with sandstones, siderites, and bituminous coal. The thickness of this series exceeds 900 metres. A characteristic feature of these layers are also shales with a thickness of up to several dozen meters, which are suitable for the production of building ceramics.

The main features of Osiedle Paderewskiego-Muchowiec landscape were formed during the Tertiary period, a time of intense chemical weathering and denudation. During the Quaternary, the area was likely covered by the Scandinavian ice sheet on two occasions: during the oldest Mindel glaciation and during the Riss glaciation. The sediments from the first glaciation were mostly removed during the interglacial, while the Riss ice sheet left behind glacial tills along valley depressions. In Osiedle Paderewskiego-Muchowiec, the glacial tills stretch along the valley of the Leśny Stream, while the north-eastern part of the district, in the area of I. J. Paderewski and Z. Krasiński streets, consists of Pleistocene glacial and glaciofluvial sands and gravels. In the current Holocene, Pleistocene sediments are being destroyed and cleared away, and a low terrace formed in several stages has developed in the river valleys. The valley of the Leśny Stream, in its immediate vicinity, is formed by Holocene river sediments.

=== Topography ===
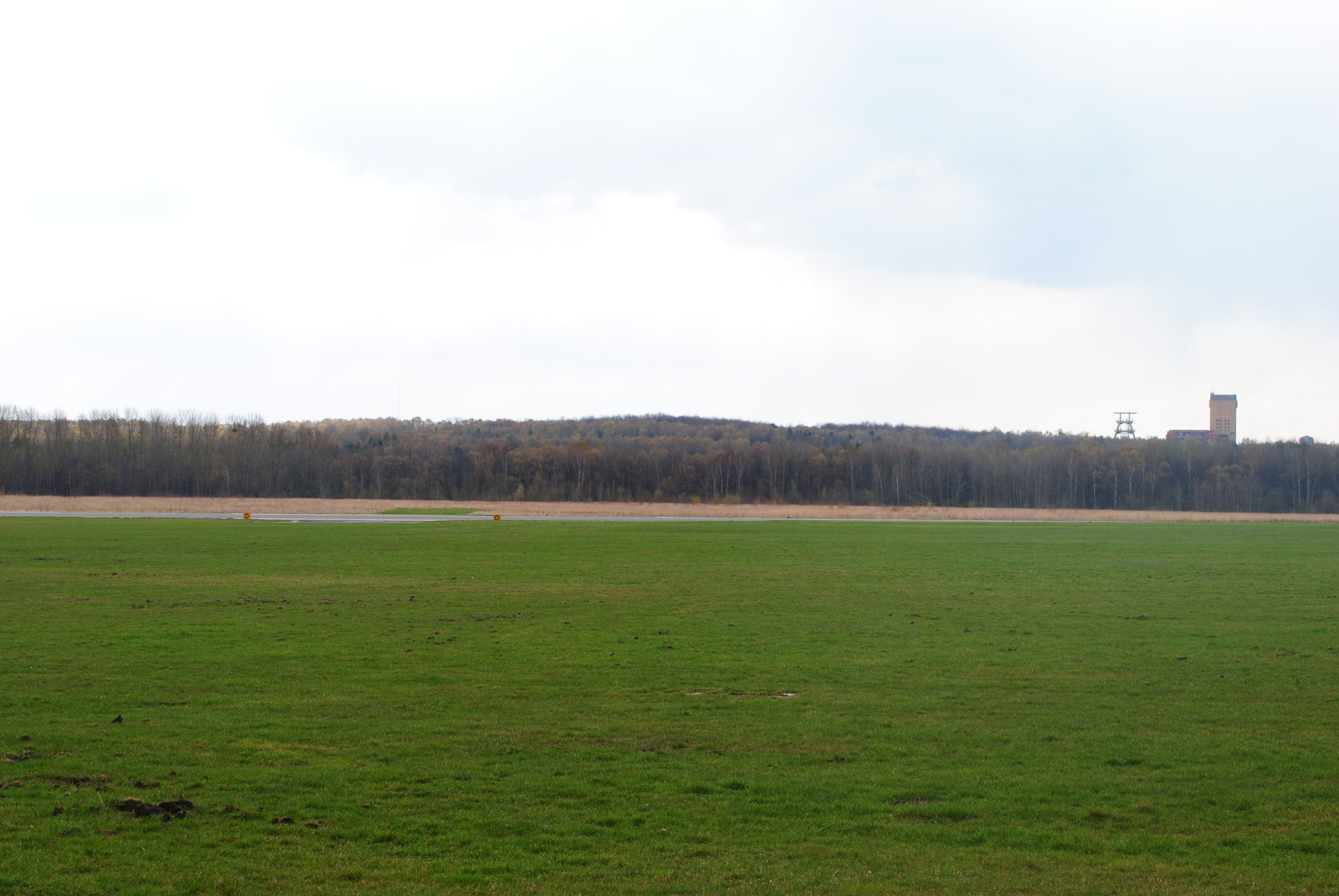
View of the highest elevation in the area of Osiedle Paderewskiego-Muchowiec, located in the road corridor of 73 Pułku Piechoty Street, on the border with Giszowiec; view from the Katowice-Muchowiec Airfield, with a fragment of the Staszic-Wujek Coal Mine visible on the right

Osiedle Paderewskiego-Muchowiec is located in the Silesian Upland, on the Bytom–Katowice Plateau, which is part of the Katowice Upland mesoregion. The northern part consists of river valley bottoms with Pleistocene terraces, the area along the Leśny Stream valley has flat, clayey uplands, while the remaining area, covering the regions east of Graniczna Street and the south-eastern fragment in the area of the border with Giszowiec, consists of hilly uplands. The present-day topography of Osiedle Paderewskiego-Muchowiec was mainly shaped by the Mindel glaciation and the maximum stage of the Riss glaciation. In recent times, the morphogenetic human activity related to settlement and mining has also had a significant impact. This has led to the destruction of the natural substrate and the creation of new forms of landscape degradation. The area of the district stretching north of Lotnisko Street is also an anthropogenic levelled surface.

In terms of morphological units, Osiedle Paderewskiego-Muchowiec is located in three areas. The northern part of the district is located in the Rawa Depression – a valley deeply cut into Carboniferous formations. The higher part of the terrace is an erosion and denudation surface formed after the Riss glaciation. The western part of the district is located in the Kochłowice Hills, which merge to the east into the Murcki Plateau, covering the eastern and southern parts of the district. Towards the city center, this plateau forms several distinct ridges, two of which separate the Valley of Three Ponds. The district's highest and lowest points are both located on the Murcki Plateau. The highest point is a hill whose summit lies on the border between Osiedle Paderewskiego-Muchowiec and Giszowiec, in the eastern part of 73 Pułku Piechoty Street, reaching a height of 300 m above sea level. The lowest point is in the Valley of Three Ponds, near the ponds by Żołnierza Polskiego Square, where the elevation falls below 260 m above sea level. The difference in height between the extreme points of the district is about 40 metres.

=== Soils ===
The soils in Osiedle Paderewskiego-Muchowiec were generally formed on a substrate of weak clayey sand, while organic substrate is often found in river valleys. Human activity has caused changes in soil properties, and long-term urban development has led to the creation of anthrosols in the district. Some of the land is affected by mining and is also contaminated with heavy metals. The agricultural suitability of the soils classified in the district is poor – these soils are classified as class IV. These areas are located in the vicinity of Pilotów and Karbowa streets.

The area stretching along the valley of the Leśny Stream is covered with luvisols formed from glacial tills and loamy and silty sands. Their properties are similar to those of cambi-soils, and their pH is mostly acidic or close to neutral. The western part of the district is dominated by anthropogenic soils formed from sandstones. In these soils, human activity is the main soil-forming factor.

=== Hydrology ===
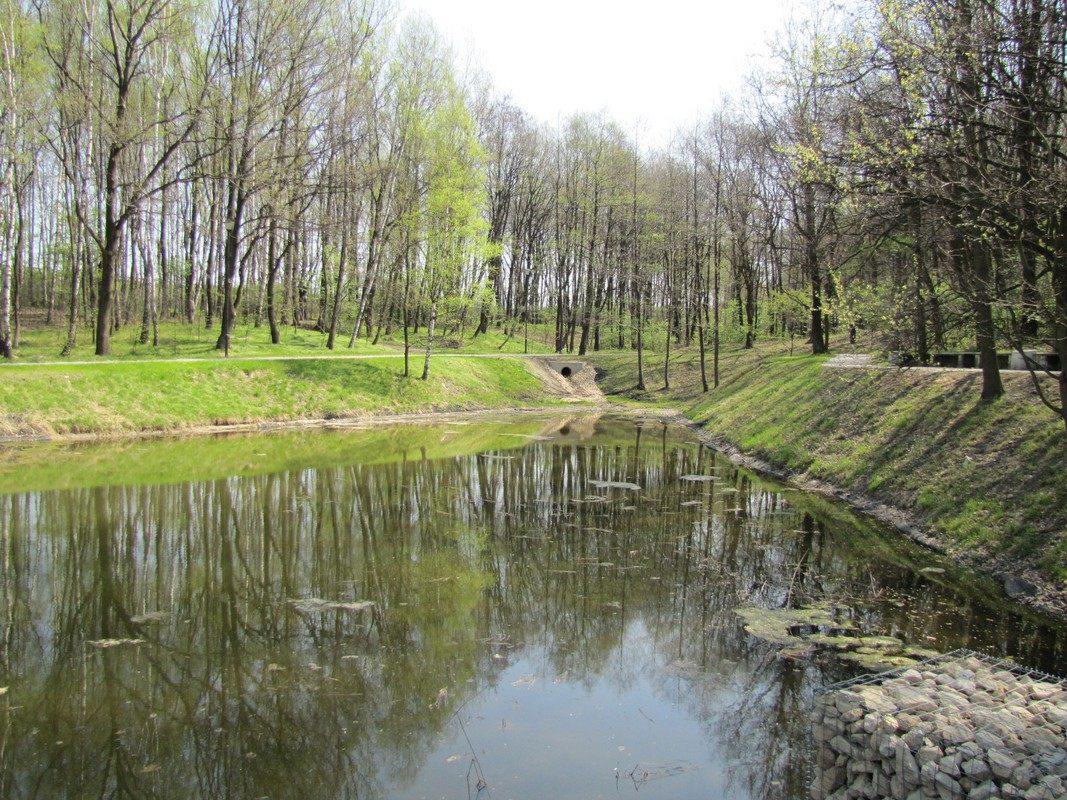
One of the water bodies in the Valley of Three Ponds

Osiedle Paderewskiego-Muchowiec is located in the Vistula basin, in the drainage basin of three rivers and streams: Bolina, Leśny Stream, and Rawa. The Bolina drainage basin covers a small, south-eastern part of the district in the area where the district borders Giszowiec and Janów-Nikiszowiec. The northern part of Osiedle Paderewskiego-Muchowiec, in the vicinity of the Church of the Assumption of Mary, is located in the Rawa drainage basin. The remaining, larger part of the district is drained by Leśny Stream. A fifth-order drainage divide separates the drainage basins of the Rawa and Bolina on one side and the Leśny Stream on the other.

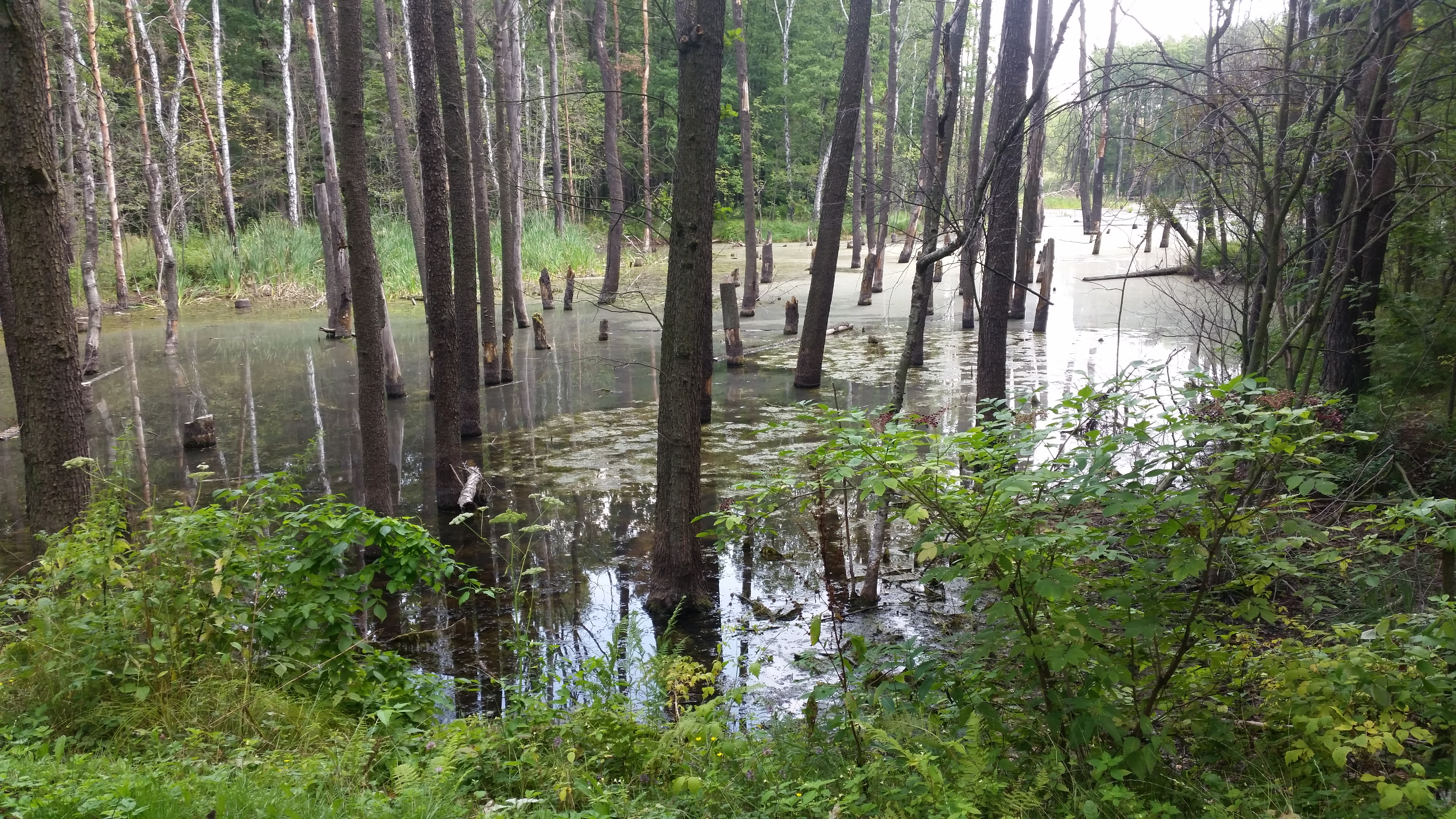
Water-filled subsidence basin formed as a result of mining activity in the area of Osiedle Paderewskiego-Muchowiec

The Leśny Stream flows almost entirely through Osiedle Paderewskiego-Muchowiec, and at the railway line it enters the Zawodzie district, where it flows into the Rawa river. Its source is located in Giszowiec, behind the former Katowice Muchowiec classification yard. Initially, it flows in a north-easterly direction, then at the level of the former Kolonia Zuzanny, it changes its course to the north. The stream is subject to constant regulation. In 2012, the condition of the waters of the Leśny Stream at its confluence with the Rawa river was assessed as poor, its physicochemical condition was below good, its ecological potential and biological condition were assessed as moderate, while the condition of the stream in terms of the presence of particularly harmful substances was good at that time.

All water reservoirs in Osiedle Paderewskiego-Muchowiec ae located in the Leśny Stream drainage basin, in the Valley of Three Ponds. These reservoirs are anthropogenic in origin and serve both natural and recreational purposes. The reservoirs in the Valley of Three Ponds were created in the 19th century as a result of depressions in the longitudinal profile of the Leśny Stream associated with mining subsidence. The Valley of Three Ponds reservoir complex consists of a total of 11 water bodies, with a total area of over 35 hectares.

According to Bronisław Paczyński's classification, Osiedle Paderewskiego-Muchowiec is located within the Silesian-Kraków hydrogeological region, in the Upper Silesian subregion. Aquifers occur in all layers, but their significance depends on several factors. According to the division of Poland into Uniform Groundwater Areas, the entire district is located in Uniform Groundwater Area No. 111 (Central Vistula Upland Subregion).

=== Climate and topoclimate ===
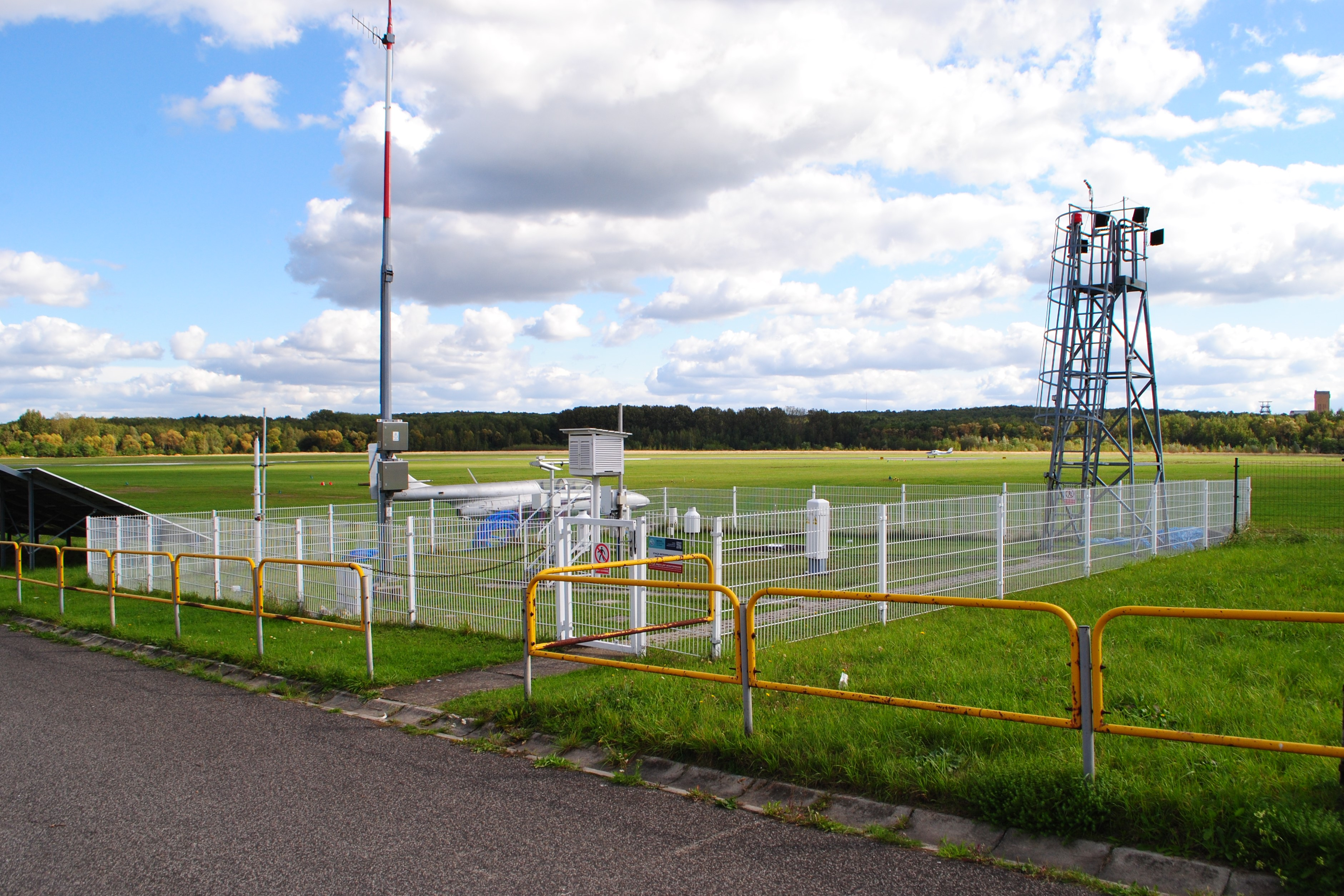
Weather station on the premises of the Katowice-Muchowiec Airfield

The climatic conditions of Osiedle Paderewskiego-Muchowiec are modified by both climatogenic and local factors that shape the topoclimate. According to the agricultural and climatic regionalization developed by R. Gumiński, the area belongs to the Częstochowa–Kielce district, which is characterized by precipitation levels ranging from 500 to nearly 800 mm, and the growing season lasts an average of 210–220 days. The climate is also significantly influenced by the proximity of the Moravian Gate and the Beskids, which makes it slightly warmer and more humid than the average for the entire climatic district.

According to data from the weather station located in the Muchowiec district for the years 1961–1990, the average annual atmospheric temperature at that time was 7.9 °C, with an average temperature of 17.8 °C in July and −2.3 °C. The highest air temperature was recorded on 29 August 1992, and was 36.0 °C, while the lowest was recorded on 8 January 1987, and was −27.4 °C. The average annual precipitation in the period 1961–1990 was 723.1 mm. The maximum daily precipitation recorded in Muchowiec was 82 mm on 21 April 1972. Between 1962 and 2004, the highest precipitation was recorded in July (103.2 mm), and the lowest in February (37.6 mm). The average annual number of days with precipitation above 0.1 mm was 183 days. The average number of foggy days per year between 1961 and 1990 was 55 days, the average annual snow cover duration was 60 days, and growing season lasted on average 210–220 days.

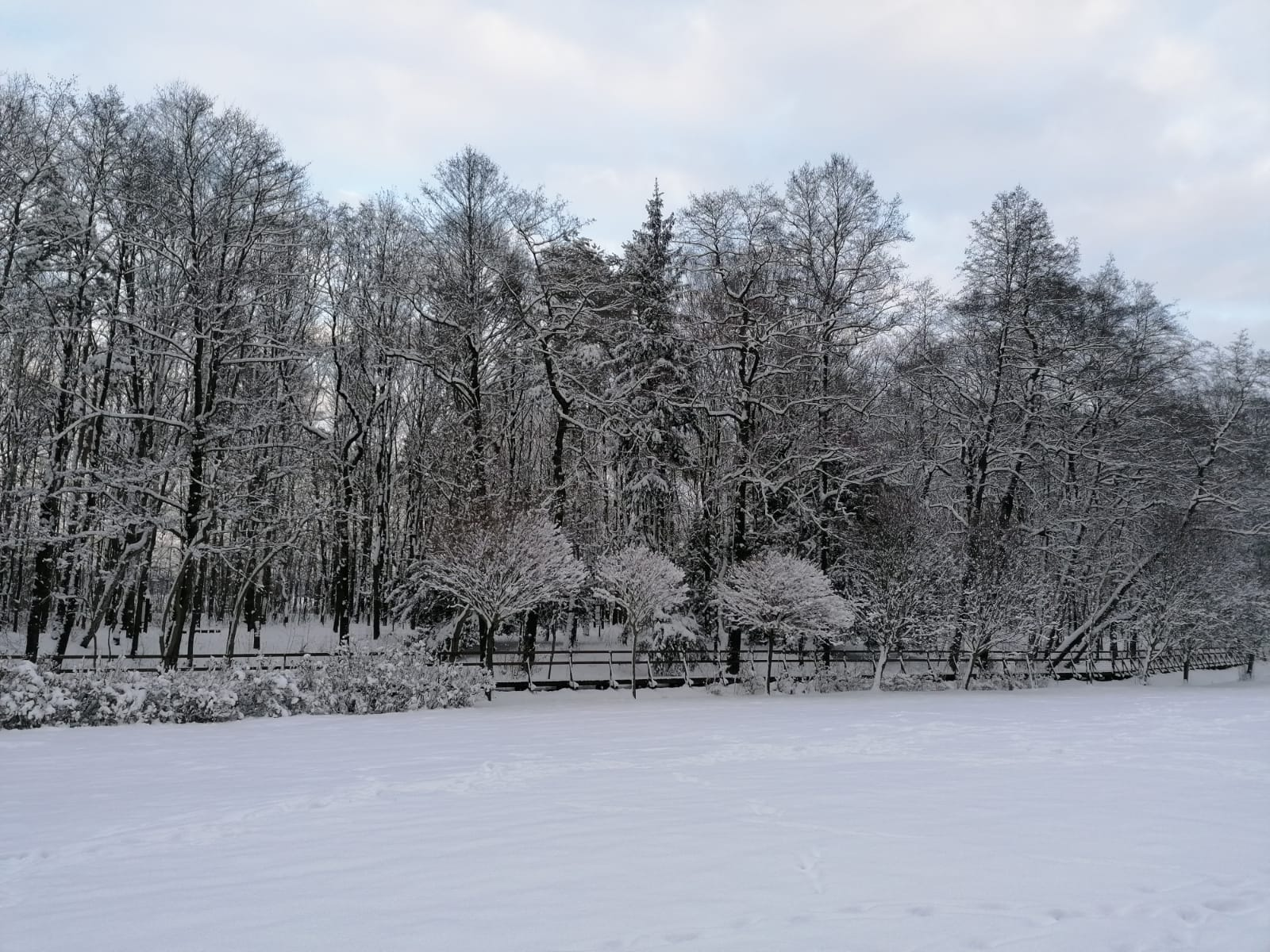
Fragment of Katowice Forest Park in winter

In Osiedle Paderewskiego-Muchowiec, between 1961 and 1990, the most frequently measured winds were southwesterly (19.3% of all winds), northwesterly (15.1%), and westerly (14.1%). The least frequent winds during the measured period were from the north (6.0%) and northeast (6.4%), and 11% of the time between 1961 and 1990 was calm. The average wind speed during this period was 1.3 m/s. Winds blowing from the southwest promote ventilation of the district, reducing air pollution levels, while winds from other directions have the opposite effect.

The climate of Osiedle Paderewskiego-Muchowiec is modified by local factors (topoclimate), which depend on the land cover and the location in relation to river valleys. The topoclimate of the areas located directly around the ponds in the Leśny Stream valley is the most unfavorable. There is frequent heat radiation there, and the high amount of moisture causes a significant increase in evaporation, which draws heat. In densely built-up areas, the local climate is influenced by the warming of the atmosphere as a result of human activity. Dense areas of buildings, roads, and squares cause an increase in air temperature in the ground layer of the atmosphere. These areas also lose heat more quickly due to radiation at night, and the lack of moisture in the air is not conducive to prolonged heat retention. The most favorable topoclimatic conditions are found in the area of the Katowice-Muchowiec Airfield and directly north of the 3 Stawy shopping center in the vicinity of the A4 motorway. The topoclimate there is typical of flat areas above valley bottoms. The inflow of heat from deeper layers counteracts large drops in temperature in the surface air layer during clear nights. In forests, relatively low values of long-wave ground heat radiation are recorded, and nighttime temperature drops are smaller than in neighboring areas.

=== Nature and environmental protection ===
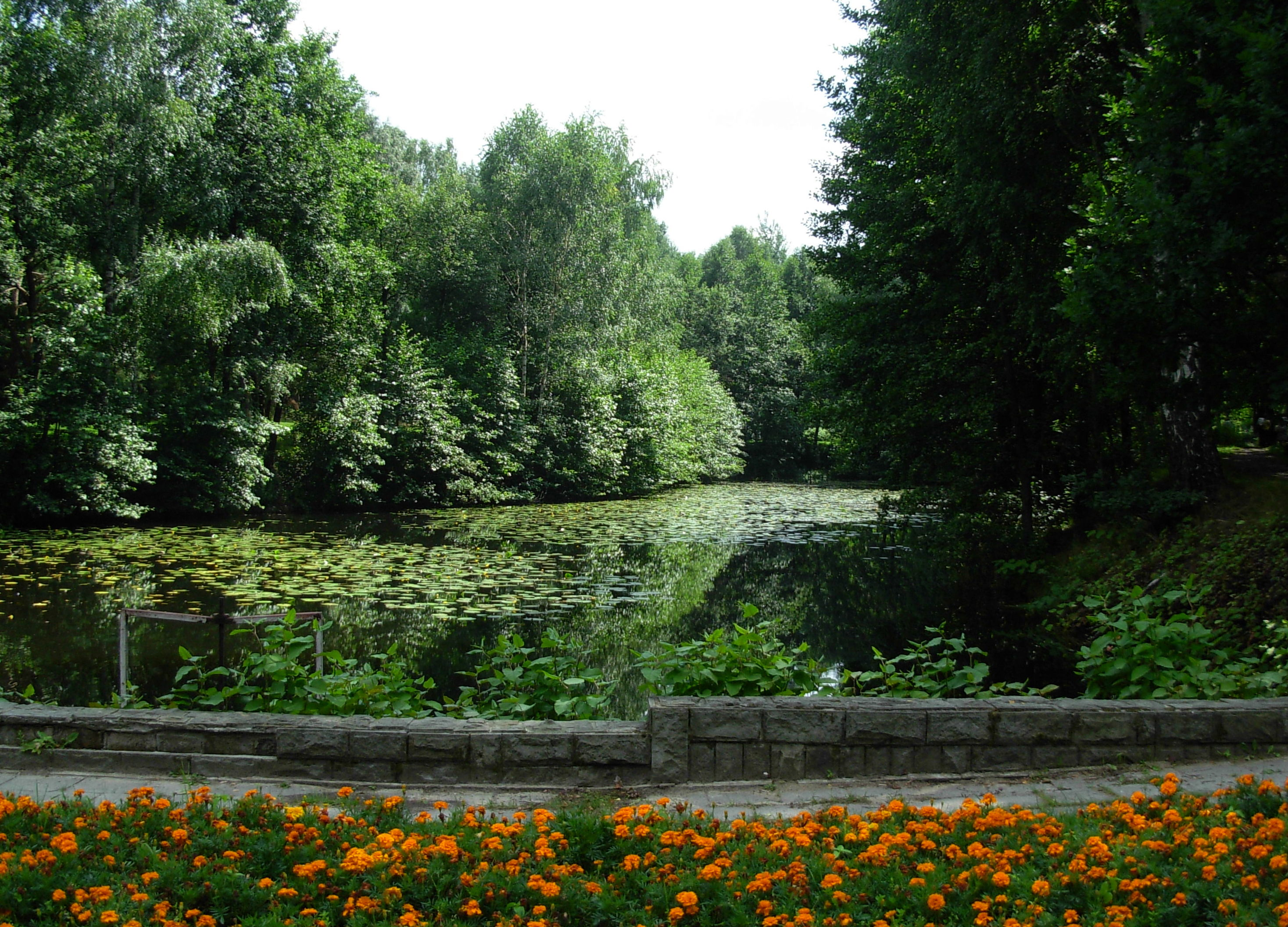
Fragment of the Katowice Forest Park in 2007

The natural vegetation in Osiedle Paderewskiego-Muchowiec has been shaped since the last glaciations between 12,000 and 16,000 years ago. Over the last 200 years, it has been subjected to strong anthropopression. Originally, the area was quite diverse in terms of plant communities – the areas closer to the Rawa river were covered with temperate coniferous forests, the western part of the present-day district was covered with beech forests, while the areas to the east and south were covered with oak-hornbeam forests. The valley of the Leśny Stream was a habitat for riparian forests and alder carrs.

The urban development of the district has led to a reduction in natural elements. In more urbanized habitats, ruderal species began to develop, among others. Conditions were also created for the development of synanthropic animals, the most important of which are birds, including those that have long accompanied humans, such as the house sparrow and pigeon, as well as native birds that have adapted to urban conditions, including swifts, house martins, and barn swallows. Along with the development of human activity, there were also changes in the environment, including the terrain (spoil tips and sinkholes), the hydrological network (including the canalization of rivers and the creation of artificial reservoirs), and the flora and fauna. As a result, some large animals have disappeared (only red deers and wild boars remain), and new ones associated with open areas have appeared. In addition, alien species of plants and animals have also appeared. Some animals were deliberately introduced there (mainly fish).

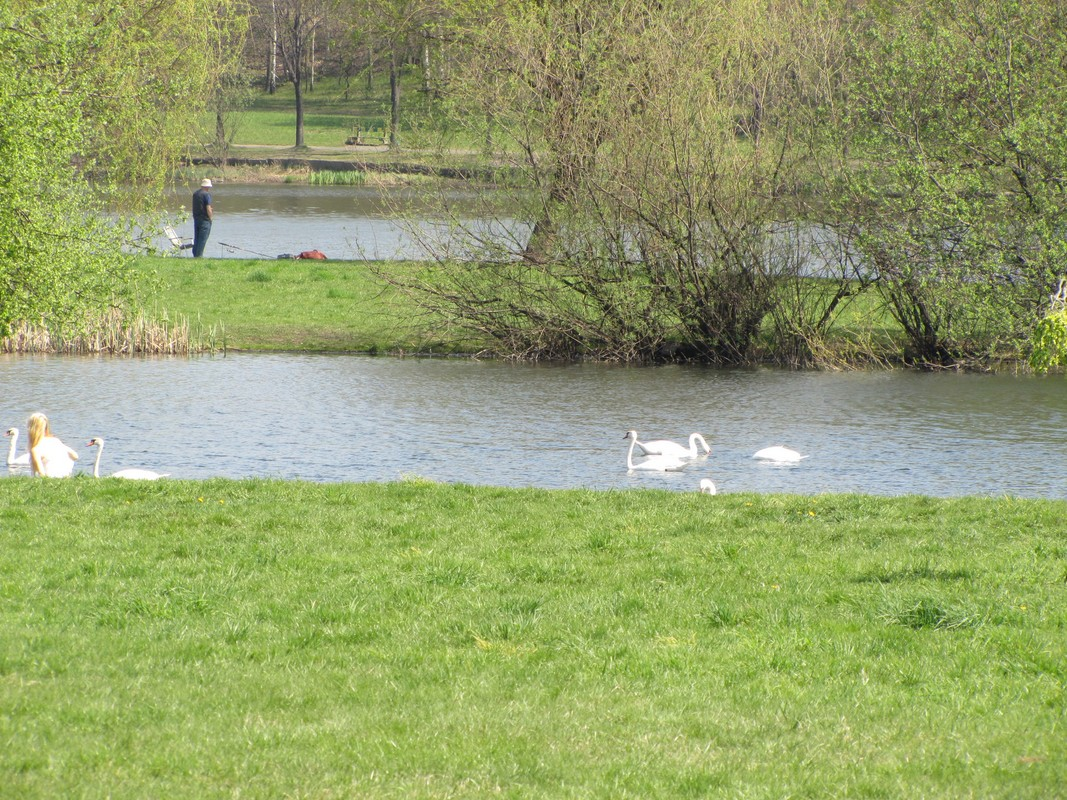
Swans in the Valley of Three Ponds

Currently, cultivated green areas and commercial forests mainly cover the southern part of the district. Riparian communities are also found in the river valleys Leśny Stream, and alder dominates the tree stand in these forests. Ash, willows, and poplars are less common there. The forests in Osiedle Paderewskiego-Muchowiec are managed by the Ochojec Forestry District, and the species composition of these forests is dominated by silver birch, oaks (including red oak), Scotch pine, Norway spruce, and, to a lesser extent, other tree species. In August 2007, the forests located in the Muchowiec urban unit, which are owned by the State Forests National Forest Holding, covered an area of 163.50 ha, while forests not owned by the State Treasury covered an area of 16.84 ha. The total area of protection forests in Muchowiec at that time was 173.53 ha, and their classification as protection forests is due to their location within the administrative boundaries of Katowice and their permanent damage as a result of industrial activity.

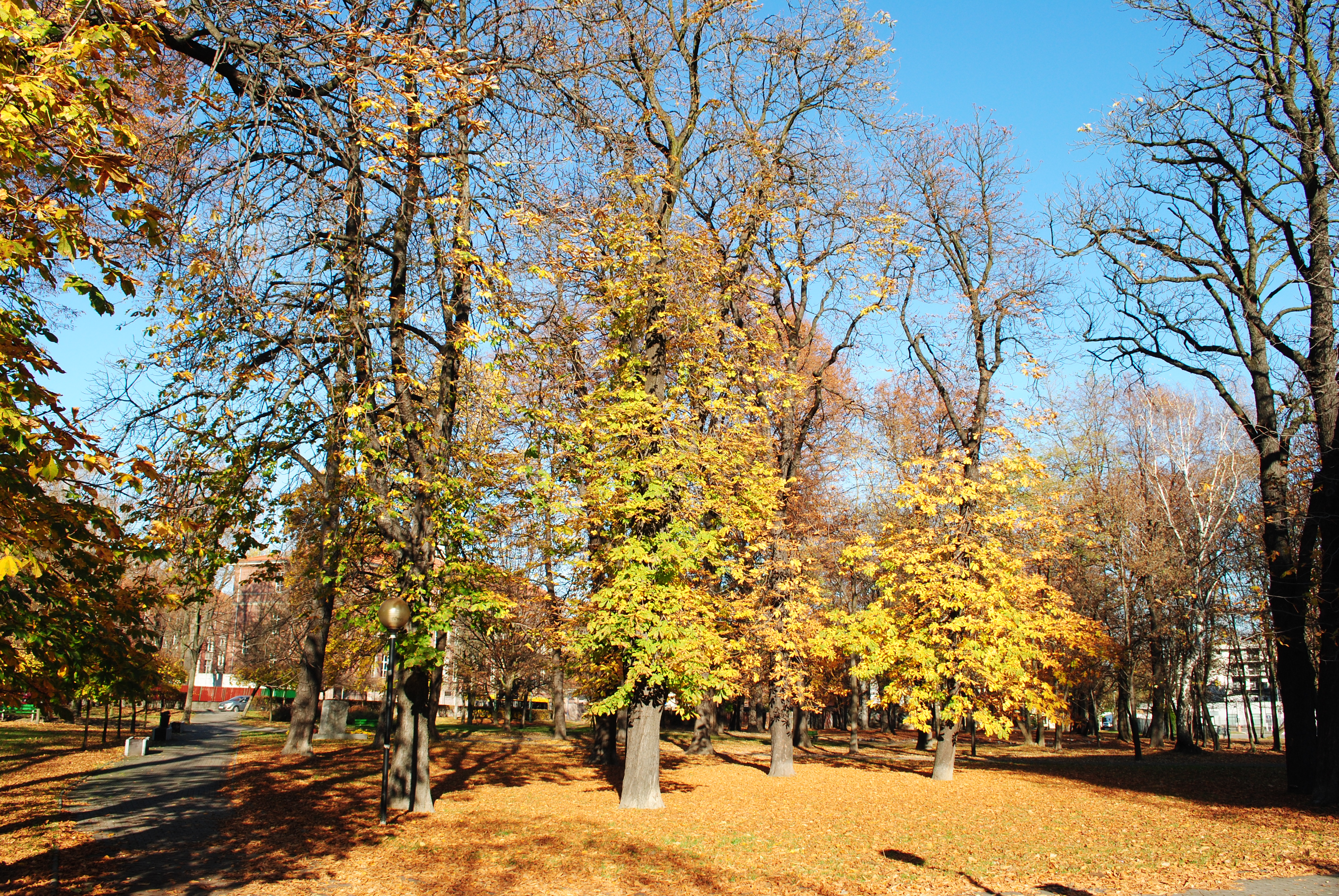
Fragment of R. Holtze Square in autumn 2020

A significant part of the district is covered by landscaped green areas. Located in Osiedle Paderewskiego-Muchowiec, Katowice Forest Park is the largest urban green area in Katowice in terms of size. The park covers an area of 284.67 ha, of which 159 ha is forest. The park's management office is located at 180a Francuska Street. Part of the park also includes the Valley of Three Ponds, which is intensively landscaped. The forests mainly cover the part of the park south of the A4 motorway, and the entire park is classified as an area of high natural value. There are numerous protected plant species there, and the park is also a feeding and breeding ground for a number of animal species, mainly amphibians. The park also protects the remains of the moist deciduous forests of the upper Pszczyna Forests within the city limits.

The Valley of Three Ponds park, covering an area of 65.5 ha, is located in the vicinity of urban areas and is used quite intensively for recreational purposes. There is also considerable environmental diversity there – three species of protected plants and several species of protected amphibians have been found there. The valley is also a feeding ground for many species of birds. The vegetation of the Valley of Three Ponds area is a mosaic of various types of communities with varying degrees of natural and semi-natural values. They are also accompanied by synanthropic and cultivated vegetation.

== History ==
=== Until World War II ===
Settlement in Osiedle Paderewskiego-Muchowiec dates back to the 14th century. During this period, in 1360, the village of Jaźwce, located within the boundaries of the present-day Muchowiec, was mentioned for the first time. In this document, Duke Nicholas II sold several localities – including Bogucice, Jaźwce, Roździeń, Szopienice, Załęże, and the city of Mysłowice – to Otto of Pilcza, retaining feudal sovereignty over them. Since the 16th century, the village has been uninhabited; it appears as an abandoned settlement in documents concerning the sale of the Mysłowice estates, together with Kozińce and Szopienice, from 1536. In the 17th century, Jaźwce is no longer mentioned in documents, and later the area of the former village was overgrown with forests.

On the border between the present-day Śródmieście and Osiedle Paderewskiego-Muchowiec, a settlement of Karbowa was founded in the 16th century, which was a hamlet of Kuźnica Bogucka. The first mention of Karbowa dates back to 1598, and originally Karbowa consisted of a folwark and a folwark settlement. In the 17th century, Muchowiec was founded, which was then a hamlet of Katowice.

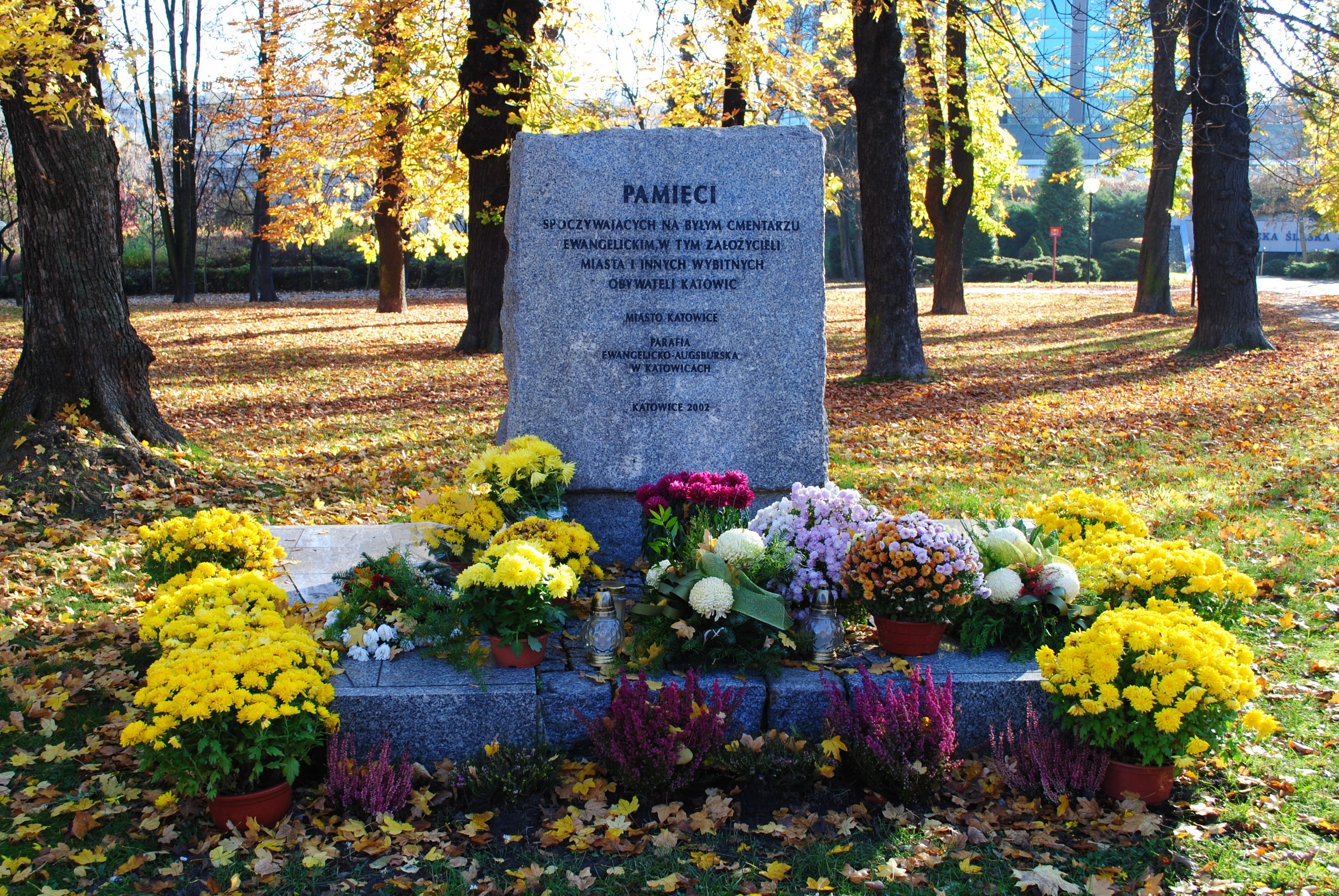
Plaque commemorating those buried in the former Evangelical cemetery, located at the site of the old Evangelical cemetery established in 1856 (R. Holtze Square)

In the 18th century, there was already a road that followed the route of the present-day Francuska Street. At the beginning of the 19th century, this road was an important route connecting Katowice with Karbowa and continuing on to Muchowiec. In the mid-19th century, another road existed, connecting Zawodzie with Murcki and further with Tychy through what would later become Kolonia Zuzanny, along the route of which the present-day Murckowska Street runs. At that time, most of the road ran through the forest. Around 1901, it was given the name Emanuelssegenstrasse, and around 1920, the street received its current name. In 1856, the first Evangelical cemetery within the then boundaries of Katowice was established in the area of Osiedle Paderewskiego-Muchowiec. It was located on what is now Konstanty Damrot Street, on the site of the current R. Holtze Square.

Between 1842 and 1843, a small Albert mine operated in the area of Osiedle Paderewskiego-Muchowiec, and between 1855 and 1859, the Schilling mine, which briefly resumed mining in 1864. In the eastern part of the district, Kolonia Zuzanny was established in the 1870s for miners working at the Susanne coal mine. It was built on the grounds of the former Gmina Janów. The colony's residential buildings were overcrowded – at that time, an average of 22 people lived in each small house. The Susanna mine itself received its concession on 13 April 1838. It was originally owned by a mining company formed by Traugott Knaut and Aleksander Mieroszewski. The mine extracted coal in the Reserve mining field. Part of the field was purchased in 1899 by the Georg von Giesches Erben company, which incorporated it into the Giesche mine (later known as the Wieczorek mine) in 1900.

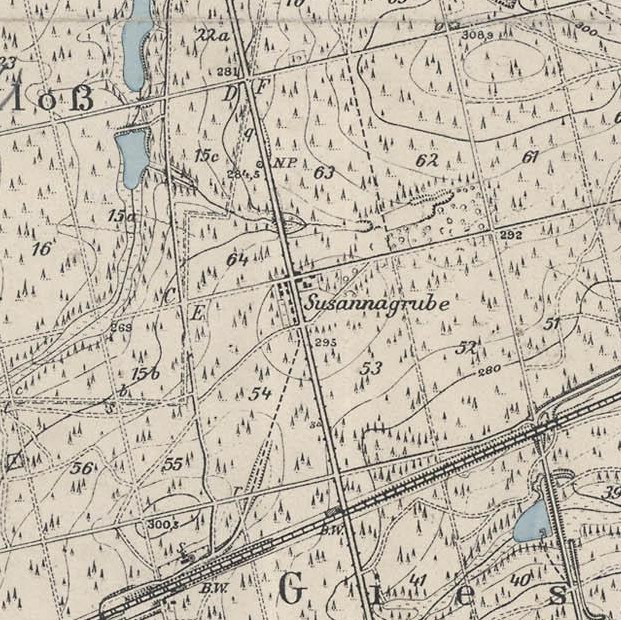
Fragment of a map published in 1907 showing the areas of today's Murckowska road junction; in the center, the former Kolonia Zuzanny is marked

In the 19th century, Karbowa became a center of zinc metallurgy, and its development was closely linked to neighboring Katowice. In 1842, the Emma zinc smelter was opened in Karbowa, in the area of the current junction of Francuska Street and the A4 motorway, and familoks began to be built next to it. These buildings were small and had no access to utilities, and an average of 2–4 families lived in them. The smelter itself was a small plant. In 1876, it produced 394 tons of zinc, but by 1880 it had become obsolete and was shut down. Part of the Karbowa farmland was purchased by the Ferdynand mine (later known as the Katowice mine) for the construction of a housing estate for its employees.

The lands of Karbowa were incorporated into the borders of the new city on 11 September 1865, the same day Katowice was granted town privileges. At that time, the Katowice manor area, which continued to function without change, included, among others, the areas south of Karbowa towards Muchowiec. On 24 June 1870, the part of the Right Bank Oder Railway running through the district between Szopienice Północne and Murcki was put into operation.

At the turn of the 19th and 20th centuries, residential buildings for employees of nearby brickworks were erected in the Muchowiec area. At the end of the 19th century, a hunting lodge was also built there. At the beginning of the 20th century, the now defunct Forest Castle (German: Wilhelmstal) was built in its place, on Francuska Street, in the area of today's bus terminus. From the beginning of the 20th century, Muchowiec began to transform into a recreational center. A restaurant was established in the castle itself.

At the end of the 19th century, builder Max Schalscha opened a steam-powered brickworks on the site of the current Francuska 70 office building. From the beginning of the 20th century, there were two such plants operating in the Karbowa area.

On 1 April 1909, the western parts of the Mysłowice Zamek manor lands, which had been cut off from Mysłowice after the creation of the Giszowiec manor area, were incorporated into the Katowice manor area. The incorporated areas included the regions of today's Muchowiec airfield and the Valley of Three Ponds. Exactly ten years later, on 1 April 1919, part of the Katowice manor lands, including a fragment in the vicinity of Karbowa, was incorporated into Bogucice. The city of Katowice itself expressed its opposition to this decision.

In 1924, the Muchowiec area was incorporated into the city of Katowice with the liquidation of the Katowice-Zamek manor area on 30 June 1924, and the incorporation of the former manor area into the city limits the following day. In the same year, on 15 October 1924, the former Gmina Bogucice, among others, was incorporated into Katowice. On the initiative of the Airborne and Antigas Defence League in the 1920s, a sports airfield – Katowice-Muchowiec Airfield – was built within the boundaries of the present-day district. Soon, it also began to handle passenger flights – the first of which took place on 2 January 1929. In the interwar period, the forest areas in Muchowiec and Kolonia Zuzanny were among the recreational areas for the residents of Katowice, and in the summer, the Maritime and Colonial League organized open swimming pools in the Valley of Three Ponds.

Military operations during World War II in the entire Katowice area had been ongoing since 1 September 1939, when the German Air Force bombed the Muchowiec airfield. On 3 and 4 September 1939, self-defense units from Karbowa actively resisted Wehrmacht troops advancing from Brynów.

=== Post-war years ===
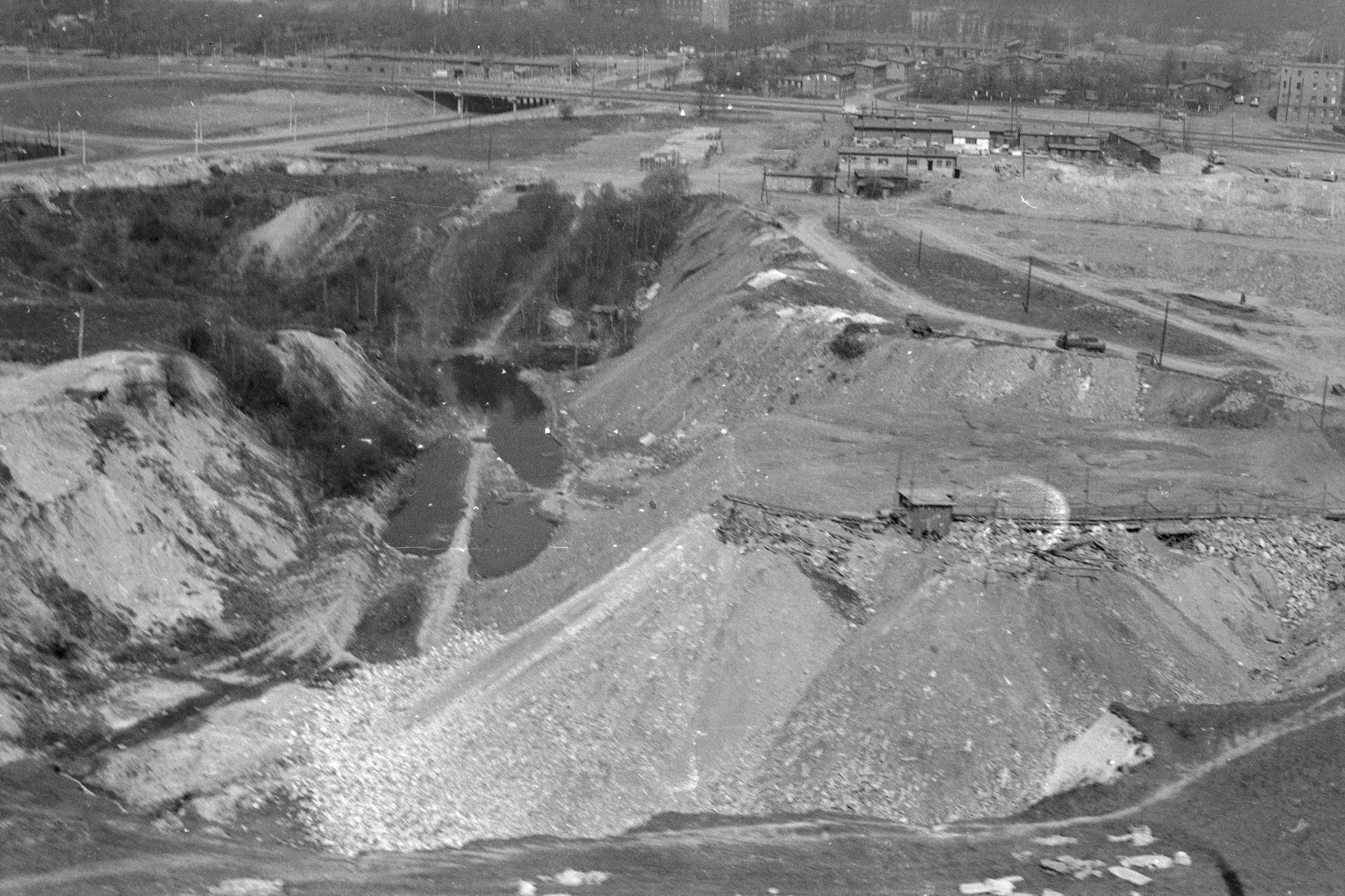
Aerial photograph from 1974 showing the area around today's junction of Francuska Street and the A4 motorway; in the foreground, the area of the present-day WORD Katowice and the Francuska 70 office building, while at that time, the Karbowa brickworks was in the foreground, and on the other side of Górnośląska Avenue, in the upper right part of the photograph, the buildings of the now defunct Karbowa settlement are visible

After World War II, barracks for various offices and companies, as well as warehouses, began to be built in the Karbowa area. In the 1950s, a classification yard was built in Muchowiec in order to transfer freight train traffic from the center of Katowice. Construction of the Church of the Assumption of Mary on Graniczna Street began on 2 May 1951, and its dedication took place on 1 November 1951. In February 1959, in the area of Kolonia Zuzanny, work began on the construction of the 550-meter-deep shaft V of the Staszic Coal Mine. It is intended as a materials and personnel shaft. Passenger operations at Muchowiec airport continued until 15 June 1959 – its further operation was prevented by mining damage that had occurred there. The lands of Kolonia Zuzanny were incorporated into Katowice on 31 December 1959.

In the 1960s, Katowice Forest Park was established in the southern part of Osiedle Paderewskiego-Muchowiec, and in the same period, the demolition of Karbowa's buildings began. On 1 April 1967, a new base for the Provincial Emergency Medical Service in Katowice was opened at 52 Powstańców Street. The site of the old Evangelical cemetery on K. Damrot Street, devastated after World War II, had been a green area since the 1970s, which was adapted into a square.

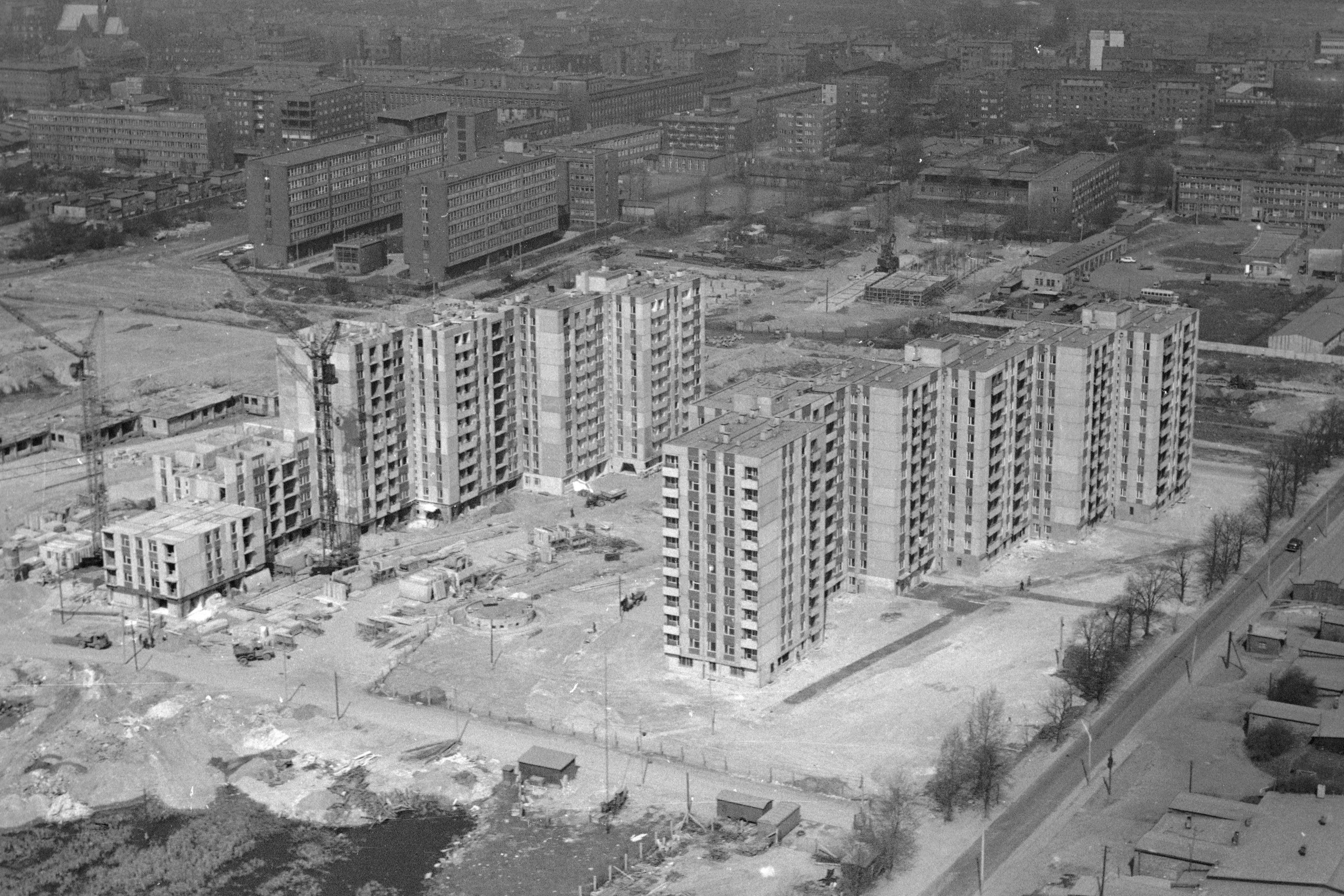
Construction of Osiedle Paderewskiego (1974)

In the 1970s, Osiedle Paderewskiego was built in Karbowa and partly in Zawodzie, consisting of 11-story multi-family buildings. The decision to build the estate was made in 1965. A total of six teams participated in the design competition, and the winning concept was created by a team of architects from Katowice-based Miastoprojekt: Jurand Jarecki, Stanisław Kwaśniewicz and Ryszard Ćwikliński. Work on the construction of the estate began in 1970 and took place in three stages, the last of which was completed in 1980. The investor for the estate was the Katowice Housing Cooperative.

On 24 May 1971, a part of Górnośląska Avenue running through Osiedle Paderewskiego-Muchowiec was opened, connecting the former Mikołów roundabout (now a junction with Mikołowska Street) with Murckowska Street. In the 1970s, this road was expanded to two lanes in each direction, and a collision-free junction was built at the intersection with Francuska Street. Construction of an interchange at the intersection with Murckowska Street also began. In 1975, work began on the reconstruction of Murckowska Street into a road with three lanes in both directions. The project necessitated the demolition of the buildings of Kolonia Zuzanny in the 1970s and 1980s. In 1983, the name of the colony was removed from the maps of Katowice.

In 1978, the Monument to the Polish Soldier was unveiled in Osiedle Paderewskiego, which during the Polska Ludowa era was the site of a number of state ceremonies. Between 1980 and 1983, a new church dedicated to the Assumption of Mary was built to replace the existing one. It was dedicated on 11 October 1997. In the 1980s, K. Pułaski Street was extended under Górnośląska Avenue. Near the new exit, the Monument to Mining Labour by Tadeusz Łodziana was erected between 1985 and 1986.

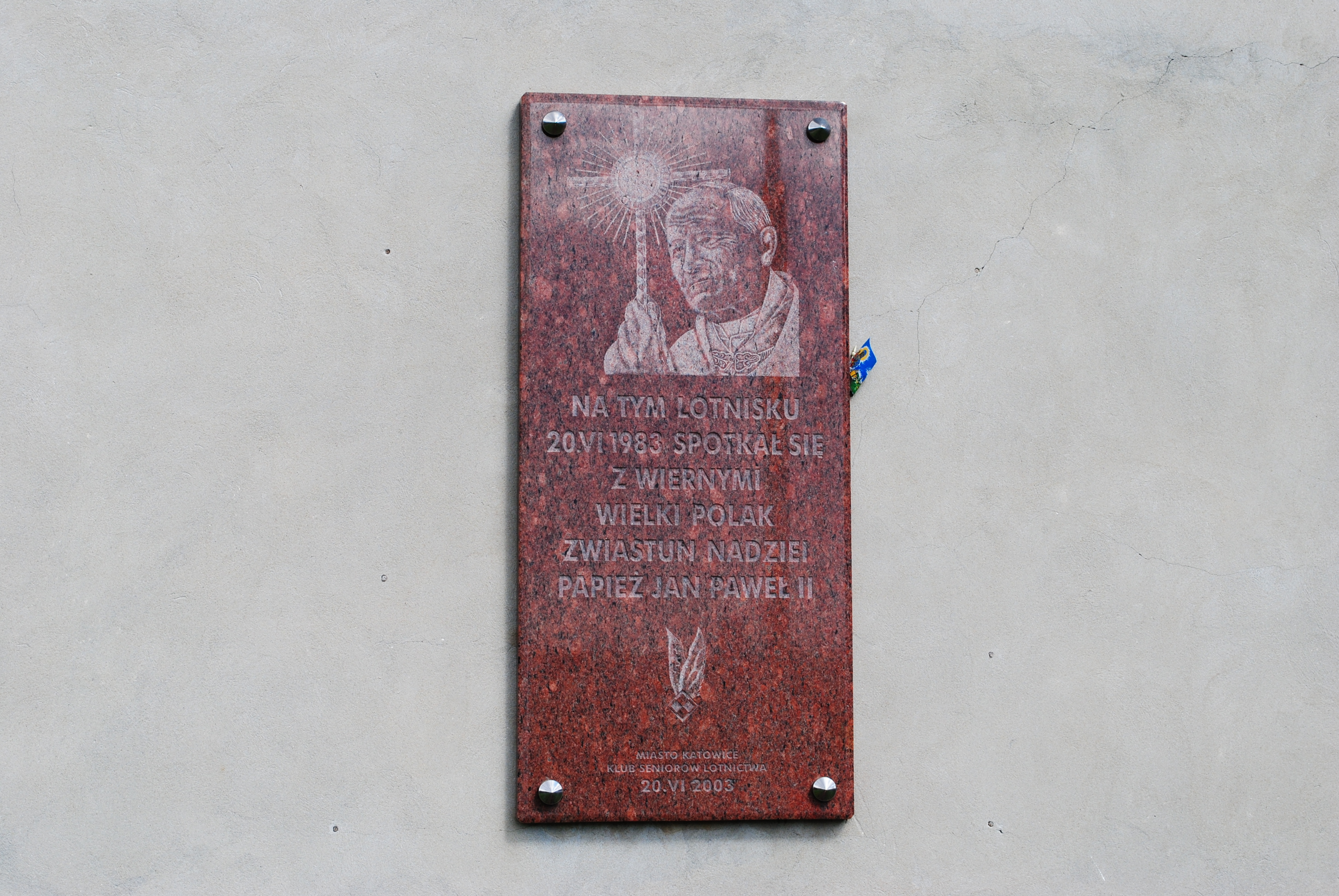
Plaque commemorating the visit of Pope John Paul II, who met with the faithful at the Muchowiec airfield on 20 April 1983

On 20 June 1983, Pope John Paul II arrived at the Muchowiec airfield during his second pilgrimage to Poland. A service was held there in front of a specially brought painting of Our Lady of Piekary. The Pope was welcomed by the Metropolitan Bishop of Katowice, Herbert Bednorz, together with his auxiliary bishops, the Governor of Katowice, Roman Paszkowski, the Chairman of the Provincial National Council, Zbigniew Messner, and the Mayor of Katowice, Edward Mecha. According to Security Service estimates, approximately 900,000 people participated in the service organized at the airfield, while the church estimated the number of faithful who attended at 1.5 million.

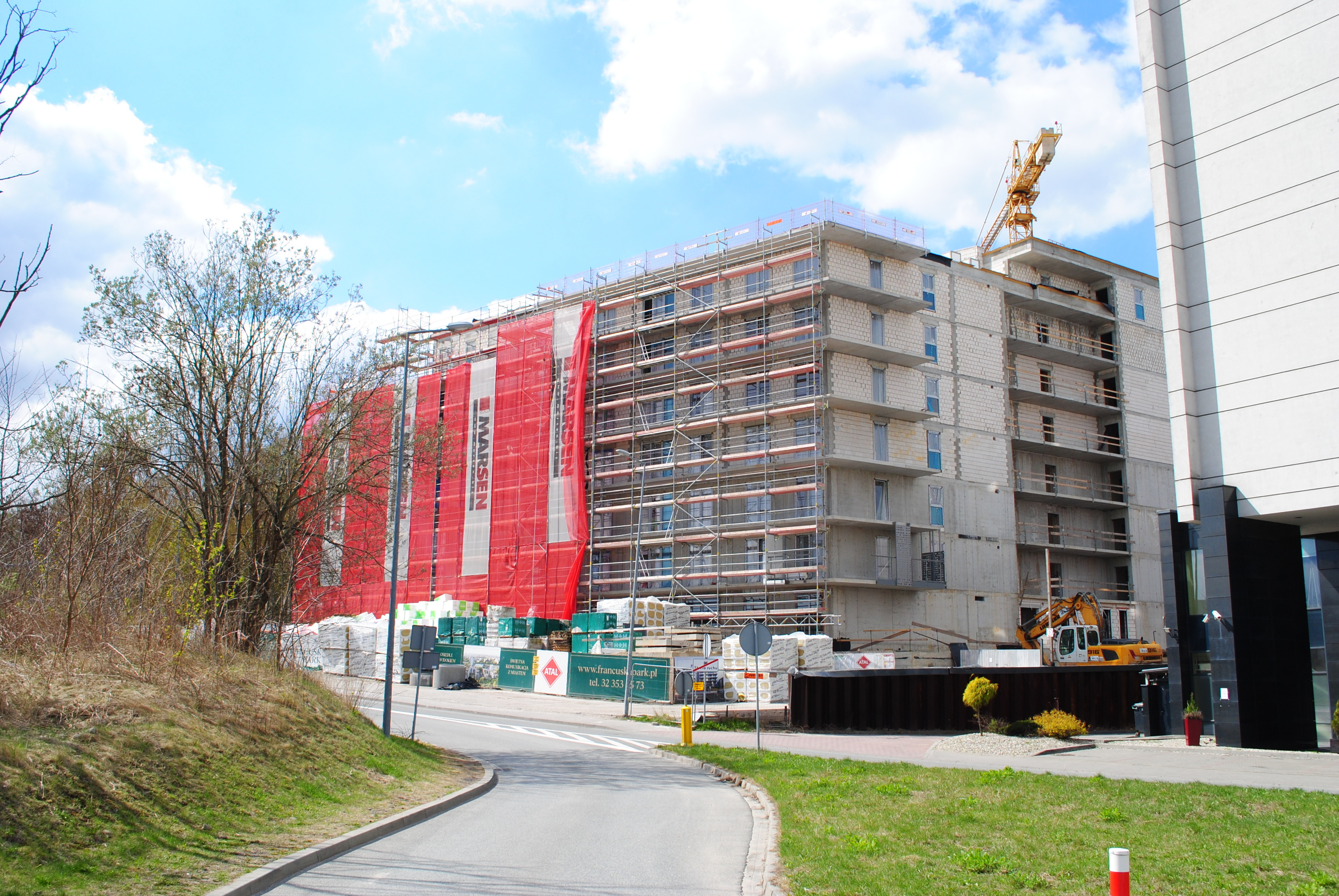
Construction of Osiedle Francuska Park in April 2022

On 16 September 1991, the Katowice City Council adopted a resolution dividing Katowice into 22 auxiliary local government units and 22 areas of operation on 1 January 1992. At that time, local government unit No. 4, Osiedle Paderewskiego-Muchowiec, was also established. In the 1990s, several modern office buildings and public facilities were built in the area of Council of Europe Square: a branch of PKO Bank Polski in 1990, the building of the Silesian Library in 1998 (or 1997), and a branch of the then BRE Bank in 1999. On 30 October 1996, a part of the A4 motorway between Murckowska Street and Mysłowice was opened, and in the same year, the modernization of the route to Francuska Street was completed. The road between the Murckowska junction and the Francuska junction was rebuilt into a motorway by 2001. Thanks to the proximity of the expressway connecting Wrocław and Kraków, a network of retail and service outlets began to develop in Osiedle Paderewskiego-Muchowiec, including the 3 Stawy shopping center, which was opened in 1999 and modernized in 2014.

Since the 1990s, Osiedle Paderewskiego-Muchowiec has become a place for the development of new residential investments, especially near the Valley of Three Ponds. In May 2011, a building permit was issued for Osiedle Francuska Park, located in the area of Francuska Street and in the vicinity of the Muchowiec airfield.

== Demography ==
Population structure in Osiedle Paderewskiego-Muchowiec by gender and age (as of 31 December 2015)
Period/Number of inhabitants	Pre-working age (0–18 years)	Working age (18–60/65 years)	Post-working age (over 60/65 years)	Total
Total	1,555	6,486	3,204	11,245
Women	770	3,271	2,155	6,196
Men	785	3,215	1,049	5,049
Femininisation ratio	98	102	205	123

In 1988, the area of the present-day Osiedle Paderewskiego-Muchowiec was inhabited by 14,337 people, with the largest share being people aged 30–44, and the smallest share being people over 60 years of age. In 2005, a total of 12,291 people lived in Osiedle Paderewskiego-Muchowiec, and two years later, in December 2007, the district had 12,253 inhabitants, which at that time accounted for 3.9% of the city's population. The population density was 1,651 people/km². At that time, Osiedle Paderewskiego-Muchowiec was the 13th largest of the 22 districts of Katowice in terms of population and the 15th in terms of population density. During that period, the share of individual population groups in terms of age was balanced, except for people aged 0–14, who were significantly fewer than the rest at that time. At the end of 2013, the district had 946 people over the age of 75.

On 31 December 2014, a total of 11,347 residents lived in Osiedle Paderewskiego-Muchowiec, and the population density at that time was 1,529 people/km², which was lower than the density in Katowice as a whole, which was 1,781 people/km² at that time. In terms of economic groups, 1,542 people of pre-working age (14% of the district's residents) lived there at that time, 6,674 people were of working age (59% of the total), and 3,131 residents of Osiedle Paderewskiego-Muchowiec were of post-working age (29% of all residents). In terms of gender, on 31 December 2014, 5,099 men and 6,248 women lived in Osiedle Paderewskiego-Muchowiec. The feminization ratio during this period was 123 and was the second highest (after Koszutka) among all districts of Katowice.

Sources: 1988; 1997; 2005; 2010; 2015; 2020.

According to a survey conducted in 2011, 63.6% of residents of Osiedle Paderewskiego-Muchowiec declared Polish nationality, 9.1% declared Silesian nationality (this was the second lowest percentage among all districts of Katowice, after Brynów-Osiedle Zgrzebnioka and on a par with Kostuchna), 25.0% declared both Silesian and Polish nationality, and 2.3% declared other nationalities.

According to demographic forecasts prepared in 2007, the population of the urban units of Brynów and Muchowiec, according to the biological forecast for 2030 in the pessimistic scenario, was estimated at 22,612 people for 2010, 20,994 people for 2020, and 18,455 for 2030, while in the optimistic scenario, the figures were 22,636, 21,279, and 19,064, respectively. In the case of Osiedle Paderewskiego and Osiedle Walentego Roździeńskiego urban unit, the pessimistic scenario estimated the number of residents in 2010 at 16,009, in 2020 at 14,960, and in 2030 at 13,037. In the optimistic scenario, the forecasts indicated 16,027, 15,157, and 13,441 people, respectively.

== Politics and administration ==
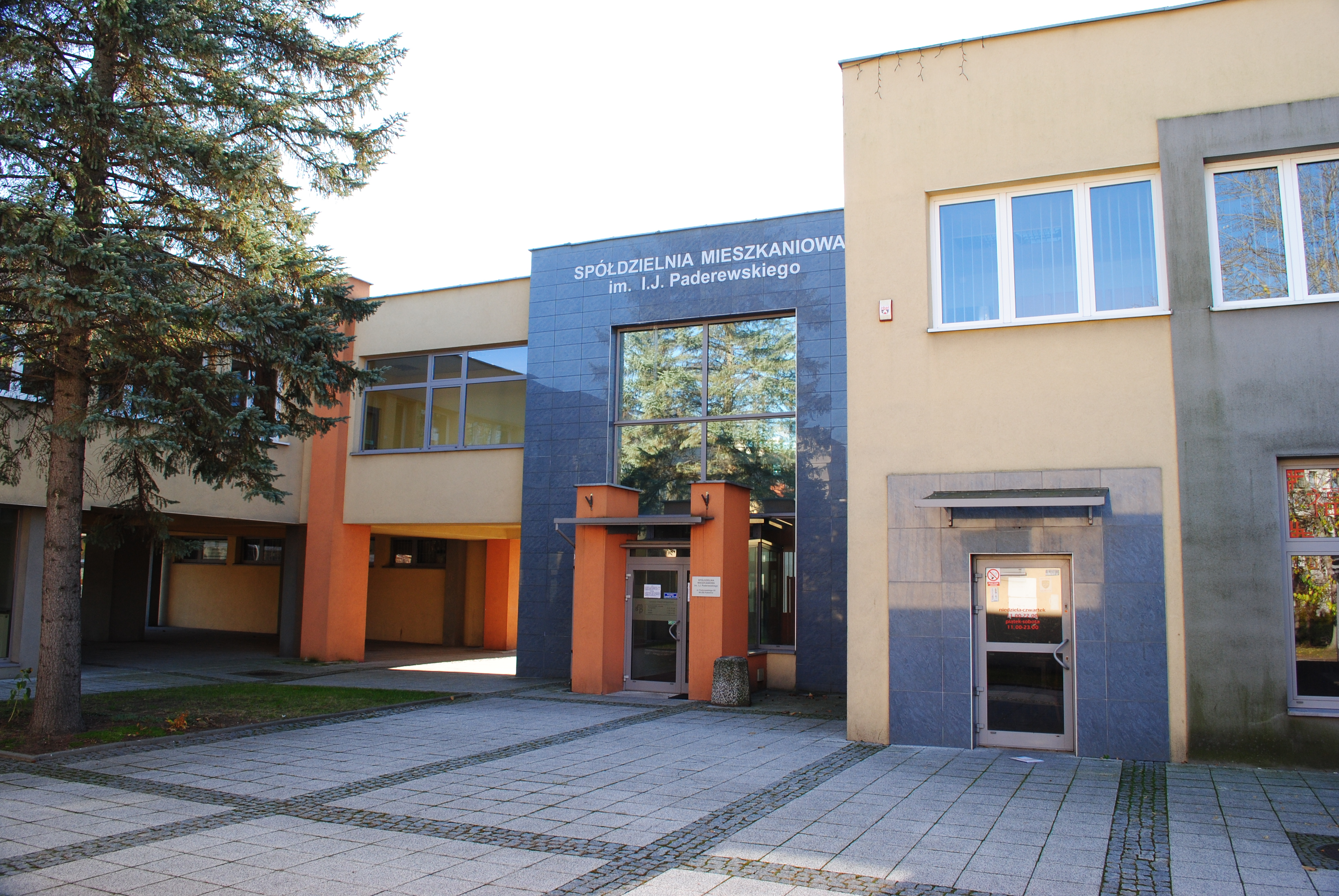
Headquarters of the I.J. Paderewski Housing Cooperative at 65 I.J. Paderewski Street

District No. 4, Osiedle Paderewskiego-Muchowiec, is one of 22 districts of Katowice, constituting an auxiliary unit of a gmina. It was established by a resolution of the Katowice City Council as local government unit (district) No. 4 on 1 January 1992. According to Resolution No. XLVI/449/97 of the Katowice City Council of 29 September 1997, Osiedle Paderewskiego-Muchowiec is a statutory district within the group of downtown districts.

The current district by-law was established by Resolution No. XLI/894/21 of the Katowice City Council on 25 November 2021. In accordance with the provisions of the statute, the district authorities are the District Council and the District Management Board. The District Council consists of 15 councilors elected for a five-year term. It is the decision-making body of the district, and the tasks of the District Council include, among others, submitting motions to the authorities of the city of Katowice on behalf of the district's residents within the scope of its activities, initiating and organizing special celebrations, cultural, sports, and recreational events, issuing opinions on local initiatives, and submitting motions on city matters concerning Osiedle Paderewskiego-Muchowiec. The District Management Board is the executive body of the district. The Chairman of the Management Board represents the district externally, and the tasks of the Management Board include accepting requests from district residents, organizing and coordinating social initiatives, informing residents about district matters, and preparing draft resolutions of the District Council.

The headquarters of the District Council of District No. 4 Osiedle Paderewskiego-Muchowiec is located in the Katowice City Hall building at 70 Francuska Street. In April 2022, Grzegorz Pająk was the Chairman of the District Council, while Adam Południak was the Chairman of the District Board.

Osiedle Paderewskiego, located in the district, is managed by the I.J. Paderewski Housing Cooperative, which is the third largest housing cooperative in Katowice after the Katowice Housing Cooperative and the Piast Housing Cooperative. In 2007, it had 4,100 members. At the end of 2019, the cooperative had 3,999 members, and a total of 7,255 people lived in its properties. The cooperative's properties include 4,146 apartments, 96 garages, and 240 commercial premises. The cooperative's headquarters are located at 65 I.J. Paderewski Street.

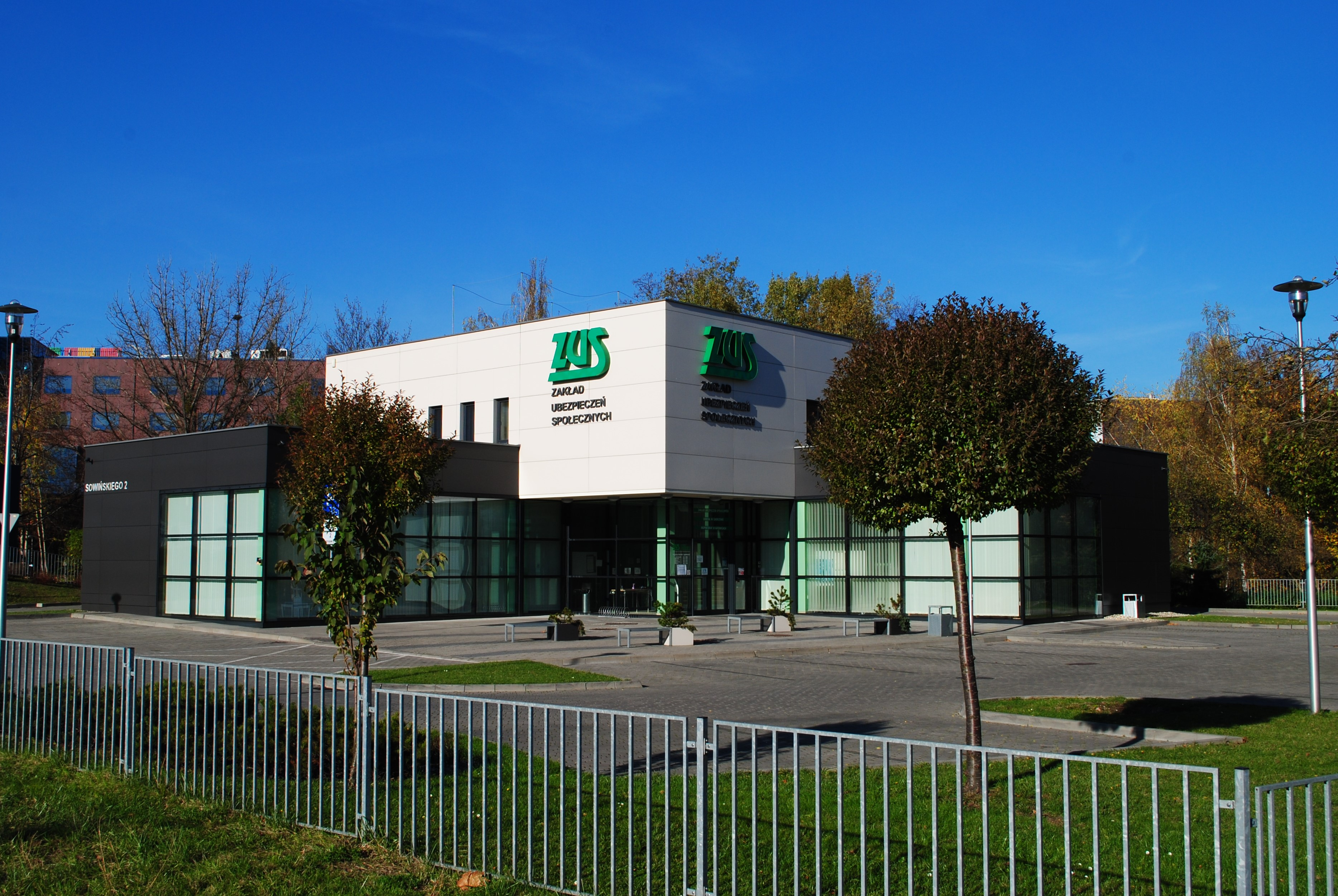
Social Insurance Institution. Inspectorate in Katowice (2 J.L. Sowiński Street)

The office building at 70 Francuska Street houses some of the departments of the Katowice City Hall, including the Vehicle Registration and Driving Licences Department, the Local Taxes and Fees Department, as well as the Office Records Archive. Some departments of the Katowice Municipal Social Welfare center are also located there. The District Court for Katowice-Wschód is located at 70a Francuska Street. As of mid-April 2022, the following administrative offices and authorities were located in other parts of Osiedle Paderewskiego-Muchowiec:

- Second Revenue Service in Katowice (32b I.J. Paderewski Street),
- Chamber of Tax Administration in Katowice (25 Konstanty Damrot Street),
- Education Superintendent's Office in Katowice (41a Powstańców Street),
- Provincial center for Geodetic and Cartographic Documentation in Katowice (29 Graniczna Street),
- Provincial Road Traffic center in Katowice and the Katowice Territorial Branch of the Provincial Road Traffic center (78 Francuska Street),
- Social Insurance Institution. Inspectorate in Katowice (2 J.L. Sowiński Street).

The headquarters of the Silesian-Dąbrowa Region Board of Solidarity is located at 7 Floriana Street in the district.

== Economy ==
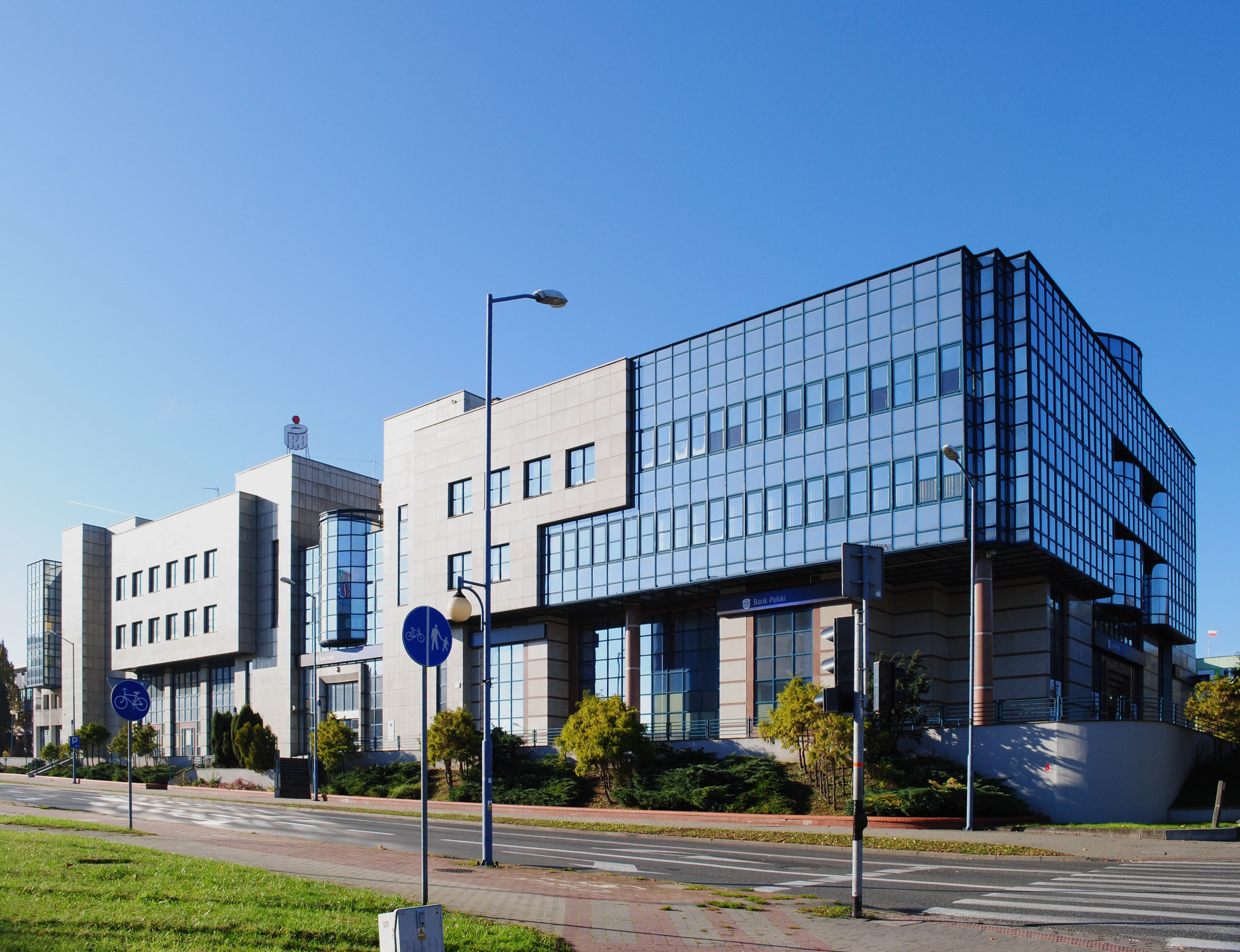
Branch 1 of PKO Bank Polski (23 K. Damrot Street)

The economy of Osiedle Paderewskiego-Muchowiec is diverse. As of 31 December 2013, there were 1,914 entities registered in the REGON system operating in the district, which at that time accounted for 4.2% of all entities in Katowice, and 1,780 of them were micro-enterprises. On 31 December 2013, there were 286 unemployed people registered in Osiedle Paderewskiego-Muchowiec (2.48% of the district's total population).

Osiedle Paderewskiego-Muchowiec is home to companies from various sectors of the economy. Among them, in mid-April 2022, the following were operating: construction companies Bipromet (29 Graniczna Street) and Energoaparatura (7 K. Pułaski Street), research and development company JSW Innowacje (41 I.J. Paderewski Street), Branch 1 of PKO Bank Polski (23 K. Damrot Street), pharmaceutical wholesaler Salus International (9 K. Pułaski Street), and video game industry company Keywords Studios (14b Murckowska Street). The railway transport company PKP Cargo also has one of its two headquarters in the district, at 44 Francuska Street.

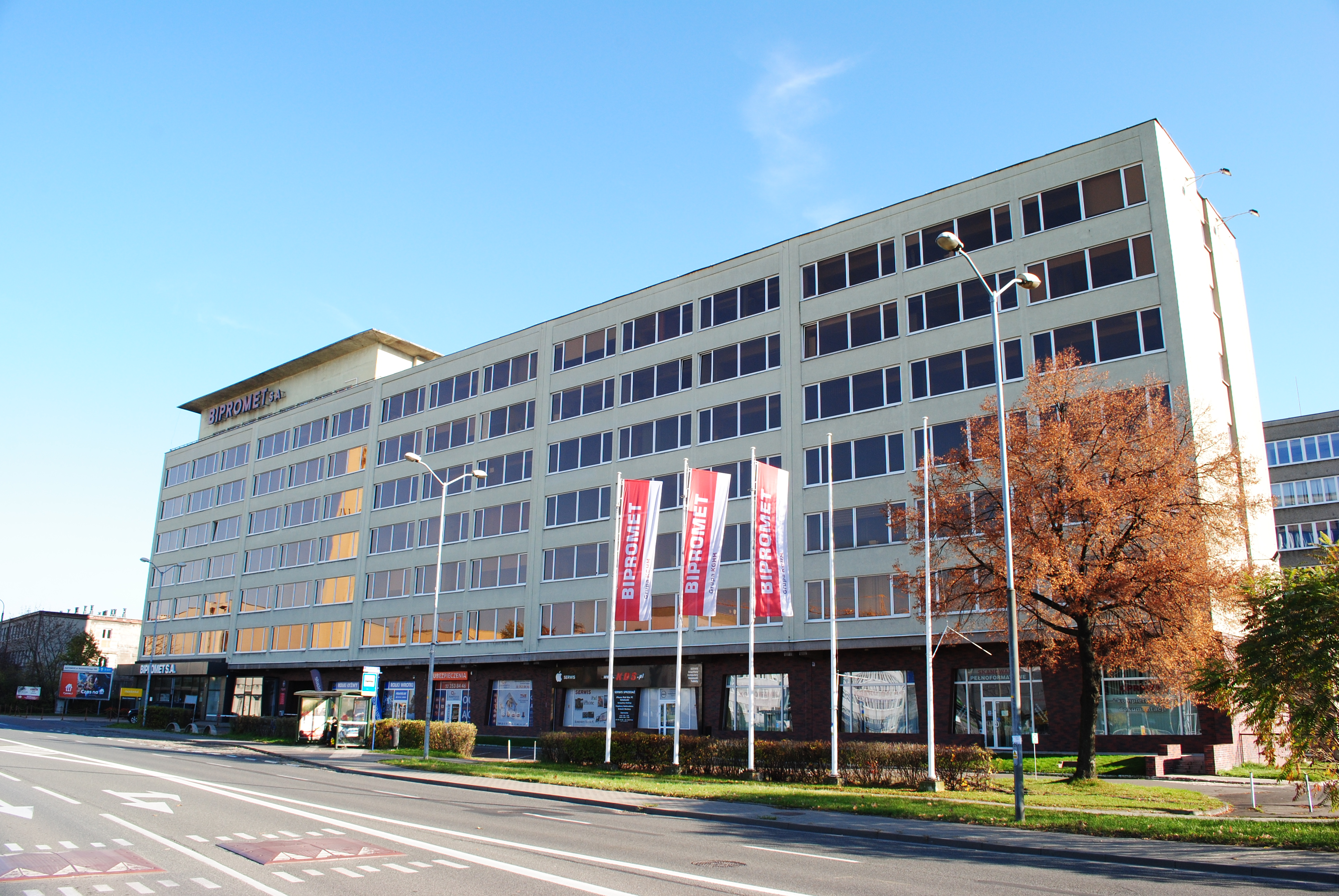
Headquarters of Bipromet company (29 Graniczna Street)

The former industrial areas located between Murckowska and K. Pułaski streets have been transformed into service facilities. Office areas also include the areas north of Górnośląska Avenue, where, among others, the mBank branch and the Atrium office building are located. At 14, 16, 18 and 20 Murckowska Street, there is the Green Park office and service complex with a total office space of 24,800 m², while on the border between Śródmieście and Osiedle Paderewskiego-Muchowiec, at 42 Francuska Street, the A4 Business Park office complex, owned by Echo Investment, has been built. The total office space of the complex is 31,000 m². The CZAH company's B+ class office building, located at 29 Zygmunt Krasiński Street, also serves as an office facility.

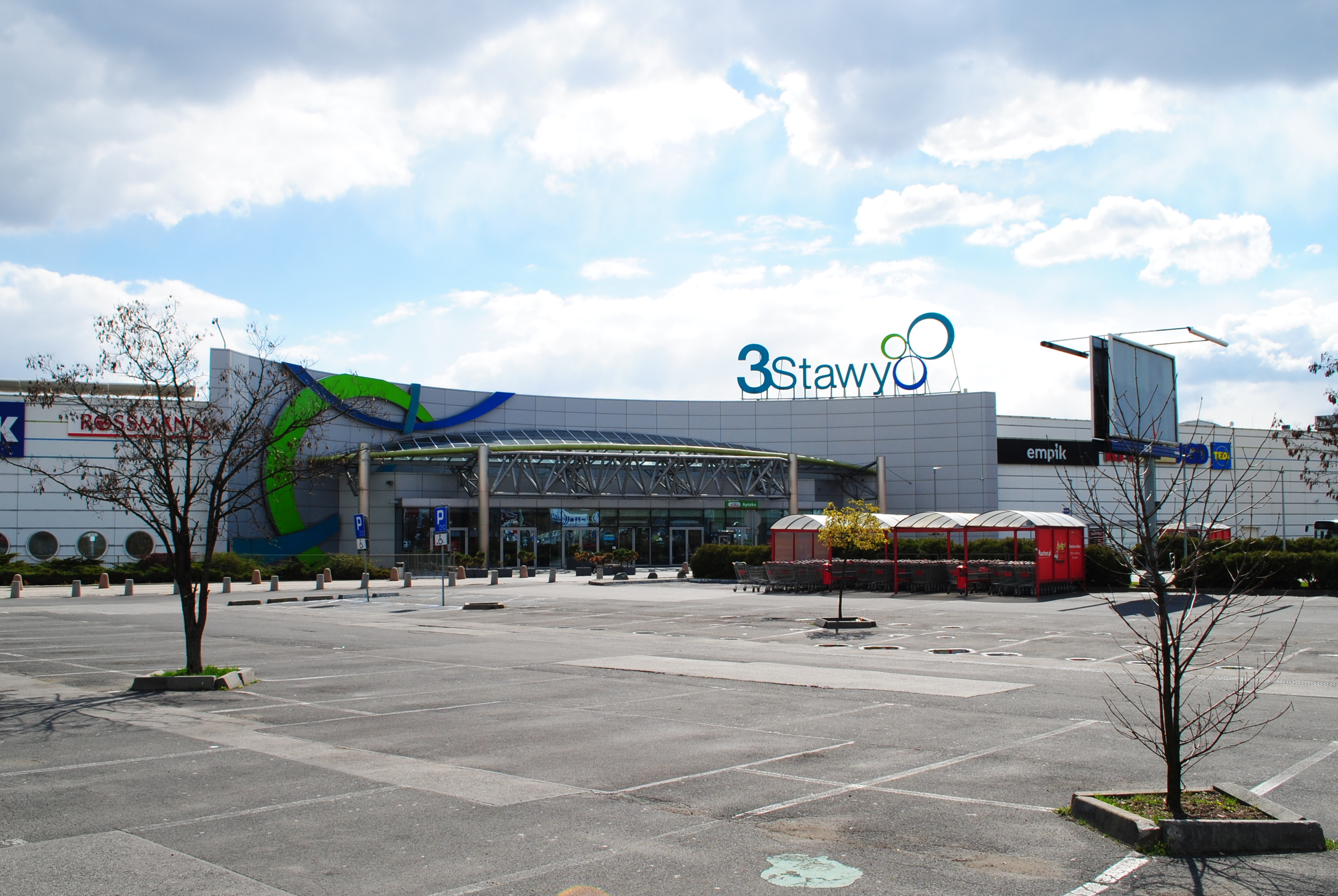
3 Stawy shopping center (60 K. Pułaski Street)

Osiedle Paderewskiego-Muchowiec is also home to a concentration of hotels, student residences, and other accommodation facilities. In April 2022, the following hotels were located there: Hotel Campanile Katowice (48 J. Sowiński Street) and Hotel Silesian (1a Szybowcowa Street). BaseCamp Katowice is located at 30 I.J. Paderewski Street, and leading Katowice universities also have student dormitories there, including: University of Silesia (Assistant's House No. 3; 32 I.J. Paderewski Street), Karol Szymanowski Academy of Music (Parnas Student House; 27 Z. Krasiński Street) and Silesian University of Technology in Gliwice (Babilon Student House; 25a Z. Krasiński Street).

The local commercial and service center of Osiedle Paderewskiego-Muchowiec is located in Osiedle Paderewskiego and covers the areas of Graniczna, Sowiński and Szeptycki streets. The commercial and service function of Osiedle Paderewskiego itself is mainly carried out on the ground floors of residential buildings and does not create typical multifunctional centers. The largest commercial facility in Osiedle Paderewskiego-Muchowiec is the 3 Stawy Retail Park, whose total retail space, according to 2007 data, was 34,414 m². The largest facility in the park is the 3 Stawy shopping center at 60 K. Pułaski Street, with a retail space of 23,300 m². The main retail attraction in the shopping center is the Auchan hypermarket, and there are 70 other stores and service outlets, including restaurants and cafes. The retail park has stores from many industries, including Leroy Merlin, MediaMarkt, Media Expert, Decathlon, Komfort, Action, and KFC.

== Technical infrastructure ==
Osiedle Paderewskiego-Muchowiec is supplied with running water from the Mikołów and Murcki network reservoirs. These are fed from water treatment plants in Dziećkowice, Goczałkowice-Zdrój, and Kobiernice. These waters are pumped into the shared distribution system of the Upper Silesian Water Supply Company, from where it is supplied to the district, among others, via the water main system and the associated distribution network of Katowice Waterworks. A water main with an internal diameter of 800/600 mm runs through the district: Valley of Three Ponds – Osiedle Paderewskiego, while in the area of the Murckowska junction and further south, there is a section of the GPW transit water main.

The sewage system in the district is operated by the Sewage System Operation Department – Center. The sewage system of Osiedle Paderewskiego-Muchowiec is located in the drainage basin of the Gigablok sewage treatment plant. Within Osiedle Paderewskiego itself, the network is divided into sanitary and storm sewers. The estate is located on the outskirts of the drainage basin, and sanitary sewage is discharged into combined sewers. Within the boundaries of Osiedle Paderewskiego-Muchowiec, the main combined sewers run along Francuska Street north of the junction with the A4 motorway and along the northern part of Graniczna Street.

The district is supplied with electricity via a 110 kV high-voltage network connected to nearby power plants. The electrical grid runs through Osiedle Paderewskiego-Muchowiec only fragmentarily. One 110 kV line, connected to the Francuska substation located in the city center, runs parallel to Francuska Street between the A4 motorway and Ceglana Street. The second 110 kV line connects in two sections to the Giszowiec substation in Giszowiec at 73 Pułku Piechoty Street and runs through Osiedle Paderewskiego-Muchowiec on the north side of the street in an easterly direction.

Osiedle Paderewskiego-Muchowiec is supplied with thermal energy from the former Katowice Heat and Power Plant (currently the Katowice Power Station), operated by TAURON Ciepło.

Gas in Osiedle Paderewskiego-Muchowiec is supplied via a gas pipeline network, with a 150 mm diameter CN 1.6 MPa gas pipeline branch running to the Katowice Paderewskiego Housing Estate reduction and metering station. According to data from December 2004, this station had a capacity of 3,000 m³/h.

== Transport ==
=== Road transport ===
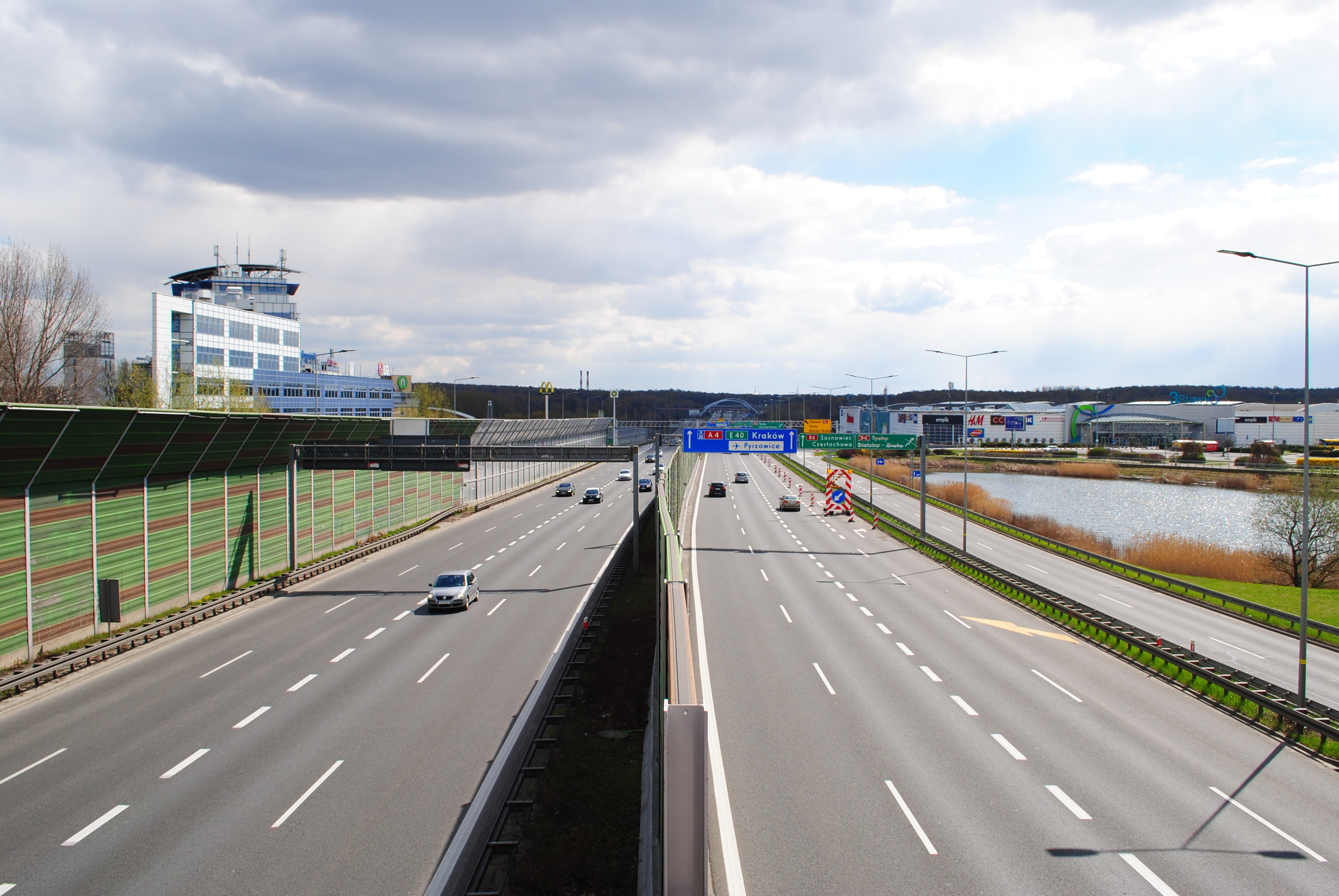
Fragment of the A4 motorway (Górnośląska Avenue) at the height of Osiedle Paderewskiego

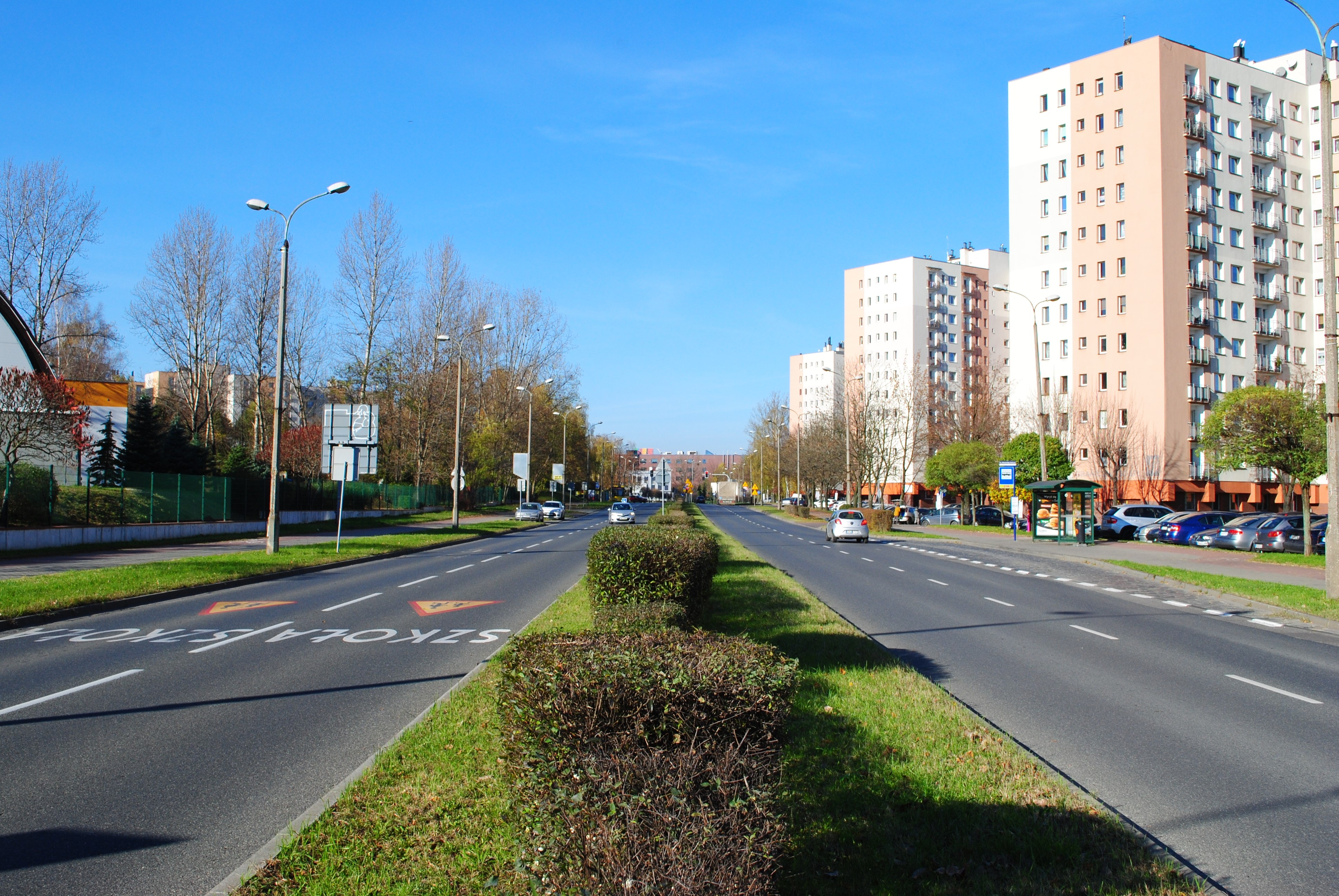
Graniczna Street at the height of Osiedle Paderewskiego

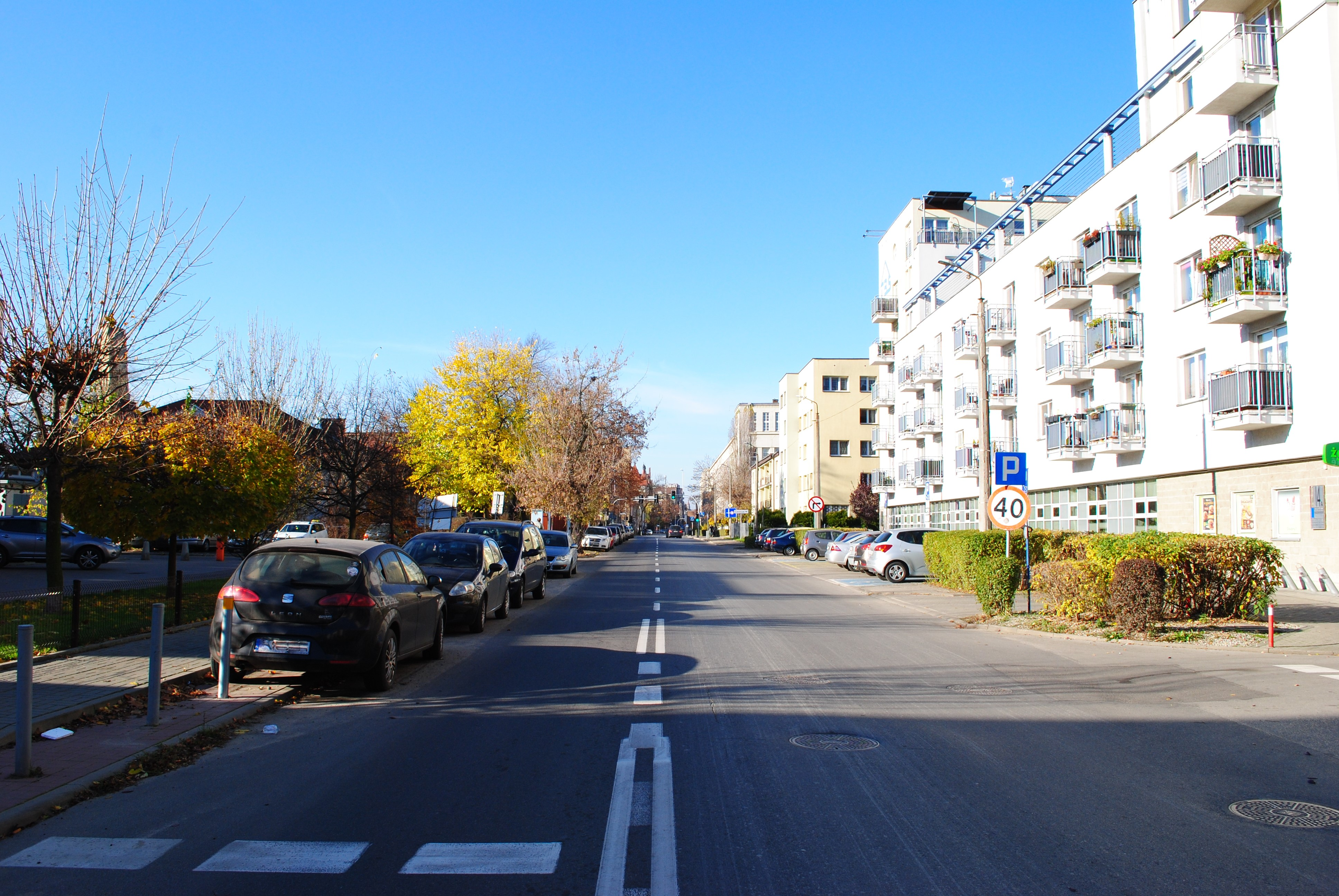
Zygmunt Krasiński Street at the height of the CZAH office building

The following national roads and expressways run through Osiedle Paderewskiego-Muchowiec:

- A4 (Górnośląska Avenue) – one of the most important roads in Katowice, part of the International E-road network E40. It runs parallel to the center of the district, and its primary function is to carry long-distance traffic, both interregional and international. To the west, it runs towards Wrocław and further to Germany, and to the east towards Kraków, Rzeszów, and further to Ukraine. The average traffic volume at the exit from Osiedle Paderewskiego-Muchowiec towards Mysłowice in September 2007 during the afternoon rush hour was 3,026 vehicles per hour;
- 81 (73 Pułku Piechoty Street) – runs along the southern border of the district with Piotrowice-Ochojec and Giszowiec. It is a collector road. It runs west towards Tadeusz Kościuszko Street and further towards Mikołów, Żory, and Skoczów;
- 86 (Murckowska Street and Pszczyńska Street) – runs along the eastern side of Osiedle Paderewskiego-Muchowiec, with Murckowska Street also forming the border between the district and Zawodzie and Janów-Nikiszowiec. These are freeways, which are part of the peri-urban road system connecting distant areas of the city with other districts or cities. Further along, this route has the parameters of an expressway. It connects the district with Expressway S1 and Tychy to the south, and with Sosnowiec, Będzin, and Katowice Airport to the north.

The most important streets within the district include the following roads:

- Konstanty Damrot Street – a county road of a local class. It runs meridionally through the western part of the district, forming part of the border with Śródmieście. connects the district with Śródmieście from the north and ends at the intersection with Francuska Street in the south, also located in Śródmieście;
- Francuska Street – a county road of collector class, connecting the eastern part of Śródmieście with Muchowiec. It is also a direct link between the city center and the A4 motorway, Katowice-Muchowiec Airfield, and the Katowice Forest Park. A section of the street located south of the junction with the A4 motorway runs through the district, while the rest is within the boundaries of Śródmieście. In September 2007, the average traffic volume on the street during the afternoon rush hour at the A4 motorway was 1,954 vehicles per hour;
- Graniczna Street – a county road of collector class. It runs through the central part of the district and connects Zawodzie and Śródmieście in the north with Osiedle Paderewskiego and the Valley of Three Ponds. In the central part of the street, at the intersection with J. Sowiński Street, there is the largest roundabout in the district – Kazimierz Zenkteller Roundabout, and next to it there is the Zofia Klimonda Square. The extension of Graniczna Street towards the east is K. Pułaski Street;
- Zygmunt Krasiński Street – a road in the northern part of the district running parallel to the equator, with a section located within the district boundaries to the east of the intersection with Graniczna Street. It is a county road of local class;
- Powstańców Street – a county road of collector class. A small eastern section of this road is located within the district (the section east of the intersection with K. Damrot Street). It connects Śródmieście with Osiedle Paderewskiego at Żołnierza Polskiego Square. At the intersection of Powstańców Street and K. Damrot Street, on the north-eastern side, there is the Council of Europe Square, and on the other side, there is Stanisław Maczek Square.

=== Rail transport ===
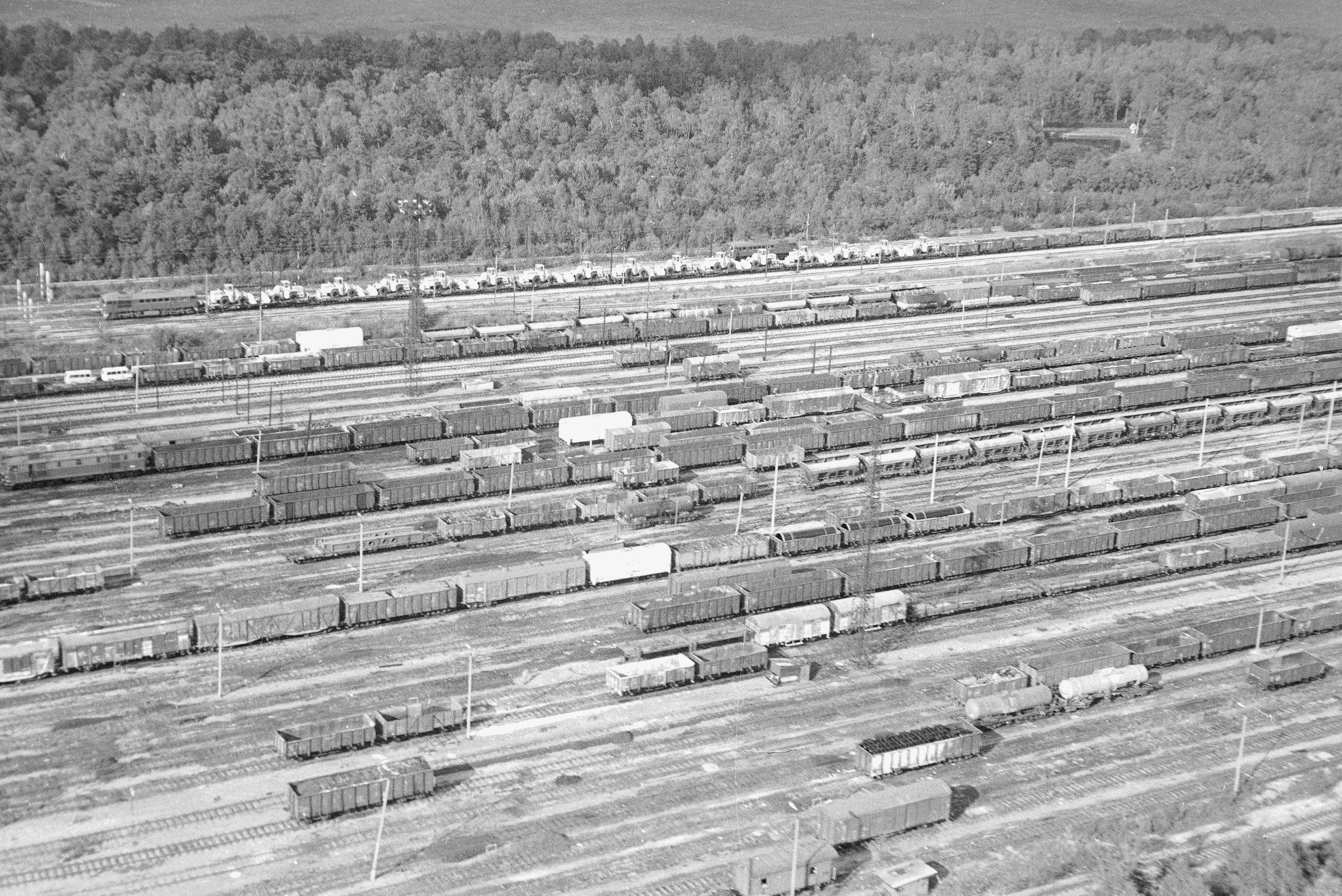
Former Katowice Muchowiec classification yard in the 1980s

The following railway lines run through Osiedle Paderewskiego-Muchowiec:

- Dąbrowa Górnicza Towarowa–Panewnik railway – a primary railway. At kilometre 37+633 is the former Katowice Muchowiec railway station. The section of the railway passing through Osiedle Paderewskiego-Muchowiec is open to freight traffic and runs on a single track;
- Katowice Muchowiec KMb–Staszic railway – a local railway of national importance. Freight traffic runs on the section passing through Osiedle Paderewskiego-Muchowiec;
- Katowice Muchowiec–Katowice Ochojec KOc railway – a local railway of national importance. It has been impassable since 2014;
- Mysłowice MwB–Katowice Muchowiec KMa railway – a local railway of national importance. It became impassable before 2021;
- Katowice Szopienice Północne–Katowice Muchowiec KMb railway – a local railway of national importance. Only freight traffic operates on the railway;
- Katowice Muchowiec KMB–Katowice Ochojec KOc1 railway – a local railway of national importance. It became impassable before 2018;
- Katowice Muchowiec KMB–Staszic railway – a local railway of national importance. It was closed before 2014.

The first railway in Osiedle Paderewskiego-Muchowiec, running parallel to the border with Giszowiec and 73 Pułku Piechoty Street, was the Right Bank Oder Railway. This railway, running through the district (Szopienice Północne–Murcki and further to Dziedzice) was opened on 24 June 1870. The railway was nationalized in 1884, and in the same year, passenger traffic was discontinued on the section passing through Osiedle Paderewskiego-Muchowiec. The section of the railway running within the boundaries of Osiedle Paderewskiego-Muchowiec is currently the Katowice Szopienice Północne–Katowice Muchowiec KMb railway. On 11 December 1930, traffic was inaugurated on the Katowice Muchowiec–Katowice Ochojec KOc railway connecting Katowice Muchowiec with Katowice Ochojec, and in the same year, south of the Katowice Szopienice Północne–Katowice Muchowiec KMb railway, the Katowice Muchowiec KMB–Staszic railway was opened. Both lines were electrified on 30 May 1970.

A map from 1942 shows a narrow-gauge railway running from the former Kunegunda zinc smelter in Zawodzie, which was probably used to transport smelter slag to spoil tips.

Parallel to the route of the former Right Bank Oder Railway, on 27 September 1953, an electrified freight railway connecting the Dorota station in Dąbrowa Górnicza with the Panewnik post via Janów and Muchowiec (Dąbrowa Górnicza Towarowa–Panewnik railway) was put into operation. This railway was electrified on 30 May 1970. It was created as a ring-route in relation to the Katowice–Gliwice cross-city railway, and in the years following its opening, a large classification yard, Katowice Muchowiec, was built in Muchowiec. In 1972, a carriage repair workshop with a repair hall and technical facilities was put into operation next to it.

In 1963, a section of the Mysłowice MwB–Katowice Muchowiec KMa railway on the Katowice Janów–Katowice Muchowiec route was opened for passenger and freight traffic (or as early as 1929, but only for freight traffic). In 1969, the railway was electrified (or on 30 May 1970), and a year later, passenger traffic was suspended. On 15 November 1968, a new Katowice Muchowiec KMB–Staszic railway was opened for freight traffic (or as early as 1930), and it was electrified in 1970 (or in 1966). In 1970 (or already on 11 December 1930), Katowice Muchowiec KMB–Katowice Ochojec KOc1 railway was put into service, which was electrified a year later (or on 30 May 1970). Freight trains operated on it.

A section of the Southern Sand Main Railway ran through the district, connecting the Jęzor Centralny railway station in the direction of the Wujek Coal Mine, with branches to the Staszic Coal Mine and the Wieczorek Coal Mine. It was railway No. 401, built between 1959 and 1961.

=== Air transport ===
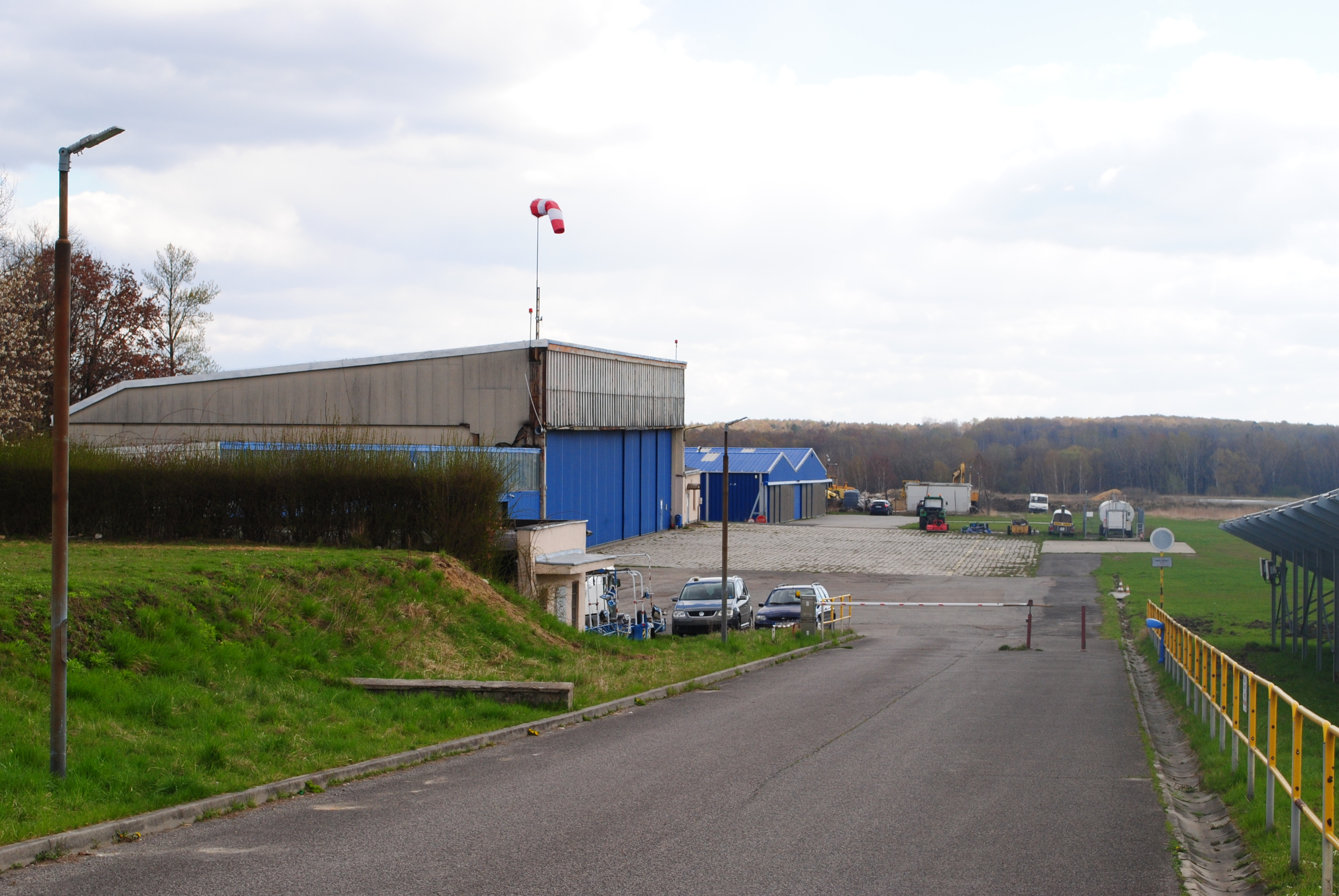
Fragment of Katowice-Muchowiec Airfield (eastern part)

Within the boundaries of Osiedle Paderewskiego-Muchowiec is the Katowice-Muchowiec Airfield, with the ICAO code EPKM. It is a civil airport serving sports aircraft and business traffic. It is equipped with a concrete runway measuring 1,100 × 30 m and two grass runways measuring 770 × 100 m and 655 × 65 m. They are used for general aviation operations. The airport is managed by the Silesian Aeroclub, which is also its main user. The airport is also the base for the Polish Medical Air Rescue.

The beginnings of aviation in Osiedle Paderewskiego-Muchowiec date back to the 1920s. In 1924, the Silesian Provisional Provincial Committee of the Air Defence League was established, transformed in 1928 into the Airborne and Antigas Defence League. On 30 March 1926, the Silesian district of LOPP concluded a 30-year lease agreement with the Katowice Joint Stock Company for Mining and Metallurgy, transferring 56 hectares of degraded and burnt forest land in Muchowiec for the construction of an airport. In the northern part, construction began on an airport terminal complex with hotel and residential rooms, as well as premises for a flight school, a wooden hangar, a workshop, and a fuel station. The radio beacon was located east of the airport, on the Mrówcza Górka hill.

The airport was opened on 2 January 1929. On that day, LOT organized the following routes: Warsaw–Katowice, Kraków–Katowice, and Katowice–Brno–Vienna. In its first year of operation, 5,256 passengers and 2,709 aircraft were handled. Between 1946 and 1947, a new runway made of concrete slabs was built. Due to mining damage, on 15 June 1958, the airport was closed to regular traffic, and since then it has been used only by sports and medical aircraft.

=== Bicycle transport ===
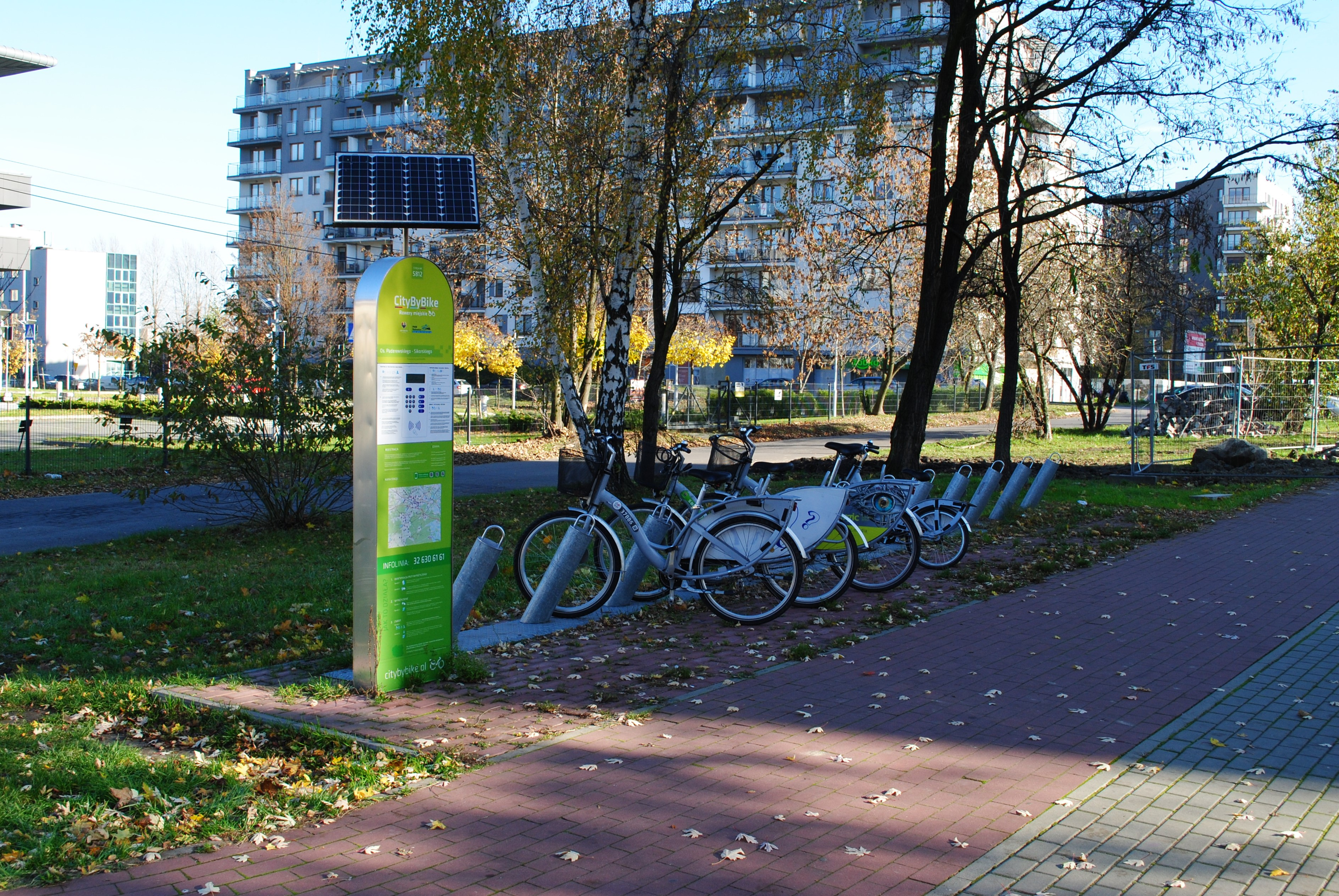
City by bike station No. 5813 Osiedle Paderewskiego-Szeptyckiego (2020)

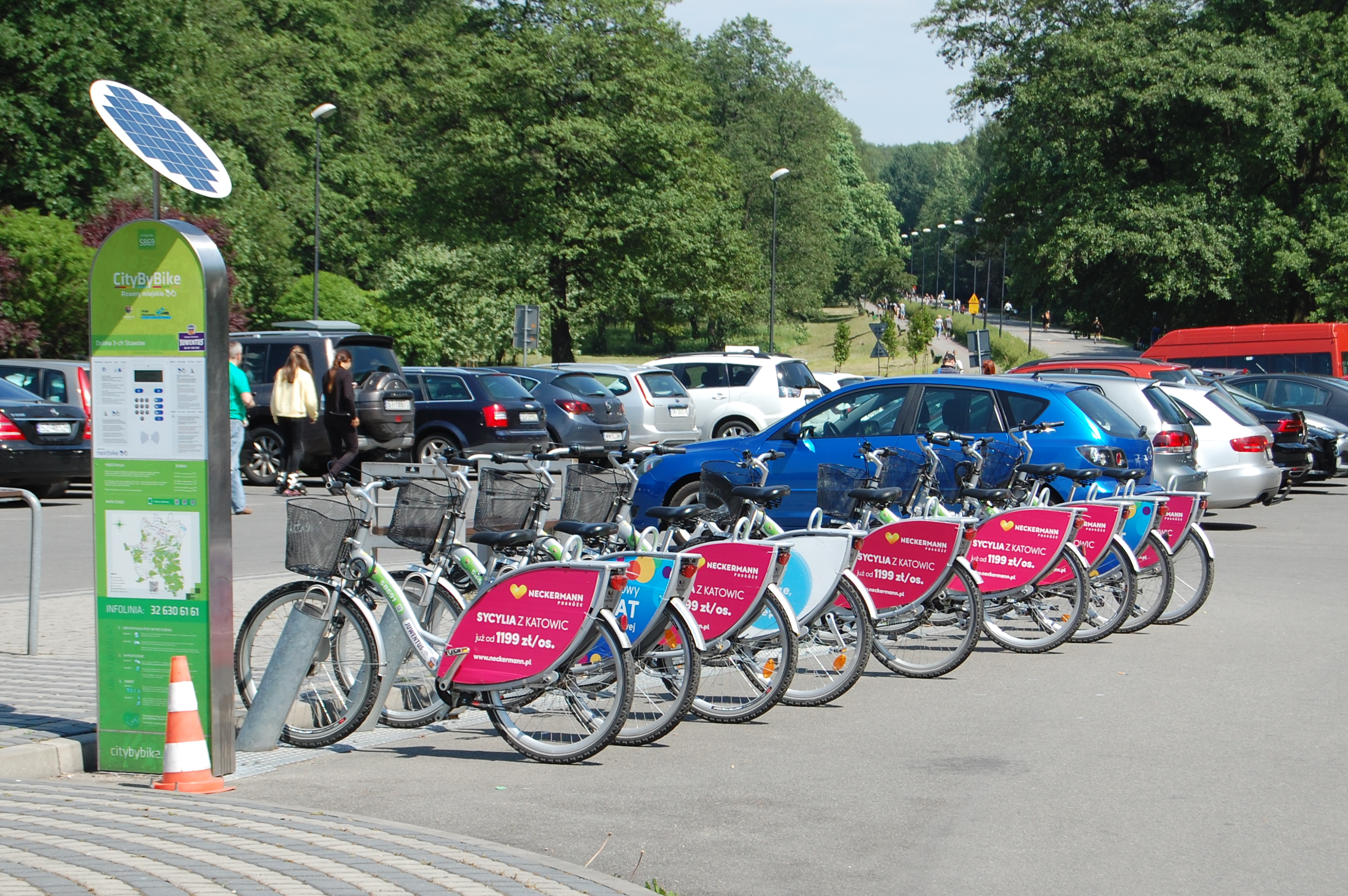
City by bike station No. 5869 Dolina 3-ch Stawów (Trzech Stawów Street) in 2017

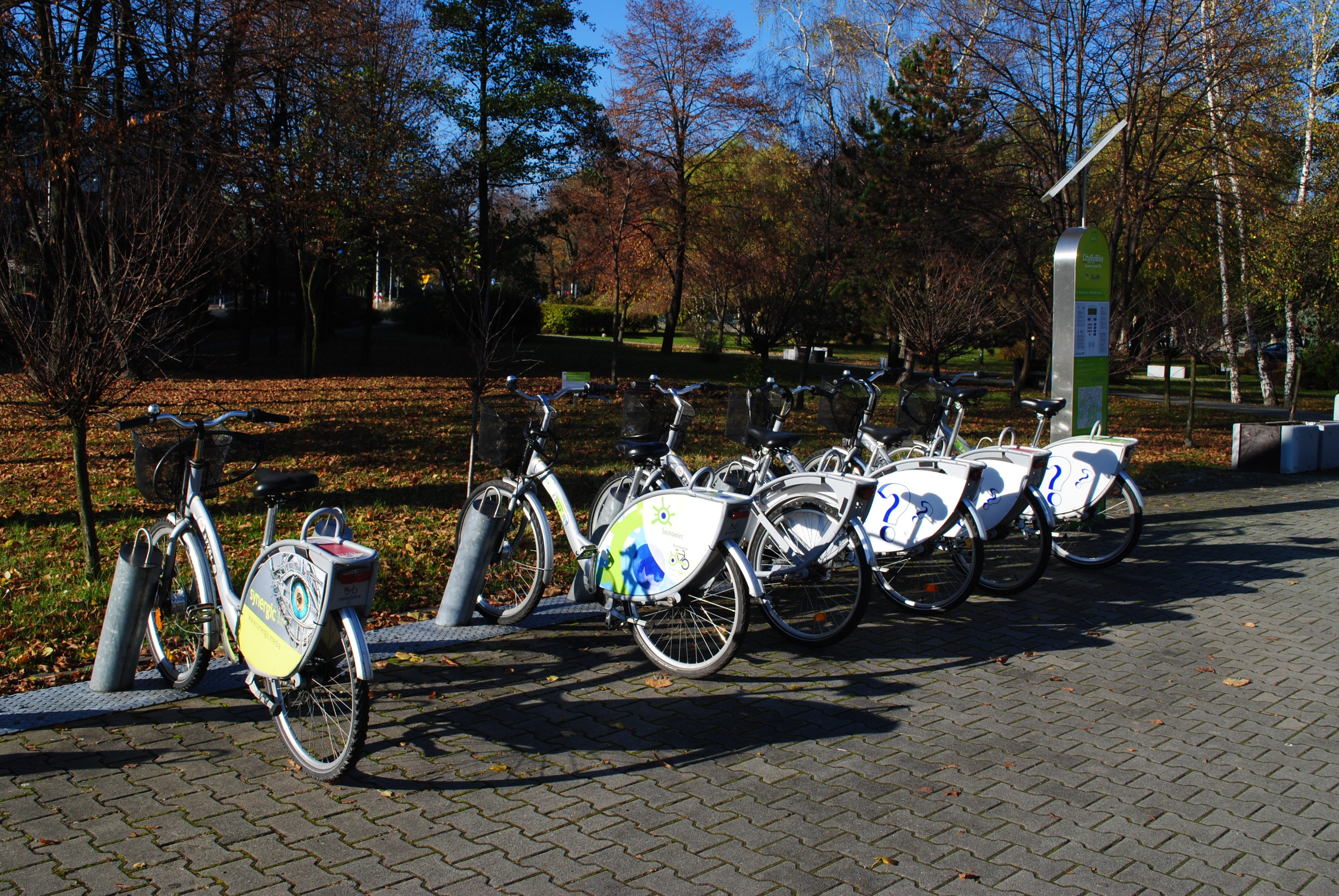
City by bike station No. 5875 Powstańców – Biblioteka Śląska (2020)

Osiedle Paderewskiego-Muchowiec district has an extensive network of cycling infrastructure. There are various types of cycle paths there, including:

- cycle paths – a path along the streets: K. Damrot–Powstańców–Graniczna–K. Pułaski–Lotnisko (of which the section between K. Damrot Street and Graniczna Street is paved with cobblestones), individual paths along S. Szeptycki Street (cobblestones) and K. Pułaski Street (cobblestones), and a route between Graniczna Street and Gospodarcza Street;
- bike lanes – along Trzech Stawów Street between the intersection with Gospodarcza Street and the A4 motorway (asphalt road);
- pedestrian and bicycle paths – along Trzech Stawów Street between the A4 motorway and the 304 Dywizjonu Bombowego Ziemi Śląskiej Square and south of A. Zgrzebniok Street (both asphalt);
- contraflow lanes – a short section of Trzech Stawów Street at the 304 Dywizjonu Bombowego Ziemi Śląskiej Square;
- routes with permitted traffic on the sidewalk – routes in the Valley of Three Ponds and in the western part of the Katowice Forest Park.

The only bicycle repair station in the district is located at the 3 Stawy shopping center.

According to the target bicycle path network published by the Katowice City Hall, further expansion of the network is planned. Bicycle routes with a transport function in Osiedle Paderewskiego-Muchowiec have been designated along the following streets: K. Damrot, Powstańców, Graniczna (including a branch towards the Valley of Three Ponds), K. Pułaski, Lotnisko and Francuska (northern part), as well as a road parallel to Murckowska Street, a route towards Gospodarcza Street, and a branch from Giszowiec to Katowice Forest Park. Recreational functions are planned for the roads surrounding the Valley of Three Ponds from the west, in the area of the Katowice Forest Park and the route along the southern part of Francuska Street.

As part of the "Cycling in Silesia" project, bicycle routes have been designated within the city, with the following routes intersecting in Osiedle Paderewskiego-Muchowiec:

- red bicycle trail no. 1: Śródmieście (Silesian Insurgents Memorial) – Osiedle Paderewskiego-Muchowiec (Murckowska Street – Trzech Stawów Street) – Piotrowice-Ochojec – Kostuchna – Podlesie (Zaopusta Street);
- yellow bicycle route no. 5: Szopienice-Burowiec (Borki pond) – Janów-Nikiszowiec – Zawodzie – Osiedle Paderewskiego-Muchowiec (Valley of Three Ponds).

Osiedle Paderewskiego-Muchowiec also has part of the city's bicycle rental network – Metrorower, which replaced the City by bike system. It was the largest system of its kind in Metropolis GZM, being one of the nextbike systems. As of mid-April 2022, the following City by bike stations were located in the district:

- 5812 Os. Paderewskiego – Sikorskiego (12 stands),
- 5813 Os. Paderewskiego – Szeptyckiego (12 stands),
- 5814 Graniczna – Targowisko (12 stands),
- 5869 Dolina 3-ch Stawów (13 stands),
- 5875 Powstańców – Biblioteka Śląska (12 stands),
- 5883 KTBS – Krasińskiego 14 (12 stands),
- 5897 Galeria 3 Stawy (12 stands),
- 5911 Camping 215 (12 stands),
- 6151 Urząd Miasta – Francuska 70 (13 stands),
- 6166 Pułaskiego – Wodny Plac Zabaw (13 stands).

=== Public transport ===
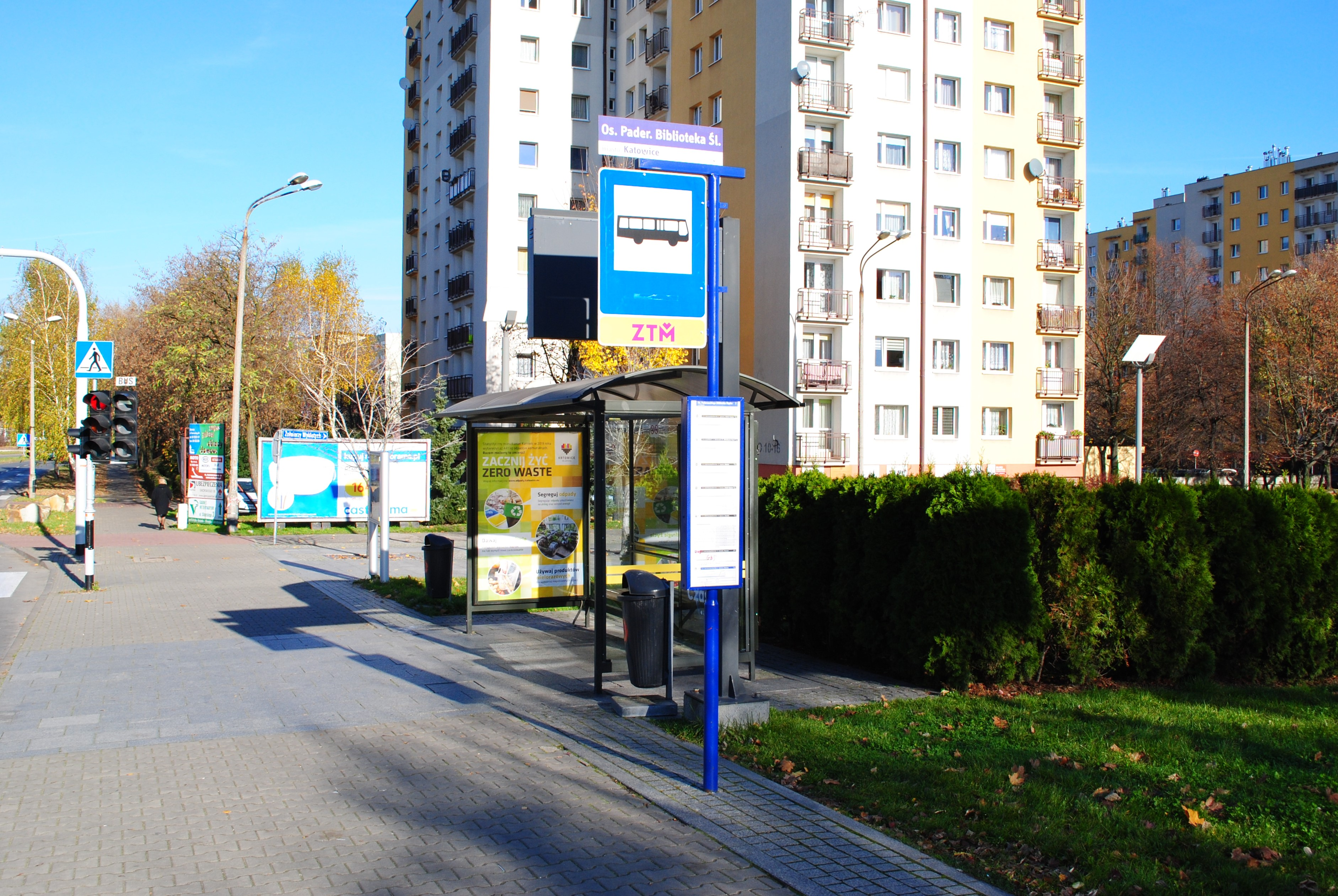
Osiedle Paderewskiego Biblioteka Śląska bus stop

The organizer of public transport in Osiedle Paderewskiego-Muchowiec is the Metropolitan Transport Authority, which took over the responsibilities from the previous organizers on 1 January 2019. Public transport within the district is provided only in the form of bus connections. As of mid-April 2022, there are a total of four bus stops in Osiedle Paderewskiego: Osiedle Paderewskiego Biblioteka Śląska, Osiedle Paderewskiego Graniczna, Osiedle Paderewskiego Pomnik, and Osiedle Paderewskiego Trzy Stawy. In Muchowiec, there are also 4 stops: Muchowiec 73 Pułku Piechoty [nż] (northern stop), Muchowiec Droga do Lotniska, Muchowiec Korty Pętla, and Muchowiec Park. Other parts of the district have the following stops: Katowice Damrota GTC, Katowice Francuska WORD, Katowice Green Park, Katowice Krasińskiego, Katowice Porcelanowa (western stop), and Kolonia Zuzanna [nż]. The main carriers on the lines running through Osiedle Paderewskiego-Muchowiec are: Municipal Transport Company in Katowice and Municipal Transport Company in Tychy.

As of mid-April 2022, six bus lines, including one night line, departed from platform 1 at the Osiedle Paderewskiego Biblioteka Śląska stop, and a total of ten lines, including two night lines, departed from platform 2. These lines connected this part of the city with other districts of Katowice, as well as the cities of Mysłowice, Siemianowice Śląskie, and Tychy. One bus line runs to the Muchowiec Korty Pętla stop, heading towards Siemianowice Śląskie through the Katowice districts of Śródmieście, Dąb, and Wełnowiec-Józefowiec. In mid-April 2022, a total of seven bus lines running towards Mysłowice and Tychy used the Kolonia Zuzanna [nż] stop.

== Architecture and urban planning ==
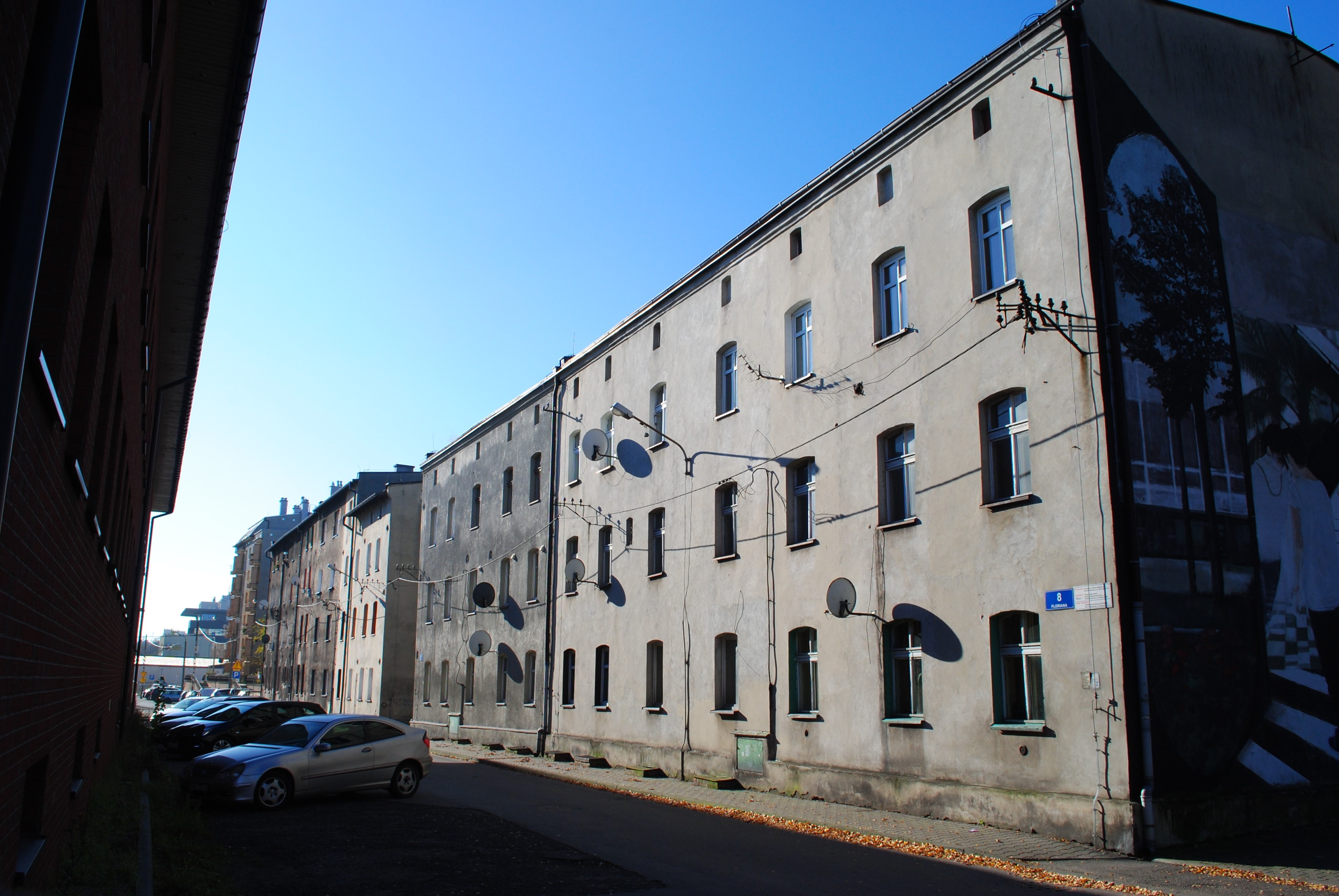
Oldest buildings in Osiedle Paderewskiego-Muchowiec – familoks at 8 and 10 Floriana Street (on the right side); from the 1890s

The oldest buildings in Osiedle Paderewskiego-Muchowiec district are located in its northern part, on the border with Zawodzie. The oldest buildings include the familoks located at 8–10 Floriana Street, which date back to the 1890s, as well as the buildings at 12, 14, and 16 Floriana Street and the tenement at 10 Równoległa Street from the turn of the 19th and 20th centuries. The buildings at 10 and 12 I.J. Paderewski Street date back to 1902, while in the first decade of the 20th century, buildings were also constructed opposite the street, at 7, 9, 11, 13, 15, and 17 I.J. Paderewski Street. In 1913, a detached house at 22 K. Damrot Street was put into use. This building is the seat of the Konior Studio architectural studio founded by Tomasz Konior. Only a few buildings in the district date back to the interwar period. In the 1920s, a complex of familoks was built at 2, 3, 4, 5, and 6 Równoległa Street. Between 1927 and 1929, the building of the former Katowice-Muchowiec Airfield terminal was constructed at 40 Lotnisko Street, while in the 1930s, buildings at 27b Z. Krasiński Street and 9 Równoległa Street were put into use.

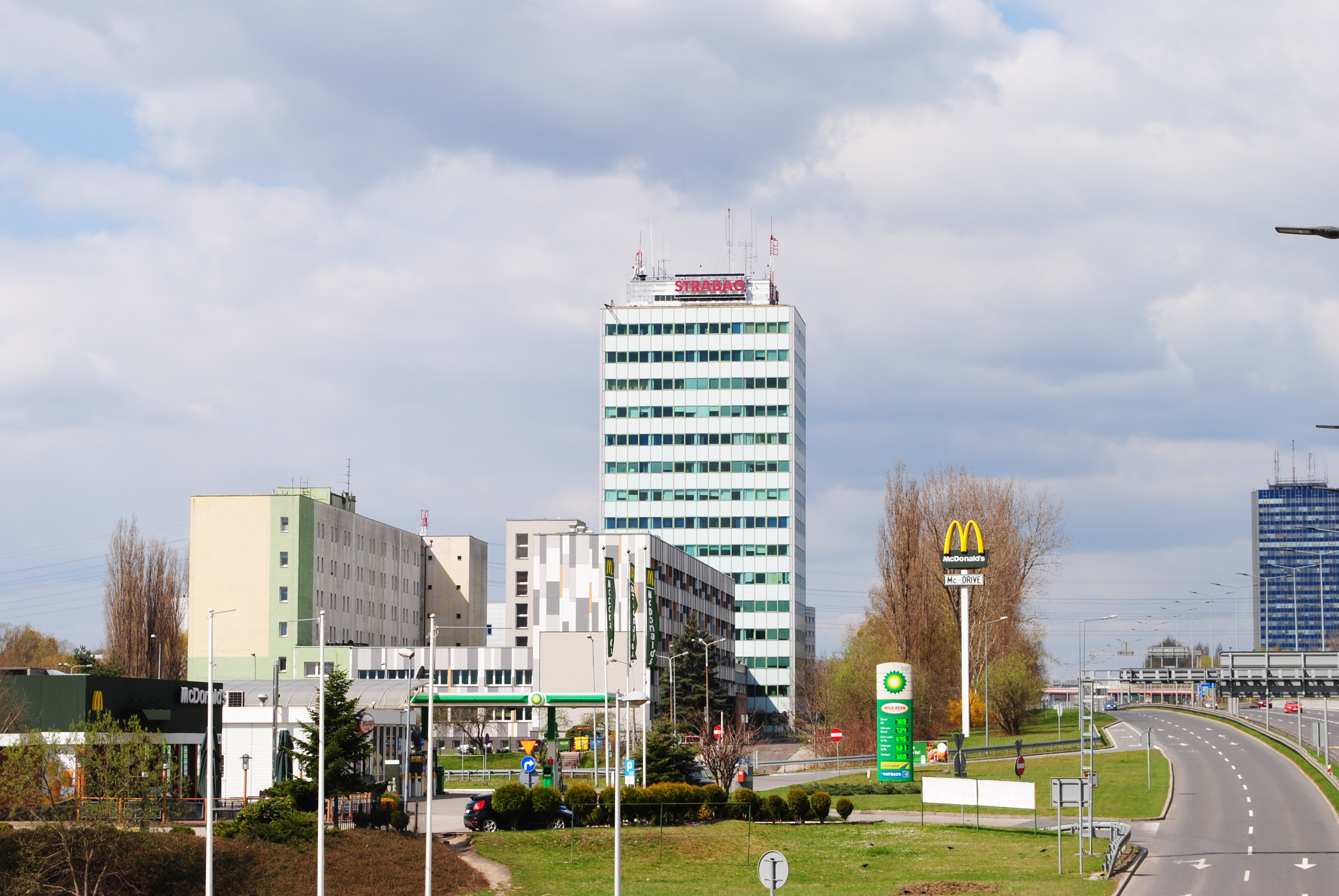
Skyscraper of the former Coal Construction Company from 1965 (70 Francuska Street)

During the post-war development phase of Katowice, which lasted from 1945 to the end of the 1980s, one of the city's largest housing estates was built in the Osiedle Paderewskiego-Muchowiec district – Osiedle Paderewskiego. The road network was also expanded, including the reconstruction of Górnośląska Avenue and Murckowska Street, as well as the railway network – a freight railway bypass was built during this period, along with the Katowice Muchowiec railway station. In the first decades of Polska Ludowa, until the early 1970s, the architectural development of the district continued to focus on the northern part. New buildings were then constructed mainly in the area of Z. Krasiński and H. Krahelska streets. The first single-family houses in the area of Pilotów and Karbowa streets were also built at that time. In 1965, on the site of the former Schalsch brickworks, at 70 Francuska Street, a skyscraper belonging to the Coal Construction Company was put into use, which is now the seat of, among others, some departments of the Katowice City Hall. The Francuska 70 skyscraper is approximately 70 meters high and was modernized in 2010. The Bipromet office complex, located at 29 Graniczna Street, dates back to the 1970s. The total usable area of the complex is 14,345 m².

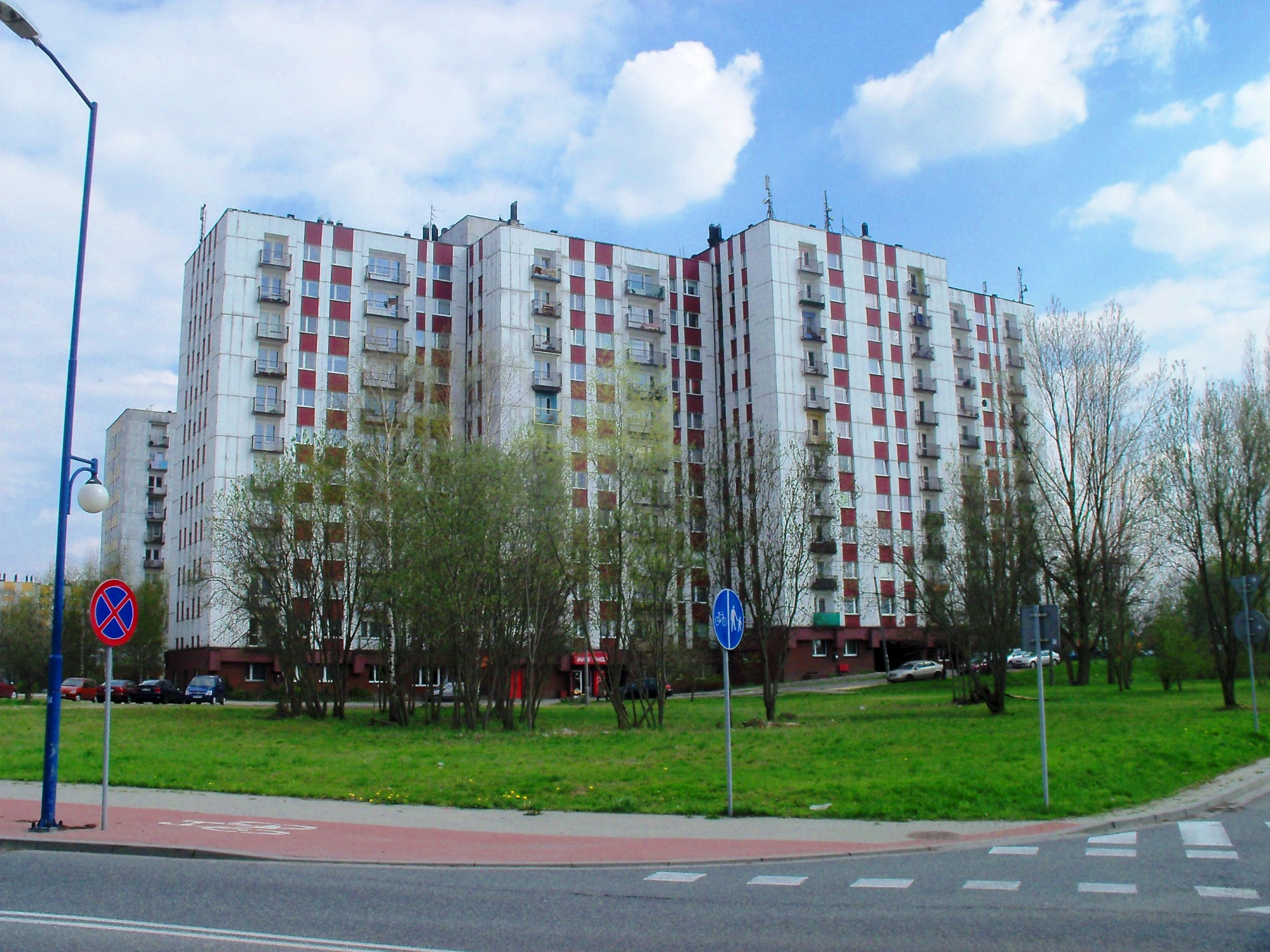
Fragment of Osiedle Paderewskiego in 2011 (view from K. Damrot Street)

Osiedle Paderewskiego dates back to the 1970s. It consists of 22 residential buildings, each with 11 floors. These are point-and-gallery and terraced buildings made using large-panel-system technology. The housing estate is complemented by two-story service and commercial pavilions, a medical clinic, schools, and kindergartens. It was designed for 20,000 residents. The housing estate was designed by a team of architects from Katowice-based Miastoprojekt: Jurand Jarecki, Stanisław Kwaśniewicz, and Ryszard Ćwikliński.

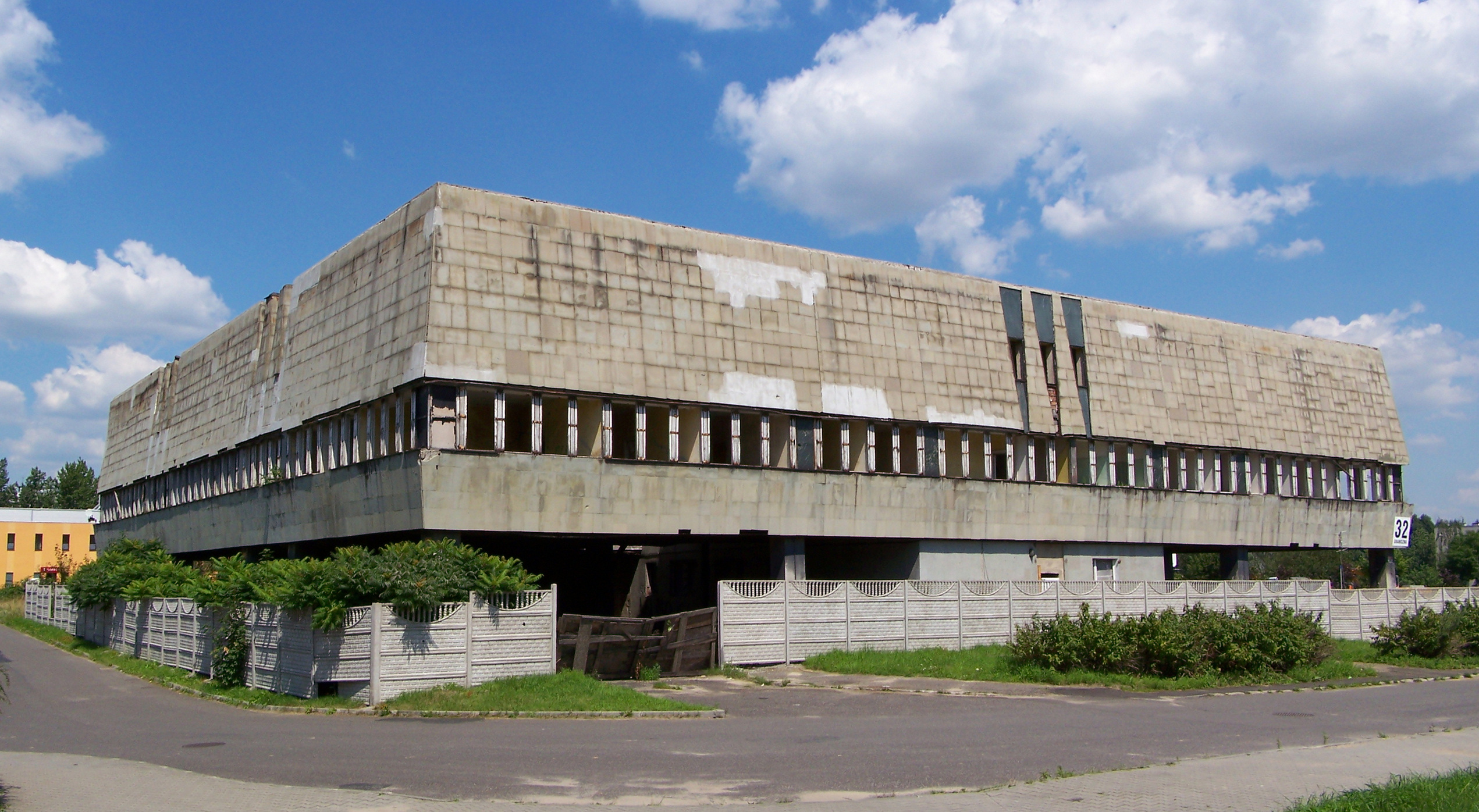
Headquarters of the Silesian Scientific Institute built in the brutalist style (32 Graniczna Street; photograph from 2008)

In 1977, the building at 32 Graniczna Street, the seat of the Silesian Scientific Institute, was put into use. The building was designed by Stanisław Kwaśniewicz in the brutalist style. It was referred to in the press as the last brutalist building in Katowice. After the institute ceased operations at the end of 1992, the building was abandoned and fell into ruin. In 2022, it was demolished.

The current phase of urban development in Katowice, including Osiedle Paderewskiego-Muchowiec, has been ongoing since the early 1990s. This phase is characterized by the construction of new road connections (in this district, it is the A4 motorway), the liquidation of a significant part of industrial railways and sidings, new service and commercial investments (including the 3 Stawy shopping center), the development of a network of hotels, and the construction of small residential developments. Large shopping centers located along the main access routes to the city, including 3 Stawy in Osiedle Paderewskiego-Muchowiec, have become a feature of the district's urban space. Muchowiec itself remained a sparsely urbanized area with scattered buildings.

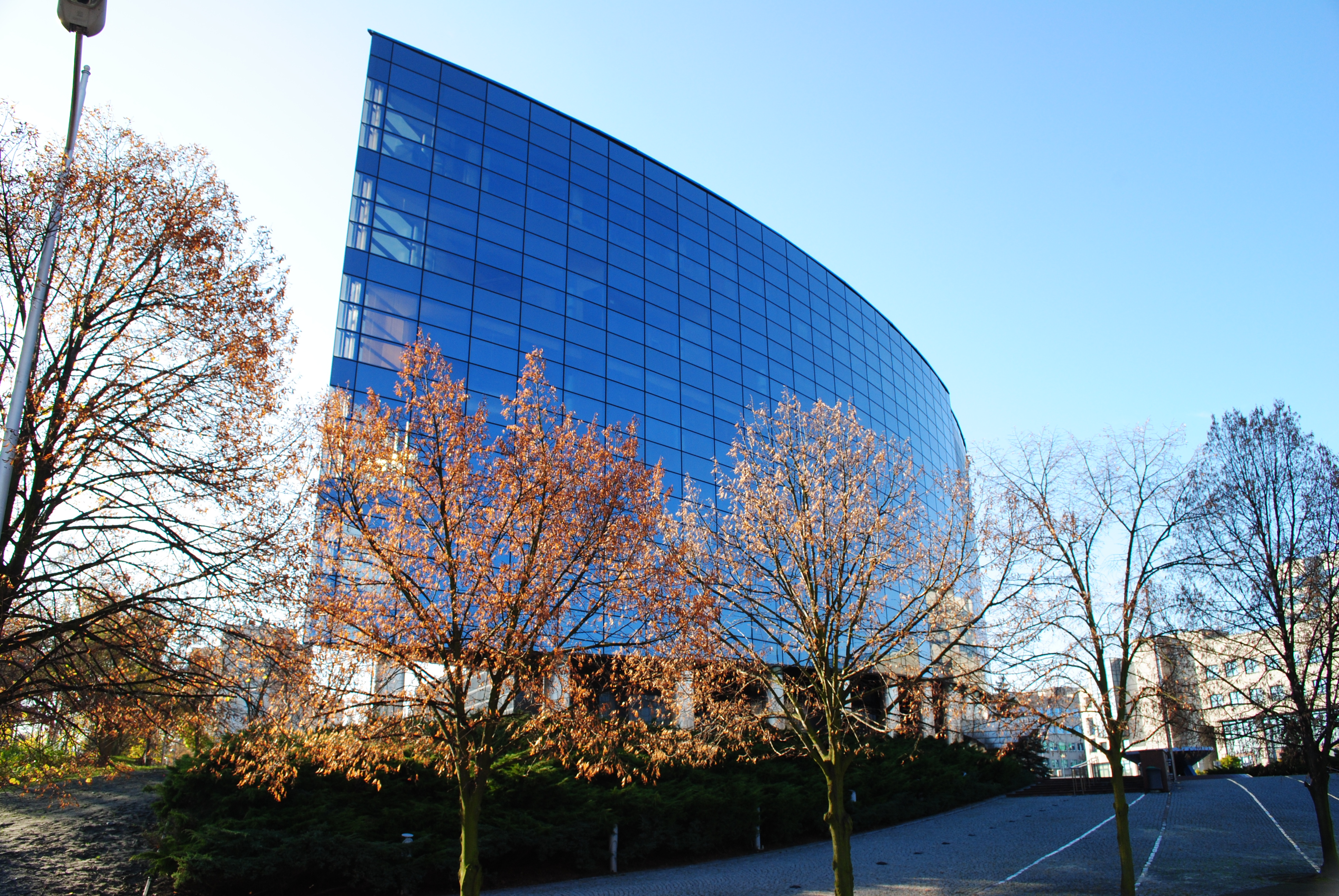
Headquarters of the former BRE Bank Katowice branch (now mBank) from between 1991 and 1999

The Council of Europe Square, which took its present form in the 1990s, complements the urban development of Katowice that has been ongoing since the mid-19th century. The urban composition of the square is formed by the buildings of two banks: the Katowice branch of the former Export Development Bank (now mBank), with a representative inner courtyard and a rounded façade, built between 1991 and 1999 (designers: Jan Lelątko, Piotr Pawłowski, Janusz Czarnecki, Antoni Pietras, and Zdzisław Stanik) and the PKO Bank Polski, put into use in 1990, based on a series of perpendicular cubes designed by Aleksander Czora and Wojciech Podlewski. The compositional closure of the square is the Silesian Library building, constructed between 1990 and 1997, designed by Jurand Jarecki, Stanisław Kwaśniewicz, and Marek Gierlotka. The building was constructed on a rectangular plan, similar to a square, with an internal skylight. The building is an example of a successful combination of International Style with neomodernist tendency, which sought to combat the monotony of the façade and visualize the symbolic content associated with the place.

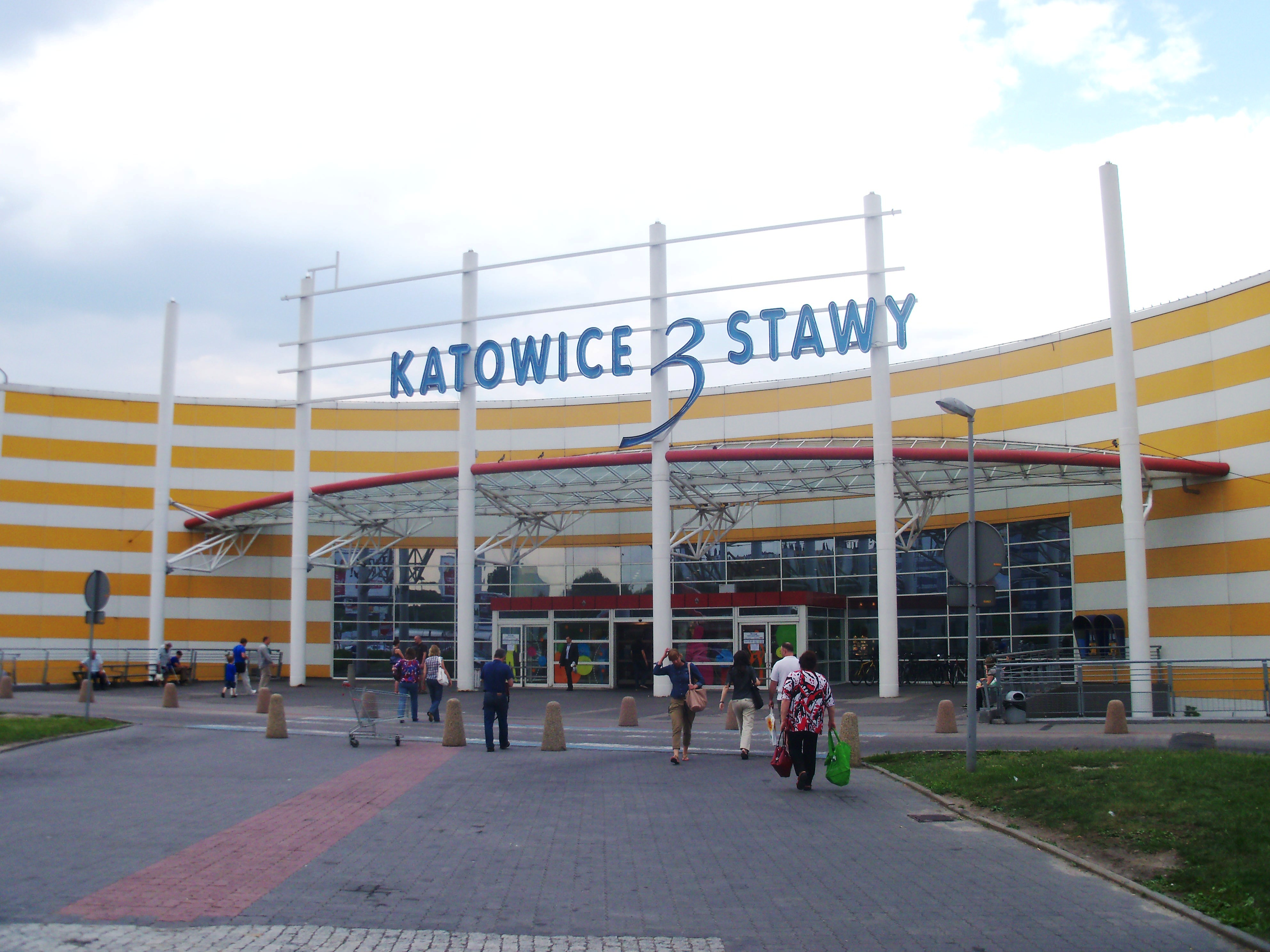
3 Stawy shopping center in 2011 (before modernization)

The 3 Stawy shopping center, located at 60 K. Pułaski Street, was opened in November 1999. The design of the mall was created by a team of architects from the Kraków-based IMB Asymetria studio. In 2014, the shopping center was rebuilt, including new entrances. Between 2000 and 2001, the Millennium Plaza Katowice office building was constructed at 46 J.L. Sowiński Street. The architectural design of this building was developed by the Katowice-based architectural studio Czora i Czora. The total usable area of the building is 10,900 m². In 2004, the former Telekomunikacja Polska building at 101 Francuska Street was put into use. Between 2007 and 2008, the 14-story Silesian Hotel building was constructed at 1a Szybowcowa Street, while in 2009, the construction of the Atrium office building at 54 Graniczna Street was completed. Between 2011 and 2013, a five-story office building of Polski Koks was built at 41 I.J. Paderewski Street. It is the headquarters of JSW Innowacje.

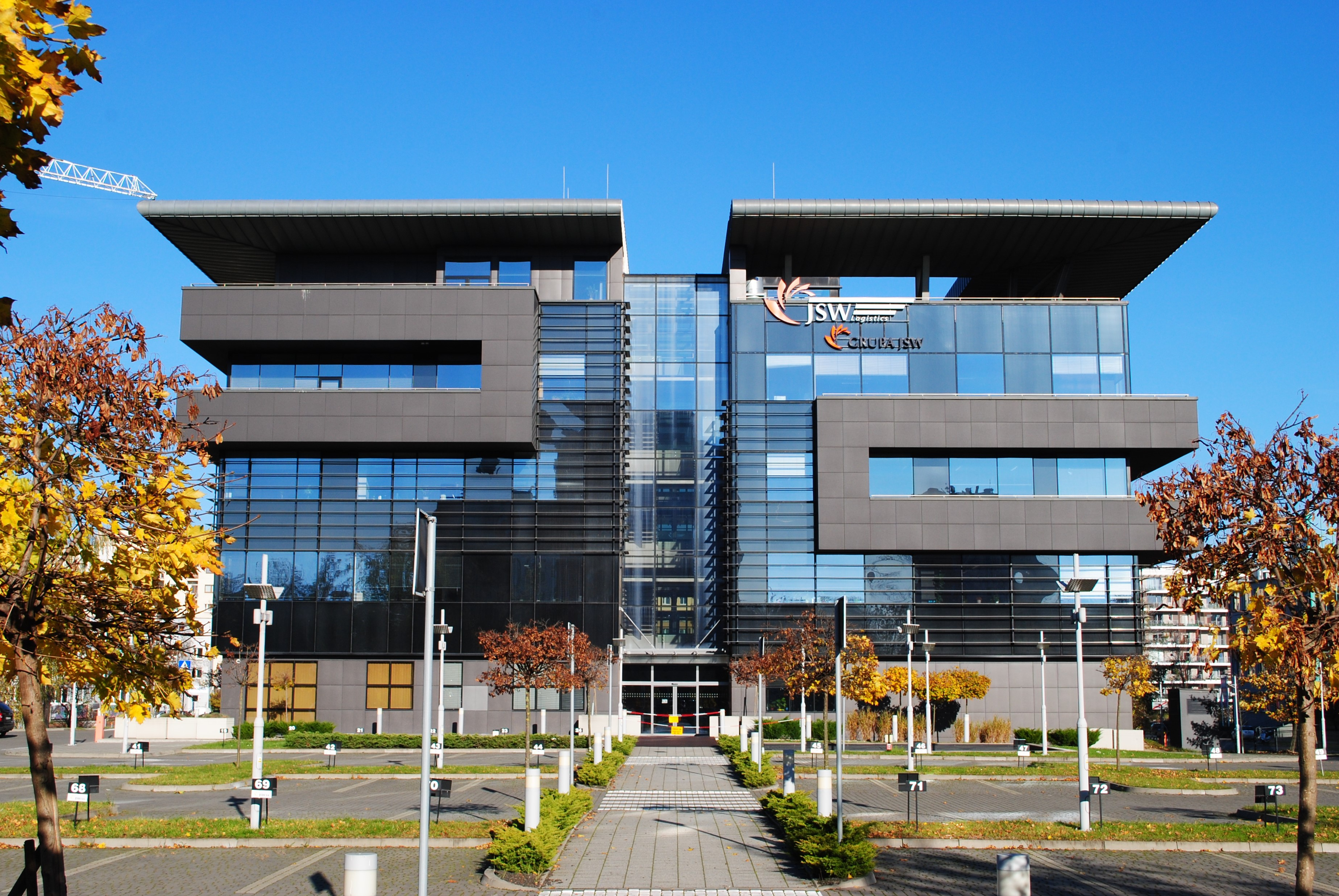
Polski Koks office building from between 2011 and 2013 (41 I.J. Paderewski Street)

Osiedle Francuska Park was built in the area of Francuska Street in Muchowiec. Since May 2013, the investor of the estate has been the Cieszyn-based company ATAL, while the architect Wojciech Wojciechowski is responsible for the design of the estate. In the first stage, up to twelve 5–10-story buildings were designed in a cascading layout, with a total of 880 apartments. Construction of the complex began in June 2013, and a total of five stages of the housing estate are planned.

In May 2014, the new headquarters of the Katowice branch of the Social Insurance Institution was opened at 2 J.L. Sowiński Street. On the border between Śródmieście and Osiedle Paderewskiego-Muchowiec, at 42 Francuska Street, the construction of the A4 Business Park office complex lasted from November 2012 to August 2016. The investor of the complex was Echo Investment from Kielce. In Muchowiec, at Francuska Street, a complex of three two-story buildings, Muchowiec Active Park, was built between 2015 and 2018. It houses service and catering establishments, a wellness center, and office space. The building was designed by architects from the Katowice-based Archistudio Tomasz Studniarek and Małgorzata Pilinkiewicz. In 2020, construction began on the BaseCamp student housing complex on I.J. Paderewski Street, with a total area of 34,000 m². It was completed in September 2021. The building was designed by the Emkaa Architekci studio.

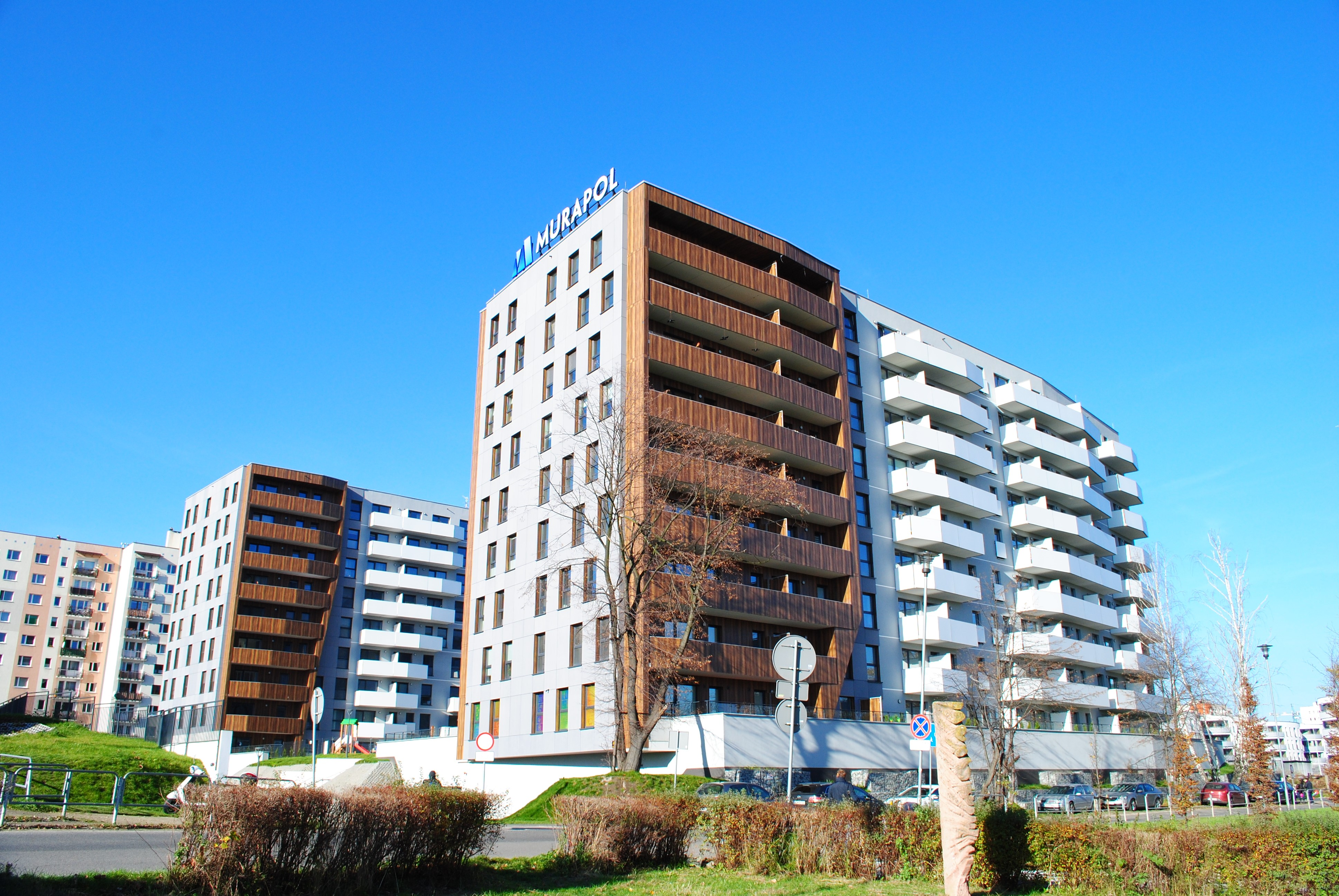
Murapol Apartamenty Trzy Stawy complex

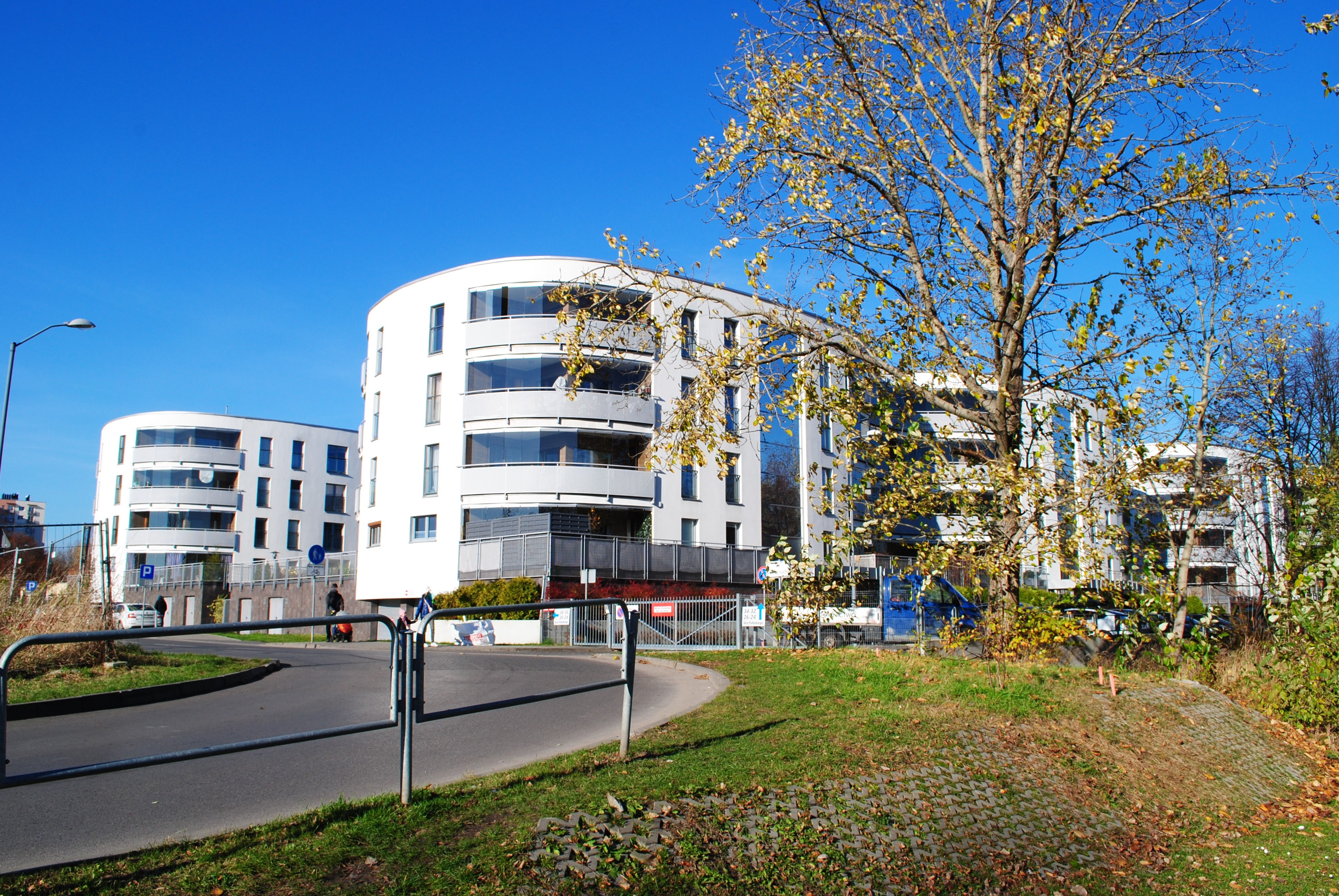
Osiedle Mały Staw (K. Pułaski Street; view from the south-east)

The development of new residential construction in Osiedle Paderewskiego-Muchowiec is mainly concentrated in the area of the Valley of Three Ponds. At the turn of the 20th and 21st centuries, several housing developments were built there, including:

- Cyprysowe Osiedle – a complex of residential buildings from between 2010 and 2013, built along I.J. Paderewski Street. It consists of four five-story buildings with a total of 74 apartments;
- Dom w Dolinie Trzech Stawów – a housing estate in the area of K. Pułaski Street and W. Sikorski Street, consisting of three buildings with luxury apartments and commercial premises. The investor was OKAM Capital. The architectural design was created by architects from the Konior Studio. The ceremonial laying of the cornerstone took place on 10 July 2012, and the estate was built in stages between 2012 and 2019;
- Murapol Apartamenty Trzy Stawy – a complex of two nine-story multi-family buildings located on K. Pułaski Street. Construction began in January 2018, and it was completed in June 2020. The investor was Murapol from Bielsko-Biała;
- Osiedle Park Przy Stawach – an estate in the area of K. Pułaski Street, consisting of six buildings with an underground garage. The architectural design was created by designers from Forma Kuberski studio;
- Osiedle Mały Staw – a low-rise multi-family estate built in the area of K. Pułaski Street and Graniczna Street. The investor was the Katowice Housing Cooperative. The estate consists of four four-story multi-family houses with a total of 128 apartments. The complex was built between 2011 and 2013;
- Osiedle Przystań – a low-rise multi-family estate built in the area of K. Pułaski Street and I.J. Paderewski Street. It consists of seven multi-family buildings, and the investor was the I.J. Paderewski Housing Cooperative;
- A complex of multi-family high-rise residential buildings in the area of A. Skowroński Street and Z. Krasiński Street, built by the Katowice Social Housing Association.

=== Historical and monumental sites ===
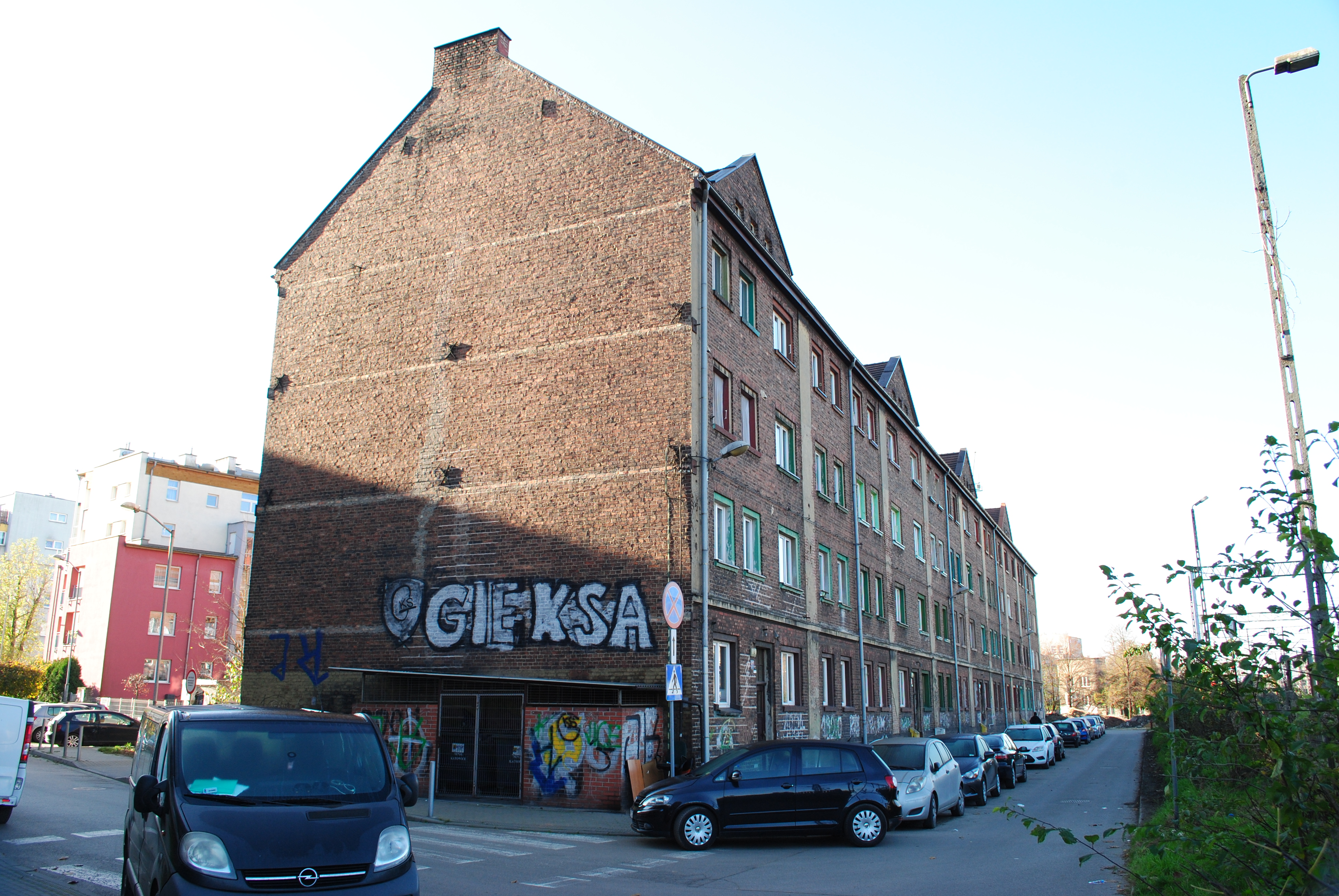
Complex of familoks at 2, 3, 4, 5 and 6 Równoległa Street, protected by conservation authorities and included in the municipal register of monuments

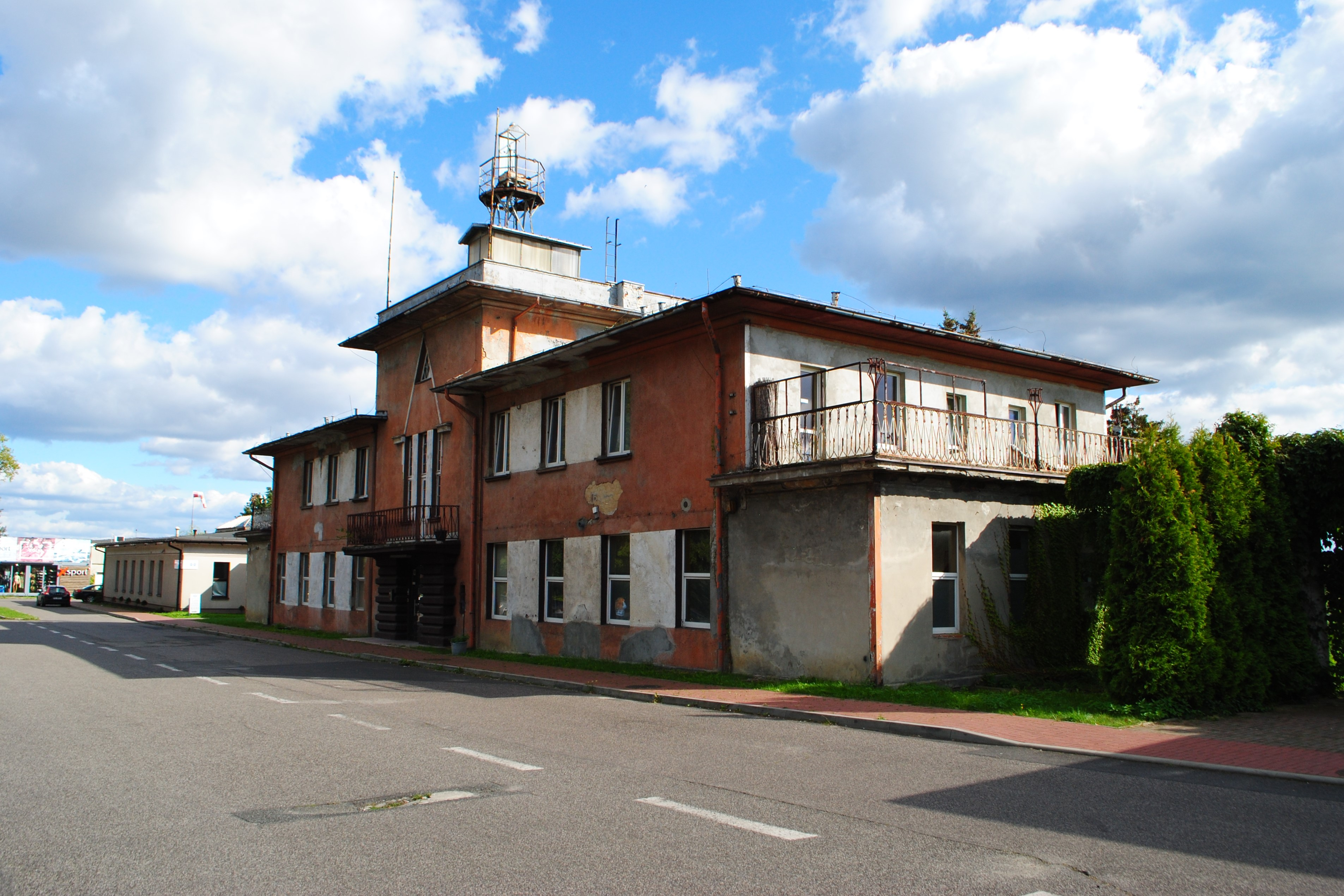
Complex of the Katowice-Muchowiec Airfield terminal from between 1927 and 1929 (40 Lotnisko Street; view from the north-west)

The following buildings are located in Osiedle Paderewskiego-Muchowiec and are protected under local zoning plans or proposed for protection under the study of conditions and directions of zoning of Katowice:

- 1 Council of Europe Square – drop hammer in front of the Silesian Library building;
- 22 K. Damrot Street – detached house;
- 10, 12, 14 and 16 Floriana Street – residential buildings (familoks) from the early 20th century;
- 1 and 3 H. Krahelska Street – residential buildings;
- 40 Lotnisko Street – complex of the airport terminal from between 1927 and 1929 in the neoclassical style, designed by Tadeusz Michejda. It is also the only building in the district listed in the Registry of Cultural Property (registration No. A/439/15 of 17 February 2015);
- 21 Z. Krasiński Street – church and convent of the Sisters of Mary Immaculate;
- 7, 9, 11, 13, 15 and 17 I.J. Paderewski Street – complex of tenements (familoks) with outbuildings in the frontage;
- 2, 3, 4, 5 and 6 Równoległa Street – complex of familoks;
- 2b Równoległa Street – villa with a garden;
- 9 Równoległa Street – detached tenement;
- 10 Równoległa Street – tenement with outbuildings.

Some of the above-mentioned buildings are additionally protected by conservation regulations based on the provisions of the local zoning plan. The following conservation zones or areas proposed for protection are located within Osiedle Paderewskiego-Muchowiec:

- Katowice-Muchowiec Airfield terminal from between 1927 and 1929 and its surroundings (area under conservation protection);
- Site of the former Evangelical cemetery, currently a green area;
- Complex of familoks at 2, 3, 4, 5 and 6 Równoległa Street (area under conservation protection).

=== Monuments and commemorative plaques ===
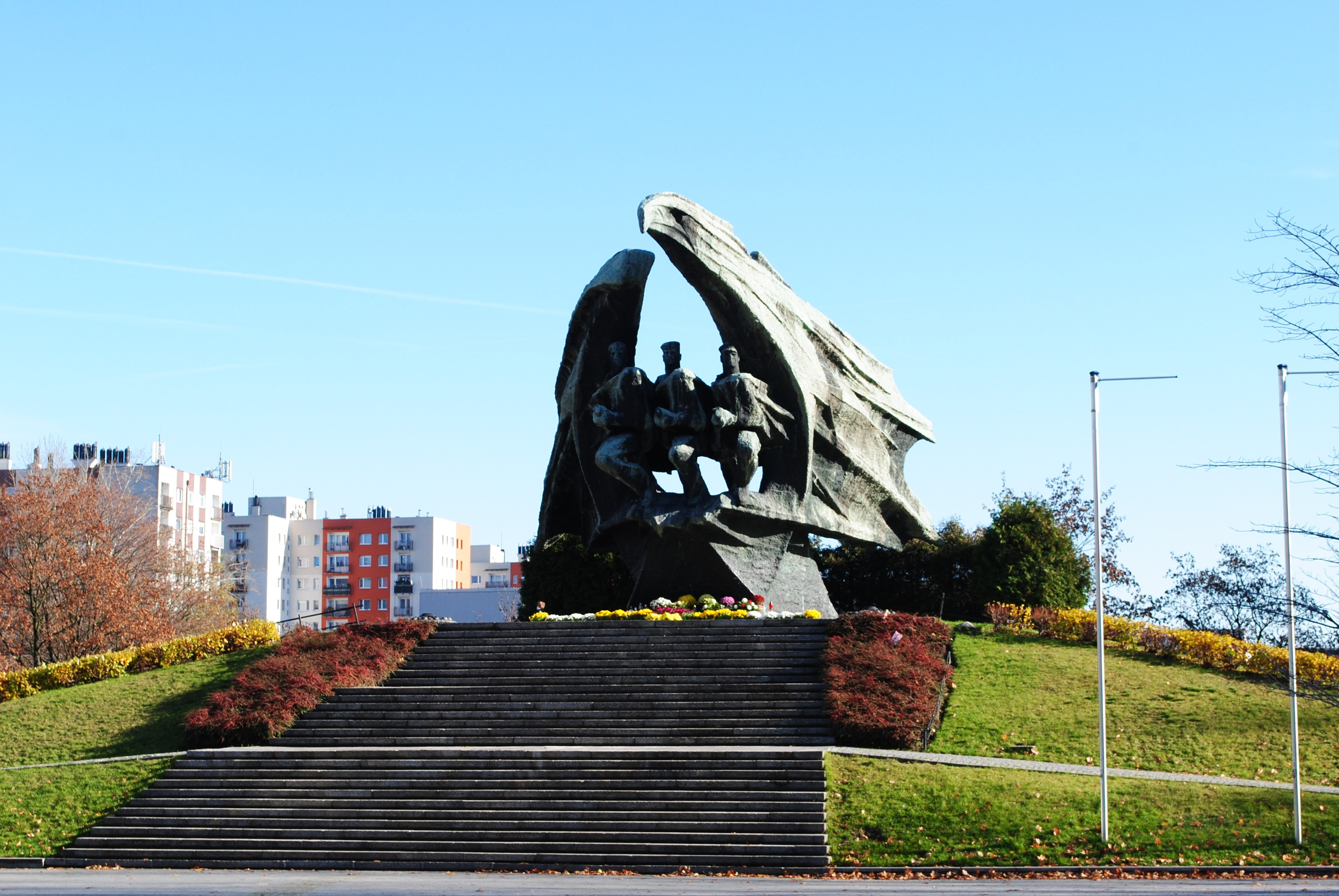
Monument to the Polish Soldier (Żołnierza Polskiego Square)

The following memorial sites are located in Osiedle Paderewskiego-Muchowiec:

- Boulder with a plaque commemorating French airmen (Lotnisko Street; on the grounds of Katowice-Muchowiec Airfield);
- Monument to Mining Labour (K. Pułaski Street) – monument by Tadeusz Łodziana, unveiled in 1986 as the authorities' response to the miners' freedom movements. In 2007, a skatepark was built in front of the monument;
- Monument to the Polish Soldier from World War II (Żołnierza Polskiego Square) – monument unveiled on 6 October 1978. The sculptor was Bronisław Chromy and the architect was Jerzy Pilitowski;
- Plaque dedicated to Pope John Paul II, who met with the faithful at the airfield on 20 April 1983 (Lotnisko Street; on the façade of the Katowice-Muchowiec Airfield building);
- Plaque commemorating Polish aviators, unveiled on the 60th anniversary of the triumph of Polish wings in the round trip flight Warsaw – Paris – Casablanca – Algiers – Tunis – Rome – Vienna – Katowice – Warsaw (Lotnisko Street; on the façade of the Katowice-Muchowiec Airfield building).

=== Zoning ===
The northern part of Osiedle Paderewskiego-Muchowiec consists mainly of residential areas with services, the central part of the district in the vicinity of the A4 motorway includes areas of city-wide service and commercial centers, while part of the district also includes recreational areas – the Valley of Three Ponds and the area of the Katowice-Muchowiec Airfield. In 2007, the share of built-up area in the total area of Osiedle Paderewskiego-Muchowiec was 24%, which was close to the average for the whole of Katowice (23%). The net floor area ratio was 0.62 at that time (higher than the index for Katowice – 0.49), while the average number of storeys was 2.58 (for Katowice as a whole – 2.13). In Osiedle Paderewskiego located in the district, the share of built-up area in the total area was 15% in 2007, the net floor area ratio was 1.28, and the average number of storeys was 8.53.

The study of conditions and directions of zoning of the city of Katowice distinguishes two urban units in the area of Osiedle Paderewskiego-Muchowiec: Muchowiec with an area of 663.63 ha and Osiedle Paderewskiego-Roździeńskiego with an area of 232.08 ha. The largest area of Muchowiec comprises: transport infrastructure (262.56 ha; 39.56% of the unit's area), forests (138.91 ha; 20.93% of the area), landscaped green areas (127.71 ha; 19.24% of the area), vacant building land (44.03 ha; 6.63% of the area) and service areas (41.43 ha; 6.24% of the area). There are no agricultural lands in this unit. Osiedle Paderewskiego-Roździeńskiego urban unit is also dominated by transport areas – 58.29 ha; 25.12% of the unit's area. In addition, the following types of development are mainly found there: landscaped green areas (42.46 ha; 18.30% of the area), residential and multi-family housing areas (41.37 ha; 17.83% of the area) and service areas (30.12 ha; 12.98% of the area). There are no agricultural areas, forests or wasteland in this unit.

== Education ==
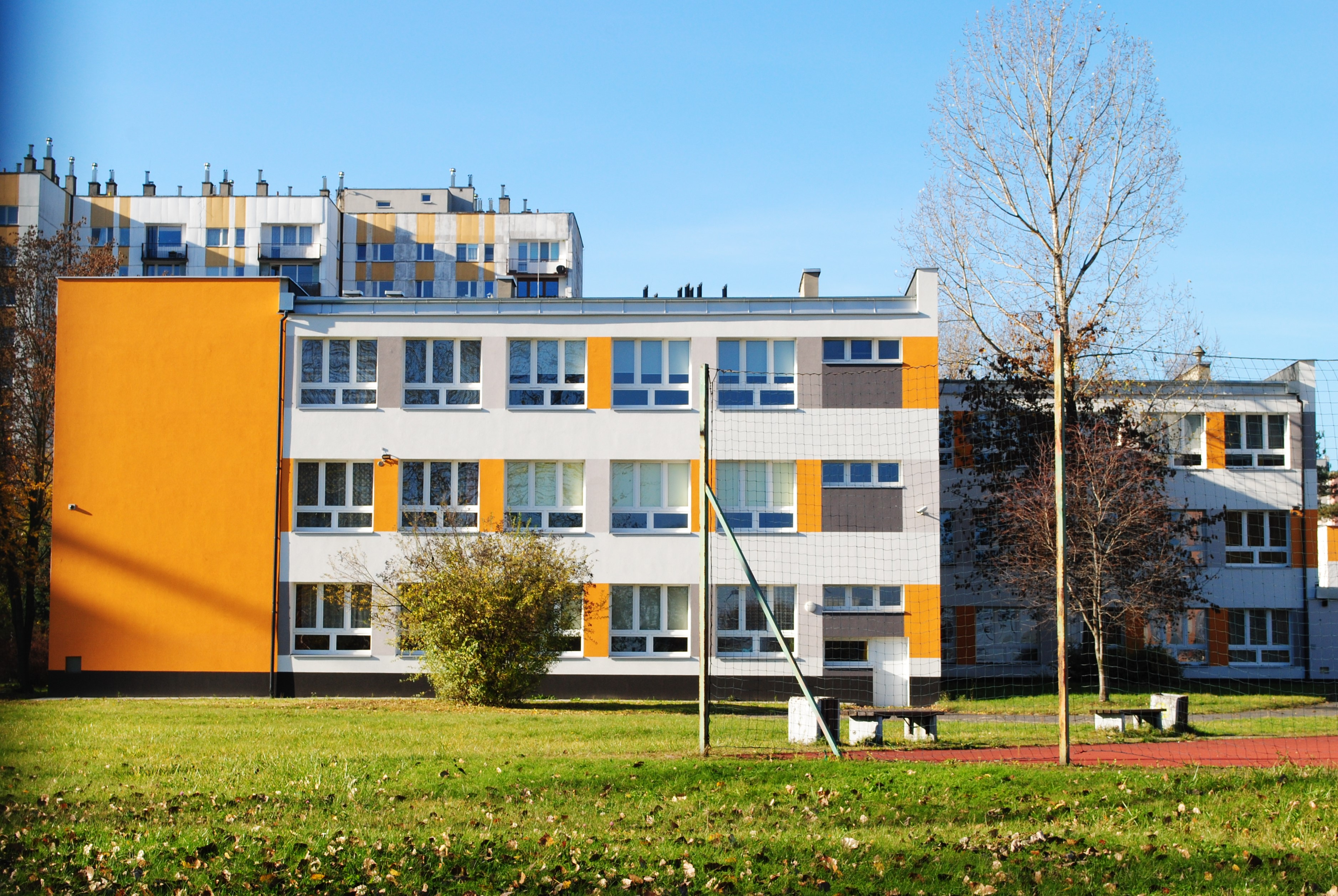
Building of School and Kindergarten Complex No. 9 (46 Graniczna Street)

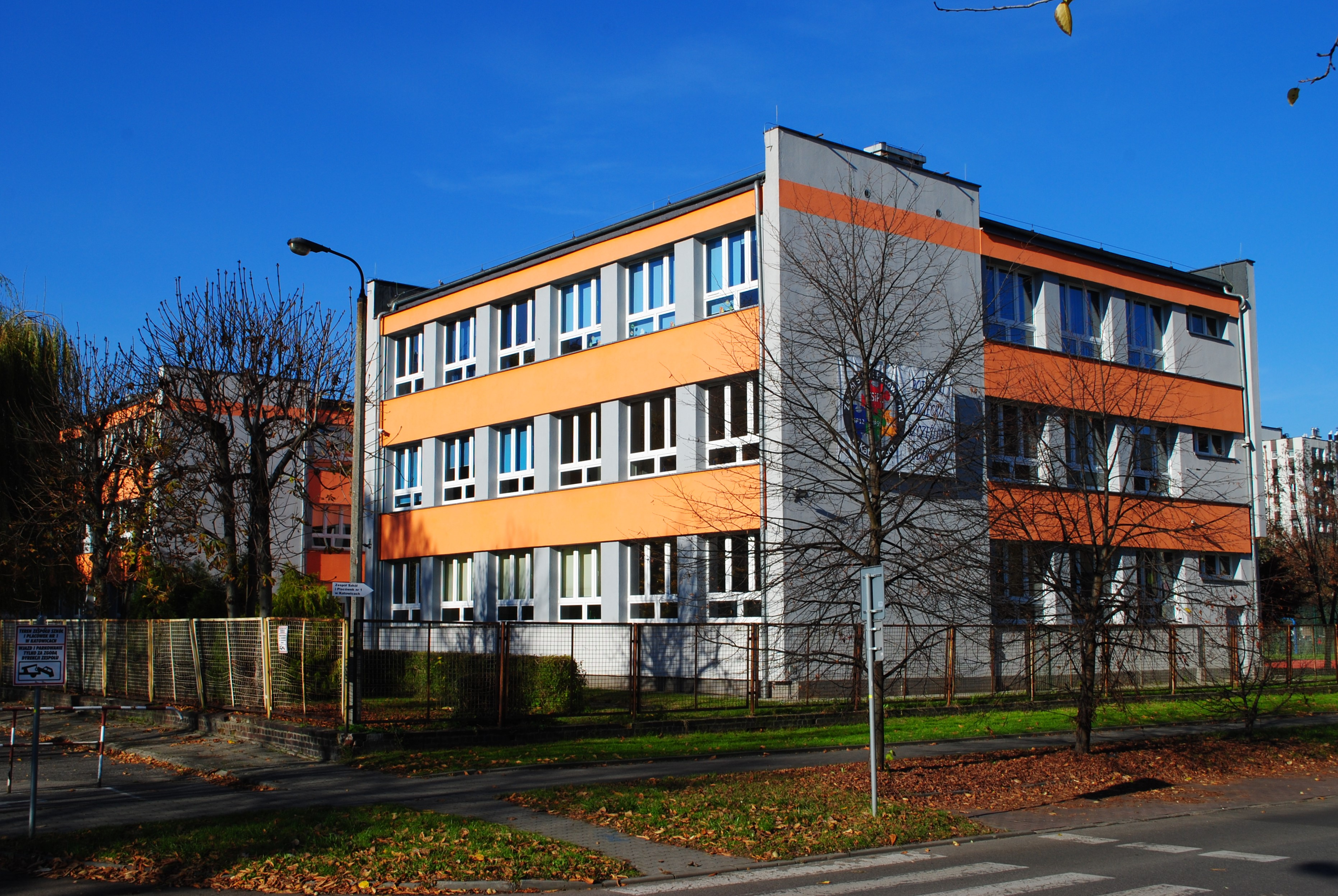
Building of School and Educational Institutions Complex No. 1 (46 I.J. Paderewski Street)

In April 2022, the following educational institutions operated in Osiedle Paderewskiego-Muchowiec:

- Nurseries:
  - Municipal Nursery in Katowice. Branch of the Municipal Nursery (1 S. Szeptycki Street);
  - Kosi Kosi Łapci Nursery (35/151 J. Sowiński Street).
- Kindergartens:
  - Bajkowa Kraina Katowice Centrum (32c I.J. Paderewski Street);
  - SuperKids Private Language Kindergarten (27 K. Pułaski Street);
  - Wesołe Siódemki Private Kindergarten (42 Graniczna Street).
- Complexes of institutions:
  - Private nursery and kindergarten (42 K. Pułaski Street);
  - W. Korfanty Social Primary School and General Secondary School of the Parents and Teachers Association (80 Francuska Street);
  - School and Kindergarten Complex No. 9:
    - Municipal Kindergarten No. 87 (44 Graniczna Street);
    - Jerzy Ziętek Primary School No. 4 (46 Graniczna Street);
- Others:
  - TEB Edukacja Katowice (25 K. Pułaski Street).

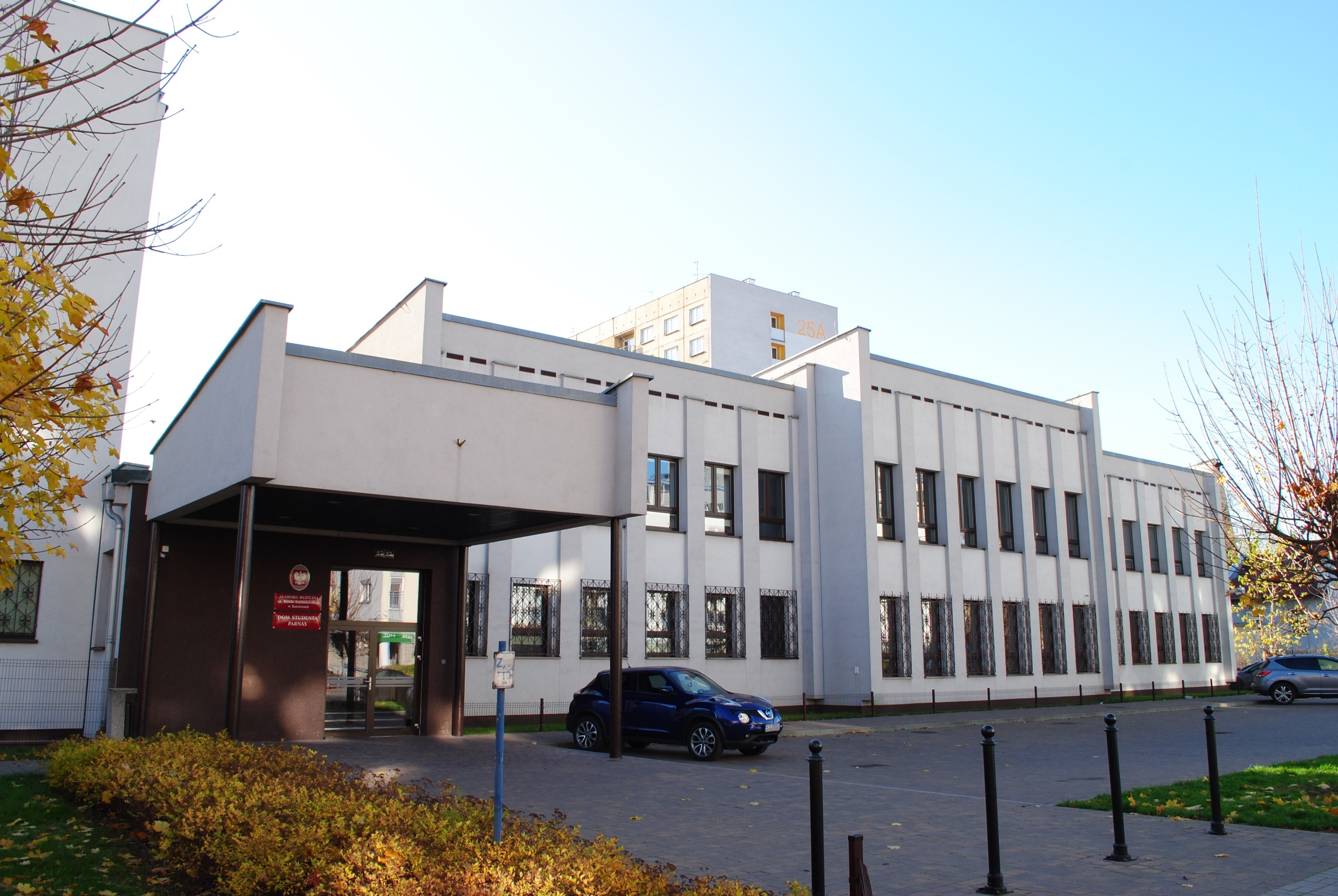
Parnas Student Dormitory of the Karol Szymanowski Academy of Music (27 Z. Krasiński Street)

Education and science in Osiedle Paderewskiego-Muchowiec began to develop particularly after World War II. Between 1957 and 1992, the Silesian Scientific Institute operated in the area. The institute conducted research in the fields of history, folklore, and culture, as well as socio-economic phenomena in the Silesian region. Since 1976, the institute had its headquarters in the building at 32 Graniczna Street. In the 1977/1978 school year, the current I.J. Paderewski Primary School No. 12 began operating in Osiedle Paderewskiego. On 1 September 1984, the second school in the estate, Primary School No. 4, was inaugurated. At that time, the school building was not yet fully completed, and 676 students were admitted in the first year of operation.

In 1991, the W. Korfanty Social Primary School and General Secondary School of the Parents and Teachers Association began operating in Muchowiec. A year later, it obtained public school status. On 30 November 2002, Primary School No. 12 gained its patron, Ignacy Jan Paderewski, and almost three years later, in September 2005, it was awarded the title of "School with Class". In 2006, a branch of TEB Edukacja school was opened in the district, operating in the former building P of the University of Economics in Katowice. On 1 September 2007, Municipal Kindergarten No. 77 was replaced by the Wesołe Siódemki Private Kindergarten, transforming it from a public kindergarten into a private one. On 1 September 2017, the I.J. Paderewski Primary School No. 12, the Inter-school Sports Centre, and Municipal Kindergarten No. 55 were merged into the School and Educational Institutions Complex No. 1. The new school complex is located in the building of Primary School No. 12 at 46 I.J. Paderewski Street. In September 2018, the Kosi Kosi Łapci Nursery began its activity, and a year later, on 1 September 2019, School and Kindergarten Complex No. 9 was established, located at 46 Graniczna Street. It consisted of: Jerzy Ziętek Primary School No. 4 and Julian Tuwim Municipal Kindergarten No. 87.

== Public safety ==
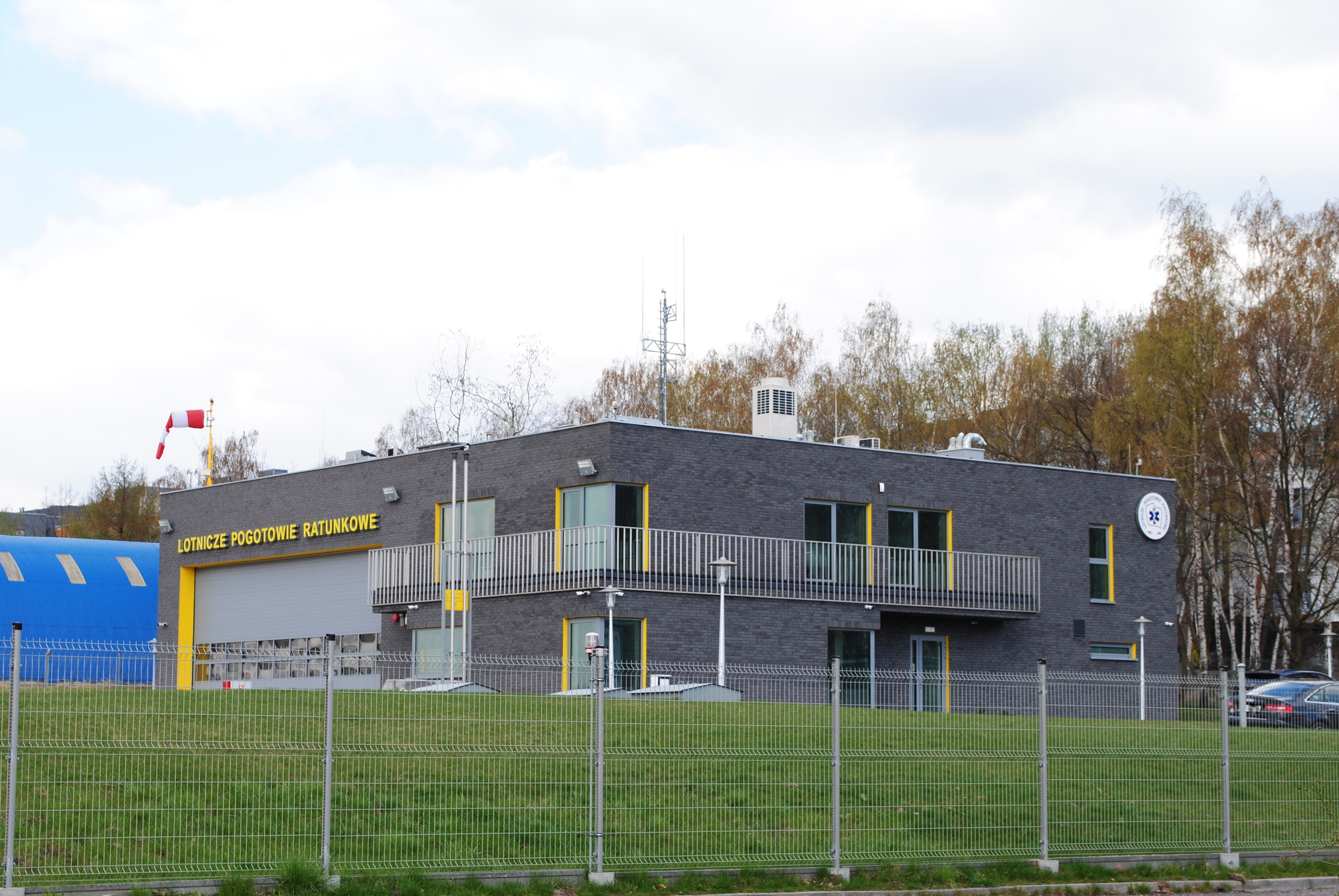
Base of the HEMS Katowice Medical Air Rescue (34 Lotnisko Street)

In terms of the crime rate in 2007, Osiedle Paderewskiego-Muchowiec was the 16th safest district out of 22 districts. In 2007, the crime rate was 2.95 crimes per 100 residents (for Katowice as a whole, the rate was 3.08 in 2007). Compared to 2004, this rate decreased from 4.90. In 2007, there were 11 traffic accidents in the district. In 2013, 350 crimes were reported, which amounted to 30 criminal acts per 1,000 inhabitants. During this time, there were, among others, 15 robberies and 8 acts of hooliganism. According to a survey conducted in 2011, 81.8% of respondents from Osiedle Paderewskiego-Muchowiec indicated that they felt safe in their district, while 13.6% were of the opposite opinion. Osiedle Paderewskiego-Muchowiec is covered by the First Police Station in Katowice, located in the neighbouring Śródmieście district at 28 Żwirki i Wigury Street, while Osiedle Paderewskiego itself is covered by video surveillance supervised by the public safety answering point.

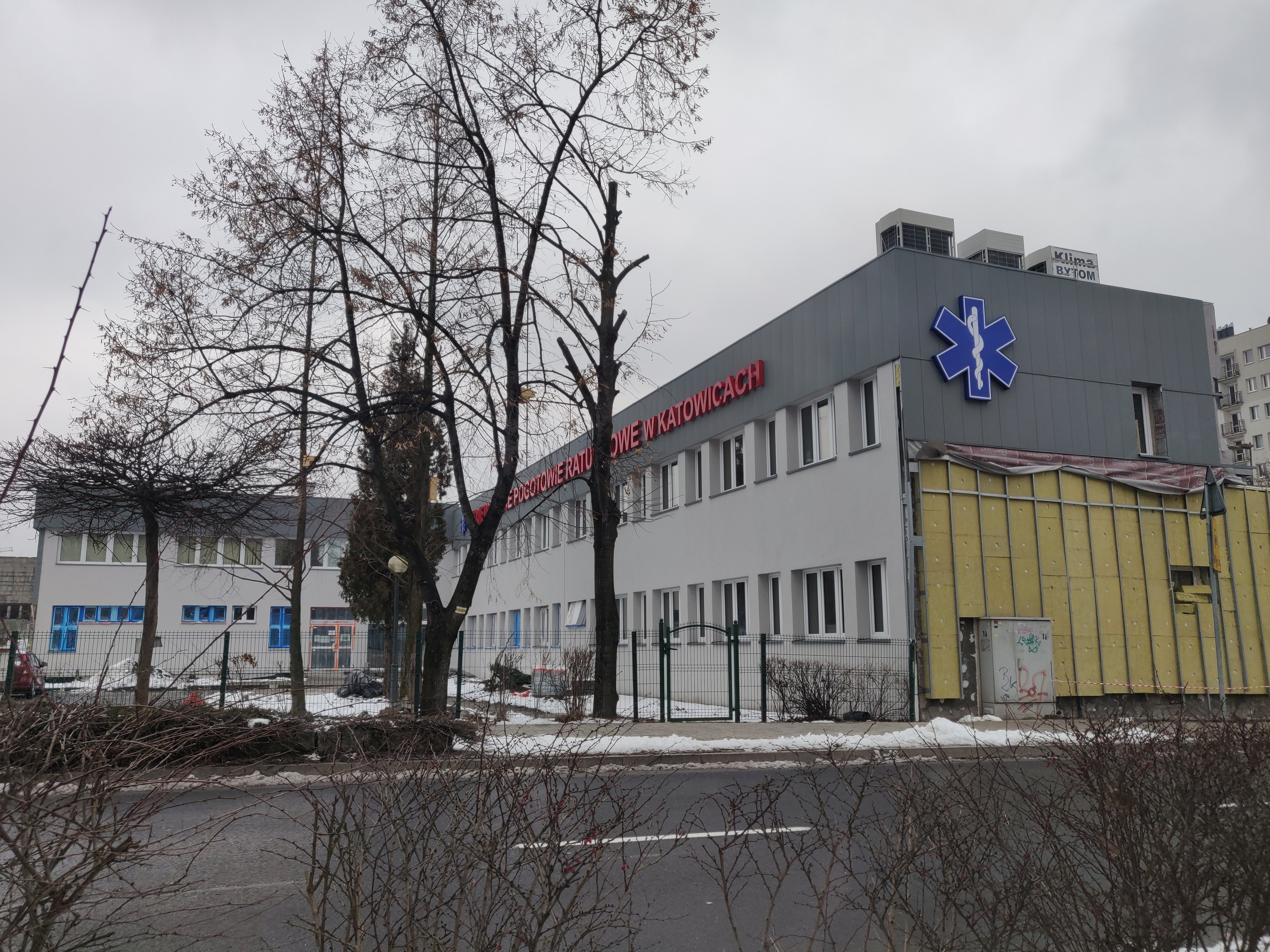
Base of the Provincial Emergency Medical Service in Katowice (52 Powstańców Street)

Fire protection for Osiedle Paderewskiego-Muchowiec is provided by Rescue and Firefighting Unit No. 3 of the Municipal Headquarters of the State Fire Service in Katowice, located in Śródmieście at 11 Wojewódzka Street.

Within the boundaries of Osiedle Paderewskiego-Muchowiec, at 52 Powstańców Street, there is a base of the Provincial Emergency Medical Service in Katowice. In 2019, there were 77 medical rescue teams operating within the structure of the Provincial Emergency Medical Service and 11 outside the structure. The ambulance service has had its current base since 1 April 1967, and it was initially intended to be a temporary location. The Katowice-Muchowiec Airfield, at 34 Lotnisko Street, also houses the base of the Polish Medical Air Rescue.

As of mid-April 2022, other medical and care facilities in Osiedle Paderewskiego-Muchowiec include:

- Iskierka Children's Rehabilitation Centre, Iskierka Private Multi-specialist Psychological and Pedagogical Counselling Centre (63 I.J. Paderewski Street);
- Medis Private Medical Centre (1 S. Szeptycki Street);
- Private Healthcare Centre Graniczna (45 Graniczna Street).

== Culture ==
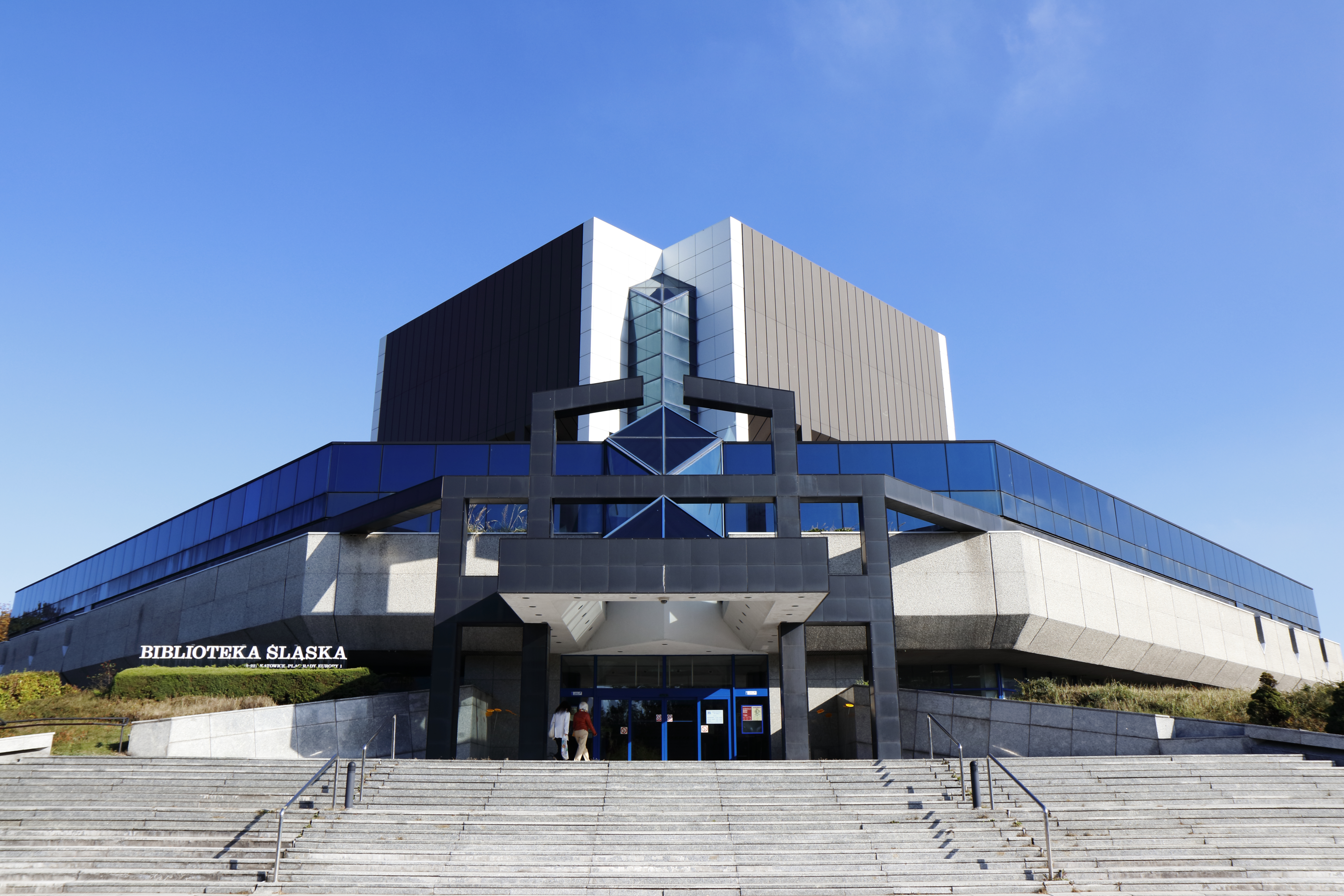
Headquarters of the Silesian Library (1 Council of Europe Square)

The largest cultural institution in Osiedle Paderewskiego-Muchowiec is the Silesian Library, located at 1 Council of Europe Square. It is a provincial public library with scientific status, the central institution of this type for public libraries located in the Silesian Voivodeship. In 2012, it had 1.9 million volumes and units. In addition to the Silesian Library, Branch No. 23 of the Municipal Public Library is located in Osiedle Paderewskiego-Muchowiec, specifically in Osiedle Paderewskiego at 65 I.J. Paderewski Street. In addition to a lending library and reading room, the branch organizes, among other things, library lessons, series of meetings for children, computer workshops for adults, and various types of events and activities.

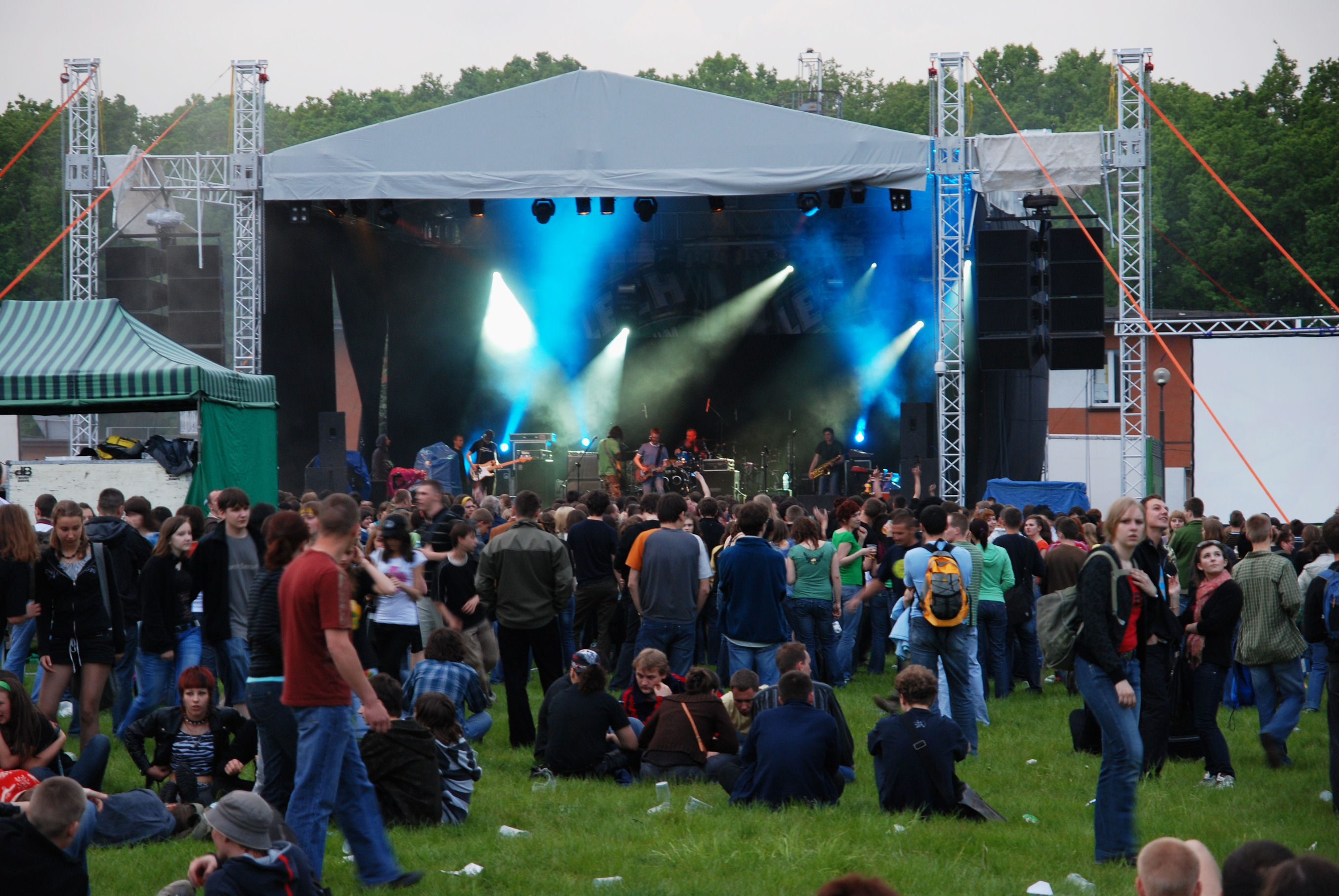
Silesian Juwenalia 2008 at the Katowice-Muchowiec Airfield

The I.J. Paderewski Housing Cooperative manages the Rezonans community club located at 5a J. Sowiński Street. The club organizes activities for all age groups, including an art and modeling section for children, art workshops for adults, a bridge section, meetings and computer courses for seniors, karate, ballet and contemporary dance classes for children, Pilates, gymnastics for seniors, health gymnastics, martial arts and English lessons for children.

Bujnowicz Konsorcjum, which brings together brands owned by Marcin Bujnowicz, has its headquarters at 5a J. Sowiński Street and 27 Graniczna Street. The company was founded on 1 May 1997, and in 2015 it was divided into several areas of activity. The Bujnowicz Group includes the Conbcerto Music Agency – an organization involved in creative activities related to culture and entertainment. Within the educational activities of the group there are two entities: the Artistic Academy Artistic Institution and the Artistic Academy Continuing Education Institution, Ziarno Talentu Foundation, established to promote music and art and support education, also operates as part of the consortium.

The grounds of the Katowice-Muchowiec Airfield are also a venue for various types of city events. Festivals such as Off Festival have been organized there.

== Religion ==
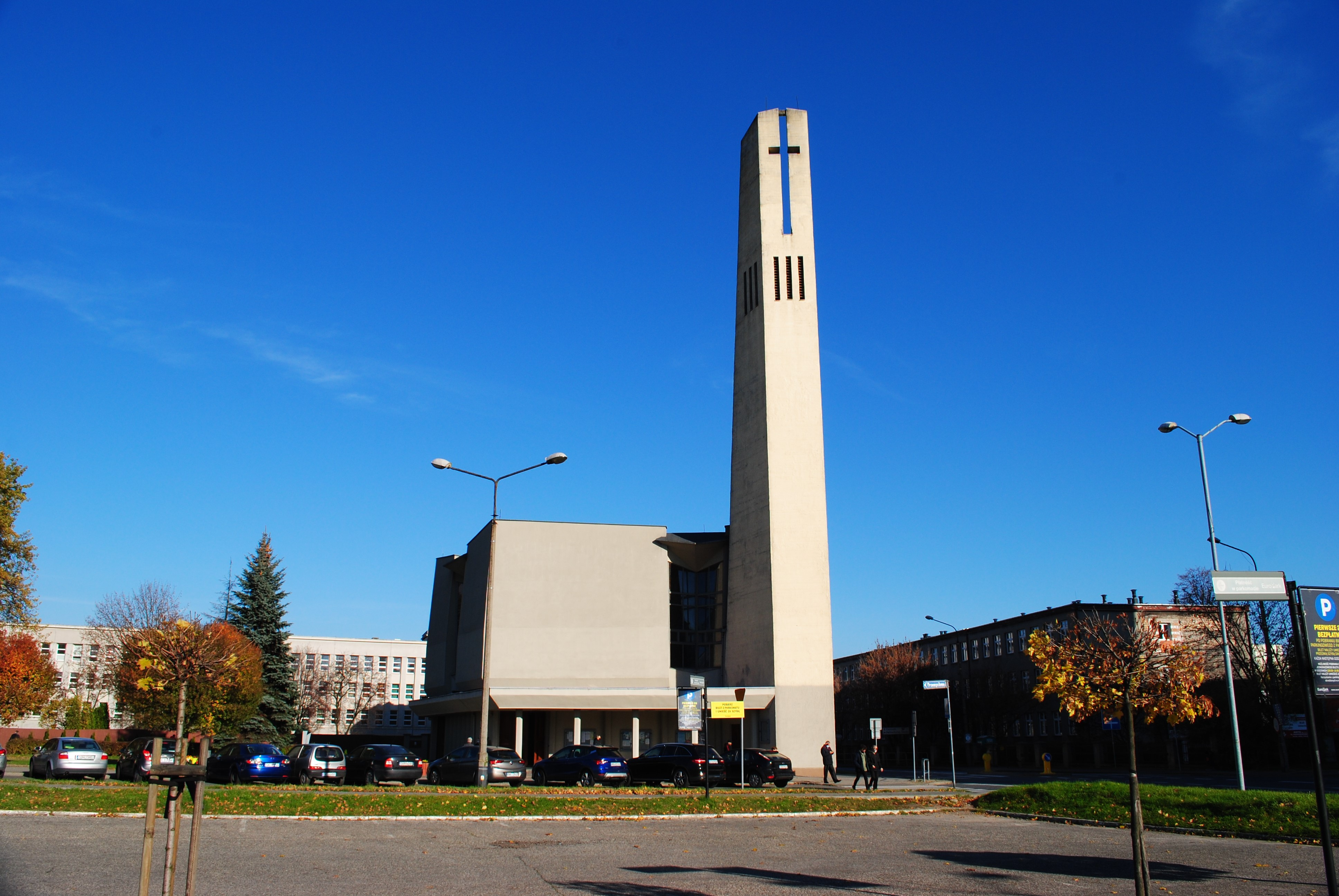
Church of the Assumption of Mary seen from the south

The most developed and largest religious structure in Osiedle Paderewskiego-Muchowiec is the Roman Catholic Church. Located at 28 Graniczna Street, it is the Parish of the Assumption of Mary, which belongs to the Katowice-Śródmieście deanery of the Archdiocese of Katowice.

The construction of the Church of the Assumption of Mary, adjacent to the Provincial House of the Congregation of the Sisters of Mary Immaculate, began on 2 May 1951. The parish was established on 1 May 1952, and its existence was confirmed by the Bishop of Katowice, Damian Zimoń, in a decree dated 19 February 1992. The new parish covered Osiedle Paderewskiego from the boundaries of the existing parishes: of St. Mary, the Cathedral, and Divine Providence. Between 1980 and 1983, a new church was constructed on the site of the previous building. It was dedicated on 11 October 1997.

=== Cemeteries ===
In Osiedle Paderewskiego-Muchowiec, on the site of the Richard Holtze Square established in 2011, there used to be an old Evangelical cemetery. It was established in 1856 on land donated by Friedrich Grundmann at the present K. Damrot Street and covered an area of 42 acres. The cemetery was later enlarged twice. The founders of Katowice, Friedrich Grundmann and Richard Holtze, mayors of Katowice, entrepreneurs, and distinguished residents were buried there. The cemetery functioned until 1945, after which it was closed after World War II, and in the 1970s, a square was located there. In 2002, a plaque commemorating the Evangelicals buried in the former cemetery was unveiled there.

== Sport and recreation ==
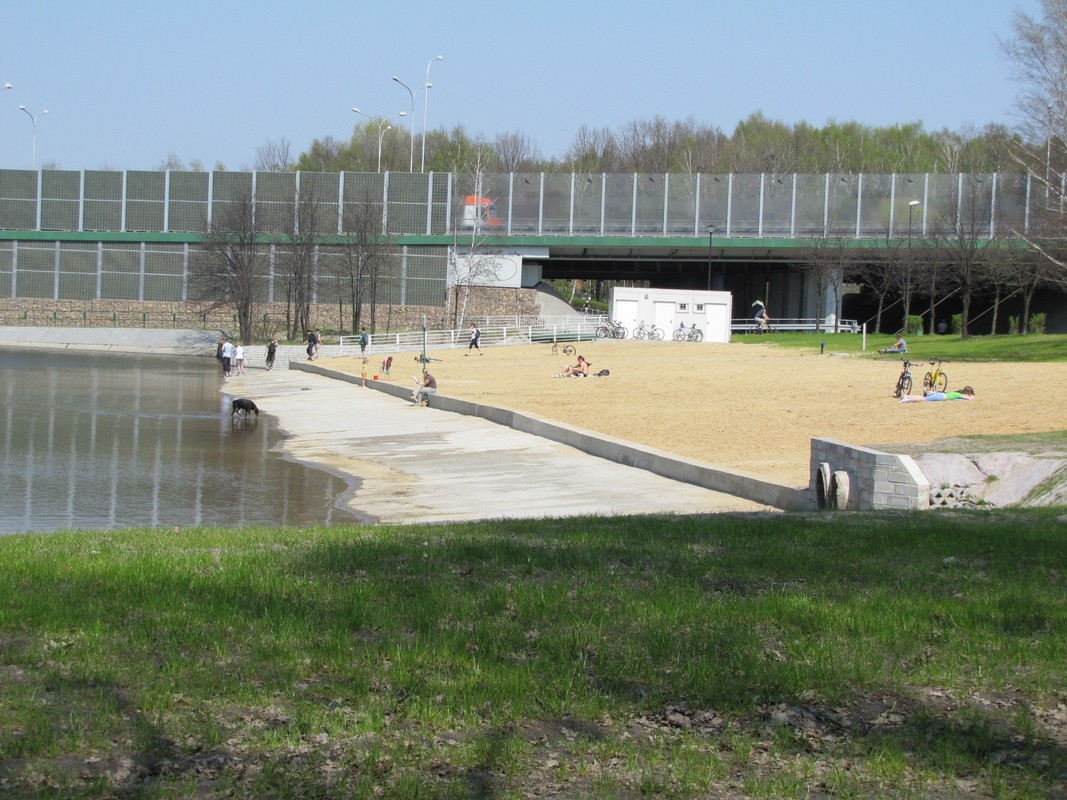
Bathing area in the Valley of Three Ponds

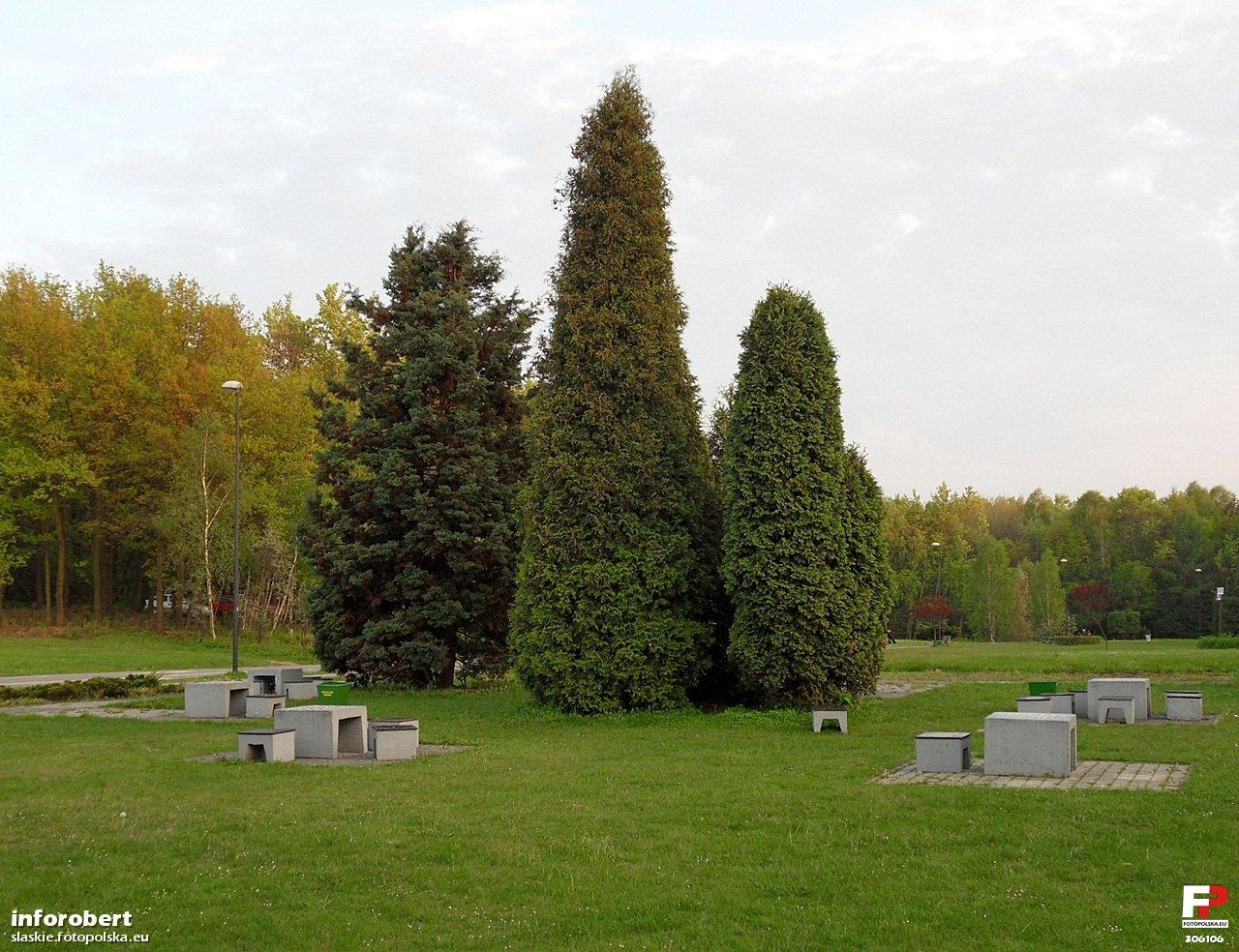
Fragment of the developed part of the Katowice Forest Park

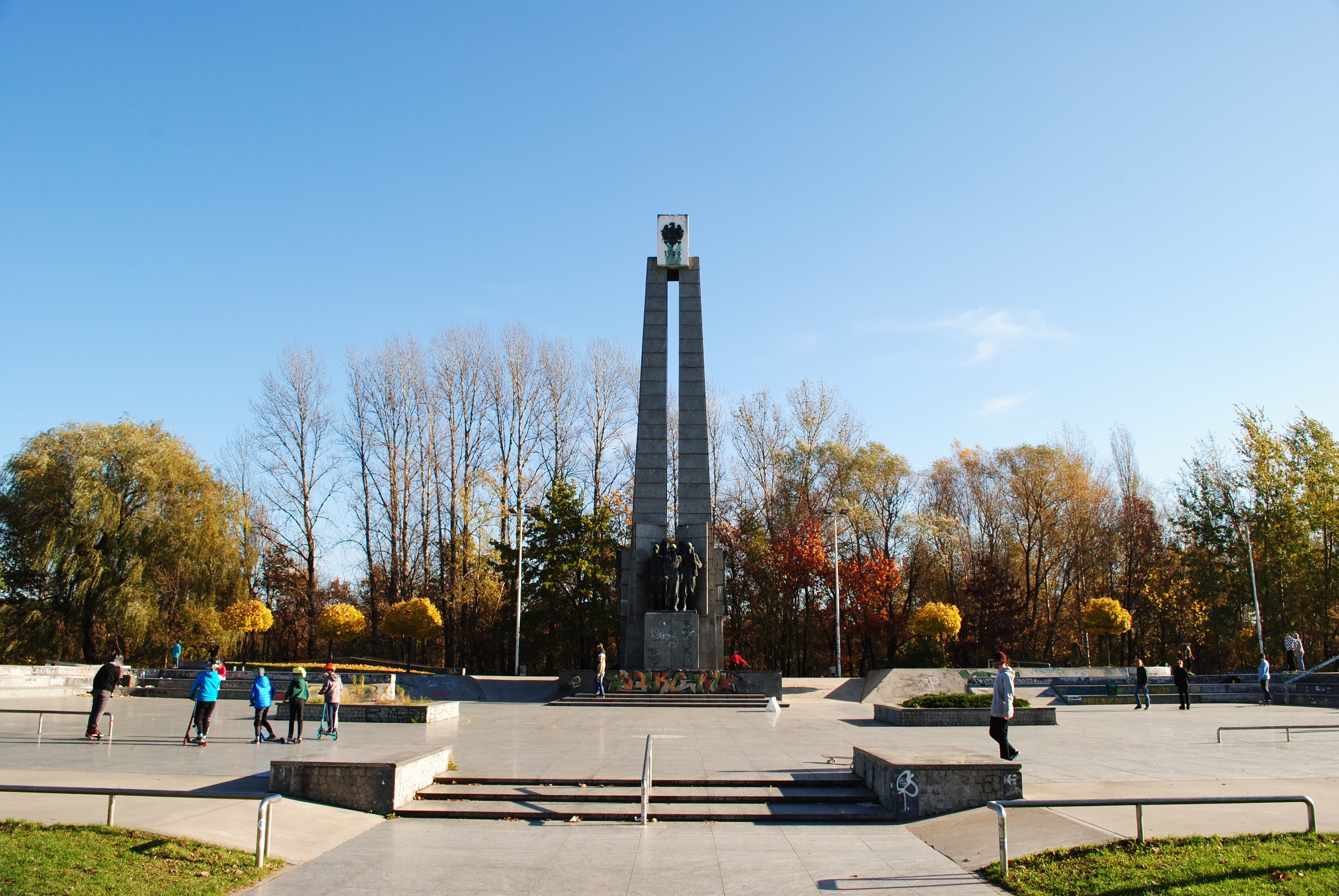
Skatepark in front of the Monument to Mining Labour (K. Pułaski Street; view from the street side)

The following sports and recreation facilities are located within the boundaries of Osiedle Paderewskiego-Muchowiec:

- Camping 215 (6 Murckowska Street), managed by the Katowice Municipal Sports and Recreation Center;
- Valley of Three Ponds and Katowice Forest Park – one of the outdoor areas for active recreation for the residents of Katowice. The neighbouring Katowice Forest Park has the largest concentration of sports and recreation facilities, including: a playground with an outdoor gym, a canoeing marina, a rollerblading and cycling route, and bicycle paths;
- Sports hall at Jerzy Ziętek Primary School No. 4 (46 Graniczna Street) – a hall 40 m long and 18 m wide, adapted for volleyball, basketball, handball, and soccer;
- Muchowiec tennis courts (188 Francuska Street);
- Horse riding centers (180a and 182 Francuska Street);
- Swimming pool at the Inter-school Sports Center (46a I.J. Paderewski Street) – the Inter-school Sports Center also has a 31×17 m sports hall and a corrective gymnastics room. In 2013, work was completed on the modernization of the swimming pool basin;
- Skatepark (K. Pułaski Street) – located near the A4 motorway, on the square in front of the Monument to Mining Labour. It is a professional facility of this type, opened in 2011. It is equipped with special walls, ramps, stairs, platforms, jumps, ramps, and rails.

In the 1930s, a sports field was opened in the Muchowiec area. It was a football field belonging to the Erster Fußball Club, which operated between 1934 and 1945. During Polska Ludowa, a stadium with the first speedway track in Katowice operated in Muchowiec. The field belonged to Gwardia Katowice, and it was adapted for speedway competitions shortly after World War II – the speedway track for the Katowice Motorcycle Club and the motorcycle section of KS Pogoń Katowice was built in 1947. Between 1957 and 1966, the stadium was home to the horse stud of the Regional Equestrian Association, and between 1965 and 1990, KS Start Katowice operated there. Currently, tennis courts are located on the site of the former playing field.

In 2007, there were five sports clubs operating in Osiedle Paderewskiego and 2 in Muchowiec. In June 2013, the following sports clubs, registered with the Katowice City Hall, had their headquarters in Osiedle Paderewskiego-Muchowiec:

- Inter-school Sports Club of the Inter-school Sports Center (46a I.J. Paderewski Street);
- 4 Student Sports Club (10 Trzech Stawów Street);
- Akademia Piłkarska Silesia Student Sports Club (9/64 J. Sowiński Street);
- Hockey Club Hockey 4All Sports Club (53/73 Graniczna Street);
- Volley Sports Club (85/4 I.J. Paderewski Street).

The following tourist trails pass through Osiedle Paderewskiego-Muchowiec:

- Katowice Walking Trail: Silesian Park – Wełnowiec – Śródmieście – Muchowiec – Murcki Valley – Hamerla;
- Upper Silesian Mining History Trail: Łubianki – Siemianowice Śląskie – Katowice (Valley of Three Ponds) – Mikołów – Orzesze – Rybnik;
- Park Trail: Kościuszko Park – Katowice Forest Park.

== Bibliography ==
- Barciak, Antoni; Chojecka, Ewa; Fertacz, Sylwester, eds. (2012). Katowice. Środowisko, dzieje, kultura, język i społeczeństwo [Katowice. Environment, History, Culture, Language and Society] (in Polish). Katowice: Museum of the History of Katowice. ISBN 978-83-87727-24-6.
- Bartoszek, A.; Czekaj, K.; Trawkowska, D., eds. (2012). Diagnoza problemów społecznych i monitoring polityki społecznej dla aktywizacji zasobów ludzkich w Katowicach [Diagnosis of Social Problems and Monitoring of Social Policy for the Activation of Human Resources in Katowice] (in Polish). Katowice: University of Silesia. ISBN 978-83-61061-97-7.
- Bulsa, Michał (2018). Ulice i place Katowic [Streets and Squares of Katowice] (in Polish) (3rd ed.). Katowice: Prasa i Książka. ISBN 978-83-63780-28-9.
- Bulsa, M.; Szmatloch, B. (2019). Katowice, których nie ma [Katowice That No Longer Exists] (in Polish). Łódź: Księży Młyn. ISBN 978-83-7729-502-1.
- Chmielewska, Marta (2016). Morfologiczne przekształcenia przestrzeni miejskiej Katowic [Morphological Transformations of the Urban Space of Katowice] (in Polish). Katowice: University of Silesia Press. ISBN 978-83-8012-837-8.
- Drobek, Daria; Michalska, Ewa; Radecki, Ryszard; Perdyła, Magdalena (January 2014). Opracowanie ekofizjograficzne podstawowe z elementami opracowania ekofizjograficznego problemowego (problematyka ochrony dolin rzecznych oraz ograniczeń dla zagospodarowania terenu wynikających z wpływu działalności górniczej) dla potrzeb opracowania projektów miejscowych planów zagospodarowania przestrzennego obszarów położonych w mieście Katowice [Basic Ecophysiographic Study with Elements of a Problem-Oriented Ecophysiographic Study (Issues of River Valley Protection and Constraints on Land Development Resulting from the Impact of Mining Activity) for the Purposes of Preparing Draft Local Spatial Development Plans for Areas Located within the City of Katowice] (in Polish). Katowice: Werona.
- Drobniak, A.; Polko, A.; Plac, K., eds. (2014). Diagnoza sytuacji społeczno-ekonomicznej Miasta Katowice wraz z wyznaczeniem obszarów rewitalizacji i analizą strategiczną [Diagnosis of the Socio-Economic Situation of the City of Katowice, Including the Designation of Revitalization Areas and Strategic Analysis] (PDF) (in Polish). Katowice: City of Katowice. ISBN 978-83-61061-97-7.
- Dulias, R.; Hibszer, A., eds. (2008). Górnośląski Związek Metropolitalny. Zarys geograficzny [Upper Silesian Metropolitan Union. Geographical Outline] (in Polish). Sosnowiec: Polish Geographical Society, Katowice Branch. ISBN 978-83-61695-00-4.
- Frużyński, A.; Grzegorek, G.; Rygus, P. (2017). Kopalnie i huty Katowic [Mines and Steelworks of Katowice] (in Polish). Katowice: Prasa i Książka. ISBN 978-83-63780-23-4.
- "Strategia rozwoju sportu Miasta Katowice do 2022 roku" [Sports Development Strategy of the City of Katowice until 2022] (PDF). bip.katowice.eu (in Polish). 18 December 2013.
- Zemła, Marek, ed. (25 April 2012). Studium uwarunkowań i kierunków zagospodarowania przestrzennego miasta Katowice – II edycja. Część 1. Uwarunkowania zagospodarowania przestrzennego [Study of the Conditions and Directions of Spatial Development of the City of Katowice – Second Edition. Part One. Conditions of Spatial Development] (PDF) (in Polish). Katowice: Biuro Rozwoju Regionu.
- Szaraniec, Lech (1996). Osady i osiedla Katowic [Settlements and Housing Estates of Katowice] (in Polish). Katowice: Artur. ISBN 83-905115-0-9.
- Szaraniec, Lech (2019). Moje Katowice IV [My Katowice IV] (in Polish). Katowice: Śląsk. ISBN 978-83-60781-30-2.
- Soida, K., ed. (1997). Dzieje katowickiego okręgu kolejowego [History of the Katowice Railway District] (in Polish). Katowice: Silesian Regional Directorate of the State Railways. ISBN 83-908518-0-6.
