= Śródmieście, Katowice =

District of Katowice

Śródmieście
- Katowice District
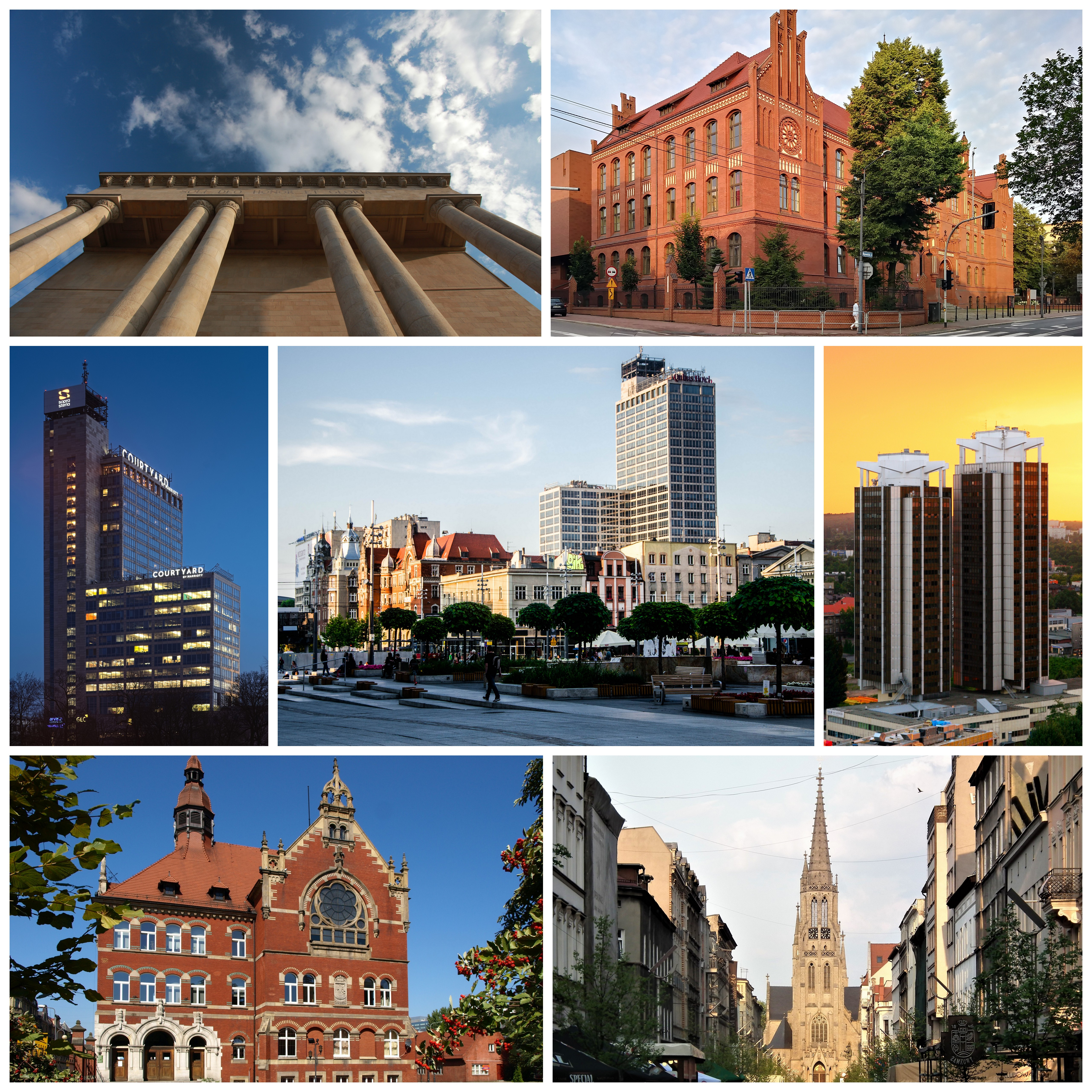
- Cathedral of Christ the King, Karol Szymanowski Academy of Music building, Altus Skyscraper, Market Square, Stalexport Skyscrapers, Adam Mickiewicz High School building, Mariacka Street, and St. Mary's Church visible in the background

- Location of Śródmieście within Katowice
- Coordinates: 50°07′5.30″N 18°58′27.13″E
- Country: Poland
- Voivodeship: Silesian
- County/City: Katowice

Area
  - Total: 3.81 km^{2} (1.47 sq mi)

Population (2020)
  - Total: 25,320
  - Density: 6,650/km^{2} (17,200/sq mi)
- Time zone: UTC+1 (CET)
  - Summer (DST): UTC+2 (CEST)

Śródmieście [ɕrudˈmjɛɕt͡ɕɛ] ('city centre', German: Innenstadt) is the central district (dzielnica) of the city of Katowice in southern Poland. It is located in a complex of downtown districts, between Dąb, Koszutka, Bogucice, Zawodzie, Osiedle Paderewskiego-Muchowiec, Brynów-Osiedle Zgrzebnioka, and Załęże, on the Rawa river. It has an area of 3.81 km^{2} and in 2020 had 25,320 inhabitants.

With over 50% of its area covered by buildings, Śródmieście is the most urbanized part of Katowice. The history of Śródmieście is closely linked to the history of Katowice, first mentioned in the 16th century. Since then, especially since the 19th century, with the arrival of the railway, industrial development, and the incorporation of neighboring towns, Śródmieście has transformed into the administrative and service center of Katowice. The district is home to Silesian Parliament, the headquarters of the Silesian Voivodeship Sejmik, the Metropolitan Office of Metropolis GZM, and the Katowice City Hall, as well as a number of institutions, including the Silesian Museum, Silesian Library, the University of Silesia, the Karol Szymanowski Academy of Music, Silesian Theatre, and the Roman Catholic Archdiocese of Katowice. There are also international companies like ING or Citibank. There are several consulates in the city centre, as well as the headquarters and branches of state and local government administration bodies.

The master plan of Central Katowice was designed by Friedrich Grundmann in the second half of the 19th century.

Extensive city growth took place during the Industrial Revolution. The centre has the finest examples of Modernism such as International Style and Bauhaus. Central Katowice also contain a significant number of Art Nouveau (Secesja) buildings along with the Communist Era giants such as Spodek or Superjednostka.

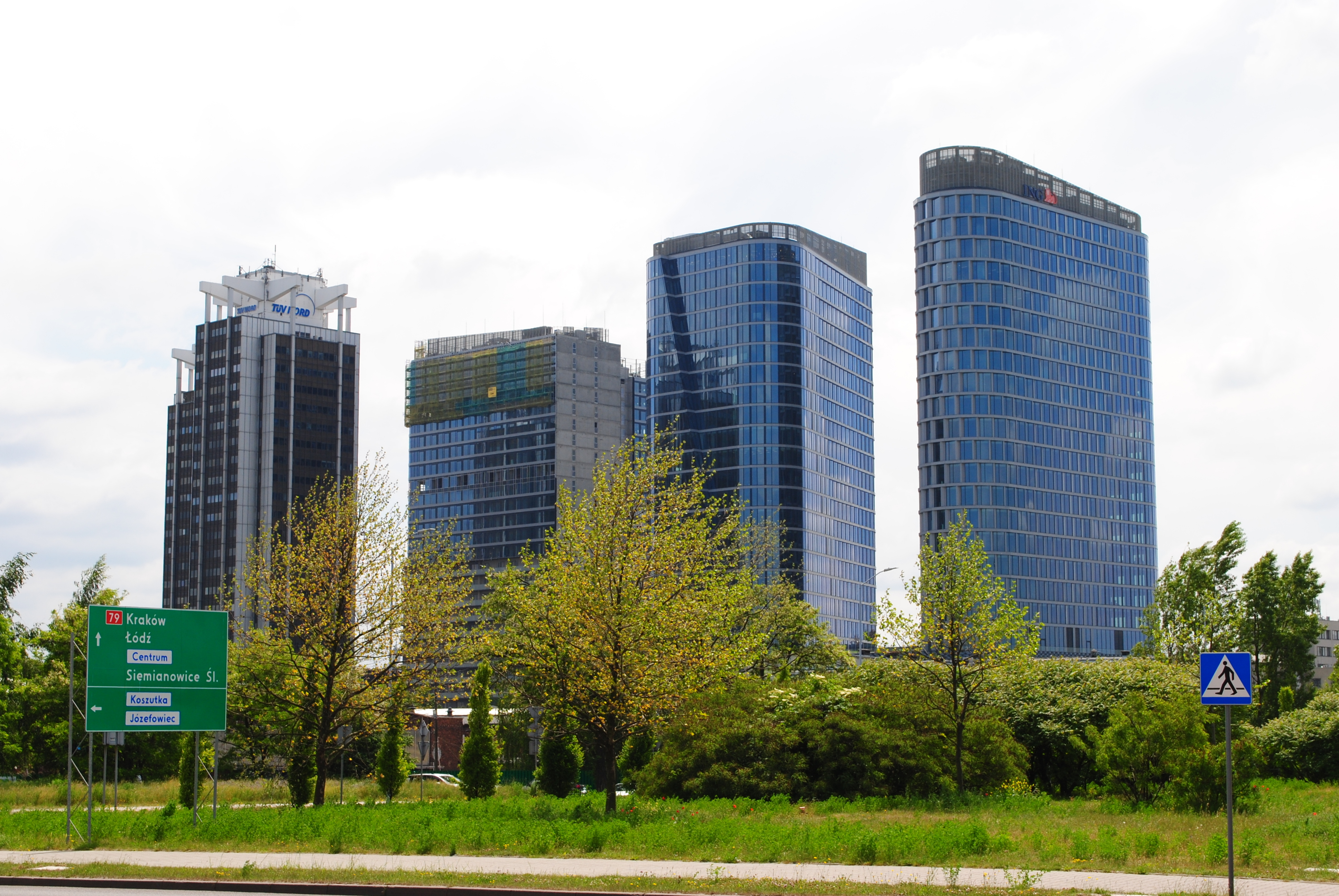
Skyline

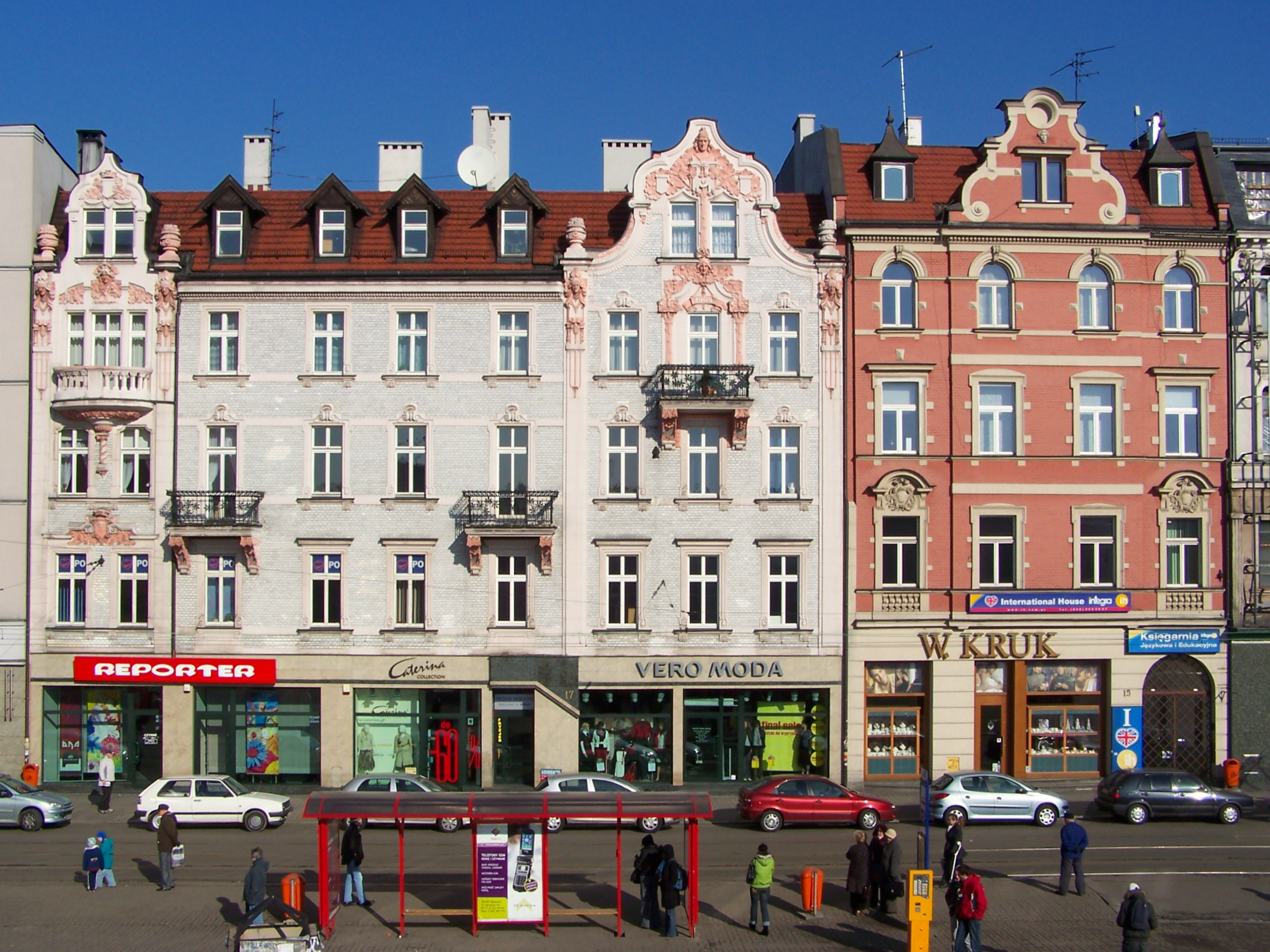
19th century buildings in Central Katowice

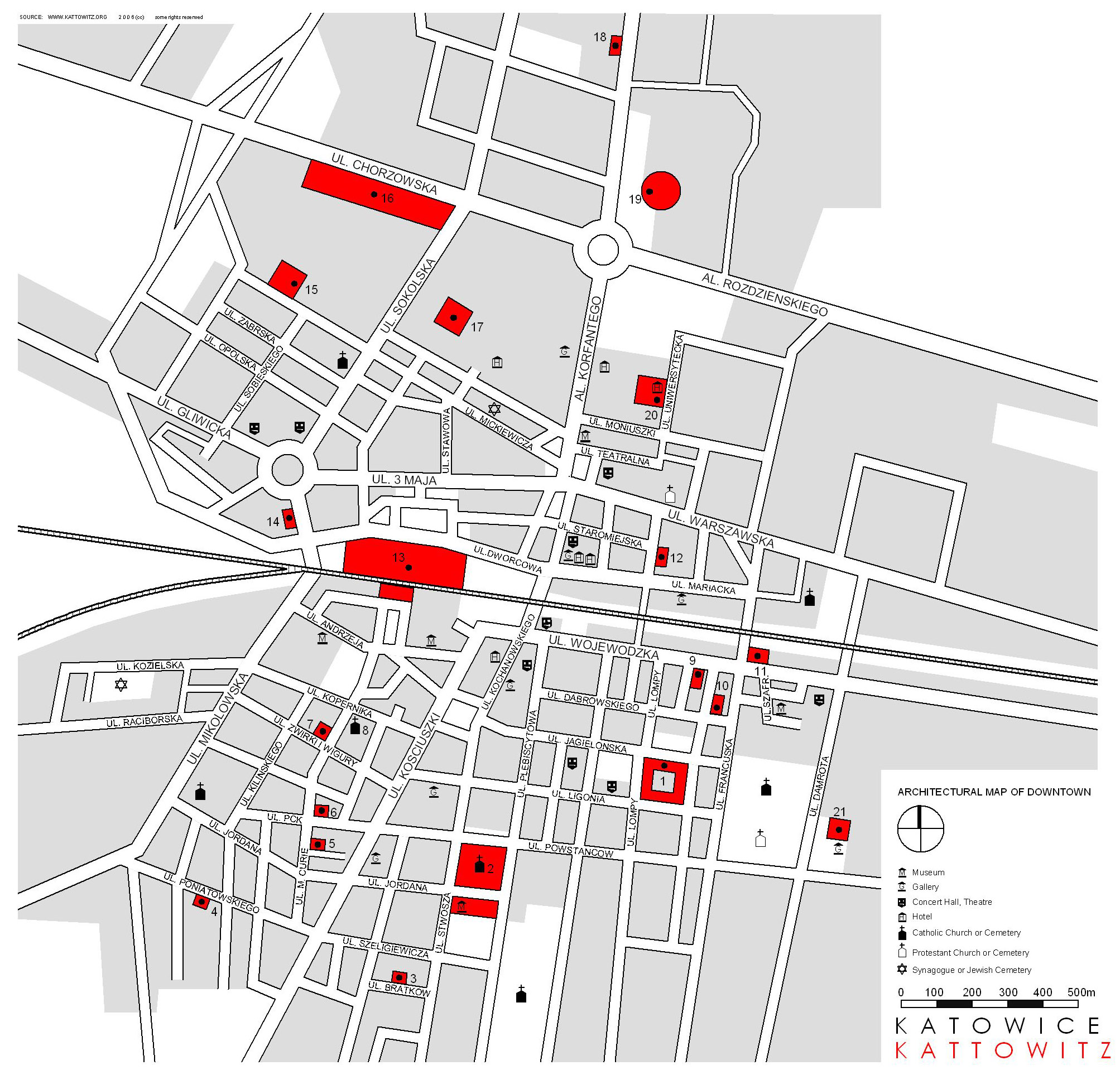
Map of Central Katowice

== Geography ==
=== Location ===
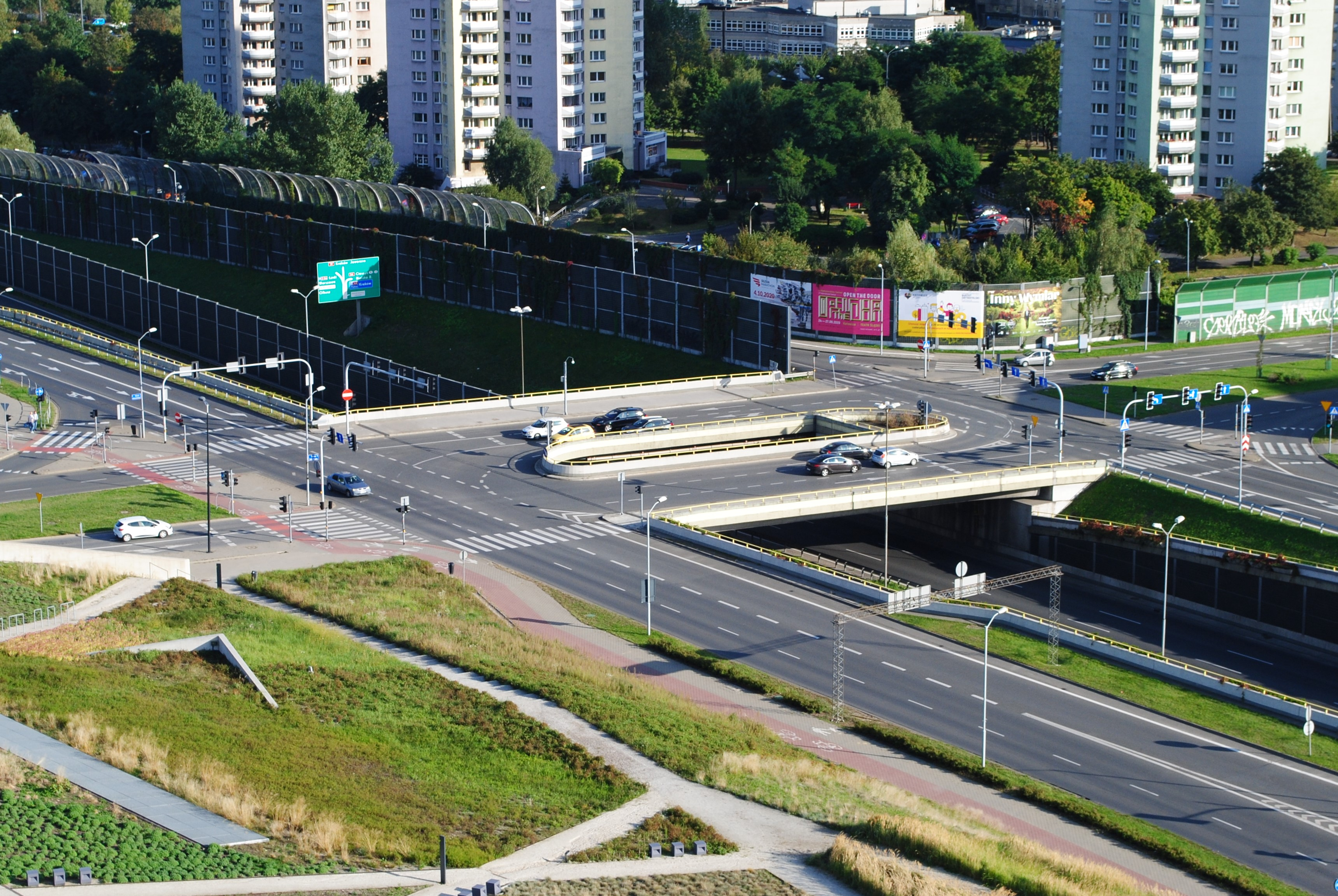
Intersection of W. Roździeński Avenue with T. Dobrowolski Street and J. Duda-Gracz Street in the area where the boundaries of Zawodzie (top), Śródmieście (right), and Bogucice (bottom of the photo) meet

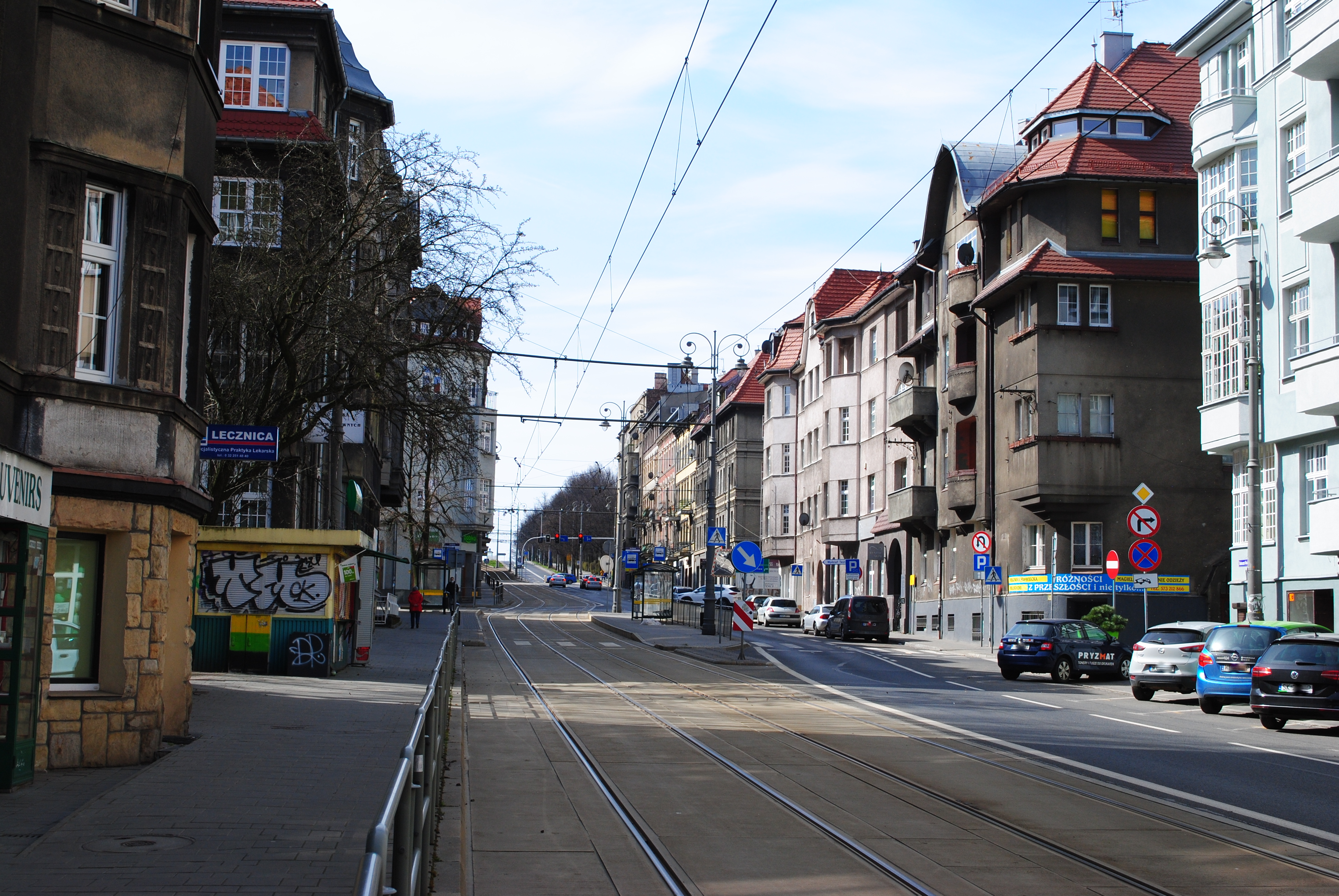
T. Kościuszko Street at the intersection with Powstańców Street; this road runs towards Beata Hill, one of the hills of the Kochłowice Hills

Śródmieście is one of the 22 districts of Katowice, functioning as an auxiliary unit of gmina no. 1 within the group of downtown districts. It borders Koszutka and Bogucice to the north, Zawodzie and Osiedle Paderewskiego-Muchowiec to the east, Brynów-Osiedle Zgrzebnioka and Załęska Hałda-Brynów to the south, and Załęże and Dąb to the west.

The district's boundaries are:

- to the north – along Chorzowska Street from the intersection with W. F. Grundmann Street to Jerzy Ziętek Square (which the border surrounds from the south), continuing along Walenty Roździeński Avenue to the intersection with Jerzy Duda-Gracz Street,
- to the east – parallel to the west of J. Duda-Gracz Street and Graniczna Street to the intersection with Przemysłowa Street; then the border follows Konstanty Damrot and Polna streets to the junction with the A4 motorway (Górnośląska Avenue),
- to the south – along the A4 motorway (Górnośląska Avenue) to the intersection with the railway tracks running towards the Katowice Ligota railway station,
- to the west – along the Katowice–Brynów railway (west of the former locomotive depot complex); at Kamienna Street, the boundary turns north along M. Goeppert-Mayer Street and the western part of W. F. Grundmann Street to the intersection with Chorzowska Street and Jan Nepomucen Stęślicki Street.

According to Jerzy Kondracki's physical-geographical division, Śródmieście is located within the Katowice Upland mesoregion, which is a part of the geographic region of Silesian Upland. In terms of historical geography, Śródmieście is located in the eastern part of Upper Silesia.

=== Geology and terrain ===
Śródmieście is located within the Upper Silesian Basin. The rocks filling it originated during the Upper Carboniferous period and consist of shales, sandstones, and conglomerates that contain deposits of bituminous coal. These formations form the bedrock of Śródmieście, as well as the surface of the southern part of the district, located east of Mikołowska Street and further south of the railway tracks. Outcrops of the Orzesze layers (Westphalian B) are present in this area. They consist of massive series of mainly shales with sandstones, siderites, and coal seams. The thickness of this series exceeds 900 m.

The main features of Śródmieście's terrain were formed during the Tertiary period through intensive chemical weathering and denudation. During the Quaternary period, the Śródmieście area was likely covered by the Scandinavian ice sheet twice: during the oldest Mindel glaciation and during the Riss glaciation. The sediments from the first glaciation were mostly removed during the interglacial, while the ice sheet of the Riss glaciation left behind tills along valley depressions. During the Holocene, Pleistocene sediments were destroyed and cleared away, and a low terrace formed in several stages in the river valleys. There are no formations from the Tertiary period in Śródmieście; instead, a significant part of the district is covered by Quaternary formations. These mainly consist of glacial and fluvioglacial sands and gravels from the Pleistocene, while the Rawa river valley and the trough along the border between Śródmieście and Załęże are composed of Holocene river sediments.

According to morphological units, Śródmieście is divided into two parts. The lower, northern part of Śródmieście is part of the Rawa Depression, which stretches along the valley of the Rawa river. It is deeply cut into the Carboniferous formations and forms the bottom of the valley together with the Pleistocene terrace. This is also the lowest point – the water level of the Rawa river at Jerzy Duda-Gracz Street is approximately 260 meters above sea level. The area of the district rises towards the south. This part of the district also encompasses the eastern edges of the Kochłowice Hills, which are characterized by flattened elevations. The highest point in Śródmieście is located near the Voivodeship Office Building, where the elevation above sea level exceeds 300 meters. The difference in height between the extreme points is about 40 meters. The terrain of Śródmieście has been heavily influenced by human activity related to urbanization and mining. Almost the entire area of Śródmieście consists of an anthropogenic surface of levelled land.

=== Climate and topoclimate ===
The climatic conditions of Śródmieście are similar to those of Katowice as a whole. They are shaped by both climatic and local factors. The climate of the district is mainly modified by oceanic influences, which prevail over continental influences, and sporadic tropical air masses arriving in the area from the southwest through the Moravian Gate.

The average annual temperature for the period of 1961–2005, based on data from the station in Muchowiec near Śródmieście, was 8.1 °C. The warmest month in the studied period was July (17.8 °C), and the coldest was January (−2.2 °C). The average annual sunshine duration between 1966 and 2005 was 1,474 hours, while the average cloud cover in the same period was 5.3. The average annual precipitation between 1951 and 2005 was 713.8 mm. The average duration of snow cover is 60–70 days, and the growing season lasts an average 200–220 days. Throughout the year, westerly and southwesterly winds prevail (20.7% and 20.4% of all winds, respectively), while winds from the north are the least frequent (5.7%). The average wind speed was 2.4 m/s.

The climate of Śródmieście is modified by local factors (topoclimate), depending on the land cover and proximity to river valleys. The topoclimate of areas located directly along the Rawa river is the most unfavorable. There is frequent heat radiation, and the high moisture levels cause significant evaporation, which draws heat. In densely built-up areas, the local climate is influenced by the warming of the atmosphere as a result of human activity. High concentrations of buildings, roads, and squares cause an increase in air temperature in the ground layer of the atmosphere. These areas also lose heat more quickly due to radiation at night, and a lack of moisture in the air prevents prolonged heat retention.

=== Surface and groundwater ===
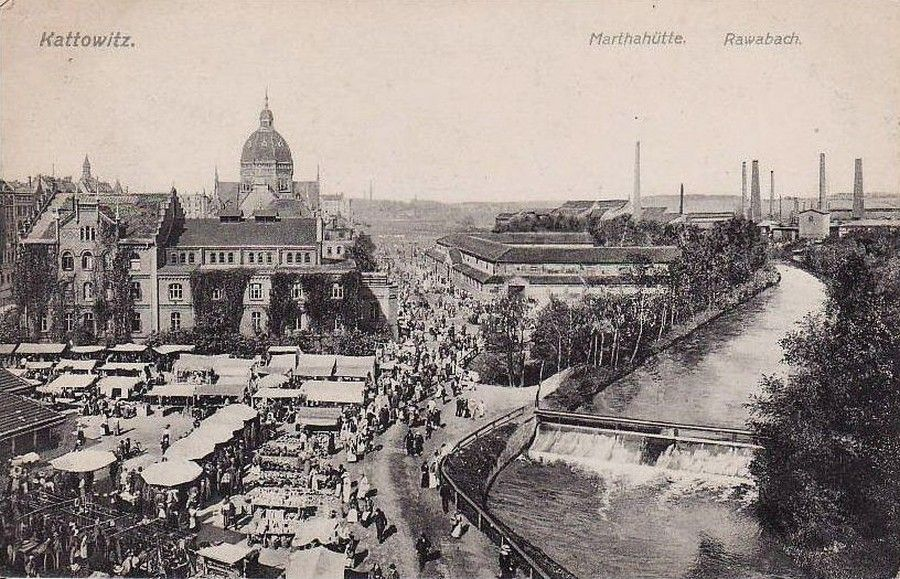
Area of present-day Piotr Skarga Street at the beginning of the 20th century; on the right side, the Rawa river intersected by weirs

The entire area of Śródmieście is located in the left basin of the Vistula river, almost entirely within the drainage basin of the Rawa. This river, a tributary of the Czarna Przemsza, flows from west to east through the district. Its course is fully regulated and embanked, and a large part of it within the Śródmieście area is covered. It is a recipient of treated and raw wastewater and meteoric water. In the mid-19th century, the Rawa was an exceptionally clean river, with a lot of fish and crayfish habitats. It was divided by numerous weirs, which formed cascades. In present-day Śródmieście, there was a large pond with an area of about 40 hectares, which stretched along today's Adam Mickiewicz Street and Stanisław Moniuszko Street. These reservoirs were built for fish farming and to drive water wheels; the Bogucice forge, among others, used the cascades on the Rawa. By the end of the 19th century, the river had become significantly polluted. At the turn of the 19th and 20th centuries, 60% of Rawa's waters consisted of sewage and post-mining waters. In the mid-1960s, the river was covered.

A small southeastern part of Śródmieście, located east of Henryk Sienkiewicz Street and south of Powstańców Street, is located within the drainage basin of the Leśny Stream. A fifth-order drainage divide separtes the Rawa and Leśny Stream basins. Currently, there are no water reservoirs in Śródmieście.

According to Bronisław Paczyński's classification, Śródmieście is located within the Silesian-Kraków hydrogeological region, in the Upper Silesian subregion. Aquifers occur across all layers, but their importance depends on several factors. According to the division of Poland into Uniform Groundwater Areas, the entire district is located within Uniform Groundwater Area No. 111 (Central Vistula Uplands Subregion).

=== Nature and environmental protection ===
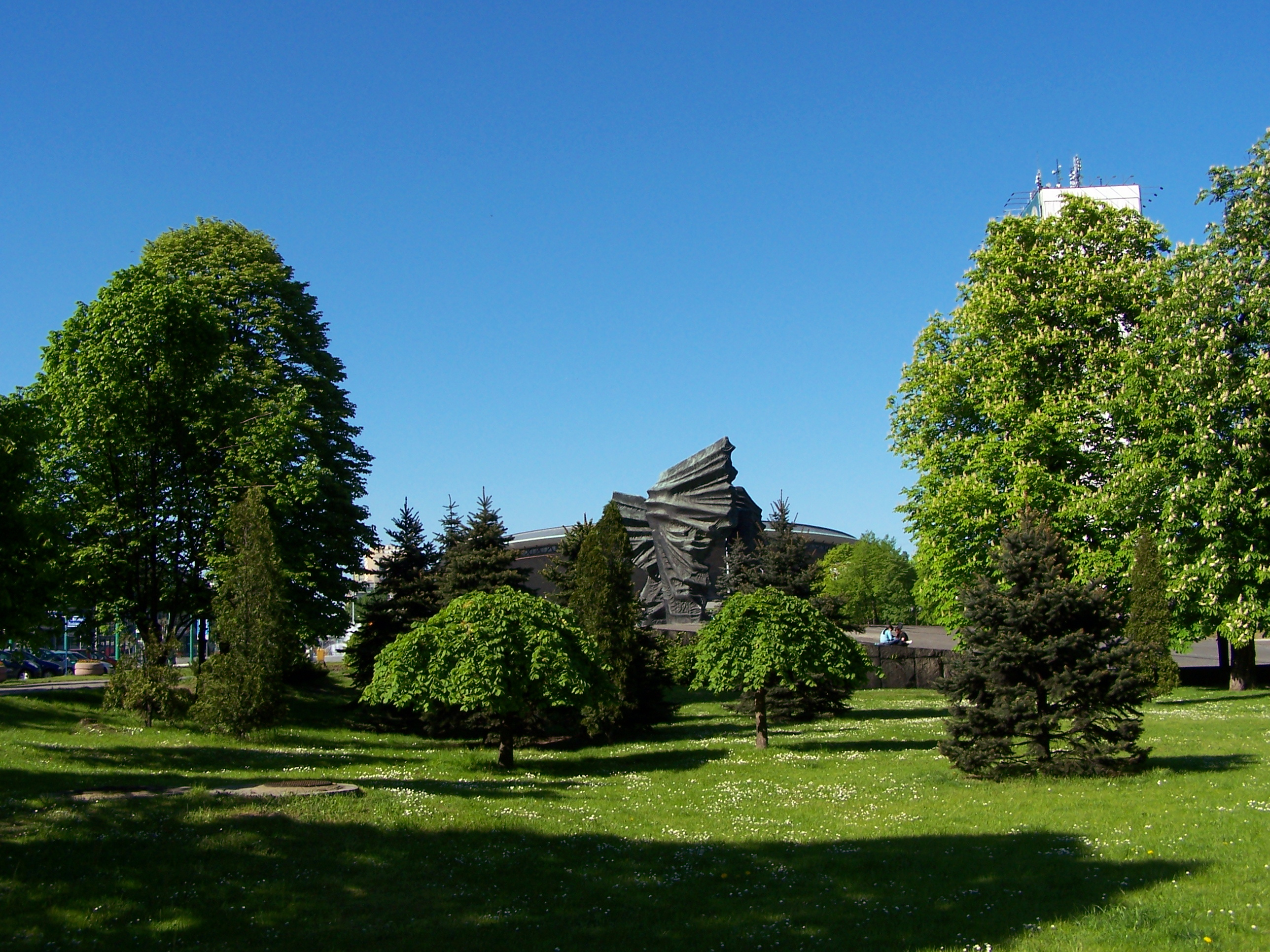
Fragment of Silesian Insurgents' Park in May 2008

The natural vegetation of today's Śródmieście was shaped during the last glaciation 12,000–16,000 years ago. Over the last 200 years, it has been subjected to strong anthropogenic pressure. Originally, the areas along the Rawa river valley were covered with riparian forests and alder carrs, while pine and beech forests grew in the higher areas. The development of dense downtown infrastructure in the 19th and 20th centuries led to the almost complete disappearance of natural elements. According to a study from 1859, the following green areas were located in Śródmieście: the Large City Pond, the park next to the castle, the park next to the Evangelical church, and agricultural lands in the southern part of the city. Ruderal species, among others, developed in urbanized habitats. Conditions were also created for the development of synanthropic animals, the most important of which are birds, including those that have long accompanied humans, such as the house sparrow and pigeon, as well as native birds that have adapted to urban conditions, including swifts, house martins, and barn swallows.

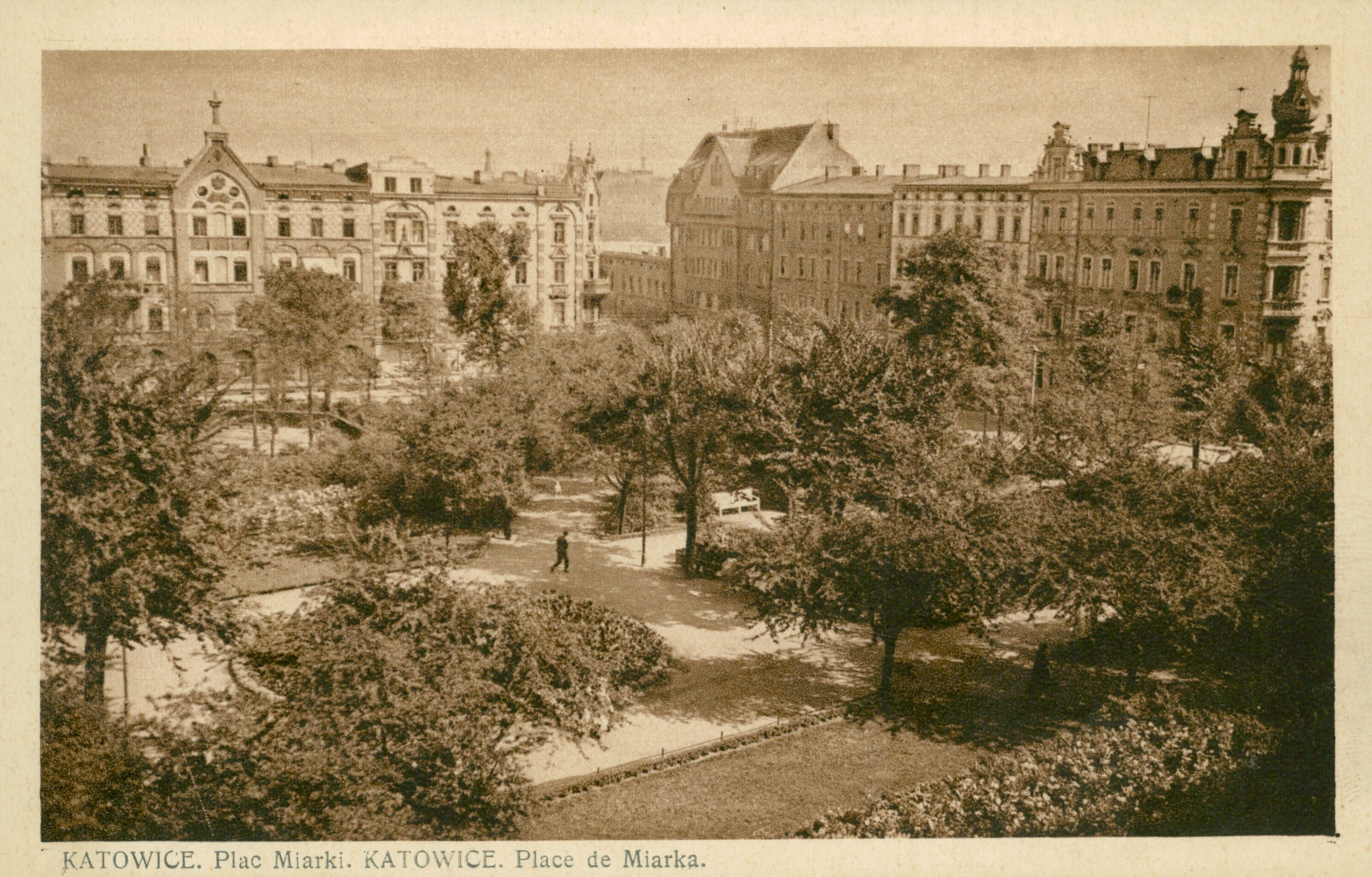
Fragment of Karol Miarka Square between 1927 and 1929

In the current natural structure of Śródmieście as a place of dense, older buildings, greenery mainly exists as street plantings, courtyards, squares, parks, cemeteries, and church grounds. These areas form green islands of various sizes, which are separated by barriers in the form of dense buildings. The Rawa river, on the other hand, serves as a wildlife corridor in Śródmieście. The area of green space for recreational purposes in Śródmieście is 17.7 ha, family allotments occupy 5.45 ha of the district, district parks 4.59 ha, and there are 13.11 ha of squares and green areas. The first park established in the district was the park next to the castle, on the site of today's Silesian Insurgents' Park. Other parks and squares developed at the turn of the 19th and 20th centuries in Śródmieście include the Freedom Square and Karol Miarka Square. Before World War I, there was also a tree-lined square with a playground between the Great Synagogue and the Municipal Baths; the Ślązak department store was built there during the Polish People's Republic era.

There are two groups of family allotment gardens within the boundaries of Śródmieście:

No.	Name	Location	Area (ha)	Number of plots (2007)
1	Kościuszki	Barbary Street	4.68	140
2	Rymera	Rybnicka Street	0.76	30

== History ==
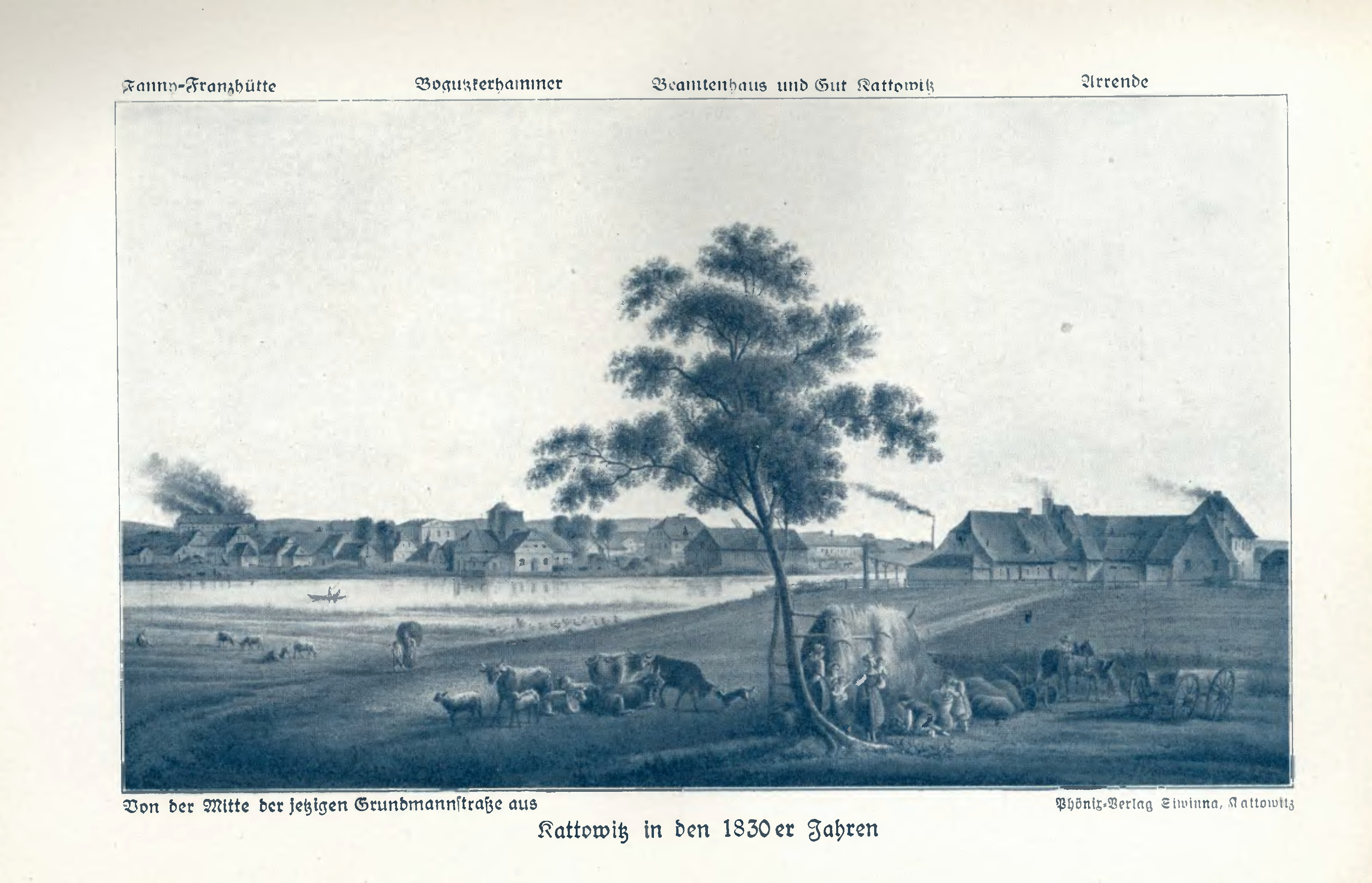
Lithograph by Ernest Knippel depicting Katowice in the 1830s; on the right side is the Katowice Inn

The first settlement in what is now Śródmieście is associated with the industrial settlement of Kuźnica Bogucka, located between Roździanka (Rawa), its right tributary, Osiek, and Kłodnica. The first mention of Kuźnica Bogucka's activities appeared in 1397, and by the 15th century, it had separated from Bogucice. At the end of the 16th century, blacksmith Andrzej Bogucki founded the village of Katowice on lands belonging to Kuźnica Bogucka, where several farmers settled. Katowice was first mentioned in 1598 as "villa nova Katowicze" in a lease agreement which noted a manor farm and that four farmers and two cottagers lived in the village. The name "Katowice" is first mentioned in a document from 1614, and until the end of the 18th century, the names Katowice and Kuźnica Bogucka were used interchangeably.

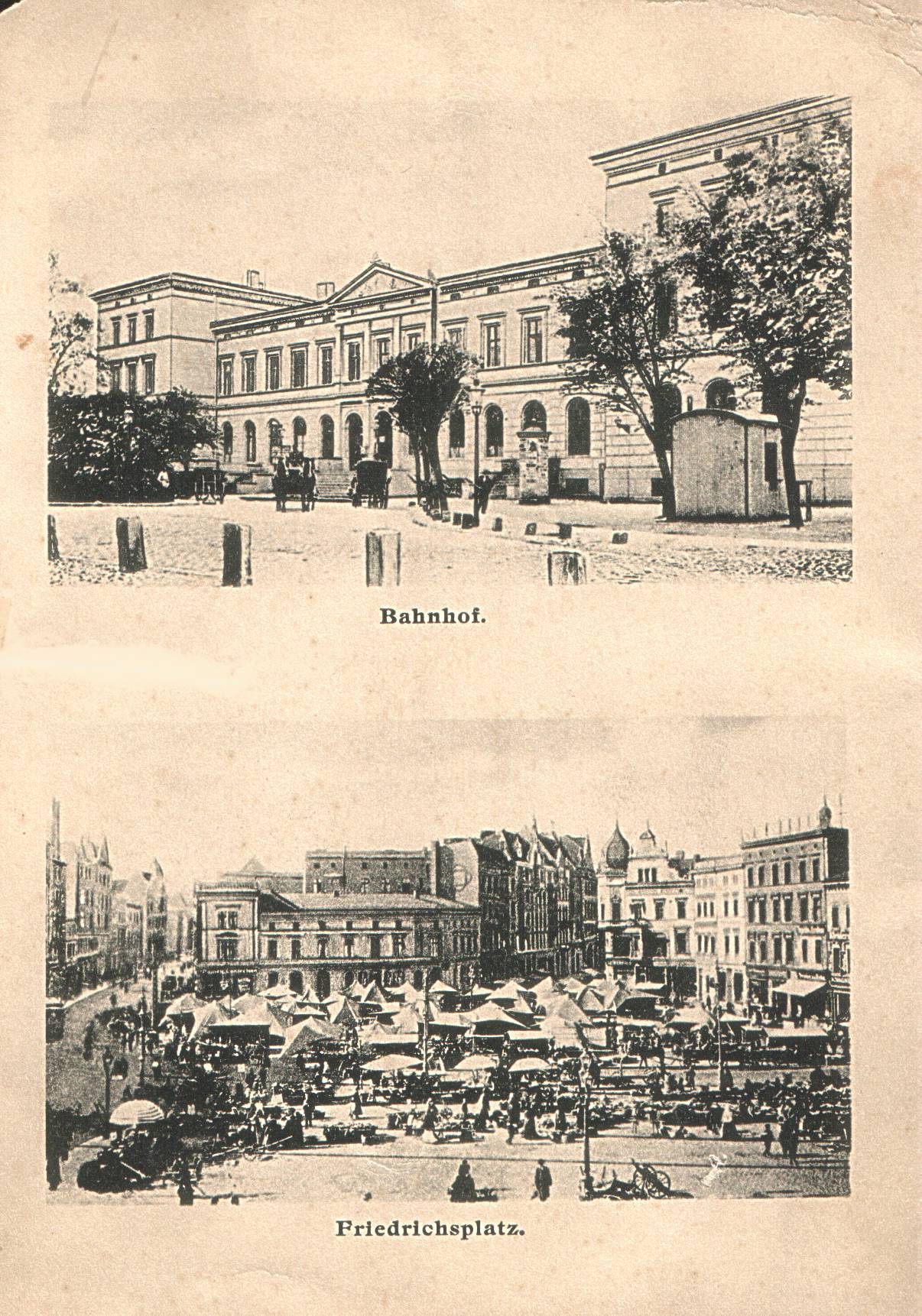
Pre-war postcard depicting the former railway station building (top, before expansion) and Katowice Market Square (bottom)

In 1702, the estate of Kuźnica Bogucka was acquired by Baltazar Erdman Promnitz for 15,000 guldens. Kuźnica Bogucka, Katowice, and Brwinów were later repurchased by Jan Krzysztof Mieroszewski, starosta and land judge of the Duchy of Siewierz, the first fee tail of Mysłowice. In the 18th century, Katowice was an agricultural settlement inhabited by a dozen or so peasants and was closely linked to Kuźnica Bogucka. The village's distance from transport routes and its location in barren, wooded areas meant that Katowice developed very slowly – in 1799, it had 78 farms, and in the 1820s, 142 farms. In 1827, the first school in Katowice was established in a building located between today's Młyńska Street and Pocztowa Street.

The dynamic development and intensive urbanization of contemporary Śródmieście was caused by fast development of industry in Upper Silesia. Three economic sectors developed mainly in the vicinity of today's district: coal mining, zinc smelting, and iron smelting. In 1839, Franz von Winckler purchased Katowice along with the Mysłowice estates. Shortly thereafter, he moved the general management of his properties there from Miechowice and made efforts to route the planned railway through Katowice. In 1858, this management was changed into a mining directorate, becoming the first industrial administrative body in today's Śródmieście. On 3 October 1846, the Upper Silesian Railway (German: Oberschlesische Eisenbahn AG) launched a railway running through Katowice, connecting Wrocław with Mysłowice; the first passenger train to Katowice arrived on 6 August 1847.

In 1846, serfdom was abolished on the Winckler family estate, and manor lands were subdivided. In the second half of the 19th century, these plots were mainly purchased by German and Jewish settlers, political and cultural associations, and the Katowice municipal authorities. In the 1850s, the Marta Steelworks (German: Marthahütte) was launched in what is now Śródmieście, operating as a zinc rolling mill until 1929. From 1856, the Jakub Steelworks (German: Jacobhütte) also operated on present-day Stawowa Street. With the development of industry, the roads leading to Katowice were expanded, including the route connecting Tarnowskie Góry and Mysłowice through Wełnowiec and Katowice in 1836.

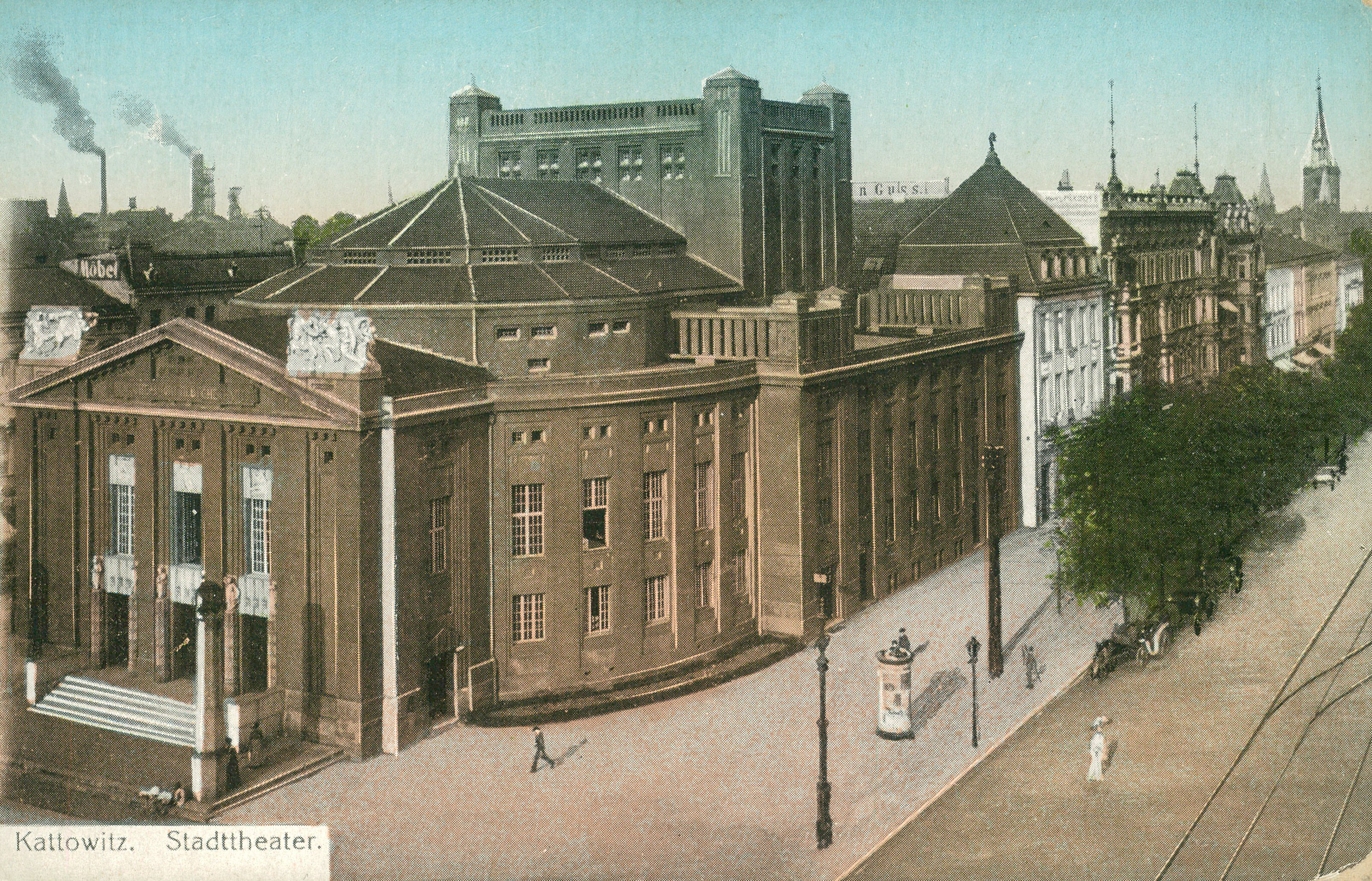
Postcard issued after 1907 depicting a section of Warszawska Street; in the foreground is the building of the former Municipal Theatre – now the Silesian Theatre

The population grew quickly, especially in non-agricultural industries, which increased efforts to transform Katowice into a city. Friedrich Grundmann, chief director of Thiele-Winckler's estates, and the physician Richard Holtze made significant contributions in this process. Their efforts were realized on 11 September 1865, when a document granting Katowice town privileges was signed. During this period, many public and other buildings were erected in the present-day Śródmieście – between 1869 and 1872, a total of 182 residential houses were built in Katowice at that time. The city was developing in the area from Freedom Square to the Market Square and further towards Zawodzie. At the end of the 19th century, the compact urban development crossed the railway tracks in the south. The city became a headquarters for numerous economic and administrative organizations, including the Upper Silesian Coal Convention, the State Postal Directorate (in 1872), the District Court (in 1882), the Upper Silesian Association of Mining and Metallurgical Industrialists, and the Directorate of the Prussian Royal State Railways (in 1895). The first tram reached the Market Square on 25 November 1898, and in 1907, the Municipal Theatre was established (now the Silesian Theatre).

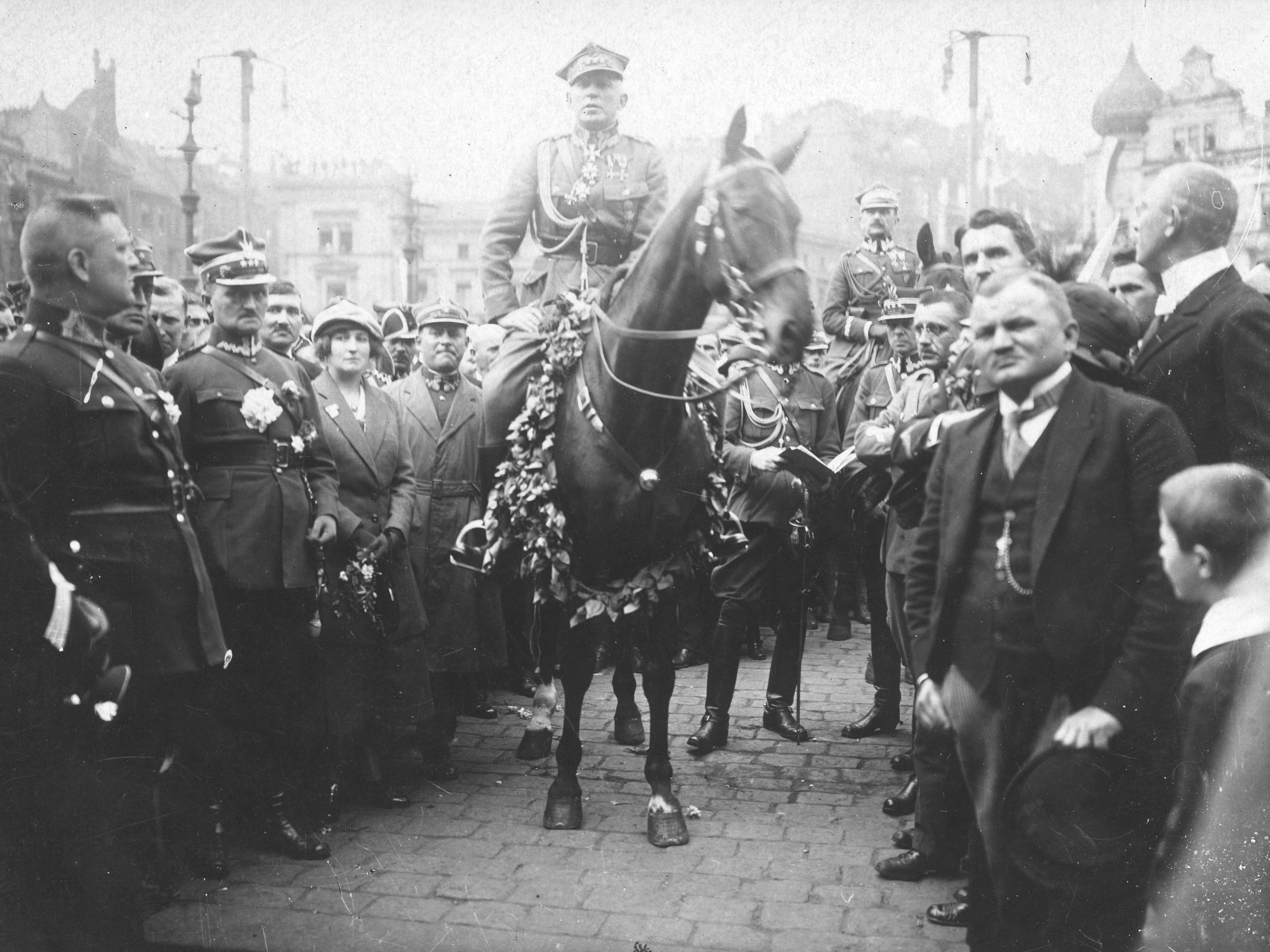
Ceremony marking the entry of the Polish Armed Forces, led by Gen. Stanisław Szeptycki, into Katowice on 22 June 1922; the photograph was taken at the Market Square

During the Silesian Uprisings and the plebiscite, Śródmieście was the site of many events, including demonstrations and the destruction of plebiscite activists' premises. On 17 August 1920, Andrzej Mielęcki was murdered, and during the Second Silesian Uprising, the city was blockaded by insurgents. On 20 June 1922, the Polish Armed Forces entered the city and were welcomed at the border between Katowice and Zawodzie by Mayor Alfons Górnik. In the interwar period, Katowice became the capital of the autonomous Silesian Voivodeship. In addition to the voivodeship authorities, the contemporary Śródmieście was home to the Silesian Parliament, the Higher Mining Office, and consulates of various countries. The development of the district during this period was concentrated in its southern part, where buildings were constructed mainly in the modern style.

During World War II, in the first days after the Germans occupied Katowice in early September 1939, a massacre occurred in the Market Square area, where Nikodem Renc and Konstanty Woźniczka, among others, were shot. The city was incorporated directly into the Third Reich, and became the seat of the Katowice Regency. On 27 January 1945, it was occupied by the 1st Ukrainian Front of the Red Army with virtually no damage. In the following days, a few houses in the very center of Śródmieście (in the Market Square area) burned down, set on fire during looting by Soviet soldiers.

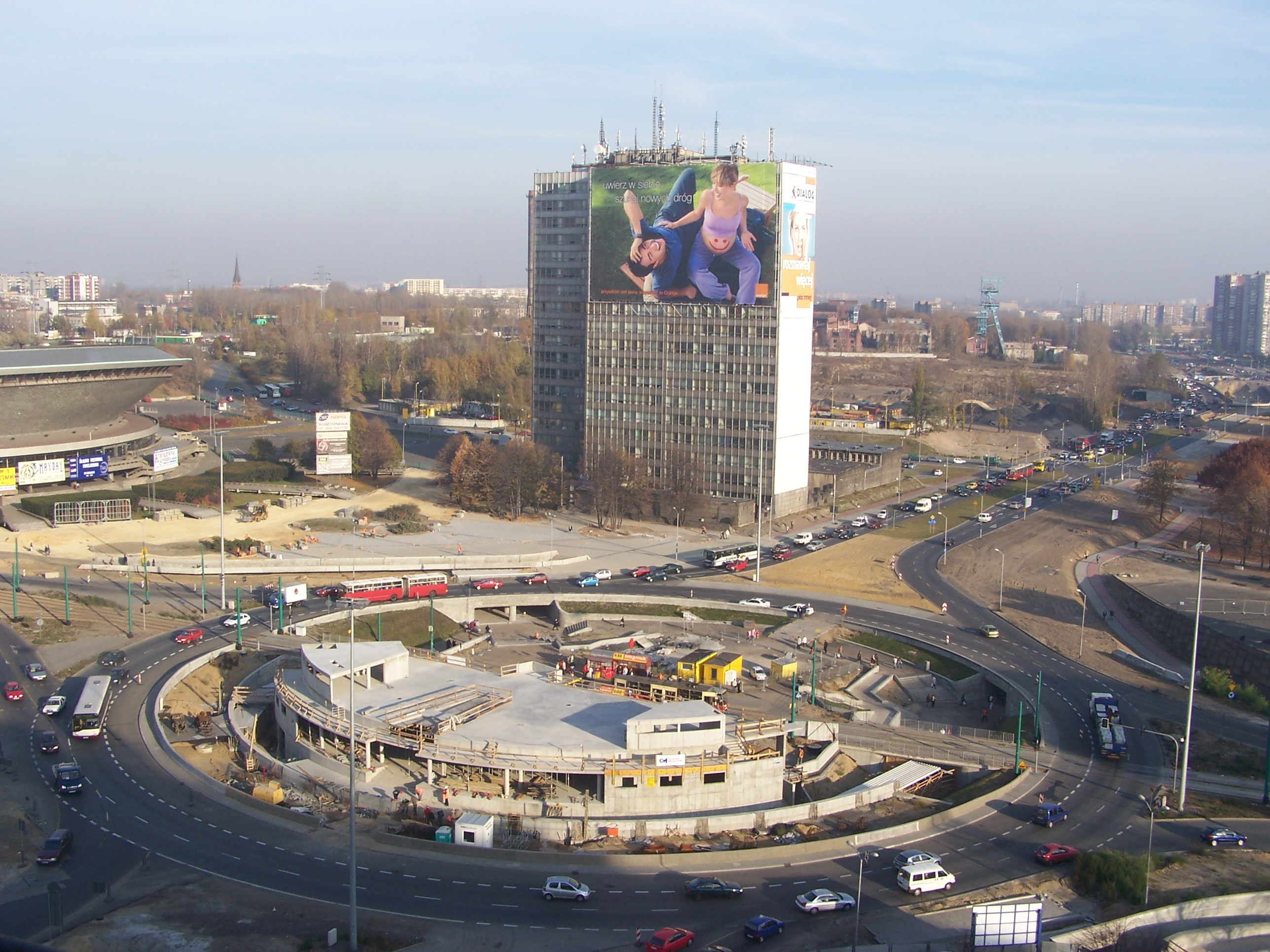
Construction of Drogowa Trasa Średnicowa, including the construction of a tunnel on the border between Bogucice, Koszutka, and Śródmieście in November 2005

During the Polish People's Republic era, the central part of Śródmieście was transformed. A decision made by political and administrative authorities in 1959 led to the construction of the so-called "Western Block", and between 1962 and 1965, a spatial development plan for Śródmieście was established. In the area of Wojciech Korfanty Avenue and the Market Square, buildings such as Superjednostka, Separator office building, the Silesia Hotel, and the Katowice Hotel were constructed. Between 1965 and 1972, a new railway station was built in the area between Młyńska Street, Stawowa Street, and 3 Maja Street. In 1968, the University of Silesia began operating in Śródmieście, and two years later, the Academy of Physical Education. In November 1980, the Higher Silesian Theological Seminary was moved to the district, and a year later, the Social Museum of the History of the City of Katowice was changed into the Museum of the History of Katowice. In 1984, the Silesian Museum was opened.

At the time of the political changes in 1989, Śródmieście was a district with many problems, including damage to infrastructure and buildings caused by coal mining under the city and a lack of cultural offerings. In the 1990s, a new vision for the development of the entire city was introduced, with attention also paid to its heritage – a number of new monuments and plaques commemorating people important to Katowice were unveiled in Śródmieście, including the monument to Wojciech Korfanty on the Silesian Parliament Square. In June 2004, W. F. Grundman Street was opened, and in December 2006, work was completed on the construction of the downtown section of Drogowa Trasa Średnicowa along with the reconstruction of Jerzy Ziętek Square. This investment was one of the largest and most important investment projects in the history of Katowice. After 1989, the higher education sector also developed. In 1993, the first private university in Katowice was established – the General Jerzy Ziętek Silesian School of Management. Existing public universities were also developed, and the cultural offer of the district was expanded, with a number of cultural events organized in Śródmieście.

== Demography ==
Structure of gender and age of Śródmieście population (as of 31 December 2015)
Period/ Population	Pre-working age (0–18 years)	Working age (18-60/65 years)	Post-working age (over 60/65 years)	Total
Total	4,093	17,916	6,784	28,793
women	1,981	8,614	4,743	15,338
men	2,112	9,302	2,041	13,455
Feminization ratio	94	93	232	114

In December 2007, Śródmieście had a population of 35,927, which accounted for 11.4% of the city's inhabitants at that time. It was the most populous district of Katowice at the time. The population density was 9,427 people/km², making it the second most densely populated district of the city after Osiedle Tysiąclecia. In 2010, 33,035 people lived in Śródmieście (10.8% of the city's total population), and at the end of 2011, 32,131 people. Two years later, in 2013, 30,336 people lived in Śródmieście. At the end of 2020, it was the second most populous district of Katowice, after Ligota-Panewniki, with a population of 25,320.

Between 1988 and 2007, there was a significant decline in the number of residents in Śródmieście. This decrease was the largest of all districts of Katowice, reaching approximately 11,500 people, or over 25% of the population as of 1988. Several factors contributed to this situation, including natural decline related to the high percentage of people of post-working age, the replacement of apartments with service functions, and a shortage of parking spaces.

In 2010, 15.1% of Śródmieście residents were of pre-working age, 63.1% were of working age, and 21.1% were of post-working age. In 2013, Śródmieście had the highest number of residents over the age of 75 among all districts of the city – 3,322 people (11% of the total population of the city).

Sources: 1988; 1997; 2005; 2010; 2015; 2020

== Politics and administration ==
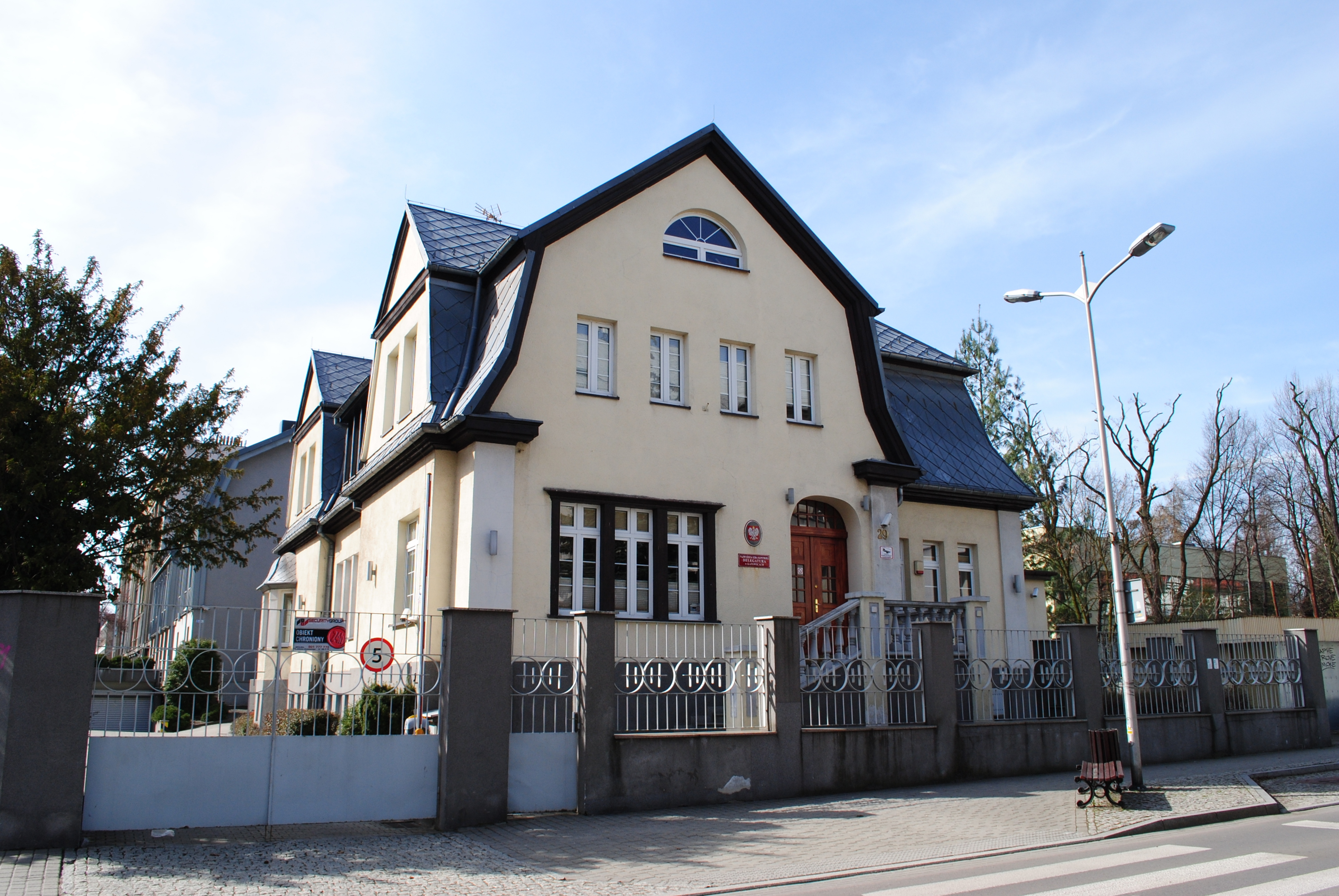
Headquarters of the Supreme Audit Office (29 Powstańców Street)

Śródmieście is a district where government and local government offices, as well as the headquarters of non-integrated and state administration bodies, are concentrated, including, among others:

- Katowice City Hall (4 Młyńska Street),
- Metropolitan Office of Metropolis GZM (21a Barbary Street),
- Silesian Voivodeship Office (25 Jagiellońska Street),
- Marshal's Office of the Silesian Voivodeship (46 Juliusz Ligoń Street),
- Katowice Branch of the Supreme Audit Office (29 Powstańców Street),
- Office of the Regional Representative of the Commissioner for Human Rights.

The district is also the headquarters of the judiciary, including:

- Regional Court (38 Francuska Street; 16/18 Andrzeja Street),
- Katowice-West District Court (10 Freedom Square and 45 Warszawska Street),
- Katowice-East District Court (one of two headquarters – 14 Józef Lompa Street).

The regional authorities of numerous non-governmental organizations and consular offices are also concentrated in Śródmieście. The following countries have consulates there: Belarus (29 Graniczna Street), Kazakhstan (24/2 Jagiellońska Street), Lithuania (2 John III Sobieski Street), Luxembourg (4 Wawelska Street), Peru (17 Paweł Stalmach Street), Slovenia (15 Opolska Street), and Ukraine (4/4 Nicolaus Copernicus Street).

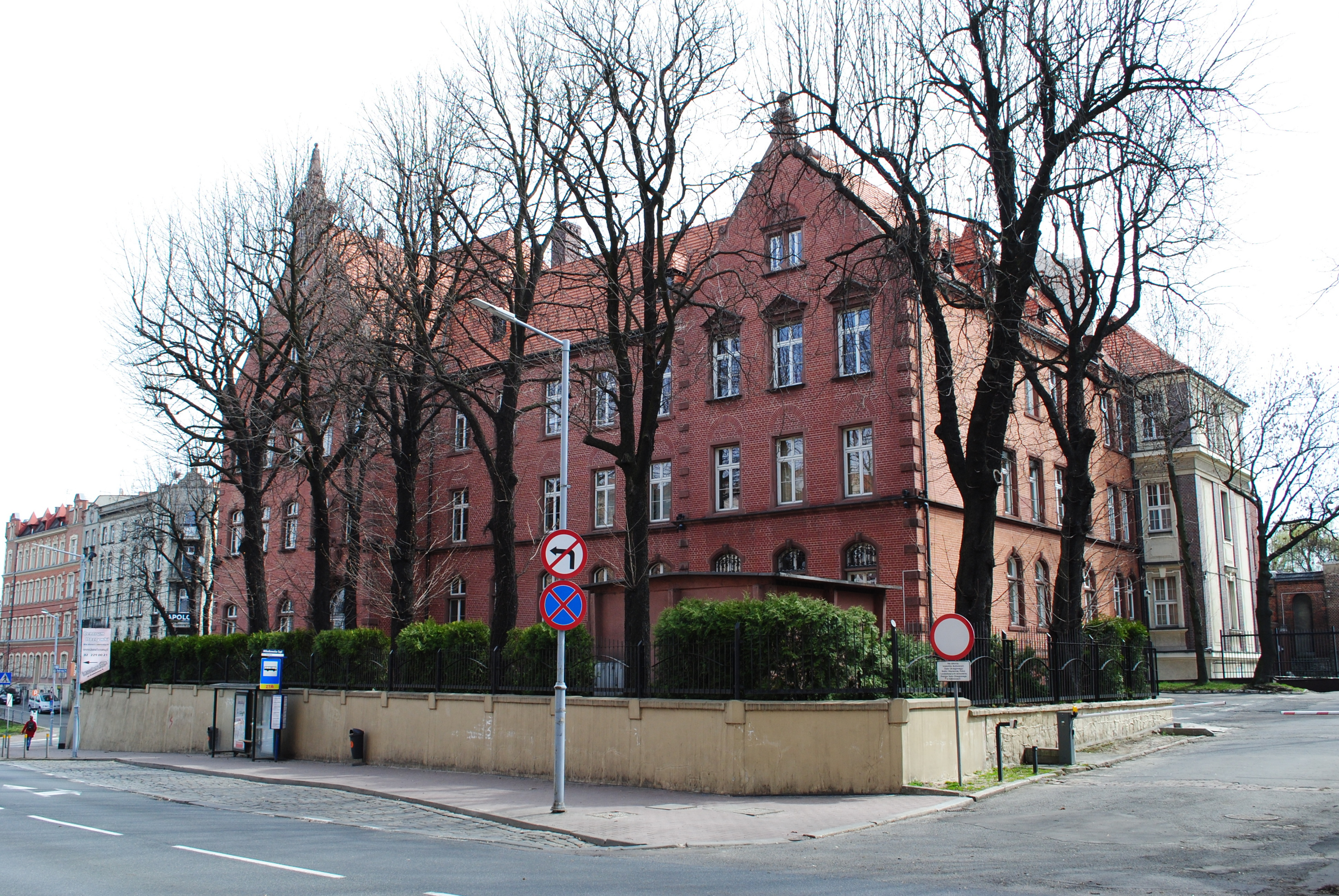
Building of the District Court (16/18 Andrzeja Street)

The development of the administrative functions of present-day Śródmieście began in the first half of the 19th century with the establishment of the Tiele-Winckler mining directorate in Katowice, which managed the industry in the Bytom district. In the 1860s, the directorate employed about 100 officials. The administrative functions of contemporary Śródmieście were strengthened in 1873, when Katowice County was separated from Bytom County, becoming a county town. The city's growing importance led to the development of administrative and managerial functions coordinating the economic life of the region. Over time, many headquarters of corporations, joint-stock companies, and industrial associations were located in today's Śródmieście. In 1889, the Katowice Joint-Stock Company for Mining and Metallurgy was established, playing a major role in the economic development of Upper Silesia. A district court was established in 1872 on present-day Mikołowska Street, with a prison built next to it.

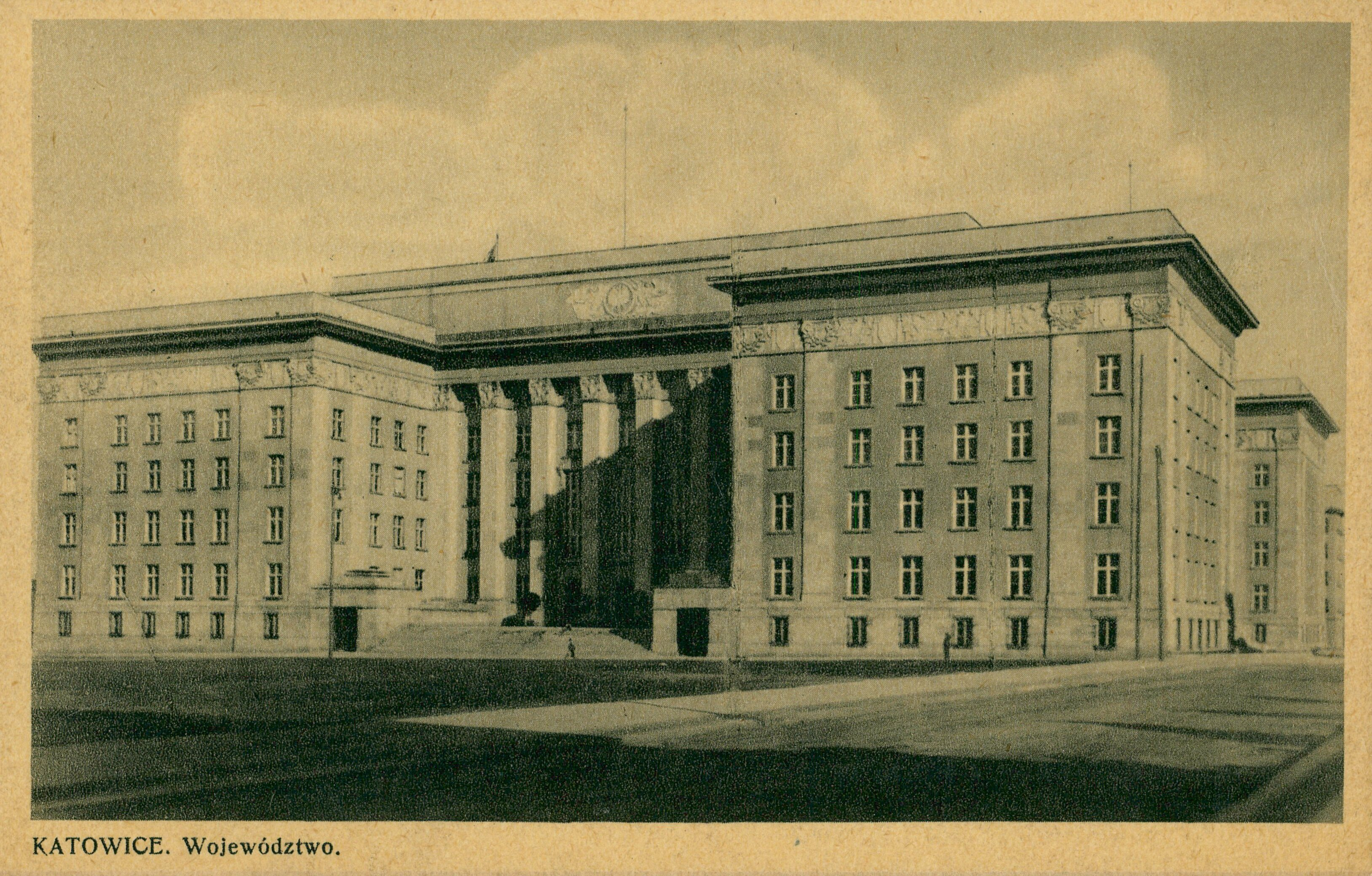
Silesian Parliament Building in 1938 from Silesian Parliament Square

Katowice was incorporated into Poland in 1922, and the city became the capital of the autonomous Silesian Voivodeship. This led to the establishment of state and political administrative decision-making bodies in today's Śródmieście, including the seat of the Silesian Parliament, the Voivodeship Office, and the Voivodeship Council. The headquarters of other authorities and administrations of various levels were also located there, including the District Court, the Tax Office, and the Higher Mining Office.

During the Polska Ludowa period, Śródmieście remained an administrative center, but its form changed as economic administration offices were transformed into state industrial unions or nationwide economic administration units of the ministry. The political and administrative functions of Śródmieście were largely reduced; there was no need to create an autonomous province, and the main legislative body, the Silesian Parliament, was dissolved. During this period, there were several diplomatic missions, including the Consulate General of Czechoslovakia, the Political and Trade Department of the East German Embassy, and the Office of the Trade Advisor of the Hungarian People's Republic.

District Council No. 1 Śródmieście, elected by the residents, operates in the district as a local government community. Its purpose is to create conditions for the full participation of residents in addressing important matters related to the current problems of the district. Council sessions and office hours are held according to a set schedule. The Council and Management Board of District No. 1 Śródmieście operate under the by-law adopted on 25 November 2021 by the Katowice City Council. The council consists of 21 councilors elected for a 5-year term, while the board consists of a chairperson, vice-chairperson, and secretary. The headquarters of the council and board are located at 17 J. Kiliński Street.

On 1 January 1925, the area of Greater Katowice was divided into four districts. At that time, present-day Śródmieście covered the area of district No. I Katowice, where the city administration was also located. During World War II and the occupation of Katowice by the Third Reich, pursuant to a decree issued by the President of the Province of Upper Silesia of 3 February 1942, the existing names of Katowice's districts were abolished. The areas of Śródmieście became part of two districts: Kattowitz-Mitte and Kattowitz-Süd. By the resolution of the Voivodeship National Council of 5 October 1954, Katowice was divided into three districts. Today's Śródmieście was then included in two of them, bordered by Tadeusz Kościuszko Street and present-day Wojciech Korfanty Avenue: No. 1 Bogucice-Zawodzie (eastern part of Śródmieście) and Śródmieście-Załęże (western part). The Presidium of the District National Council of the Śródmieście-Załęże district was first located at present-day 18 W. Korfanty Avenue, and later at 2 Freedom Square. These districts were abolished in 1973.

On 1 January 1992, Katowice was divided into 22 auxiliary local government units and 22 areas of operation. The current Śródmieście was then located within the boundaries of two districts: No. 1 Śródmieście I and No. 2 Śródmieście II. The border between them ran along W. Korfanty Avenue, the Market Square, Pocztowa Street, and Tadeusz Kościuszko Street. On 29 September 1997, the Katowice City Council adopted a new resolution that maintained the existing socio-spatial structure of the city, dividing it into 22 Auxiliary Units of the Katowice City Government. Pursuant to this resolution, Auxiliary Unit No. 1 Śródmieście was also established. On 25 November 2021, a new by-law was adopted, changing, among other things, the name from Auxiliary Unit No. 1 Śródmieście to District No. 1 Śródmieście.

== Economy ==
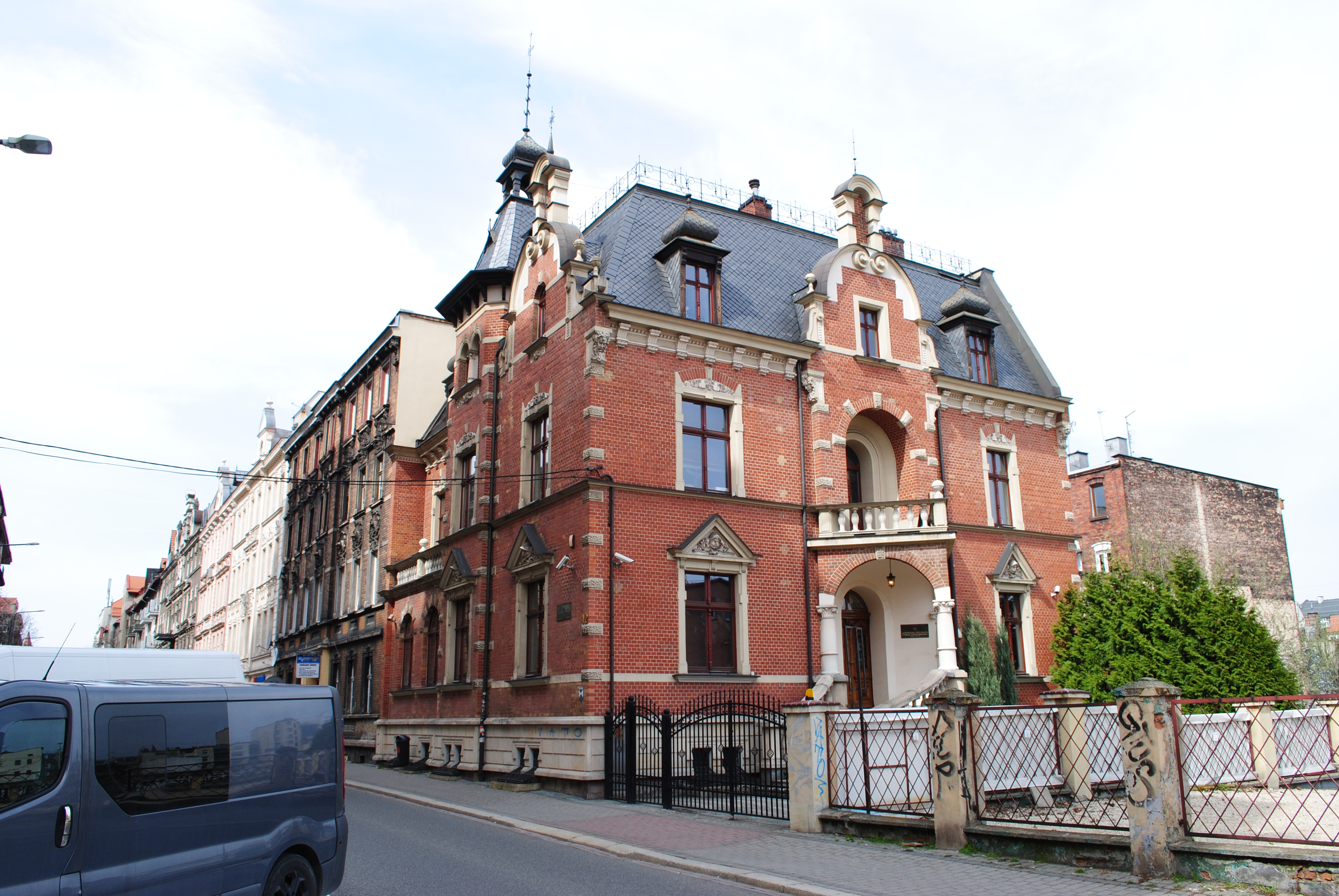
Headquarters of the Katowice Special Economic Zone (42a Wojewódzka Street; building of the former Gerdes Villa)

As the central district of Katowice, Śródmieście is an important economic hub of the city, focusing on services and concentrating functions of municipal, regional, national, and international scope. The most important of these include office, administrative, hotel, cultural, educational (especially universities), commercial, catering, and other functions. Śródmieście is home to the headquarters of many companies, located in high-class office buildings, including:

- Altus (13 Uniwersytecka Street),
- Chorzowska 50 (50 Chorzowska Street),
- Stalexport (29 Adam Mickiewicz Street),
- Global Office Park (A. Mickiewicz Street).

There are also hotels of various standards, such as:

- Monopol Hotel (5 Dworcowa Street),
- Katowice Hotel (9 W. Korfanty Avenue),
- B&B Hotel Katowice Centrum (4 Sokolska Street).

The commercial and gastronomic functions of Śródmieście are concentrated along shopping and pedestrian streets, such as 3 Maja Street, Stawowa Street, and Mariacka Street, as well as in large-scale facilities:

- Galeria Katowicka (30 3 Maja Street),
- Supersam (6a Piotr Skarga Street),
- Skarbek Cooperative Department Store,
- Zenit Cooperative Department Store.

Śródmieście is home to various economic and business institutions, including:

- Katowice Special Economic Zone (42a Wojewódzka Street),
- Chamber of Crafts and Small and Medium Enterprises in Katowice (12 Freedom Square),
- Polish Mining Group (30 Powstańców Street),
- Katowice Regional Branch of the National Bank of Poland (1 Bankowa Street).

On 31 December 2013, there were 11,005 businesses registered in the REGON system operating in Śródmieście, which at that time accounted for 24.1% of all companies in Katowice. Of these, 10,199 were micro-enterprises (336 entities per 1,000 inhabitants). In 2013, a total of 1,316 unemployed people residing in Śródmieście were registered.

== Transport and infrastructure ==
=== Road transport ===
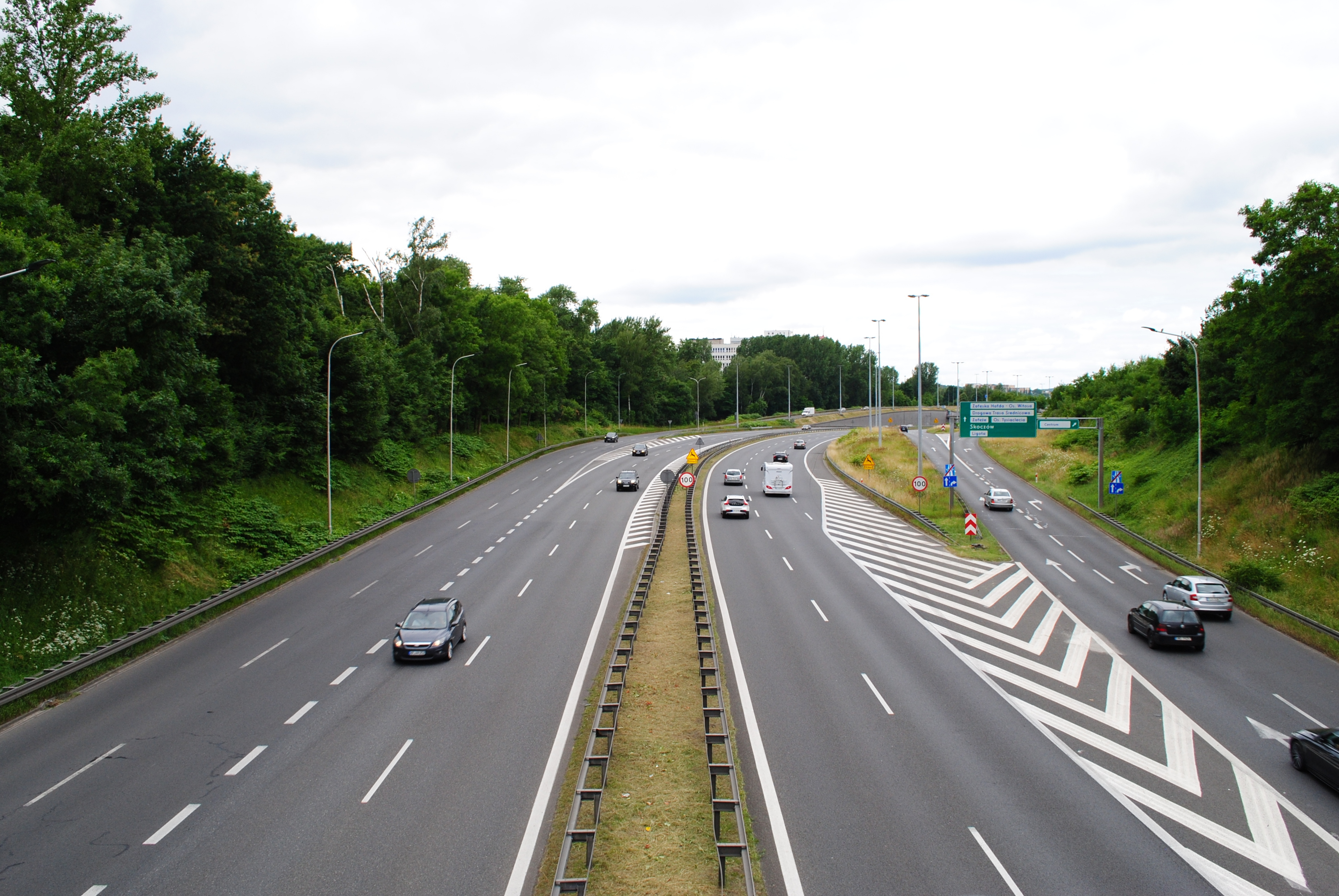
Górnośląska Avenue (section of A4 motorway) at the level of T. Kościuszko Street; view westward

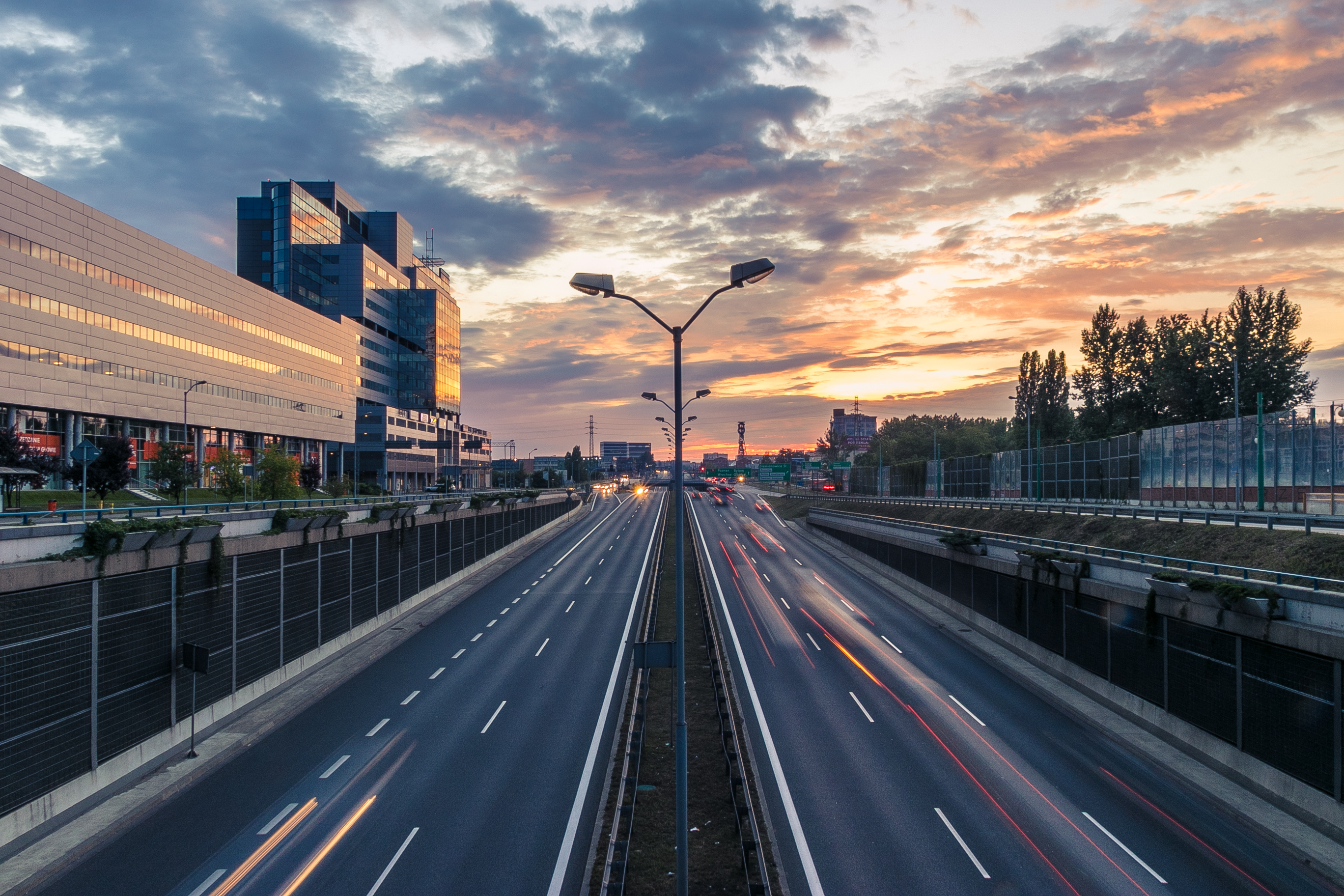
Chorzowska Street (section of Drogowa Trasa Średnicowa) at the level of Sokolska Street; view westward

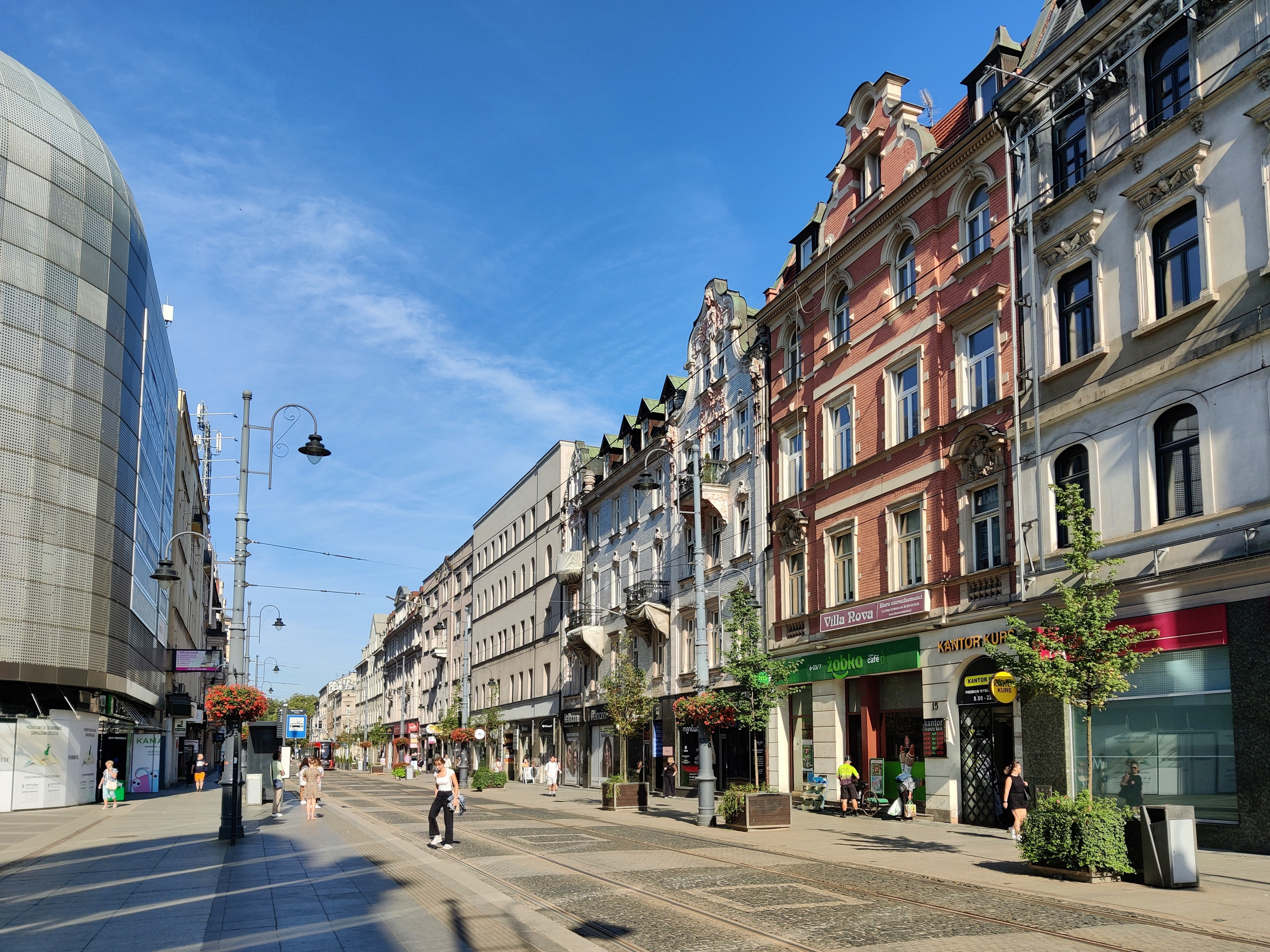
3 Maja Street at the intersection with Stawowa Street; view westward (2024)

Śródmieście has a well-developed road network. Transit roads running parallel to the equator cross the entire city from east to west. The main roads running along the meridian are less prominent. These roads form a framework around Śródmieście and integrate the central part of Katowice with other districts and neighboring cities. These are the following roads:

- A4 motorway (Górnośląska Avenue) – runs parallel to the southern border of Śródmieście. It is a part of the European route E40, providing interregional and international connections to the west (Opole, Wrocław, and further to Germany) and east (Kraków, Rzeszów, and further to Ukraine). In Śródmieście, there is the Katowice Mikołowska junction, where the motorway intersects with Mikołowska Street and Kochłowicka Street. Górnośląska Avenue is one of the most important roads in the city, built in stages. The section between the former Mikołów roundabout and the intersection with Murckowska Street was opened on 24 March 1971, and between 1978 and 1982, the Mikołów roundabout was rebuilt into a road junction. On 10 November 1999, the part between the intersection with Mikołowska Street and Francuska Street, which had been converted into a motorway, was opened to traffic;
- Voivodeship road 902 (Chorzowska Street and Walenty Roździeński Avenue) – expressways, running parallel to the northern border of Śródmieście. Within the district, this route also serves as a compositional axis, but its parameters and noise barriers also make it a spatial barrier for this part of Katowice. In September 2007, the average afternoon rush hour traffic at the intersection with Olimpijska Street was 9,710 vehicles. Between 2001 and 2007, the route was rebuilt and became a part of Drogowa Trasa Średnicowa. Jerzy Ziętek Square was then rebuilt and a 600-meter road tunnel was constructed underneath it.

Other important roads passing through Śródmieście include:

- Wojciech Korfanty Avenue – one of the most important roads in Katowice, running towards Koszutka, Wełnowiec-Józefowiec, and further on to Siemianowice Śląskie. After World War II, as part of the project to transform the city center, it was rebuilt as a dual carriageway with a greenery in the middle. The decision to reconstruct it was made in 1959, and in 1965 a roundabout was built at its intersection with today's Chorzowska Street. In September 2007, the average afternoon rush hour traffic at the intersection with Piastowska Street was 1,702 vehicles;
- Series of streets and squares: Warszawska, Market Square, 3 Maja, Freedom Square – roads forming the axis of Katowice's urban layout. Warszawska Street leads toward Zawodzie and was established as a new route to Katowice from the east. By the 1880s, most of the plots along the street had already been developed, usually with residential villas surrounded by large gardens. The Market Square is the main and oldest city square, where roads originally converged from four directions: northeast to Bogucice, east to Szopienice and Mysłowice, south to Brwinów (later Brynów), and southwest to Mikołów. The first plans to lay out the Market Square date back to 1856, and its construction was completed in 1871. 3 Maja Street is one of the most representative roads in Śródmieście, functioning as a pedestrian zone. It leads towards Załęże and is lined mainly with bourgeois tenements from the second half of the 19th century and the turn of the 19th and 20th centuries;
- Francuska Street – a street located in the eastern part of Śródmieście, connecting the city center with Muchowiec. In September 2007, the average afternoon rush hour traffic at the junction with the A4 motorway was 1,954 vehicles;
- Tadeusz Kościuszko Street – the longest street in Katowice, leading towards Brynów-Osiedle Zgrzebnioka and Piotrowice-Ochojec. Its origins date back to the 18th century as a route connecting Katowice with the Brynów manor. At the turn of the 19th and 20th centuries, dense development began to appear in the downtown part of the street, and in 1912, a tram line was opened along it. The street was modernized between 2013 and 2015;
- Mikołowska Street – one of the main roads leading south from Śródmieście towards Brynów. By the end of the 19th century, dense development had formed along the downtown section of the street. In September 2007, the average afternoon rush hour traffic at the Katowice Mikołowska junction was 2,461 vehicles;
- Sokolska Street – a street located in the western part of Śródmieście, connecting the city center with Koszutka. It was established in the 1860s as one of five streets radiating from Freedom Square. By 1905, the street had been developed. In the 1960s, it was connected to the former K. Liebknecht Street in Osiedle Marchlewskiego, which has been part of Sokolska Street since 1990. In September 2007, the average afternoon rush hour traffic at the intersection with Chorzowska Street was 1,619 vehicles.

Traffic has been removed from some downtown streets, changing them into pedestrian passages with a lot of commercial and service functions. These include Wawelska, Stawowa, Staromiejska, Dyrekcyjna, Dworcowa, Mariacka, Andrzej Mielęcki, and St. Stanisław streets. The problem with Śródmieście's road transport system is congestion due to the high number of motor vehicles, especially during the morning and afternoon rush hours. The heaviest traffic occurs there, especially in the areas of Mikołowska, F. W. Grundmann, W. Roździeński Avenue, Francuska, and T. Kościuszko streets. Traffic congestion is also affected by, among other things, difficult parking conditions, insufficient number of spaces in underground car parks in relation to the scale of traffic, and the lack of a coordinated system of bicycle routes.

=== Railway transport ===
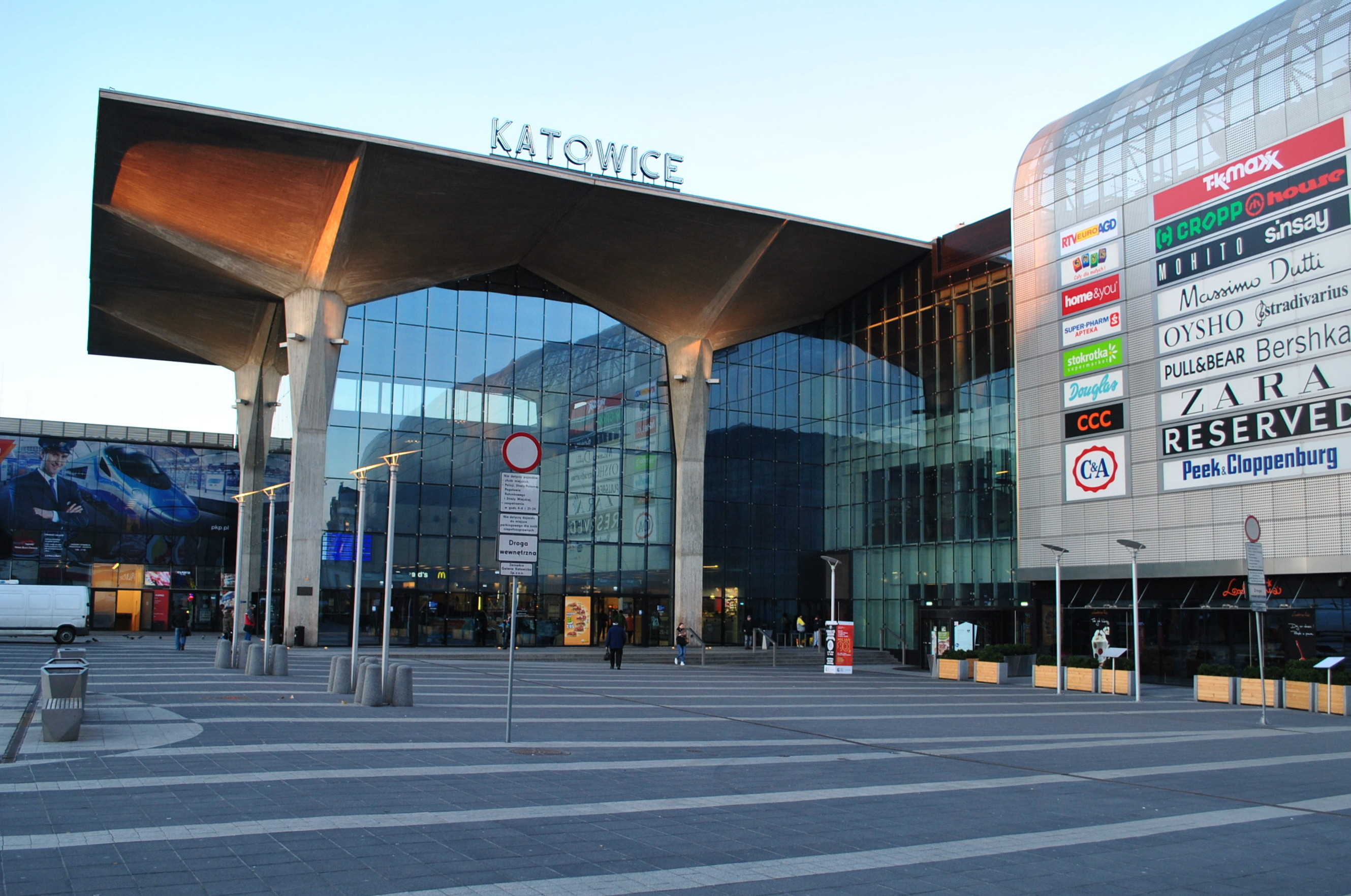
Station building of the Katowice railway station; view from the former W. Szewczyk Square

Within Śródmieście is the largest railway station in the Katowice hub, serving passenger trains of all categories. In 2005, it was used by an average of over 24,000 passengers daily – the most of any station or stop in the Silesian Voivodeship. The main station building is located in the northern part of the station, at the former 2 Wilhelm Szewczyk Square, opened on 29 October 2012. It is the largest station building of Metropolis GZM, which, according to the Polish State Railways categorization, has the highest category, A.

The following railways within Śródmieście connect to the Katowice railway station:

- Warszawa Zachodnia-Katowice line – a main, electrified, double-track railway used for passenger and freight traffic;
- Katowice–Legnica railway – a partially main, first-class, electrified, double-track railway used for passenger and freight traffic;
- Oświęcim–Katowice railway – primary, electrified, double-track railway used for passenger and freight traffic;
- Katowice–Zwardoń railway – partially main, electrified, double-track railway used for passenger and freight traffic;
- Katowice–Brynów railway – local railway;
- Katowice–Chorzów Batory railway – local railway.

These railways are managed by PKP Polskie Linie Kolejowe, with direct supervision handled by the Railway Lines Plant in Sosnowiec. The international E30 railway runs along parts of these lines (Dresden–Katowice–Kyiv) and E65 (Gdynia–Warsaw–Katowice–Vienna–Rijeka).

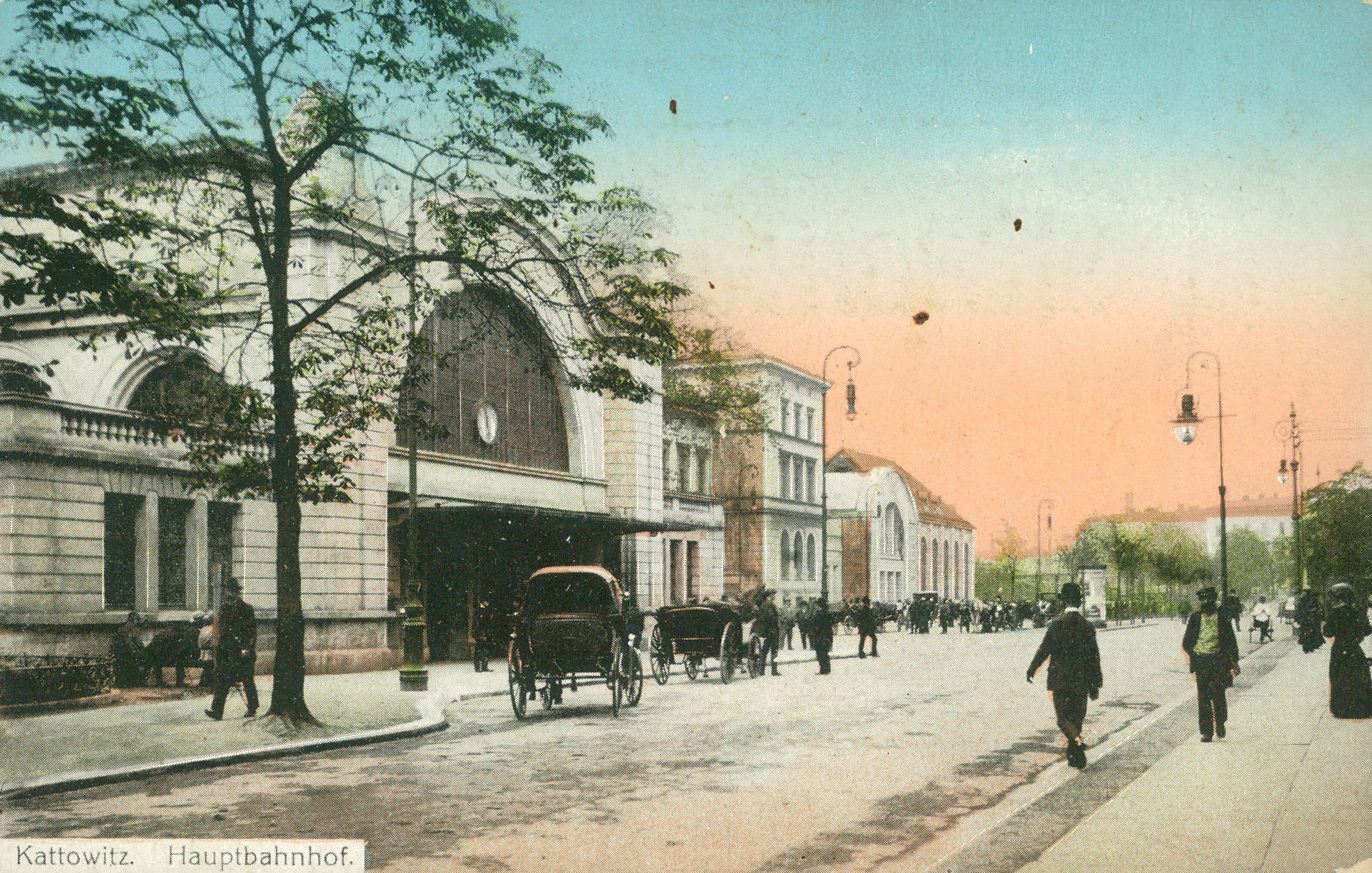
Former railway station complex in 1906; view from Dworcowa Street

Śródmieście gained a railway connection on 3 October 1846 as part of the Upper Silesian Railway route. Surveying work on the Strzybnica–Piekary–Roździeń–Bieruń Nowy section began as early as 1837, but likely as a result of Franz von Winckler's actions, the railway was redirected towards Katowice. It became one of the factors contributing to the development of the future city. The first Katowice railway station was a simple timbered building, which was demolished in the 19th century. In later periods, local connections were developed in Upper Silesia, mainly to support the transport of goods between industrial plants. On 1 December 1852, a railway connecting Katowice and Ligota, built by the Upper Silesian Railway and later leased to Wilhelm Railway, was put into operation. Connections were also established between the city and nearby industrial plants, including Katowice–Karolinegrube on 1 November (in Wełnowiec), in March 1864 Katowice–Ferdinandgrube (later the Katowice Mine), in 1869 sidings to the Baildon Steelworks, and a year later to the Marta Steelworks.

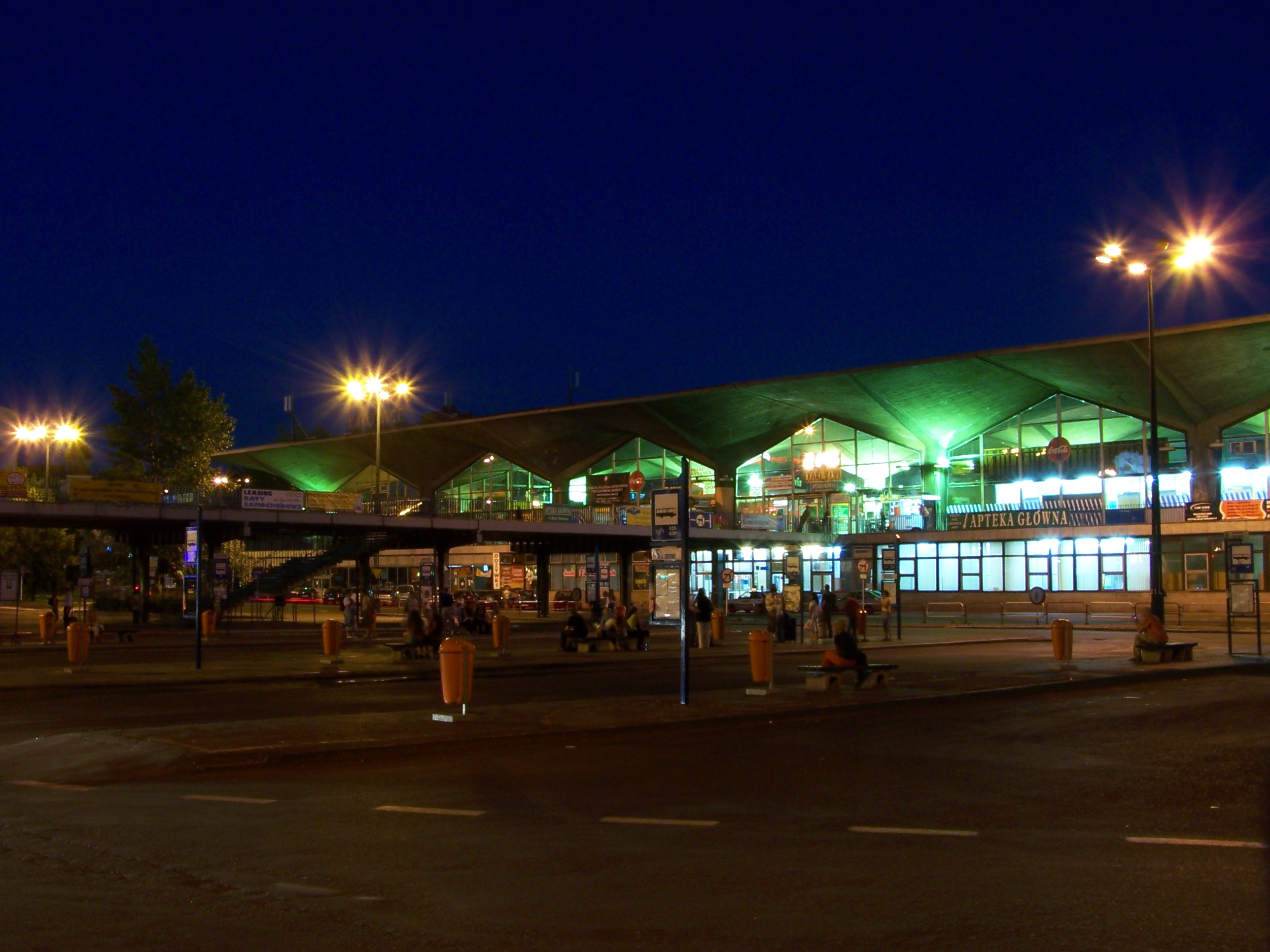
Now-demolished brutalist railway station building from 1972, photographed in 2008

Simultaneously with the construction of the railway connecting Szopienice with Sosnowiec in 1859, a new station building was opened. Various railway management institutions, including the narrow-gauge railway directorate and traffic inspection, also had their headquarters in Śródmieście. Between 1906 and 1908, the railway station in Katowice was expanded with new wings, and a freight classification yard was built on the border between Śródmieście and Załęże, which also included a double fan-shaped engine shed.

On 1 June 1957, the electrified section of the railway connecting Gliwice with Warsaw through Katowice was opened. In the following period, work began on the construction of a new railway station on the site of the former dispatch and freight station. In 1964, the pavilion on the side of Andrzeja Square was opened, along with underground passages under the tracks. In 1968, the pavilion on the side of T. Kościuszko Street was put into use, and in 1972, the main railway station building on the former W. Szewczyk Square was opened. In 1976, it served approximately 200 million people.

On 31 May 2011, the cornerstone was laid for the new railway station building and Galeria Katowicka shopping center. On 2 February 2013, an underground terminal for public transport buses was put into use. On 18 September 2013, Galeria Katowicka was opened, along with an underground parking lot that can accommodate approximately 1,200 cars.

=== Urban public transport ===
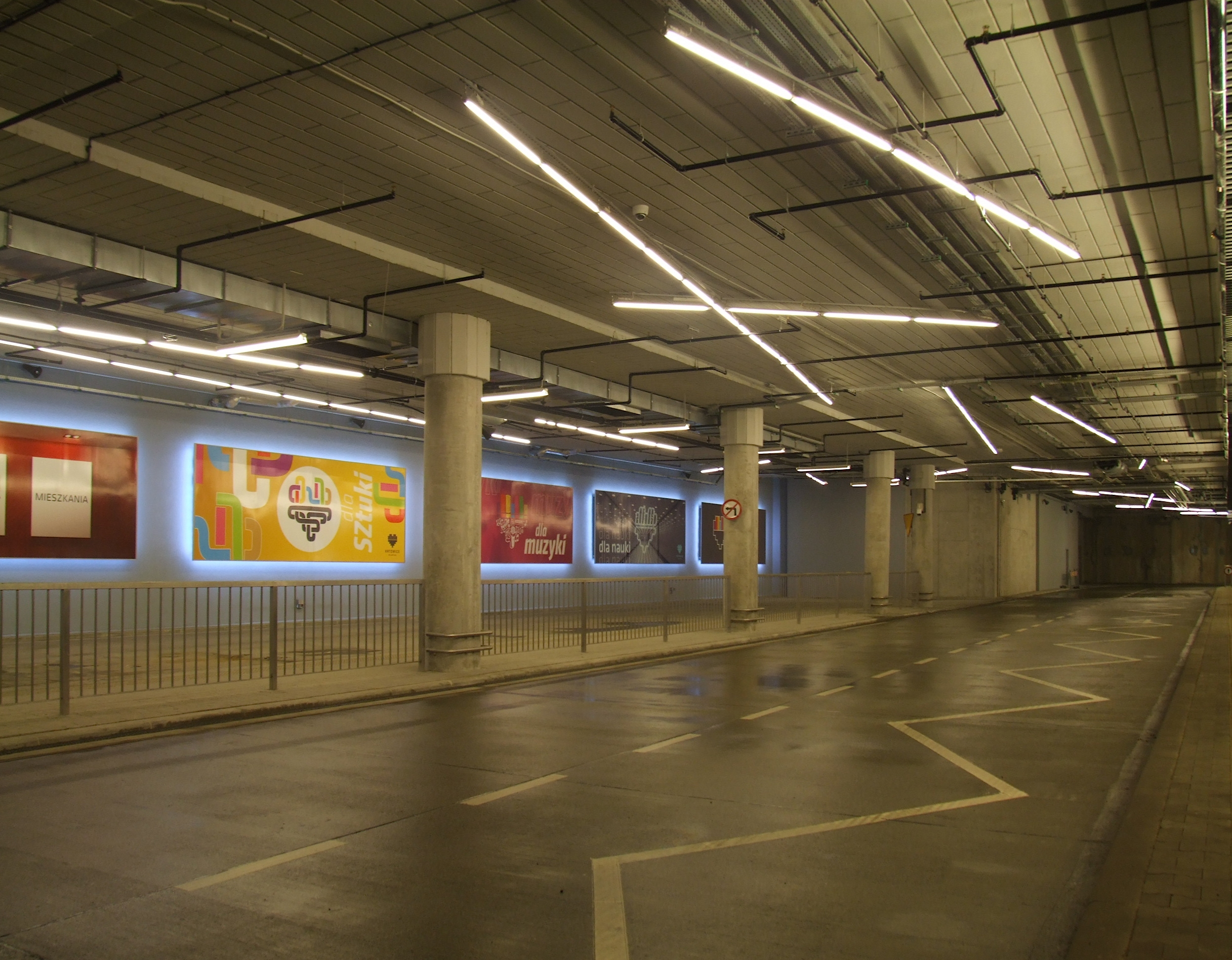
Katowice Dworzec bus terminal, located under the Katowice railway station building

The public transport in Śródmieście is based on tram and bus transport. It is organized by the Metropolitan Transport Authority, located at 21a Barbary Street in the district. The largest bus operators providing services on behalf of the Metropolitan Transport Authority through Śródmieście are: Katowice Municipal Transport Company, Sosnowiec Municipal Transport Company, and Gliwice Municipal Transport Company, while trams are operated by Silesian Interurbans. Śródmieście is the most important public transport hub in Metropolis GZM, with most of the main transfer points. In August 2007, non-pedestrian traffic accounted for approximately 50% of public transport journeys to the city center.

Beneath the main railway station in Katowice, there is a ten-bay Katowice Dworzec bus terminal, connecting this part of Śródmieście with other districts of Katowice and some cities of Metropolis GZM, including Chorzów, Gliwice, Mikołów, Mysłowice, Ruda Śląska, Tarnowskie Góry, Siemianowice Śląskie, and Zabrze, as well as Katowice Airport in Pyrzowice. In mid-March 2022, approximately 40 bus lines and 9 tram lines departed from the three-bay Katowice Plac Wolności stop in various directions, while the Katowice Piotra Skargi stop mainly served buses to the cities of Dąbrowa Basin, including Będzin, Dąbrowa Górnicza, and Sosnowiec.

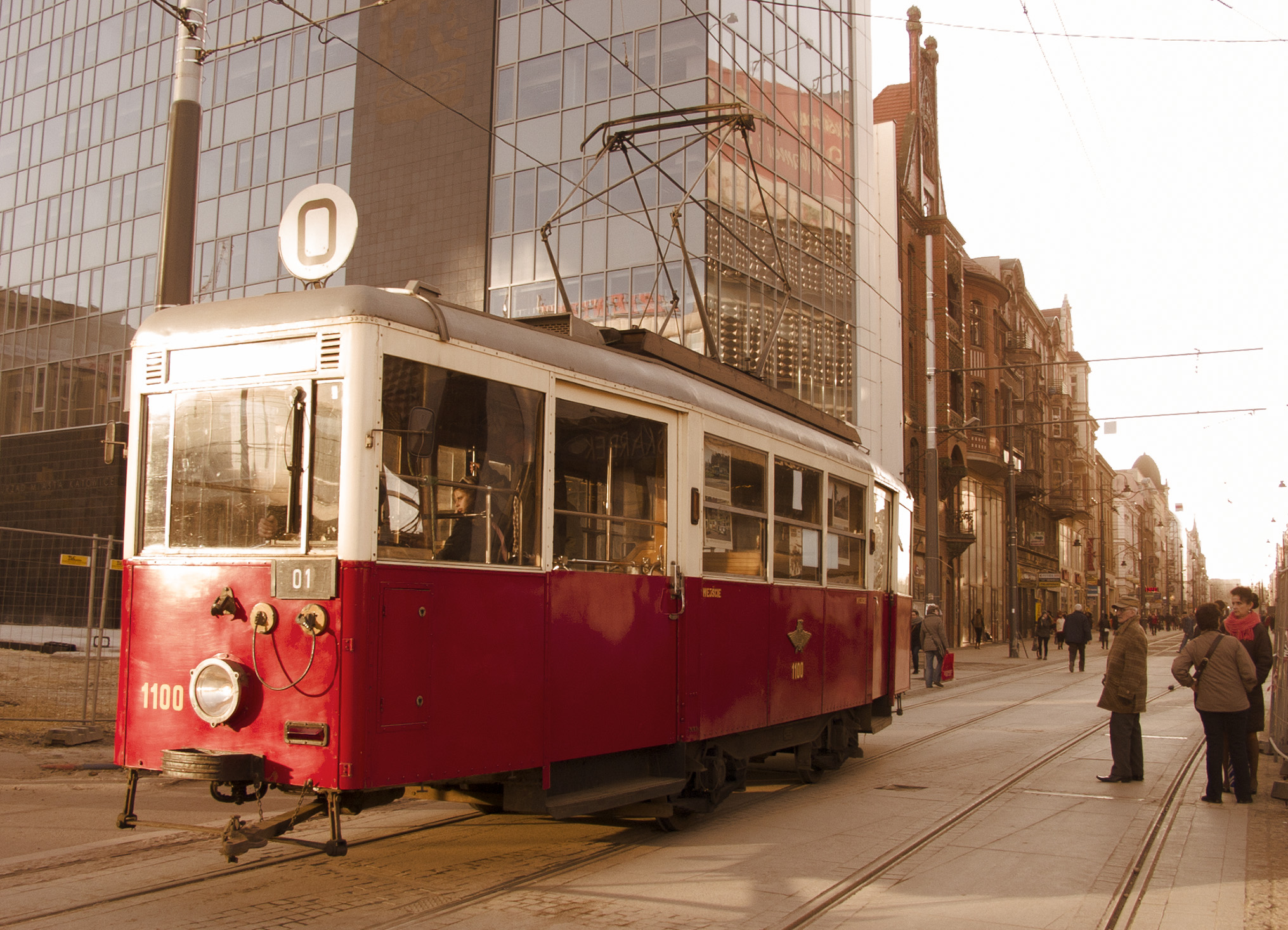
Historic Konstal N tram at the Market Square in May 2014

There are two tram stops in the Market Square area: Katowice Rynek and Katowice Rynek /Teatr Śl./. In mid-March 2022, nine tram lines departed from the first stop, connecting Śródmieście with other parts of Katowice, including Brynów, Dąb, Koszutka, Osiedle Tysiąclecia, Wełnowiec, and Załęże, as well as other cities, such as Bytom, Chorzów, Ruda Śląska, and Siemianowice Śląskie. From the second stop, 13 tram lines connected this part of the city with Brynów, Szopienice-Burowiec, Załęże, and Zawodzie, as well as the cities of Chorzów, Ruda Śląska, Sosnowiec, and Świętochłowice.

The beginnings of the tram network in what is now Śródmieście are linked to the Berlin-based company Kramer & Co. The concession for the first section in Katowice, connecting Królewska Huta (Chorzów) with Katowice via Dąb and further towards Laurahuta (Siemianowice Śląskie) via Wełnowiec, was obtained on 25 November 1898. On 29 December 1897, partial concessions were granted for the construction of the Świętochłowice–Hajduki–Załęże–Katowice tram line section and further to Mysłowice. In August 1898, the Katowice–Zawodzie section was put into use, and on September 7 of the same year, the route towards Załęże. The last section completed in Śródmieście was opened on 14 June 1912, running to Kościuszko Park. After World War I, in the fall of 1926, work began on converting the tracks on 3 Maja Street to standard gauge. On 27 October 1929, the Katowice–Hajduki Wielkie section was opened on a standard gauge track, and on 24 December 1940, the Market Square–Dąb section and further towards the current Chorzów Market Square.

In 1930, a depot and workshops were built on A. Mickiewicz Street for the buses of the Silesian Bus Lines company, which had been established in 1929. In 1939, the first bus station was built in the area of the current Market Square. In 1959, the depot was significantly expanded. The bus station at the Maket Square operated until the 1960s, when it was moved to the intersection of Sokolska and P. Skarga streets. The station at P. Skarga Street operated until 31 December 2020. During the same period, the Sądowa Transfer Center was built on Sądowa Street, also serving as an international bus station. The first buses departed from the transfer center on 30 September 2020.

== Architecture and urban planning ==
=== Architecture ===
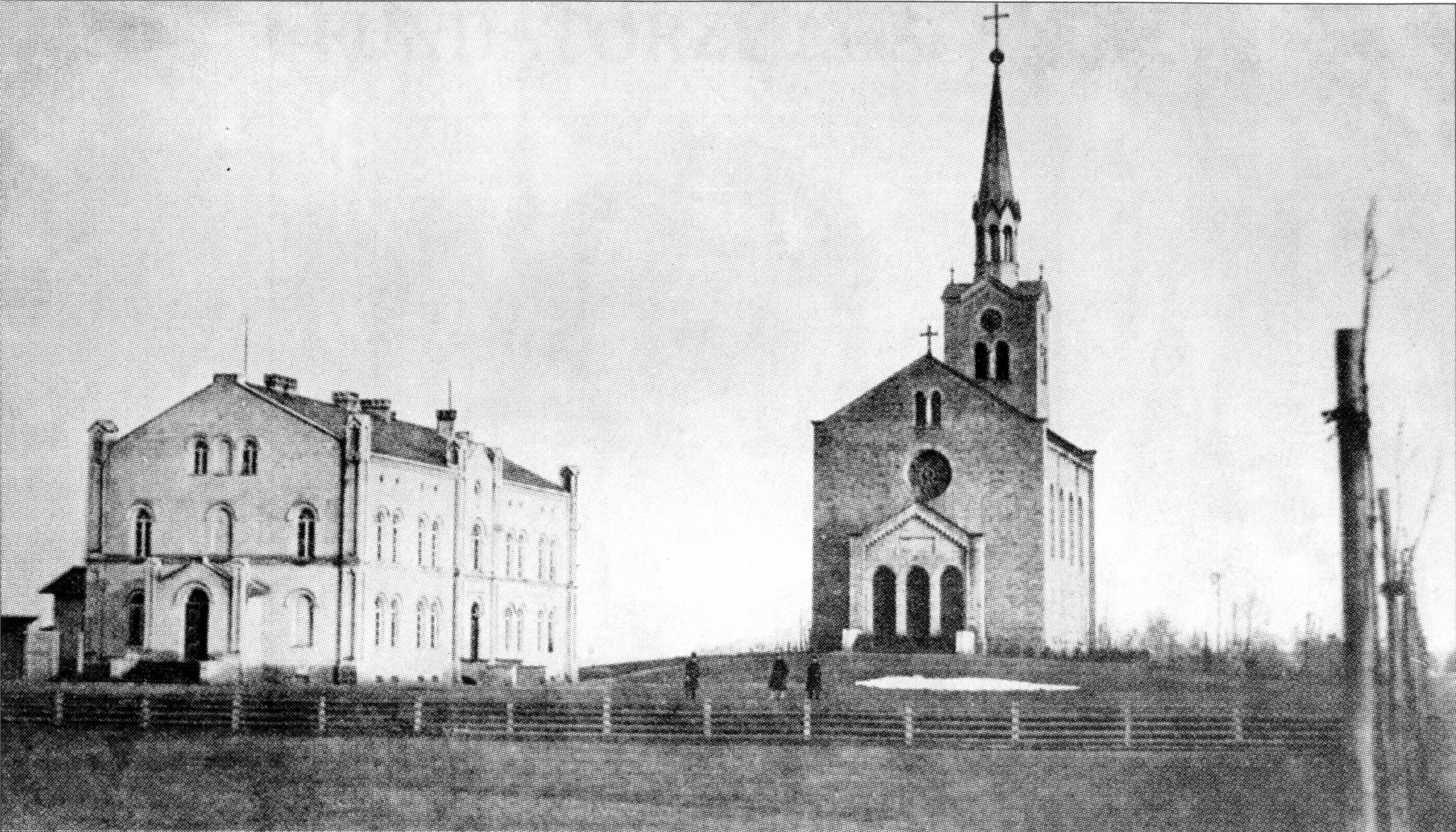
Photograph taken between 1860 and 1870 depicting the Evangelical church before its expansion and the still-existing Evangelical school at 5 Szkolna Street

Śródmieście is dominated by dense, block-style frontage buildings, and in terms of architecture, it has buildings in the historicist and eclectic styles, as well as International Style buildings from the interwar period with high historical importance. Most of Katowice's buildings listed in the Registry of Cultural Property are also located in Śródmieście.

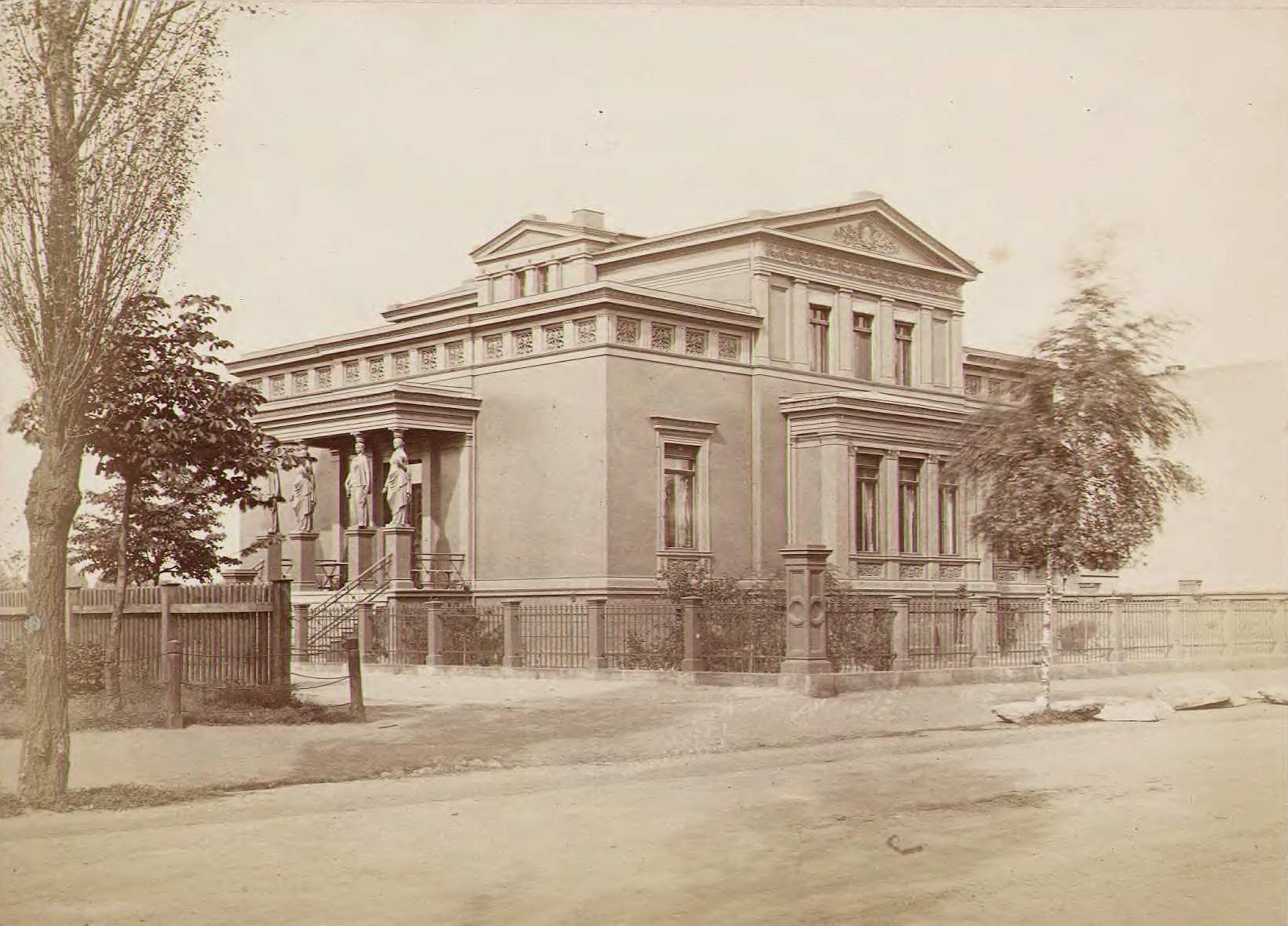
Photograph from around 1872 presenting the now-demolished Grundmann Villa, which was located at 20 Warszawska Street

The first more impressive buildings in what is now Śródmieście began to be constructed in the 1850s and 1860s along today's Warszawska Street, even before Katowice was granted town privileges. These include: the Romanesque Revival Evangelical church, built between 1856 and 1858 and later expanded, and the adjacent Evangelical school building, the neoclassical railway station complex opened in 1859 (the largest and most monumental building in Katowice at that time), the Gothic Revival Roman Catholic St. Mary's Church, built between 1862 and 1870, and garden villas. Some of the villas were later converted into tenements or demolished. The buildings changed over the years from single-story and two-story tenements or villas to multi-story buildings, especially at the turn of the 19th and 20th centuries. Currently, only a few tenements built between 1840 and 1870 remain, all rebuilt or converted. Few of them have retained part of their original decor, especially the tenement at 10 Warszawska Street from the second half of the 1860s. During this period, tenements were characterized by stylistic unity, mainly Renaissance Revival and Classicism, and were not typical tenements at the time. Buildings were then mainly rectangular in plan, with two or three stories.

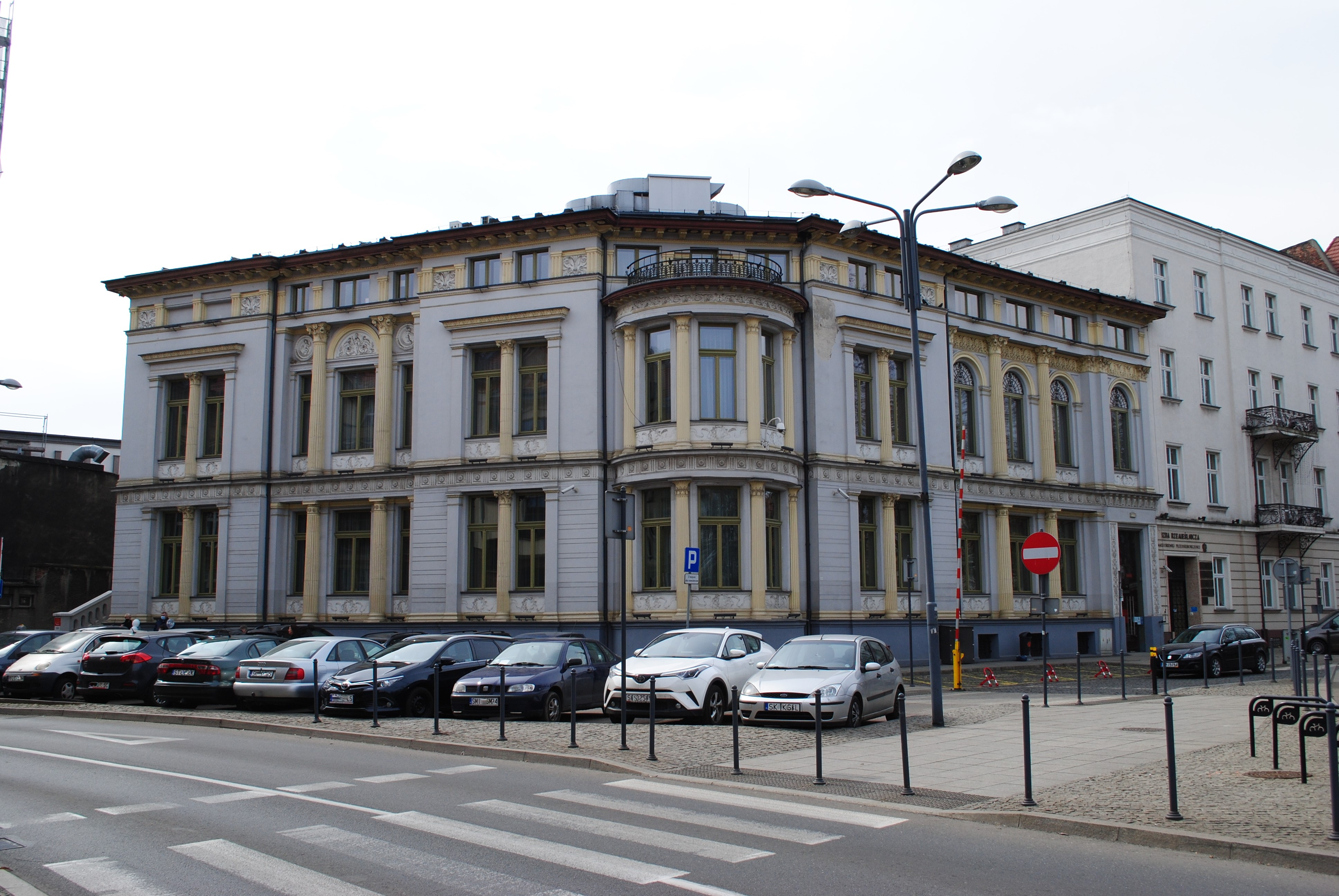
Former Goldstein Palace – currently the seat of the Civil Registry Office (12a Freedom Square)

In the 1870s, the area around today's Freedom Square was developed. The two-story Goldstein Palace, headquarters of the company owned by brothers Abraham and Józef Goldstein, was located at the corner of Freedom Square and Jan Matejko Street. The square also had a monument to two German emperors, Wilhelm I and his son Frederick III, erected in 1898. The 1880s were a period of major construction activity in Katowice. The tenements built at that time were taller, mainly four and five stories high, and more often decorated with avant-corps, bay windows, and towers. The buildings became denser, with tenements forming compact rows of street frontages. The development of today's Śródmieście at that time reached the areas of present-day Freedom Square, Mariacka Street, Dworcowa Street, and the southern part of the district, especially along the railway tracks and present-day Tadeusz Kościuszko and Mikołowska streets.

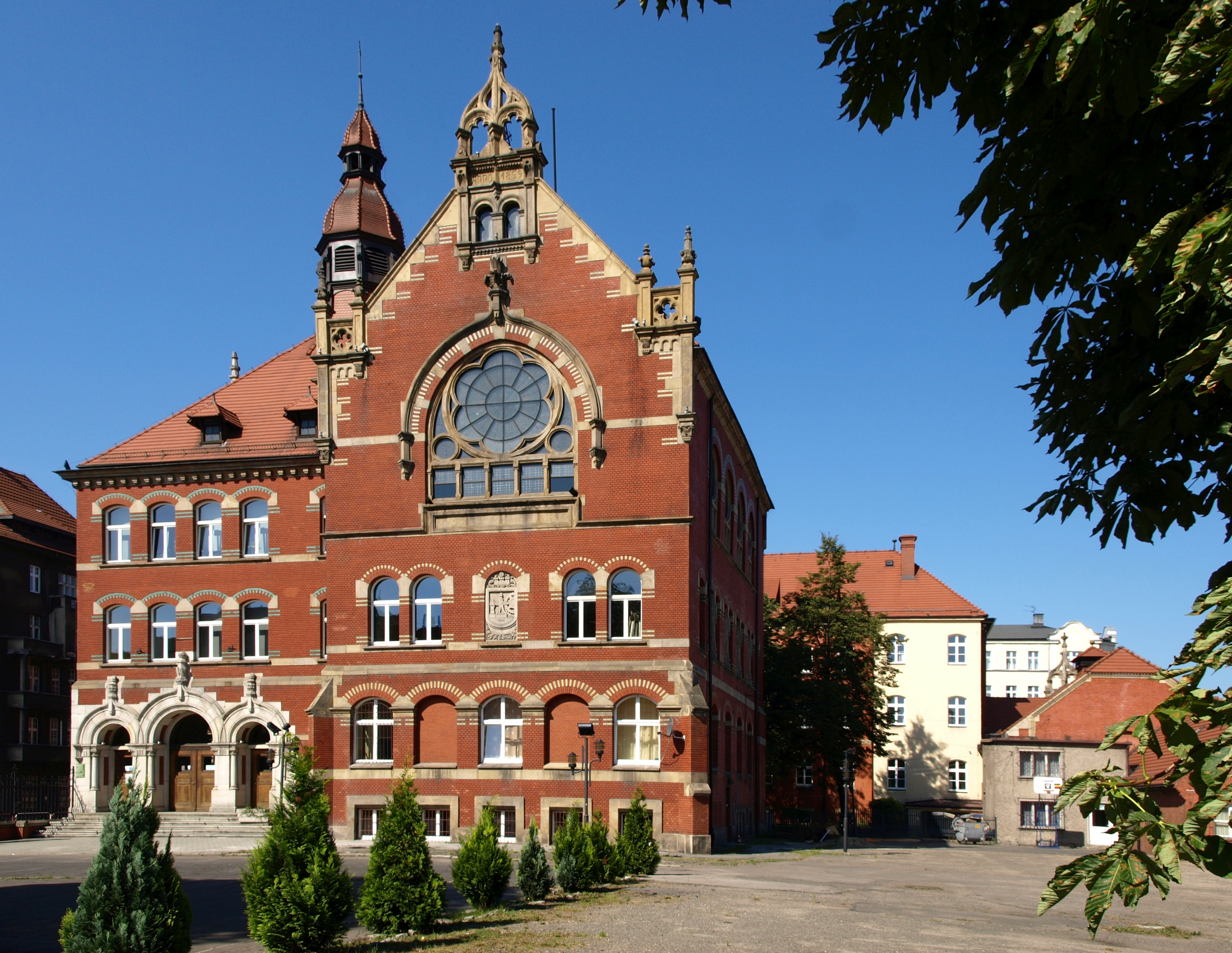
Historic building of the Adam Mickiewicz High School (11 A. Mickiewicz Street)

Between 1880 and 1900, Baroque Revival and Renaissance Revival architecture dominated, while Gothic Revival style was used least frequently, mainly for public buildings such as schools and churches. During this period, several Baroque Revival tenements were completed, including those at 5 and 35 Warszawska Street. Monumental schools were also constructed during this period, such as the buildings of the current Adam Mickiewicz High School and Karol Szymanowski Academy of Music. Other important structures from this period include the neoclassical building of the present-day post office (1 Pocztowa Street), the District Court (16/18 Andrzeja Street), and the Katowice-West District Court (10 Freedom Square). Between 1906 and 1907, the building of the Municipal Theatre (now the seat of the Silesian Theatre) was built on the Market Square, designed by Karl Moritz.

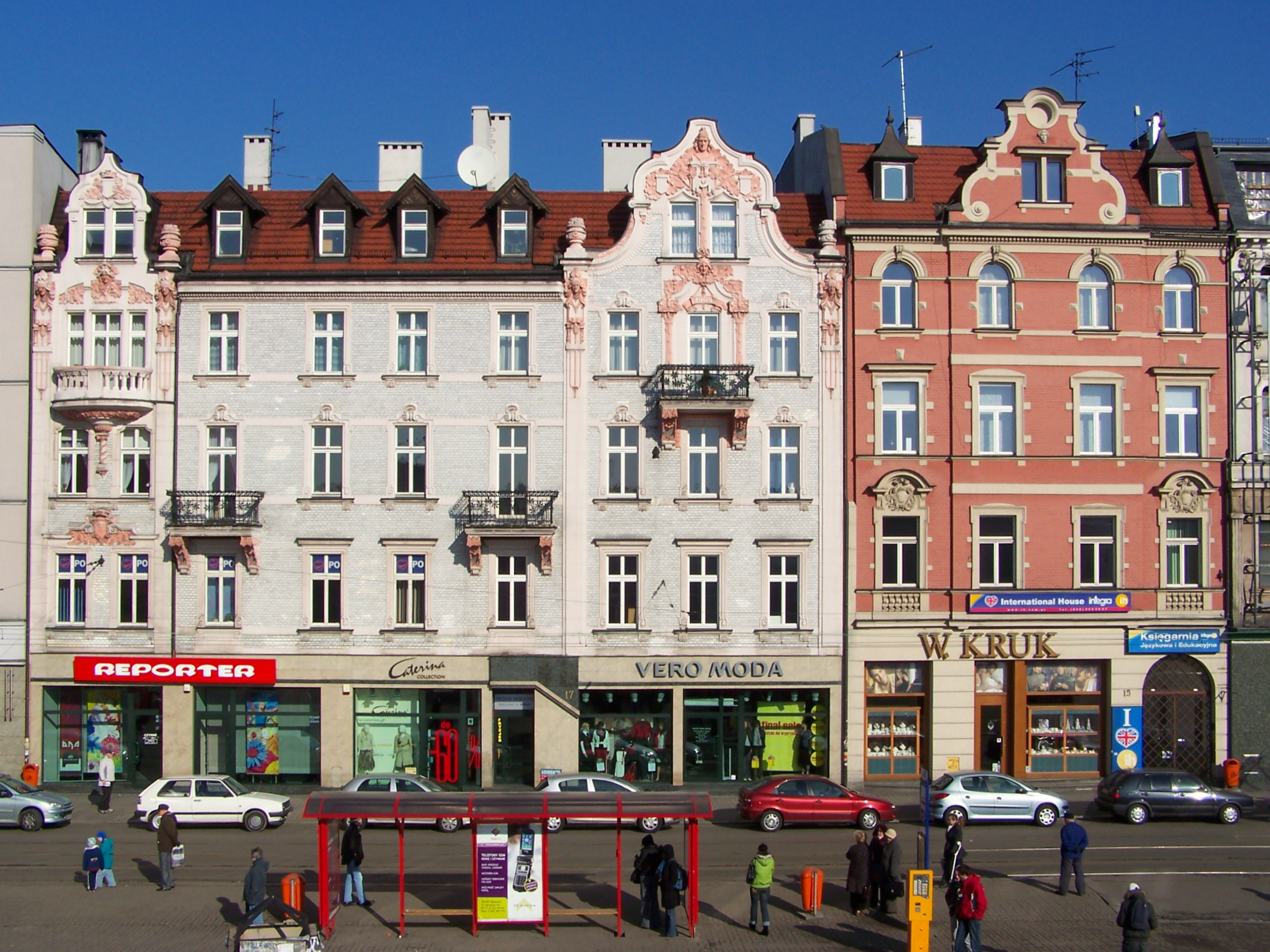
Art Nouveau tenement at 17 3 Maja Street (left) and 15 (right)

At the turn of the 19th and 20th centuries, the Art Nouveau style began to appear in today's Śródmieście. It was often combined with other styles in Katowice, especially Renaissance, Classicism, and others, resulting in few buildings that are purely Art Nouveau. Classic examples of Art Nouveau architecture in the district are tenements at 14 A. Mickiewicz Street and 11 F. Chopin Street, combining the moderation and simplicity of the facades with the ornamentation and color scheme of the buildings. The second trend, with geometric elements and simple vertical lines of decoration, is represented by, among others, two neighboring tenements at 10 Dyrekcyjna Street and 6 Staromiejska Street.

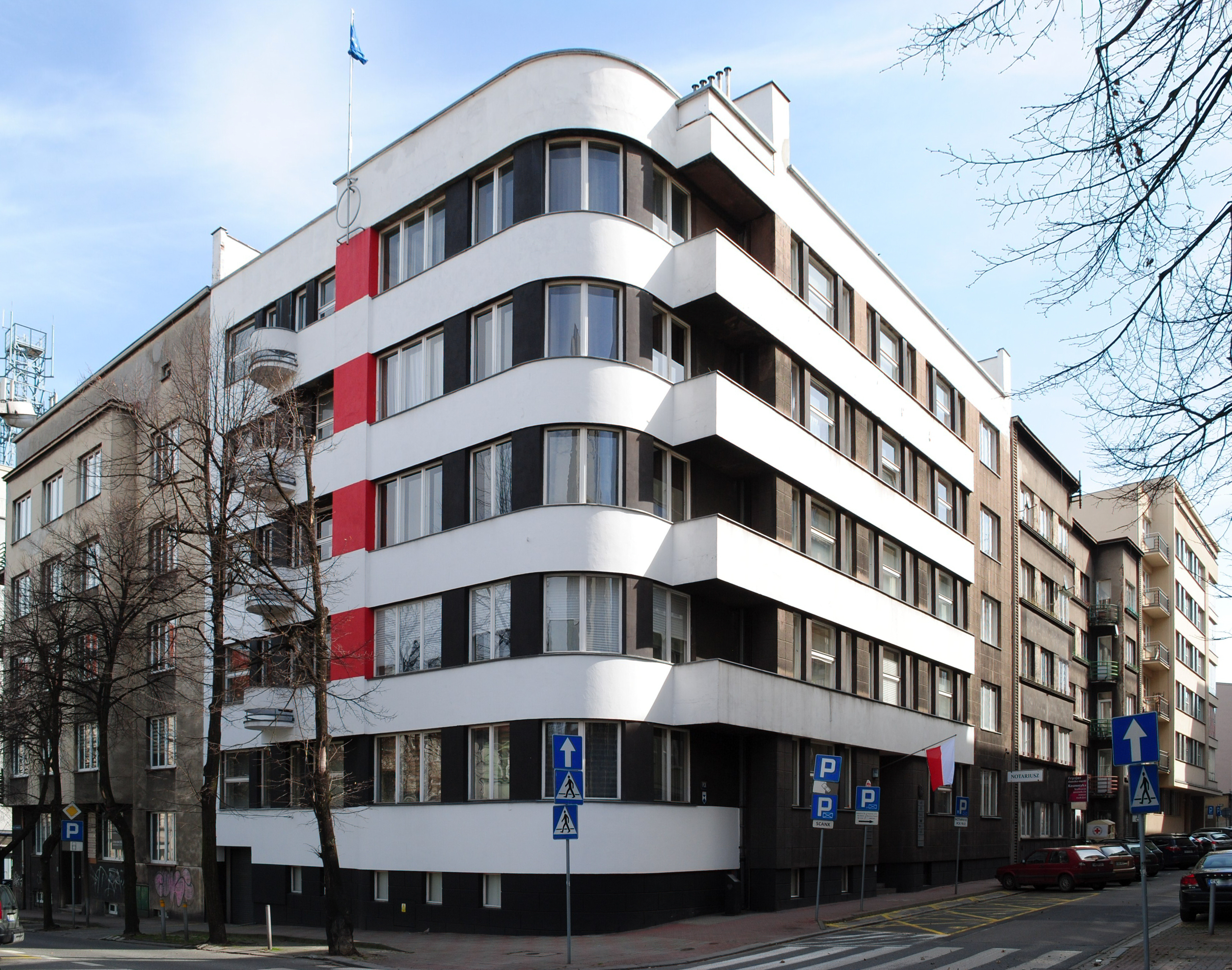
Modernist tenement at 10 PCK Street – Wędlikowski House

The incorporation of part of Upper Silesia, including Katowice, into Poland in 1922 made the city an important administrative center with autonomous rights, contributing greatly to the further development of Śródmieście. In 1929, the classicist building of the Silesian Parliament and Silesian Voivodeship Office was completed, and in the 1920s, a Renaissance Revival building for the Katowice County authorities was erected at 45 Warszawska Street. In the 1930s, for the needs of the newly established Diocese of Katowice, the Renaissance Revival Bishop's Palace was built in the area of Wit Stwosz, H. Sienkiewicz, and Powstańców streets, and construction of the Cathedral of Christ the King began, completed in 1956. The interwar period was also a time of intense construction development in the southern part of Śródmieście. During this period, International Style dominated architecture. The most important buildings constructed in this style include: Drapacz Chmur, built between 1930 and 1932 (or between 1930 and 1934) on Żwirki i Wigury Street, the building of the National Economy Bank built between 1928 and 1930 on 3 A. Mickiewicz Street, and the building of the Silesian Museum, which was demolished during World War II. Sacral architecture of this period is represented by the garrison church located on M. Kopernik Street, which was put into use in 1931, designed by Leon Dietz d'Arma.

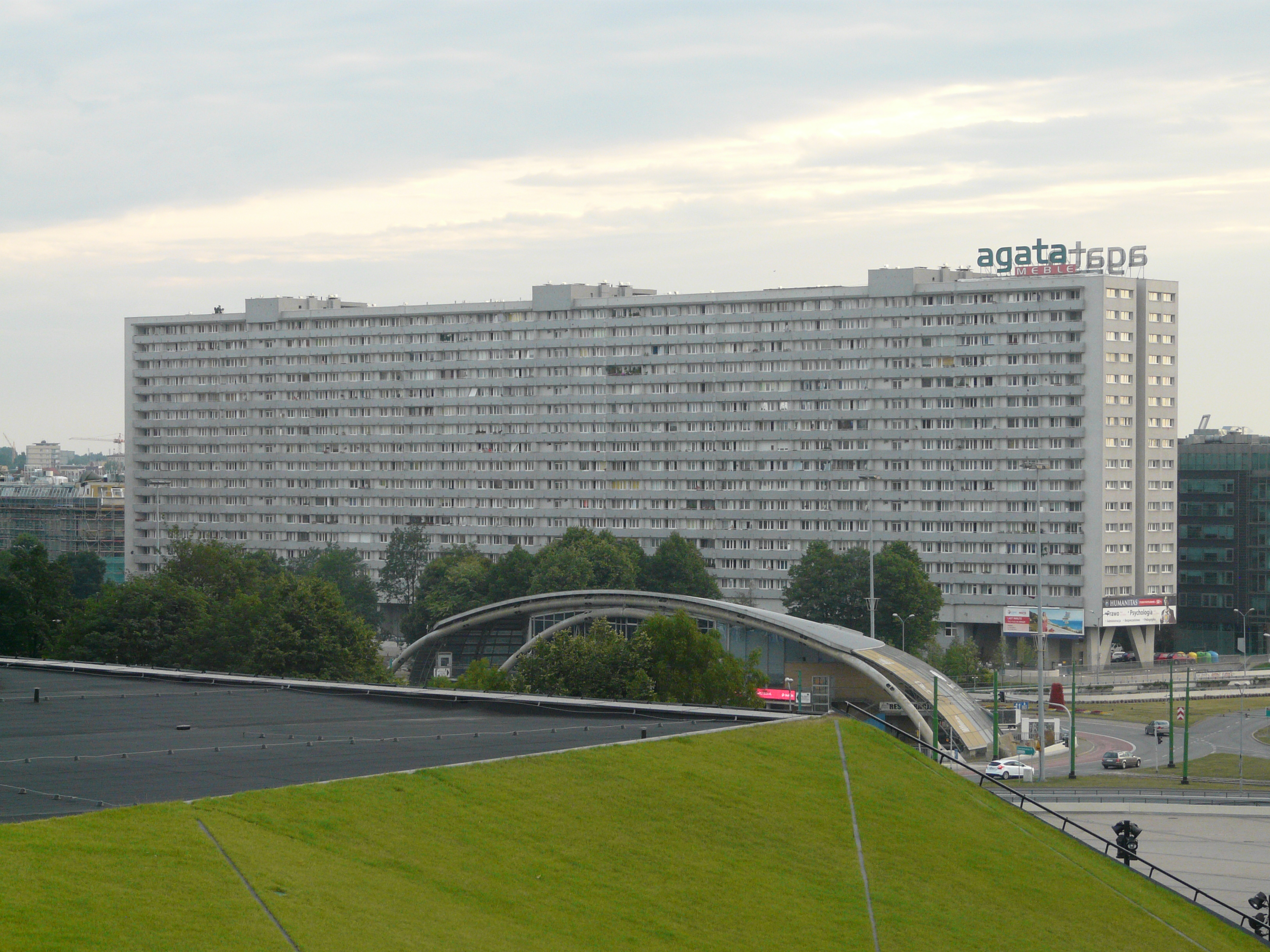
Multi-family building Superjednostka built as part of the so-called "Western Block" (W. Korfanty Avenue)

Post-war architectural development in Śródmieście began between 1945 and 1949 and was a continuation of the architectural and urban planning concepts from the previous period, which had been interrupted by the German occupation. One of the most important buildings constructed at that time was the Youth Palace, designed by a team of architects: Zygmunt Majerski and Julian Duchowicz. The building has the hallmarks of interwar cubist architecture, while the interior features socialist realist elements. The palace was put into use in 1951, and five years later, the Trade Union House, designed by Henryk Buszko and Aleksander Franta, was built on Bolesław Chrobry Square.

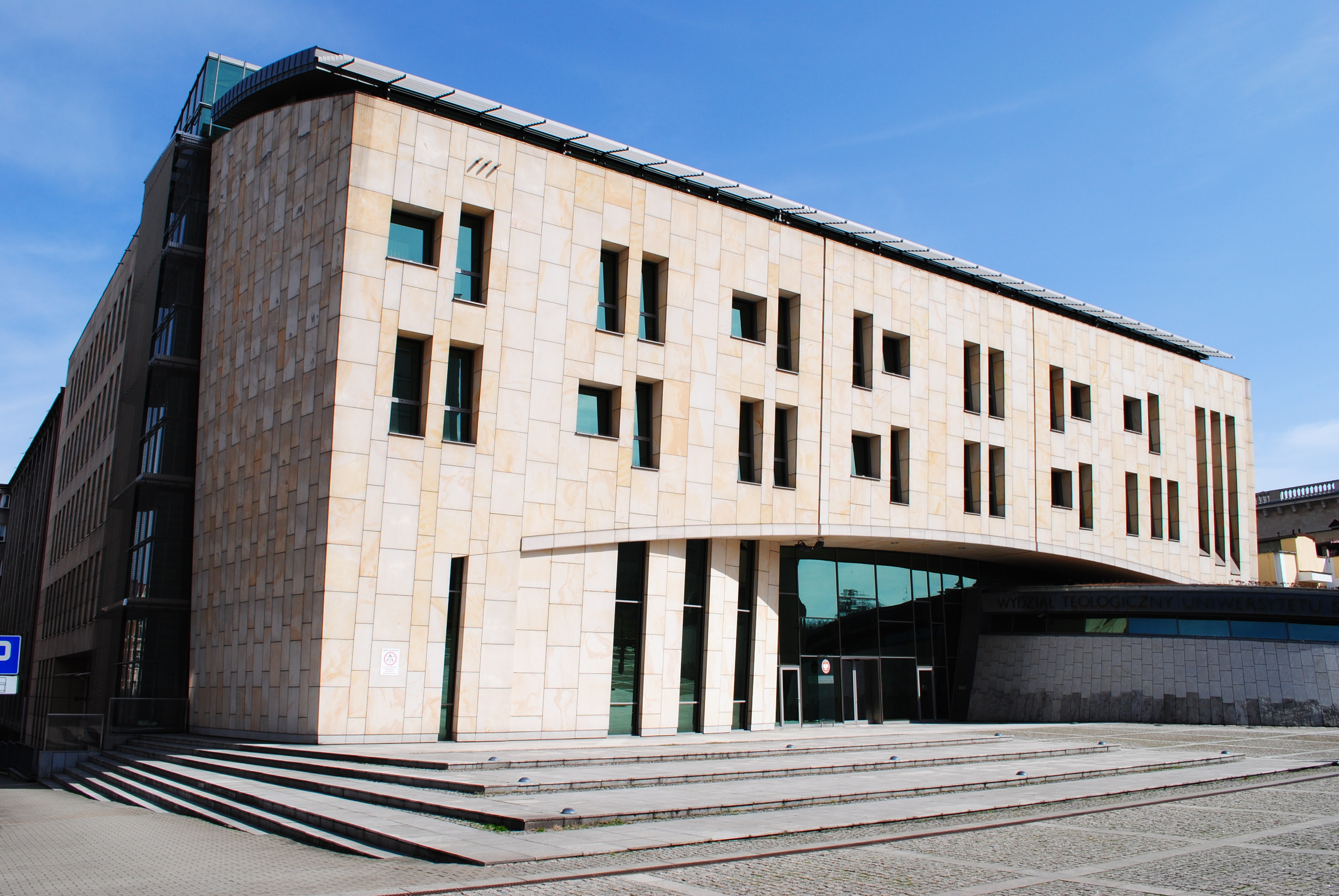
Building of the Faculty of Theology of the University of Silesia (18 H. Jordan Street)

A shift in the architectural development of Śródmieście occurred in 1959 after the authorities' decision to build a modern city center – the so-called "Western Block". Mieczysław Król was responsible for the conceptual design. The following buildings were constructed as part of Western Block: Superjednostka, Ślizgowiec, Separator, Hotel Silesia, and pavilions, including the Art Exhibition Bureau, and the Wedding Palace, demolished in 2011. On the eastern side of today's W. Korfanty Avenue, the Katowice Hotel and the Delikatesy building were constructed, and in 1967, the Silesian Insurgents Memorial by Wojciech Zabłocki and Gustaw Zemła was unveiled. Three modern buildings were constructed in the area of the Market Square: Zenit (1962) and Skarbek (1975) cooperative department stores, and the office building of the Silesian Press Publishing House (known as the "Press House"). In 1972, a new brutalist railway station designed by Wacław Kłyszewski, Jerzy Mokrzyński, and Eugeniusz Wierzbicki was opened.

Since the 1990s, Katowice has been developing a postmodern style inspired by Western Europe. The beginnings of the new style in Śródmieście can be traced back to 1981, when the construction of the Stalexport Skyscrapers was completed, designed by Yugoslav architect Georgo Gruicić. Between 2002 and 2003, the Altus Skyscraper, with a total height of 125 meters, was built on Uniwersytecka Street. The contemporary architecture of Śródmieście often references the industrial heritage of Katowice, as in the building of the National Bank of Poland branch, built in 2006, in which the administrative wing is covered with black slate, referring to the city's mining past. Other important buildings constructed in Śródmieście at the beginning of the 21st century include the Symfonia Center for Science and Music Education from 2007, designed by architect Tomasz Konior, and the building of the Faculty of Theology of the University of Silesia, opened in 2004.

=== Urban planning ===
Plan of the areas of present-day Śródmieście from around 1900

Katowice has a clearly defined downtown area with a planned and coherent urban layout that developed in a relatively short period of time, starting from the arrival of the first railway in Katowice in the mid-19th century. The axis of the urban layout of Śródmieście is formed by today's 3 Maja and Warszawska streets, intersecting at the Market Square. This axis is accentuated by two squares located parallel to each other about 600 meters from the Market Square: on the west side, at the edge of 3 Maja Street, there is Freedom Square, and on the other side of the axis, at Warszawska Street, there is E. Szramek Square. Perpendicular to the main axis, also at a similar distance and north of the Market Square, there is Jerzy Ziętek Square, and opposite the axis, K. Miarka Square. The following streets are also of great compositional importance: A. Mickiewicz, closed off by the Stalexport Skyscrapers and the Global Office Park complex, and Mariacka Street with the St. Mary's Church at the end of the street.

The first urban plans for the city, which was then under construction, were drawn up in 1856 and 1859. The first of these was developed by architect Nottenbohm. The axes of the city layout were Warszawska Street, running along the old route to Mysłowice, the Market Square, located at the intersection of this route and the road towards Mikołów, the newly marked 3 Maja Street, and Freedom Square. These axes were integrated into the new street grid, in which an effort was made to maintain a perpendicular and parallel street layout. From the south, the urban layout of Katowice was closed off by railway tracks.

In terms of architecture and urban planning, Śródmieście is divided into several clearly parallel zones:

- Central – the northern part of the zone is located between Chorzowska Street, W. Roździeński Avenue, and the Rawa river, where the city center buildings from the 1960s and 1970s are located (including Haperowiec, Superjednostka, Ślizgowiec, Separator, Katowice Hotel, and the now-demolished Silesia Hotel), the campus of the University of Silesia, and the areas around Sokolska and A. Mickiewicz streets with contemporary buildings (including Chorzowska 50, Sokolska 30 Towers, and Global Office Park). The part covers the area between Rawa river and the railway grounds and includes the earliest developed area of Śródmieście along the axis of the following streets: 1 Maja–Warszawska–Market Square–3 Maja–Freedom Square and Dworcowa–Mariacka.
- Southern – covers a large section between the railway tracks and Górnośląska Avenue (A4 motorway). This part is distinguished by an area formed during the interwar period, with the axes of the following streets and squares: Jagiellońska–B. Chrobry Square–Silesian Parliament Square–K. Miarka Square–M. Kopernik–Andrzeja Square and the axis of the following streets: T. Kościuszko–W. Stwosz–J. Kochanowski. The southern areas of Śródmieście, dominated by service buildings, are less densely developed. The section around S. Adamski, Mikołowska, Strzelecka, and Raciborska streets is a residential and service area, while the areas around Kozielska Street are post-industrial.

=== Spatial development ===
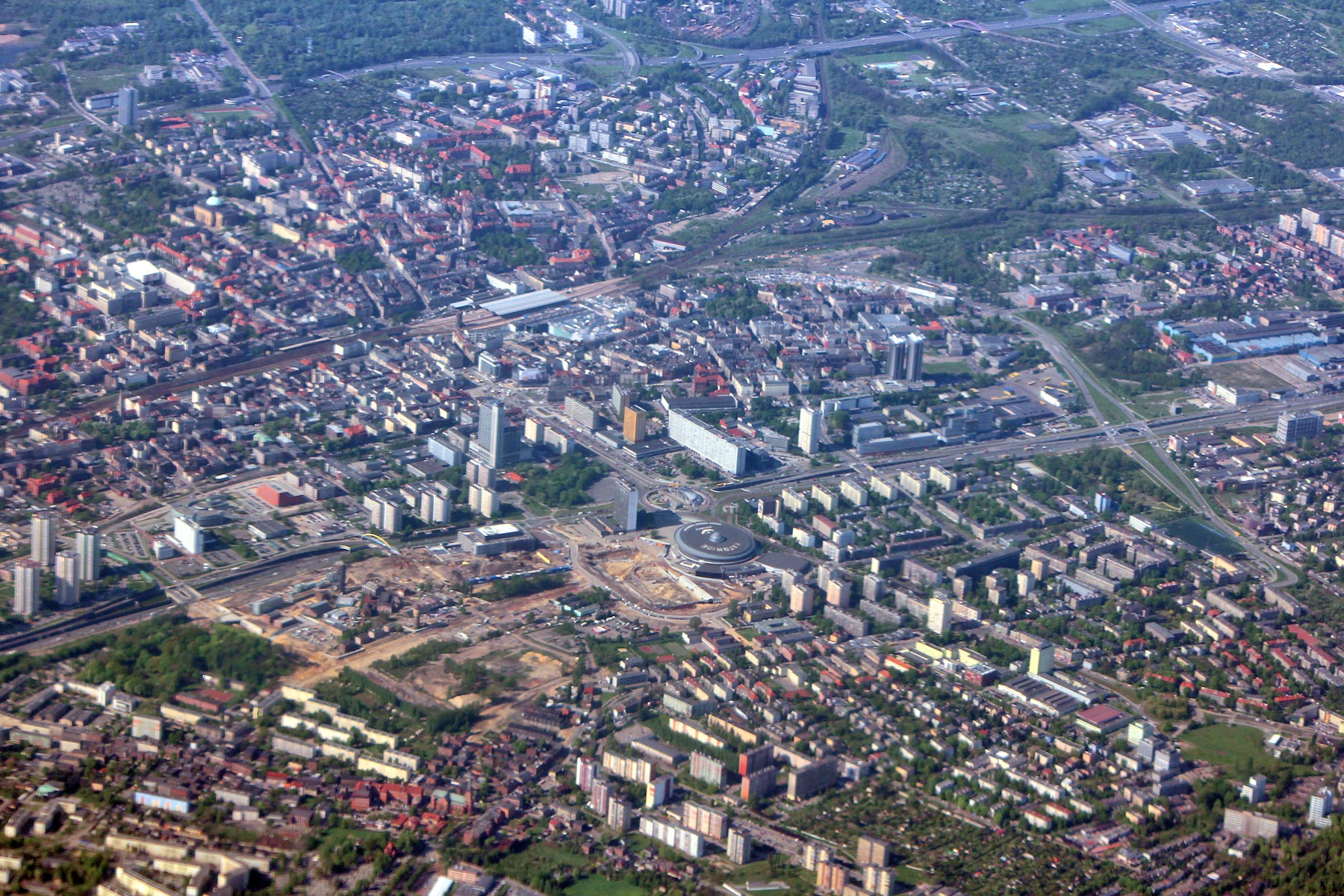
View of the center of Katowice in May 2013; at the top, the areas of Śródmieście and the eastern part of Załęże, at the bottom, Bogucice and Koszutka

In terms of floor area ratio, Śródmieście has the highest proportion of built-up land in relation to the total area of the district, at 50% (Zawodzie and Załęże are tied for second place with 32%). Over 75% of the built-up area is located between the railway tracks and the Rawa river – in the vicinity of the following streets: St. Stanisław, Warszawska, 3 Maja, Młyńska, Pocztowa, St. Jan, Dworcowa, A. Mielęcki, Staromiejska, Dyrekcyjna, and Stawowa, as well as the areas in the southern part of Śródmieście between Wojewódzka, H. Dąbrowski, W. Reymont, and Francuska streets.

The net floor area ratio for Śródmieście is also by far the highest, at 1.79. The highest building density (2.5 on average) is found in the downtown area around the following streets: P. Skarga, Sokolska, A. Mickiewicz, J. III Sobieski, Sądowa, J. Słowacki, Dworcowa, Mariacka, Francuska, Warszawska, Szkolna, S. Moniuszko, and Piastowska. In the area of the Market Square, this index is over 3.00, while in the southern part of Śródmieście, depending on the area, it averages between 2.5 and 3.0. The weighted average number of storeys in Śródmieście is 3.58, higher than the average for the entire city, which is 2.13 storeys.

In terms of residential development, Śródmieście is dominated by multi-family housing. It is also a district where a large part of the area – nearly 130 ha – is occupied by service buildings, as well as transport infrastructure.

=== Monuments and places of national remembrance ===
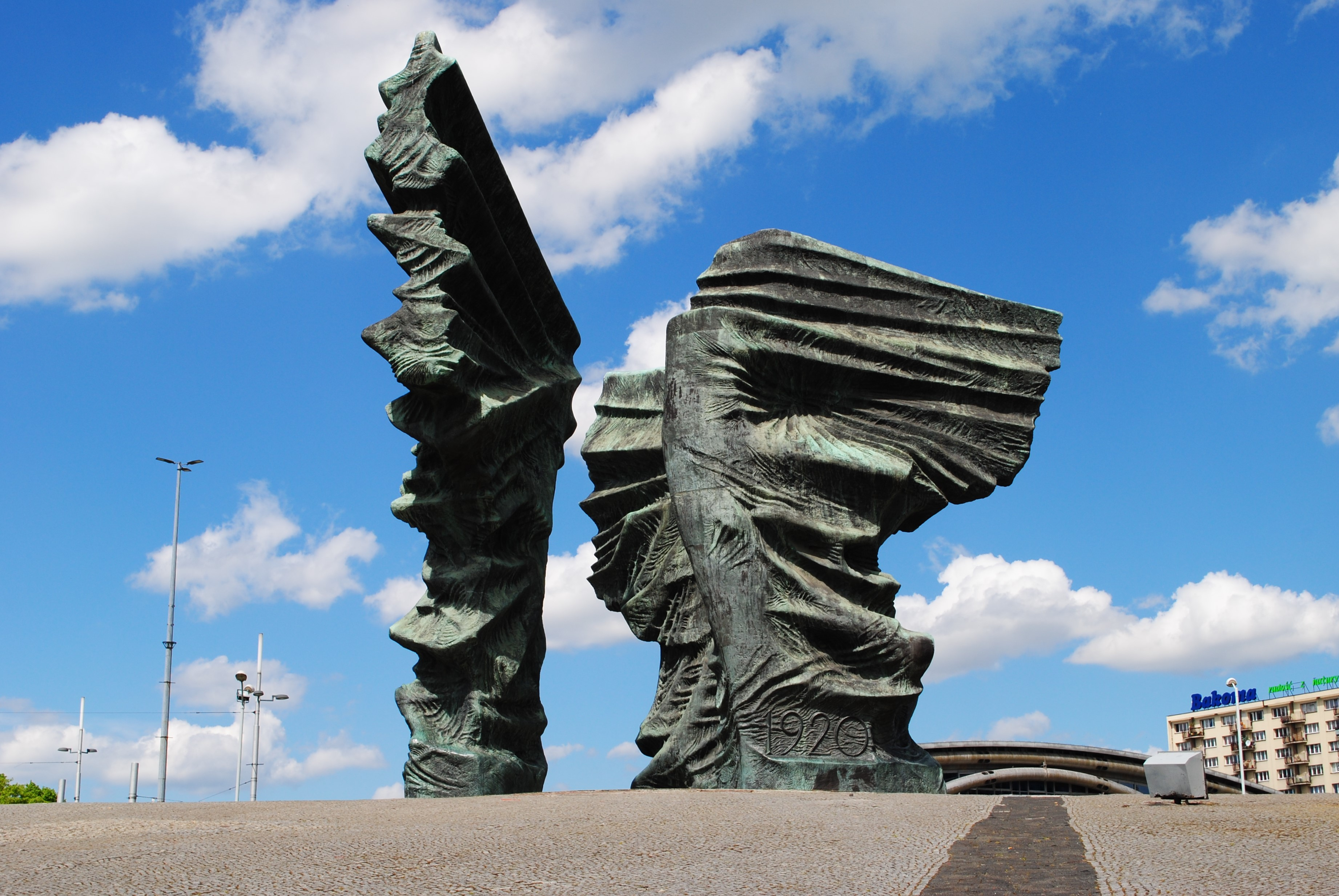
Silesian Insurgents Memorial

The most important places of remembrance located in Śródmieście include:

- Silesian Insurgents Memorial (Jerzy Ziętek Square); from 1967,
- September Scouts Monument (Market Square); from 1983,
- Victims of Katyn Monument (Andrzeja Square); from 2001,
- Stanisław Moniuszko Monument (Karol Miarka Square); from 1930, rebuilt in 1959,
- Wojciech Korfanty Monument (Silesian Parliament Square); from 1999,
- Józef Piłsudski Monument (Bolesław Chrobry Square); from 1936, erected in 1993,
- Obelisk of the Silesian Eagles (B. Chrobry Square); from 1984.

== Education ==
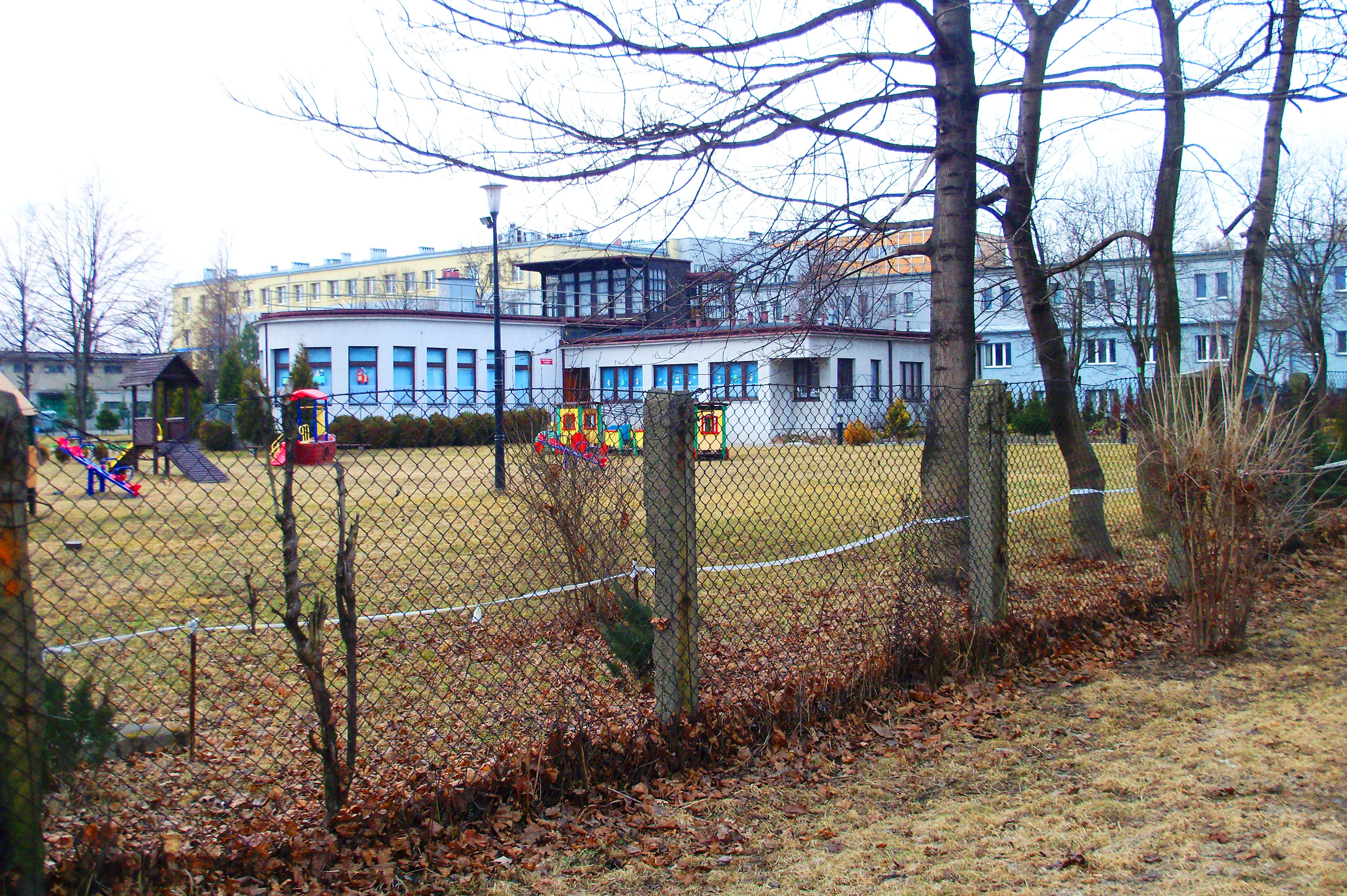
Headquarters of Municipal Kindergarten No. 3 (25 Barbary Street)

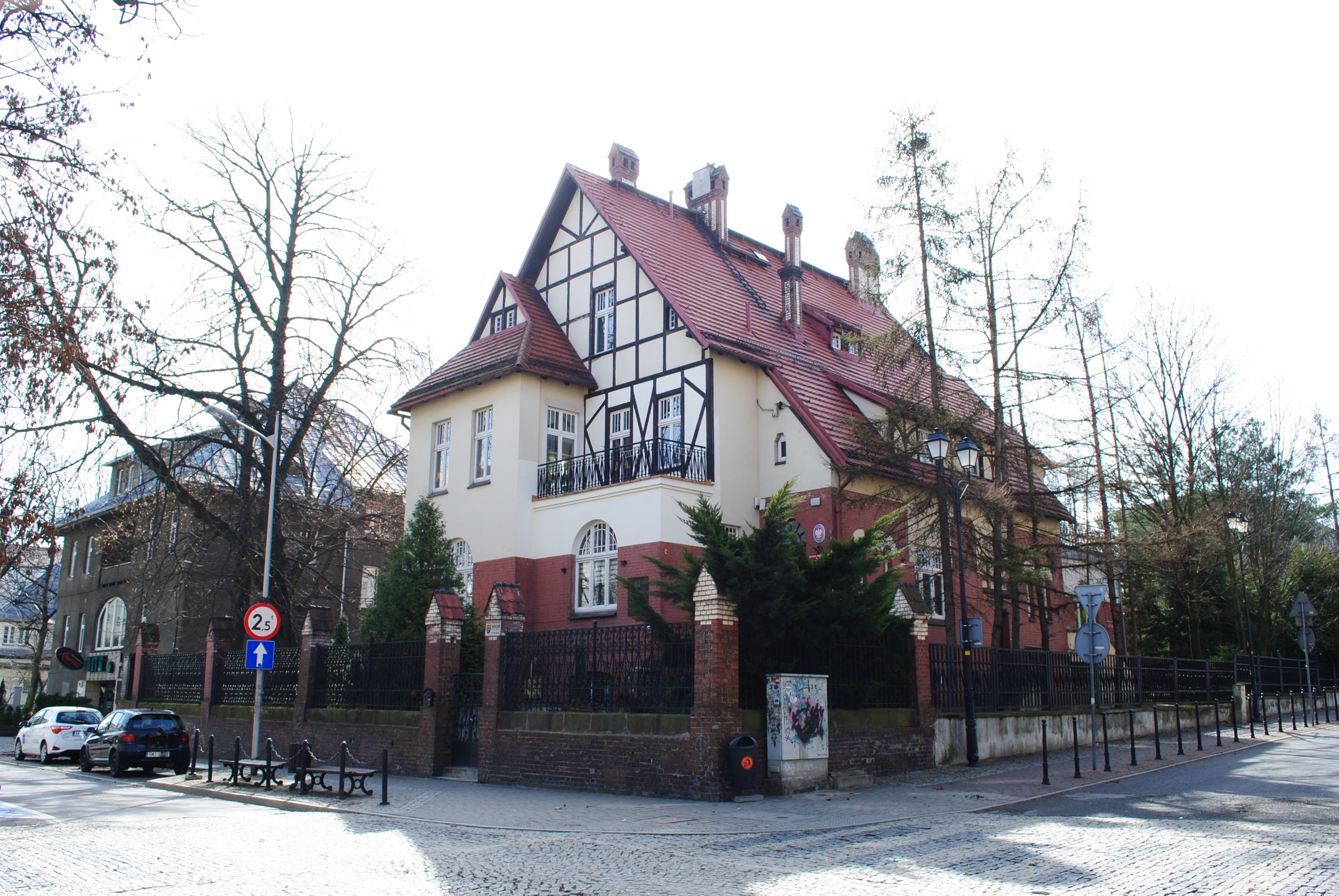
Headquarters of Municipal Kindergarten No. 33 – the so-called "Korfantówka" (23 Powstańców Street)

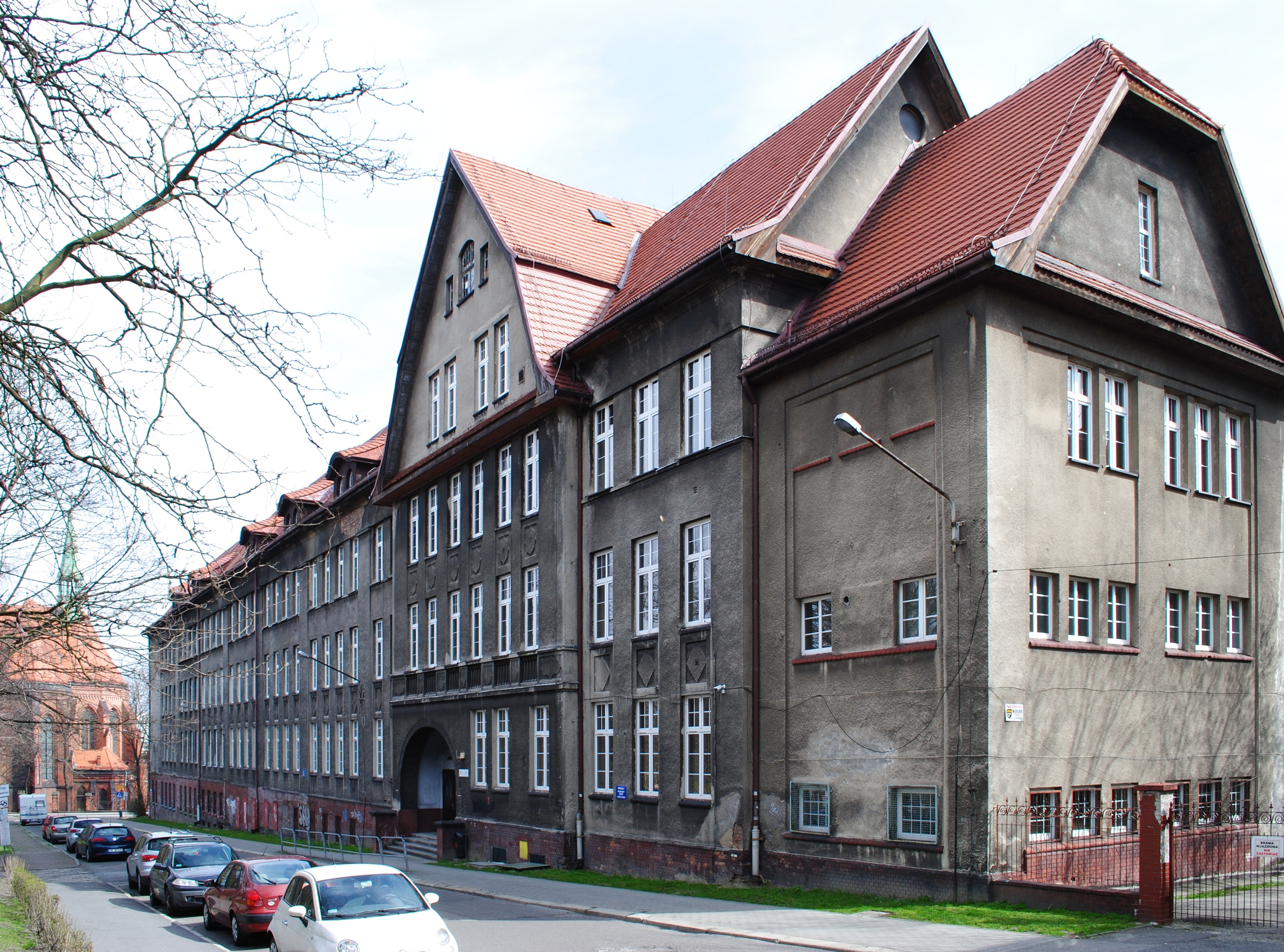
Building of the Maria Konopnicka High School with Bilingual Divisions (6 B. Głowacki Street)

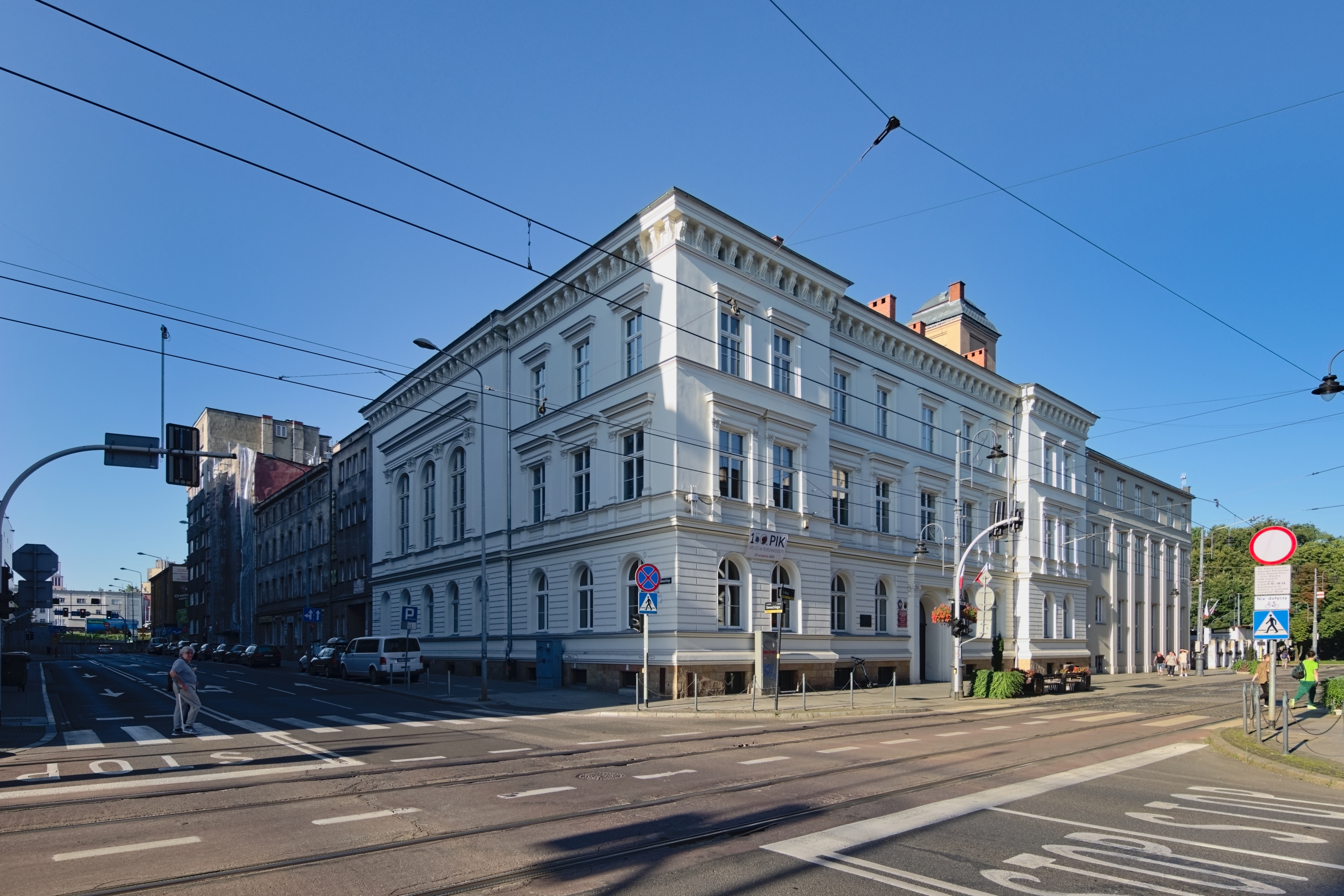
Headquarters of the Maria Skłodowska-Curie High School with Bilingual Divisions (42 3 Maja Street)

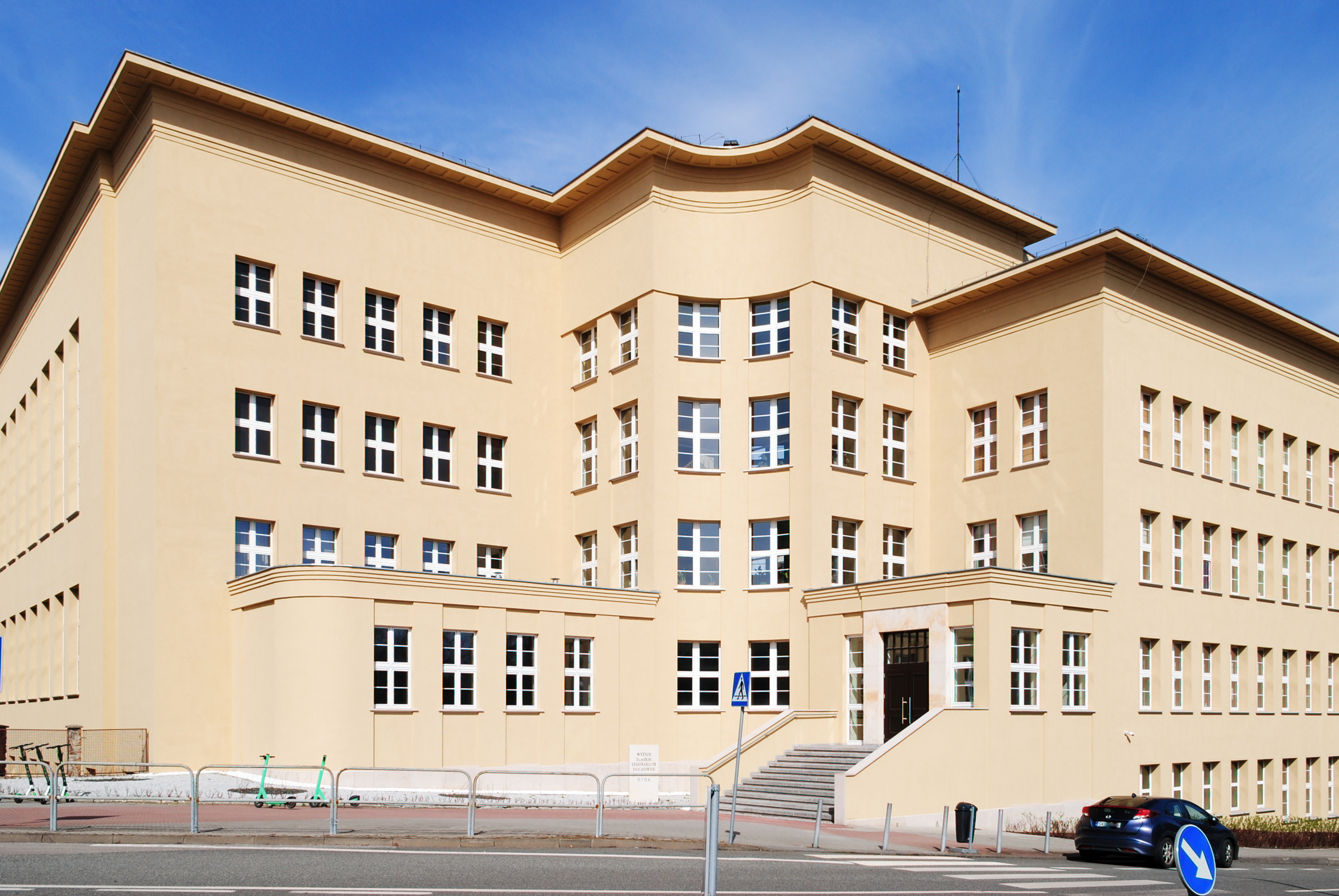
Headquarters of the Higher Silesian Theological Seminary (17 W. Stwosz Street)

In March 2022, the following educational institutions operated in Śródmieście:

1. Kindergartens:
  - Municipal Kindergarten No. 2 (4 T. Kubina Street),
  - Municipal Kindergarten No. 3 (25 Barbary Street),
  - Municipal Kindergarten No. 5 (6 J. Zajączek Street),
  - Municipal Kindergarten No. 33 (23 Powstańców Street),
  - Municipal Kindergarten No. 35 (1 Rybnicka Street),
  - Municipal Kindergarten No. 36 (2 Zacisze Street),
  - Municipal Kindergarten No. 45 (25 Sokolska Street),
2. Primary schools:
  - Józef Piłsudski Primary School No. 1 (18 Jagiellońska Street),
  - Special Primary School No. 7 (5 Szkolna Street),
  - Maria Curie-Skłodowska Primary School No. 10 (23 Sokolska Street),
  - John Paul II Primary School No. 15 with Bilingual Divisions (24 S. Adamski Street),
3. Secondary schools:
  - Maria Konopnicka High School with Bilingual Divisions (6 B. Głowacki Street),
  - Adam Mickiewicz High School (11 A. Mickiewicz Street),
  - Maria Skłodowska-Curie High School with Bilingual Divisions (42 3 Maja Street),
  - Defenders of the Polish Post Office in Gdańsk Technical School No. 8 (16 A. Mickiewicz Street),
4. School complexes:
  - Silesian Technical Educational Establishments (26 Sokolska Street), including:
    - Technical School No. 17,
    - Post-Secondary School No. 8,
  - Emil Szramek Complex of Catholic General Education Schools No. 1 (4 Stanisław Kobyliński Street), including:
    - Catholic Primary School,
    - E. Szramek Catholic High School,
  - Wojciech Korfanty Complex of Economic Schools (3 Raciborska Street), including:
    - Technical School No. 2,
    - Post-Secondary School No. 7,
  - Mikołaj Kopernik Complex of General Education Schools No. 1 (74 H. Sienkiewicz Street), including:
    - Primary School No. 37 with Bilingual Divisions,
    - Mikołaj Kopernik High School with Bilingual Divisions,
5. Other:
  - Moniuszko State General Music School 1st Degree (9 Dąbrówki Street),
  - M. Karłowicz State Music School of 1st and 2nd Degree (16 Teatralna Street),
  - Vocational Training Center (2 Z. Krasiński Street).

In 2012, there were 20 higher education institutions in Katowice, with 90,000 students enrolled, with a large number of them in Śródmieście. In March 2022, the following universities had their headquarters there:

1. Public universities:
  - Karol Szymanowski Academy of Music (3 Zacisze Street),
  - Academy of Fine Arts and Design (37 Raciborska Street),
  - Jerzy Kukuczka Academy of Physical Education (72a Mikołowska Street),
  - Medical University of Silesia (15 J. Poniatowski Street),
  - University of Silesia (12 Bankowa Street),
2. Private universities:
  - Silesian School of Medicine (29 A. Mickiewicz Street),
  - Katowice Institute of Information Technologies (29 A. Mickiewicz Street),
  - Higher School of Occupational Safety Management (8 Bankowa Street),
  - Higher Silesian Theological Seminary (17 W. Stwosz Street).

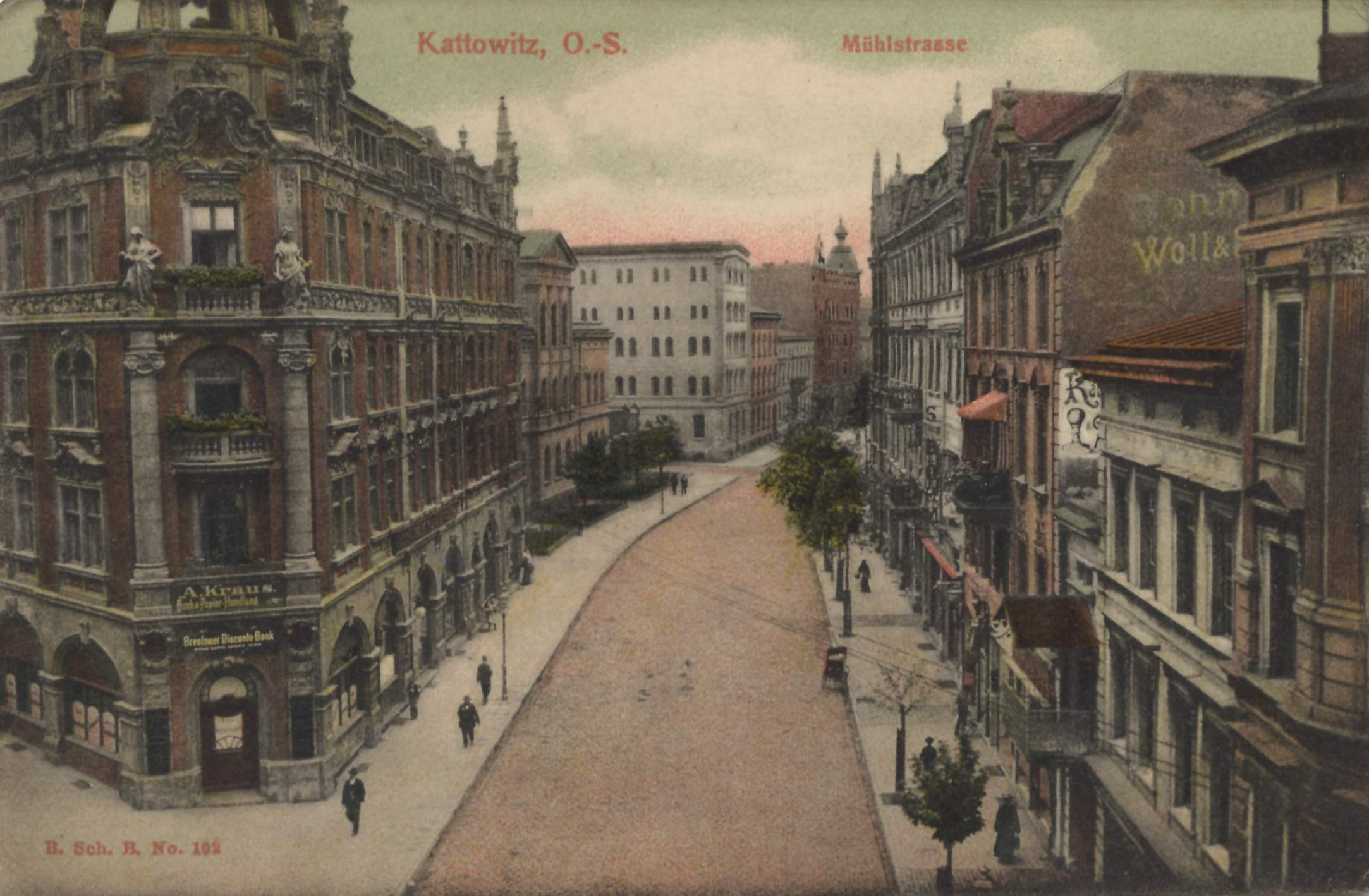
Postcard showing Młyńska Street in 1908; behind the tenement at No. 2 (on the left), a fragment of the former primary school building is visible; today, the Katowice City Hall is located in its place

The first school in what is now Śródmieście was established in 1827 in the area of today's post office building. It was a Catholic school attended by children from Katowice, Brynów, and Katowicka Hałda. In 1855, the building was enlarged and an assistant teacher was hired. In 1868, 617 students attended the school, and the number of teachers was constantly growing. In 1871, a new public school was opened on the site of the current Katowice City Hall on Młyńska Street. It had 12 classrooms and was attended by 838 students at the time.

The establishmento of an Evangelical school followed the assignment of a pastor to Katowice in 1854. Initially, teaching for Evangelical children took the form of Sunday school, and the first schoolroom with a teacher's apartment was opened on 3 March 1856 on what is now Młyńska Street. Due to the steady increase in the number of students, a decision was made in 1858 to build a new school near the Evangelical church. The building was opened on 27 August 1860 at today's 5 Szkolna Street, and was initially attended by 89 children.

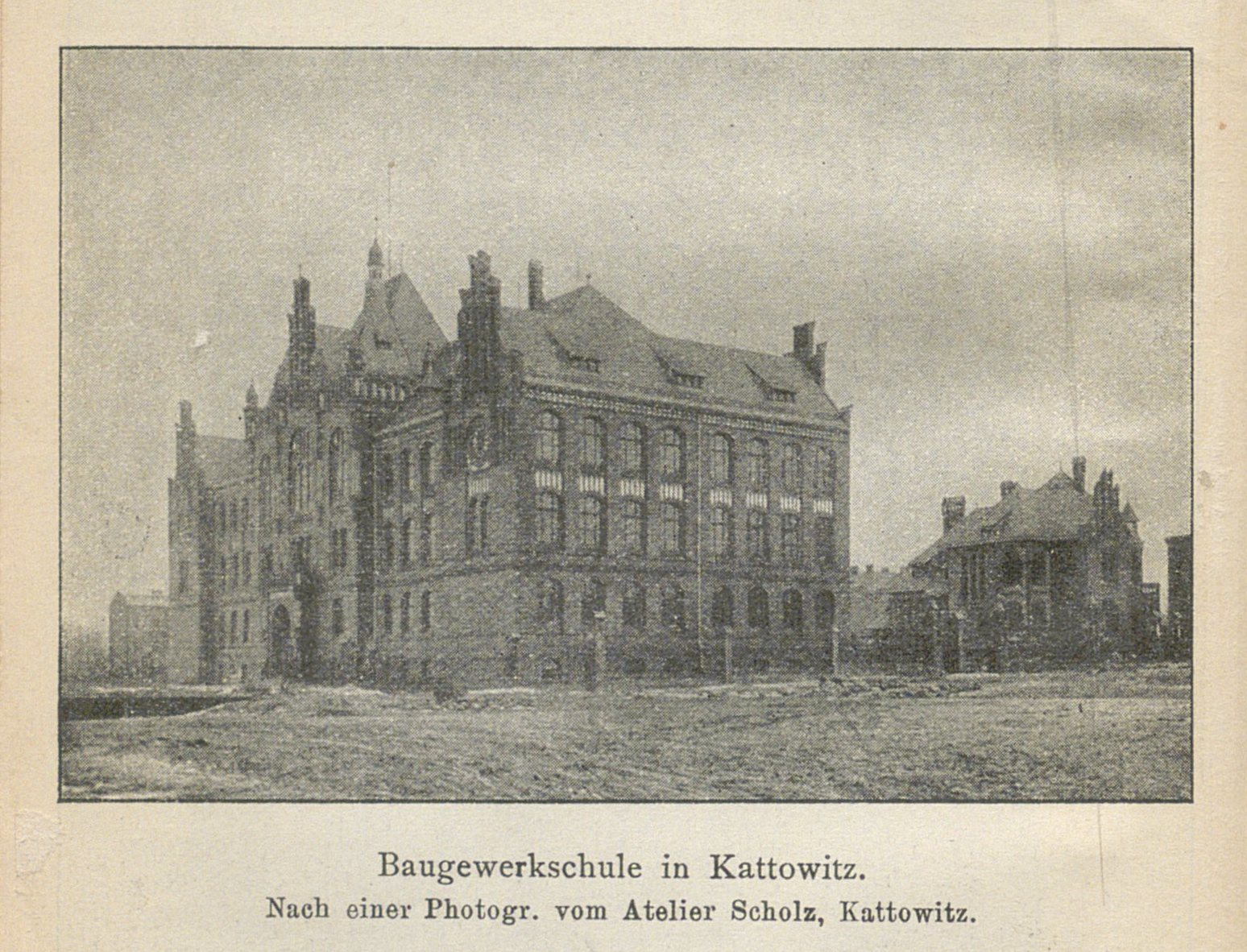
Building of the former Royal Construction School – currently the headquarters of the Karol Szymanowski Academy of Music (3 Zacisze Street)

In 1892, a school was constructed on today's Stawowa Street, which after World War II housed Primary School No. 10. The building, which had 24 classrooms, initially served a girls' primary school. On 1 October 1899, the Royal School of Construction was established in Katowice. The school obtained its own premises on 20 April 1901; today it is the building of the Academy of Music. Between 1909 and 1910, the headquarters of a secondary school for boys was established at what is now 9 Szkolna Street, and a secondary school for girls was expanded – the current building of the M. Skłodowska-Curie High School at 3 Maja Street. In 1910, construction began on another building for lower education at today's B. Głowacki Street – the current seat of the M. Konopnicka High School.

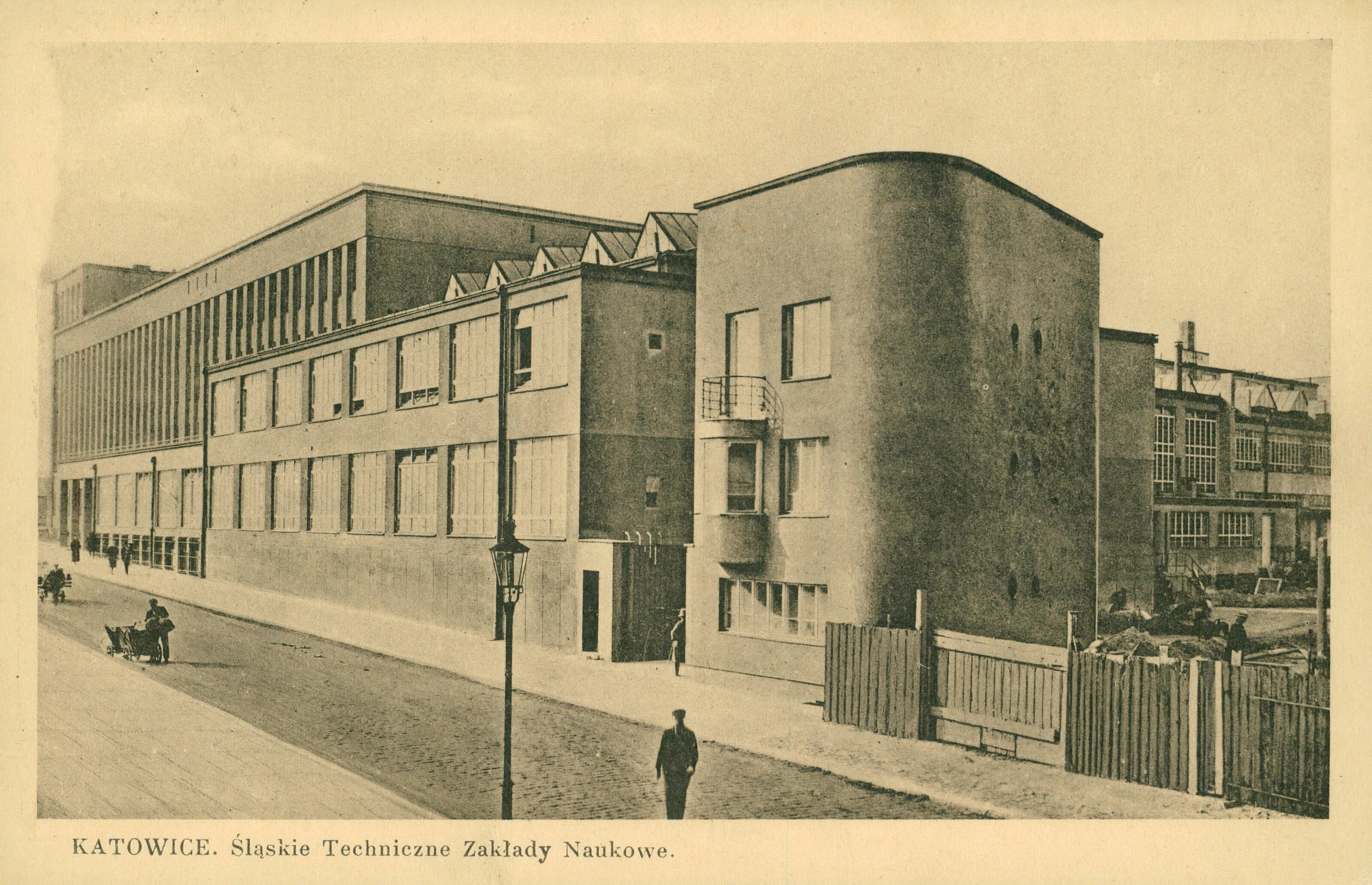
Former building of the Silesian Technical Educational Establishments in 1932 (view from Graniczna Street)

In 1883, a secondary school for boys was established. The school was located in a building previously used as an Evangelical school, purchased by the city. The school was eventually moved to a building at what is now 9 Szkolna Street, and in 1910, construction of a new building was completed. The idea of creating a secondary school for girls emerged in 1895. It was established on 19 April 1900 at today's Stawowa Street, and in 1902 it moved to a building at what is now Młyńska Street. On 1 August 1906, the school was given a renovated building that had previously housed a secondary school at present-day Szkolna Street.

On 14 February 1871, the regency in Opole approved the decision to establish a secondary school. The school was named Municipal Gymnasium and was originally located in a building occupied by a higher education institution for women, with four rooms allocated for it. At the same time, construction began on a new school building, completed in 1874. Due to the growing number of students, the city council decided to build a new school. It was officially opened on 9 October 1900, and is now the building of 3rd High School.

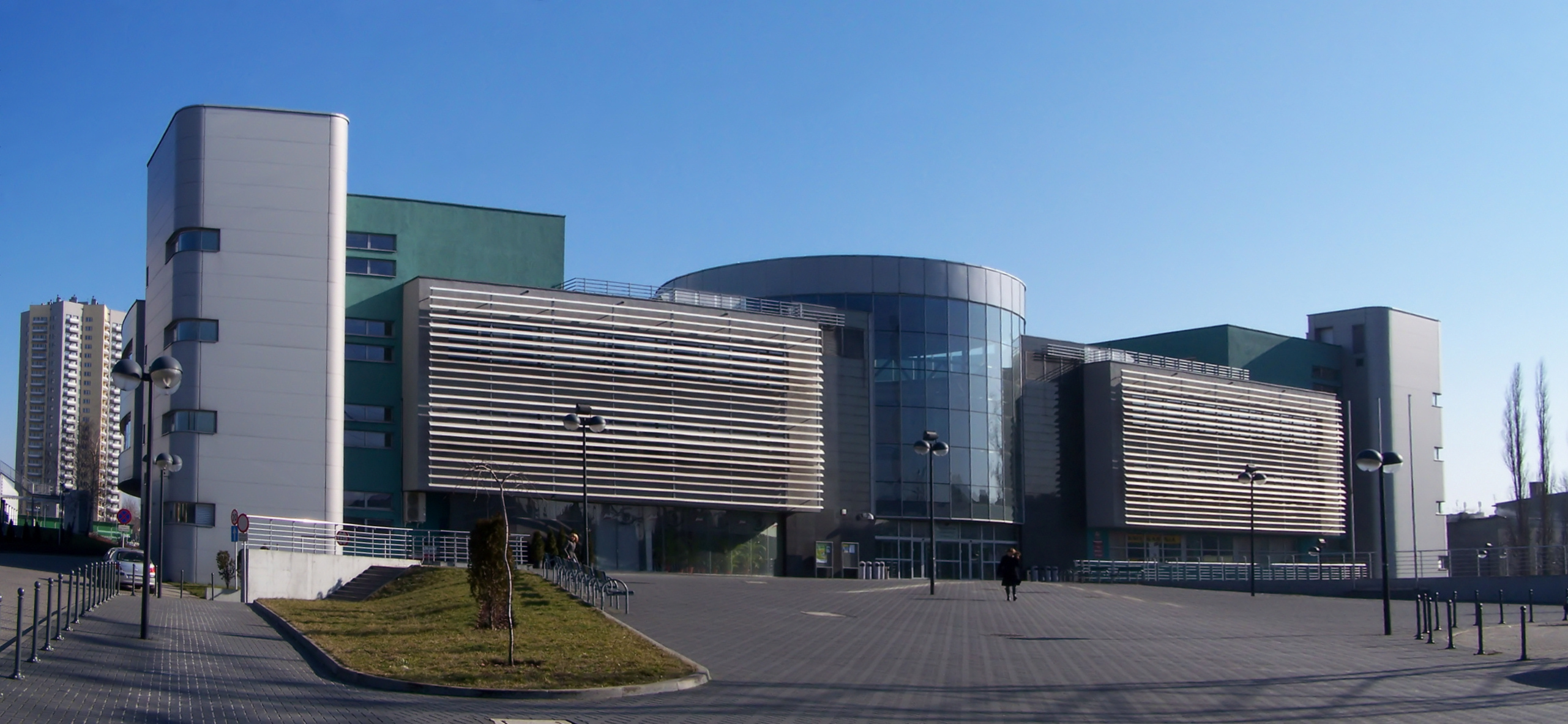
Headquarters of the Faculty of Law and Administration of the University of Silesia (11b Bankowa Street)

After the incorporation of Śródmieście into Poland in 1922, work was underway to implement educational institutions with Polish as the language of instruction. On 14 September 1922, a classical gymnasium under the name State Municipal Reformed Classical Gymnasium was inaugurated, later adopting the name State Gymnasium and High School in Katowice after educational reforms. In the interwar period, the second secondary school was the Municipal Higher Technical School. In 1924, it was renamed the Municipal Mathematics and Natural Sciences Gymnasium. In 1922, the girls' high school was also reorganized, changing it into the Municipal Girls' Gymnasium.

In the interwar period, a network of vocational schools, scientific institutes, and higher education institutions without academic rights developed. In 1931, a resolution of the Silesian Parliament established the Silesian Technical Scientific Institutes, which included many lower and secondary vocational schools of various specializations. In 1928, the Pedagogical Institute was established, which operated until the outbreak of World War II. In the same year, the State Music Conservatory was also opened, with 150 students in 1939. Among the scientific institutions operating at that time, the Silesian Institute, established in 1934, had the widest scope of activity. In 1924, the Library of the Silesian Parliament, developed over the years, was reorganized into the Silesian Public Library in 1936.

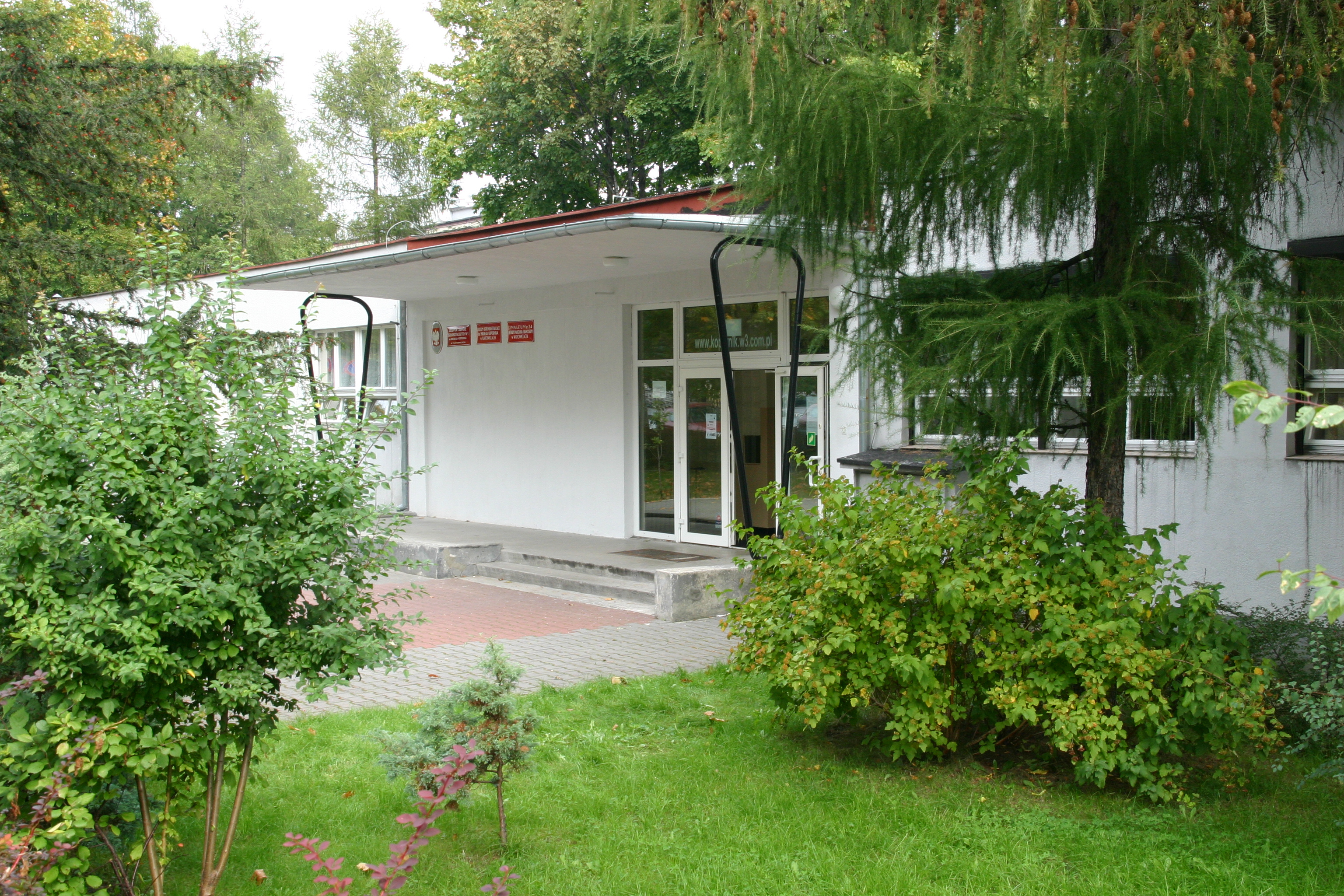
Building of the Mikołaj Kopernik Complex of General Education Schools (74 H. Sienkiewicz Street)

After 1945, efforts were made to rebuild schooling in the city, and schools arose in the first period in the same places as in 1939. In 1948, the Municipal Gymnasium and Girls' High School was divided into three parts, and in the same year the State Gymnasium was transformed into Primary School and High School No. 3. In the 1967/1968 school year, both institutions were separated, renaming the secondary school the Adam Mickiewicz High School. In 1959, the Central Committee of the Polish United Workers' Party launched the campaign to build a thousand schools for the celebrations of the Millennium of the Polish State. In 1960, employees of the Municipal Headquarters of the Citizens' Militia decided to fund a new school from their own contributions for the 1st M. Kopernik High School. It was opened on 4 February 1966.

In September 1945, the Silesian Music Conservatory was changed into the State Higher Music School, and in the same year, the State School of Fine Arts began operating, obtaining academic rights in 1947. In 1946, the Higher Pedagogical School was established, which was moved to Łódź in 1947. The Higher Pedagogical School was reorganized in 1950. These universities, along with others outside Śródmieście, were the first stage of the development of post-war higher education in Katowice. In 1964, a branch of the Jagiellonian University was established, and as a result of its merger with the Higher Pedagogical School in the academic year 1968/1969, the University of Silesia began operating, consisting in its first year of four faculties offering nine fields of study. In 1970, the Academy of Physical Education was established.

After 1989, the number of students attending universities in Śródmieście increased. The first private school in Katowice was also established there – the Jerzy Ziętek Silesian School of Management, founded in 1993. In 2003, the building of the Faculty of Law and Administration of the University of Silesia was put into use, and in 2007, the construction of the Symfonia Music Education Center of the Karol Szymanowski Academy of Music was completed. The city also co-financed investments at other universities. On 12 October 2012, a library shared by the University of Silesia and the University of Economics was opened at 11a Bankowa Street – the Scientific Information Centre and Academic Library.

== Culture ==
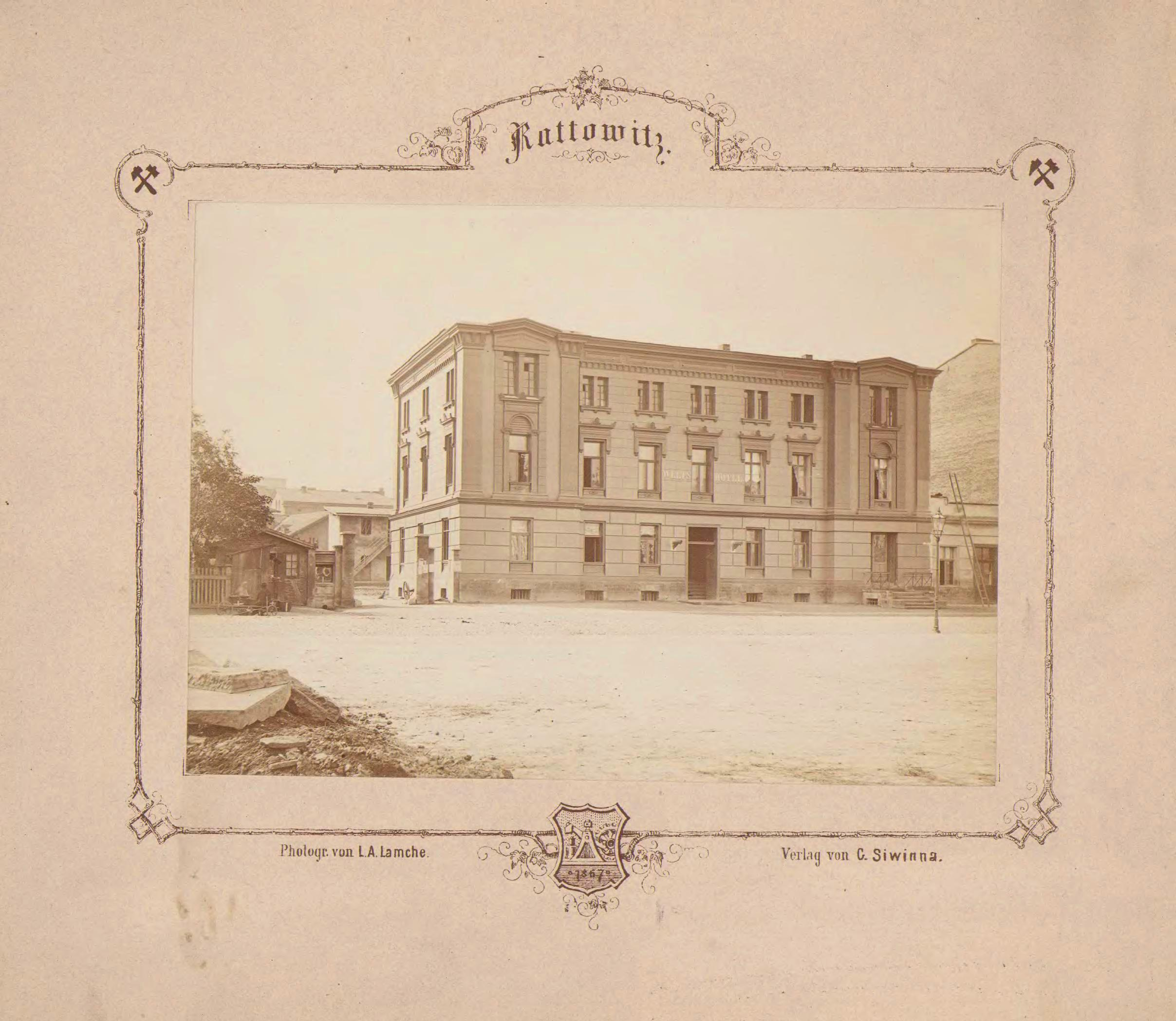
Welt Hotel – one of the first places in Katowice where concerts were organized

Śródmieście is home to many cultural institutions, including those with a supra-regional reach. The city itself is an important center for music and the arts. The Silesian Philharmonic (2 Sokolska Street), Karol Szymanowski Academy of Music (3 Zacisze Street), and the Academy of Fine Arts and Design (37 Raciborska Street), as well as numerous art galleries, including the BWA Gallery of Contemporary Art (6 W. Korfanty Avenue), have their headquarters in Śródmieście. The building at 2 Silesian Parliament Square is home to the Katowice City of Gardens – Krystyna Bochenek Cultural Institution. It was arranged by the city of Katowice and organizes a number of cultural events, including the city's birthday celebration "I Love Katowice", as well as provides organizational support on behalf of the city for events such as the Off Festival, Tauron Nowa Muzyka, and the Rawa Blues Festival. The Korez Theater and the Museum of Computer and Information Technology are located at the headquarters of the City of Gardens.

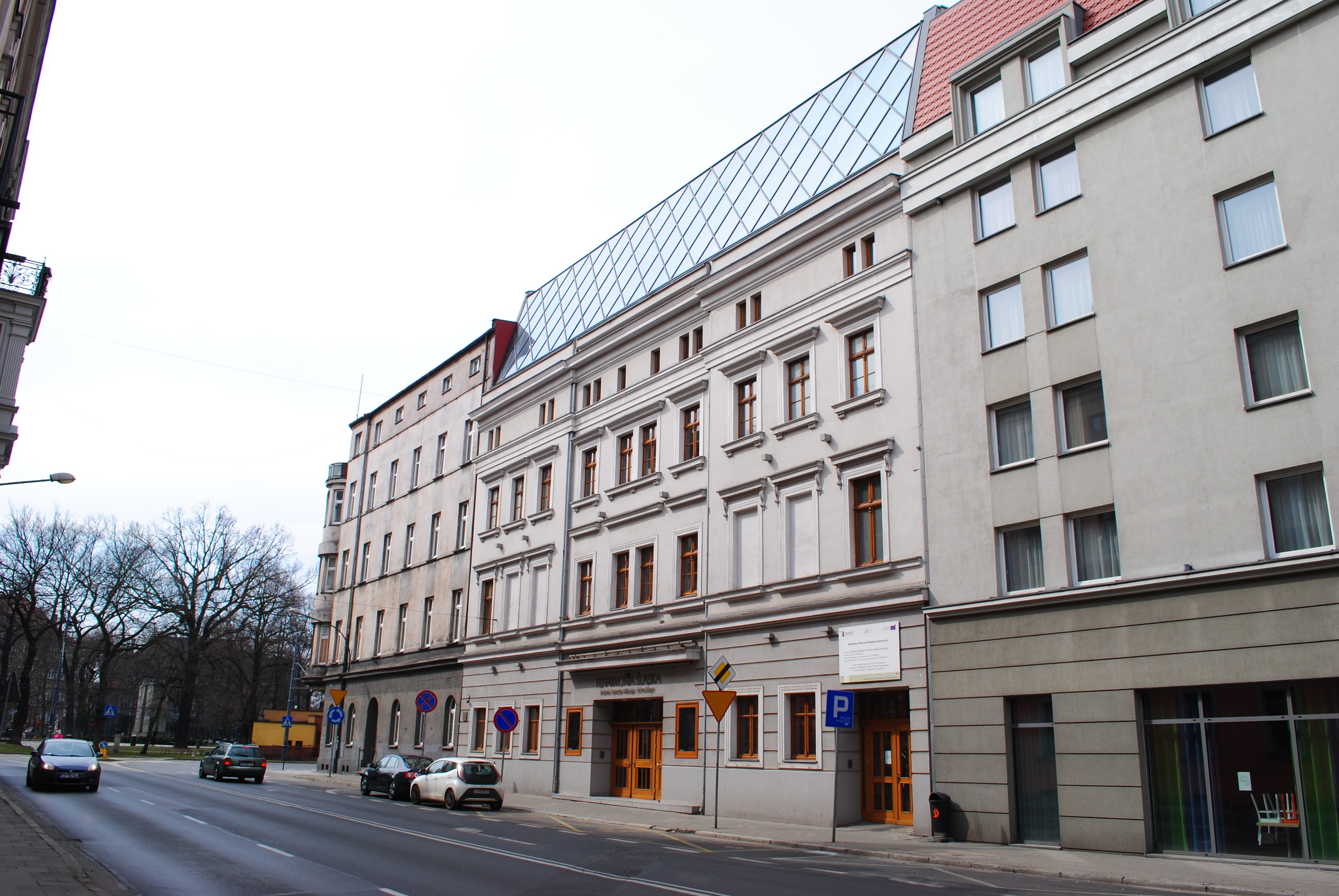
Headquarters of the Silesian Philharmonic (2 Sokolska Street)

The beginnings of musical life in what is now Śródmieście date back to the mid-19th century. Concerts at that time were organized at venues such as the Welt Hotel, and after 1855 also in the newly built Hotel de Prusse with a theater hall. Richard Holtze founded the Singing Society (German: Männergesangverein) in 1857, and in 1867 he co-founded the Music Society. The beginnings of the professional music movement in Katowice are associated with Oskar Meister, who arrived in the city in 1872. He founded the Music Institute, and its graduates established a number of musical and choral ensembles. In 1873, the Reichshalle building (now the Silesian Philharmonic) was opened, where numerous concerts were organized.

The origins of theater in Katowice date back to the turn of the 19th and 20th centuries. The construction of the theater was planned as early as 1 April 1900, but the actual preparatory work on the construction of the building at the Market Square began in July 1906. The official opening of the Silesian Theatre took place on 2 October 1907, and during the inauguration, Friedrich Schiller's drama William Tell, directed by theatre director Emmanuel Raul, was presented.

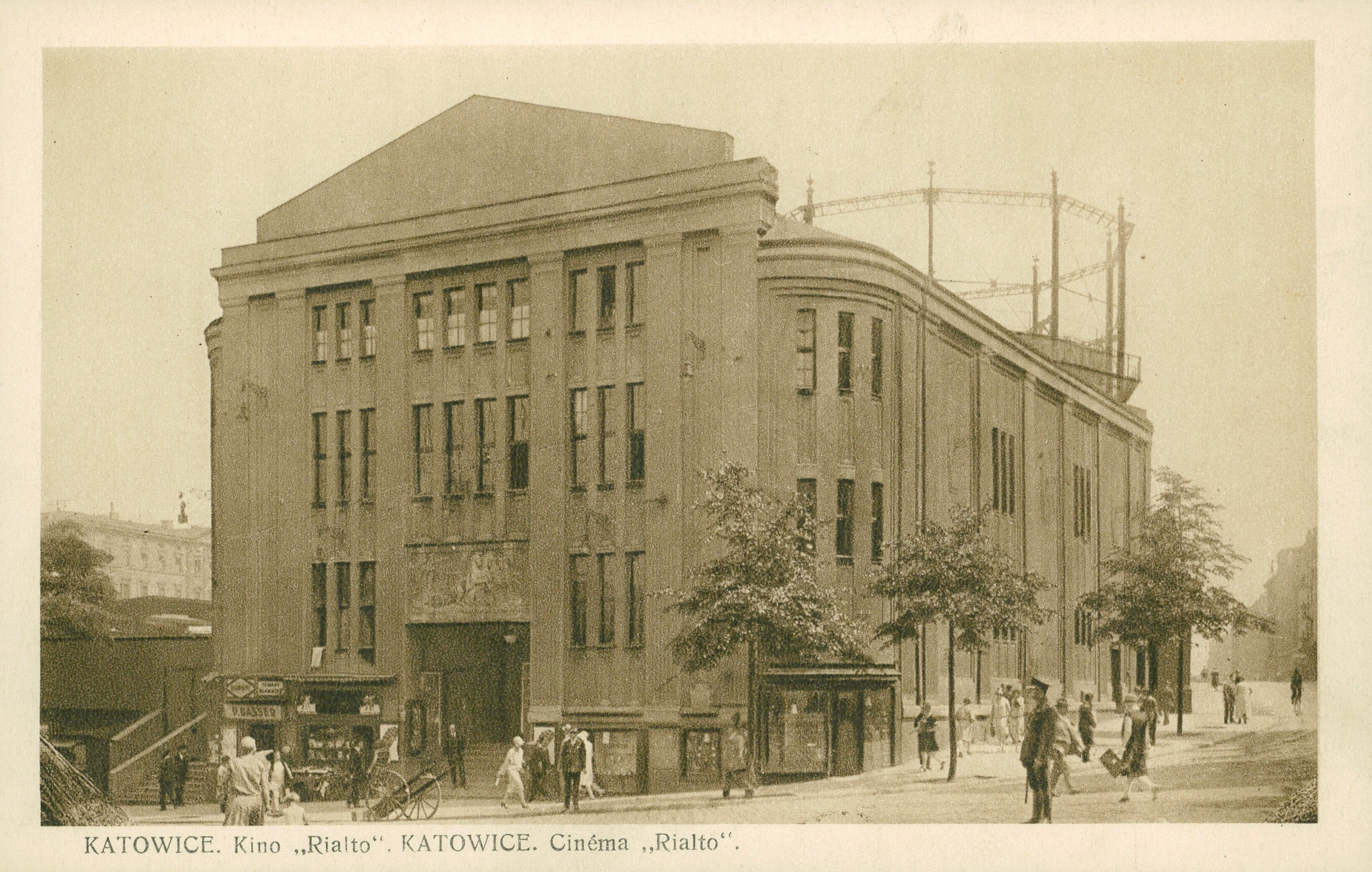
Current Rialto Cinema Theatre in the interwar period (24 St. Jan Street)

The first permanent cinema in today's Śródmieście, the Welt-Theater, was established on 10 March 1907 on what is now Warszawska Street . Later that same year, at the end of March, the Grand Kinematografh Cinema was opened on present-day 3 Maja Street. Both cinemas were established in converted outbuildings, but they were closed in 1911 and 1915, respectively. The first cinema built from scratch was officially opened on 25 December 1909 on the site of today's Światowid Cinema. The builder, Martin Tichauer, who had previously built the Colosseum Cinema for Eckerich, constructed his own cinema, which was completed in 1912. The then Kamerlichspiele Cinema, known as Rialto from 1928, was opened on 15 January 1913 and was advertised at the time as the largest in Upper Silesia, with a capacity of 1,000 people.

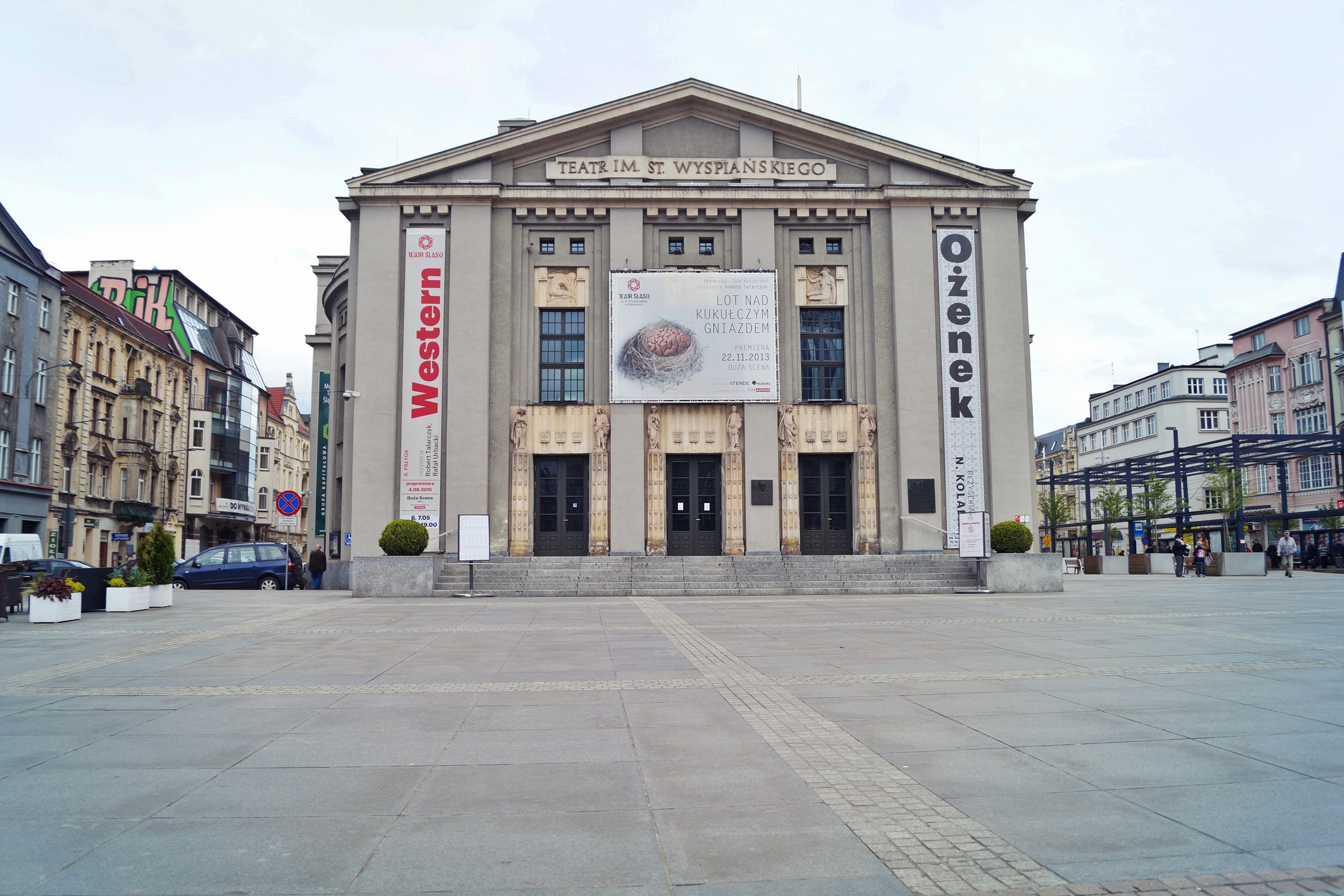
Headquarters of the Silesian Theatre (2 Market Square)

In 1922, the Polish Theatre was established in Katowice, named after Stanisław Wyspiański in 1937. In addition to its headquarters, the theater staged performances in other Upper Silesian cities on both sides of the state border. Cultural associations were also established in the interwar period. One of the first was the Silesian Writers' Circle, founded in 1929 and later transformed into the Artistic and Literary Union. In the same year, the Trade Union of Artists in Upper Silesia was also established. In the interwar period, the Silesian Museum was opened in Śródmieście, formally established on 23 January 1929 as a monument to the 10th anniversary of Poland's rebirth, and the first exhibitions were organized in 1930. The museum gathered a large collection of Silesian historical memorabilia and art, giving rise to the first gallery of Polish painting in Upper Silesia. In 1934, the Museum Construction Office was established, and the opening of the new building was planned for spring of 1940. It was destroyed during World War II.

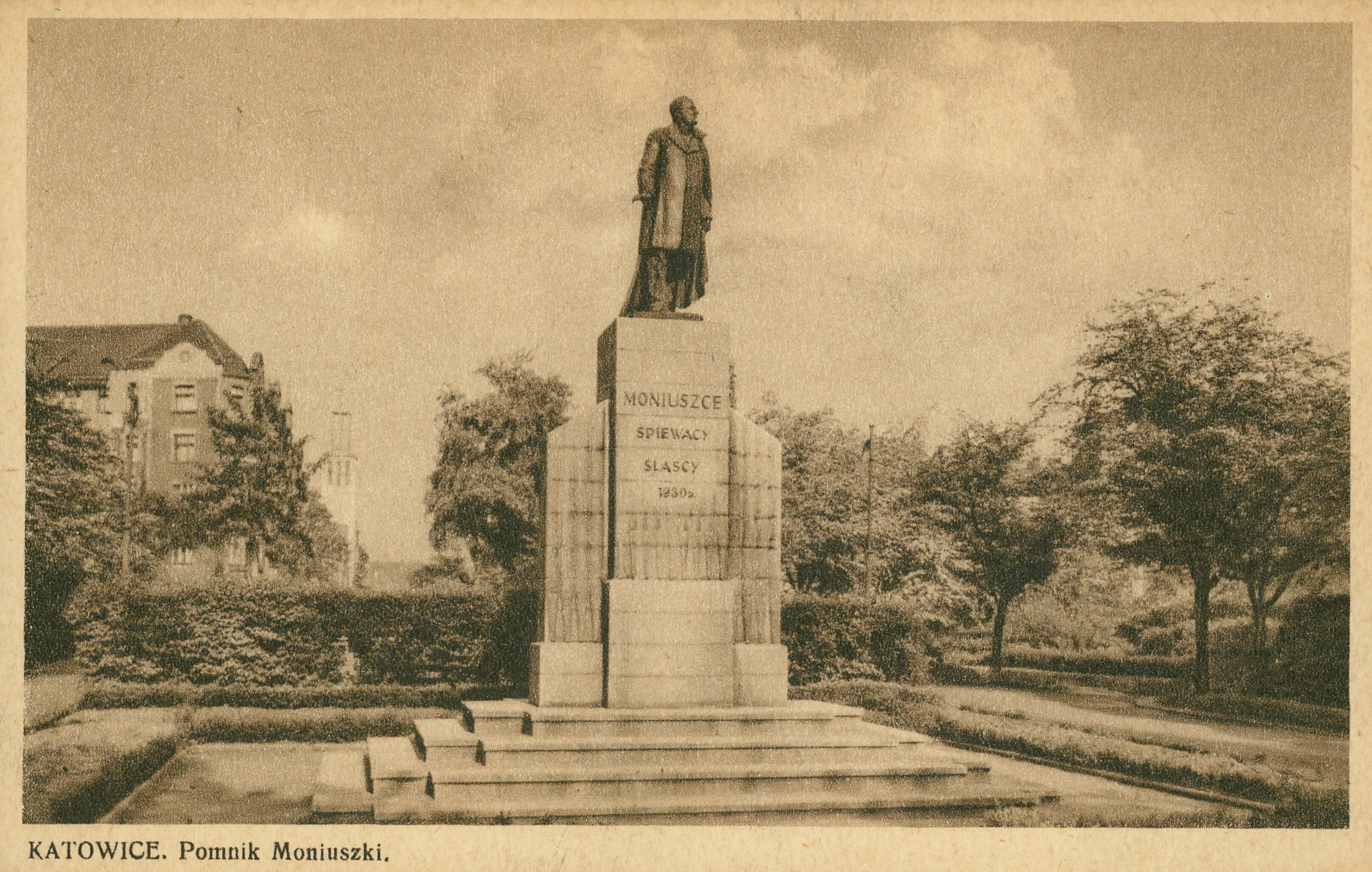
Stanisław Moniuszko Monument at K. Miarka Square in 1938

In 1910, the Union of Silesian Singing Circles was established, which after ten years became one of the leading institutions of its kind in Poland. It became particularly active when Stefan Marian Stoiński took up the position of union conductor. On his initiative, a monument to Stanisław Moniuszko was unveiled in 1930 on K. Miarka Square during the National Singers' Convention. In the same year, the Lower Music School was established, followed by the Music High School in 1937. The Silesian Music Conservatory, founded in 1929 on the initiative of Witold Friemann, was the first institution of higher education in Upper Silesia. From 1934, the conservatory operated in a building at 33 Wojewódzka Street.

In 1928, a new Capitol Cinema was opened at 3 Plebiscytowa Street, and its owner, Alojzy Potempa, turned it into a full entertainment complex with a restaurant, billiard rooms, and a cabaret. In 1930, the Rialto Cinema hosted the first screening of a sound film in Katowice – The Singing Fool. On 15 November 1938, the Zorza Cinema was opened in the Silesian Insurgent House at J. Matejko Street.

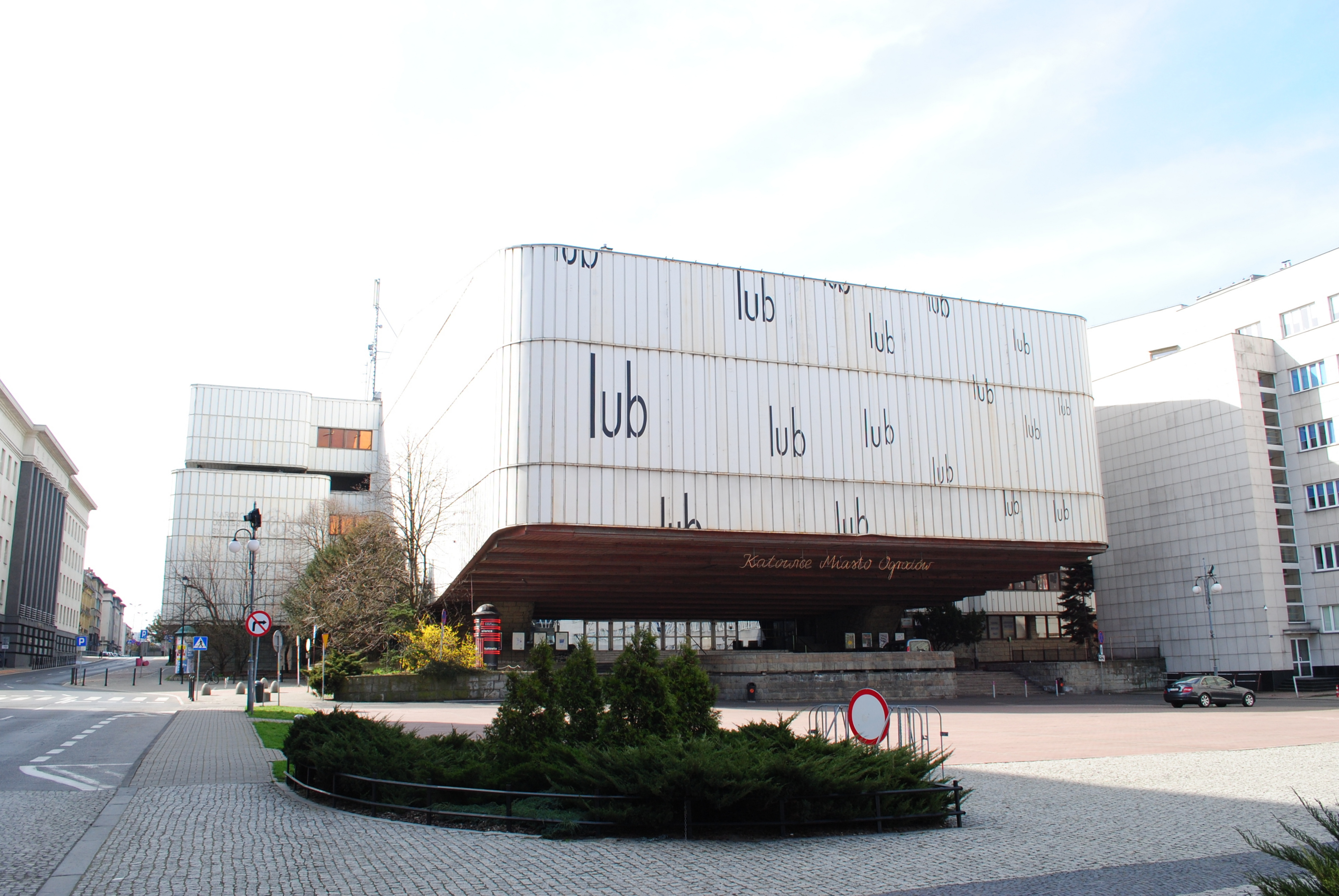
Headquarters of the Katowice City of Gardens – Krystyna Bochenek Cultural Institution at 2 Silesian Parliament Square – former headquarters of the Polish National Radio Symphony Orchestra

During Polska Ludowa period, musical culture developed most significantly. In 1945, the Polish National Radio Symphony Orchestra and the Silesian Philharmonic were established. After World War II, the Contemporary Gallery of the Art Exhibition Bureau was also opened, with its own exhibition hall; in 1975 it organized a total of 14 exhibition events. The first post-war museum in Śródmieście, the Social Museum of the History of Katowice, was opened in 1976. In 1981, the Museum of the History of Katowice was established as a branch of the Upper Silesian Museum in Bytom, and two years later, the institution became independent.

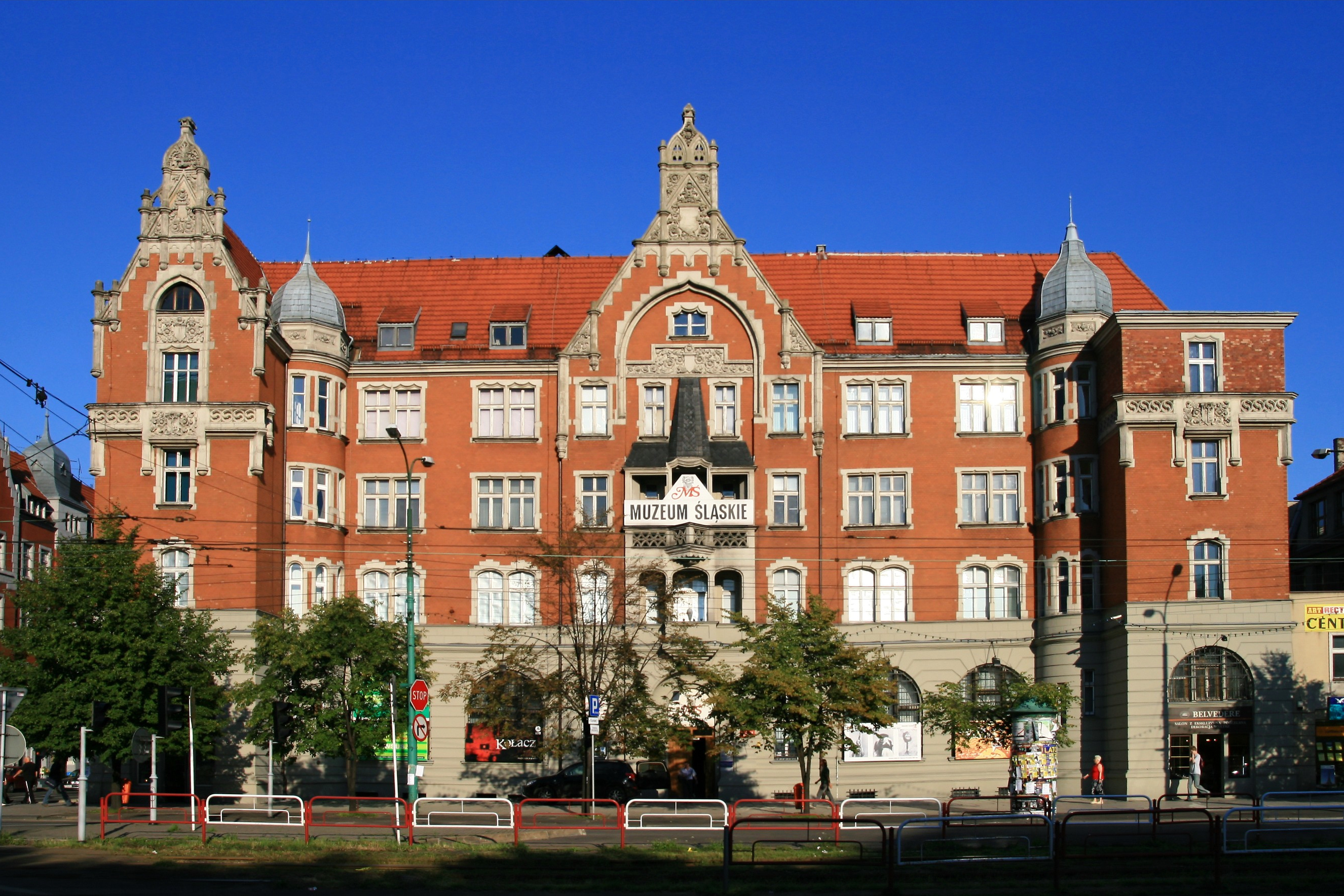
Former headquarters of the Silesian Museum (3 W. Korfanty Avenue)

On 28 January 1981, the Social Committee for the Reconstruction of the Silesian Museum was established, headed by Professor Kazimierz Popiołek. The committee requested that the former Grand Hotel building be transferred to the museum. The Silesian Museum began operating in 1984, undertaking the renovation of the building and organizational work. The museum drew on pre-war traditions. In 1985, the Archdiocesan Museum was established, collecting sacred art.

After the political changes of 1989, the cultural offer of Śródmieście developed, and many renovation and investment works were carried out in cultural facilities. Among others, the buildings of the Silesian Theatre, the Silesian Philharmonic, the Youth Palace, and the Upper Silesian Culture Center were modernized. The Zorza Cinema operated as a repertory cinema until 2003, when it was converted into music clubs. When Zorza was closed down, only two of the former Śródmieście's cinemas remained: Rialto and Światowid.

== Religion ==
=== Roman Catholic Church ===
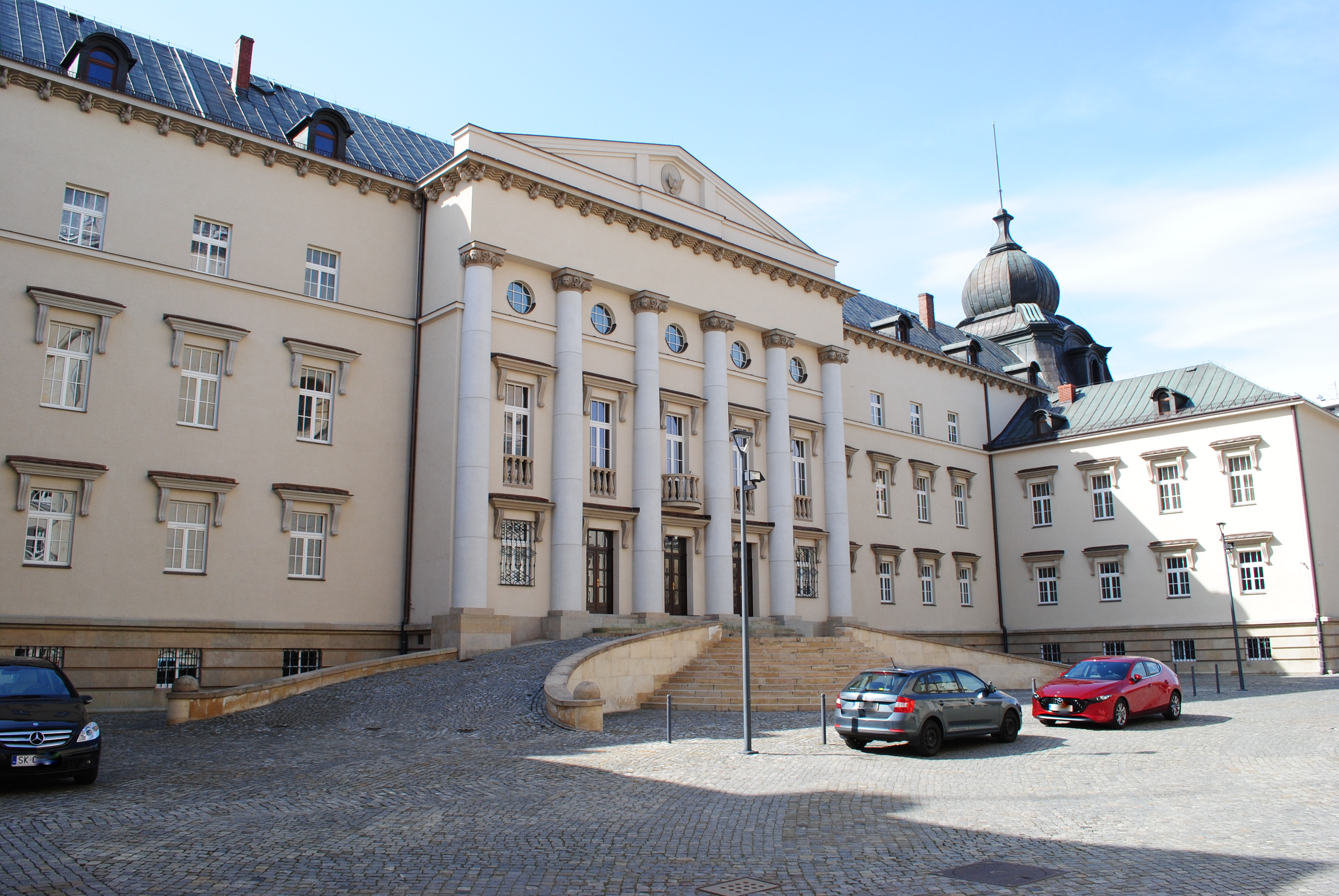
Headquarters of the metropolitan curia of the Archdiocese of Katowice – Bishop's Palace (39 H. Jordan Street)

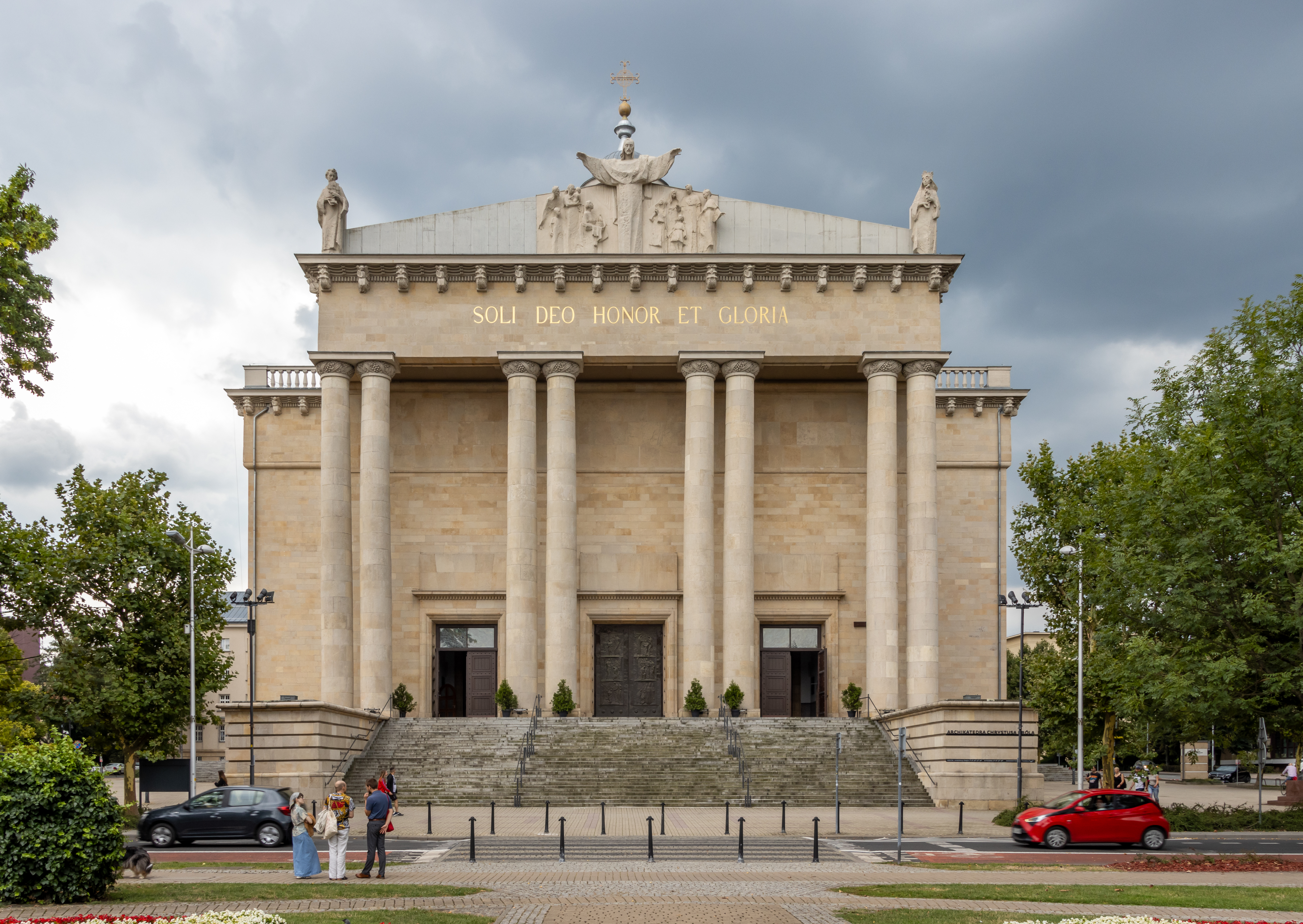
Cathedral of Christ the King from St. John Paul II Square

Śródmieście is the seat of the Roman Catholic Archdiocese of Katowice. Roman Catholic parishes in the district are part of the Katowice-Śródmieście deanery, which includes a total of 10 parishes from Śródmieście, Koszutka, Zawodzie, and part of Brynów. Among them, the following parish communities are based in the district:

- Cathedral Parish of Christ the King (49a Plebiscytowa Street),
- Garrison Parish of St. Casimir (20 M. Skłodowska-Curie Street),
- Parish of the Immaculate Conception of Mary (1 E. Szramek Square),
- Parish of Saints Peter and Paul (32 Mikołowska Street),
- Parish of the Transfiguration (12 Sokolska Street).

Roman Catholic parishes within the boundaries of Śródmieście have a total of two cemeteries:

- Cemetery of the Parish of Saints Peter and Paul at H. Sienkiewicz Street (4.2 ha),
- Cemetery of the Parish of the Immaculate Conception of Mary at Francuska Street (2.4 ha).

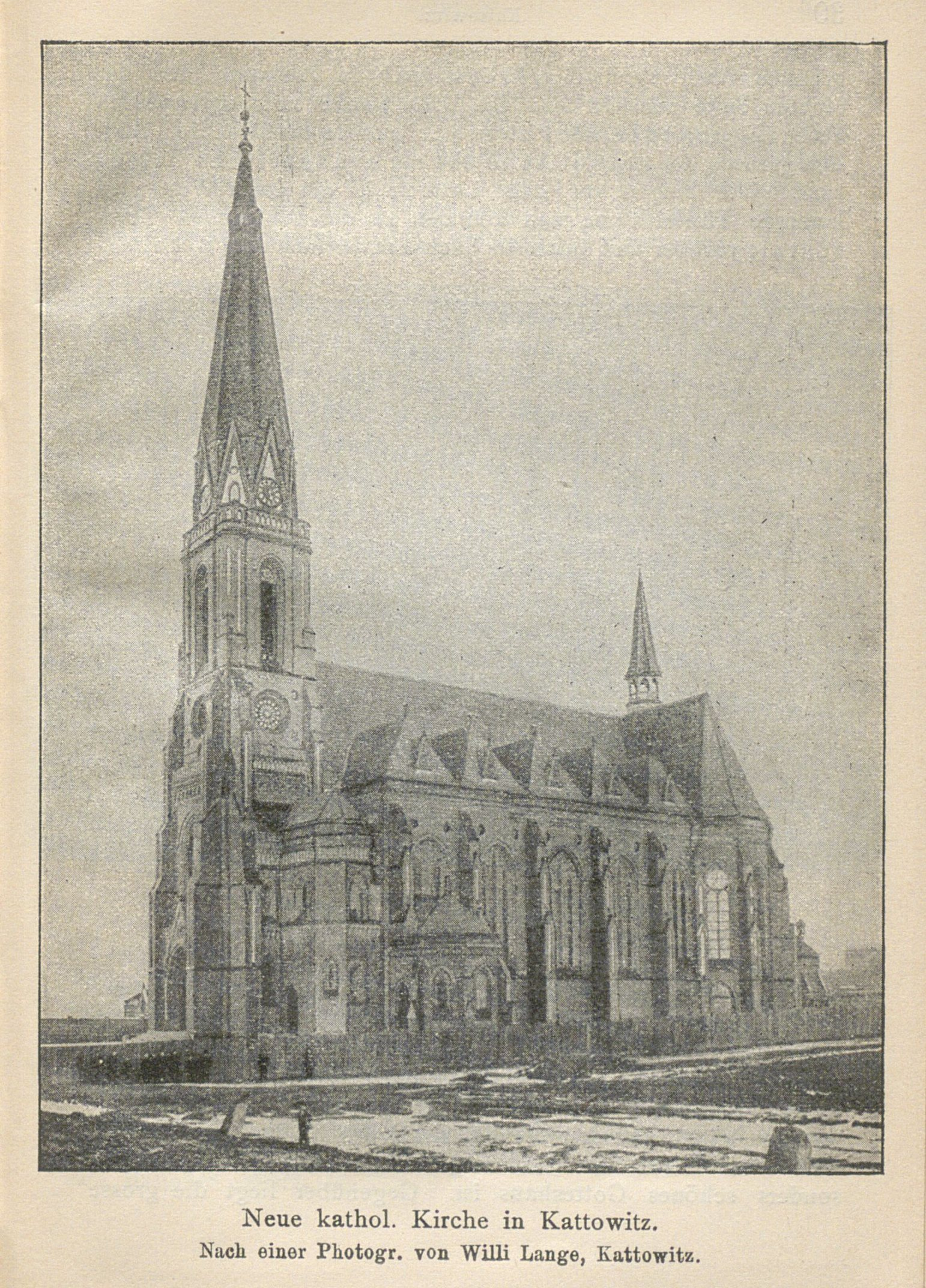
Church of the Saints Peter and Paul in 1904

Originally, the Roman Catholic inhabitants of what is now Śródmieście belonged to the Bogucice parish, established in the 14th century. Father Krzysztof Kazimierski – a delegate of the Bishop of Kraków, Cardinal Jerzy Radziwiłł – who visited the parish in Bogucice mentioned the establishment of a new village of Katowice, which was part of the Bogucice parish. The parish was part of the Bytom deanery in the Diocese of Kraków, and from the 19th century, the Diocese of Wrocław. In 1860, the first Catholic church in Śródmieście, the Church of the Immaculate Conception of Mary, was built as a temporary structure. It was erected in the area of Freedom Square, next to the present building of the Silesian Philharmonic. About 3,100 faithful from Brynów and Katowice, as well as from Załęże, Załęska Hałda, and Katowicka Hałda, began attending it. On 31 August 1862, construction of St. Mary's Church began on today's Warszawska Street. The church was dedicated by Bishop Adrian Włodarski on 20 November 1870. The first parish in Katowice was established on 14 September 1873, and its first parson was Father Wiktor Schmidt.

Between 1898 and 1902, Father Schmidt led the construction of another church in Katowice, the Church of the Saints Peter and Paul, on today's Mikołowska Street. The area of the curacy was separated entirely from the Parish of the Immaculate Conception of Mary. From 1922, the church served as the sub-cathedral of the Apostolic Administration, and from 1925, of the Diocese of Katowice. The garrison Church of St. Casimir was built within the boundaries of the Parish of Saints Peter and Paul between 1930 and 1933. It was dedicated by the field bishop of the Polish Army, Józef Gawlina.

In July 1938, Silesian Voivode, Michał Grażyński, handed over the church owned by the Old Catholics to the Parish of the Immaculate Conception of Mary. It was renamed the Church of Transfiguration. On 15 March 1940, a local parish was established there. The first curate, and later parson, was Father Henryk Proksch. The church was damaged by an air raid in January 1945. Between 1975 and 1978, it was expanded and dedicated on 3 September 1978 by Bishop Herbert Bednorz.

On 5 June 1927, on the feast of Pentecost, the second Bishop of Katowice, Arkadiusz Lisiecki, symbolically began the construction of the Cathedral of Christ the King. The church was dedicated on 30 October 1955, and on 1 August 1957, Cardinal Stefan Wyszyński, by decree, transferred the rights of the cathedral church to the newly built Church of Christ the King. On 20 December 1957, Bishop Stanisław Adamski established the Parish of Christ the King. The cathedral was visited by Pope John Paul II during his second papal pilgrimage to Poland on 20 June 1983.

On 26 August 2012, Archbishop of Katowice, Wiktor Skworc, handed over the Parish of the Transfiguration to the Dominican Order, allowing them to provide pastoral care in the area. On the same day, by decree of the order's general, Father Bruno Cadoré, the House of the Transfiguration of the Polish Province of the Order of Preachers was established in Katowice.

=== Evangelical-Augsburg Church ===
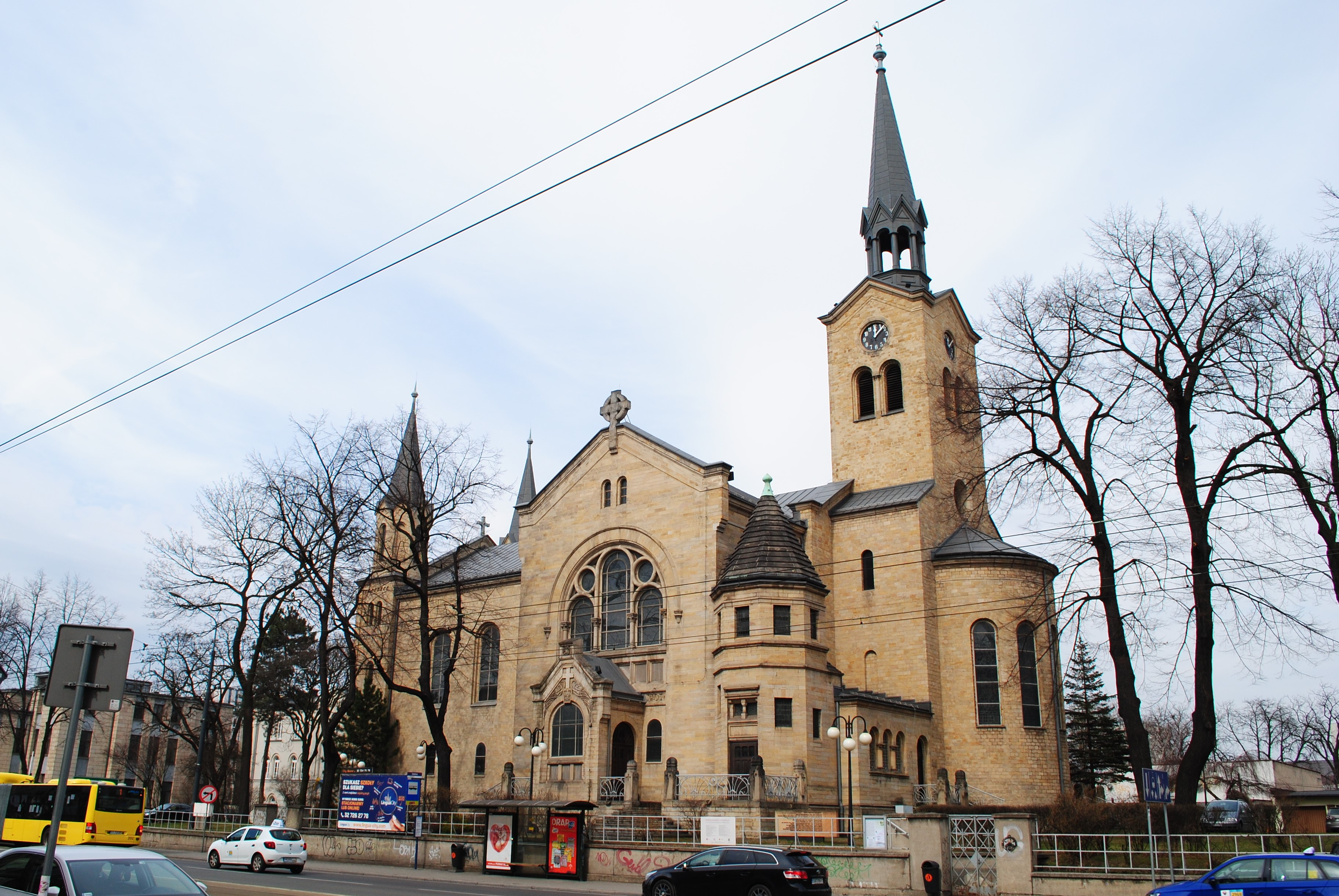
Church of the Resurrection viewed from Warszawska Street

Śródmieście is the seat of the authorities of the Evangelical Diocese of Katowice, and the home to one of Katowice's two Evangelical-Augsburg parishes at 18 Warszawska Street. The parish has its own cemetery with an area of 1.9 ha on Francuska Street.

The first parish community in contemporary Śródmieście was organized by Evangelicals in 1854, and among them were the most influential residents of Katowice at the time, including Hubert von Tiele-Winckler, Friedrich Grundmann, and Richard Holtze. The further development of the Evangelical community was linked to the migration of skilled people of various professions to Katowice. In 1855, a total of 586 Evangelicals lived in the city. On 17 July 1856, a ceremony was held to lay the cornerstone for the Church of the Resurrection, and it was dedicated on 24 September 1858. The Evangelical church was the first brick religious building in Katowice.

=== Judaism ===
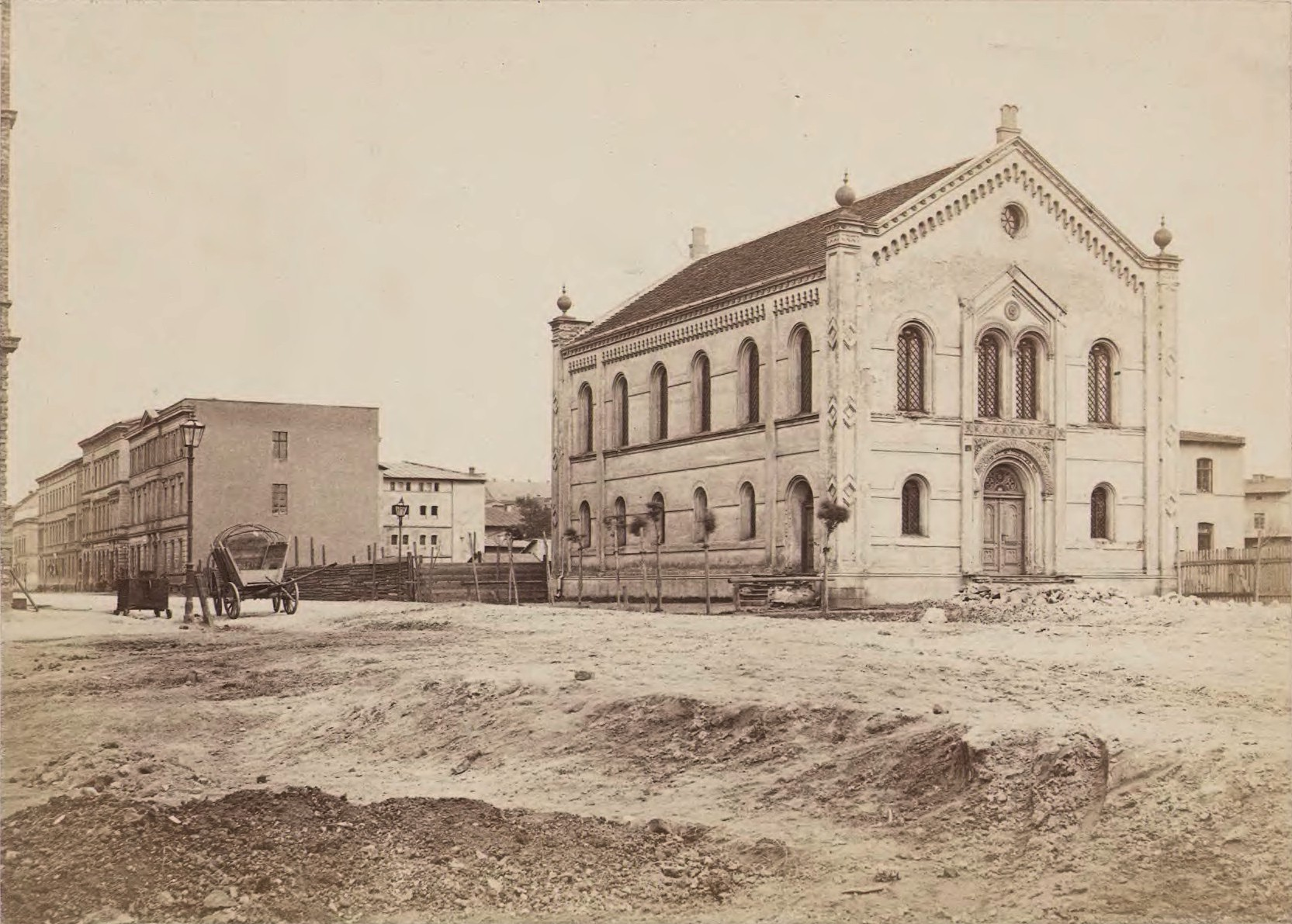
Old Synagogue in Katowice around 1872 (before expansion)

The Jewish Religious Community operates in Śródmieście since 1993 and has about 200 members. It is located at 16 3 Maja Street and has houses of prayer in Katowice and Gliwice, including the Chaskel Besser House of Prayer at 16 3 Maja Street. It has been operating since March 2010 after moving from its former headquarters on Młyńska Street. Services are held there on all Sabbaths and holidays. The community manages a 1.0-hectare Jewish Cemetery on Kozielska Street.

Jews living in Śródmieście originally belonged to the community in Mysłowice. In 1861, the company of Ignatz Grünfeld built the first synagogue in Katowice, known as the Old Synagogue, on what is now J. Słowacki Street. Its consecration took place on 4 July 1865, and on 1 January 1866, the Katowice Jewish community was established. In 1896, the Jewish community council decided to build a new synagogue, which was planned on present A. Mickiewicz Street. The consecration of the later Great Synagogue, also built by Ignatz Grünfeld's company, took place on 12 September 1900. The Jewish community purchased a plot of land for its own cemetery on today's Kozielska Street in 1868. On 9 September of the same year, the cemetery was opened.

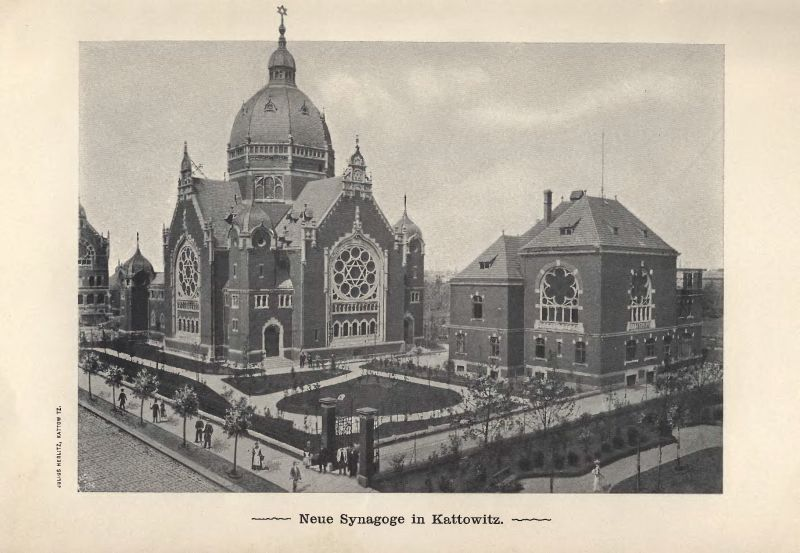
Great Synagogue in the pre-war period

On 6–11 November 1884, the Katowice Conference was held in contemporary Śródmieście. It was a meeting organized by the Lovers of Zion, during which a decision was made to establish institutions supporting Jewish agriculture and settlement in Palestine. The Katowice Conference was the first large gathering of Zionists of this kind, whose actions led to the establishment of Israel in 1948.

As a result of deportations and mass escapes during World War II, only 27 Jews remained in Katowice in October 1940. After World War II, the first representation of Jewish residents of the Silesian Voivodeship was the Voivodeship Jewish Committee, established on 4 February 1945, and moved on 18 April of the same year to the building at 10 A. Mielęcki Street. In March 2010, the house of prayer for Katowice Jews was moved to 16 3 Maja Street, and on 1 September of the same year, it was named after Rabbi Chaskel Besser, who was born in Katowice.

=== Other denominations ===
As of March 2022, the following denominations also have their communities in Śródmieście:

- Islam – Center of Islamic Culture in Katowice (50a Warszawska Street),
- Seventh-day Adventist Church – Seventh-day Adventist Church Congregation in Katowice (1 F. Chopin Street),
- Church of Christ – Christian Community in Katowice (22/5 H. Dąbrowski Street),
- The Church of Jesus Christ of Latter-day Saints – Congregation of The Church of Jesus Christ of Latter-day Saints in Katowice (1 Warszawska Street),
- Church of Free Christians – Congregation in Katowice (21 J. Zajączek Street).

== Sports and recreation ==
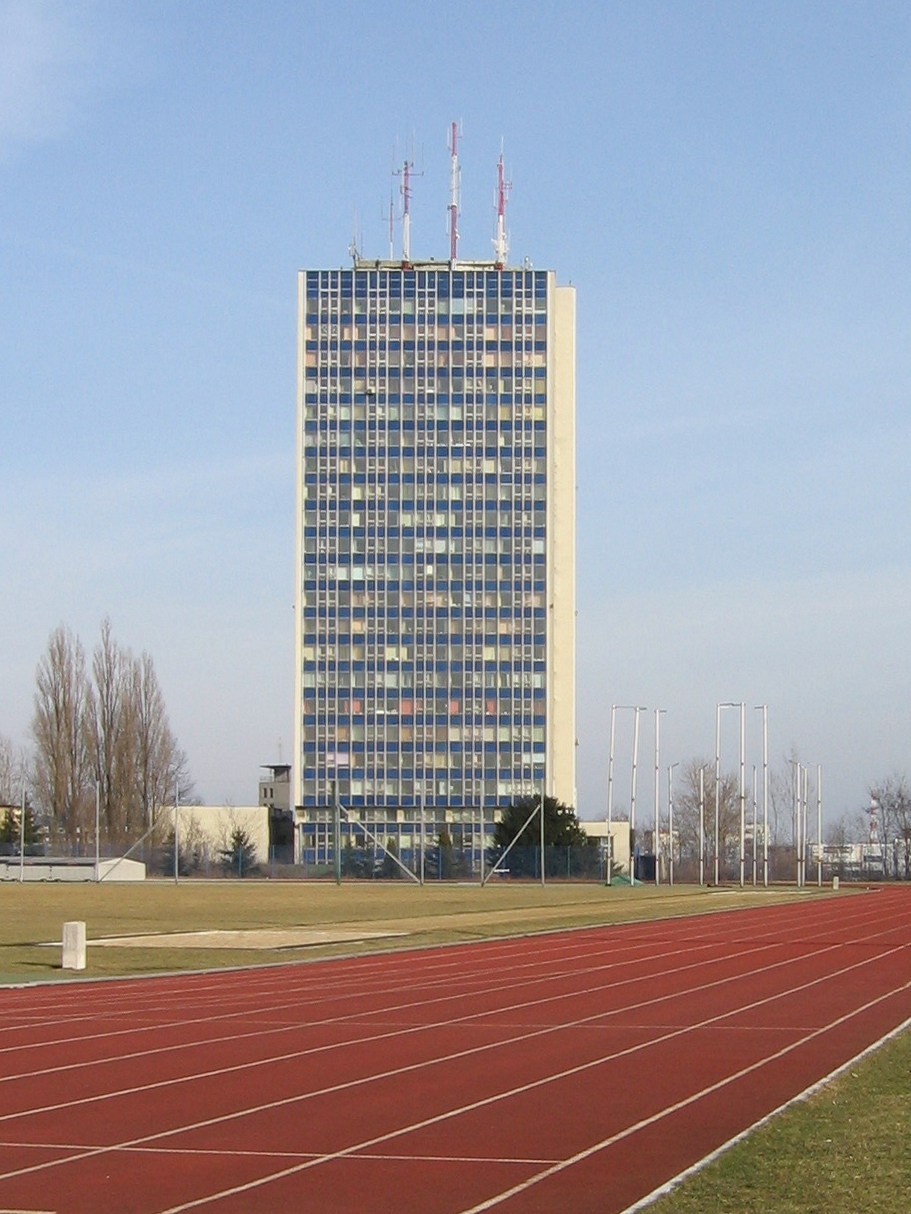
Fragment of AWF Katowice Stadium; in the background the Voivodeship Office Building

The development of organized sports and recreational structures in Śródmieście dates back to the second half of the 19th century. In 1860, an initiative to revive the gymnastics movement was started in Katowice, and by the outbreak of World War I, related associations had been established. Football began to develop in the area of present-day Śródmieście at the beginning of the 20th century. The first football structure was the Fußballclub Frischauf, established at the Parish of Saints Peter and Paul, and its successors were the clubs Preußen, Diana, and Germania. The first swimming club in Katowice was Erster Kattowitzer Schwimmverein, established in 1912, and the first tennis club was Kattowitzer Tennis Vereinigung.

In 1896, the Katowice branch of the Sokół Gymnastic Society was established, which also marked the beginning of Polish tourism in the area. At the end of World War I, on the initiative of Ernest Miller, the Piast Gymnastics and Sports Society was established, and in 1920, the Pogoń Katowice football club was founded. Between 1922 and 1939, a total of 96 sports organizations operated in Katowice. During World War II, the existing model of physical culture was abolished and replaced by one developed in Berlin in 1937. At that time, the 1. FC Kattowitz club was reactivated.

After World War II, the reconstruction of sports life in Katowice began, first in the form of state structures, and then social organizations. Ideological considerations had a major impact on the structure of sports in Śródmieście. Between 1954 and 1964, a total of 35 reactivated clubs were involved in high-level sports throughout Katowice, including those located in Śródmieście at the time: Silesian Automobile Club, Gwardia Katowice, Iskra Katowice, and Katowice Skating Club. Attempts were also made to reactivate clubs such as Pogoń Katowice, Silesian Skating Society, and Boxing Sports Club. In the 1960s, the number of clubs was reduced, partly due to the formation of the GKS Katowice structures, and in the 1970s, academic and school sports were reorganized.

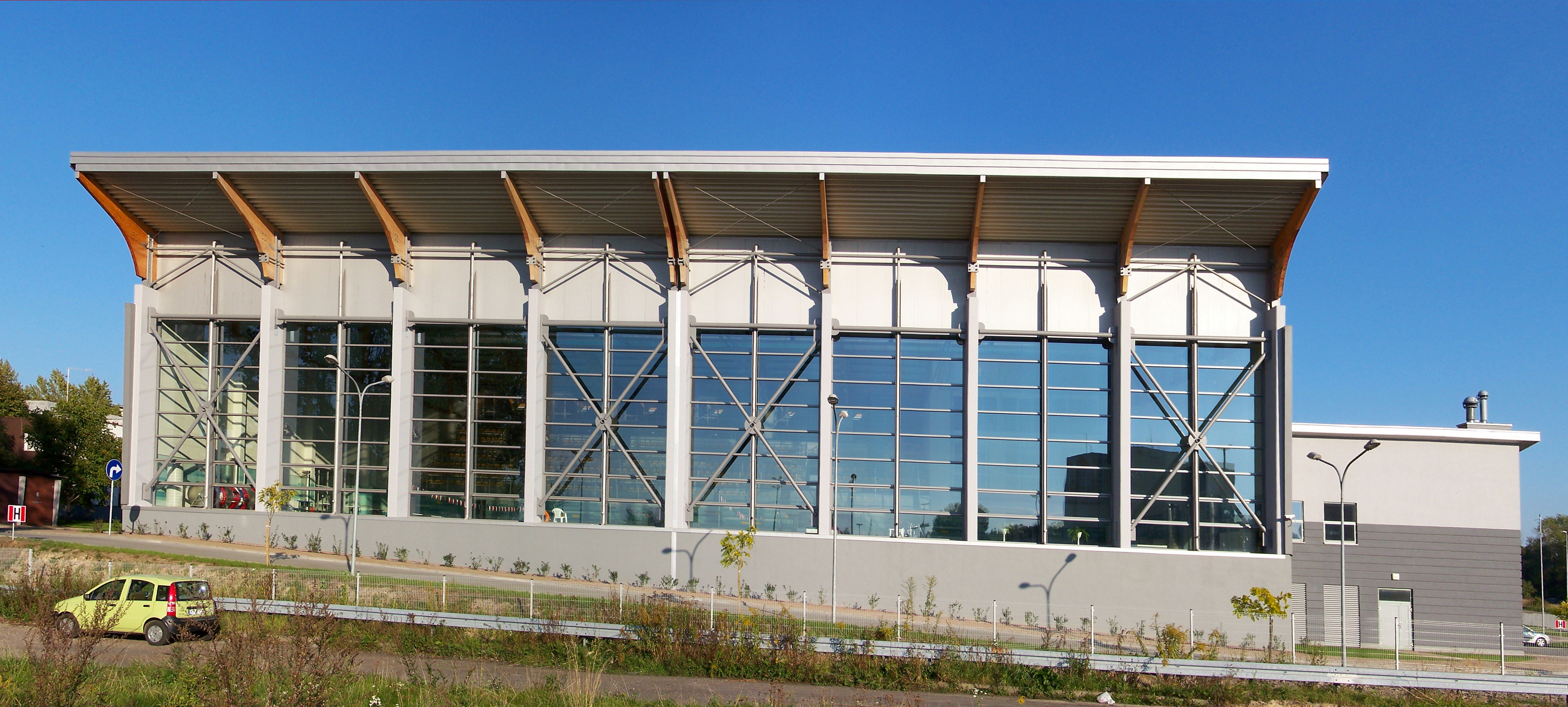
Sports hall of the Academy of Physical Education at Mikołowska Street

With the development of sports movements during the Polish People's Republic, new sports facilities were also built in Katowice. One of them was Torkat, reopened in Śródmieście in 1949 – the 13th artificially cooled ice rink in Europe. Torkat had originally been in operation since 7 December 1930. It had a cooled ice surface, stands, and a club-technical building. A fire in August 1973 led to the almost complete collapse of the building, which was not rebuilt. The Scientific Information Centre and Academic Library is now located in its place.

The political transformation that began in the 1990s also had an impact on sport. After the collapse of industrial patronage, the Jerzy Kukuczka Academy of Physical Education, located in Śródmieście, and the associated Academic Sports Union became increasingly important in the development of competitive sports, which led, among other things, to the revival of the Katowice winter sports center. In 2007, there were a total of 32 sports clubs operating in Śródmieście.

The AWF Katowice Stadium is located at 84 T. Kościuszko Street in Śródmieście. It was built in 1925 on the initiative of Baltazar Szaflik, and the first owner was the Pogoń Katowice sports club, after which it changed hosts several times. Among other events, football matches against Yugoslavia in 1935 and Latvia in 1937 were played there. In 2008, it underwent a thorough modernization. Currently, it is an athletics stadium with one grandstand on an embankment and is designed for 1,400 spectators.

== Public safety ==
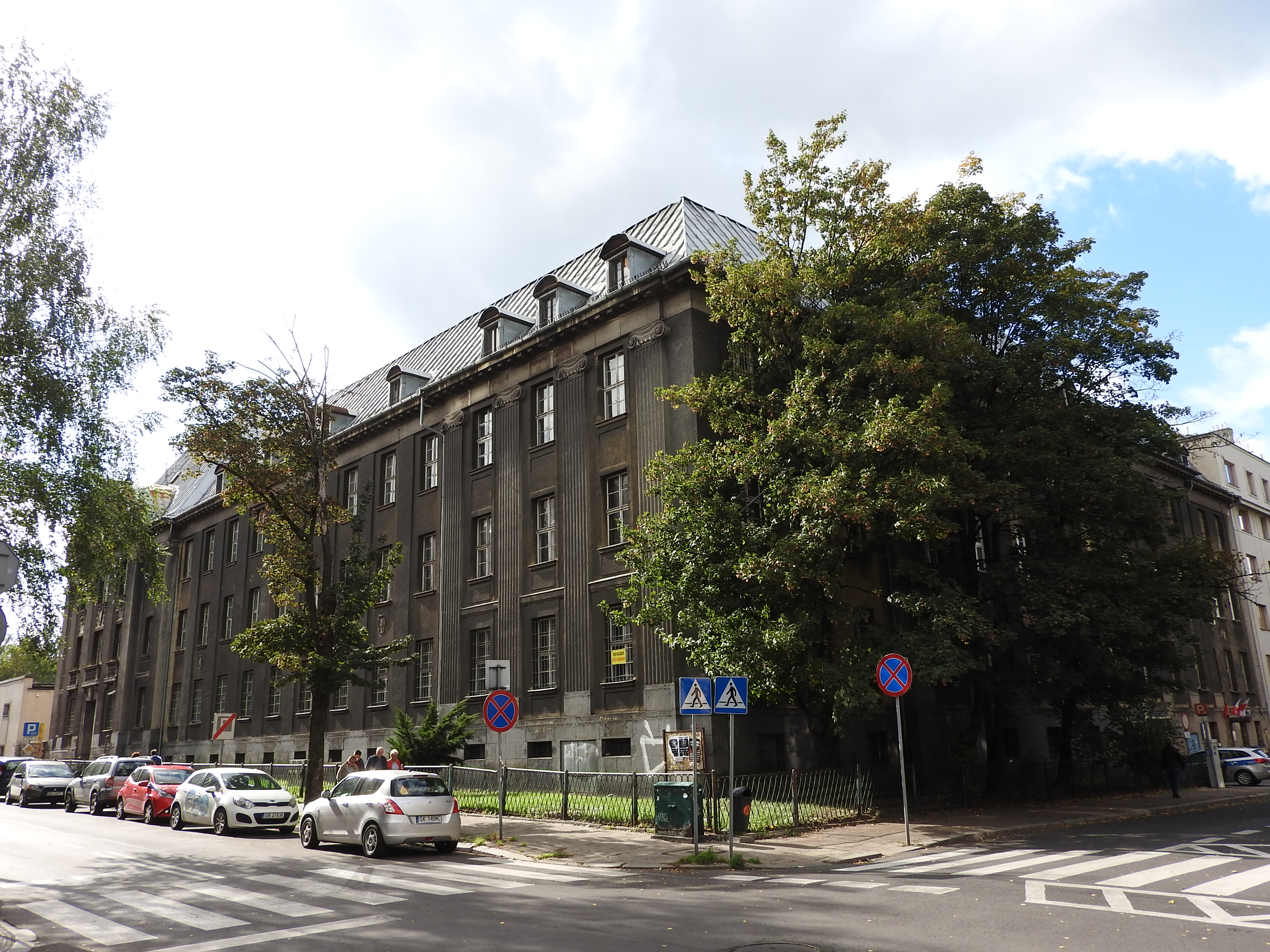
Police Station I of the Municipal Police Headquarters, located at 28 Żwirki i Wigury Street

In terms of crime rates, Śródmieście is one of the least safe districts in Katowice. In 2007, the crime rate for Śródmieście was the highest among all districts of Katowice, amounting to 6.51 incidents per 100 residents of the district. At the same time, it was more than twice as high as the average for Katowice as a whole. Between 2004 and 2007, it decreased from 9.62 crimes per 100 residents in 2004. During this period, the most dangerous places were the area around the Katowice railway station and 3 Maja, Mikołowska, Warszawska, and P. Skarga streets. In 2007, there were 63 traffic accidents in Śródmieście. Most of them were recorded in the area of Chorzowska, T. Kościuszko, and Mikołowska streets, and W. Roździeński and W. Korfanty avenues. In 2013, there were 2,488 crimes in Śródmieście, equivalent to 82 crimes per 1,000 residents. Śródmieście is home to the headquarters of the Voivodeship Police Headquarters at 19 J. Lompa Street, the Municipal Police Headquarters, and a branch of the Internal Security Agency. The municipal headquarters includes, among others, Police Station I, located in Śródmieście at 28 Żwirki i Wigury Street.

The headquarters of the Voivodeship Fire Service Headquarters is located at 36 W. Stwosz Street in Śródmieście. The area of the district is covered by the Municipal Fire Service Headquarters, located at 11 Wojewódzka Street, and the same address is also home to Rescue and Firefighting Unit No. 1. The Professional Fire Service was established in 1903, and its headquarters were located at what is now 11 Wojewódzka Street.

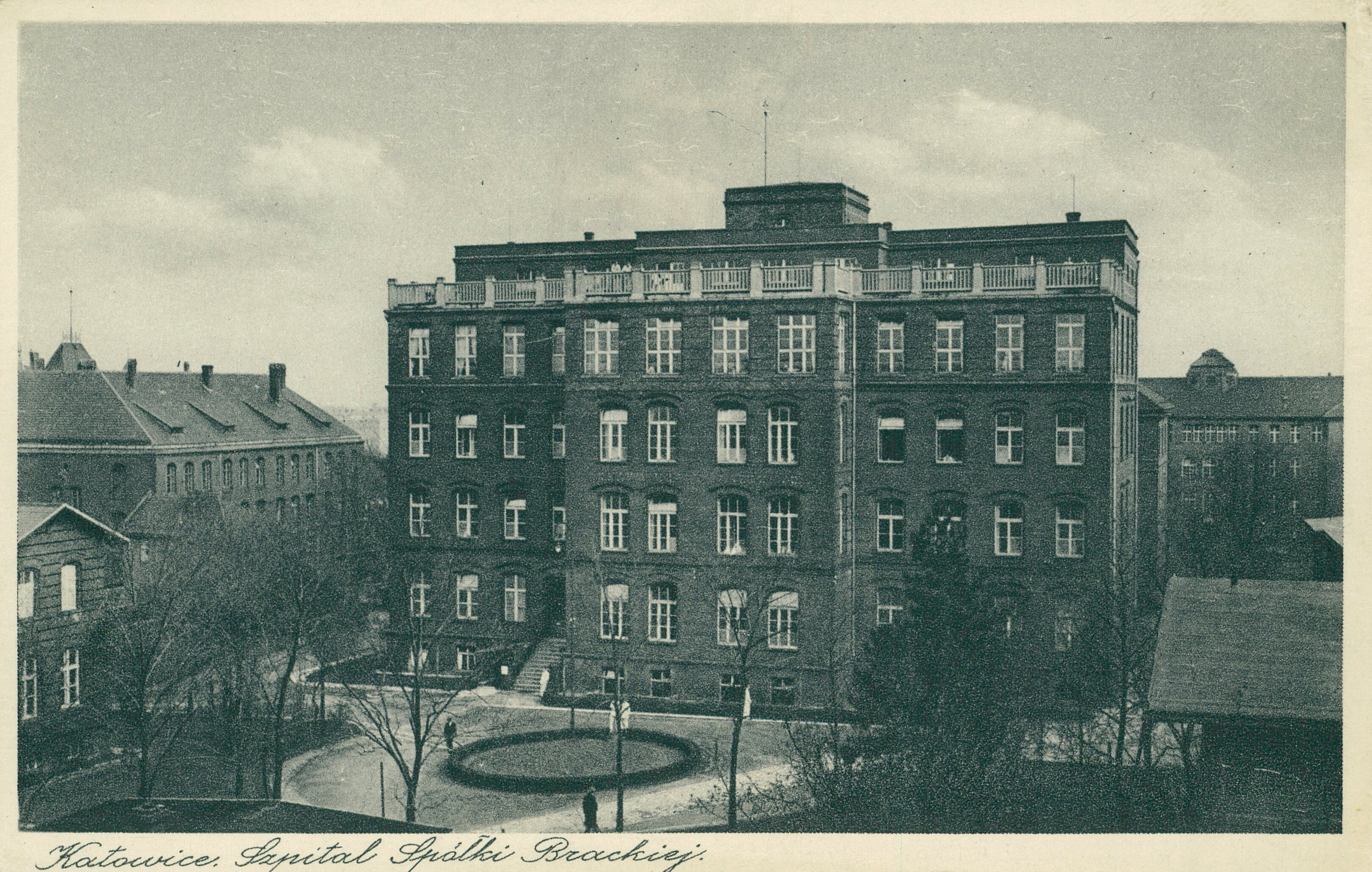
Former Hospital of the Fraternal Association before 1939; currently the A. Mielęcki Independent Public Clinical Hospital (20–24 Francuska Street)

Due to frequent epidemics of infectious diseases in Katowice in the mid-19th century, a small hospital with 14 beds was opened in 1867 on what is now Plebiscytowa Street, and Dr. Richard Holtze cared for the sick. The first large hospital in Katowice, owned by the Fraternal Association from Tarnowskie Góry, was opened on Francuska Street on 1 June 1895. At that time, it was the largest hospital in the area, with 450 beds. In the same year, a public bathhouse was built on what is now A. Mickiewicz Street. In 1900, a hospital run by the Sisters of St. Elizabeth was established on today's Warszawska Street, and in 1904, a municipal hospital was opened on what is now Raciborska Street. In the 1920s, a children's hospital with 115 beds was opened on the same street, which was enlarged a few years later.

In March 2022, the following hospitals were located in Śródmieście:

- American Heart of Poland – St. Elizabeth Hospital (52 Warszawska Street),
- Katowice Oncology Center (26 Raciborska Street),
- Andrzej Mielęcki Independent Public Clinical Hospital of the Medical University of Silesia (20-24 Francuska Street),
- Silesian Urological Hospital (9 Strzelecka Street).

== Bibliography ==
- Barciak, Antoni; Chojecka, Ewa; Fertacz, Sylwester, eds. (2012). Katowice. Środowisko, dzieje, kultura, język i społeczeństwo [Katowice. Environment, History, Culture, Language and Society] (in Polish). Vol. 1–2. Katowice: Museum of the History of Katowice. ISBN 978-83-87727-24-6.
- Bartoszek, A.; Czekaj, K.; Trawkowska, D., eds. (2012). Diagnoza problemów społecznych i monitoring polityki społecznej dla aktywizacji zasobów ludzkich w Katowicach [Diagnosis of Social Problems and Monitoring of Social Policy for the Activation of Human Resources in Katowice] (in Polish). Katowice: University of Silesia. ISBN 978-83-61061-97-7.
- Bulsa, Michał (2018). Ulice i place Katowic [Streets and Squares of Katowice] (in Polish) (3rd ed.). Katowice: Prasa i Książka. ISBN 978-83-63780-28-9.
- Bulsa, M.; Szmatloch, B. (2019). Katowice, których nie ma [Katowice That No Longer Exists] (in Polish). Łódź: Księży Młyn. ISBN 978-83-7729-502-1.
- Drobek, Daria; Michalska, Ewa; Radecki, Ryszard; Perdyła, Magdalena (January 2014). Opracowanie ekofizjograficzne podstawowe z elementami opracowania ekofizjograficznego problemowego (problematyka ochrony dolin rzecznych oraz ograniczeń dla zagospodarowania terenu wynikających z wpływu działalności górniczej) dla potrzeb opracowania projektów miejscowych planów zagospodarowania przestrzennego obszarów położonych w mieście Katowice [Basic Ecophysiographic Study with Elements of a Problem-Oriented Ecophysiographic Study (Issues of River Valley Protection and Constraints on Land Development Resulting from the Impact of Mining Activity) for the Purposes of Preparing Draft Local Spatial Development Plans for Areas Located within the City of Katowice] (in Polish). Katowice: Werona.
- Drobniak, A.; Polko, A.; Plac, K., eds. (2014). Diagnoza sytuacji społeczno-ekonomicznej Miasta Katowice wraz z wyznaczeniem obszarów rewitalizacji i analizą strategiczną [Diagnosis of the Socio-Economic Situation of the City of Katowice, Including the Designation of Revitalization Areas and Strategic Analysis] (PDF) (in Polish). Katowice: City of Katowice. ISBN 978-83-61061-97-7.
- "Raport o stanie miasta Katowice" [Report on the State of the City of Katowice] (PDF). katowice.eu (in Polish). 2005.
- Rzewiczok, Urszula (2006). Zarys dziejów Katowic 1299-1990 [Outline of the History of Katowice 1299–1990] (in Polish). Katowice: Museum of the History of Katowice. ISBN 83-87727-42-3.
- Szaraniec, Lech (1984). Architektura Katowic [Architecture of Katowice] (in Polish). Katowice: Katowice City Hall.
- Szaraniec, Lech (1996). Osady i osiedla Katowic [Settlements and Housing Estates of Katowice] (in Polish). Katowice: Artur. ISBN 83-905115-0-9.
- Tkocz, Maria (1995). Katowice jako ośrodek regionalny w latach 1865–1995 [Katowice as a Regional Center in the Years 1865–1995] (in Polish). Katowice: Śląsk. ISBN 83-85831-78-9.
- Zemła, Marek, ed. (25 April 2012). Studium uwarunkowań i kierunków zagospodarowania przestrzennego miasta Katowice – II edycja. Część 1. Uwarunkowania zagospodarowania przestrzennego [Study of the Conditions and Directions of Spatial Development of the City of Katowice – Second Edition. Part One. Conditions of Spatial Development] (PDF) (in Polish). Katowice: Biuro Rozwoju Regionu.
