= Młyńska Street =

Street in Katowice, Poland

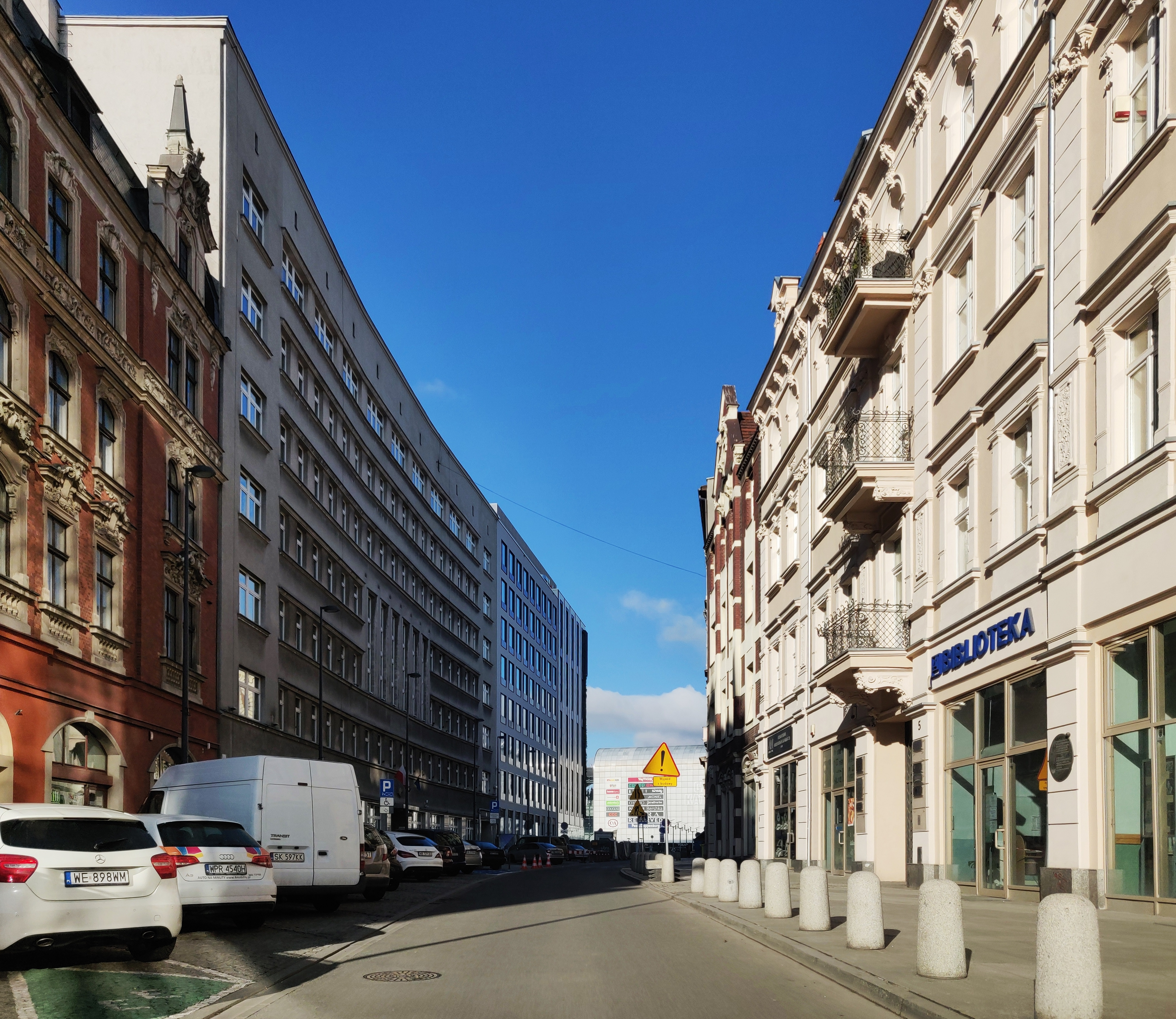
- Młyńska Street in 2021
- Interactive map of Młyńska Street
- Former name: Mühlstraße (until 1922, 1939–1945)
- Part of: Śródmieście
- Length: 220 m (720 ft)
- Location: Katowice, Poland
- Coordinates: 50°15′31.5″N 19°01′13.1″E

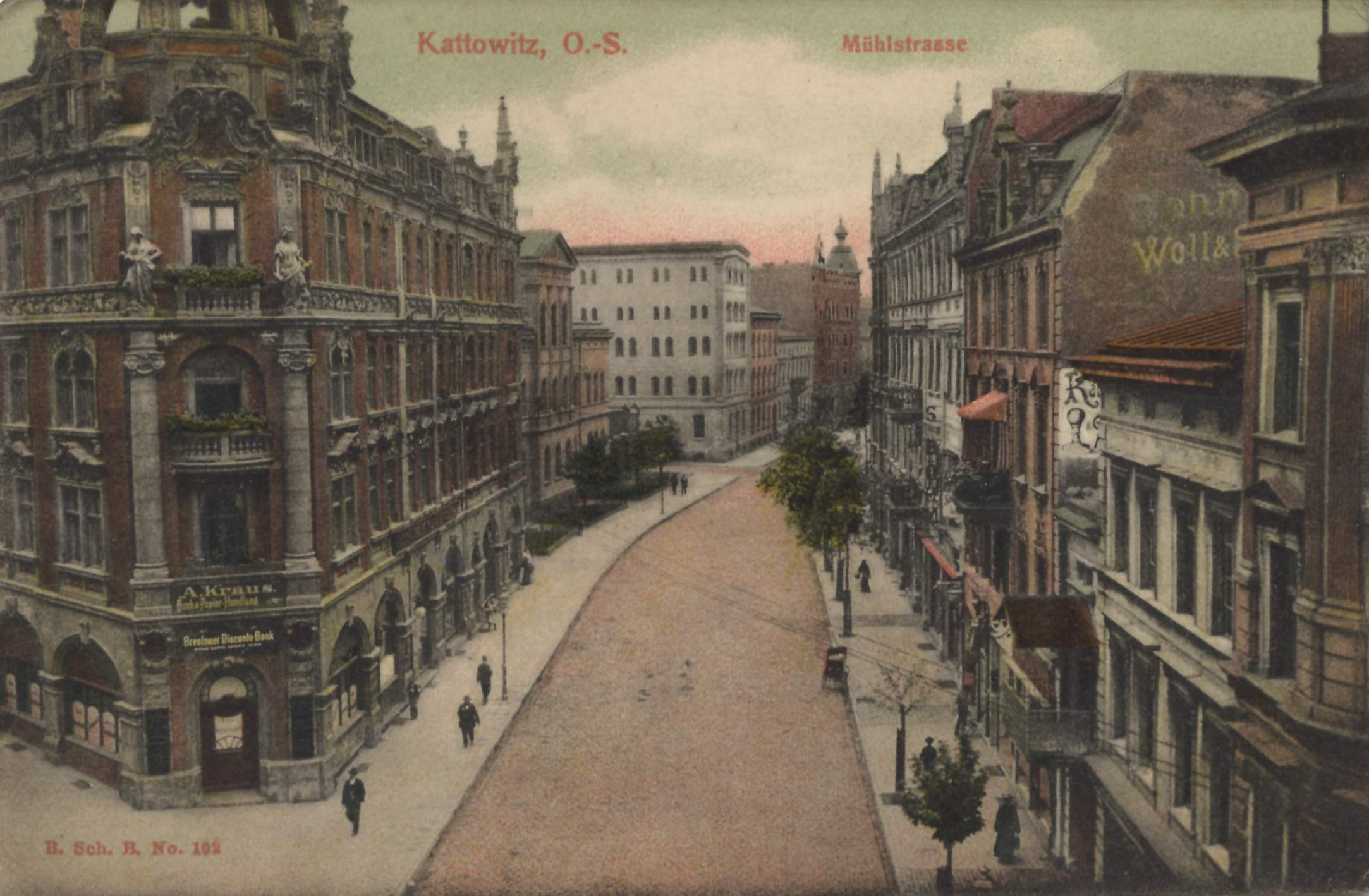
Mühlstraße on a postcard from the early 20th century; in the background (left), mill buildings

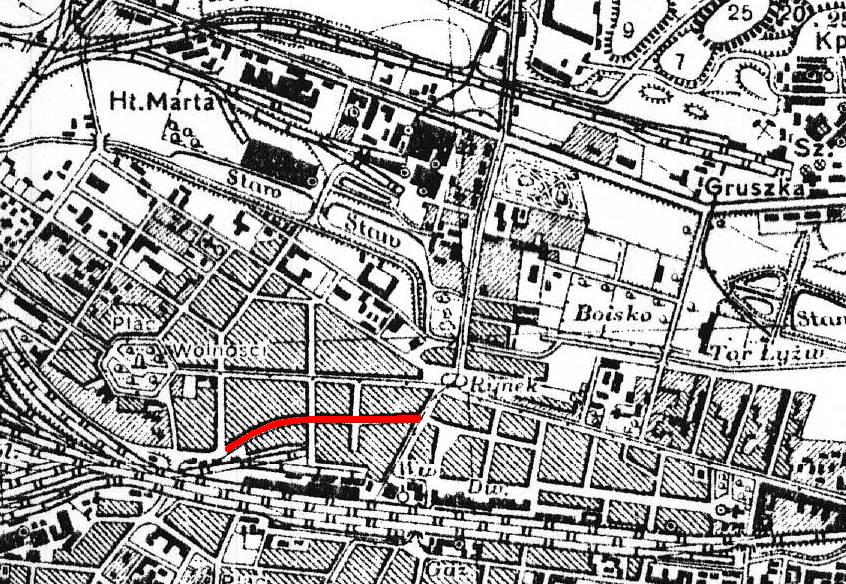
Młyńska Street on a 1933 map (marked with a red line)

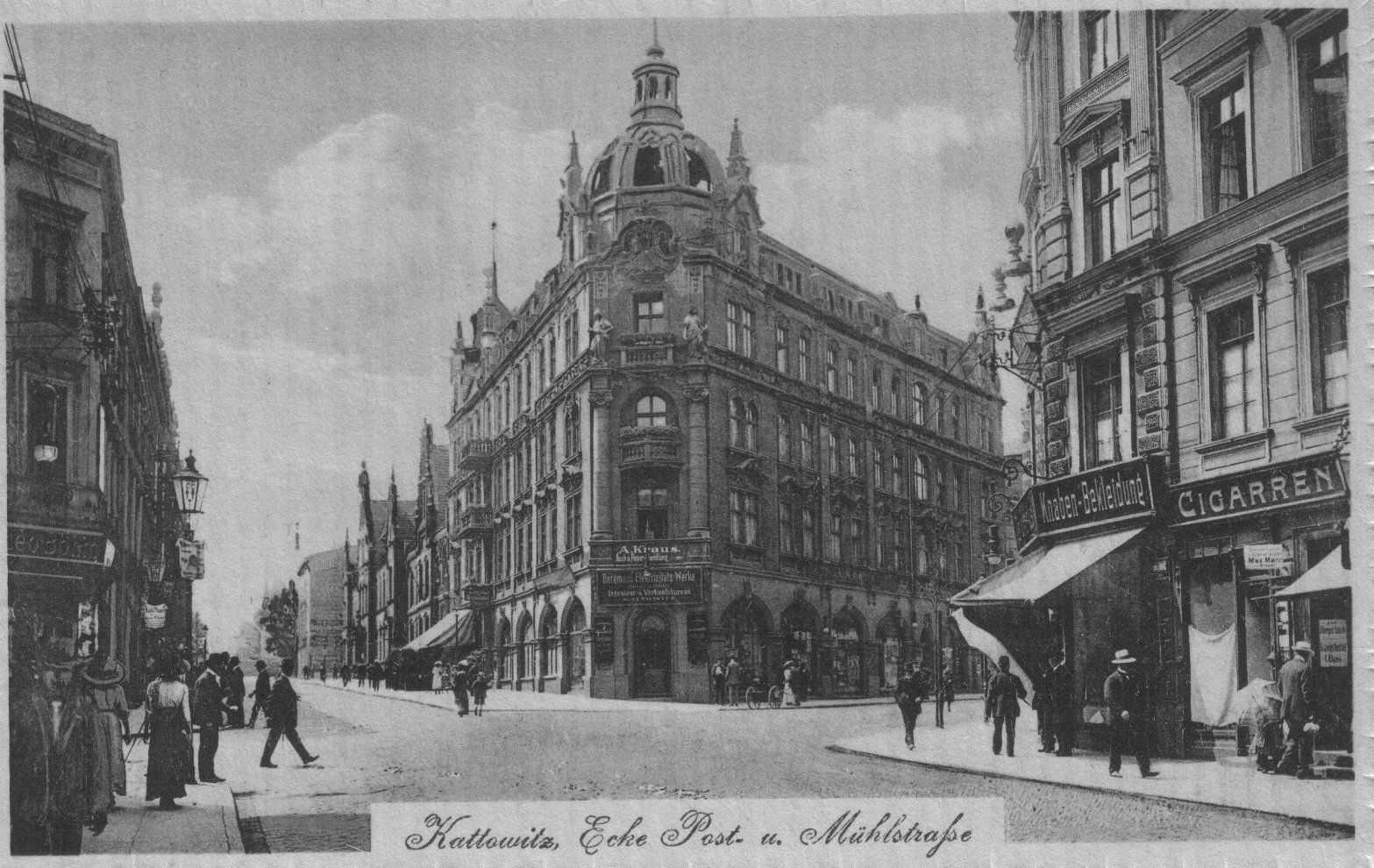
Tenement at Market Square (corner of 2 Młyńska Street and 5 Pocztowa Street)

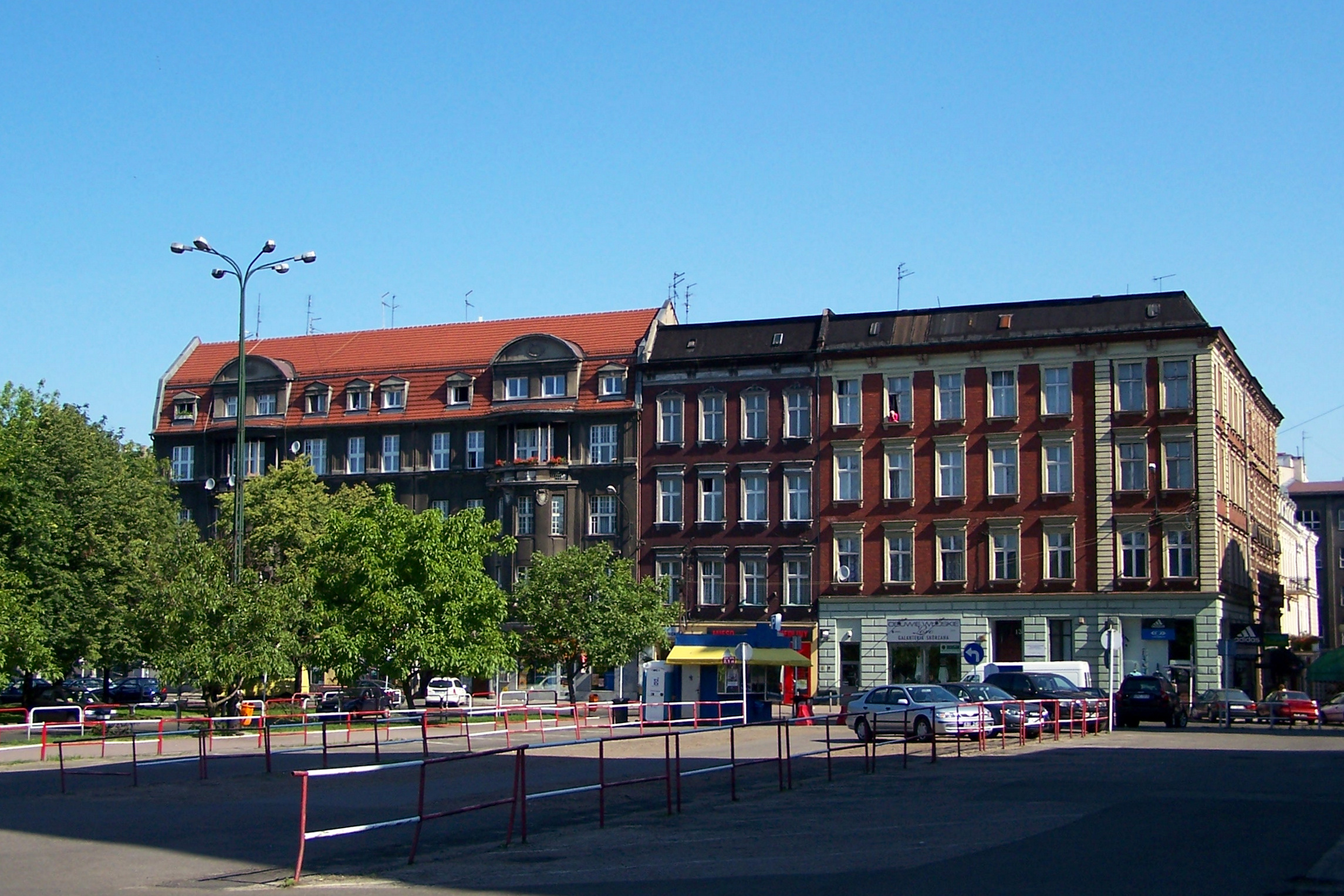
Historic buildings on Młyńska Street

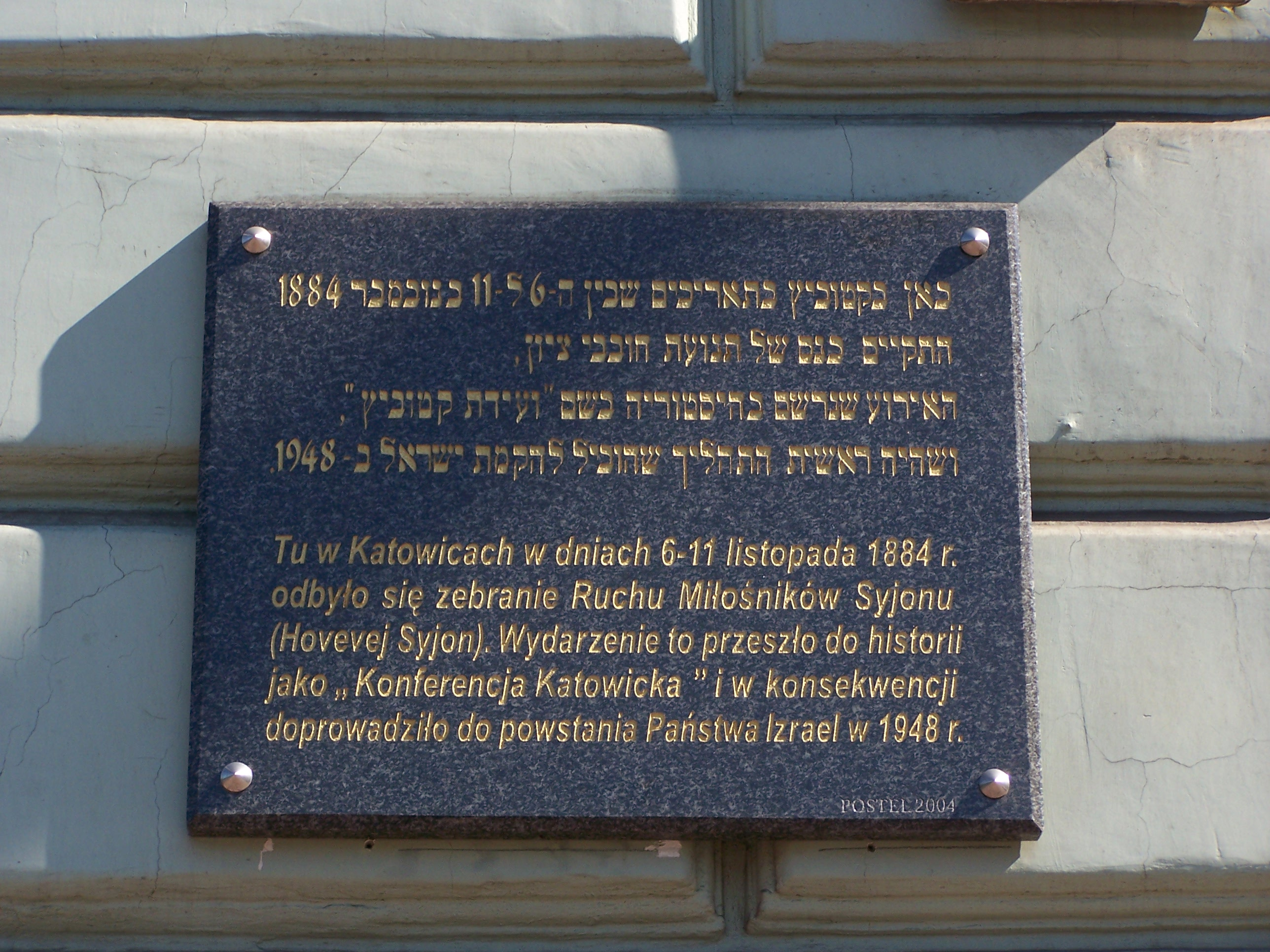
Plaque on the facade of the building at 13 Młyńska Street, commemorating the Katowice Conference

Młyńska Street in Katowice (until 1922, and from 1939 to 1945, Mühlstraße) is one of the oldest streets in the Śródmieście district of Katowice. It begins at Market Square, intersects with Wawelska Street, and ends at the junction with Dworcowa Street near Wilhelm Szewczyk Square and the Katowice railway station.

The street's name derives from 1860, when Louis Fiedler, Max Glaser, and Julius Feige constructed and operated steam mills there. Grain warehouses were also built along the street.

== History ==
In the second half of the 16th century, a local communication hub existed near a former forge pond at the corner of present-day Market Square and St. John Street. Roads extended in four directions: southwest to Mikołów (now Młyńska Street and Mikołowska Street), south to Brynów (now St. John Street, Jan Kochanowski Street, and Wit Stwosz Street), east to Szopienice and Mysłowice (Warszawska Street), and north to the northern part of Bogucice's center (near the church, along Katowicka Street) and further to Dąbrówka Mała. The earliest buildings on present-day Młyńska Street were five workers' houses, built shortly after 1825 (between today's Stawowa and Słowacki streets, now occupied by a shopping mall). From 1846, when the Upper Silesian Railway from Wrocław to Mysłowice via Katowice was established, the street ended at the railway tracks. The last workers' house was converted into a station building with a post office. In 1859, after the "old" railway station was built at Dworcowa Street, this building temporarily housed a Protestant school until 1860.

A Catholic public school was built in the 1880s on Młyńska Street. It is now the site of the City Hall building. On 9 October 1871, this four-class elementary school was ceremonially opened, and from January 1874, it operated in a new building on present-day 3 Maja Street. In 1856, pharmacist Tripitz established Katowice's first pharmacy in a small house on Friedrichstraße (now Warszawska Street), later relocated to Mühlstraße (now Młyńska Street). From 6 to 11 November 1884, the Katowice Conference of the Jewish Lovers of Zion movement, aimed at establishing an independent Israel, was held in a house at the corner of Młyńska and Stawowa street.

In 1930, the City Hall building was erected with a curved facade. Designed by Lucjan Sikorski, Tadeusz Eugeniusz Łobos, and Leon Dietz d'Arma in 1929, the building's silhouette follows the curve of Młyńska Street. It features eight stories and horizontal window bands, reflecting the Neues Bauen architectural style.

During the interwar period, several offices were located on Młyńska Street: the Citizenship Office (2 Młyńska Street), the Building and Surveying Office (4 Młyńska Street), the Tax Office (4 Młyńska Street), the Municipal Police (4 Młyńska Street), the Tax Collection Office and Main Municipal Treasury (4 Młyńska Street), and the Social Welfare Office (4 Młyńska Street).

Until 1939, the street housed various businesses and organizations: Wiktor Lachman's chemical store (19 Młyńska Street), the Silesian Fruit Agency (20 Młyńska Street), A. Kochbaum and Co.'s fruit shop (22 Młyńska Street), J. Flejszer and E. Górski's bookstore and music shop (established in 1933 at 4 Młyńska Street), the editorial office of the newspaper Der Aufbruch (22 Młyńska Street), the German Economic Association (23 Młyńska Street), Teofil Śmieja's restaurant (14 Młyńska Street). The Silesian Uprisings Veterans' Association was located at 47 Młyńska Street. At the same address, from 1932, the editorial office of the magazine Młodzież Powstańcza and the Main Board of the Youth of the Uprisings operated, while a railway directorate preschool was at 49 Młyńska Street.

In 1942, the Stadttisches Friedhofsamt, an office managing denominational cemeteries under local authority, was established at 4 Młyńska Street.

In 1963, the Silesian Press House was opened at 1 Młyńska Street. In the 1970s, a block of buildings in the area of 3 Maja Street, Młyńska Street, and Stawowa Street, consisting of eclectic tenements, was demolished to build the new main railway station building. Młyńska Street was shortened, with a section now part of Sądowa Street and Juliusz Słowacki Street. The station's hall, designed by W. Zalewski, utilized concrete "chalice" forms to support the ceiling. Opened in 1972, it exemplified Brutalism, a form of late modernism.

In 2004, marking the 120th anniversary of the Katowice Conference, a commemorative plaque was unveiled on the facade of a building on Młyńska Street. In March 2010, the Katowice synagogue was relocated from its old building at 13 Młyńska Street to the Chaskel Besser Synagogue at 16 3 Maja Street. On 16 August 2010, access from Młyńska Street to Wilhelm Szewczyk Square was closed due to the start of railway station reconstruction. The next phase of street modernization began on 24 January 2011, when Wilhelm Szewczyk Square was completely closed to traffic.

== Description ==
=== Historic buildings ===
- Bourgeois tenement (2 Młyńska Street, 5 Pocztowa Street), built in 1898 on a triangular plan, likely designed by Louis Dame, in the Baroque Revival style (previously a Renaissance Revival tenement and corner hotel). Its former address was 7 Market Square. The building has a three-wing structure with subtle avant-corps decoration. The truncated corner features an entrance to an internal courtyard. The double-pitched roof has dormers. The 13-axis facade is richly decorated with red brick cladding, with architectural details and the corner elaborately plastered. The northern facade has three pseudo-avant-corps, and the eastern has two two-axis pseudo-avant-corps (first and last axes). Balconies with stone balustrades are placed in the central axis. The corner, between rusticated Tuscan columns, features a trapezoidal cornice and a semicircular niche with balconies (with balustrades). Two sculpted female figures adorn the cornice. Window frames are crowned with cartouches in floral surrounds and sculpted female heads. The building retains its original main staircase (in the eastern wing), steel double-flight stairs with a wooden balustrade, and ceramic flooring.
- Bourgeois tenement (5 Młyńska Street), built in the second half of the 19th century, known as the "House with Lions". The facade features lion heads as stucco decoration. From 1894, it belonged to notary and lawyer Karl Sittka. During the interwar period, it housed the gynecologist couple Kazimierz and Henryka Wędlikowski (Kazimierz ran a clinic at 6 Wit Stwosz Street), and engineer Jerzy Pobóg-Krasnodębski operated the Central Carbide Office. On 28 June 1906, Maria Goeppert Mayer, later a Nobel Prize laureate in physics, was born here and lived until 1909. A commemorative plaque was placed on the facade in the 1990s.
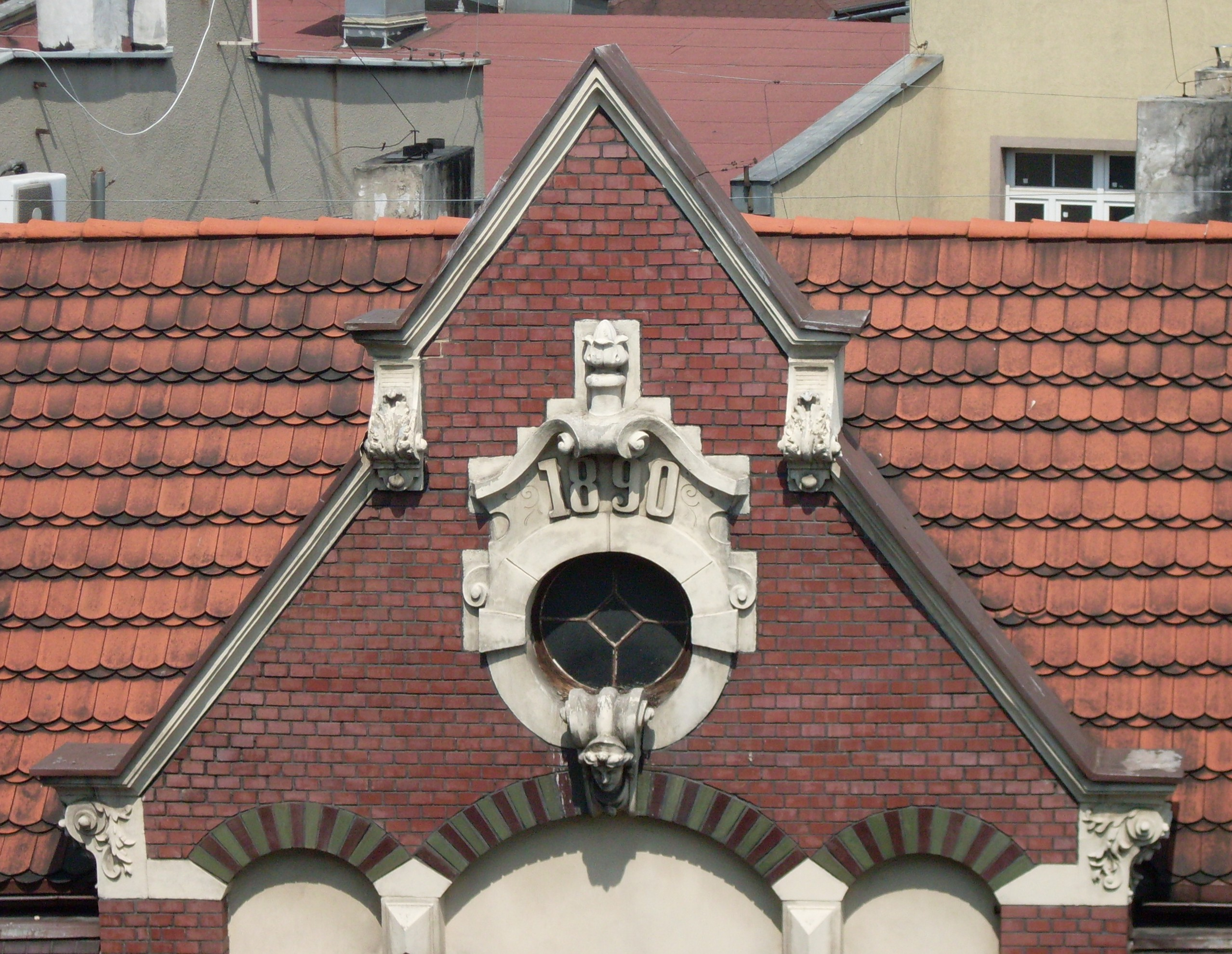
- Detail on the facade of the tenement at 7 Młyńska Street
  Bourgeois tenement (7 Młyńska Street), built in 1890 by Ludwig Schneider in the eclectic style, originally richly decorated. The facade is clad in brown and green brick with plastered bands and plaques. The top features a pseudo-avant-corps with a three-arched niche (retaining the date and a window with a cartouche frame). Decorative brackets resembling female heads and a dentil cornice crown the facade. The tenement preserves double-flight stairs with a wooden balustrade.
- Residential-commercial tenement (9 Młyńska Street), likely built between 1895 and 1899 on a square plan, extended in 1930, in the historicist style. During the interwar period, it housed the Kadas School Supply. The four-axis front facade is clad in red brick and crowned with a cornice. Windows have plastered, eared frames (second and third floors have arched windows, fourth has rectangular). The interior retains double-flight stairs with a secondary metal balustrade.

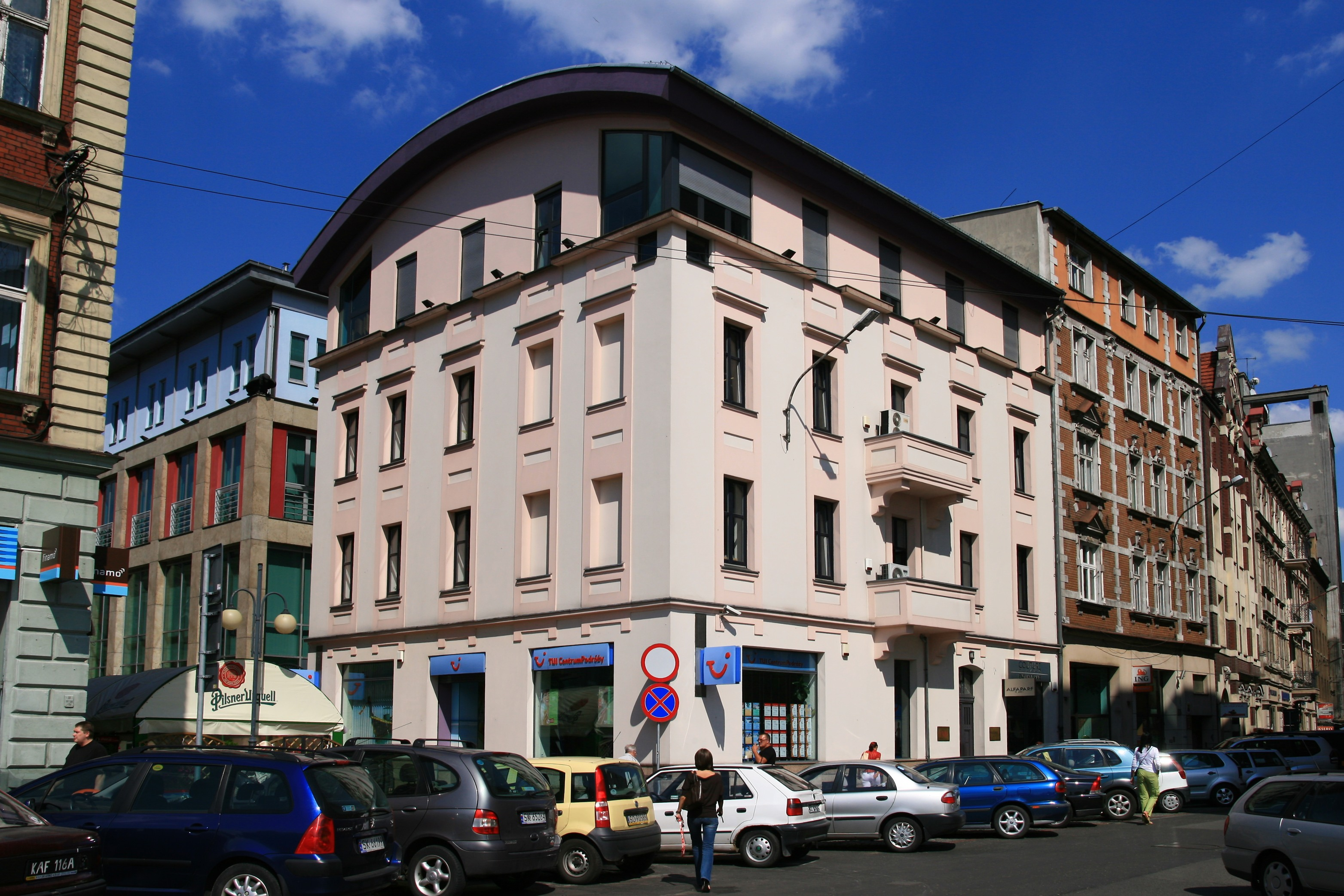
Historic tenement at 11 Młyńska Street (corner with Wawelska Street)

- Residential-commercial tenement (11 Młyńska Street), built in 1859 at the corner of Mühlstraße and Rüppelstraße on a rectangular plan, originally with three stories and a slightly sloped hipped roof. The facade is plastered, with an ornate cornice at the ground floor level. Balconies with solid masonry balustrades, supported by consoles, are placed on the axis. The single-axis side facade features window-shaped blind arcades. The interior retains double-flight stairs. A fourth story was later added, covered with a barrel-vaulted roof.
- Bourgeois tenement (13 Młyńska Street, corner with Wawelska Street), built in 1890 by Max Schalscha on a rectangular plan in the eclectic style with Renaissance Revival elements. During the interwar period, it housed the People's Bank and the City Hall printing house. The building features subtle pseudo-avant-corps and a rusticated ground floor. Higher floors are clad in red brick with plastered architectural details. The southern facade has seven axes, the eastern six. The corner is framed by an avant-corps with rusticated pilasters. Windows are rectangular (first-floor window sills rest on lion heads, others on consoles). The building is crowned by a cornice on brackets. It retains ceramic flooring, steel double-flight stairs with a wooden balustrade, stucco ceiling decoration, and rose windows with stucco ornamentation in some apartments.
- Residential-commercial tenement (15 Młyńska Street), built in the 1890s on a rectangular plan with two wings (side and rear), in the eclectic style with Renaissance Revival elements. The compact structure has a four-axis front facade, clad in red brick on upper floors, identical to that of 13 Młyńska Street. The interior retains steel double-flight stairs with wooden steps and a balustrade, ceramic tile flooring, and decorative cornices and rose windows in about 30% of the apartments' windows.
- Residential-commercial tenement (17–19 Młyńska Street), built in 1911 by Hugo Weissenberg in the modernist style with three wings (two side, one rear). It replaced a two-story tenement. The nine-axis plastered front facade features three-axis semicircular bay windows on the second and penultimate axes. An ornate portal crowns the entrance doors (on the second and seventh axes). Two colossal pilasters with cartouches adorn the bay window axes. Semicircular colonnaded balcony loggias are on the fourth floor. Facades above the bay windows have pediments with oval cartouches. The interior retains masonry stairs with wooden handrails, fragments of original stained glass, and stucco decorations on ceilings and walls.
- Residential-commercial tenement (21, 23 Młyńska Street, 7 Wilhelm Szewczyk Square), built in the 1860s. From 1912, it housed Anton Klemens' restaurant, rebuilt in 1913 as the Klemens Hotel. During the interwar period, it was home to a Nazi organization.

=== Institutions ===
The following institutions are located on Młyńska Street: the Municipal Guard (9 Młyńska Street), commercial and service companies, cafes, law firms, newspaper offices (Dziennik Zachodni and Echo Miasta Katowice), Górnośląska Oficyna Wydawnicza, a branch of the Katowice Municipal Housing Management Company, the general reading room and branch no. 35 of the Katowice Public Library, Katowice Post Office 1 (branch), Polskapresse (Silesian press division), the Polish Association of Pensioners, Retirees, and Disabled (Regional Board), the Association of Polish Journalists (branch), Katowice City Hall (4 Młyńska Street), housing communities, and the Confederation of Independent Poland – Patriotic Camp.

== See also ==
- History of Katowice
