= Warszawska Street, Katowice =

Street in Katowice, Poland

Warszawska Street
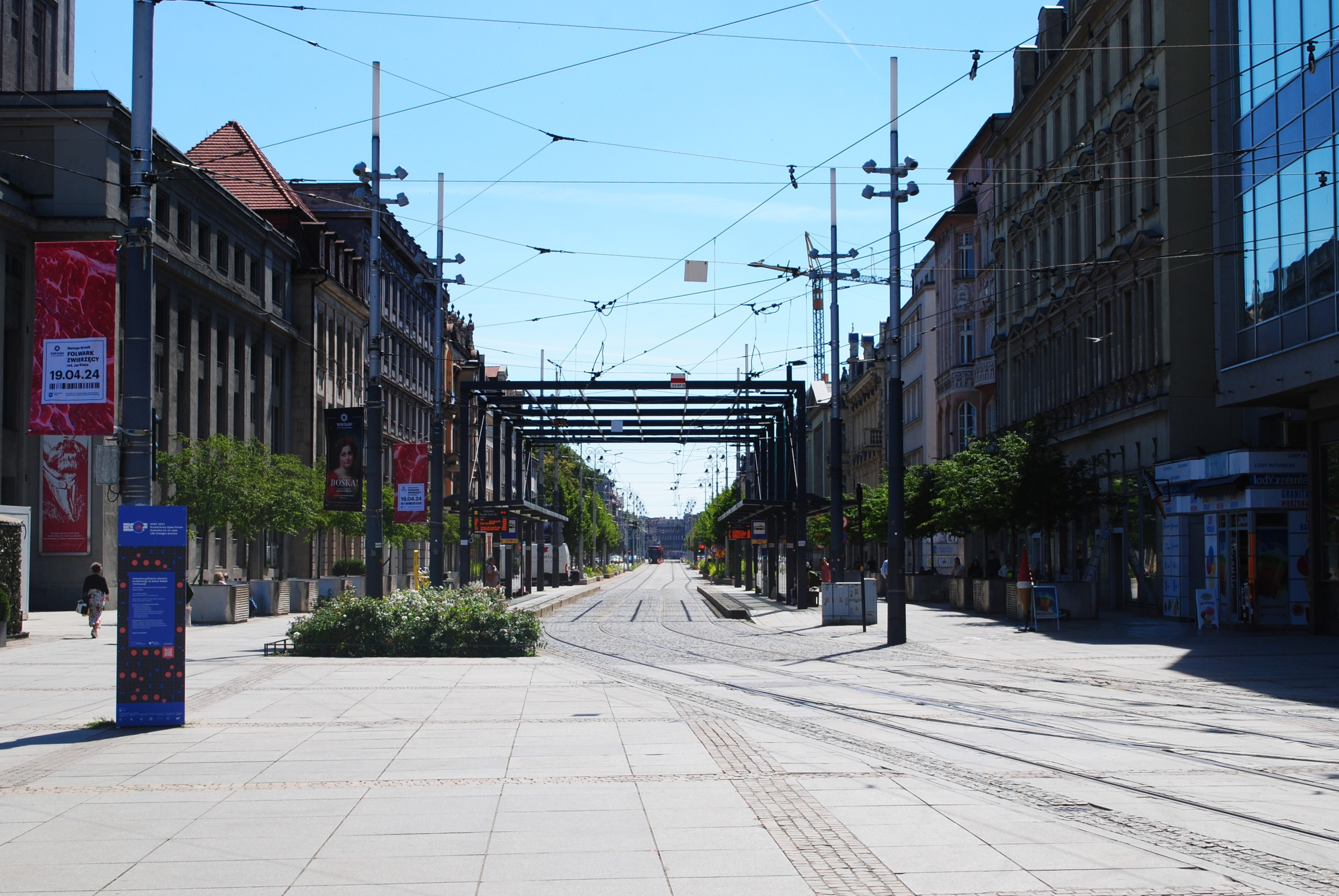
- Warszawska Street in 2024
- Interactive map of Warszawska Street
- Former name(s): Friedrichstraße; Marszałka Piłsudskiego
- Location: Katowice, Poland
- Coordinates: 50.2583°N 19.0290°E
- West end: Market Square
- East end: Mysłowice Road

Warszawska Street in Katowice (Warsaw Street) is a street in the centre of Katowice. The street was built in the 19th century. Until 1922 and during World War II the street was called Friedrichstraße, 1926–1939 Marszałka Piłsudskiego (Piłsudski Street).

== History ==
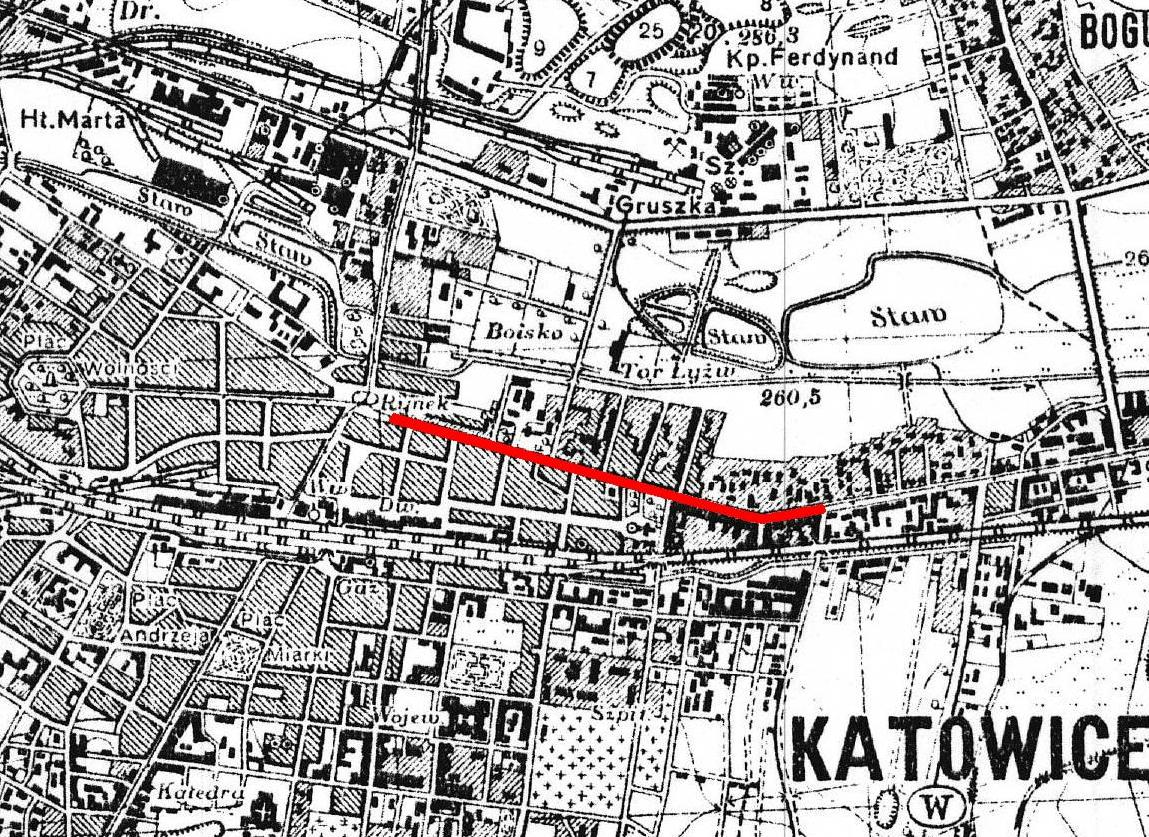
Warszawska Street, marked with a red line, on the map of the Military Geographical Institute from 1933

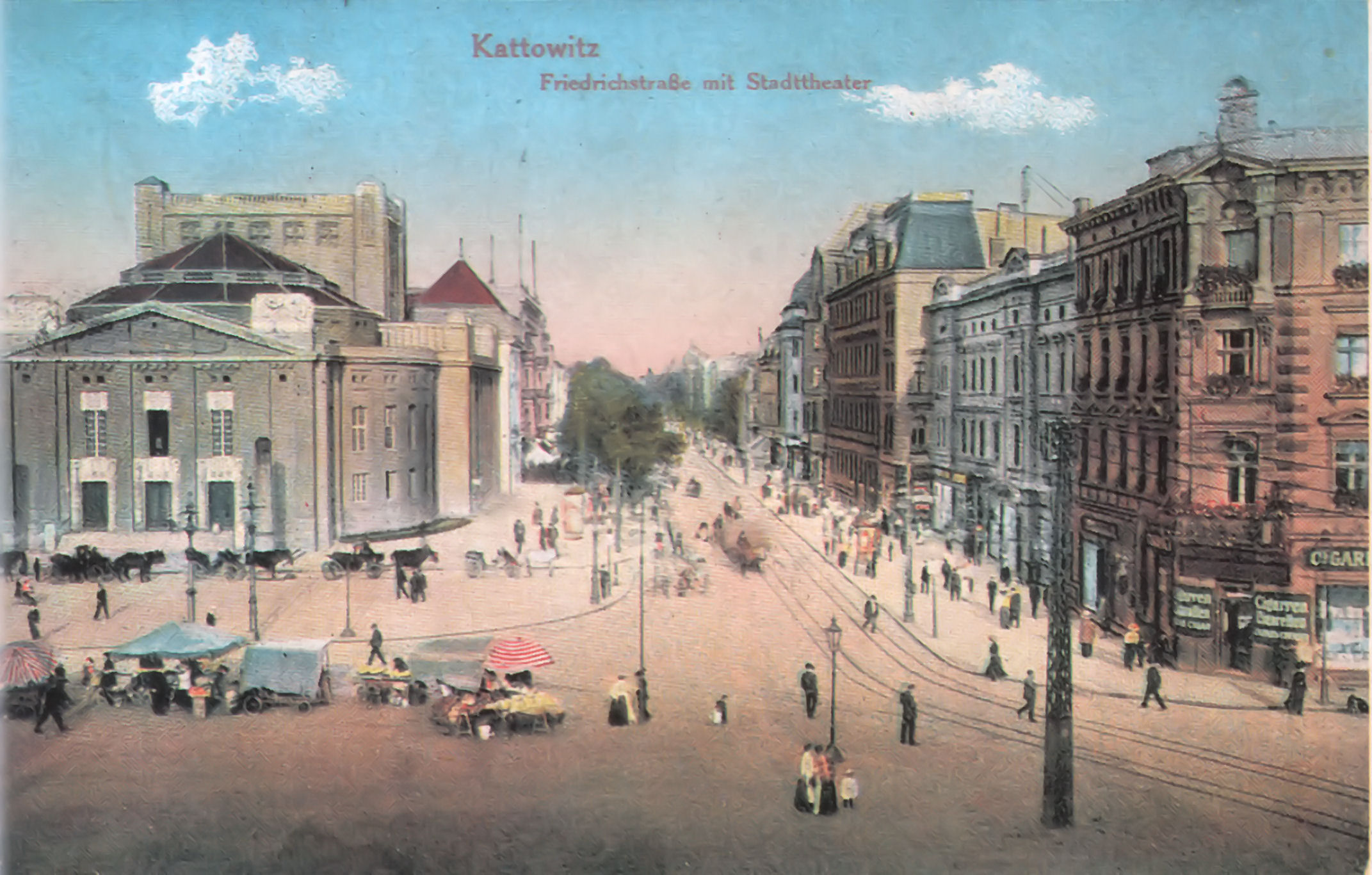
Beginning of Warszawska Street at the Market Square (postcard from the beginning of the 20th century)

Originally, the street leading to the Market Square (formerly Friedrichplatz) was called Chausseestraße/Chaussee von Myslovitz; in 1857 the name was changed to Friedrichstraße. It served as the main east–west axis (together with Grundmannstraße – now 3 Maja Street, and Bismarckstraße – now Gliwicka Street). In the mid-19th century, the Municipal Office was located there (Chausseestraße 2).

On a spatial map of the village of Katowice from 1823, the road already appears as an important route leading to Mysłowice.

In 1848, at the beginning of today’s Warszawska Street (then the address Rynek 12), on the site of the present “Zenit” Department Store, the first hotel in Katowice was opened. It was popularly known as the Hotel Welt, after one of its owners, Karl Welt. In 1850, the hotel’s ground-floor restaurant hall hosted a concert by Johann Strauss and his orchestra.

In 1856, in a small house on Friedrichstraße, pharmacist Tripitz founded Katowice’s first pharmacy (later moved to Mühlstraße – now Młyńska Street). On August 1, 1876, another pharmacy, Adlerapotheke (“Pharmacy Under the Eagle”), opened on the same street in the Spisz House (founded by pharmacist Liedke, later owned by City Councillor Herzberger).

According to Royal Prussian land measurements from 1881 (published in 1883), the intersection of Friedrichstraße and Sedanstraße (now Andrzeja Mielęckiego Street) lies 264.2 meters above sea level.

The straightened roads and routes from the early industrial period were preserved and incorporated into the city street network, while two main communication axes — the latitudinal one (now Chorzowska Street, continuing as Warszawska Street) and the longitudinal one (now Wojciech Korfanty Avenue, continuing as Pocztowa and Tadeusz Kościuszko Streets) — became the main framework of the downtown urban grid.

A distinctive feature of the city’s landscape during its earliest development was the villa district, stretching along the eastern section of the main urban axis — the Mysłowice Road (today’s Warszawska Street). At the beginning of the 20th century, Warszawska Street was the main eastern entrance road into Katowice. On June 20, 1922, General Stanisław Szeptycki and his troops entered the city along this street. In 1926, the street was renamed in honor of Marshal Józef Piłsudski.

On the wall of the building at No. 6, there is a memorial plaque, funded in 1962 by the people of Katowice, in honor of Andrzej Mielęcki, who was murdered by German militias on August 17, 1920.

In 1927, the Hil and Berek Sztrochlic brothers from Będzin founded a printing workshop called Drukarnia Handlowa (“Commercial Printing House”) at 33 Piłsudski Street. In the autumn of 1927, parts of the street were paved with wooden cobblestones.

In the 1930s, the Third Police Precinct was located at No. 49, and at No. 21 there was the “Czora” Hotel with three rooms. During World War II, Friedrichstraße housed the headquarters of the Schlesische AG für Bergbau und Zinkhüttenbetrieb (Silesian Mining and Zinc Smelting Company).

In the 1960s and 1970s, part of the buildings between 3 Maja, Warszawska, and Juliusz Słowacki Streets were demolished due to the construction of the new railway station. In 1981, the Silesian Theatre opened its Chamber Stage here (Warszawska 2).

In 2009, the tram tracks were modernized at a cost of about 30 million złoty; the tracks were embedded in prefabricated concrete slabs, and several tram stops with one-lane-wide platforms were added, thereby reducing car lanes. All stops received new shelters and were protected by barriers shielding pedestrians from splashes caused by passing cars.

In 1999, the tenement house at 9 Warszawska Street (on the corner with Andrzeja Mielęckiego Street) collapsed.

== Buildings ==
- Kościół Zmartwychwstania Pańskiego (Protestant Church)
- Old tenement houses
