= Stawowa Street =

Street in Katowice, Poland

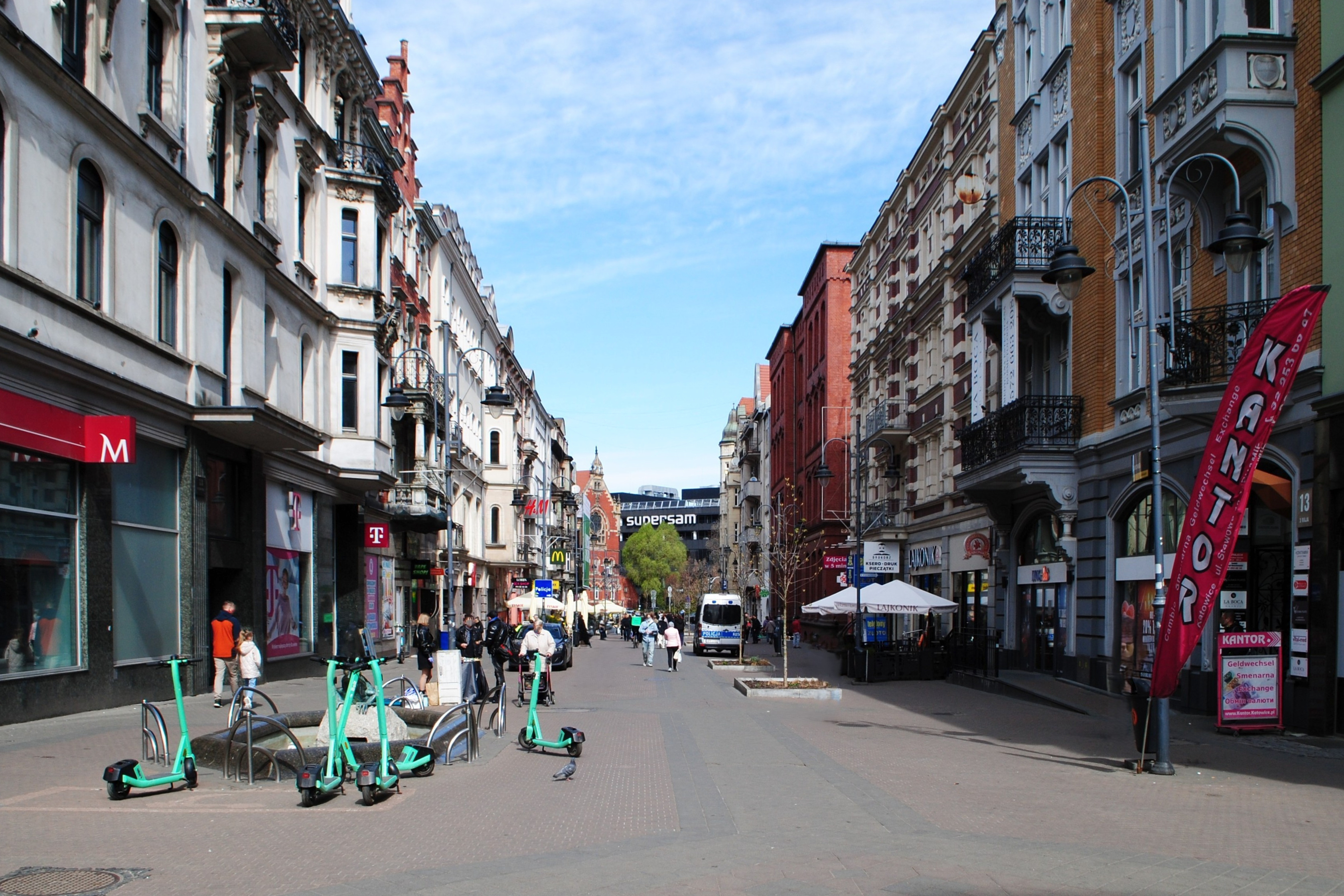
- Stawowa Street facing north (2025)
- Interactive map of Stawowa Street
- Former name(s): Lazarettstraße, Teichstraße, Woyrschstraße
- Part of: Śródmieście
- Length: 250 m (820 ft)
- Location: Katowice, Silesian Voivodeship, Poland
- Coordinates: 50°15′37.11″N 19°01′05.96″E
- From: Piotr Skarga Street
- Major junctions: Adam Mickiewicz Street (Synagogue Square, 65 m); Fryderyk Chopin Street (80 m)
- To: 3 Maja Street (250 m)

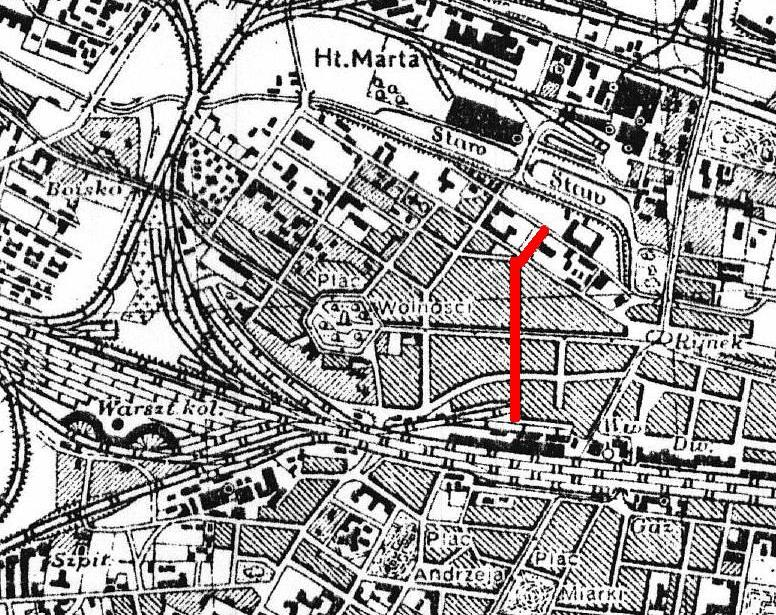
Stawowa Street, marked with a red line, on a 1933 map by the Military Geographical Institute

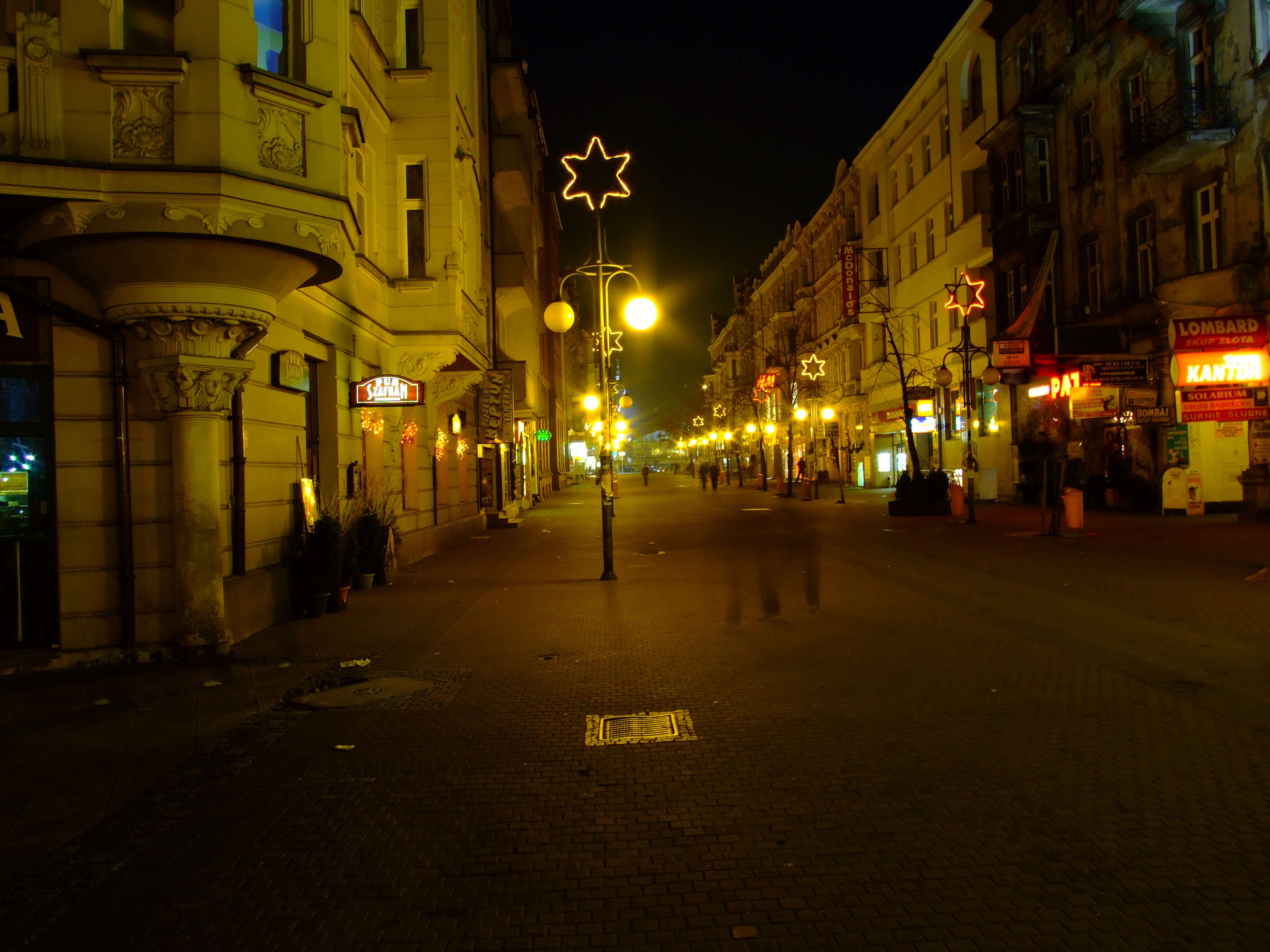
Stawowa Street at night

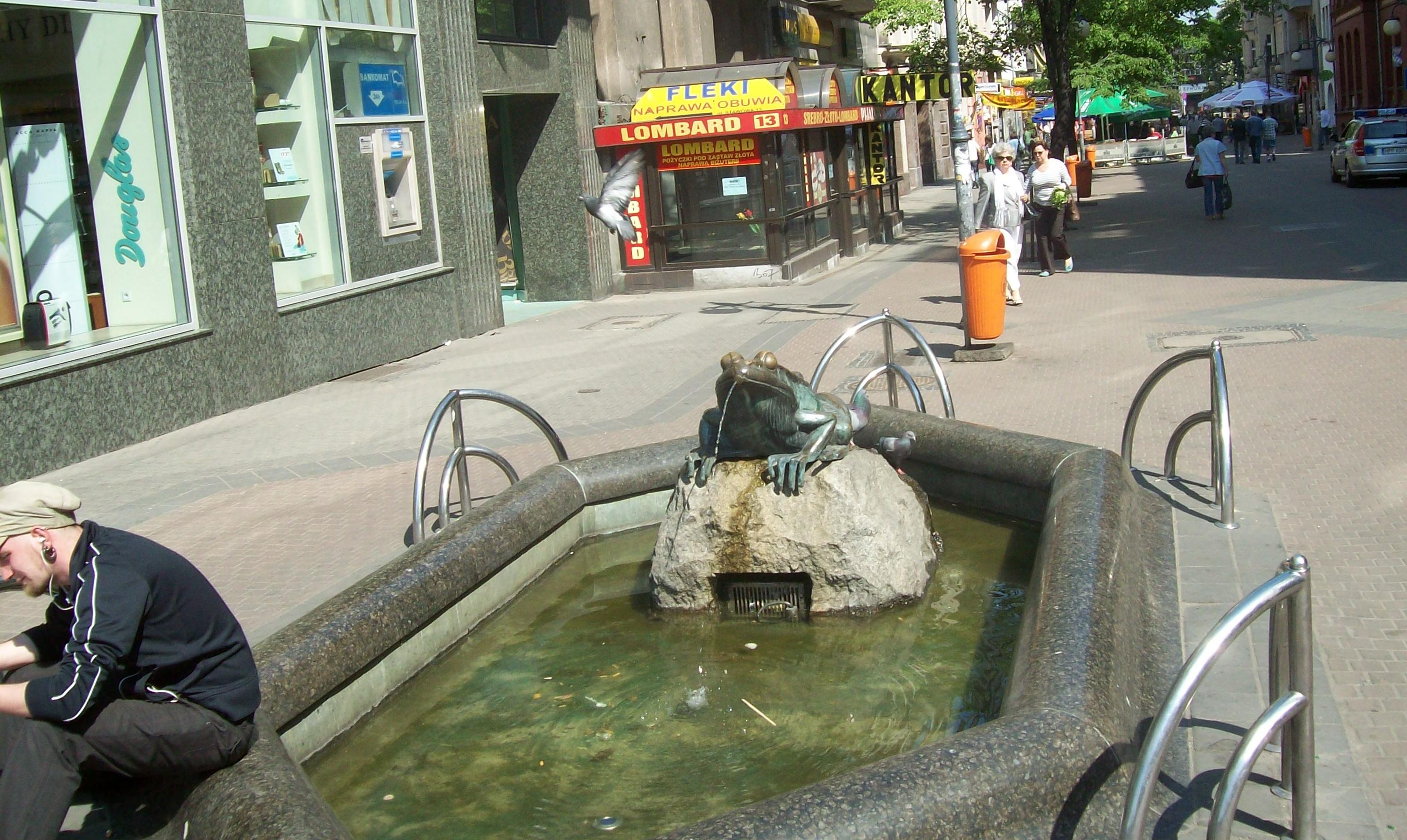
Żabka fountain on Stawowa Street

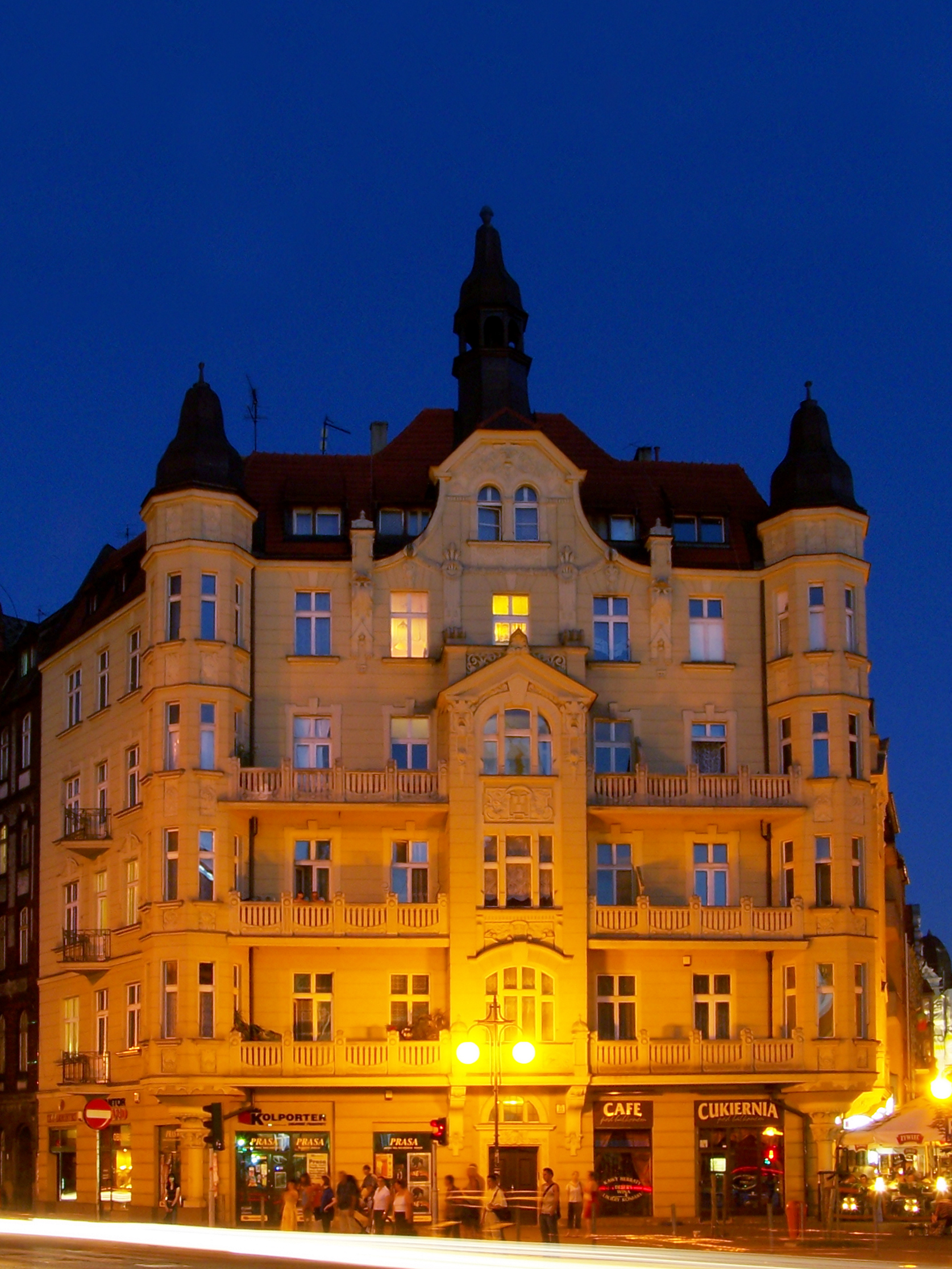
Tenement at the corner of Adam Mickiewicz and Stawowa streets

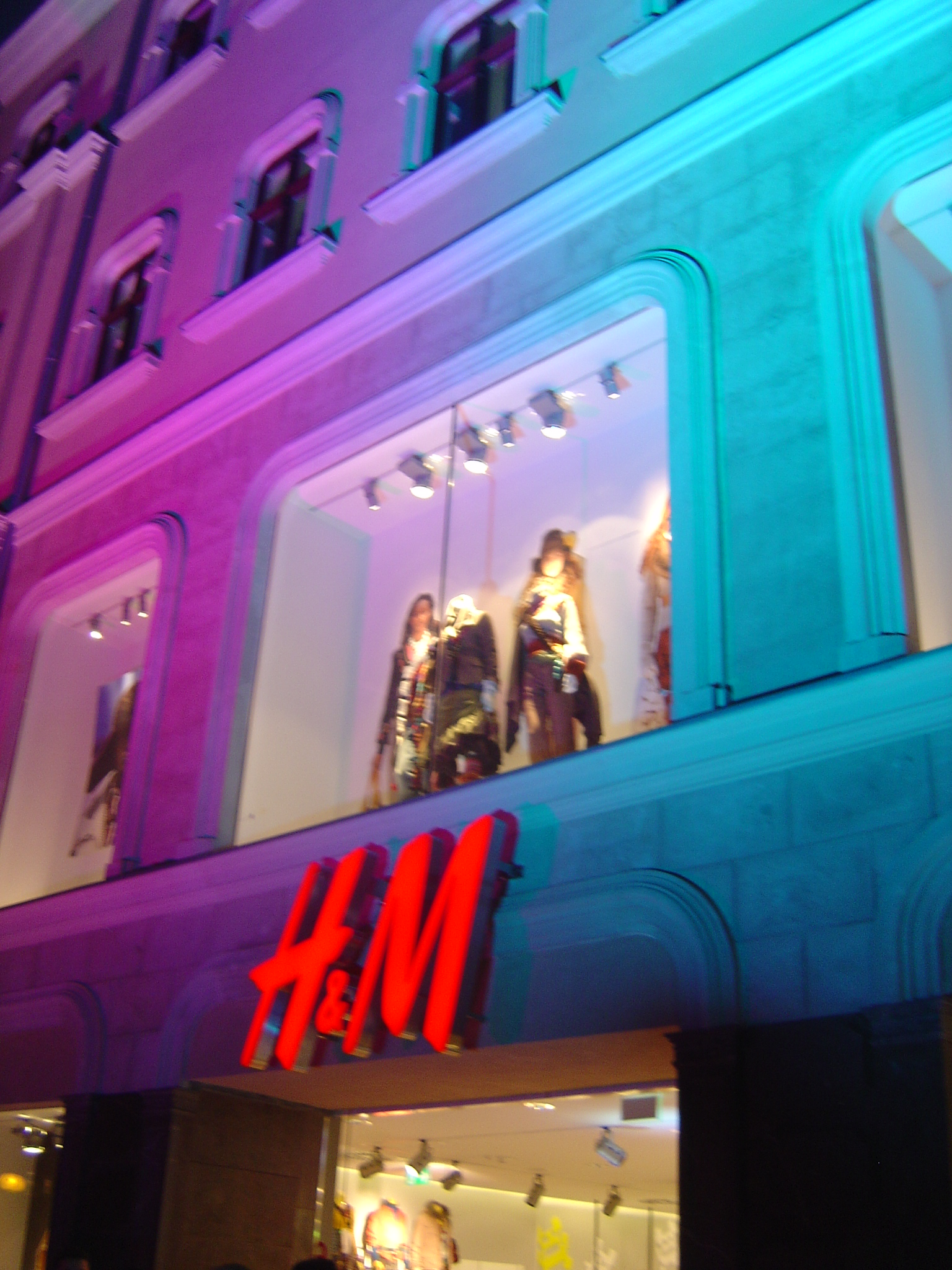
One of many shops on Stawowa Street

Stawowa Street (German: Lazarettstraße, Teichstraße, 1939–1945: Woyrschstraße) is one of the most prominent and well-known pedestrian streets in the Śródmieście district of Katowice, Poland. Its name likely derives from a pond (Polish: staw) that once existed behind Piotr Skarga Street. The street begins at the intersection with Piotr Skarga Street, intersects with Adam Mickiewicz Street (where bus traffic is permitted), and becomes a pedestrian zone thereafter, ending at 3 Maja Street. It serves as a commercial and service-oriented pedestrian passage, recognized as a significant public space with representative and socially integrative functions. In the late 1990s, due to high pedestrian traffic, it was one of the most prominent areas in Katowice's city center. A 2005 study identified it as one of the few central areas perceived as pleasant and well-maintained.

== History ==
In 1857, near the present-day intersection of Adam Mickiewicz Street and Stawowa Street, the Jakob ironworks (German: Jakobshütte) was established by the Kremski, Kożuszek, Klaus, and Rosse company. It included a steam-powered forge and foundry but was dismantled by the late 19th century. Since 1871, a school has operated on the street, housing a German minority school and kindergarten until 1939. The current section of the street (numbers from 1 to 13) was developed in the 1890s as the manor area was built up after the ironworks closed. Tenements at Wilhelm Szewczyk Square (numbers from 1 to 5) remain from the southern part. On 13 October 1890, the Katowice City Council named the street Lazarettstraße. In 1911, the Gazeta Ludowa newspaper began publication with its editorial office on Stawowa Street. From 1906 to 1922, the Kuryer Śląski, founded by Wojciech Korfanty, was based at 8 Stawowa Street.

In 1922, the street was renamed Stawowa Street, reverted to Woyrschstraße during the German occupation (1939–1945), and then restored to Stawowa Street. Until 1939, 8 Stawowa Street housed the editorial offices of Der Oberschlesische Kurier and Ostschlesische Post. During the interwar period, a horse-drawn cab stand operated at the corner of 3 Maja and Stawowa streets. At 16 Stawowa Street, a Christian Union Prayer House and a Paramount film rental office operated. At 19 Stawowa Street, the Carioka bar and Stylowy cinema were located.

On 20 April 1945, the school at 6 Stawowa Street resumed operations, later becoming Maria Curie-Skłodowska Elementary School. It operated there until 2017, when it was relocated to 23 Sokolska Street. Since 2023, the building has housed a private Canadian Maple Bear school, the first of its kind in Poland.

In the 1960s, buildings beyond the intersection with 3 Maja Street were demolished, including the Kaiserhof Hotel at 19 Stawowa Street, which housed the German Jewish Concordia Masonic lodge from 1894. In the mid-1970s, a fountain featuring a 100-kilogram brass frog with water spouting from its mouth was installed near 3 Maja Street, symbolizing the former pond (now the site of an Empik store). The Żabka fountain became a popular meeting point for residents. On 11 December 1992, the first McDonald's in Silesia and third in Poland opened at 5 Stawowa Street. Nearby, at 3 Maja and Adam Mickiewicz streets, there are bus and tram stops operated by the Metropolitan Transport Authority.

== Buildings and institutions ==
The following historic buildings are located on Stawowa Street:

- Residential-commercial tenement (3 Stawowa Street); built in 1897 by architect Louis Dame in an eclectic style with Baroque Revival and northern Renaissance Revival elements, designed on a U-shaped plan. In 1924, the four-storey building was rebuilt according to a design by Albert Kohler. The façade has a classicizing character, and the seven-axis front elevation is plastered. The rear annex is covered with a steep gable roof with dormer windows. Bay windows are placed on the outer and central axes, with the central one located above a carriage gateway covered by rib vaulting on transverse arches. Above it, there is a portal with decorative elements and half-columns, as well as balconies with solid plaster balustrades. The lower part of the façade features Ionic pilasters in the giant order. Baroque Revival motifs adorn the stucco decorations on the panels beneath the windows. Inside, double-flight stairs and the original baluster railing have been preserved.
- Historic tenement (4 Stawowa Street); listed in the Register of Cultural Property (no. A/1678/97, 17 December 1997). Built in 1906 in the Art Nouveau style by the German construction company Perl & Trapp, it was renovated in 1932. The five-story building, planned in an inverted L-shape, features a two-wing structure with a gabled roof. The seven-axis facade, lacking upper-level decorations, is asymmetrical, with the entrance gate on the third axis. Balconies have full plastered balustrades. The interior includes double-flight stairs with a wooden balustrade and windows with colored glass.
- Historic eclectic tenement (7 Stawowa Street); built between 1896 and 1897 according to a design by Ludwig Goldstein, on a U-shaped plan. The building features a three-wing rear annex. The roof is gable, and the plastered, rusticated, and symmetrical façade has a remodelled basement zone. The carriage gateway, located on the central axis of the building, features a groin vault on transverse arches with decorative corbels. It is topped with an ornate portal flanked by pilasters. On the outer axes, there are balcony loggias enclosed by stone balustrades with balusters. Inside the building, double-flight stairs with the original wooden balustrade have been preserved. During the interwar period, the Ursus film rental office operated there.
- Residential-commercial tenement (8 Stawowa Street); built at the end of the 19th century in the historicist style. The designer is unknown, although it is assumed that the builder Czieslik, who carried out the building's static calculations, may have been the author of the design. The seven-storey building was erected on a rectangular plan, aligned with the street frontage. It features rear and side annexes and a simple body faced with red brick, with an asymmetrical front façade and plastered architectural detailing. The carriage gateway, located on the building's central axis, is closed with a full arch and has a dome on transverse arches supported by pilasters. The gable roof has a slight slope. Rounded corners were used near the balconies. Inside, the original window woodwork and double-flight staircase with the original wooden balustrade with balusters have been preserved.
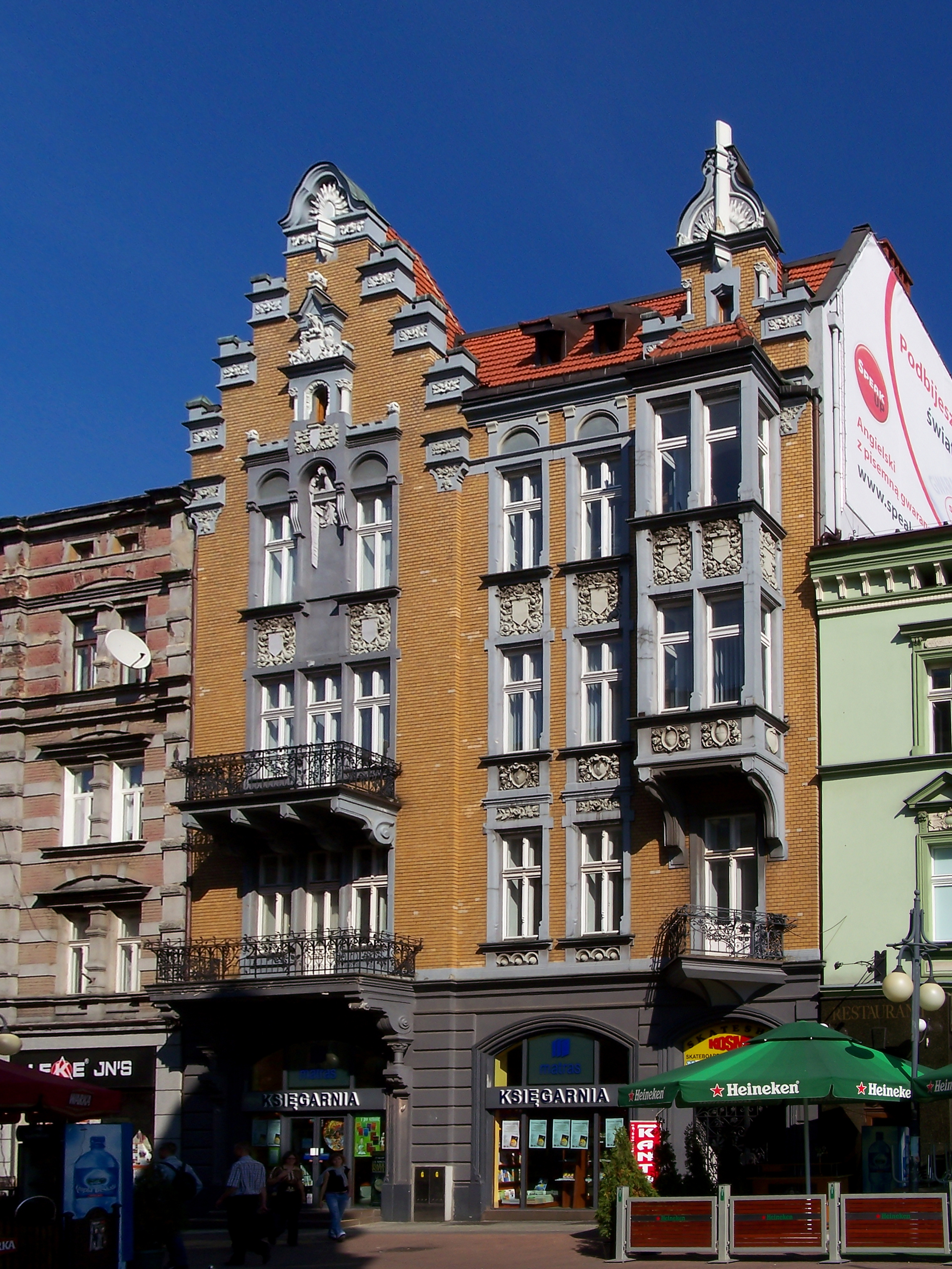
- Tenement on 10 Stawowa Street (built in 1896)
  Tenement (10 Stawowa Street); built in 1896 in the North Renaissance Revival style, on a plan resembling the letter L. The design was by Max Grünfeld (or possibly Georg Zimmermann). The four-storey building with a basement and attic, covered with a gable roof tiled with ceramic shingles, has a compact body articulated by a avant-corps crowned with a stepped gable and a two-storey, three-sided bay window. The front façade is asymmetrical. Decorative consoles support balconies with wrought-iron balustrades. The plastered, rusticated ground floor has three bays. Moulded window surrounds were applied to the arched window openings. A bay window is located on the third and fourth axes. Beneath the windows are panels containing cartouches and plant-like decorative motifs. Floral polychromy has been preserved on the cross vault of the carriage gateway, which rests on transverse arches supported by lesenes. Inside the building, there is a staircase with windows (retaining etched glass panes) and a double-flight stairway with a wrought-iron balustrade. During the interwar period, the building housed the Zdrój Okocimski restaurant and the sales office of the Blacha Cynkowa zinc rolling mill. Until 1932, it was also home to the Chamber of Crafts.
- Residential-commercial tenement (11 Stawowa Street); built in 1893 in the North Renaissance Revival (German) style, on an L-shaped plan. The design was by architect Ignatz Grünfeld. The four-storey, basemented building has a two-winged structure with a central avant-corps (slightly projecting, topped with a stepped gable and featuring a richly decorated columned balcony loggia). The entrance door is located on the outer axis. The four-bay façade is symmetrical and faced with red brick, featuring plaster architectural details. The building is covered with a steep gable roof with dormers. The window openings are set in plaster surrounds, with decorative pediments placed only above the second-storey windows. Inside the hallway, the original stone flooring, ceiling facet, and ceramic wall cladding have been preserved, as well as a double-flight staircase with a metal balustrade.
- Historic tenement (13 Stawowa Street, corner with 3 Maja Street); listed in the Register of Cultural Property (no. A/1306/83, 7 July 1983). The four-storey, basemented building was erected on a plan close to a rectangle, with a side annex and a rounded corner. Its two-winged structure features small bay windows topped with balconies with decorative wrought-iron balustrades. The window openings are framed with plaster surrounds. The third-storey windows are topped with cornices supported by consoles, and between them are sculpted angel heads. The windows on the fourth, sixth, and corner axes are crowned with flanked domes. The façade is topped with a Baroque Revival stucco frieze and a cornice supported by consoles. Until 1939, the building housed a branch of the Bavarian Insurance Company (Bayrische Versicherungsbank).
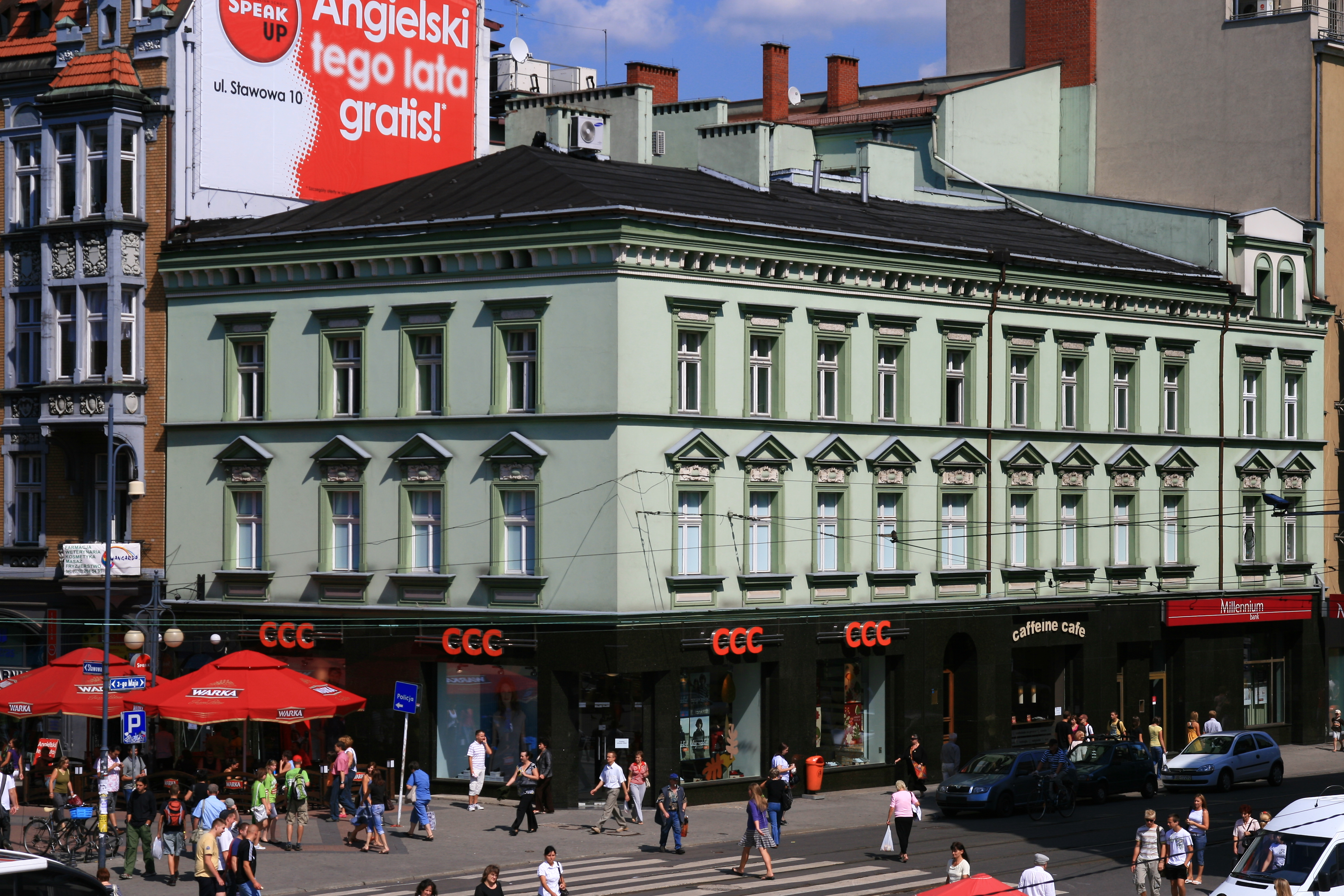
- Oswald Findeisen's Tenement at the corner of Stawowa and 3 Maja streets
  Oswald Findeisen's Baroque Revival Tenement (13 3 Maja Street, corner with 10 Stawowa Street); built in the late 19th century in a Baroque Revival style. Originally, the façade was designed in the "round arches" style and featured rustication. The building was likely remodelled in the 1890s, at which time it acquired its present Renaissance Revival appearance. It was erected on a plan in the shape of an inverted letter L. The three-storey, two-winged structure includes a basement, an attic, a gable roof, and a small gable on the southern façade.
- Tenement at the corner of 22 Adam Mickiewicz Street and 2 Stawowa Street; built in 1906 in an eclectic style by Perl & Trapp. The five-story building, on a U-shaped plan with a three-wing structure, features corner bay windows with turrets topped by helmets and a full-arch portal.

Additional historic buildings include residential tenements at 5 and 9 Stawowa Street and a school building from the early 20th century at 6 Stawowa Street.

In 2011, Stawowa Street hosted institutions such as Maria Curie-Skłodowska Elementary School, Police Station No. VI, the Inicjatywa Student Association, currency exchanges, bank branches, shops, commercial-service companies, restaurants, a bookstore, travel agencies, language schools, and an architectural office.
