= Market Square, Katowice =

Square in Katowice, Poland

Coordinates: 50°15′33″N 19°01′18″E

Market Square
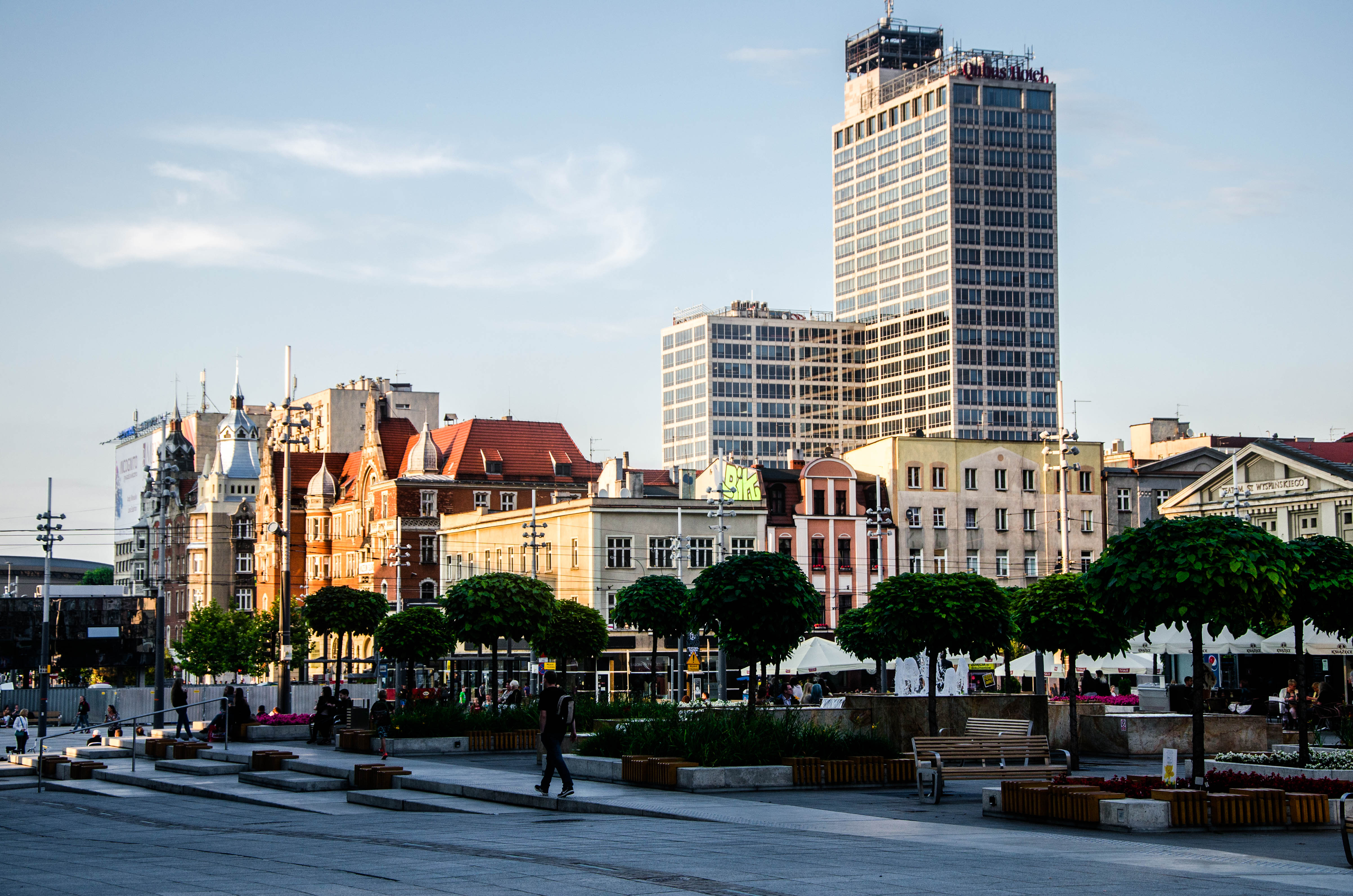
- View of the Market Square, Altus Skyscraper in the background
- Interactive map of Market Square
- Native name: Rynek w Katowicach (Polish)
- Namesake: Rynek
- Type: Market square
- Maintained by: Katowice City Council
- Location: Śródmieście, Katowice, Poland

Market Square in Katowice (Polish: Rynek w Katowicach) is a central feature of the Śródmieście district in the city of Katowice, Poland. This market square, the main one in the city, dates to the late 19th century. It has been rebuilt several times, with the latest round of changes currently in progress. During the communist era, some of the historic buildings were demolished to make way for modern service facilities. A characteristic feature of the square is a network of streetcar tracks, crossing the square in several directions. There are three squares within the marketplace: Kwiatowy, Teatralny, and Obrońców Katowic.

The Silesian Theatre is located there.

In the 2010s the city has started to redesign the square. The Rynek, as understood by the Katowice authorities, is a central place and a showpiece of the city. Obrońców Katowic Square is a location of the Monument to the September Scouts. On the square and in the neighboring streets a hot-spot provides free wireless internet access. At noon, Katowice's bugle call is played from the top of a tenement house at the intersection of Młyńska and Pocztowa Streets. The author of the music is an amateur composer from Bytom, Adam Biernacki. The custom of playing the bugle-call has a short tradition, it was created in 2002.

== Sights and institutions ==
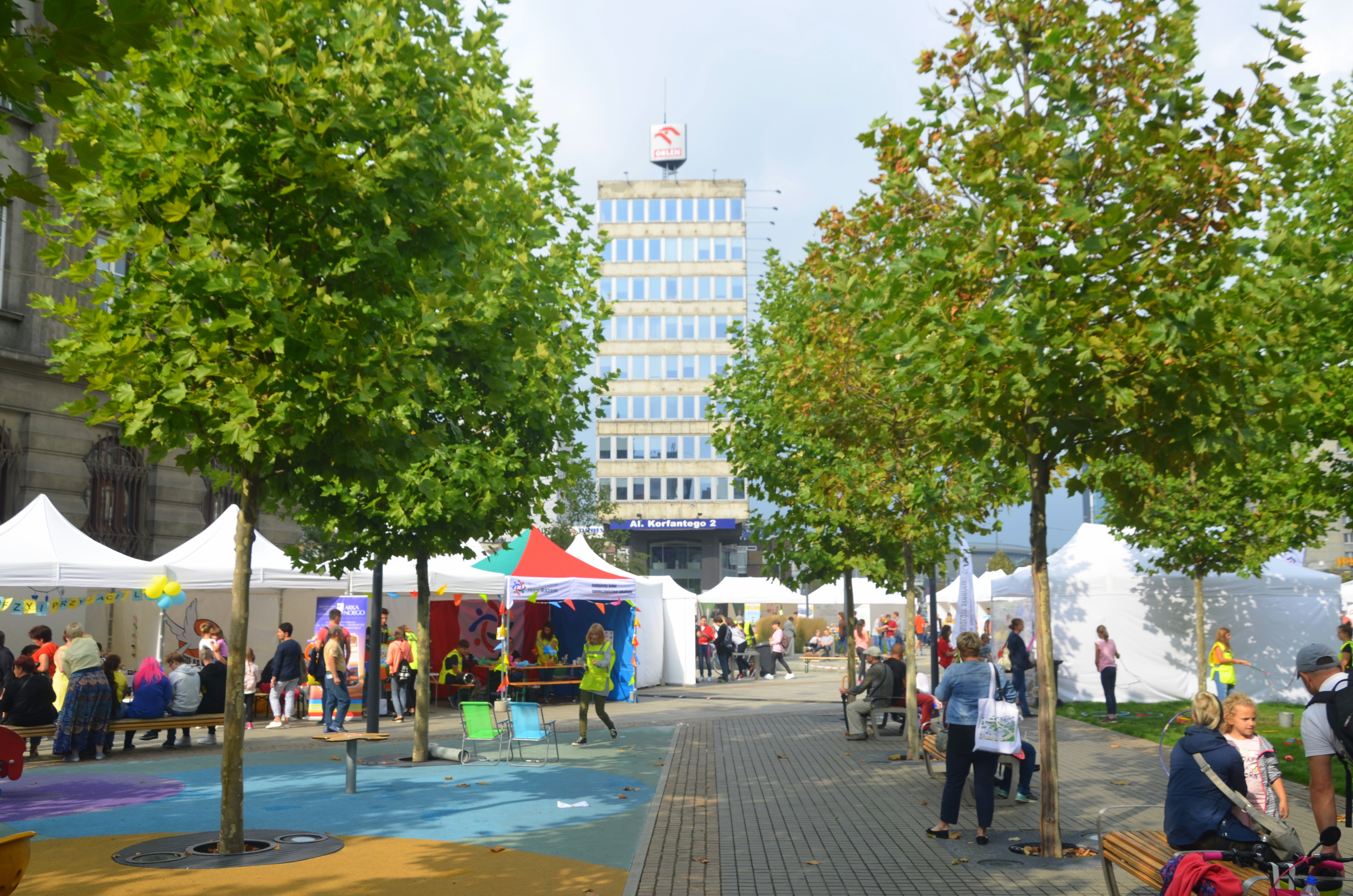
Katowice Market Square in 2018

The following historic buildings are located at the Market Square:

- Stanisław Wyspiański Silesian Theatre
- Apartment house (Rynek 7)
- Apartment house (Rynek 8)
- Tenement house, former bank (Rynek 9), erected in 1907

Around the Market Square are located such buildings as:

- Silesian Press House
- Skarbek Cooperative Department Store, completed in 1975
- Zenit Cooperative Department Store, erected in 1962

The following are located at the Market Square:

- Tourist Information Center and Upper Silesian Branch of PTTK (Rynek 13)

== Gallery ==
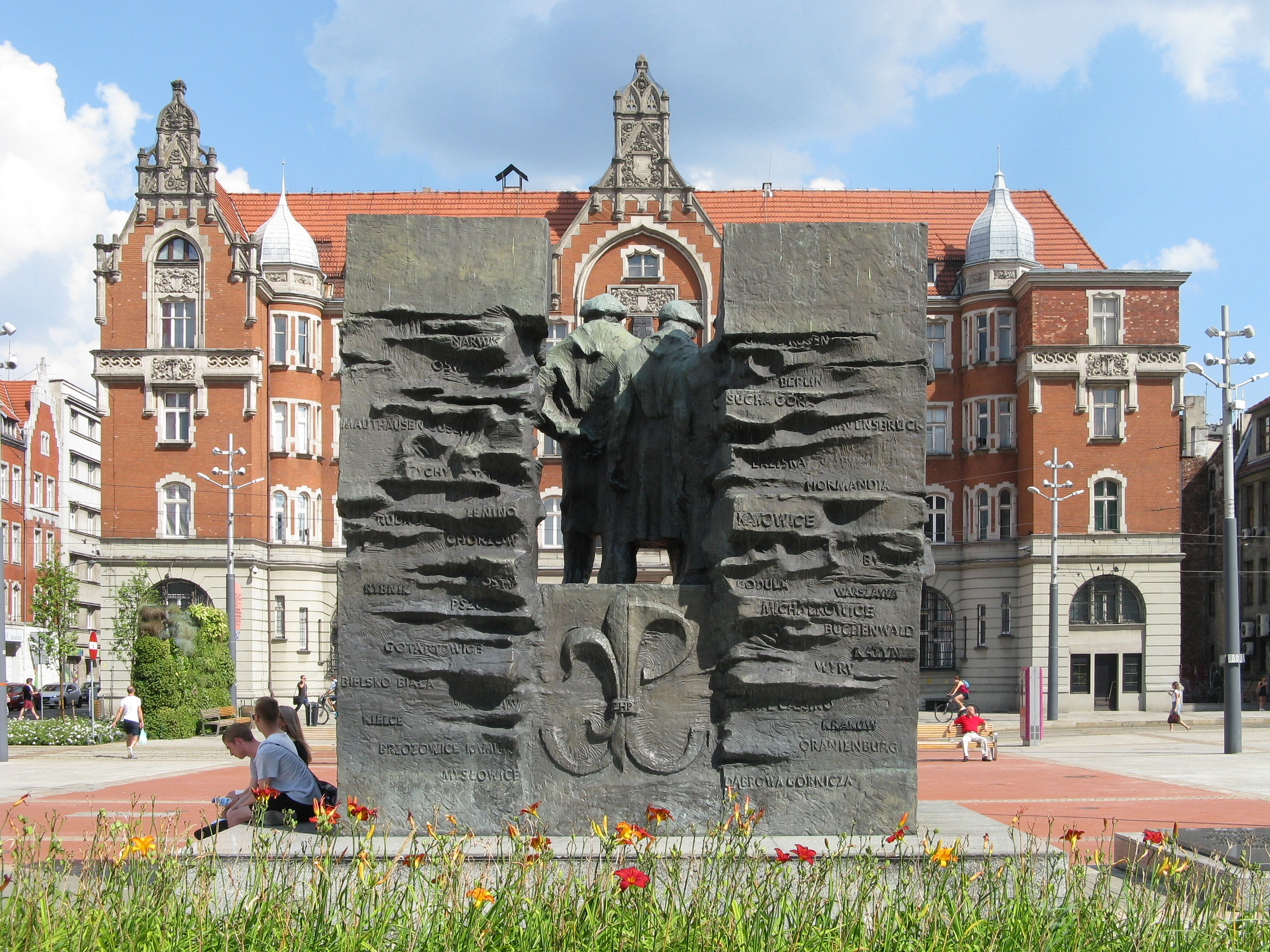
September Scouts Monument facing the former Silesian Museum

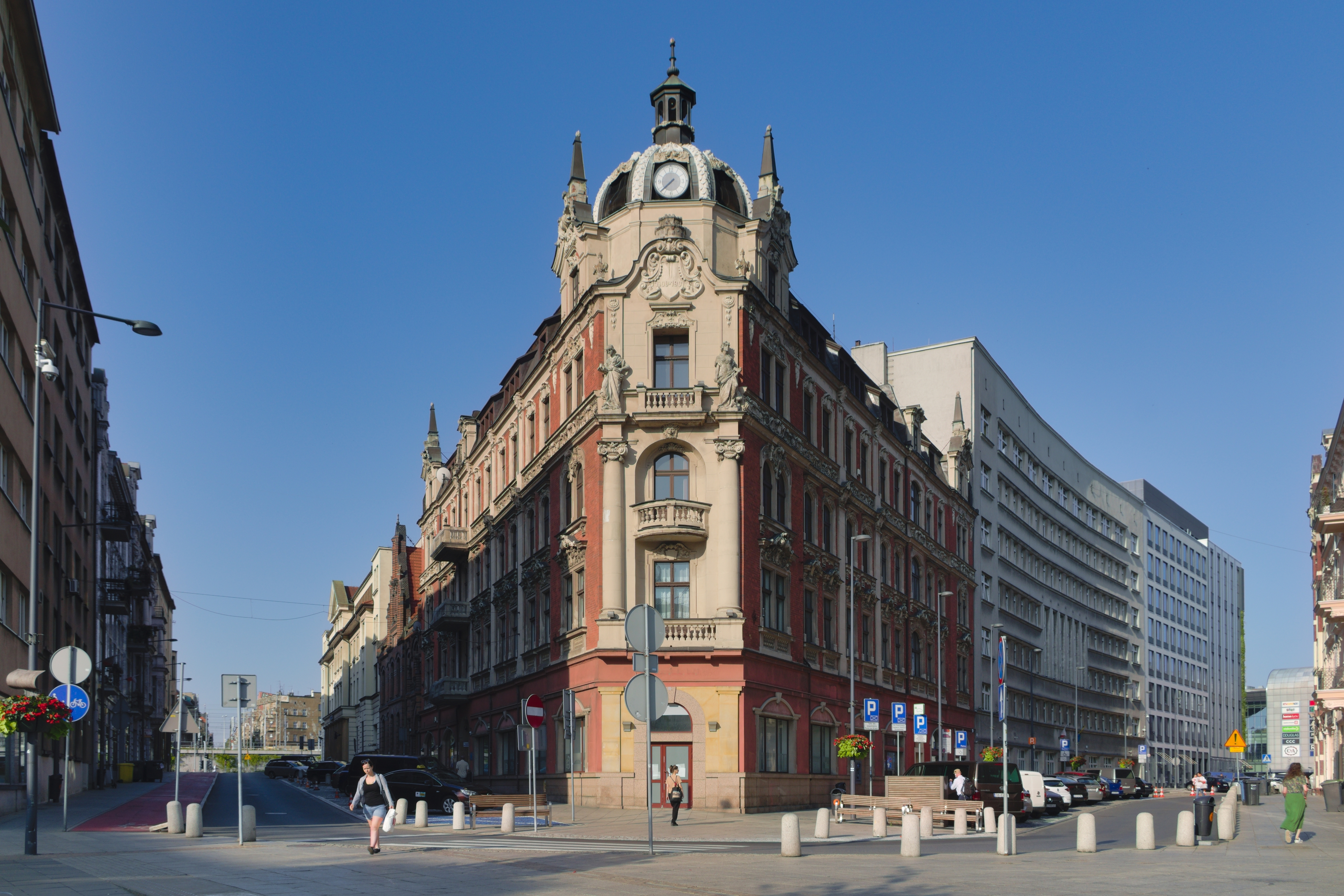
A historic townhouse at 2 Młyńska Street

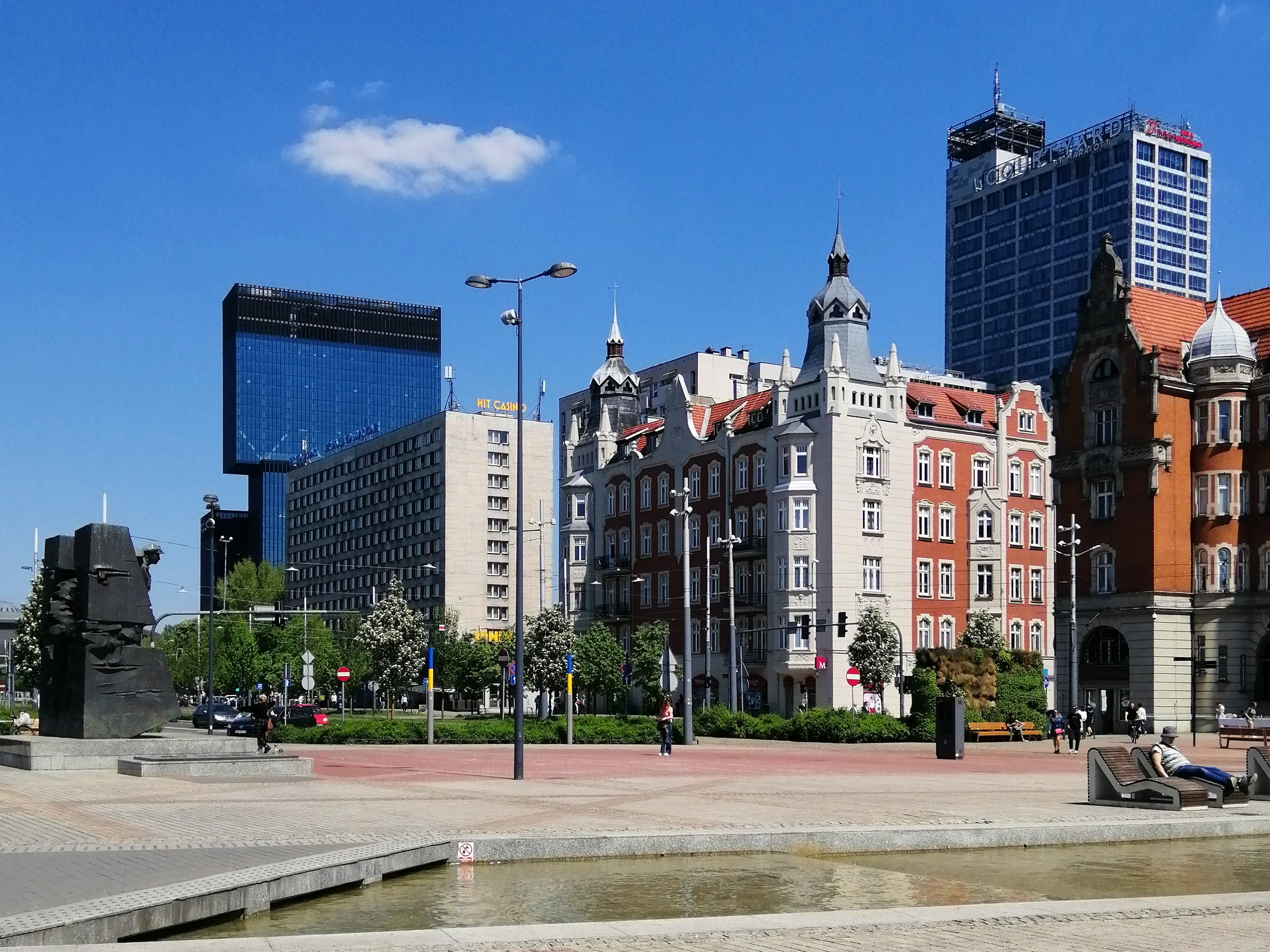
View of Korfanty Avenue

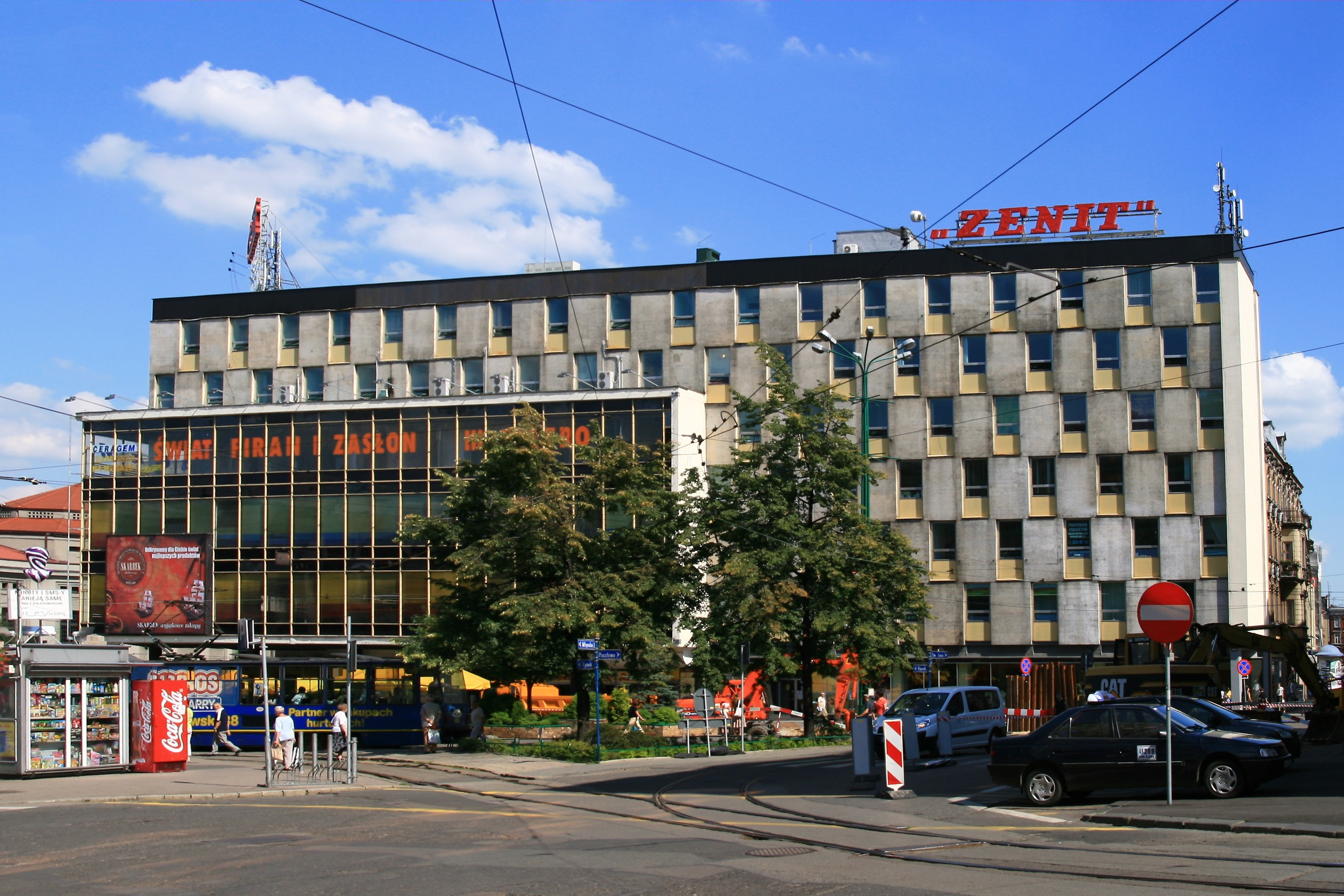
Zenit Cooperative Department Store

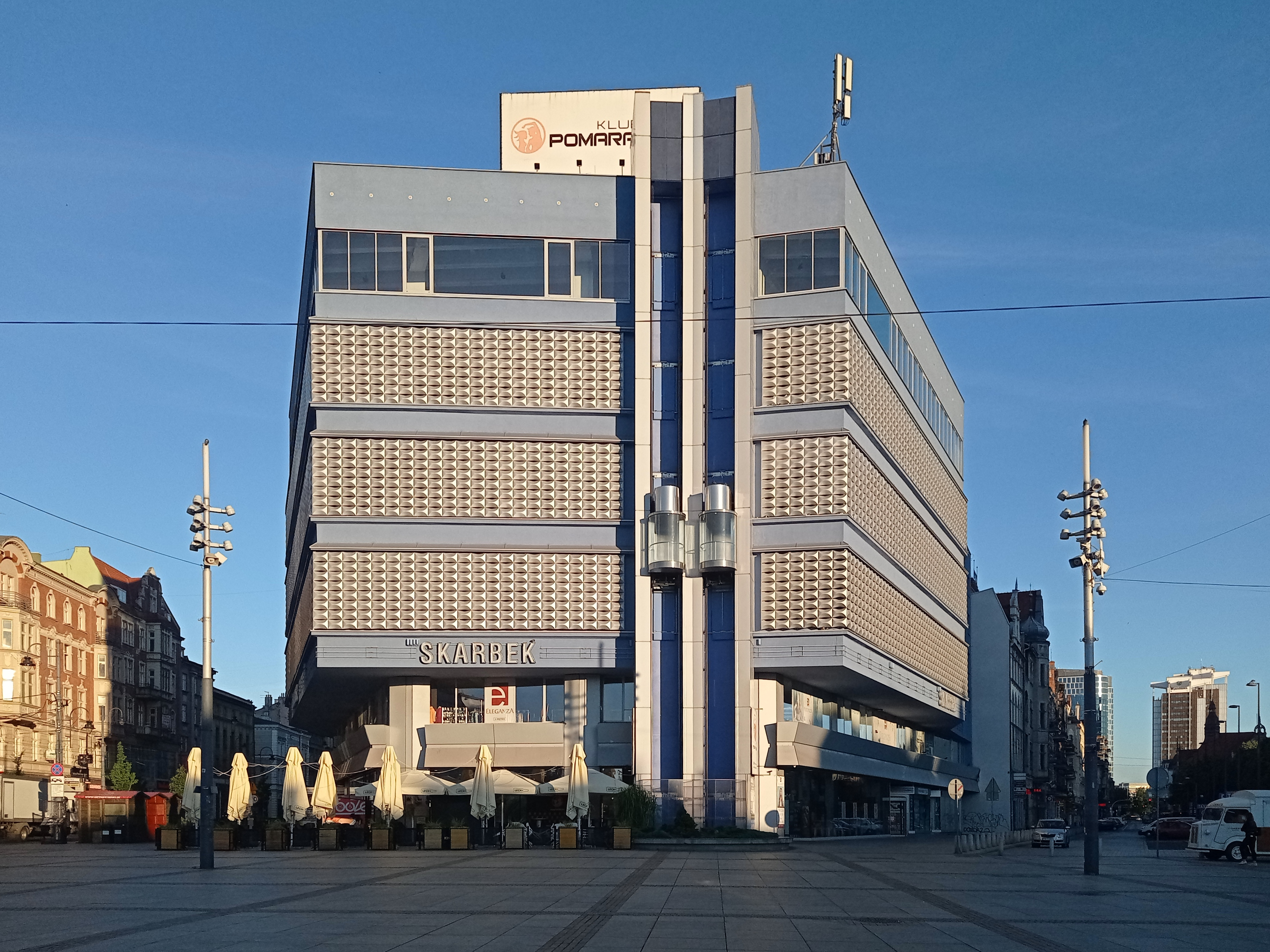
Skarbek Cooperative Department Store

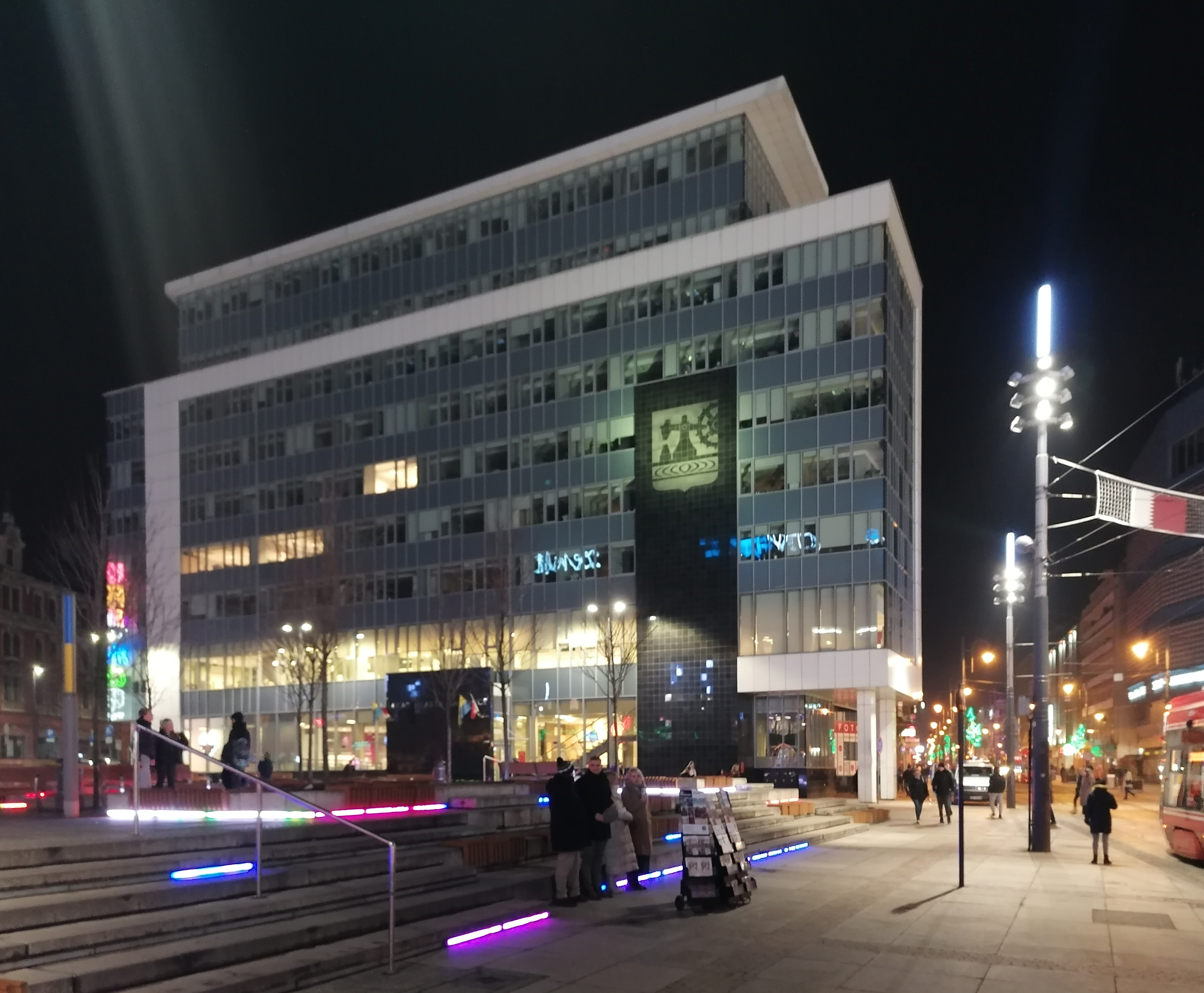
Silesian Press House

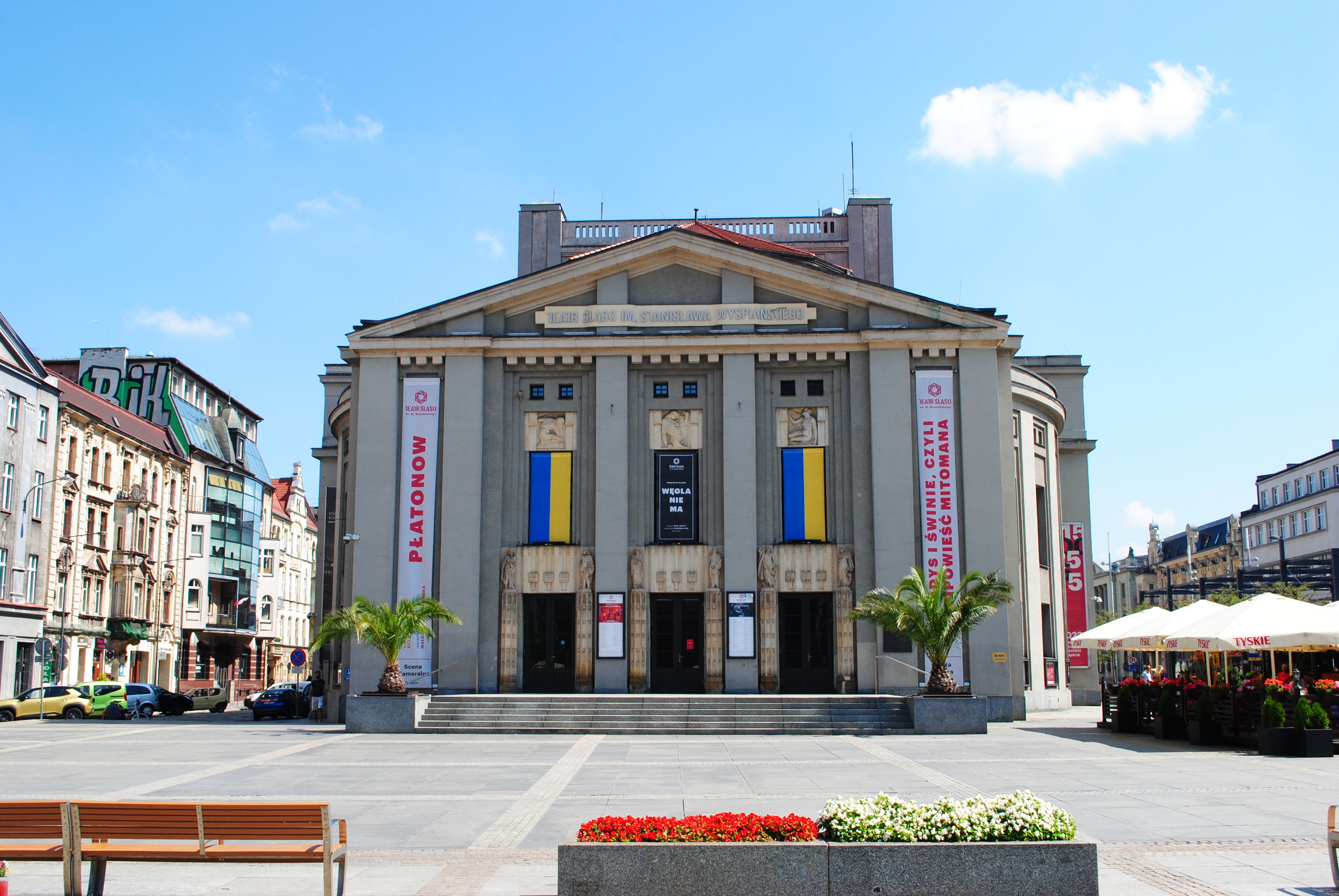
Silesian Theatre

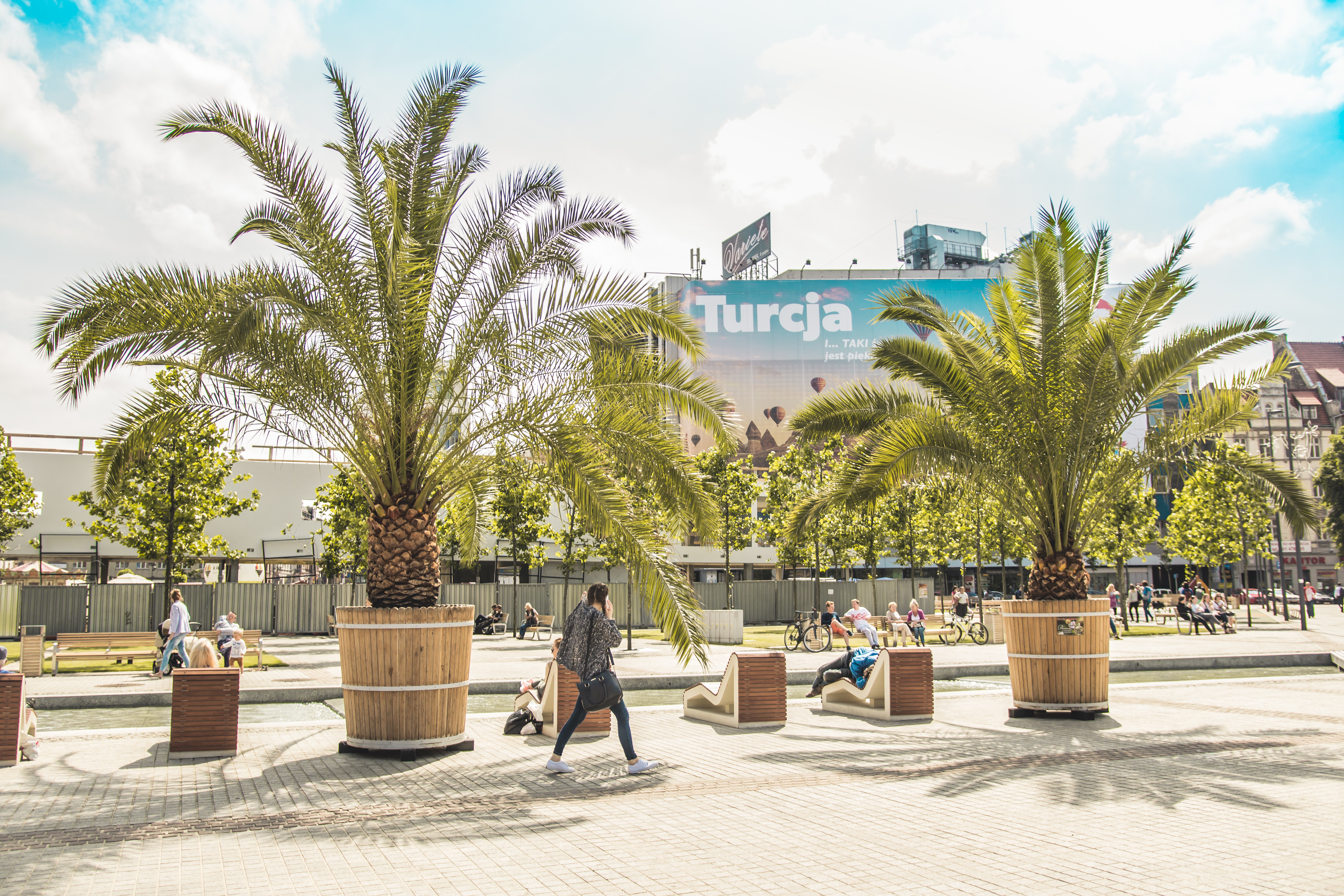
Palms on the Market Square

== See also ==
- Śródmieście, Katowice
- History of Katowice
