= History of Katowice =

Historical affiliations

Kingdom of Poland 1054 – c. 1325

- Duchy of Silesia 1202–1335

Kingdom of Bohemia 1335–1469
Kingdom of Hungary 1469–1490
Kingdom of Bohemia 1490–1526
Habsburg monarchy 1526–1742

- Kingdom of Bohemia

Kingdom of Prussia 1742–1871
German Empire 1871–1918
contested in Silesian Uprisings 1919-1921
Republic of Poland 1921–1939
Nazi Germany 1939–1945 (occupation)
People's Republic of Poland 1945–1989
Republic of Poland 1989–present

The map of the historic settlements in the area of Katowice

The history of Katowice spans over 600 years.

== Early history ==
The territory became part of the emerging Polish state in the 10th century. Katowice started as a conglomerate of a number of small farming and industrial village communities from the 14th century. Katowice itself was first mentioned under its present name as a village in the 16th century.

Following the annexation by Prussia after the War of the Austrian Succession in the middle of the 18th century, a slow migration of German merchants began to the area, which, until then, was inhabited primarily by a Polish population. With the development of industry, in the mid-19th century the village started to evolve into an industrial settlement. Katowice was renamed to the German Kattowitz and around 1865 was granted municipal rights. The Prussian authorities hoped that the town, which by 1867 had a population that was 50% Polish, would gradually become a centre for the Germanization of Silesia. The town flourished due to large mineral (especially coal) deposits in the nearby mountains. Extensive city growth and prosperity depended on the coal mining and steel industries, which took off during the Industrial Revolution. In 1884, 36 Jewish Zionist delegates met in Katowice, forming the Hovevei Zion movement. In 1873 the city became the capital of the new Prussian Kattowitz district. In 1896 a deadly accident killed 104 miners in the Kleofas coal mine disaster. On 1 April 1899, it was separated from the district and became an independent city.

Polish Reading Rooms for Women were established in Katowice and Załęże in 1903 and 1906, respectively. In 1913, a rally attended by thousands of Poles took place in Zadole. After World War I, Polish Women's Societies were founded in Brynów, Ligota and Załęska Hałda.

== After World War I ==
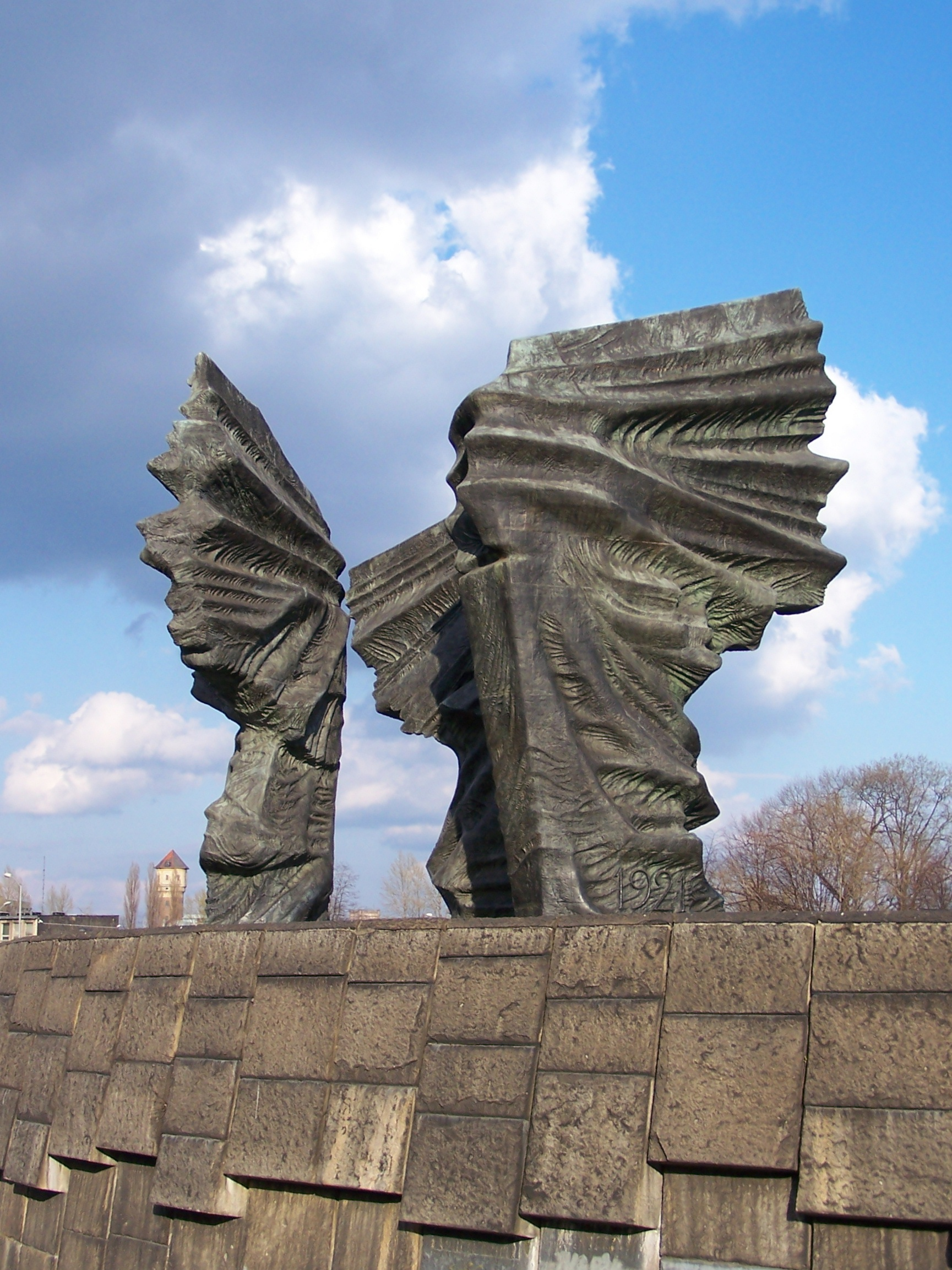
The Silesian Uprising monument in Katowice

According to the Treaty of Versailles, the fate of Upper Silesia was to be settled by a plebiscite, which was held on 20 March 1921. Over 85% of the city's population voted to remain in Germany, while the population in the surrounding rural district voted 56% in favour of Poland. The Allies were in disagreement as to where the new border should be drawn, with the French proposal being more generous to Poland, while the British proposal was more favourable to Germany. After rumours spread that the British proposal was to be adopted by the League of Nations, the Third Silesian Uprising broke out, and as a result, Katowice became part of the Second Polish Republic with a certain level of autonomy (Silesian Parliament as a constituency and Silesian Voivodeship Council as the executive body). A wave of Jewish settlers from other areas of Poland, particularly Galicia arrived to the city. The Jewish community played an important role in the development of Katowice and in 1937 a new Jewish communal building was erected.

== World War II ==
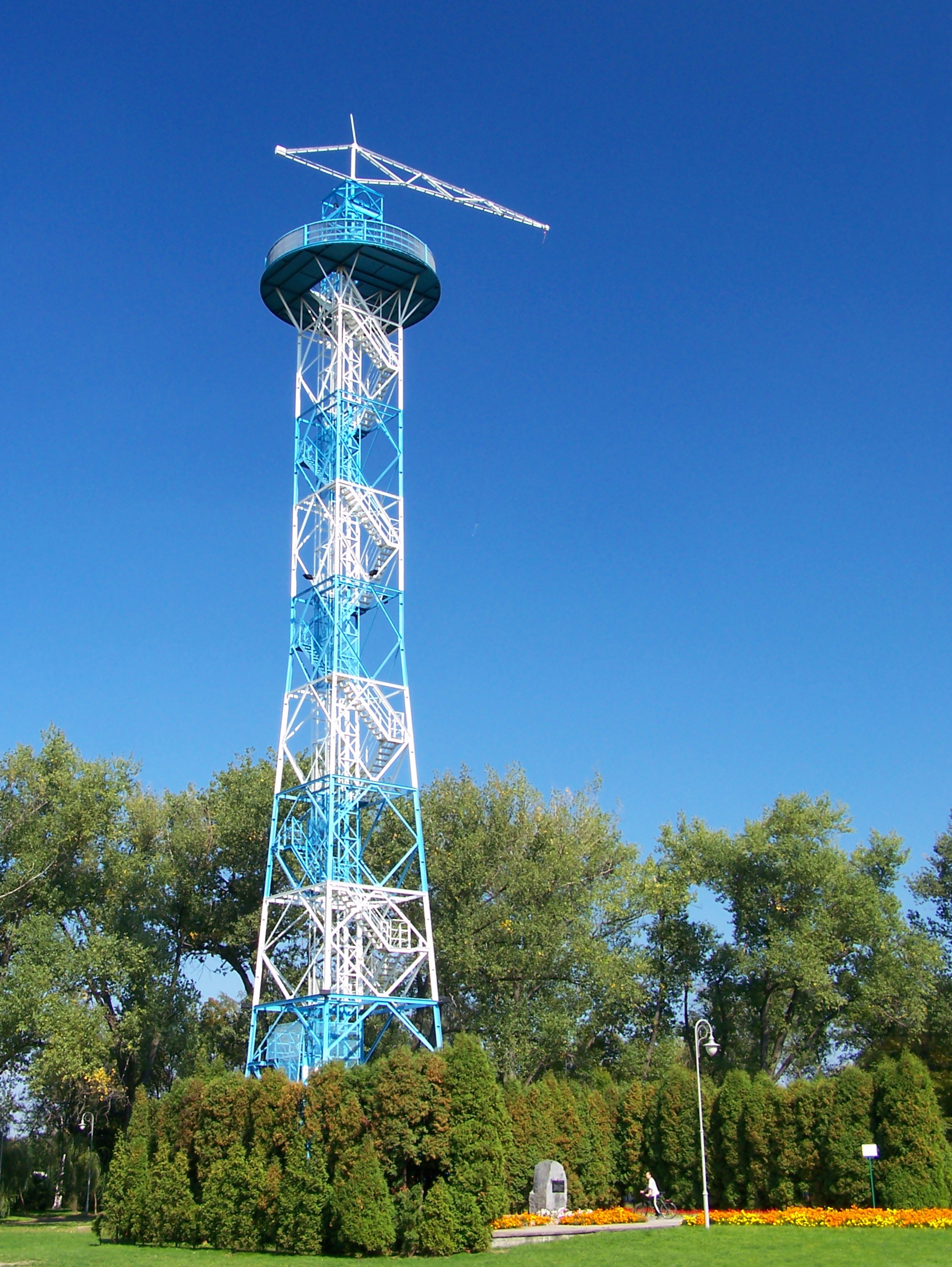
Parachute Tower, one of the symbols of the Polish Defense of Katowice

During the German invasion of Poland, which started World War II in September 1939, the city was defended by local Poles, and the invading Germans immediately carried out massacres of captured Polish defenders. During the invasion the Germans had burned the Great Synagogue. In the following weeks the German Einsatzkommando 1 was stationed in the city, and its units were responsible for many crimes against Poles committed in the region.

Under occupation, Katowice was annexed by Nazi Germany and became the capital of the Gau of Upper Silesia, replacing the former capital of Opole. Under Nazi rule, many of the city's historical monuments were destroyed, the street names were renamed to German and the use of the Polish language was banned. During the occupation, the German administration organized numerous public executions of civilians and about 700 Poles were beheaded with a purpose-built guillotine. By the middle of 1941, most of the Polish and Jewish population of the city was expelled.

The Germans established and operated a Nazi prison in the city, and multiple forced labour camps within present-day city limits, including two camps solely for Poles (Polenlager), four camps solely for Jews, two subcamps (E734, E750) of the Stalag VIII-B/344 prisoner-of-war camp for Allied POWs and a subcamp of the Auschwitz concentration camp. In January 1945, the Germans evacuated 30 prisoners from Katowice to Kłodzko.

Katowice was captured by the Red Army in January 1945. Significant parts of the city centre were destroyed during the capture. The city was restored to Poland, although with a Soviet-installed communist regime, which stayed in power until 1989.

== After World War II ==
In the 1950s Greeks, refugees of the Greek Civil War, settled in the city.

In 1953 Katowice was renamed Stalinogród ("Stalin Town") by the Polish communist government. However, the new name was never accepted by the city's population and in 1956 the former Katowice name was restored.

Severe ecological damage to the environment occurred during the post-Second World War time of communist governance in the People's Republic of Poland, but recent changes in regulations, procedures and policies of Polish government since the fall of Communism have reversed much of the harm that was done.

Due to economic reforms, there has been a shift away from heavy industry, and towards small businesses.
