= 3 Maja Street, Katowice =

Street in Katowice, Poland

Coordinates: 50.2596°N 19.0178°E

3 Maja Street
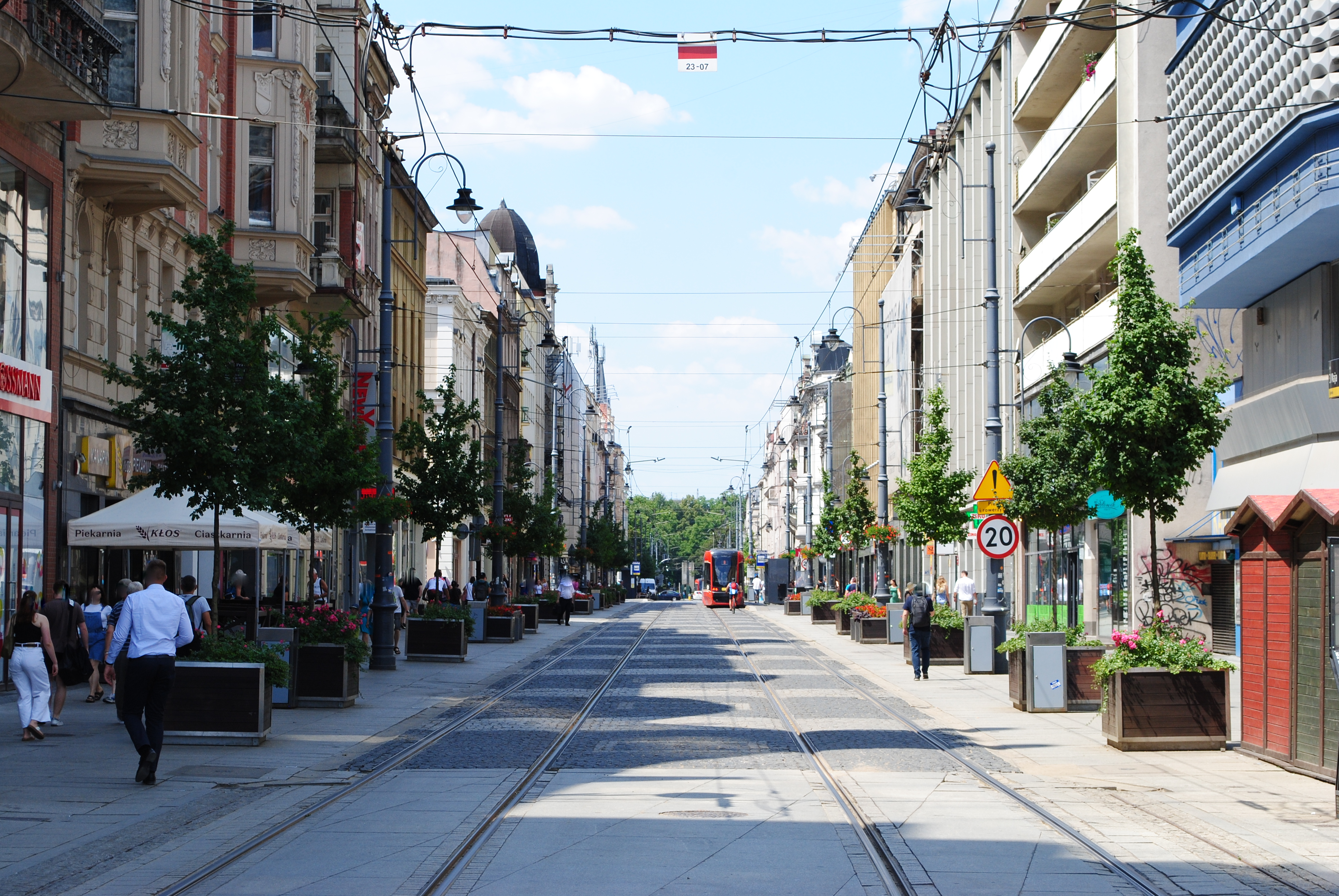
- 3 Maja Street in 2023
- Interactive map of 3 Maja Street
- Former names: Grundmannstraße (1867−1922, 1939−1945); Industriestraße (1856−1867)
- Length: 6.40 km (3.98 mi)
- Location: Śródmieście, Katowice, Silesian Voivodeship, Poland
- East end: Market Square
- West end: Freedom Square

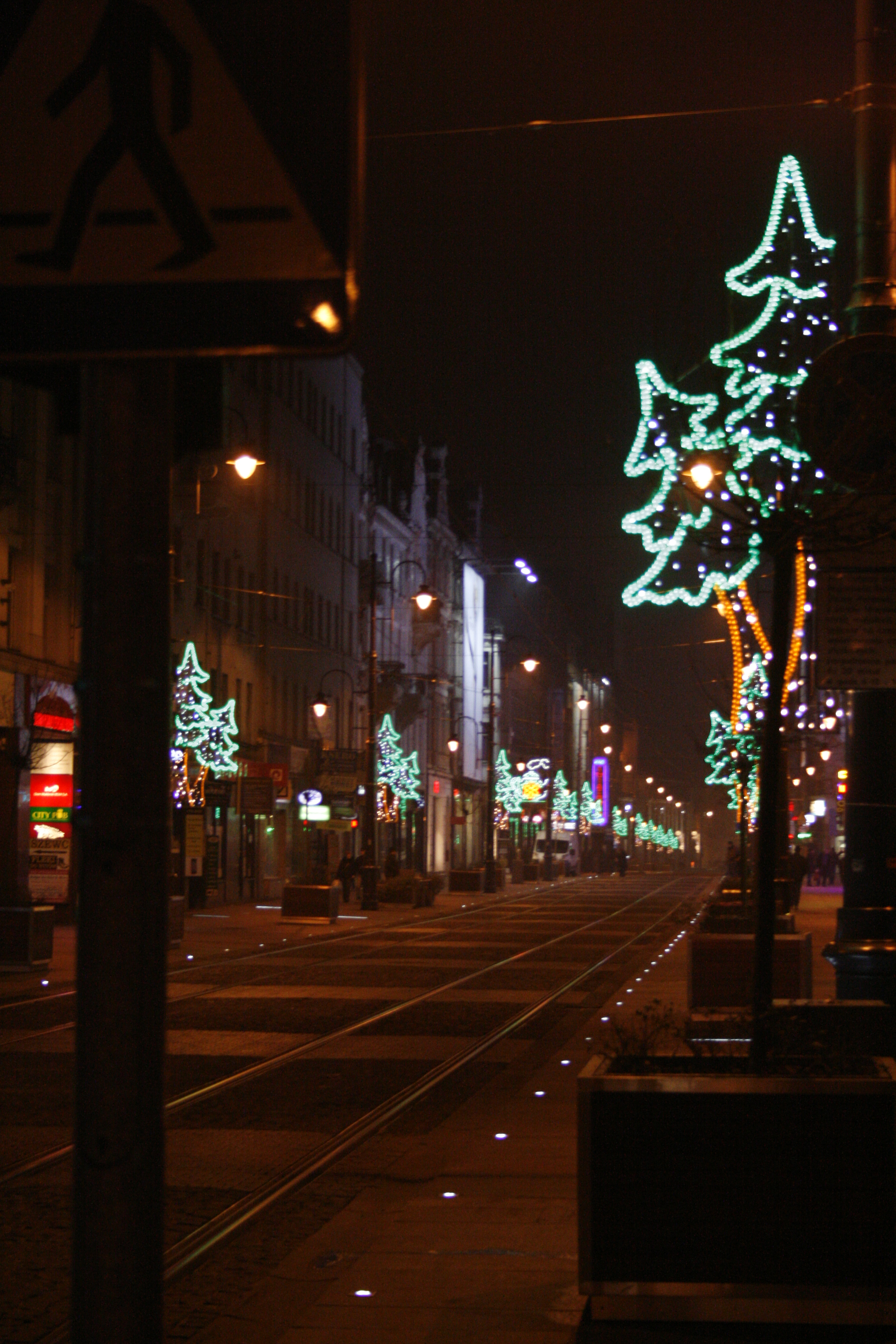
3 Maja Street in Christmas time

3 Maja Street in Katowice (3 May Street) is a street in the centre ('Śródmieście') of Katowice, Poland. The street was built in the 19th century. During World War II the street was called Grundmannstraße, 1867−1922 Grundmannstraße, 1856−1867 Industriestraße.

The street starts at the Market Square in Katowice. It passes through the Wawelska Street, Wilhelm Szewczyk Square, Stawowa Street, and Juliusza Słowackiego Street. The street ends at Wolności Square.

== Buildings ==
- Synagogue
- Old tenement houses
- Cinema "Światowid"
