= Chorzowska Street =

Major street in Katowice, Poland

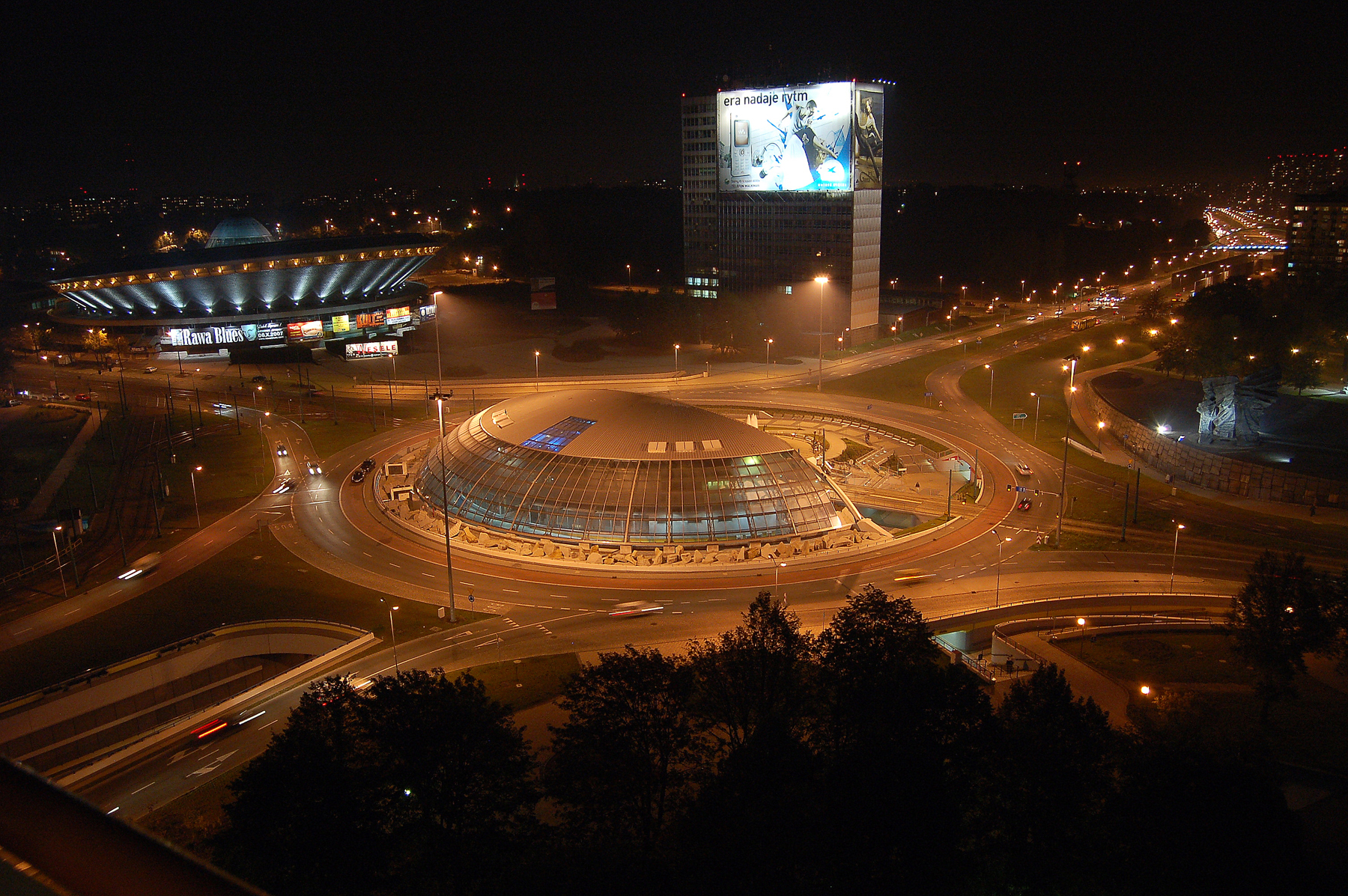
- Start of Chorzowska Street at Jerzy Ziętek Square
- Former name(s): Königshütter Straße (until 1922, 1939–1945); Szosa Królewsko-Hucka (1924–1939)
- Part of: Dąb, Koszutka, Osiedle Tysiąclecia, Śródmieście
- Length: 4,810 m (15,780 ft)
- Location: Katowice, Poland
- Coordinates: 50°16′20.6″N 18°59′29.2″E

Chorzowska Street in Katowice is a key road in the Metropolis GZM, located in the districts of Dąb, Koszutka, Osiedle Tysiąclecia, and Śródmieście. It serves as a direct road link between Katowice's city center and Chorzów, from which it derives its name. The street is part of National Road 79 along its entire length. Tram tracks, in place since 1897, run along the street. Between 2002 and 2007, the section including Walenty Roździeński Avenue, Jerzy Ziętek Square, and Chorzowska Street was redeveloped to accommodate the Central Road Route. The street is lined with high-rise buildings, office complexes, and the Silesia City Center shopping center.

== Route ==
Chorzowska Street begins at Jerzy Ziętek Square (intersection of Wojciech Korfanty Avenue and Walenty Roździeński Avenue). It intersects with Sokolska Street. At the junction with Jan Nepomucen Stęślicki Street and Friedrich Wilhelm Grundmann Street (the so-called "city center bypass", near Alojzy Budniok Park), there is an exit from the tunnel under the roundabout. This includes two tunnels, 672 m and 657 m long, facilitating east–west transit between Chorzowska Street and Walenty Roździeński Avenue. The street continues past Piotr Ściegienny Street, John Baildon Street, and Dębowa Street. Before the intersection with Złota Street and Bracka Street (Atrakcji Square), there is an exit to the Nikodem and Józef Reniec Route.

Further along, Chorzowska Street forms the boundary between Chorzów and Katowice, serving as the northern boundary of Katowice's Osiedle Tysiąclecia and the southern boundary of Chorzów's Silesian Park. It ends at the city border, near a pedestrian path to Silesian Stadium, where it becomes Katowicka Street.

== History ==
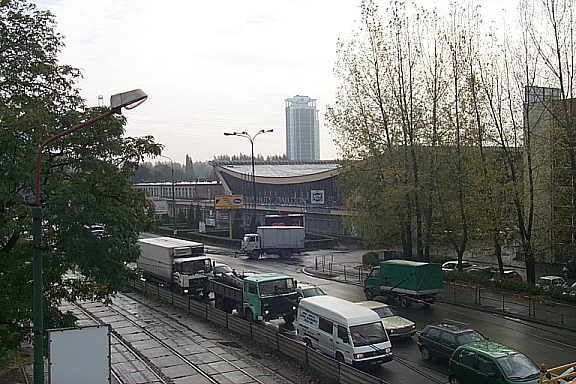
Demolished Baildon Hall

From the late 18th to the mid-19th century, industrial complexes were enclaves in a still-rural landscape. The development of industry led to the regulation of some roads and the creation of new ones, which became significant for the city's future urban framework. Industrial complexes gradually disappeared from the city's map, and within its original cadastral boundaries, no smelters or mines remain today due to urbanization. Industrial functions gave way to those typical of an expanding urban center, where industry management hubs concentrated. Regulated straight sections of early industrial roads and rural paths were incorporated into the urban street network. Two main communication axes – east-west (now Chorzowska Street and further Warszawska Street) and north–south (now Wojciech Korfanty Avenue, Pocztowa Street, and Tadeusz Kościuszko Street) – formed the main urban framework of Śródmieście.

The road from Katowice to Królewska Huta (now Chorzów) was well-established by the first half of the 19th century, routed behind the former pond of the Marta Smelter. On 1 January 1828, a wooden building for the first school in Dąb was opened at 153 Chorzowska Street, expanded in the 1840s and replaced with a new brick building in 1856 at the same location. In 1870, the Kattowitz–Königshütter Chausee-Aktien Verein company improved the road. In 1897, a tram line to Królewska Huta was established, initially served by steam trams, and from 1907 by electric trams to Bytom.

During the Second Silesian Uprising in August 1920, fighting between Polish insurgents and Germans occurred near Dąb along the road to Królewska Huta. The street was named Königshütter Straße until 1922 and from 1939 to 1945, and Szosa Królewsko-Hucka from 1924 to 1939. During the interwar period, a carbide lamp burner factory operated at number 179. Between 1933 and 1934, four residential blocks for the homeless were built at numbers 240, 242, 244, and 246 as part of affordable social housing. At number 153, a post and telegraph office and a police station operated during the interwar period.

During the Polish People's Republic, the street was part of the international road E22a. It was named after Felix Dzerzhinsky. In the late 1960s, a complex of commercial pavilions and residential buildings, designed by Stanisław Kwaśniewicz, was built on the northern side in the Koszutka area. Named after Julian Marchlewski, this estate was part of the city's general urban and architectural reorganization plan.

From 1963 to 2003, the Baildon Hall, with its distinctive 50 cables supporting the roof, stood at the intersection of Żelazna Street and Chorzowska Street. One cable was damaged in 1996, and in April 2003, a private company demolished the hall.

From 1985 to 2000, the street was part of the former national road 914.

Between 2002 and 2007, the section of Walenty Roździeński Avenue, Jerzy Ziętek Square, and Chorzowska Street was redeveloped for the Central Road Route. The Orląt Lwowskich Viaduct, 592 m long and 31.12 m wide in an "S" shape, was built over Bracka Street. It connects Chorzowska Street to the Nikodem and Józef Reniec Route. On 3 August 2010, the street was part of the third stage of the 2010 Tour de Pologne, and on 2 August 2011, the third stage of the 2011 Tour de Pologne.

== Infrastructure ==
Near the central headquarters of ING Bank Śląski, the so-called "Western Gate" marks one of the entrances to the city center, symbolizing the boundary of the downtown area.

A 2007 study for the Katowice City Office found that during the afternoon peak, traffic volume on Chorzowska Street from Piastów Street to Bracka Street was 3,279 vehicles (89.5% passenger cars, 6.4% vans, 2.4% trucks, 1% buses), and near Silesia City Center, 6,245 vehicles (91.8% passenger cars, 3.9% vans, 1.5% trucks, 1.3% buses). Noise levels along Chorzowska Street range from 70.6 dB to 74.3 dB, and near the tram line, from 60.8 dB to 73 dB.

The street includes a northern water main (Dn 800/600 Maczki–Katowice) with a 600 mm diameter, a district heating main (PEC – 2 x Dn 700), and a medium-pressure gas pipeline (Ø 225 mm).

== Buildings and institutions ==
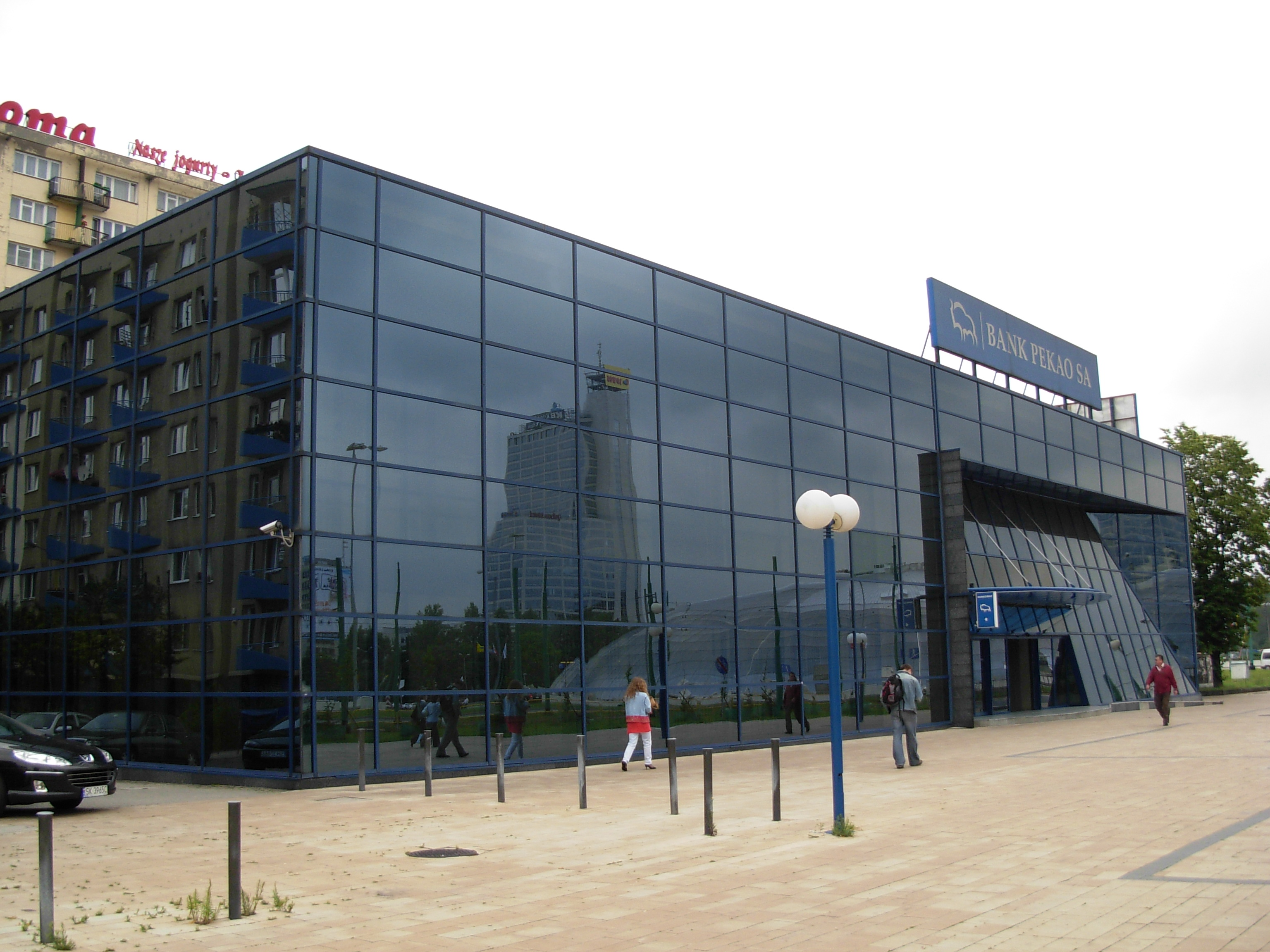
Bank Pekao SA (1 Chorzowska Street)

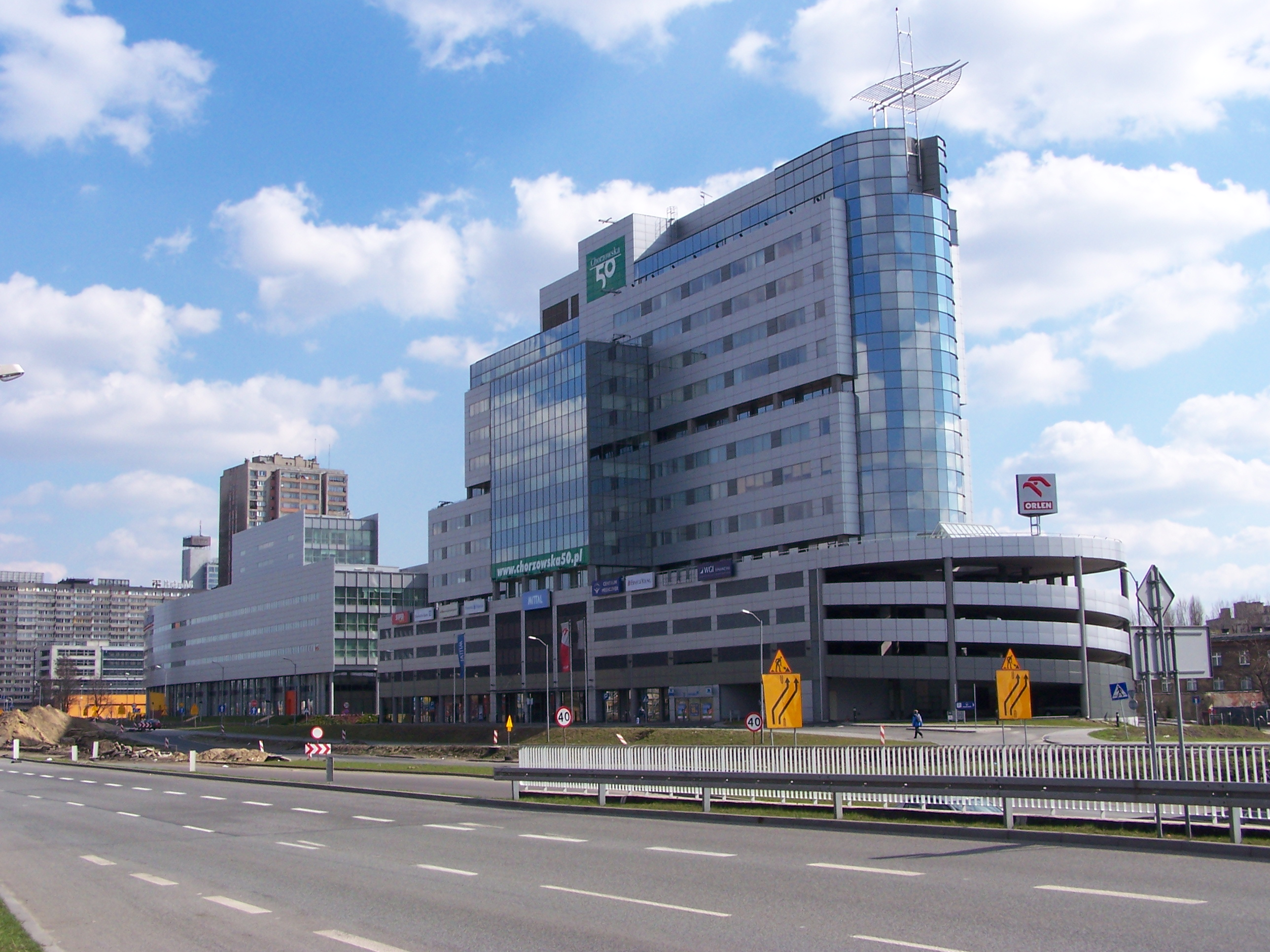
Chorzowska 50 complex

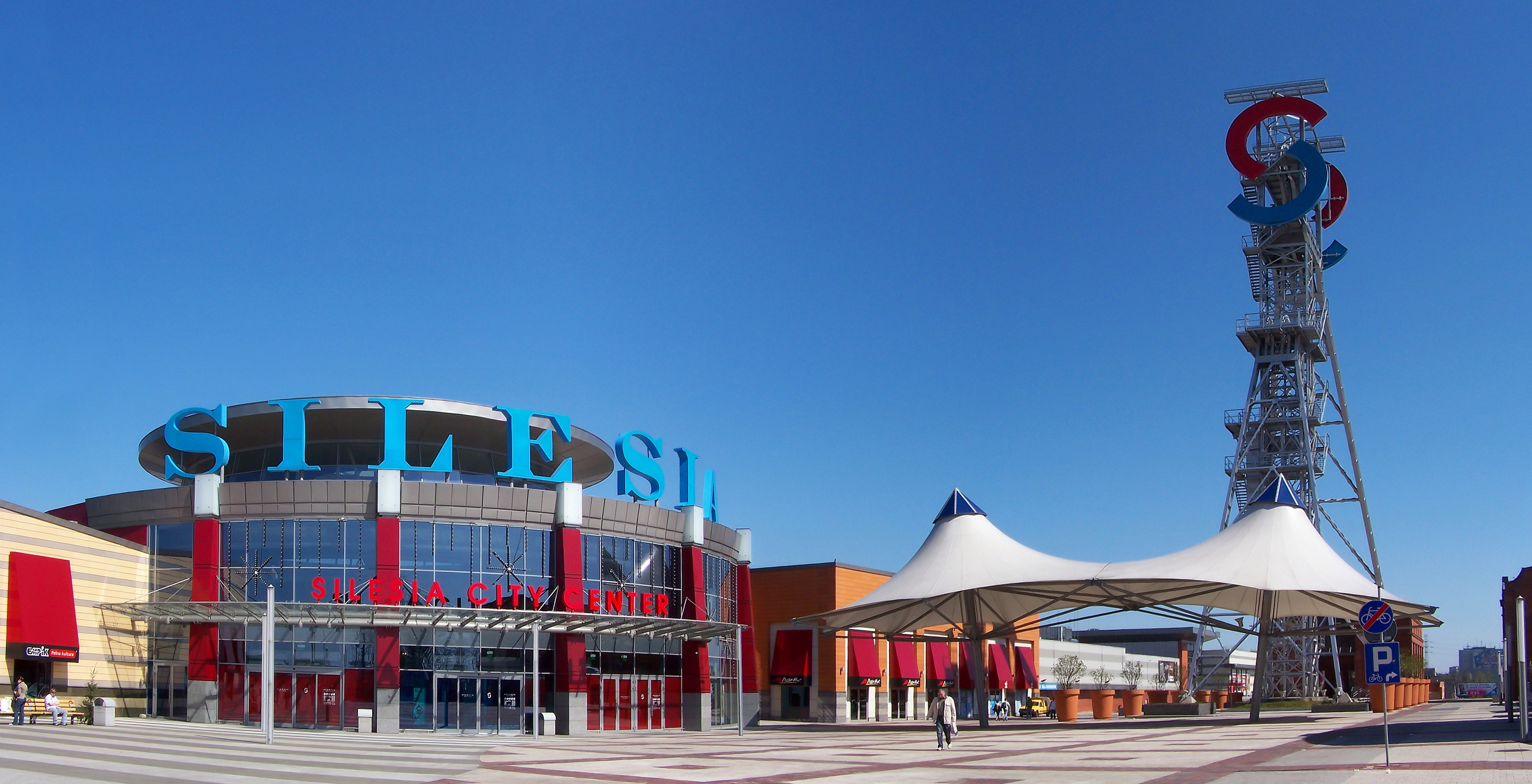
Silesia City Center (107 Chorzowska Street)

The following notable buildings are located along Chorzowska Street:

- Bank Pekao building (1 Chorzowska Street) – built in 1995 to a 1992 design by Gabriel Korbutt and Krzysztof A. Kałużny. It has a usable area of 3,600 m^{2} and a volume of 20,100 m^{3}. The architects received the 1995 Katowice Voivode's First Prize and the SARP "Architecture of the Year 1995" award.
- Chorzowska 50 – a Class A office building at 50 Chorzowska Street, built from 1999 to 2001. It has 13 floors, a height of 68 m, and a total area of 40,300 m^{2}. The building's intensity ratio is 4.15. Considered a city "landmark" by local authorities, its 2.22 ha area was included in the Katowice Special Economic Zone by a 2 November 2006 Council of Ministers regulation.
- Baildon Steelworks complex – located between Chorzowska Street, Friedrich W. Grundmann Street, Żelazna Street, Gliwicka Street, and Feliks Bocheński Street.
- Silesia City Center (107 Chorzowska Street) – a commercial-service complex on the site of the former Gottwald Coal Mine, opened on 18 November 2005. With 65,000 m^{2}, it houses stores like Cinema City Silesia, Empik, Saturn, and Fun-City. The investor was the Hungarian TriGranit Development Corporation, which also developed Dębowe Tarasy.
- Chapel of St. Barbara at Silesia City Center (111 Chorzowska Street) – consecrated in 2005, housed in a building that once contained a hoisting machine for the Kleofas Coal Mine. It is a branch of the Parish of St. John and Paul Martyrs in Dąb.
- Former Kleofas Coal Mine buildings at Silesia City Center (109 Chorzowska Street): the former administration building and the Jerzy shaft hoisting tower, both under conservation protection.
- Katowice Business Point (corner of Chorzowska Street and Piotr Ściegienny Street) – an office and conference building with commercial-service functions, built from 2008 to 2010. It has 11 above-ground and 3 underground floors, 17,200 m^{2} of usable area, and 200 parking spaces. Designed by Jaspers Eyers & Partners (Belgium) and Konior & Partners (Poland).
- Craft (105 Chorzowska Street) – an office building constructed from 2020 to 2023, 55 m tall, consisting of three perpendicular structures clad in copper-toned elements. The investor was Ghelamco Poland.
- Former Baildon Smelter administrative building (112 Chorzowska Street), built in the early 20th century in the historicism style, and a water tower (near number 112), also from the early 20th century.
- Church of St. John and Paul Martyrs complex (160 Chorzowska Street), listed in the Registry of Cultural Property on 20 April 2004 (no. A/115/04). The complex includes the church (built in 1873, rebuilt between 1901 and 1902 per Ludwig Schneider's design), a sculptural group "Crucifixion" from the early 20th century, a rectory (built between 1897 and 1899), and a church cemetery (within the fenced plot).
- Historic tenement in a garden (186 Chorzowska Street), built in the International Style, under conservation protection.
- Historic water pumping station and reservoir of the Upper Silesian Waterworks (186a Chorzowska Street), built in the historicism style, under conservation protection.
- Villa in a garden (188 Chorzowska Street), built in the late 1920s to early 1930s.
- Historic tenements in gardens (200 and 202 Chorzowska Street), built in the late 19th century in the brick historicism style, under conservation protection.

Other institutions along Chorzowska Street include: commercial and service businesses, shops, the Człowiek dla Człowieka Foundation, the Kpda Foundation for Accounting Development, medical warehouses, branches of Post Office No. 1, and housing associations.
