= Wojciech Korfanty Avenue, Katowice =

Street in Katowice, Poland

Wojciech Korfanty Avenue
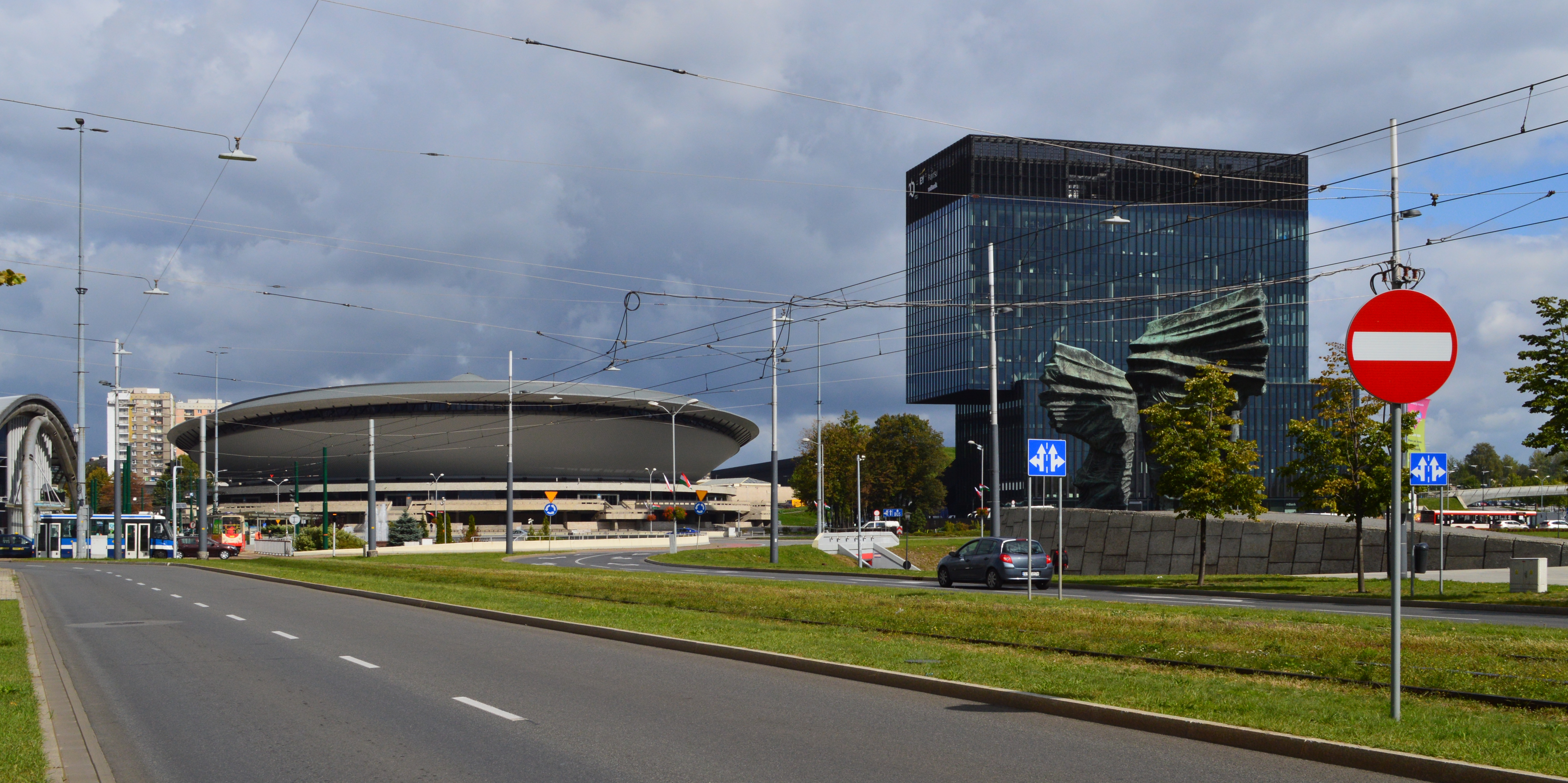
- Wojciech Korfanty Avenue in Śródmieście, Katowice; in the background, Jerzy Ziętek Square, the Spodek arena, the KTW skyscraper, and the Monument of Silesian Insurgents

- Location within Poland
- Part of: Koszutka, Śródmieście, Wełnowiec-Józefowiec
- Length: 3,885 m (12,746 ft)
- Location: Katowice, Poland
- Coordinates: 50°16′40.2″N 19°01′17.0″E

Wojciech Korfanty Avenue in Katowice is a major arterial road running from the city center northward through the districts of Koszutka and Wełnowiec-Józefowiec, eventually leading to the neighboring city of Siemianowice Śląskie. Along the avenue, there are numerous public utility buildings and residential structures from various periods, particularly from the post-war era. The avenue is named after Wojciech Korfanty, a prominent figure in the history of Upper Silesia.

== Route ==
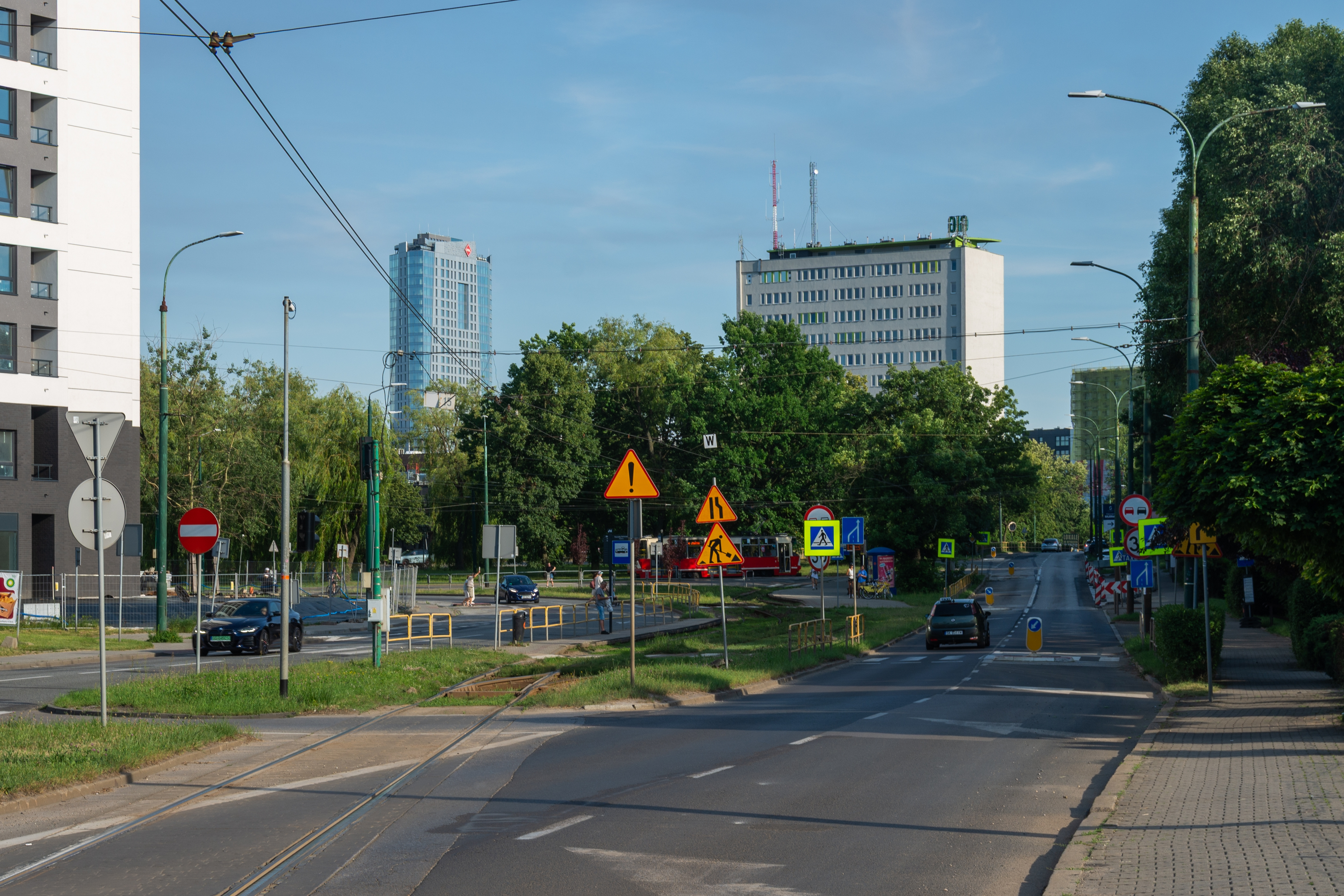
Wojciech Korfanty Avenue at the intersection with Słoneczna Street

Wojciech Korfanty Avenue begins in the Śródmieście district of Katowice at the Market Square and its intersection with Teatralna Street. Heading north, it crosses Stanisław Moniuszko and Piastowska streets, passing notable landmarks such as the former Grand Hotel (No. 3), the Separator building, Hotel Katowice, the Ślizgowiec, and the Superjednostka residential building. Nearby stands the Monument of Silesian Insurgents.

At the Jerzy Ziętek Square, the avenue intersects with Walenty Roździeński Avenue (forming part of National Roads 79 and 86, Expressway S86, and Drogowa Trasa Średnicowa) and Chorzowska Street (National Road 79, Drogowa Trasa Średnicowa). The road then enters the Koszutka district, flanked by the KTW high-rises, Spodek arena, and the Central Mining Institute near Gwarków Square, crossing Misjonarzy Oblatów MN and Katowicka streets.

Continuing northward, it enters the Wełnowiec-Józefowiec district near the intersection with Słoneczna and Jesionowa streets. In Wełnowiec, it crosses Konduktorska and Gnieźnieńska streets (Walenty Fojkis Square), passing by the historic building of the Court of Appeal and the site of the former Hohenlohe steelworks, followed by the Fryderyk colony. The road ends at the intersection with Telewizyjna Street next to Alfred Square, the Alfred Colony, and Alfred Forest, at the city border with Siemianowice Śląskie.

== History ==
Buildings of Kuźnica Bogucka in 1823, along the estate road (today's Wojciech Korfanty Avenue)

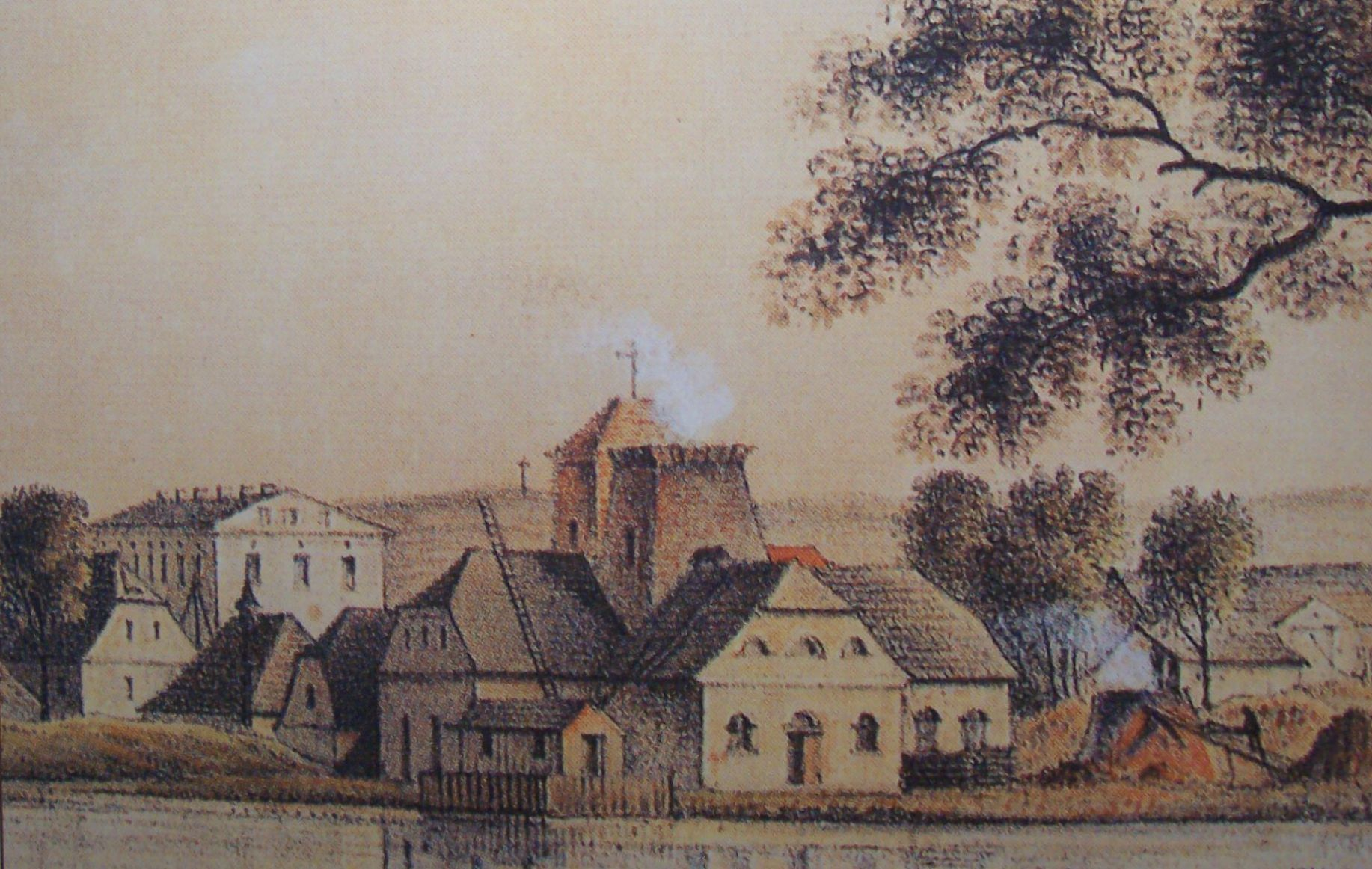
Kuźnica Bogucka in a lithograph by Ernest Knippel from around 1830

Around 1360, a forge was established by the Roździanka river (today's Rawa river, covered with concrete slabs and flowing under the avenue near the Market Square) at the site of today's Separator building in the former Kuźnica Bogucka (present-day Śródmieście). The first written mention of the forge at this location dates back to 1397, in the text of a verdict from the Kraków diocesan court resolving a dispute over the patronage of the Mysłowice parish. The forge's buildings survived until the second half of the 19th century.

The road to Siemianowice already existed in the 17th century as an estate road. At the turn of the 17th and 18th centuries, in the area of today's Piastowska and Uniwersytecka streets, and Wojciech Korfanty Avenue, there was a metallurgical farmstead (owned from the second half of the 18th century by the proprietors of Kuźnica Bogucka).

In 1818, in the area of today's Spodek, on land belonging to Franz von Winckler, the "Franz" steelworks was established. In 1860, it merged with the "Fanny" steelworks to form the combined "Fanny-Franz" works, which operated until 1903. Its buildings were repurposed for the construction of the so-called Maria Manor – a factory complex with a metallurgical character – owned by the Kurtok family. It was demolished in the 1960s.

From 1899 to 1922, the street was known as Schloßstrasse, from 1922 to 1939 and in 1945 as Zamkowa Street, from 1939 to 1945 as Ludendorffstraße, and since 11 October 1946 as Red Army Street. On 8 October 1990, a resolution by the Katowice City Council renamed it Wojciech Korfanty Avenue. From its inception, the street has hosted public utility buildings.

During the interwar period of the 20th century, the then Zamkowa Street was home to: Consulate of the Republic of Latvia (at number 16), Zamkowa Restaurant run by Franciszek Matula (at number 1), Adelista Dawid's dining hall (at number 2), Śląski Przemysł Rowerowy ( at number 20), "Polhurt" Industrial and Commercial Association (at number 20), "Steinhoff" chemical factory (at number 20), "Progress" United Upper Silesian Mines (coal sales office, at number 10), H. Schwidewski's gasoline, oil, and grease store (at numbers 37 and 38), Branch of Śląski Kupiecki Bank and "Przyszłość" insurance company (at number 1). At the site of today's Jerzy Ziętek Square, there used to be a railway crossing for a narrow-gauge railway leading to the "Ferdynand" mine.

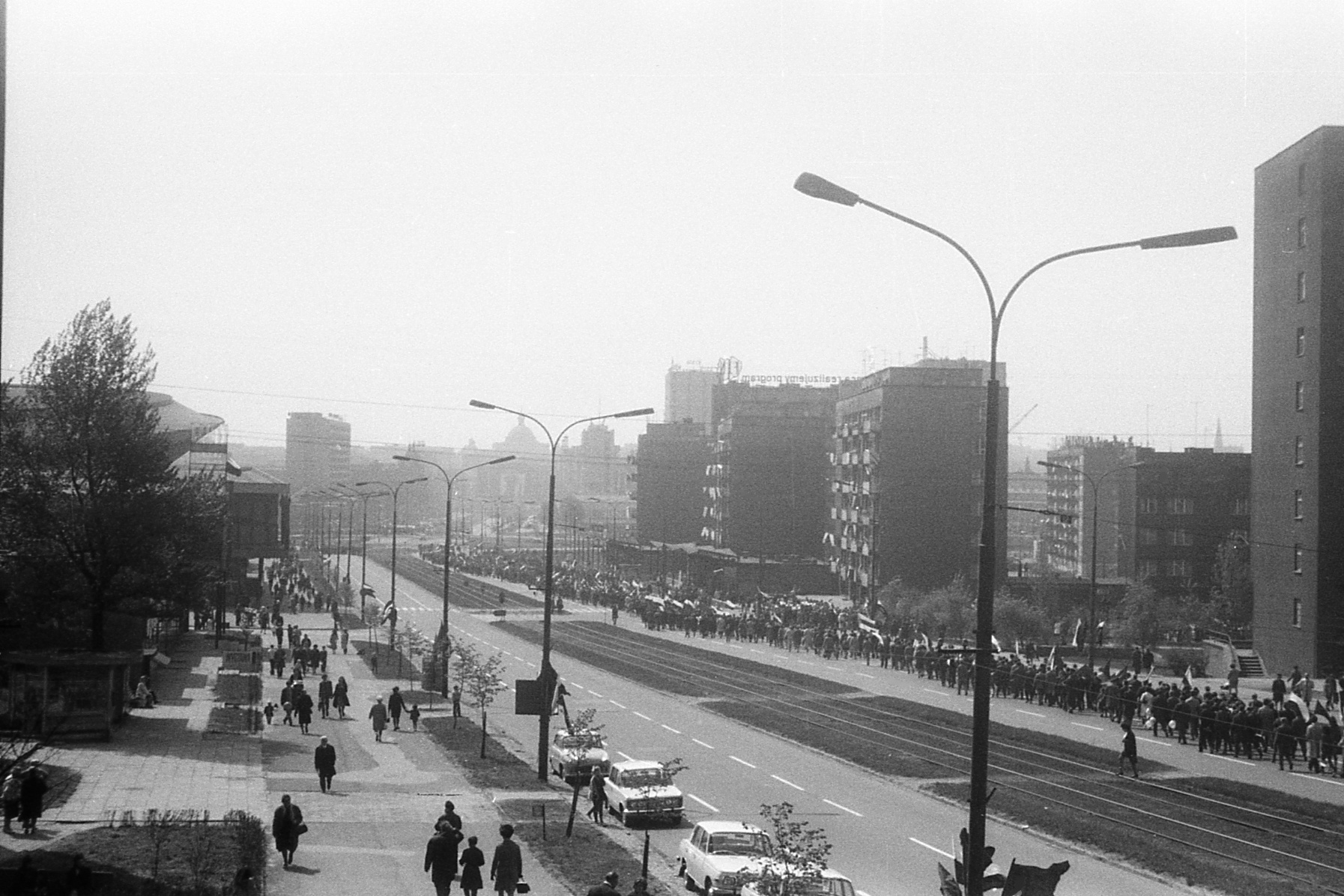
May Day parade along the former Red Army Street at the height of Koszutka in 1971/1972

On 4 September 1939, across from the House of the Insurgent, on what was then Zamkowa Street, Wehrmacht soldiers executed captured Polish defenders of the city – around 80 scouts and former Silesian insurgents, including Nikodem Renc. In 1945, a branch of the "Papyrus" company from Kraków was opened at number 38.

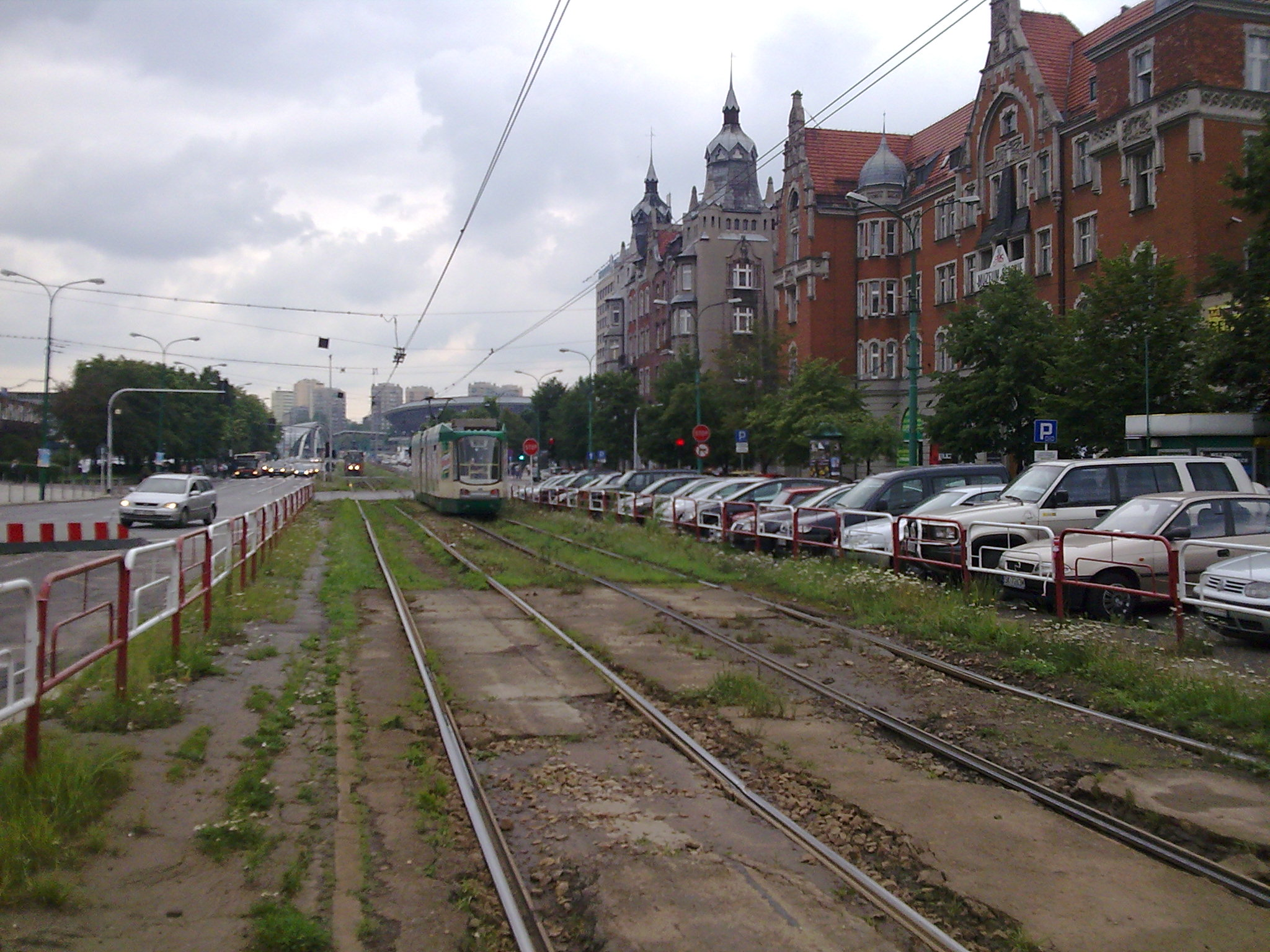
Wojciech Korfanty Avenue at the height of building no. 1 in July 2008 (before renovation)

In 1959, Katowice authorities decided to redevelop the city center, including the Market Square. The northern row of tenements was demolished to widen Red Army Street and initiate the expansion of the city center to the north, which until then had been occupied by the former buildings of the "Marta" steelworks and the von Thiele-Winckler palace. Plans for the street widening began as early as 1938, with the demolition of buildings at numbers 4 and 5. During the 1960s, the so-called Block Zachód was constructed, a series of galleries and service-commercial buildings. The project also involved building high-rises: Separator (1968), Ślizgowiec (1968), and Superjednostka (1967–1972). In 1965, a roundabout at the intersection of Feliks Dzierżyński Street (now Chorzowska Street) and Walenty Roździeński Avenue was built, featuring underground pedestrian passages designed by W. Lipowczan.

On 9 December 2006, a renovated roundabout with a glass dome and an underground tunnel, approximately 650 meters long, was opened. On 3 August 2010, the third stage of the 2010 Tour de Pologne passed through the avenue, and on 2 August 2011, the third stage of the 2011 Tour de Pologne also went through this route. In the following years, cyclists also passed through this avenue.

Later, the avenue was redeveloped from the Market Square to the Jerzy Ziętek Square. On 18 May 2011, administrative proceedings were initiated to issue a decision for a road investment project named "Reconstruction of the road system, public squares, tram tracks, and technical infrastructure in the Rondo–Rynek area for the project Reconstruction of the city center of Katowice". The construction work was completed by 2015. As part of this project, the tram tracks, roadway, and technical infrastructure from the Market Square to the roundabout were reconstructed, sidewalks were resurfaced, and new bus shelters were installed.

== Description and technical data ==
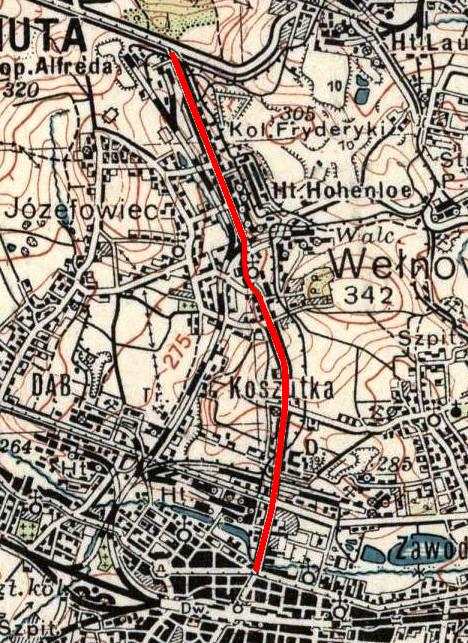
Avenue marked with a red line on the map from 1933

Wojciech Korfanty Avenue runs through three districts: Śródmieście, Koszutka, and Wełnowiec-Józefowiec. It is one of the longest roads in Katowice, with a length of 3,885 meters. It is classified as a county road of the collector road class and is managed by the Municipal Road and Bridge Authority in Katowice. In the TERYT system, it is listed under the number 38509.

From the Market Square to the intersection with Jesionowa and Słoneczna streets, the road has two lanes in each direction and an additional side lane for buses. At its widest point, the roadway measures 15 meters, and the sidewalk is 9.5 meters. At its narrowest, they are 7 meters and 1.5 meters, respectively. Beneath the avenue runs a branch of the main water supply pipeline GPW with a diameter of 600 mm, operated by Katowickie Wodociągi. The historical Upper Silesian Mining Trail runs along the edge of the avenue.

Wojciech Korfanty Avenue is one of the roads in Katowice where the highest number of collisions and accidents occur. According to studies conducted in September 2007, the average traffic volume during the afternoon peak hour on the section of the avenue from Piastowska Street to Jerzy Ziętek Square was 1,702 vehicles per hour, of which 92.9% were passenger cars.

Buses and trams run along the entire length of Wojciech Korfanty Avenue under the Metropolitan Transport Authority and the Municipal Transport Company in Jaworzno. The following stops are located along the avenue: Katowice Aleja Korfantego, Katowice Rondo, Koszutka Misjonarzy Oblatów, Koszutka GIG, Koszutka Słoneczna, Koszutka Jesionowa, Wełnowiec Poczta, Wełnowiec Kościół, Wełnowiec Gnieźnieńska, and Wełnowiec Plac Alfreda. Tram loops are located at the intersections with Słoneczna Street and Telewizyjna Street; the first was opened on 5 September 1964, and the second at its current location in 1956.

== Historical buildings ==
The following structures were built along Wojciech Korfanty Avenue:

- Complex of residential tenements enclosed in a quadrangle between Stanisław Moniuszko Street, Piastowska Street, and Wojciech Korfanty Avenue – erected around 1900 in an eclectic style with elements hinting at Art Nouveau, it is listed in the register of historic monuments.
- Separator (2 Wojciech Korfanty Avenue) – an eleven-story building constructed between 1967 and 1972, originally housing the Main Bureau of Coal Processing Studies and Projects. It was designed by Stanisław Kwaśniewicz and has a volume of 53,000 m^{3}.
- Former Grand Hotel building (3 Wojciech Korfanty Avenue) – served as the Silesian Museum headquarters from 1984 to 2018. Built in 1898 in a Neo-Gothic style, it was likely designed by Ignatz Grünfeld or Gerd Zimmermann.
- "Delikatesy" residential-commercial building (5 Wojciech Korfanty Avenue) – consists of a single-story commercial pavilion and a high-rise residential building, was constructed between 1960 and 1962 and designed by Marian Skałkowski.
- Gallery of Contemporary Art (6 Wojciech Korfanty Avenue) – an 800 m^{2} pavilion opened in 1969. Designed by Stanisław Kwaśniewicz, its upper frieze features sculptures inspired by antique forms.
- Ślizgowiec (8 Wojciech Korfanty Avenue) – a nineteen-story residential high-rise completed in 1969, approximately 60 meters tall, built using a sliding method. The design was by Stanisław Kwaśniewicz.
- Hotel Katowice building (9 Wojciech Korfanty Avenue) – opened in 1965. Designed by Tadeusz Eugeniusz Łobos, it has a volume of 53,460 m^{3} and around 200 single rooms. It was built on the site of the former Katowice estate farm.
- Commercial Children's Facility – Varietes Centrum (10 Wojciech Korfanty Avenue), demolished in 2013.
- Wedding Palace (14 Wojciech Korfanty Avenue) – opened in 1969 and designed by Mieczysław Król. It replaced the buildings of the "Marta" steelworks, demolished in the early 1960s. The palace itself was demolished in 2011.
- Superjednostka (16–32 Wojciech Korfanty Avenue) – one of the largest residential buildings in Poland, built between 1967 and 1972 according to Mieczysław Król's design. It has a volume of 164,000 m^{3}, a residential area of 33,600 m^{2}, and 762 apartments.
- Spodek (35 Wojciech Korfanty Avenue) – built between 1964 and 1971, this iconic multi-purpose hall was designed by the Bureau of Studies and Design of Industrial Construction in Warsaw, led by architects Maciej Gintowt and Maciej Krasiński. Andrzej Żórawski was the contractor for the structure. With a volume of 246,624 m^{3} and a usable area of 15,386 m^{2}, Spodek has 7,776 fixed seats. The total cost of construction was 800 million PLN. Until 1997, it was known as the Provincial Sports and Entertainment Hall in Katowice.
- Residential tenements (58, 68 Wojciech Korfanty Avenue) – built in 1936 in the functionalist style.
- Residential tenement (60 Wojciech Korfanty Avenue) – built in 1937 in the functionalist style.
- Residential tenements (66, 70, 72, 74, 76 Wojciech Korfanty Avenue) – built in the late 1930s in the functionalist style.
- Villa in a garden (71 Wojciech Korfanty Avenue) – built in the 1930s in the functionalist style.
- Residential tenements (80, 84 Wojciech Korfanty Avenue) – built in the late 1940s in the functionalist style.
- Residential buildings (111/113, 115 Wojciech Korfanty Avenue) – built in the early 20th century.
- Neoclassical building of the Court of Appeal (117, 119 Wojciech Korfanty Avenue) – built around 1905, this building, formerly the headquarters of the Hohenlohe Werke concern, is listed in the register of monuments. The protection includes the building and its staircase.
- Heritage residential buildings (118, 120, 124/126, 128, 123, 125, 127, 131, 133, 134/136 Wojciech Korfanty Avenue) – various residential buildings dating from the late 19th and early 20th centuries.
- Church of Our Lady Help of Christians (121/1 Wojciech Korfanty Avenue) – built in 1930 and consecrated on 4 October 1970 by Bishop Czesław Domin.
- Parsonage (121 Wojciech Korfanty Avenue) – built in the first half of the 19th century in Neo-Classical style, originally serving as the administrative building for the Hohenlohe steelworks.
- Fryderyk's Colony residential complex (147/145, 151/149, 153/155, 157/159, 161/163, 165/167, 181/183, 185/187, 189 Wojciech Korfanty Avenue) – residential buildings dating back to the 19th century.
- Former distillation furnace hall at the "Silesia" Metallurgical Works (141 Wojciech Korfanty Avenue, corner of Konduktorska Street) – built in 1913 in a modernist style. It was entered into the register of historic monuments in 1989. However, the building was delisted from the register and demolished following a decision by the Minister of Culture on 4 April 2005.
- Alfred mine shaft buildings (182, 184 Wojciech Korfanty Avenue) – a set of historic buildings from 1910 related to the Alfred mine, listed in the register of monuments since 1978. These buildings include the locomotive shed, workshops, and other related infrastructure, built in both historical and modernist styles.
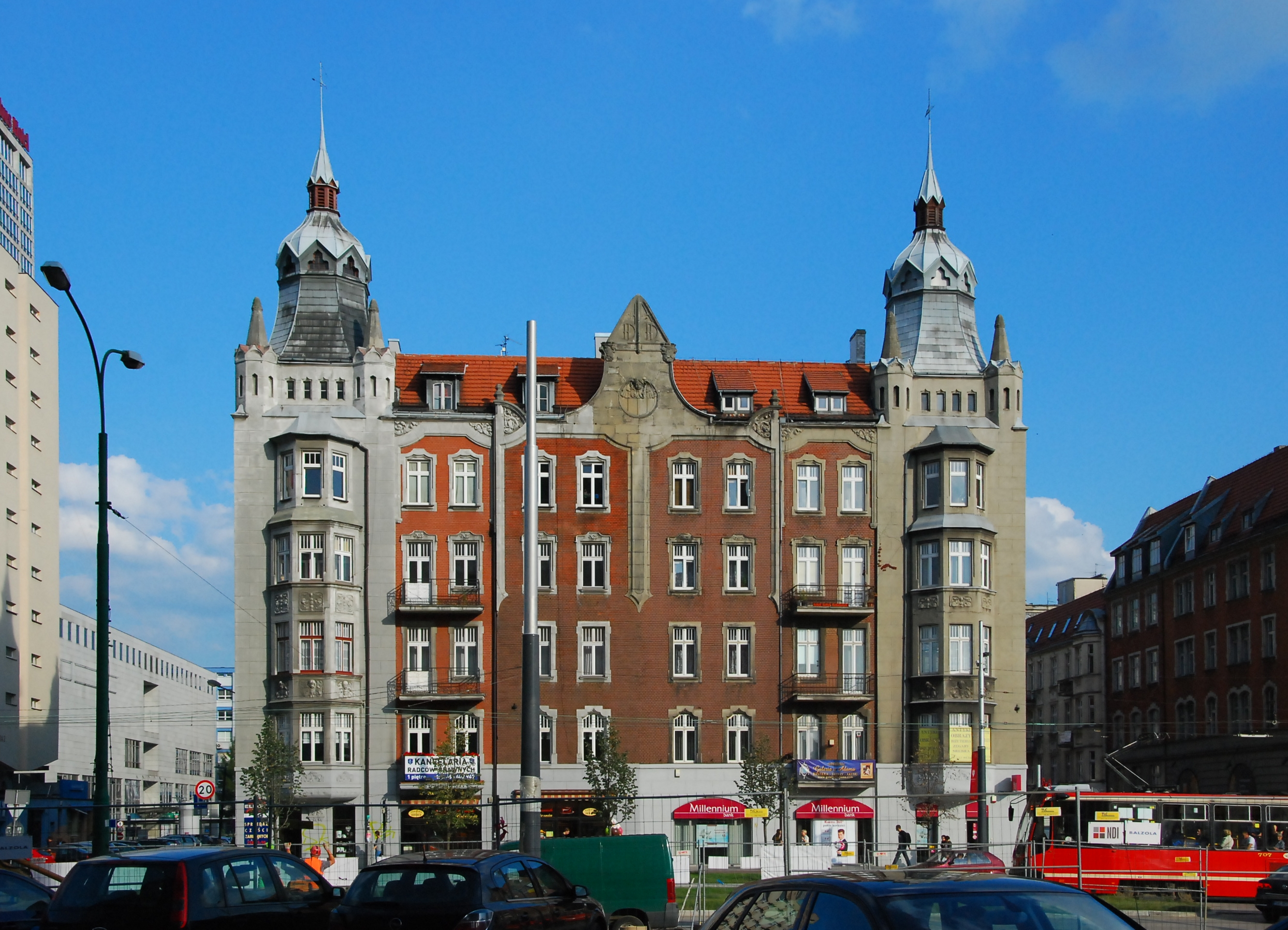
Tenements in the block bounded by Piastowska and S. Moniuszko streets and W. Korfanty Avenue

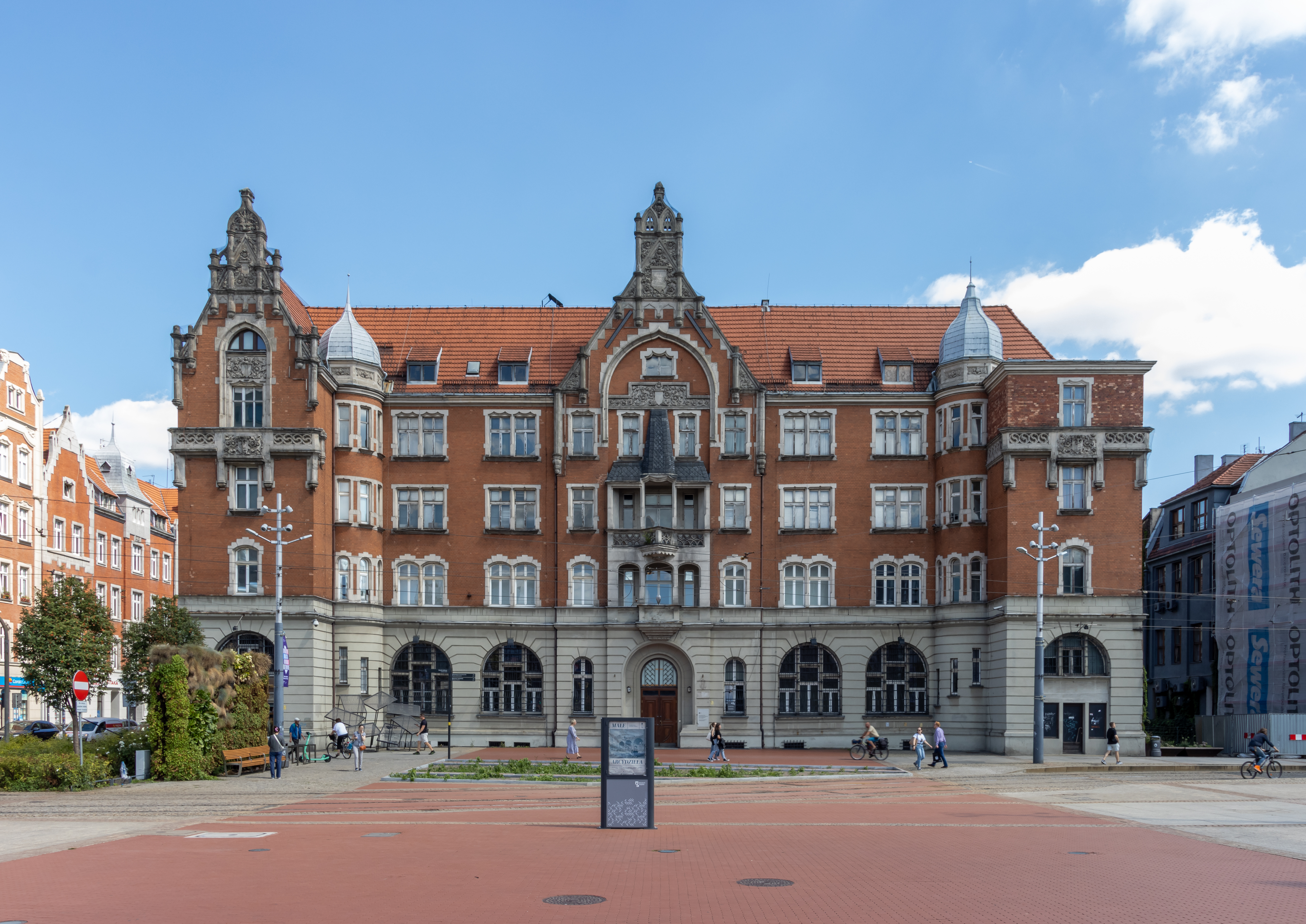
Building of the former Grand Hotel (3 W. Konrfanty Avenue)

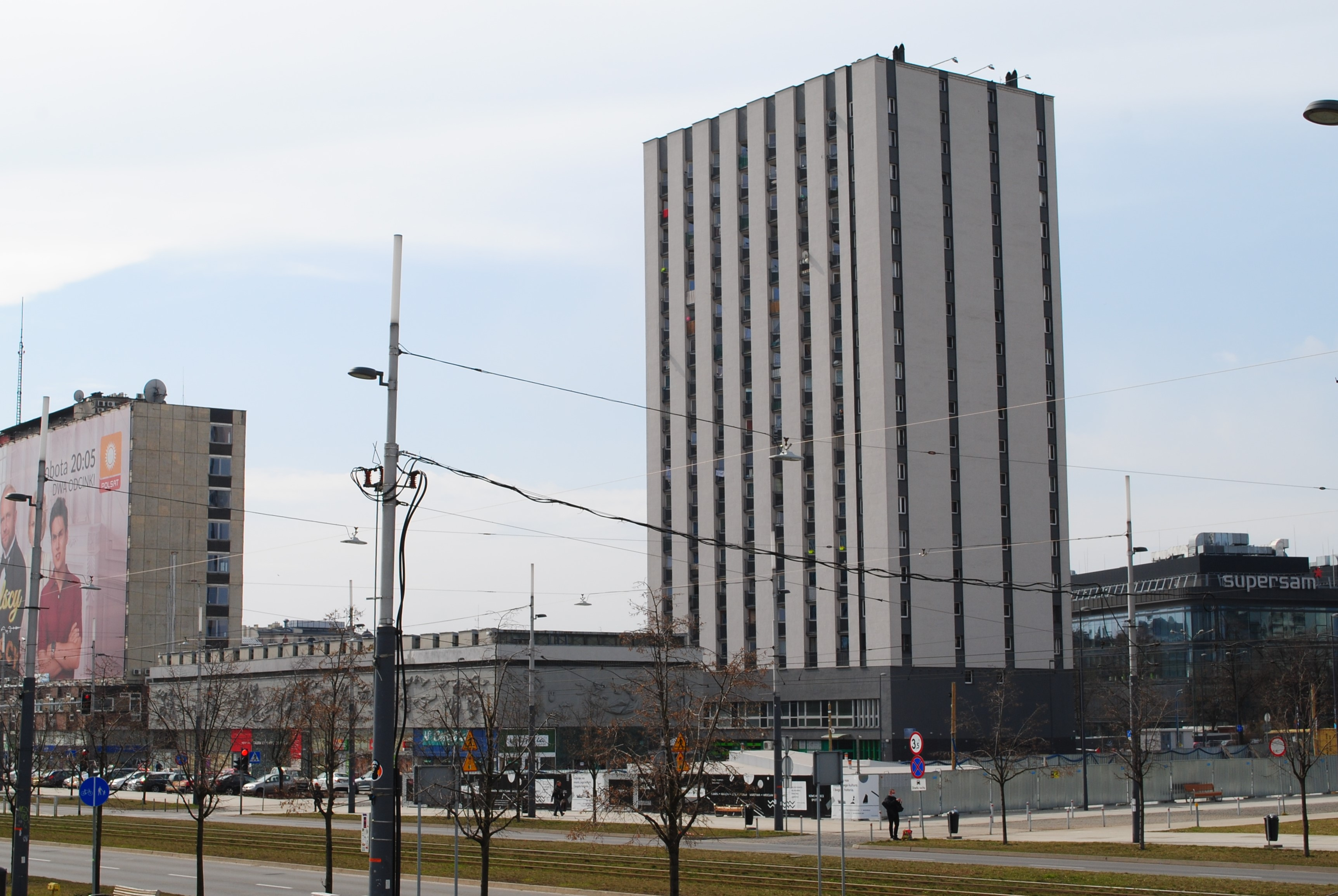
Gallery of Contemporary Art and Ślizgowiec (6 and 8 W. Korfanty Avenue)

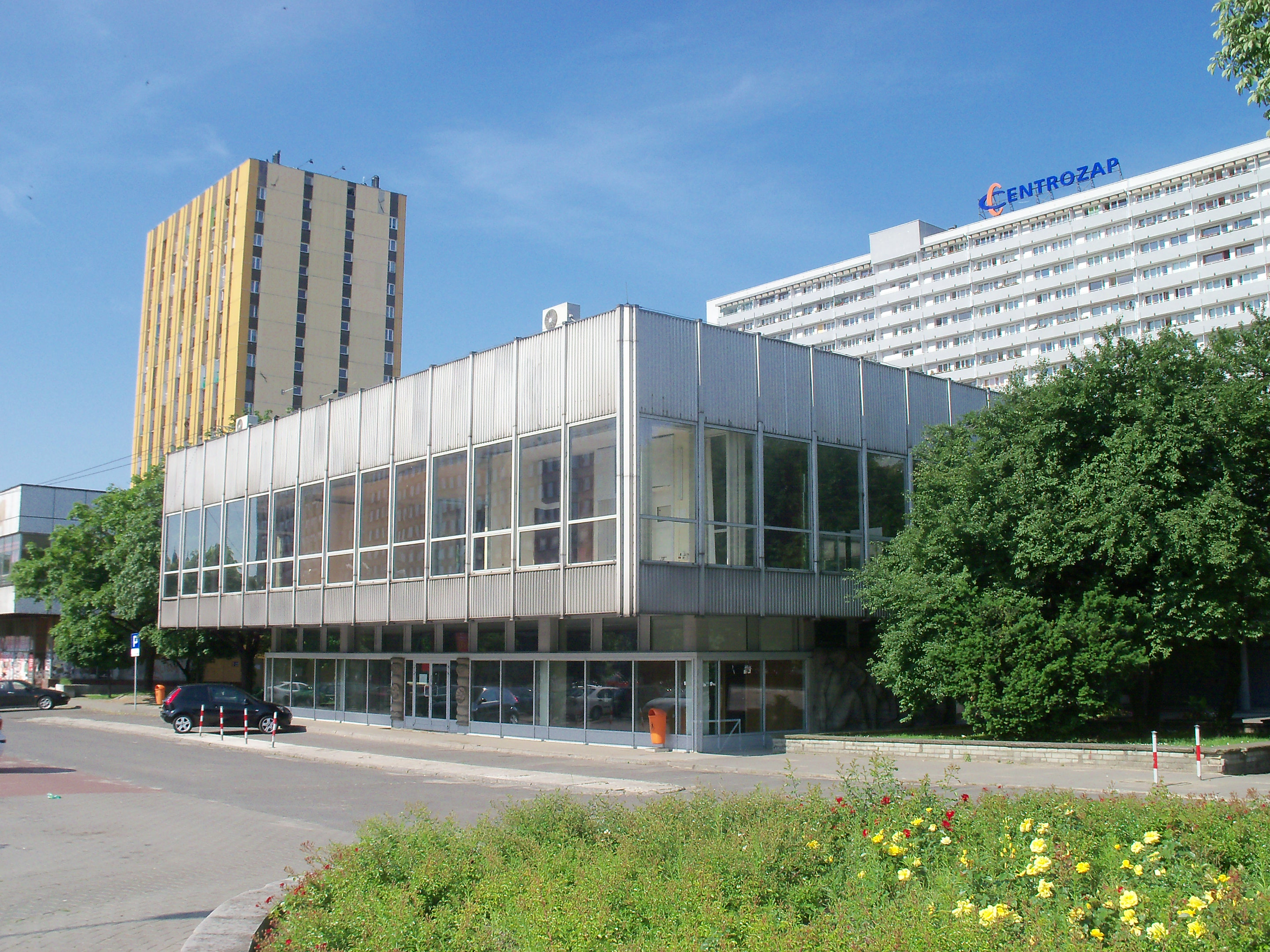
Former Wedding Palace (14 W. Korfanty Avenue)

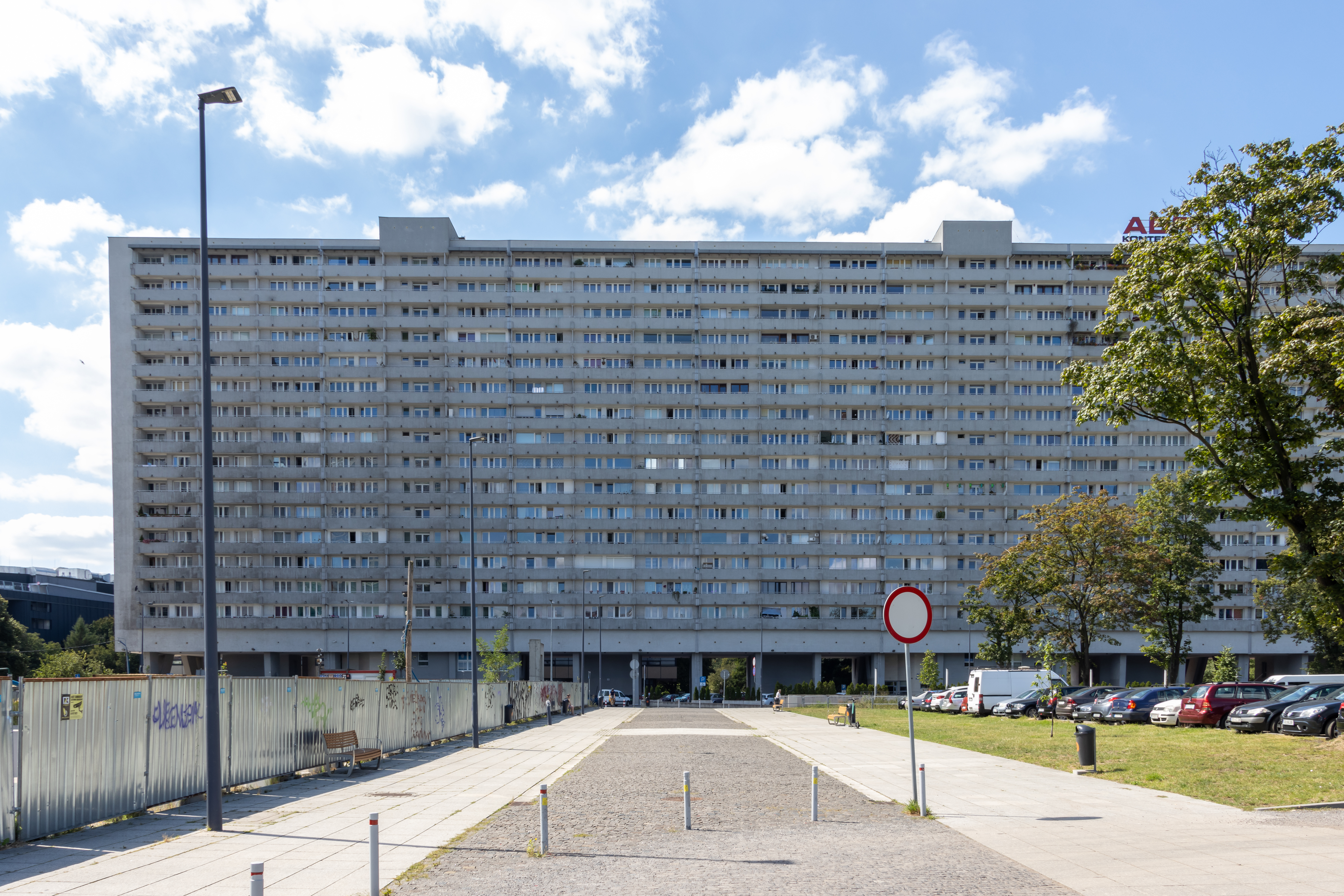
Superjednostka (16–32 W. Korfanty Avenue)

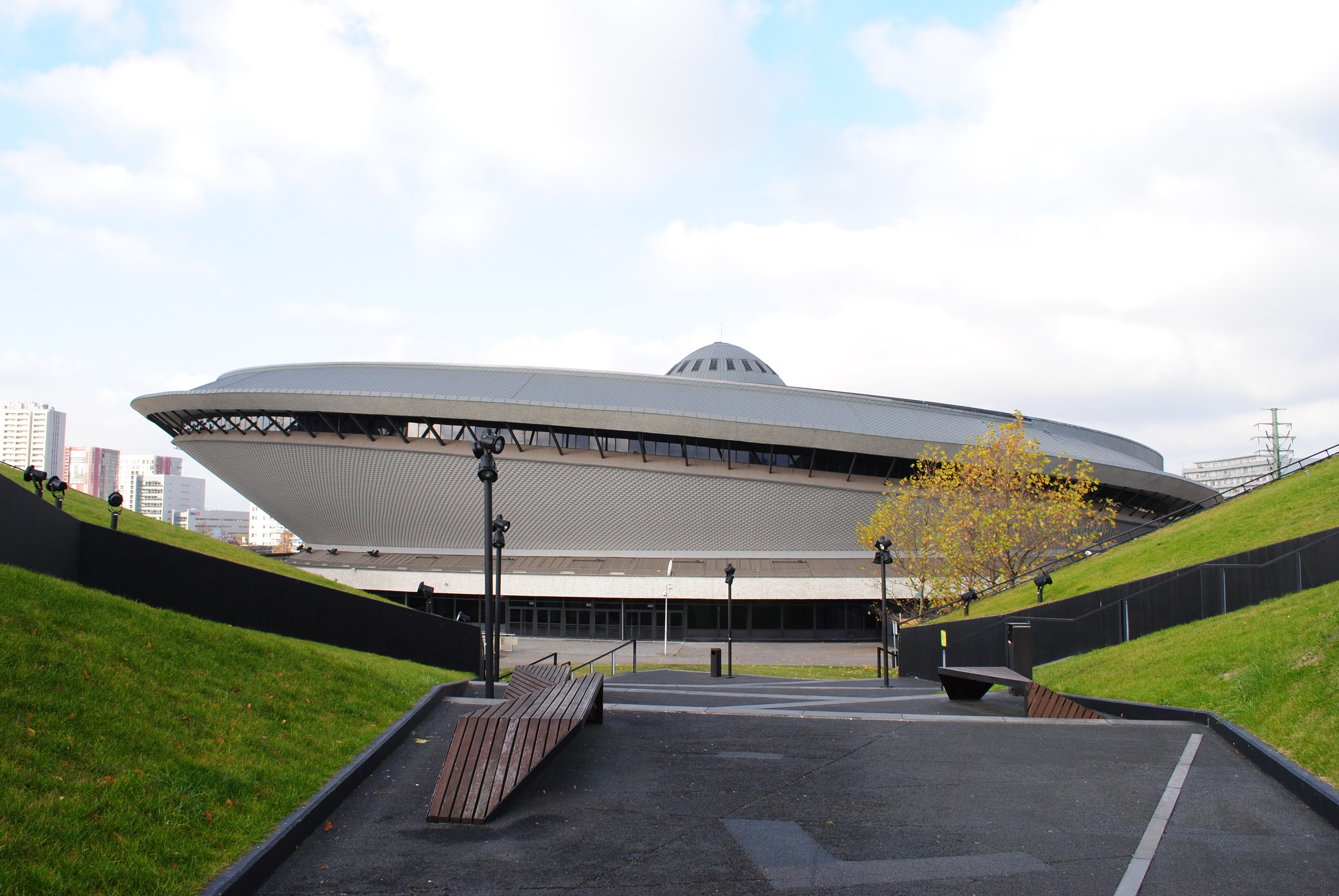
Spodek arena (35 W. Korfanty Avenue)

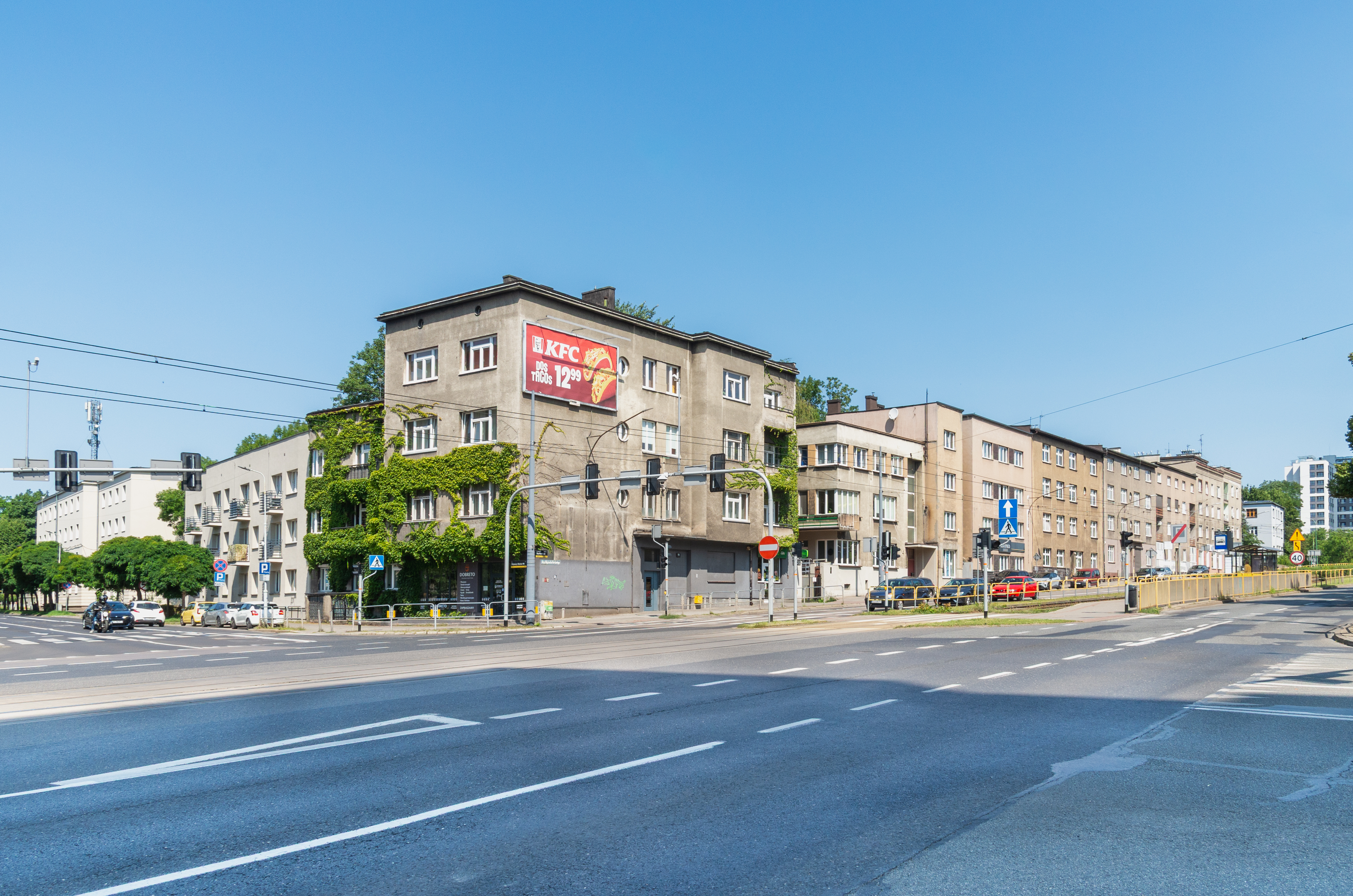
Residential tenements from the 1930s (66, 70, 72, 74, and 76 W. Korfanty Avenue)

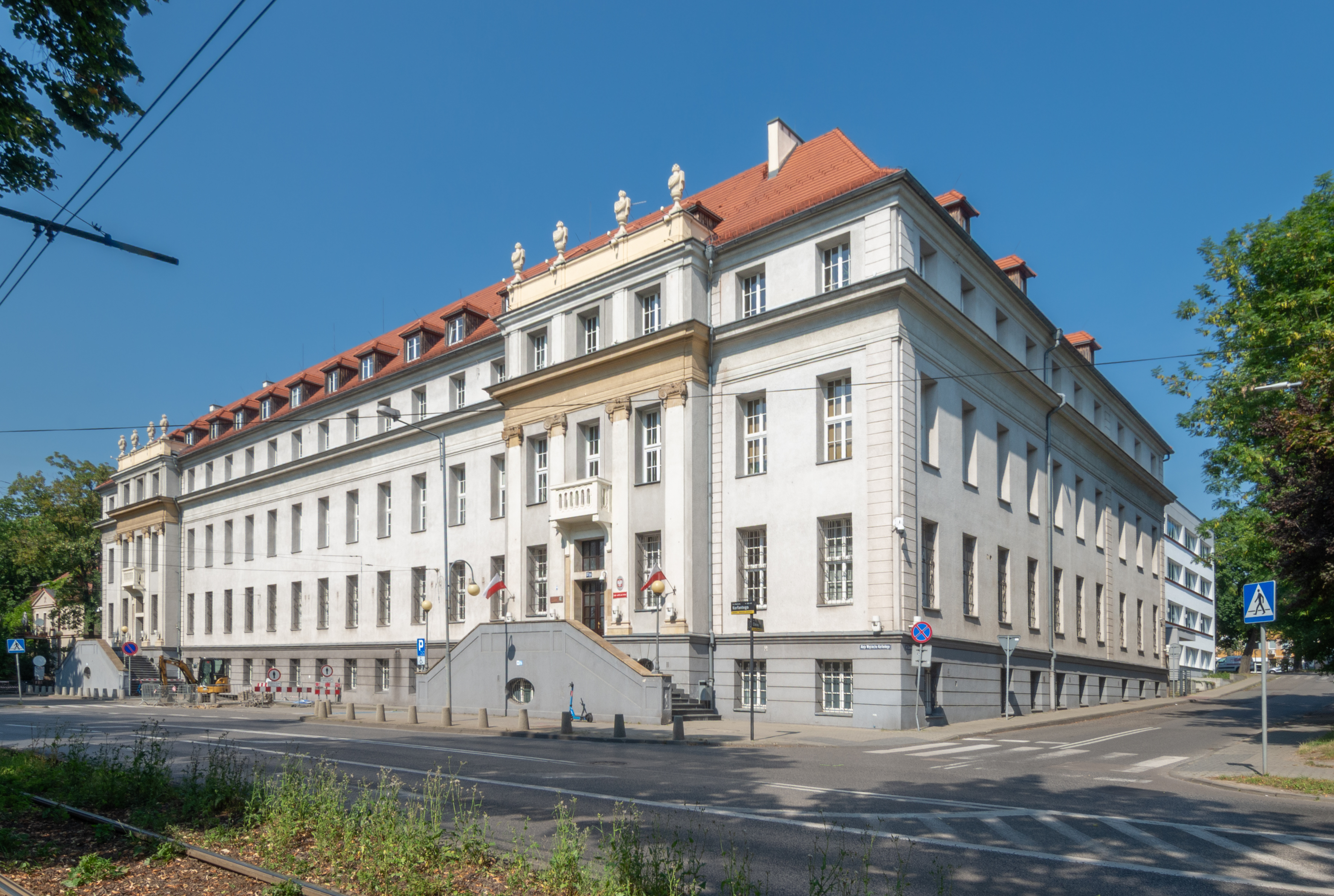
Court of Appeal (117, 119 W. Korfanty Avenue)

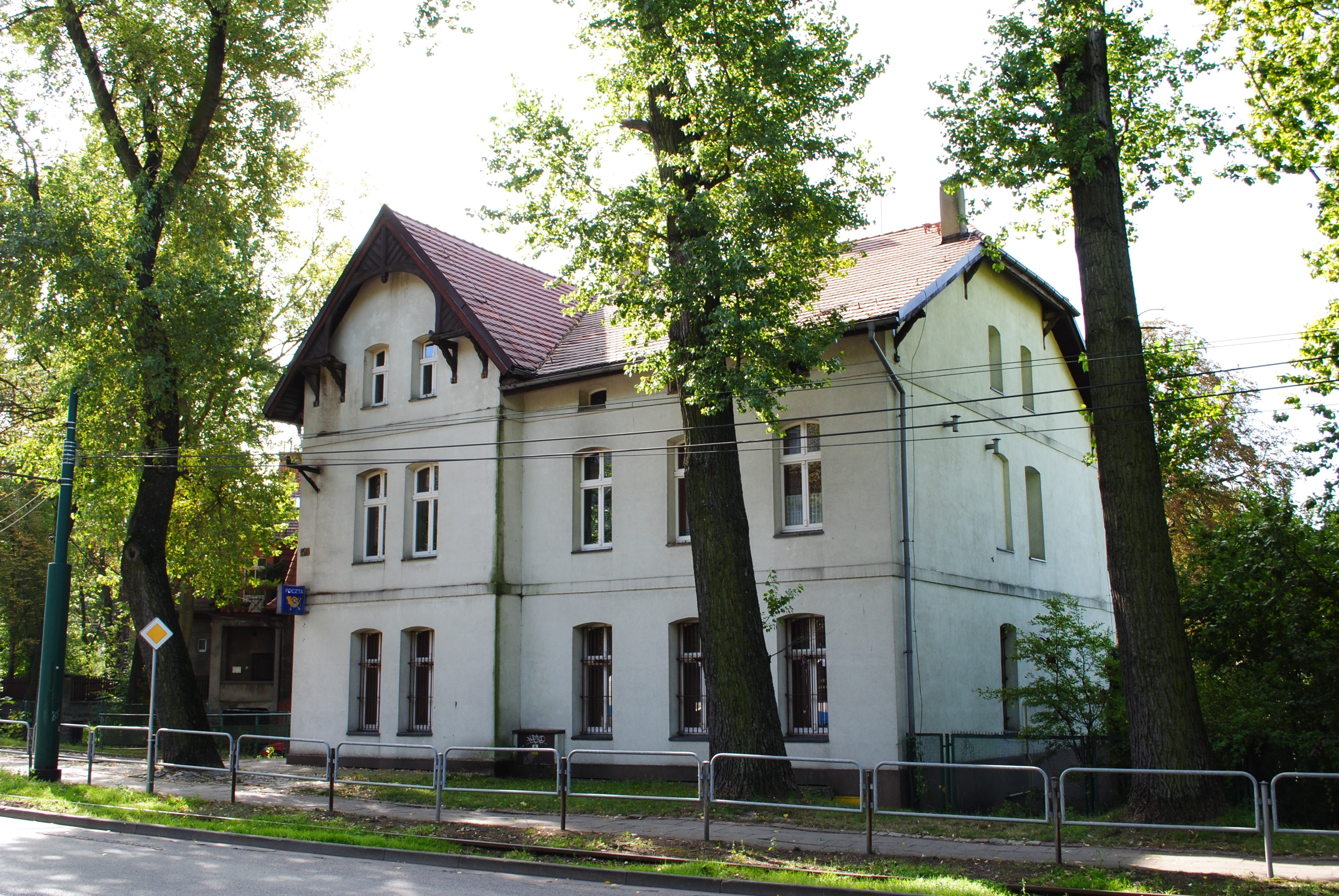
Historical post office (128 W. Korfanty Avenue)

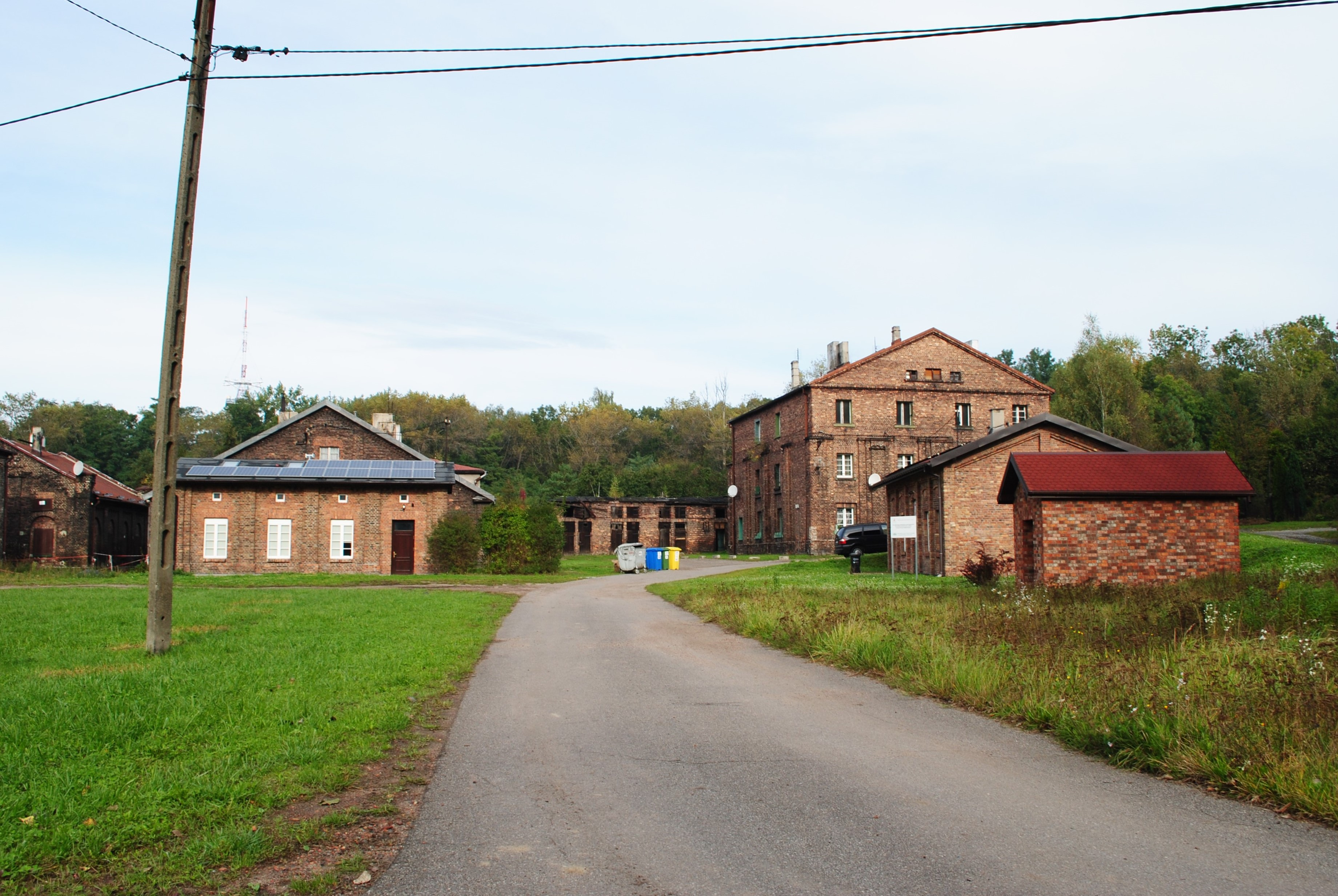
Alfred mine shaft buildings (182, 184 W. Korfanty Avenue)

== Institutions ==
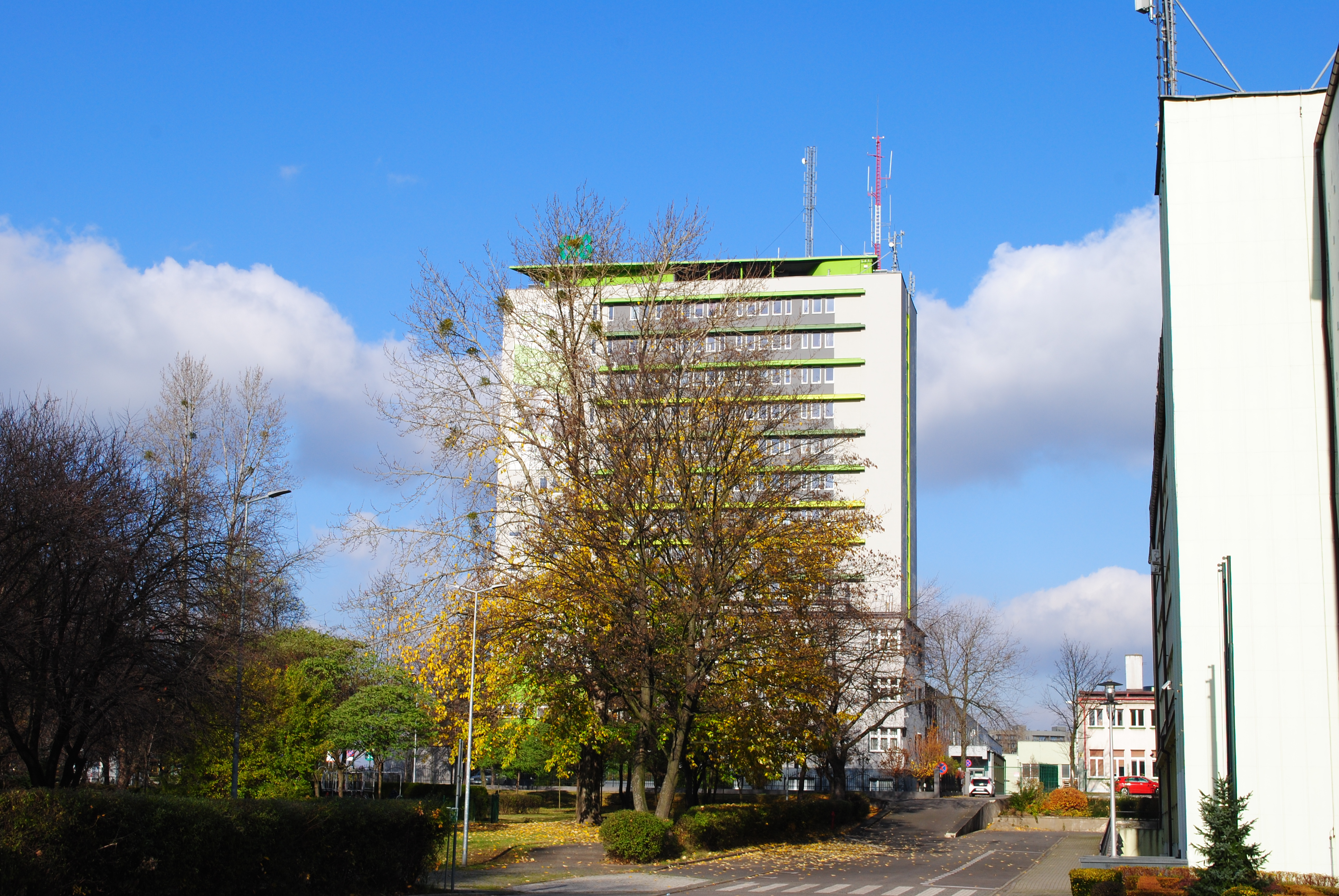
Skyscraper of the Central Mining Institute (79 Wojciech Korfanty Avenue)

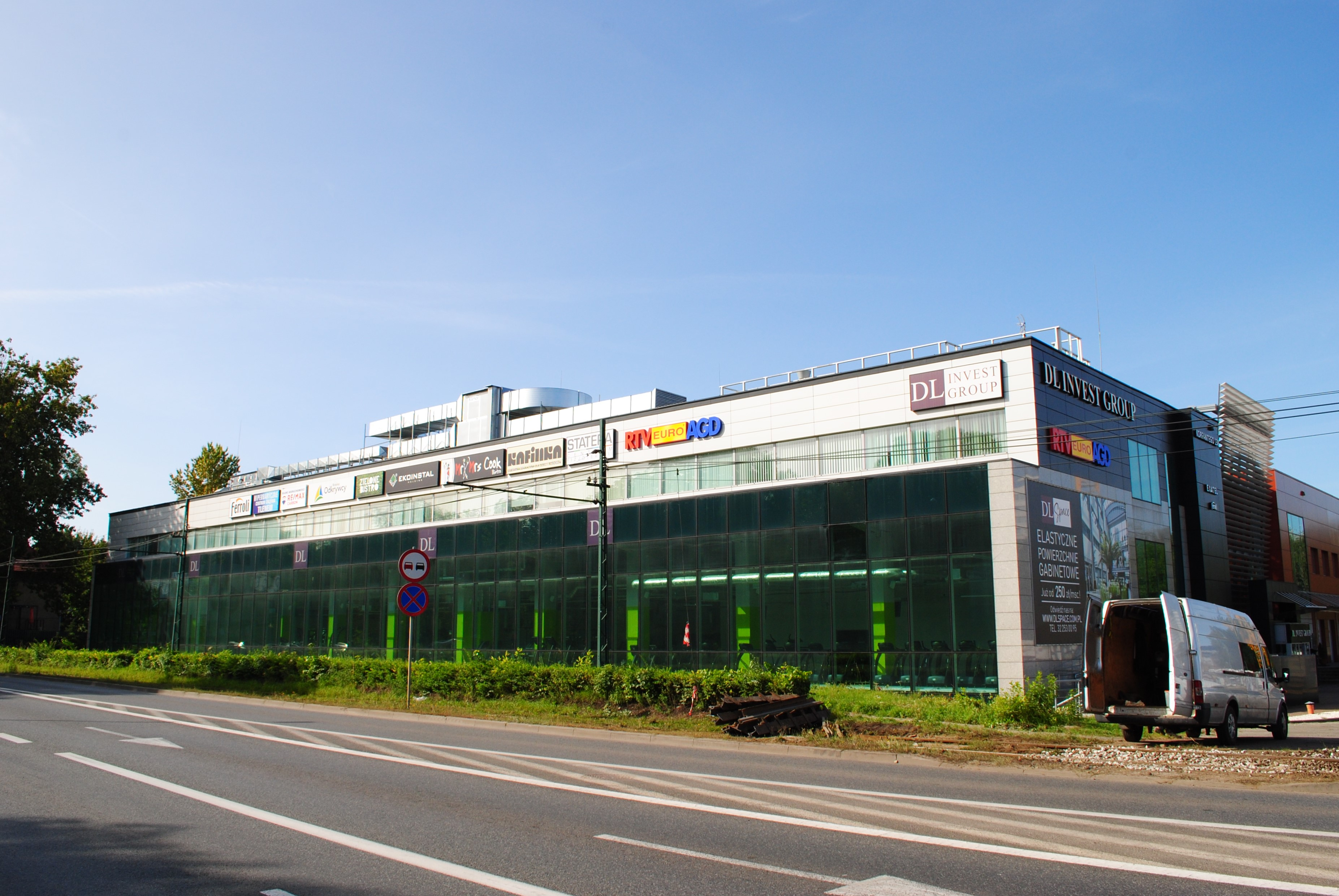
DL Center Point III building (138 Wojciech Korfanty Avenue)

As of March 2021, the following institutions are located along Wojciech Korfanty Avenue:

- Gallery of Contemporary Art of the Bureau of Artistic Exhibitions (6 Wojciech Korfanty Avenue);
- Silesian Society for Promoting Physical Culture in Katowice (8 Wojciech Korfanty Avenue);
- Silmaril Alternative Photography Studio (16 Wojciech Korfanty Avenue);
- Administration of the Superjednostka Housing Estate, Katowice Housing Cooperative (32/11 Wojciech Korfanty Avenue);
- Complex at 35 Wojciech Korfanty Avenue: Spodek Sports and Entertainment Arena (including an ice rink, gymnasium, and swimming pool), Hotel Diament Spodek;
- Upper Silesian Aviation Society (38 Wojciech Korfanty Avenue);
- Polish Mining Technology (51/46 Wojciech Korfanty Avenue);
- GIG Office Point skyscraper (79 Wojciech Korfanty Avenue);
- Department for the Construction of Scientific and Experimental Equipment and Apparatus (81 Wojciech Korfanty Avenue);
- Court of Appeals in Katowice (117/119 Wojciech Korfanty Avenue);
- Roman Catholic Parish of Our Lady Help of Christians (121/1 Wojciech Korfanty Avenue);
- Katowice Geological Enterprise (125a Wojciech Korfanty Avenue);
- Katowice 12 Post Office (128 Wojciech Korfanty Avenue);
- DL Atrium (formerly Reinhold Center) – an office and conference building complex (138 Wojciech Korfanty Avenue); the first phase of construction was completed in 2010, including the PKP Cargo facility;
- Education and Business as well as the Craft Industry Vocational School of the First Degree in Katowice (141 Wojciech Korfanty Avenue);
- Building Research Institute, Warsaw. Silesian Branch (191 Wojciech Korfanty Avenue).

== Bibliography ==
- Abramski, J. (2000). Ulice Katowic [Streets of Katowice] (in Polish). Zawiercie: Graf−Mar. ISBN 83-913341-0-4.
- Broszkiewicz, J., ed. (1994). Ulice Katowic [Katowice – Spotlight on the City] (in Polish). Katowice: Urząd Miejski w Katowicach. ISBN 83-901884-0-6.
- Bulsa, Michał (2018). Ulice i place Katowic [Streets and Squares of Katowice] (in Polish) (3 ed.). Katowice: Prasa i Książka. ISBN 978-83-63780-28-9.
- Janota, J. (2010). Katowice między wojnami. Miasto i jego sprawy 1922-1939 [Katowice Between the Wars. The City and Its Affairs 1922–1939] (in Polish). Łódź: Księży Młyn. ISBN 978-83-7729-021-7.
- Moskal, J. (1993). Bogucice, Załęże et nova villa Katowice − Rozwój w czasie i przestrzeni [Bogucice, Załęże et Nova Villa Katowice − Development in Time and Space] (in Polish). Katowice: Śląsk. ISBN 83-85831-35-5.
- Szaraniec, Lech (1996). Osady i osiedla Katowic [Settlements and Districts of Katowice] (in Polish). Katowice: Artur. ISBN 83-905115-0-9.
