= Superjednostka =

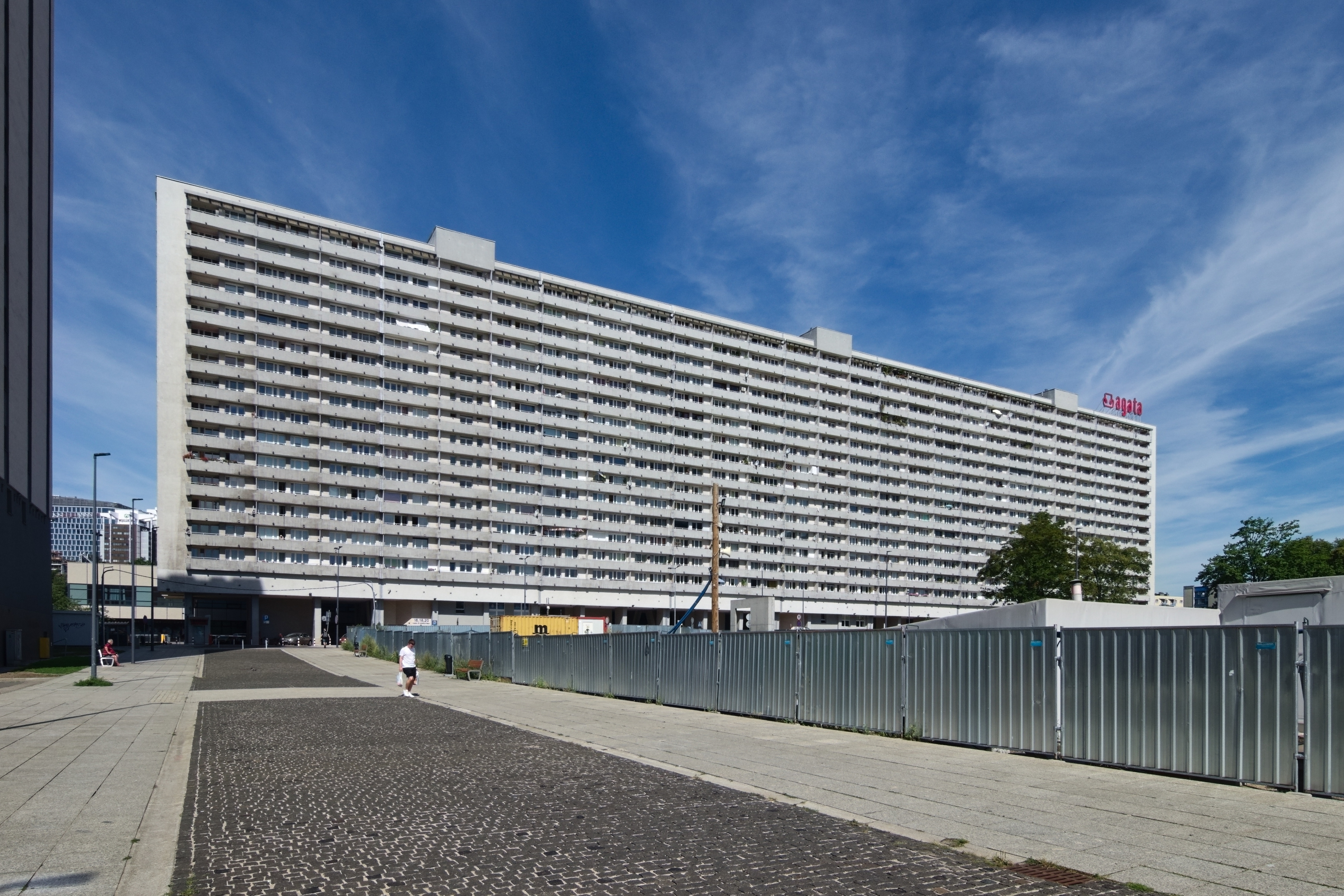
- Superjednostka in 2022
- Interactive map of the Superjednostka area

General information
- Architectural style: International; Brutalist
- Location: Aleja Wojciecha Korfantego 16-32, Poland
- Coordinates: 50°15′48.65″N 19°01′13.90″E
- Construction started: 1967
- Inaugurated: 1972

Design and construction
- Architect: Mieczysław Król

Superjednostka (Polish for super unit) is one of the largest residential buildings in Poland and was the largest when it was built in 1972. It is located in Katowice, Silesian Voivodeship, on Aleja Wojciecha Korfantego 16-32 near the Spodek arena complex. The building was designed by architect Mieczysław Król and is inspired by Le Corbusier's Unité d'habitation.

Superjednostka was intended as an architectonic counterpart to Spodek on the other side of Jerzy Ziętek Square. The apartment building contains 762 residential flats, 17 business premises and 175 underground car parking spaces. It covers a ground area of 9,817 m^{2} and is 187 m long. There are about 1300 people living in Superjednostka. The small flats with windowless kitchens were meant for couples without children and single persons. The heating in the flats is integrated into the walls, without visible radiators. This design was chosen by the architect because some elements for the originally planned radiators were not delivered on time.

Superjednostka's exterior was renovated from 2009 to 2010.

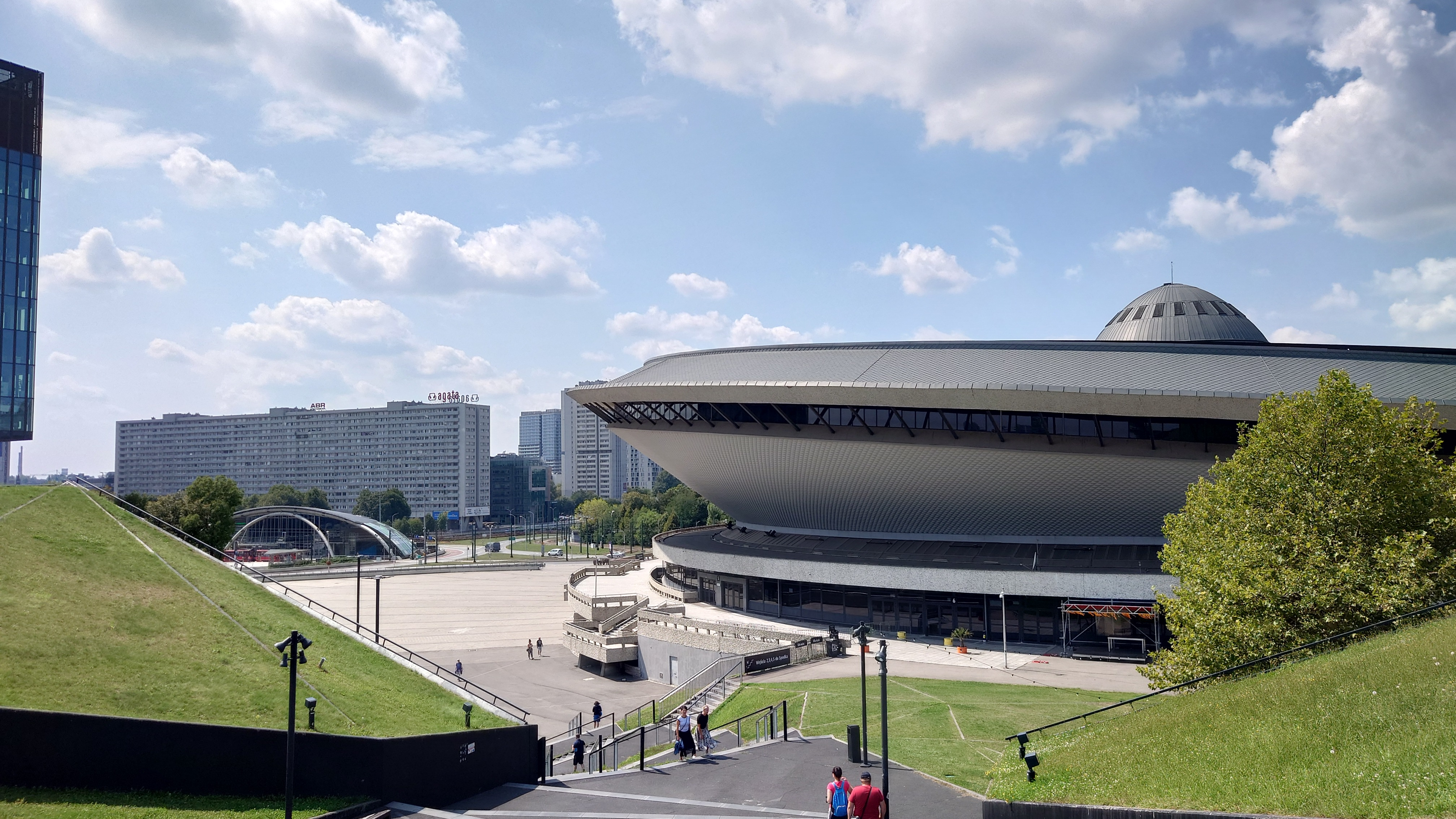
Superjednostka and Spodek in 2024

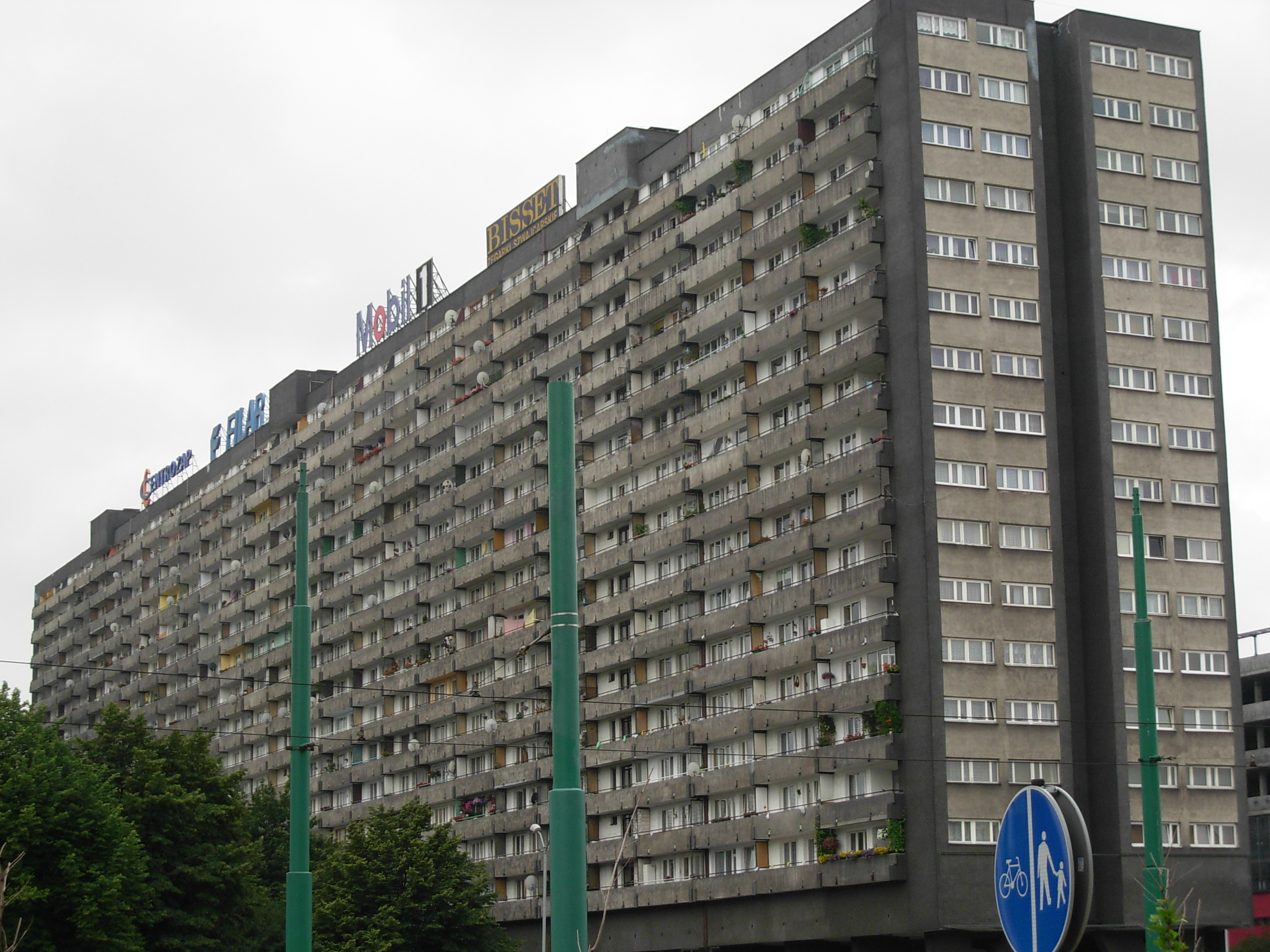
Superjednostka in 2007

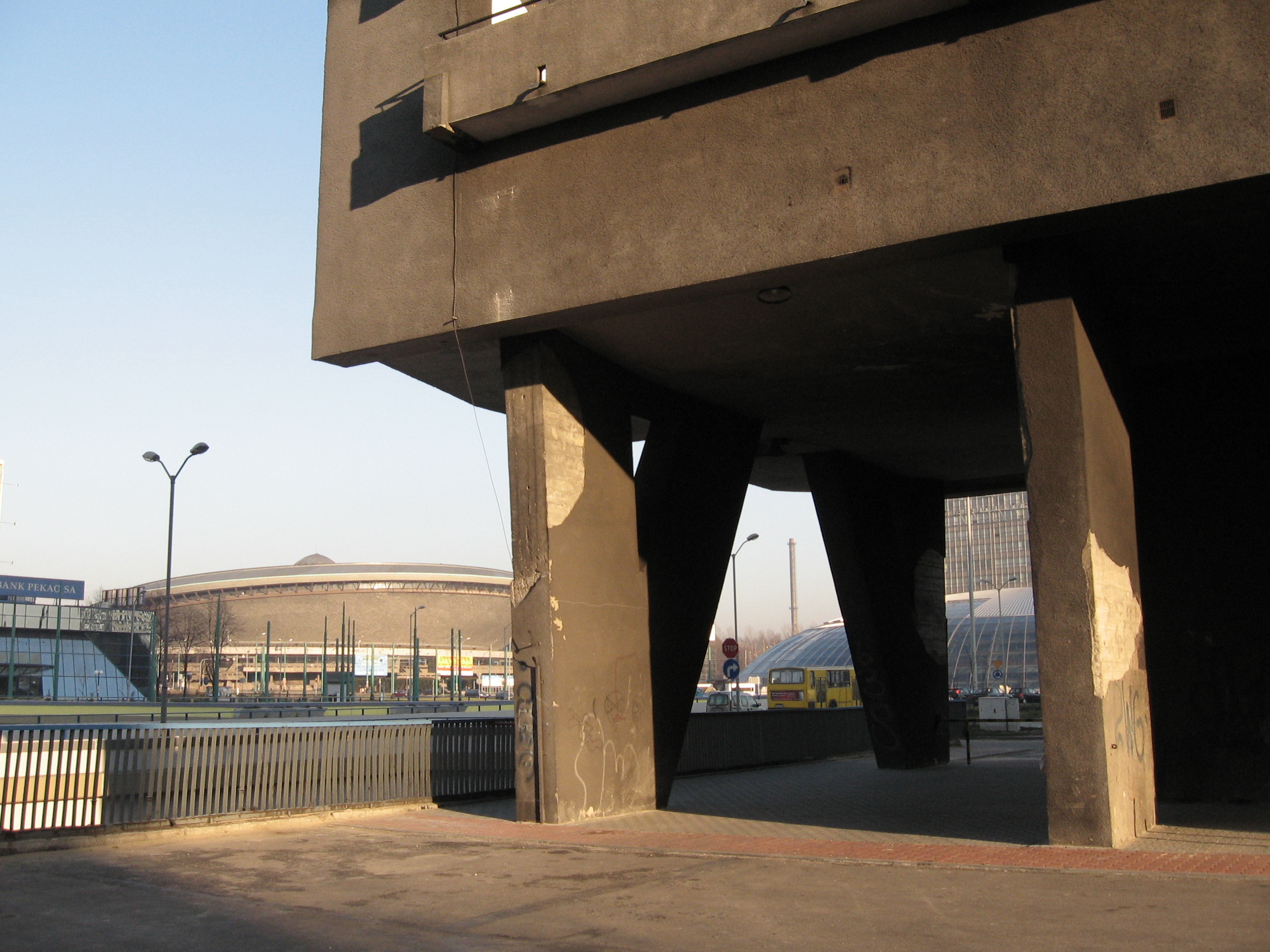
Part of Superjednostka with Spodek in the background (2006)
