= Silesia City Center =

Shopping centre in Katowice, Poland

Coordinates: 50°16′11″N 19°00′15″E

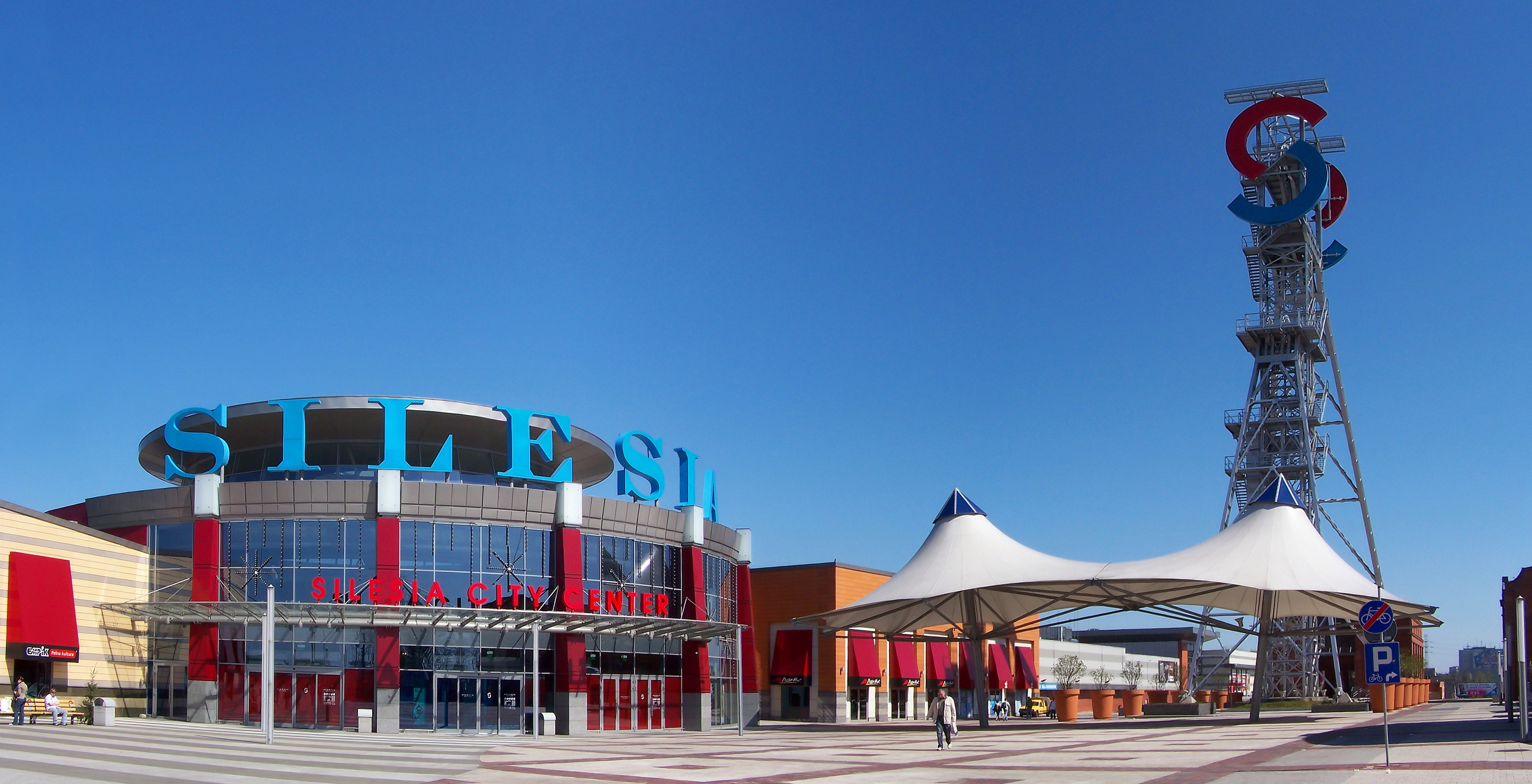
Main entrance

Silesia City Center is a shopping mall in Katowice, Silesia, Poland. It was opened in 2005 as the first modern shopping mall in Katowice. In 2015 it has been described as the "largest shopping mall in the Silesia region".

Its total area covers a few thousand square metres, of which 650 000 sq metres is a trade zone, 100 000 sq metres is a housing estate and 600 000 sq metres is an office site. It is situated in Katowice along 107 Chorzowska Road (the land previously belonged to the coal mine KWK Gottwald). The edifice was opened 18 November 2005. An investor is Hungarian company - TriGranit Development Corporation.

== Inside ==
In total, in Silesia City Center there are almost 850 shops, 40 cinema chambers (Cinema City), the centre of entertainment Fun City (with amusement arcade, club, billiards and bowling alley), banks and restaurants. On a rooftop there is a garden. There are partly underground car parks for 3000 cars as well (a red and a blue one), two guarded car parks and a free one for bicycles. Inside, in Tropical Square, there is a fountain, whose water is flipped approximately 13 metres up. The centre is divided into 43 avenues, named after main cities in Śląsk and Zagłębie Region, and 145 squares, acting as places facilitating meetings and leisure. Shops are situated round these squares and avenues, whose total length amounts over 10 kilometre.

In January 2007 on SCC's area new points enabling access to the Internet were introduced. The Internet is available also in Tropical Square and the centre of entertainment Fun City.

SCC has prepared payable skating rink, cloakrooms and skate hiring which are to be open from December to March.

== Surroundings ==
Historic buildings of a former mine, situated in a central point – nearby the entrance to the new object – have been restored, and their function has changed. Antique tower of a shaft ‘Jerzy’ is a symbol of combination the past with the future. Outside, exhibits connected with mining are assembled. Their aim is to remind of the former nature of this place. In a restored building there are, for example, there was an Almi Decor art gallery, more recently repurposed as a restaurant. Nearby, there is also a Saint Barbara's chapel (a patron saint of miners), which was consecrated 3 December 2005.
