= Drogowa Trasa Średnicowa =

Controlled-access dual-carriageway in Silesia, Poland

Coordinates: 50°17′55″N 18°50′56″E

Route information
- Length: 31.3 km (19.4 mi)

Major junctions
- Gliwice, ul. Portowa DK 88... 16.7 km (10.4 mi) Ruda Śląska 18.3 km (11.4 mi) ul. Niedurnego DW 925 21 km (13 mi) Świętochłowice, ul. Bytomska 22.3 km (13.9 mi) ul. Żołnierska, ul. Nomiarki 23.3 km (14.5 mi) Chorzów, ul. Dąbrowskiego 23.8 km (14.8 mi) ul. BoWiD 25 km (16 mi) ul. Gałeczki 26 km (16 mi) Katowice, ul. Mieszka I bridge over ul. Bracka, 600 m (2,000 ft) long 27.5 km (17.1 mi) DK 79 28.9 km (18.0 mi) ul. Stęślickiego, ul. Grundmanna 29.4 km (18.3 mi) ul. Sokolska 29.7 km (18.5 mi) Jerzy Ziętek Rondo under Jerzy Ziętek Rondo, northern 657 m (2,156 ft) long, southern 650 m (2,130 ft) long 31.3 km (19.4 mi) al. Roździeńskiego DK 86

Location
- Country: Poland
- Regions: Silesian Voivodeship
- Major cities: Gliwice, Zabrze, Ruda Śląska, Świętochłowice, Chorzów, Katowice

Highway system
- National roads in Poland; Voivodeship roads

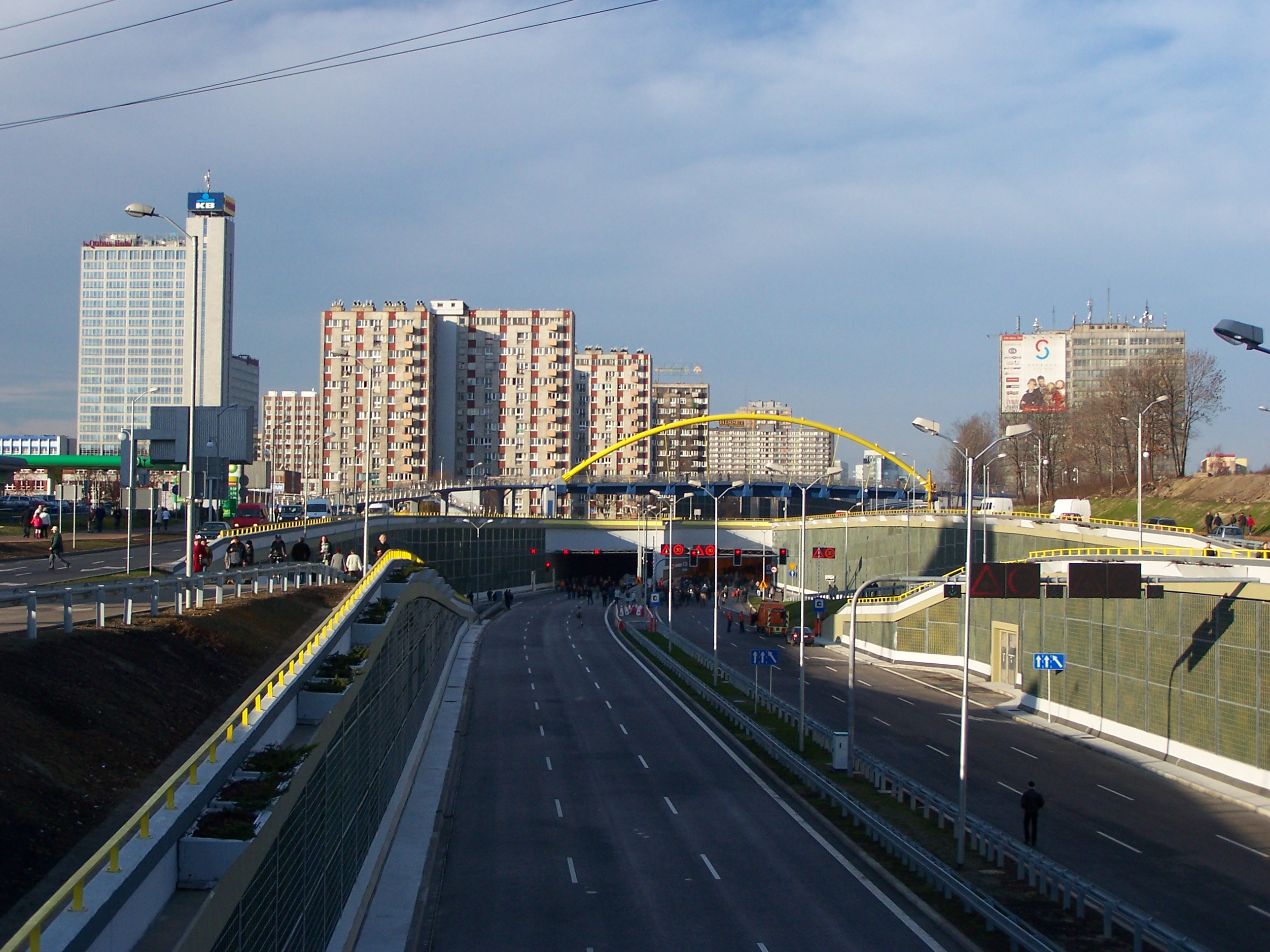
DTŚ in the Katowice city center

Drogowa Trasa Średnicowa (DTŚ, can be translated as diametral highway or central highway) is a controlled-access highway in Silesian Voivodeship, Poland. The DTŚ is entirely a dual carriageway with a minimum of 3 lanes in each direction. It is one of the most important roads of the Katowice urban area.

The DTŚ runs most of its course parallel to the A4 motorway but, unlike the A4, the DTŚ provides access to the congested city centers of the Metropolis GZM with 26 junctions (A4 has 6 junctions in the comparable section).

The DTŚ runs from Katowice through Chorzów and Świętochłowice, Ruda Śląska, Zabrze to Gliwice.

The construction of road resulted in a considerable improvement in the traffic of the highly urbanized area of the metropolis. It shortened the road distance between Katowice and Gliwice by 26%, travelling time by 76%, consumption of gasoline by 47%, the number of road accidents by 82%, exploitation costs by 39%, and air pollution by 50%.

== History of construction ==
The DTŚ is the largest road investment ever carried out by a local government in Poland. The construction started in 1986. In 1990, due to Polish financial problems, the work practically halted. Since 1994 the budget for construction increased thanks to the European Investment Bank (EIB) that provided a guarantee of funding. Since 1999 the construction of the DTŚ has been a shared responsibility of the Polish government, local government of the Silesian Voivodeship and of the cities through which the road runs, and work progresses steadily. A local organization in Gliwice has been protesting against proposed layout of the road through the city center (on ecological basis). The construction has been completed in 2016.

An eastern extension of the DTŚ is planned for a more distant future. This branch would run from Katowice to Mysłowice, Sosnowiec, Będzin and Dąbrowa Górnicza. The planned length of this section is 22.3 km (13.9 mi).
