= Jerzy Ziętek Square, Katowice =

Roundabout in Katowice, Poland

Coordinates: 50°15′51.38″N 19°1′22.8″E

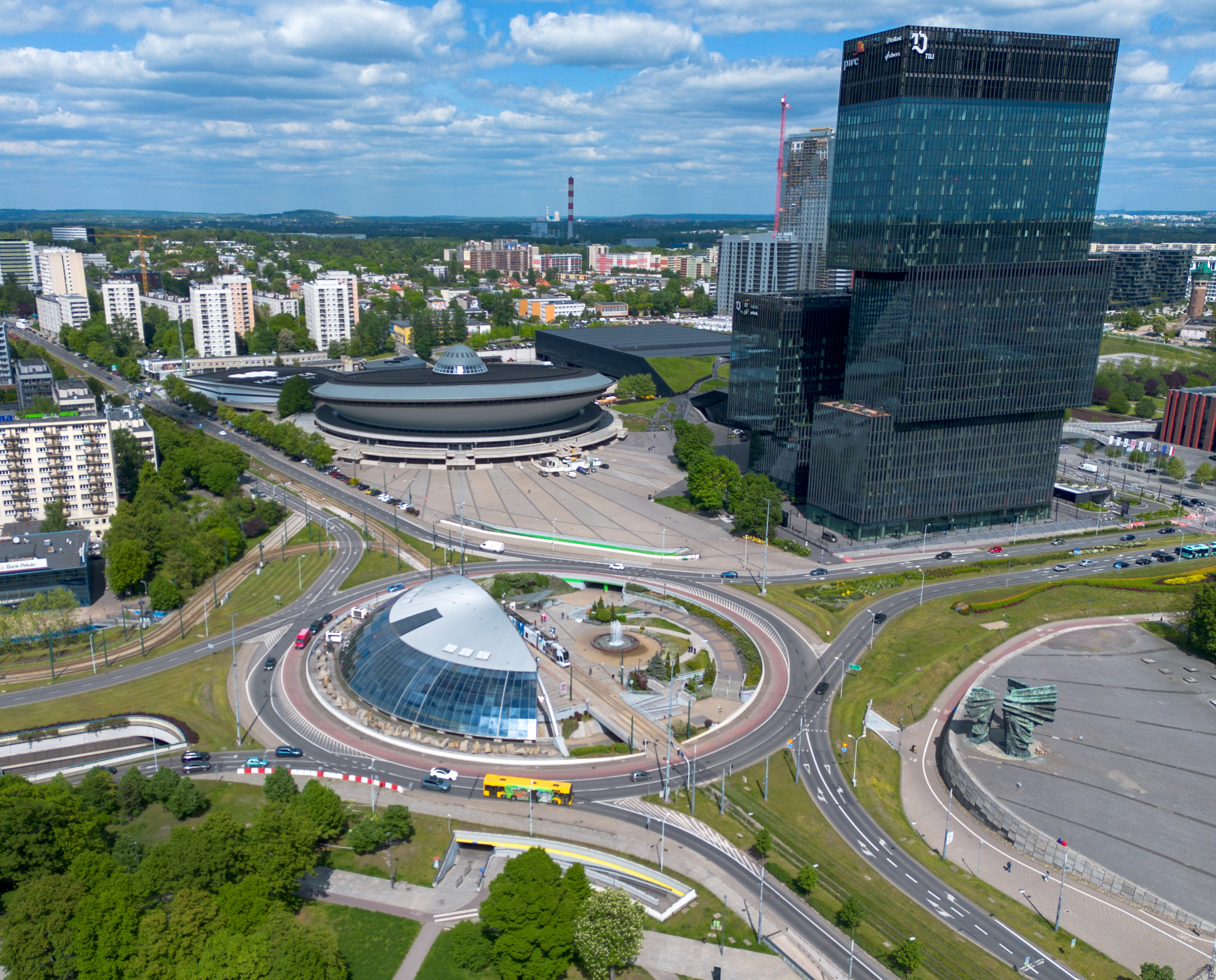
Aerial view

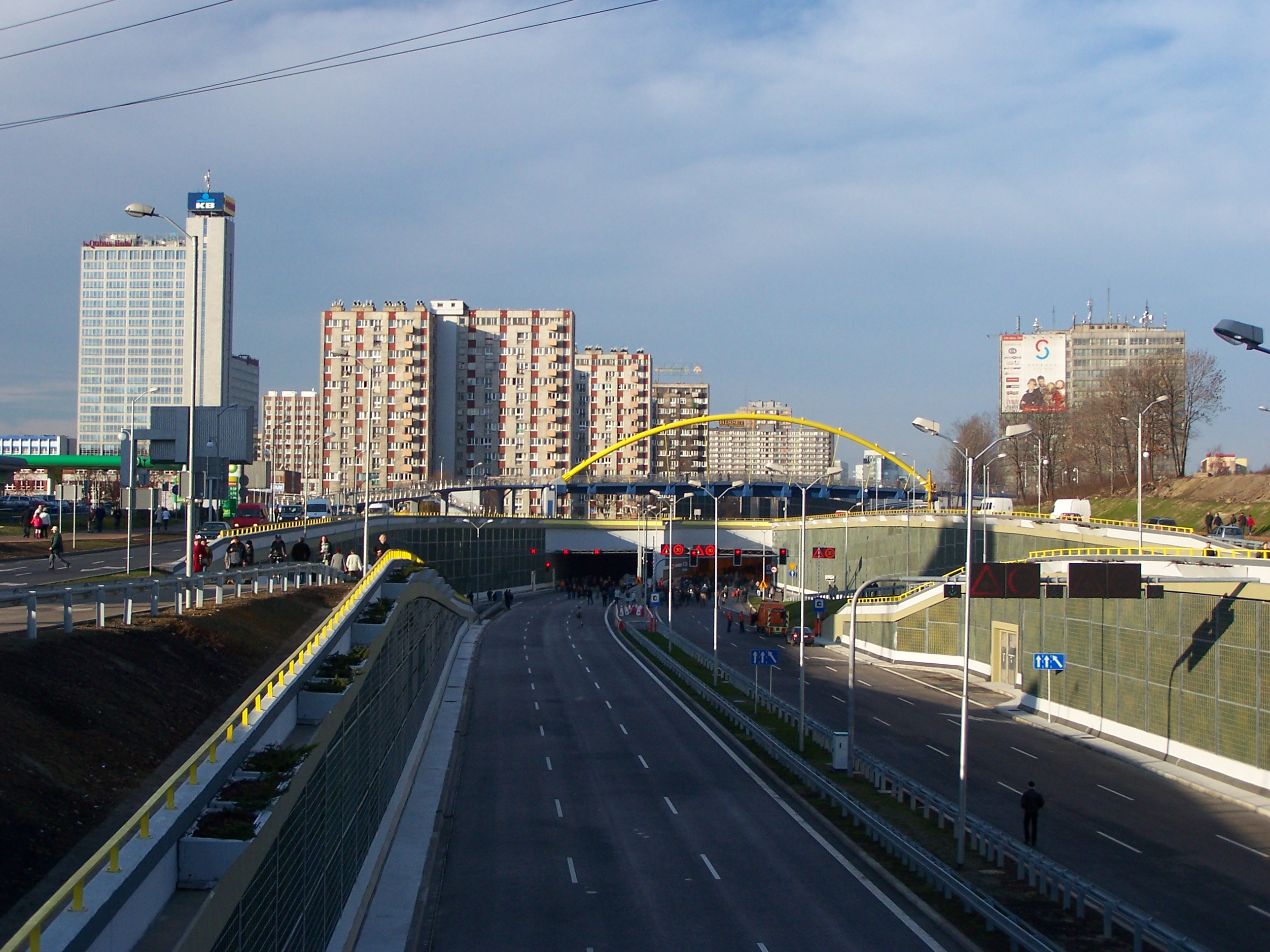
Two tunnels.

The Rondo Generała Jerzego Ziętka in Katowice is the roundabout in the centre of the city, in the Silesian Voivodship in southern Poland. On that main traffic circle, the Aleja Korfantego and the road 79, part of the Drogowa Trasa Średnicowa, meet.

To allow an easy passage through the Katowice city centre for road 79, two tunnels of 657 and 650 metres have been built. There are ramps leading to the roundabout, which are the exit for the city centre. Also, a new bus and tram station, fully equipped for handling disabled people, has been built.

The traffic circle, dedicated to general Jerzy Ziętek, has three levels. At -1 level, the tunnel is located, on the ground floor there are various business offices, and on the +1 level the Katowice Museum of Fine Arts and an information centre about the city are present. A glass cupola tops it all.

General Jerzy Ziętek, namegiver of the Rondo, and Wojciech Korfanty, namegiver of one of the streets that crosses it, were named as the two most important Silesian persons in the 20th century by the Gazeta Wyborcza, with Korfanty coming in first and Ziętek second.
