= Koszutka =

District of Katowice

- Katowice District
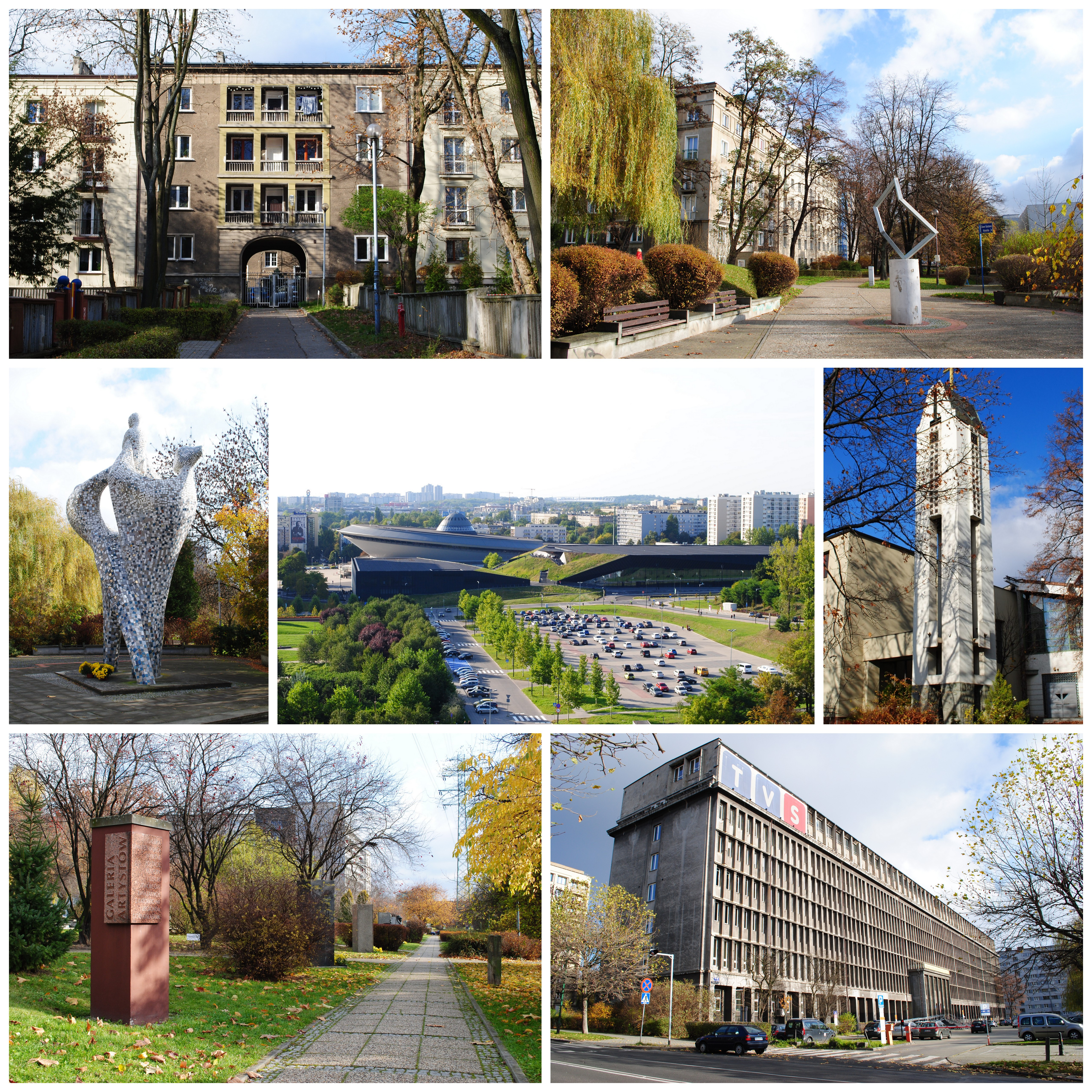
- Part of Osiedle Koszutka on M. Grażyński Street, G. Holoubek Square, Rodzina monument, view of the International Congress Center and Spodek arena, Church of the Sacred Heart of Jesus, Artists' Gallery, building of the Coal Industry Studies and Design Office

- Location of Koszutka within Katowice
- Coordinates: 50°16′15.869″N 19°01′15.843″E
- Country: Poland
- Voivodeship: Silesian
- County/City: Katowice
- Established: 1 January 1992 (district); 17th century (part of a locality)
- In the borders of Katowice: 15 October 1924 (part of a locality)

Area
  - Total: 1.38 km^{2} (0.53 sq mi)
- Elevation: 265–300 m (869–984 ft)

Population (2020)
  - Total: 10,121
  - Density: 7,330/km^{2} (19,000/sq mi)
- Time zone: UTC+1 (CET)
  - Summer (DST): UTC+2 (CEST)
- Area code: (+48) 032

Koszutka (German: Kossutka) is a part and a district of Katowice, located in the northern part of the city, in the Chorzów Hills, bordering Wełnowiec-Józefowiec, Bogucice, Śródmieście, and Dąb. It is the smallest in terms of area and one of the most densely populated districts of the city, with a large proportion of elderly residents. It is mainly residential, with a well-developed service sector, and is also the seat of several public administration institutions.

Koszutka began to develop in the 17th century as a colony of Bogucice. Its growth in the 19th century was limited due to mine subsidence caused by underground fires in coal seams. Koszutka underwent major transformation during the Polish People's Republic era, when the construction of Osiedle Juliana Marchlewskiego (renamed Osiedle Koszutka in 1990) began in the 1950s. As part of post-war expansion, many residential and public buildings were constructed, the oldest of which are in the socialist realist style. The most characteristic buildings in Koszutka include the Kosmos Cinema near Grunwaldzki Square, the building of the Coal Industry Studies and Design Office, Galeriowiec, Górnik I and Podkowa residential buildings, the Spodek arena, and the now-demolished Polish State Railways Regional Directorate building, which has been replaced by the .KTW office complex.

The main transport routes in Koszutka include Chorzowska Street and Wojciech Korfanty Avenue, which intersect at Jerzy Ziętek Square. Tram lines also run along these streets, connecting the district with other cities in Metropolis GZM. The district has an area of 1.38 km², and at the end of 2020, it had 10,121 inhabitants.

== Geography ==
=== Location ===
Koszutka is one of Katowice's 22 districts (auxiliary unit No. 12), belonging to the group of downtown districts. It is the smallest district of the city in terms of area, covering 138 ha, which accounts for 0.84% of Katowice's territory. Koszutka is located in the northern part of the city, 3 kilometres from center, and borders Wełnowiec-Józefowiec to the north, Bogucice to the east, Śródmieście to the south, and Dąb to the west. The district's boundaries are as follows:

- to the north – from the intersection of Słoneczna and C. K. Norwid streets to the east, parallel to Słoneczna Street (the buildings on this street belong to Wełnowiec-Józefowiec), then continuing parallel to Jesionowa and Cedrowa streets;
- to the east – it surrounds the townhouse estate on Brzozowa and Osikowa streets, then runs south along Brzozowa Street to the intersection with J. Ordon Street and further along Olimpijska Street to the junction with Walenty Roździeński Avenue;
- to the south – along W. Roździeński Avenue, then it surrounds Jerzy Ziętek Square from the south, after which the border runs along Chorzowska Street to the intersection with Jan Nepomucen Stęślicki Street;
- to the west – along J. N. Stęślicki Street (along the western traffic lane of this street), then along the green belt in the place of the former railway track to the intersection of Słoneczna and C. K. Norwid streets.

According to Jerzy Kondracki's physio-geographical regionalization, Koszutka is located in the Katowice Upland mesoregion, which forms the southern part of the Silesian Upland macroregion. The Silesian Upland itself is a part of the Silesian-Kraków Upland subprovince. Historically, it forms part of eastern Upper Silesia.

=== Geology ===
Koszutka is located in the Upper Silesian Sinkhole in an area with horst structures. At the turn of the Devonian and Carboniferous periods, the Paleozoic bedrock of the Silesian Uplands was disturbed by the formation of a sinkhole, which during the Carboniferous was filled with conglomerates, sandstones, and shales containing bituminous coal deposits. These formations form the bedrock of the district, while the upper series overlying the northern part of Koszutka, north of Katowicka, J. Ordon, and Misjonarzy Oblatów MN streets. There are also outcrops of the Ruda layers (younger Carboniferous series – Westphalian A) belonging to the Łęka group. Their total thickness reaches 300 m. In the lower part, this layer is composed of sandstones with about six thin coal seams, while the upper part, composed mainly of shales, is much richer – it contains about 30 coal seams, 8 of which are more than 1 m thick. The area where the townhouses on Osikowa and Cedrowa streets are located is formed by saddle beds with a thickness of 73–76 m, containing up to 4 coal seams with a total thickness of 14–17 m.

The main features of Koszutka's terrain were formed during the Tertiary period, with intensive processes of chemical weathering and denudation occurring at that time. During the Quaternary, the area was likely covered by the Scandinavian ice sheet twice: during the oldest Mindel glaciation and during the Riss glaciation. The sediments from the first glaciation were mostly removed during the interglacial, while the Riss glaciation ice sheet left behind tills along valley depressions. The southern and northwestern parts of Koszutka are composed of Pleistocene glacial and fluvioglacial sands and gravels.

In the current Holocene, processes of erosion and removal of Pleistocene sediment covers are occurring. Holocene alluvial deposits extend meridionally in a line from Wełnowiec through Koszutka to the Rawa river valley, parallel to the west of Sokolska Street.

=== Topography ===
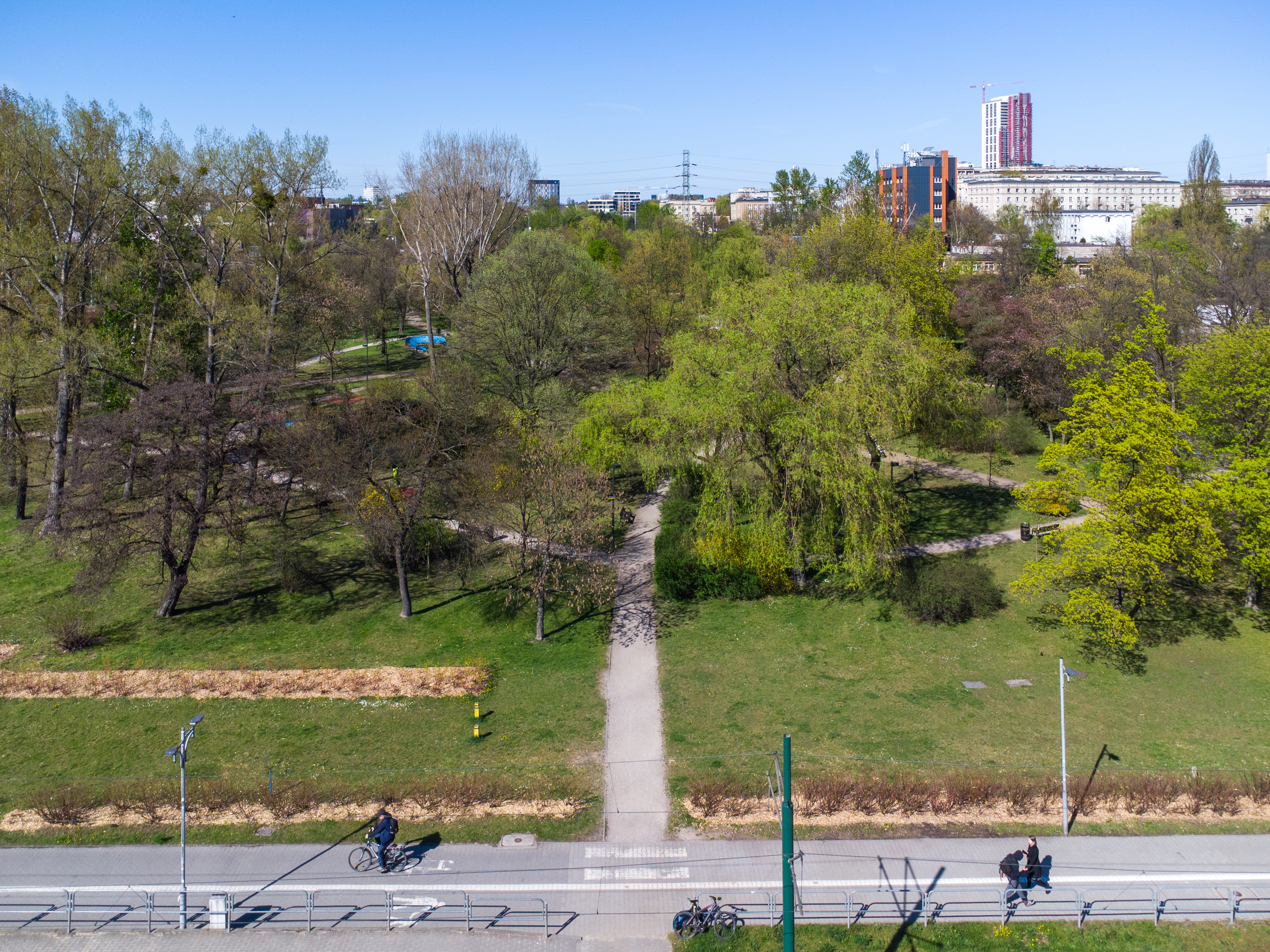
Aerial view of Alojzy Budniok Park, developed on the terrain of the Wełnowiec Trench

Koszutka is located in the Silesian Upland, on the Bytom-Katowice Plateau, which is part of the Katowice Upland mesoregion. The terrain of the district is varied. The southern and western parts consist of river valley floors with Pleistocene terraces, while the northern areas are hilly uplands formed on Carboniferous rocks.

The present-day relief of Koszutka was shaped mainly by the Mindel glaciation and the maximum stage of the Riss glaciation, while in recent times, human activity related to settlement and mining has also had a significant impact. This has led to the destruction of the natural substrate and the creation of new forms of landscape degradation. The entire area of the district also constitutes an anthropogenic surface of levelling.

In terms of morphological units, Koszutka is located on the Chorzów Hills. They form a series of undulating, rounded or flattened hills exceeding 300 m above sea level in several places – the so-called Bogucice fields. Towards the Rawa river valley, the slopes are cut by valley depressions, including the Wełnowiec Trench. The highest point of the district is located near the border of Koszutka and Wełnowiec-Józefowiec, on Cedrowa Street in its central part. The height of this hill reaches over 310 m above sea level (according to topographic maps, the height of the point is 313.74 m above sea level).

One of the hills in Koszutka is Kafeberg (or Caffeberg), on top of which the Church of the Sacred Heart of Jesus was built. The name of the hill was borrowed from a café that operated there in the 1920s. The area around the intersection of Wojciech Korfanty Avenue and Misjonarzy Oblatów MN Street is located at an altitude of 280.7 m above sea level, while the northern part of Alojzy Budniok Park is at an altitude of about 266 m above sea level. The lowest point stretches along Chorzowska Street on the border between Koszutka and Śródmieście, where the altitude drops below 265 m above sea level. The difference in altitude between the extreme points of the district is about 45 meters.

=== Soils ===
The soils in Koszutka have mostly developed on a substrate of wetland sands. Human activity has led to changes in soil properties, and long-term urban development has resulted in the formation of anthrosols in the district. Some of the land is affected by mining and contaminated with heavy metals. Anthrosols formed from tills dominate throughout the district. Human activity is the main soil-forming factor in these soils.

=== Surface and groundwater ===
Koszutka is located entirely within the Vistula drainage basin, in the basin of the Rawa river. The Rawa itself does not flow through the district, nor are there any water reservoirs there. Documents from 1698 mention Dębska Struga, a stream forming the border between Bogucice and Dąb, which flowed through Koszutka, among others.

In the classification of Bronisław Paczyński, Koszutka lies within the Silesian-Kraków hydrogeological region, in the Upper Silesian subregion. Aquifers occur in all layers, but their importance depends on several factors. According to the division of Poland into Uniform Groundwater Bodies, the entire district is located in Uniform Groundwater Body No. 111 (Central Vistula Uplands Subregion).

=== Climate and topoclimate ===
The climatic conditions in Koszutka are similar to those in Katowice as a whole, and are modified by both climatic and local factors. The climate of the district is influenced more by oceanic than continental factors, and is occasionally modified by tropical air masses arriving from the southwest through the Moravian Gate.

The average annual temperature in the multi-year period 1961–2005, measured at the nearby station in Muchowiec, was 8.1 °C. The warmest month in the period studied was July (17.8 °C), and the coldest was January (−2.2 °C). The average annual sunshine duration in the period 1966–2005 was 1,474 hours, while the average cloud cover in the same period was 5.3. The average annual precipitation in the period 1951–2005 was 713.8 mm. The average duration of snow cover is 60–70 days, and the growing season usually lasts from 200 to 220 days. Throughout the year, westerly and southwesterly winds prevail (20.7% and 20.4% of all winds, respectively), while winds from the north are the least frequent (5.7%). The average wind speed is 2.4 m/s.

The climate of the district is modified by local factors, depending on the land cover and the location in relation to river valleys – in the case of Koszutka, in relation to the Rawa river. In densely built-up areas, the local climate is influenced by the warming of the atmosphere as a result of human activity. Dense areas of buildings, roads, and squares cause an increase in air temperature in the ground layer of the atmosphere. These areas also lose heat faster due to radiation at night, and the lack of moisture in the air is not conducive to prolonged heat retention.

=== Nature and environmental protection ===
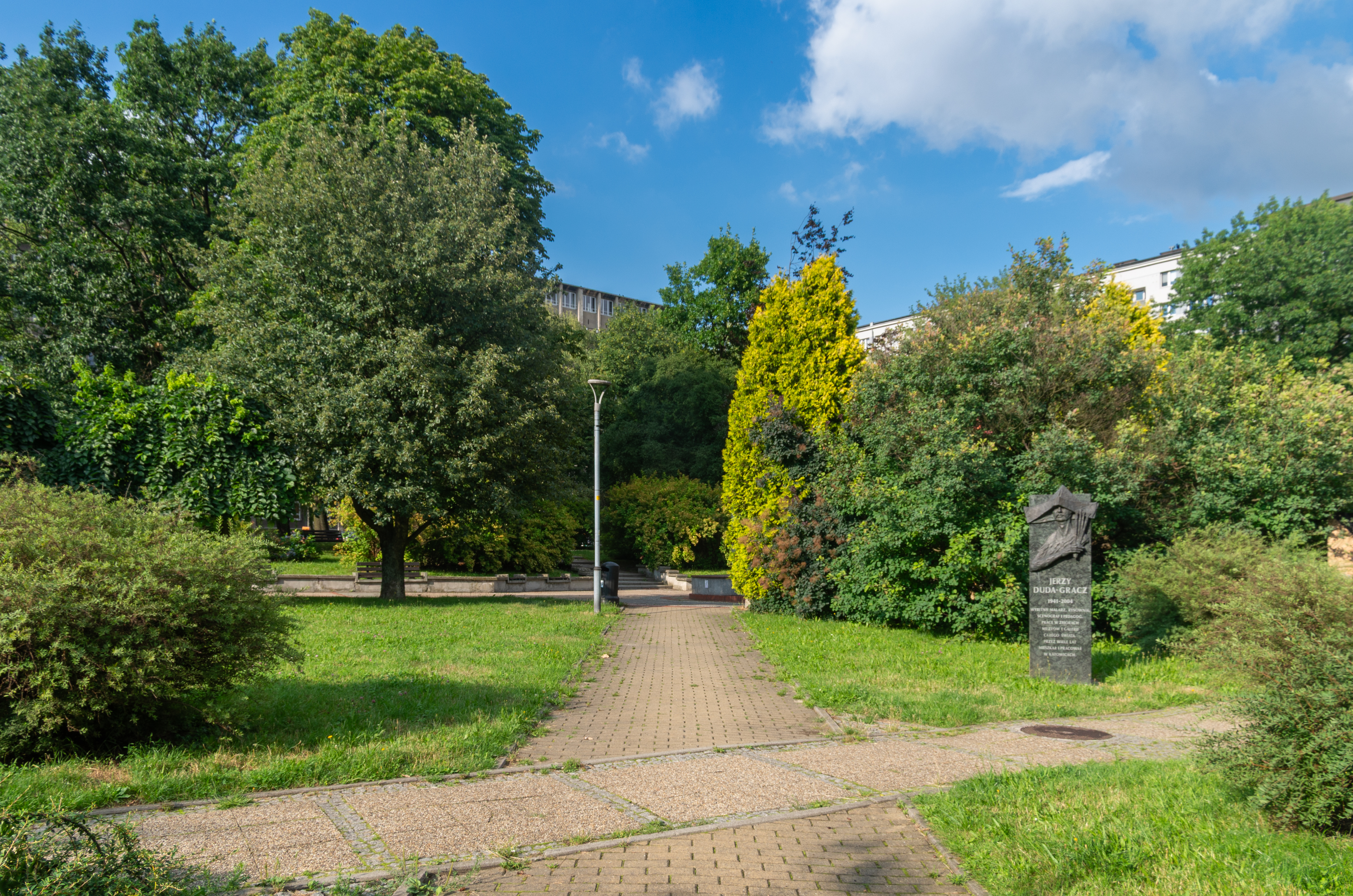
Part of Grunwaldzki Square

The natural vegetation in Koszutka has been shaped since the last glaciation 12,000–16,000 years ago, and over the last 200 years it has been subjected to strong anthropogenic pressure. Originally, the lower areas of the district were covered with oak-hornbeam forests, while beech forests were at higher altitudes. The development of dense housing has led to the almost complete disappearance of natural elements. Ruderal species have developed in urbanized habitats, thriving mainly in anthropogenic habitats of built-up areas and urban wasteland. Conditions were also created for the development of synanthropic animals, the most important of which are birds, including those that have long accompanied humans, such as the house sparrow and pigeon, as well as native birds that have adapted to urban conditions, including swifts, house martins, and barn swallows.

Today, the natural structure of Koszutka is dominated by greenery in the form of street plantings, courtyards, squares, and parks. These areas create green spaces of various sizes. When planning Osiedle Juliana Marchlewskiego, it was decided that green areas would be located along high-voltage lines. Today, the largest area of landscaped green space is Alojzy Budniok Park, located at the intersection of Chorzowska and Jan Nepomucen Stęślicki streets. Alojzy Budniok Park is one of the recreational areas for the residents of Koszutka with a sports field and a playground. Other larger green areas in the district include the green complex of Gustaw Holoubek, Grunwaldzki, and Gwarków squares. There are no allotment gardens within the boundaries of Koszutka.

== Name ==
The name "Koszutka" comes from the surname of one of its historical owners – Koczot (Koszot) – who leased a mill belonging to Kuźnica Bogucka. Members of the family appear in registry records in the second half of the 17th century. The sources mention, among others, miller Jadwiga Koczotka (or Koszotka). The court records also mention the name "Kosoci" to refer to the meadow of the parson of Chorzów Stary.

Initially, the settlement was known as "Kosocz", and in the 18th century, the diminutive form of the name became established – in 1739, the name "Koszotka" already appears. Later, the place was called "Koszytka", and then the name changed to "Koszutka".

The German names for Koszutka are "Koschutka" and "Kossutka".

== History ==
Koszutka was founded in the 17th century as a colony of Bogucice. Ludwik Musioł points out that the beginnings of settlement in Koszutka, dating back to the 17th century, covered areas that belonged to the church of Chorzów Stary at the time, and that the district was originally a hamlet of Dąb. In the first half of the 18th century, a watermill was operating in Koszutka, established in the same century by the miller named Koczot. It was located on a stream that no longer exists today, which was one of the tributaries of the Rawa river. Koszutka was then a single-farm settlement. In 1666, the miller's wife, Jadwiga (Hedwiga) Koczotka, was mentioned in documents[. Already in the 18th century, there was a road, along which today's Chorzowska Street runs.

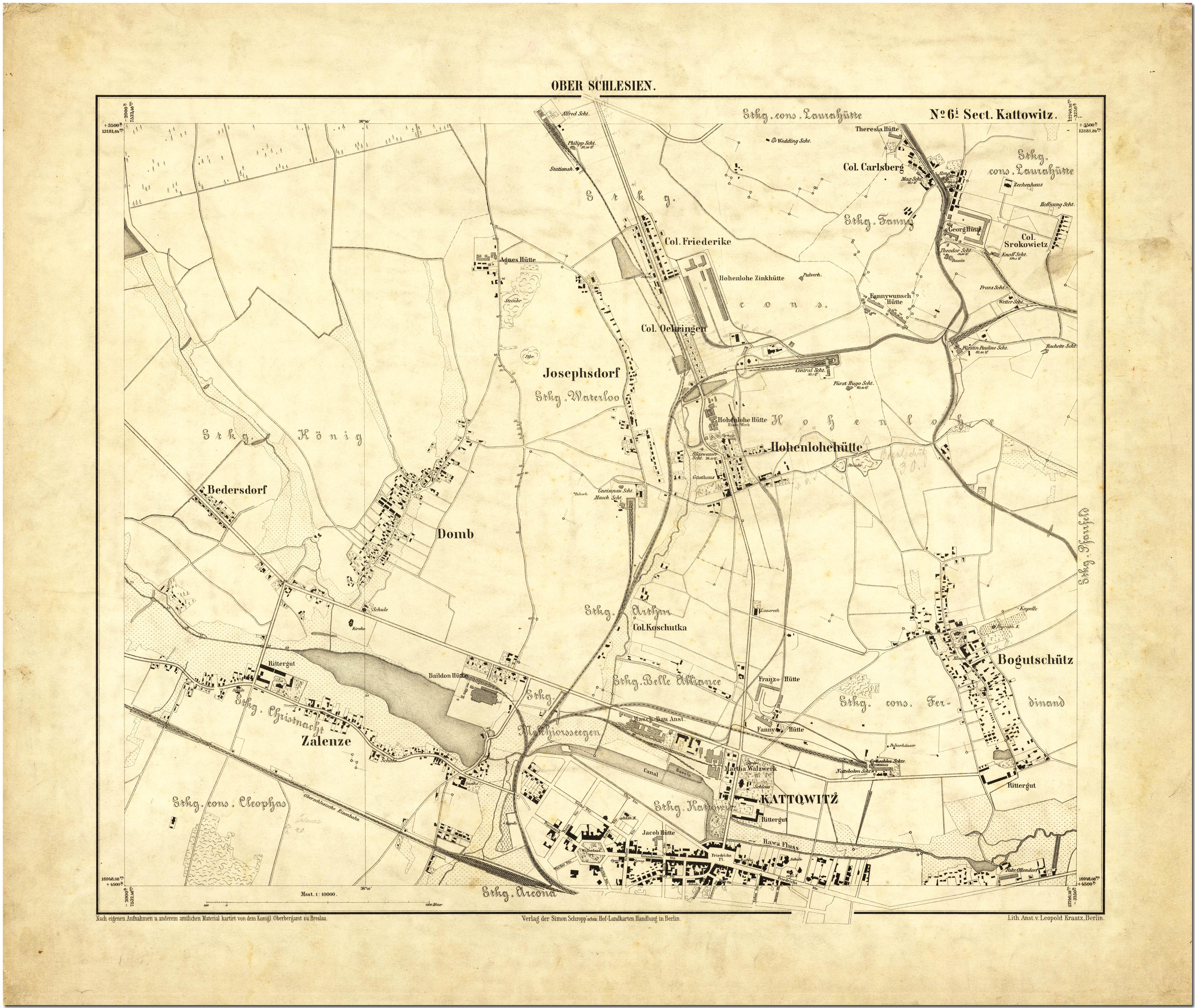
Map of northern Katowice from 1880, showing Koszutka marked as Col. Koschutka

The urban development of Koszutka did not take place until the 19th century, after the construction of two zinc smelters. In 1818 and 1820 two zinc smelters, Franz and Fanny, were opened on the manor grounds, on the eastern side of today's Wojciech Korfanty Avenue. In 1859, a network of railways was established in Koszutka to transport coal and products, connecting industrial plants in Katowice, Dąb, Bogucice (Ferdinand Coal Mine), and Wełnowiec (Hohenlohe Smelter). In 1896, a tram line was opened along what is now Chorzowska Street and W. Korfanty Avenue, on which steam trams began to run, followed two years later by electric trams.

The original buildings in Koszutka were constructed in the area of present-day Sokolska, Misjonarzy Oblatów MN, W. Broniewski, B. Czerwiński, and M. Grażyński streets. Maps from the early 19th century show a route connecting Katowice directly with Wełnowiec through Koszutka, along which the current W. Korfanty Avenue runs. At that time, there was a crossroads at the site of the present Jerzy Ziętek Square. The development of Koszutka was hampered by mine subsidence, which was probably caused by underground fires in the Fanny mine in Michałkowice (the fire lasted until 1823) and new buildings in the district were not constructed in the area of W. Korfanty Avenue until the 1930s. At the end of 1885, Koszutka had 820 inhabitants, and in 1907, 961 people lived there.

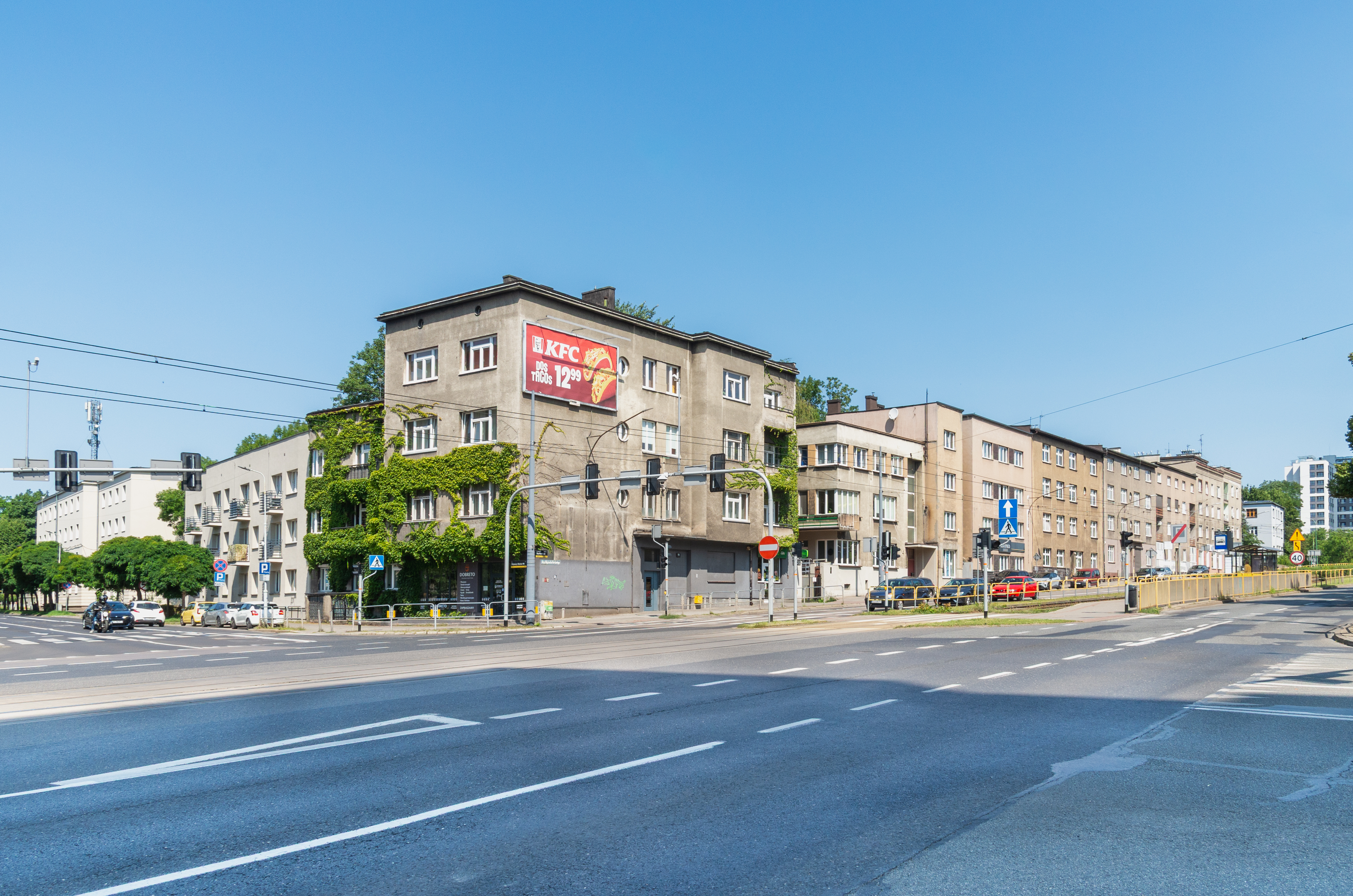
Interwar-period buildings along W. Korfanty Avenue

On 15 October 1924, Gmina Bogucice, together with Koszutka located within it, was incorporated into Katowice, becoming part of the city. During the Great Depression, the authorities of Katowice managed to obtain funds from the League of Nations to combat unemployment, which were allocated to the construction of roads, thanks to which, among other things, today's A. Górnik Street was built in Koszutka. In 1934, the Missionary Oblates of Mary Immaculate arrived in Katowice arrived in Katowice and two years later purchased a plot of land in the district to build their monastery. They also built a chapel, where a Roman Catholic parish was established on 2 December 1939. In 1940, the Germans confiscated the monastery building, leaving the monks with only a few rooms. The monastery housed the Supply Office (German: Versorgungsamt), while the building at today's 9 Misjonarzy Oblatów MN Street became the seat of the Volksdeutsche Mittelstelle during the German occupation of Poland.

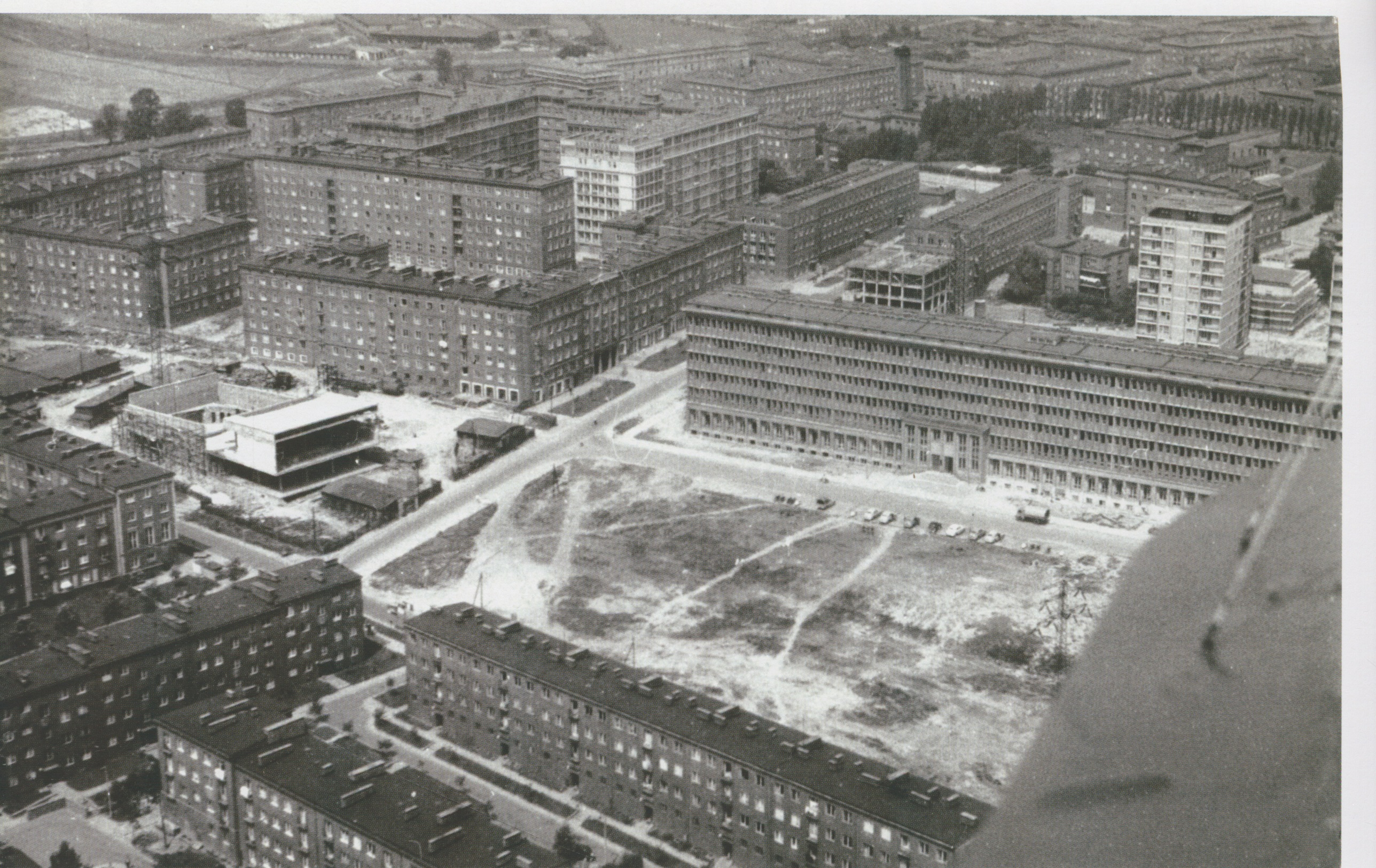
Koszutka in the area of Grunwaldzki Square in the 1950s

After World War II, at the turn of 1946 and 1947, a decision was made to expand the district and locate Osiedle Juliana Marchlewskiego there, with Koszutka becoming a dormitory suburb of Katowice. Construction work on the new housing estate began in 1948, commissioned by the Coal Industry Construction Office, with first buildings built in the 1950s. A number of distinctive buildings were constructed in the housing estate, such as the Coal Industry Study and Design Office building on Grunwaldzki Square from the 1950s and the Kosmos Cinema, which opened in 1965.

In May 1959, traffic lights were installed at the intersection of what were then F. Dzierżyński, W. Roździeński, and Red Army streets due to increased traffic. In the 1960s, the intersection was rebuilt into a roundabout, which was opened on 20 July 1965. During the Polish People's Republic, present-day Chorzowska Street was rebuilt and widened to two lanes in each direction, while the intersection with today's Sokolska Street was rebuilt into a two-level intersection. The tram tracks were moved under the viaduct. On 5 September 1964, a tram terminus was opened near the intersection with Słoneczna Street.

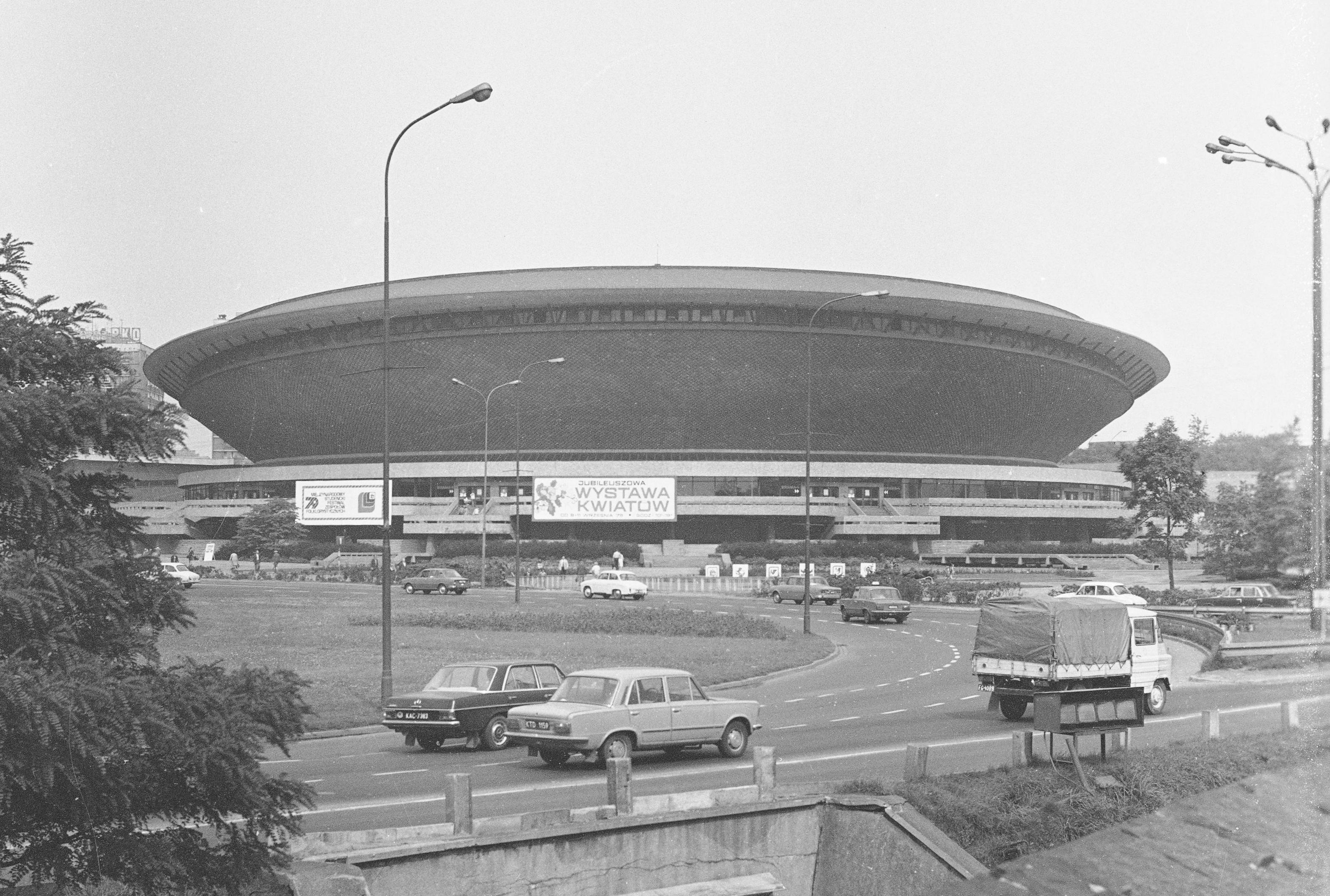
Spodek arena in 1979

At the turn of the 1960s and 1970s, the "Blue Blocks" and the adjacent commercial and service pavilions were completed in Koszutka. In 1971, Spodek, located on the border of the district, was opened. Over time, it became one of the main attractions of Katowice and its landmark. Various types of events, including world-class ones, were organized there. In the vicinity of Spodek, the Polish State Railways Regional Directorate building was erected between 1965 and 1972. It was demolished in 2015 and replaced by the .KTW office complex.

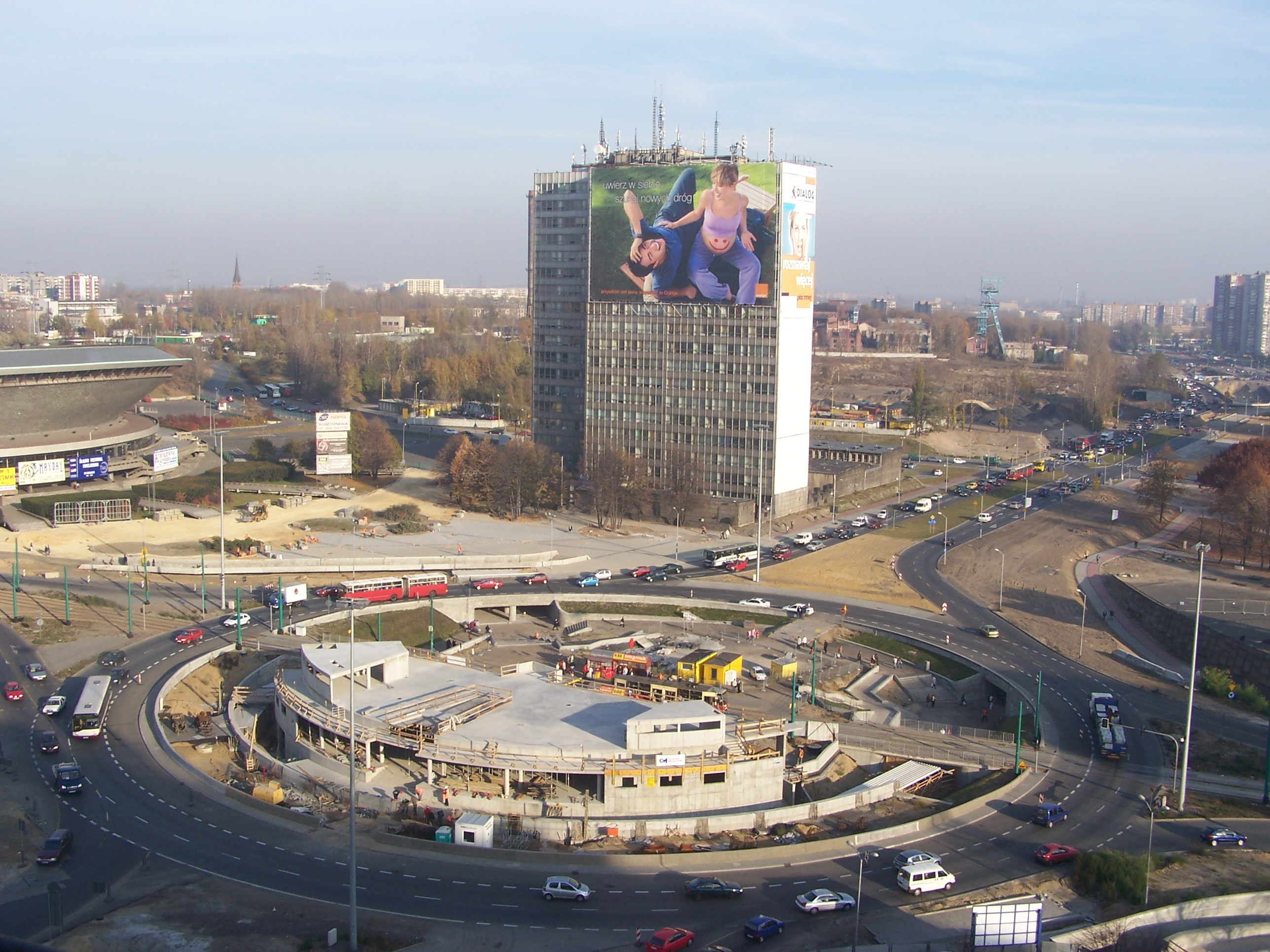
Construction of Drogowa Trasa Średnicowa and tunnel on the boundary of Koszutka and Śródmieście in November 2005

Pursuant to a resolution of the Katowice City Council dated 8 October 1990, the name "Osiedle J. Marchlewskiego" was changed to "Osiedle Koszutka". A year later, on 16 September 1991, the Katowice City Council adopted a resolution dividing Katowice into 22 auxiliary local government units and 22 areas of operation as of 1 January 1992. One of the units, designated No. 12, became "Koszutka".

Between 2001 and 2007, the section between Chorzowska Street, J. Ziętek Square, and W. Roździeński Avenue was rebuilt and became part of Drogowa Trasa Średnicowa. Among other things, a 600-meter tunnel was built under the roundabout. The current route of J. N. Stęślicki Street, located on the border between Dąb and Koszutka, was marked out along the route of the former railway. J. Ziętek Square was rebuilt between 2004 and 2006. A glass dome was built on the roundabout, which became the seat of the Rondo Sztuki gallery. In the area of the Wełnowiec Trench, where historically a stream flowed from the direction of Wełnowiec, the Alojzy Brudniok Park was established in 2011.

Between 2010 and 2015, the area of the former Katowice Coal Mine on the border between Bogucice and Koszutka was transformed into the Culture Zone – the International Congress Center was built in the Koszutka part of the zone, while in Bogucice, the new headquarters of the Polish National Radio Symphony Orchestra and the new headquarters of the Silesian Museum were built. On 11 February 2022, the .KTW II skyscraper located on W. Roździeński Avenue obtained a use permit, thus becoming the tallest office building in both the district and the entire Metropolis GZM.

== Demography ==
Population structure in Koszutka by gender and age (as of 31 December 2015)
Period/Number of inhabitants	pre-working age (0–18 years)	working age (18–60/65 years)	post-working age (over 60/65 years)	Total
Total	1,376	6,118	3,473	10,967
women	682	3,000	2,535	6,217
men	694	3,118	938	4,750
Femininity ratio	98	96	270	131

In 1988, present-day Koszutka was inhabited by 13,943 people. At that time, people over 60 years of age dominated, while the smallest share was represented by people under 14 years of age. At the end of 2005, 12,429 people lived in the district, and at the end of 2007, there were 12,431, which at that time accounted for 3.9% of the population of Katowice. The population density in the district during this period was 9,023 people per km², which was much higher than the average for the entire city, which was 1,916 people/km² at the time. In this respect, Koszutka is one of the most densely populated districts in Katowice, after Osiedle Tysiąclecia and Śródmieście.

The population of Koszutka, as well as the entire city of Katowice, is aging – in 2007, the proportion of people over 60 in Koszutka was one of the highest in the entire city. At the same time, between 1988 and 2007, Koszutka had one of the smallest population declines among all northern districts of Katowice.

In 2010, Koszutka had a population of 11,815, which accounted for 3.9% of the city's population at that time. Koszutka had the highest percentage of post-working-age population among the city's other districts, amounting to 32.5% of the district's inhabitants, while 11.5% of the population was of pre-working age.

On 31 December 2013, Koszutka had 11,293 residents, including 1,087 people under the age of 14, 2,688 women over the age of 60, and 1,030 men over the age of 65. The total number of people over 75 years of age living in the district at that time was 2,031, which accounted for 18% of the district's population – the highest percentage among all districts of Katowice.

Sources: 1885; 1907; 1988; 1997; 2005; 2010; 2015; 2020.

In a survey conducted in 2011, 69.6% of Koszutka residents declared Polish nationality, 16.1% declared Silesian nationality, and 14.3% considered themselves both Silesian and Polish.

In a biological forecast for 2030 developed in 2007, the population of the Koszutka-Wełnowiec urban unit in 2020 was estimated at 8,175 people (97.4% of the 2007 figure) in the pessimistic scenario, while in the optimistic scenario, it was estimated at 8,184 people (97.5% of the 2007 population). For 2030, the estimates were 6,404 (76.3%) and 6,615 people (78.8%), respectively.

== Politics and administration ==
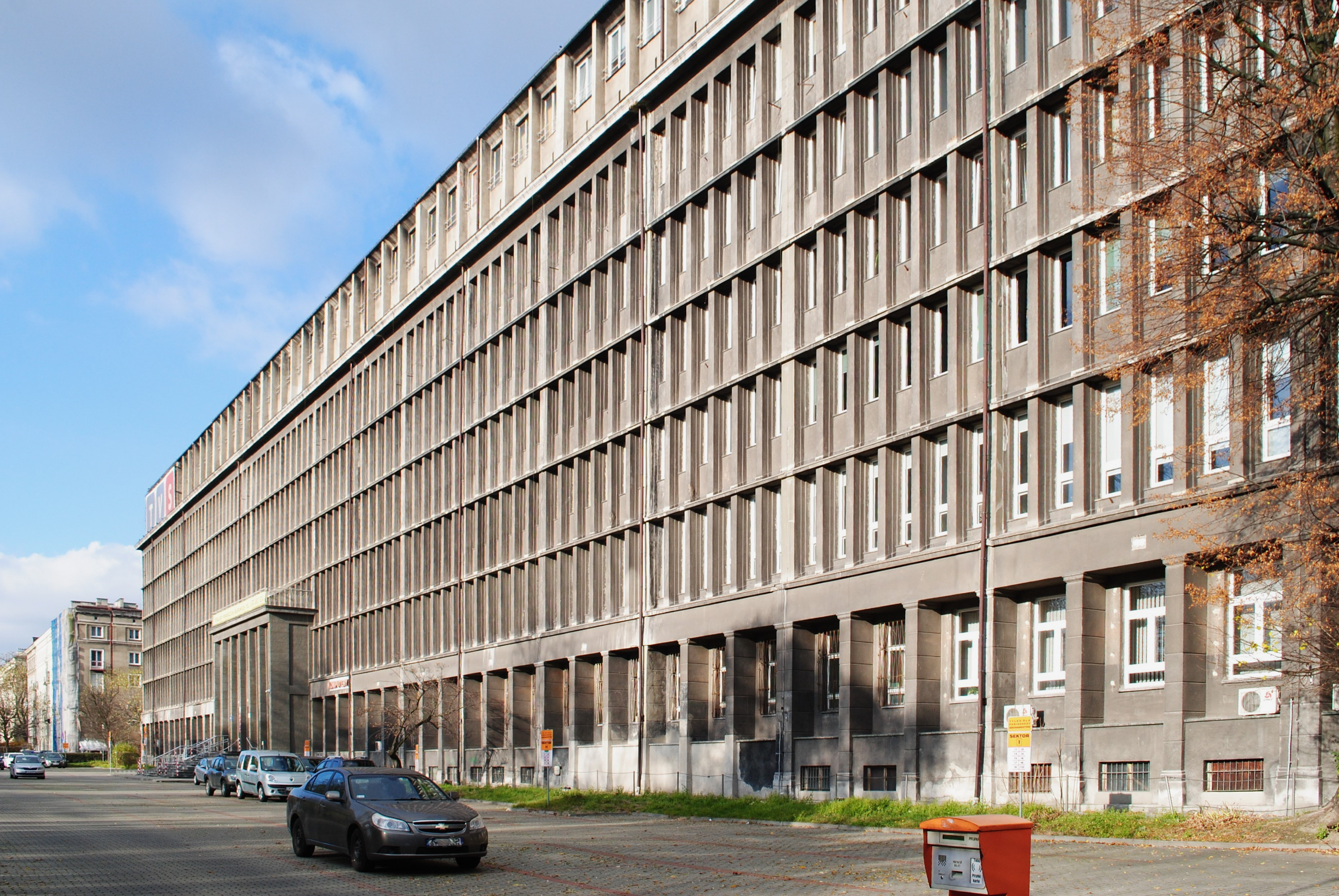
Building of the Coal Industry Studies and Design Office (8–10 Grunwaldzki Square) – seat of a number of public institutions of various types

District No. 12 Koszutka is one of 22 districts of Katowice, constituting an auxiliary unit of the gmina. It was established by a resolution of the Katowice City Council as local government unit No. 12 on 1 January 1992. According to Resolution No. XLVI/449/97 of the Katowice City Council of 29 September 1997, Koszutka is a statutory district within the group of downtown districts.

The current by-law of the district was established by Resolution No. XLI/902/21 of the Katowice City Council on 25 November 2021. In accordance with the provisions of the by-law, the district authorities are the District Council and the District Management Board. The District Council consists of 15 councilors elected for a five-year term. It is the decision-making body of the district, and its tasks include, among others, submitting requests from district residents to the authorities of the city of Katowice regarding the district's activities, initiating and organizing special celebrations, cultural, sports, and recreational events, issuing opinions on local initiatives, and submitting requests in matters concerning the city that affect the district. The District Management Board is the executive body of the district. The Chairman of the Management Board represents the district externally, and the tasks of the Management Board include accepting requests from district residents, organizing and coordinating social initiatives, informing residents about district matters, and preparing draft resolutions of the District Council.

Koszutka has a Council and a Management Board for District No. 12 Koszutka. It is based at 12 A. Słonimski Street. In June 2022, the council was chaired by Jarosław Gwizdak, while the Management Board was chaired by Adrian Szymura. During the 2015–2019 term, councilors and representatives of the Management Board took part in a series of informational and educational meetings and cultural events held in Koszutka. These included, among others: cooperation in the organization of Koszutka Days, participation in the unveiling of sculptures at the Artists' Gallery, organization of meetings with various institutions and specialists, events and celebrations, co-organization of the Neighborhood Picnic, and other activities for the benefit of the district.

Historically, Koszutka has undergone a number of administrative changes. The area of the present-day district consists of Koszutka, originally a hamlet of Bogucice, as well as a small part of the former Gmina Dąb. After the Napoleonic Wars, Oppeln was established in the Kingdom of Prussia, and in 1818, the borders of some counties were adjusted. At that time, the area of today's Koszutka was incorporated into the Bytom County. On 27 March 1873, Katowice became the capital of an independent county separated from the Bytom County, and Koszutka, among others, was incorporated into the borders of the new Katowice County. Koszutka was located in Gmina Bogucice. On 1 January 1913, part of Gmina Bogucice in the vicinity of the present-day Spodek, with an area of about 50 ha, was transferred to the manorial district of Katowice. In exchange, Gmina Bogucice gained plots of land in Zawodzie and the sum of 100,000 marks.

In 1922, after the incorporation of part of Upper Silesia into Poland, Koszutka was located in Gmina Bogucice in the Katowice County. Under an Act of the Silesian Parliament of 15 July 1924, it was decided to incorporate, among others, Gmina Bogucice, where Koszutka was located, into Katowice. This act came into force on 15 October of the same year. In 1954, Katowice was divided into three districts, with Koszutka being part of the Bogucice-Zawodzie district. This division was abolished in 1973.

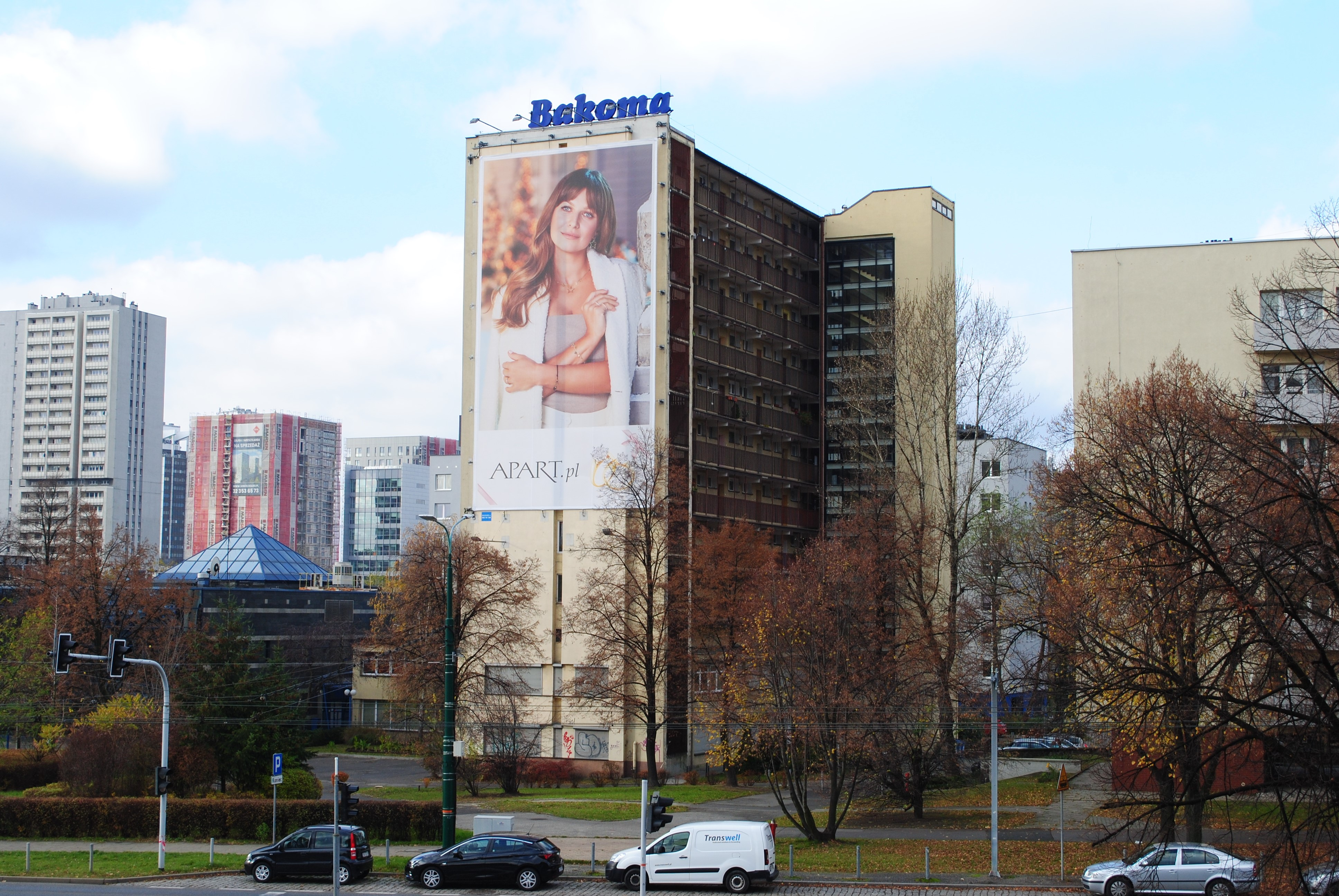
Building housing the seat of the Katowice Municipal Housing Management Company (5 M. Grażyński Street)

Due to Koszutka's proximity to Śródmieście, a number of metropolitan institutions are located in the district. Many of such institutions are concentrated in one place – the former building of the Coal Industry Studies and Design Office (8–10 Grunwaldzki Square). As of June 2022, the following institutions are located there:

- Wody Polskie State Water Management Authority. Catchment Board in Katowice (8–10 Grunwaldzki Square);
- All-Poland Alliance of Trade Unions. Council of Silesian Voivodeship (8–10 Grunwaldzki Square);
- Silesian Customs and Fiscal Office. Katowice branch (8–10 Grunwaldzki Square);
- State Fund for Rehabilitation of Disabled Persons. Silesian branch (8–10 Grunwaldzki Square).

As of June 2022, the following administrative offices operated in other parts of Koszutka:

- Katowice Housing Cooperative (35c Klonowa Street);
- Katowice Housing Cooperative. Centrum-I Estate Management (8 B. Czerwiński Street);
- Katowice Housing Cooperative. Wierzbowa Estate Management (50 Brzozowa Street);
- Katowice Municipal Housing Management Company (5 M. Grażyński Street);
- Regional Chamber of Audit (3 Grabowa Street);
- Silesian Property Management Authority (1a Grabowa Street);
- Energy Regulatory Office. Southern Regional Branch (65 Sokolska Street).

== Economy ==
The district is predominantly residential, with a relatively small share of service and office activities. As of 31 December 2013, there were 2,479 businesses registered in the REGON system with their headquarters in Koszutka, which at that time accounted for 5.4% of all businesses in Katowice, and 2,307 of them were micro-enterprises. At the end of 2013, there were 419 registered unemployed people from Koszutka – 3.7% of the district's residents, and 179 people were long-term unemployed.

Koszutka is home to a number of companies from various industries. As of June 2022, the following companies have their headquarters or branches there: the Central Mining Institute (1 Gwarków Square), the Studies, Design and Implementation Office ENERGOPROJEKT-KATOWICE (15 Jesionowa Street), the transport construction design firm TRAKT (9a Jesionowa Street), the thermal energy distributor TAURON Ciepło (49 M. Grażyński Street), the Katowice office of rail freight carrier CD Cargo Poland (2 Grabowa Street), and the Katowice office of software producer Asseco (83a W. Korfanty Avenue).

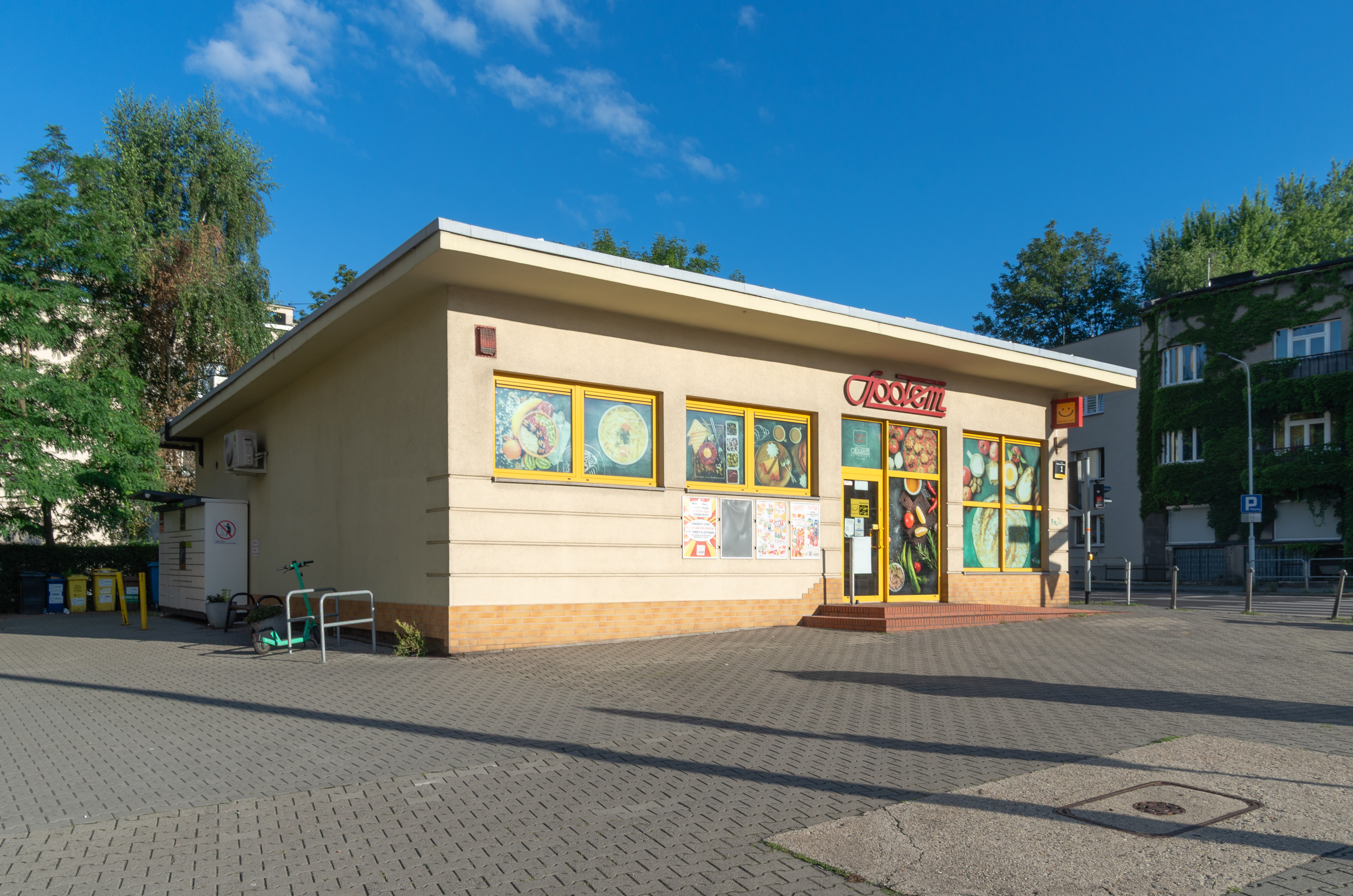
Społem Katowice store on 1 Misjonarzy Oblatów MN Street

The local commercial and service center of Koszutka is located in the area of Grunwaldzki Square. This center is a distinct, centrally located square, while services are located over a larger area. This space includes commercial and educational facilities, green areas, and public transport stops. There are no shopping centers in Koszutka, but there are discount stores and supermarkets, such as Społem Katowice at 5a Chorzowska Street and 1 Misjonarzy Oblatów MN Street, and Rabat at 76 Sokolska Street. A covered market with food and industrial goods is located at 61 Katowicka Street and is managed by the Municipal Market Authority. A branch of Polish Post in Koszutka is located at 1 G. Morcinek Street.

In the past, the Belle-Alliance Coal Mine operated in Koszutka; it was opened on 16 January 1838 (or 1 February 1838). It operated between 1844 and 1849 and was owned by Franz von Winckler, Aleksander Mieroszewski, and Albert von Sallawa. In 1839, it was taken over by Franz von Winckler and his wife Maria. The mine reached its maximum output in 1847, supplying 1,700 tons of coal to the market. On 25 November 1885, the Belle-Alliance and Belle-Alliance II mining fields, along with several others, were incorporated into the consolidated Ferdinand Coal Mine (later the Katowice Coal Mine).

The Bülow shaft of the Waterloo mine was located within the boundaries of Koszutka. In June 1885, this shaft reached a depth of 180 meters, and coal mining at this level began in 1890. The shaft complex included a boiler room, a forge, a railway siding, a sorting plant, warehouses, a marking facility, and a powder magazine. Damage to the shaft on 8 May 1897 led the North Katowice District Mining Authority to issue a decision on 20 May of the same year to suspend mining at the Waterloo mine. The Bülow shaft was filled in May 1906, and in its place, in the area of J. N. Stęślicki Street and Kazimiera Iłłakowiczówna Street garages were built in the 1950s.

The Heinrich shaft (later Henryk) also operated in Koszutka. It was a ventilation shaft for the Ferdinand Coal Mine (later the Katowice Coal Mine), built in 1880. Between 1900 and 1907, it was deepened to 192 meters, and later to 280.5 meters.

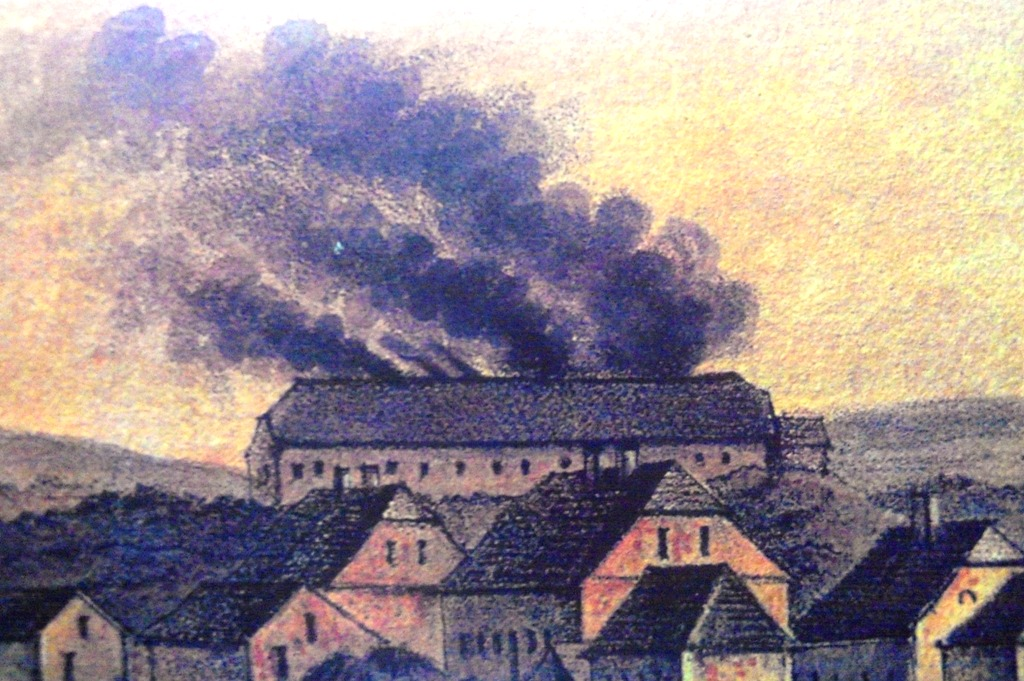
Smoke over the Fanny Zinc Smelter – a lithograph by Ernest Knippel from the mid-19th century

In the area of the present-day Spodek, the Fanny Zinc Smelter was opened on 20 November 1822 (or established in 1820), while the Franz Zinc Smelter was established likely between 1850 and 1855 (or in 1818) by Franz von Winckler. In 1860, it was merged with the neighboring Fanny smelter, retaining the latter's name. The facility was shut down on 30 September 1903, because its then owner, Hugo zu Hohenlohe-Öhringen, owned a modern Hohenlohe plant in Wełnowiec and had no need of it. The remaining buildings were used to store wood and as a metallurgical plant, known as "Maria's Court". The complex served various purposes, and after World War II, it housed workshops and warehouses for local businesses, as well as the headquarters of the Municipal Cleaning Company. In the 1960s, the complex was demolished in connection with the construction of the Spodek arena.

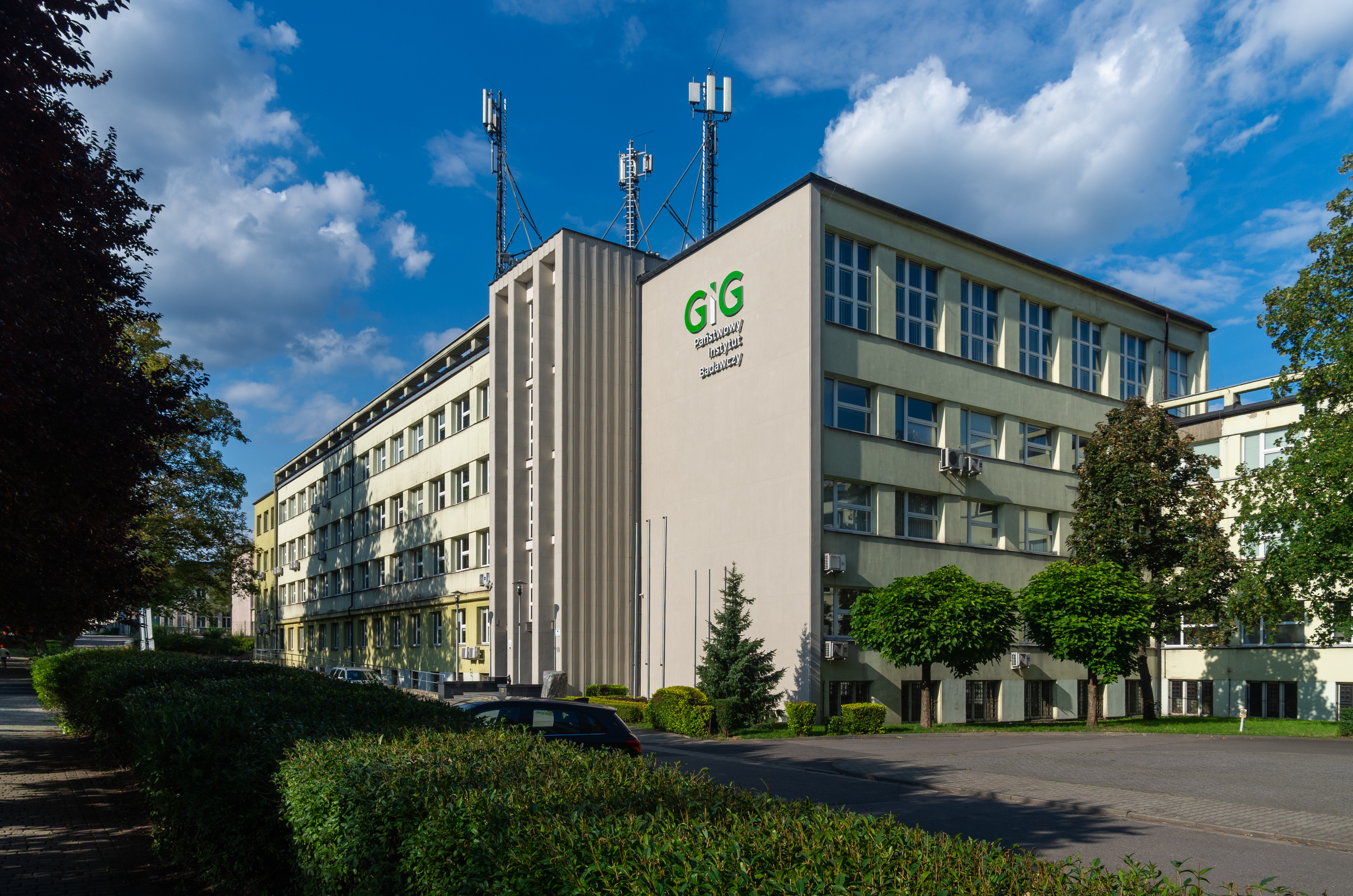
Seat of the Central Mining Institute at 1 Gwarków Square

On 16 April 1945, the Scientific Research Institute of the Coal Industry was established; from 1950, it operated under the name Central Mining Institute. As early as 1948, the company moved to its current headquarters at 1 Gwarków Square. Between 1954 and 1963, the Central Mining Institute was expanded with additional halls, workshops, and laboratories, and in 1971, a 13-story skyscraper was put into use by the institute. From the very beginning, its activities have focused on issues related to occupational safety, the development of modern technologies in mining, and environmental protection, in particular against the negative effects of mining activities.

On 23 August 1949, the Katowice office was established as a branch of the headquarters of the ENERGOPROJEKT Energy Design Office in Warsaw, and in 1953, the Katowice Thermal Power Plant Design Office was established as a branch of the Energy Design Office Management Board. The office, located for many years at Piotr Skarga Street, moved its headquarters to Koszutka in 1979. Throughout its history, the office has participated in the design of a number of power plants and combined heat and power plants, both in Poland and abroad, including Prunéřov in the Czech Republic.

At the end of 1949, the Central Coal Construction Management Board was established in Katowice, which consolidated companies involved in the construction of new mines. The company had its headquarters in a building constructed during that period at Grunwaldzki Square. A year later, the company underwent a reorganization, which resulted in the creation of a number of specialized plants working for the mining industry.

During the expansion of tKoszutka in the 1950s, it was decided that commercial and service establishments should not be located on the ground floors of residential buildings, but in single-story or two-story pavilions facing the main thoroughfares – in this case, along today's W. Korfanty Avenue and Chorzowska Street.

== Technical infrastructure ==
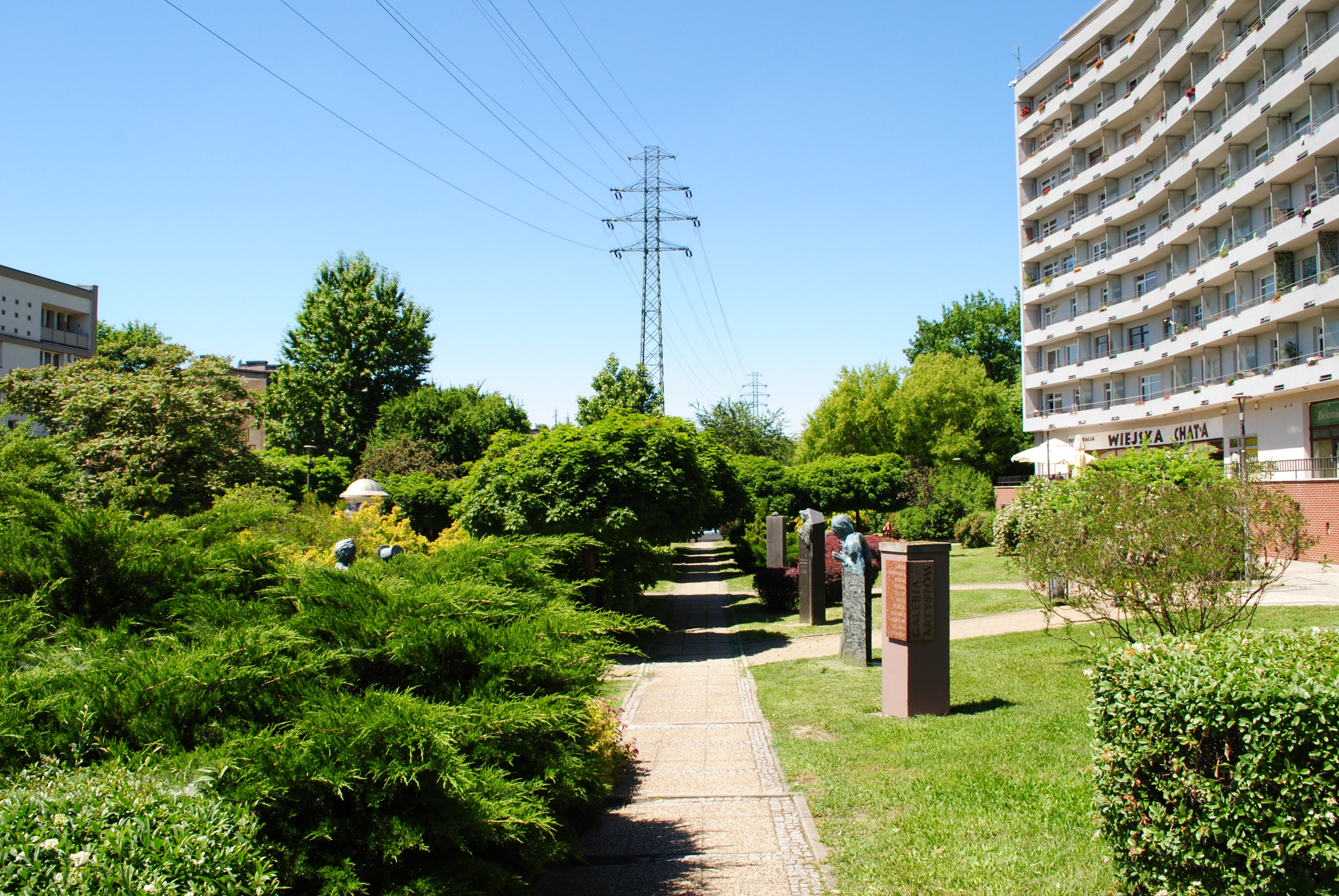
Part of Grunwaldzki Square on the eastern side; above it runs the 110 kV power network

Koszutka is supplied with running water from the Mikołów and Murcki network reservoirs. They are fed from water treatment plants in Dziećkowice, Goczałkowice-Zdrój, and Kobiernice. The water is pumped into the shared distribution system of the Upper Silesian Water Supply Company, from where it is supplied to Koszutka, among other places, via a system of water mains and the associated distribution network of Katowice Waterworks. A 600 mm diameter Upper Silesian Water Supply Company's transit water main runs through the district between Bytków and Koszutka. in Koszutka, this main runs along W. Korfanty Avenue, J. N. Stęślicki Street, Grunwaldzki Square, and Katowicka Street. The average water consumption in Katowice in 2012 was 36.3 m³ per person.

The first water supply network in the district was built along the existing road connecting Alfred colony with Katowice via Wełnowiec and Koszutka between 1895 and 1897. The section between Alfred colony and Katowice was made of cast iron pipes with a diameter of 350/300 mm. This water supply system was connected to the flooded Rozalia Ore Mine in Dąbrówka Wielka, which the city of Katowice, together with other gminas of the Katowice County, purchased under an agreement dated 25 March 1895. The supply of Triassic water from Dąbrówka Wielka began on 1 January 1896.

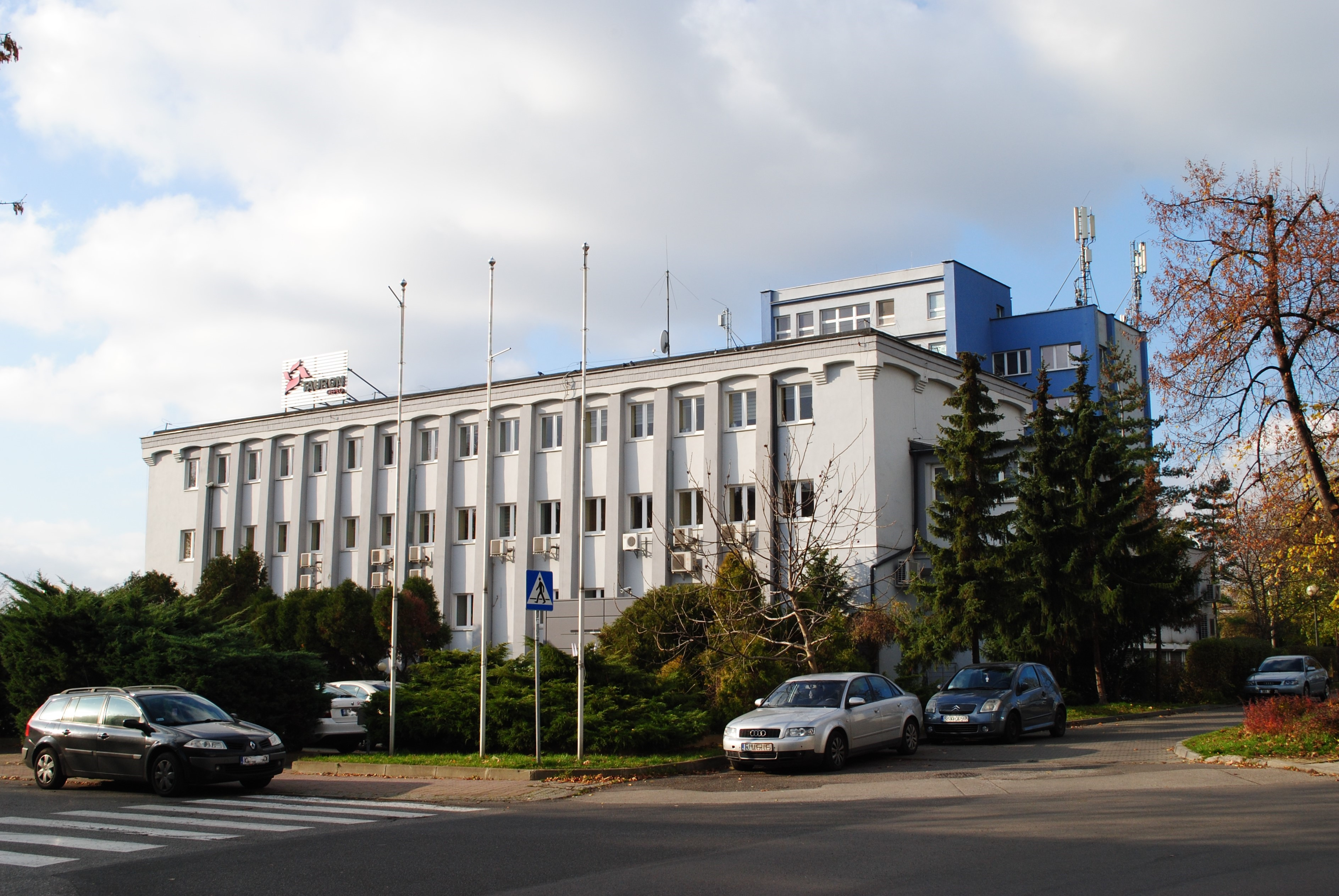
Seat of TAURON Ciepło (49 M. Grażyński Street)

The sanitary and combined sewerage system in the district is operated by the Sewerage Network Operation Department – Center, which belongs to Katowice Waterworks. The northern part of the city, including Koszutka, lies in the catchment area of the Gigablok sewage treatment plant, whose treated sewage is discharged into the Rawa river. The storm water drainage system is managed by the Municipal Road and Bridge Authority. The main storm water drainage collectors in Koszutka run along Sokolska, K. Iłłakowiczówna, Misjonarzy Oblatów MN, Katowicka, and Grabowa streets.

The district is supplied with electricity via a 110 kV high-voltage network connected to nearby power plants. One 110 kV electrical grid line runs through Koszutka on the Brynów–Torkat/Katowice–Dąb route, passing above ground through A. Budniok Park, G. Holoubek Square, and Grunwaldzki Square, and then continues underground parallel to Olimpijska Street.

Thermal energy is supplied to Koszutka by the former Katowice Heat and Power Plant (now the Katowice Power Station), operated by TAURON Ciepło. The company's headquarters are located at 49 M. Grażyński Street.

== Transport ==
=== Road transport ===
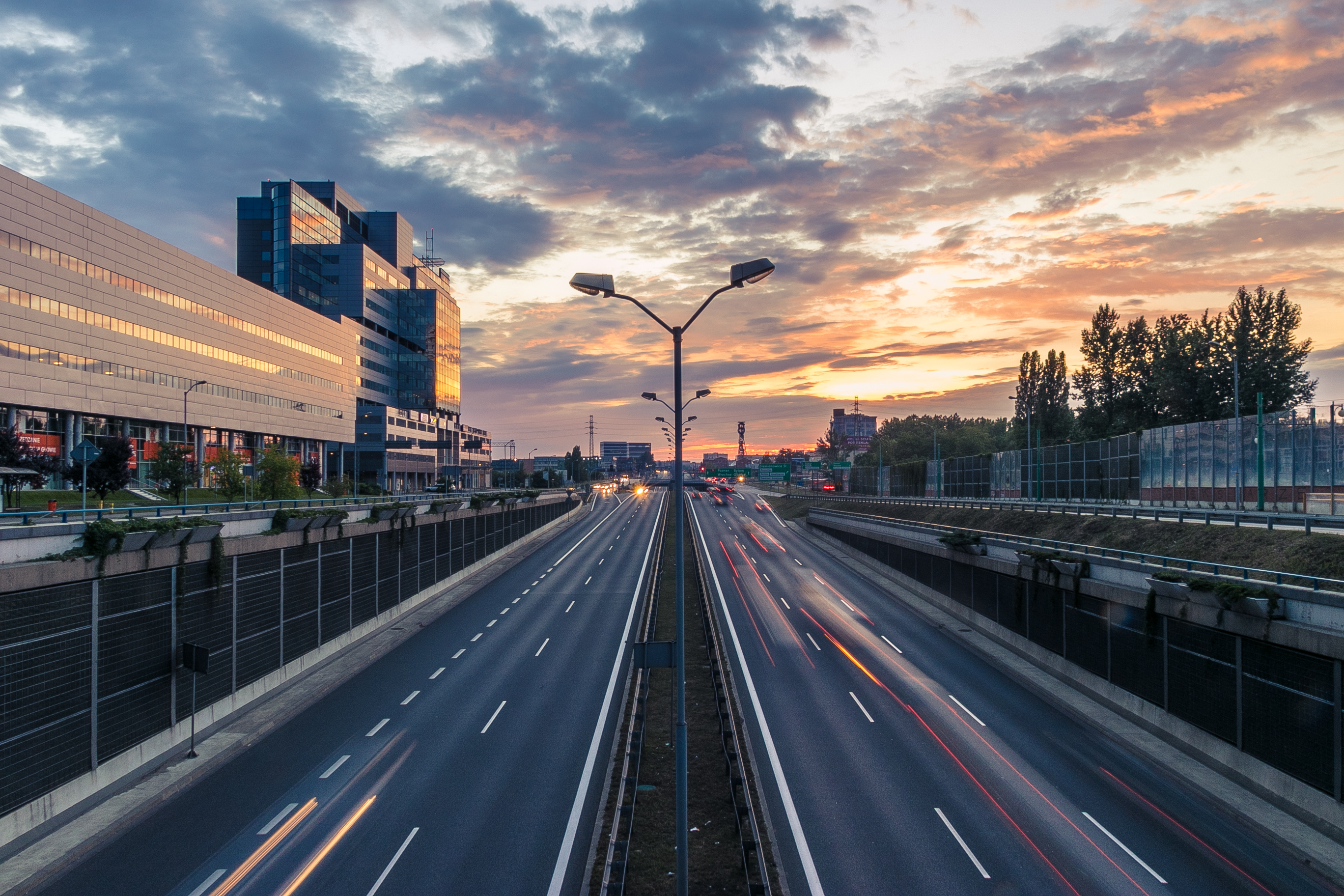
Chorzowska Street at the junction with Sokolska Street

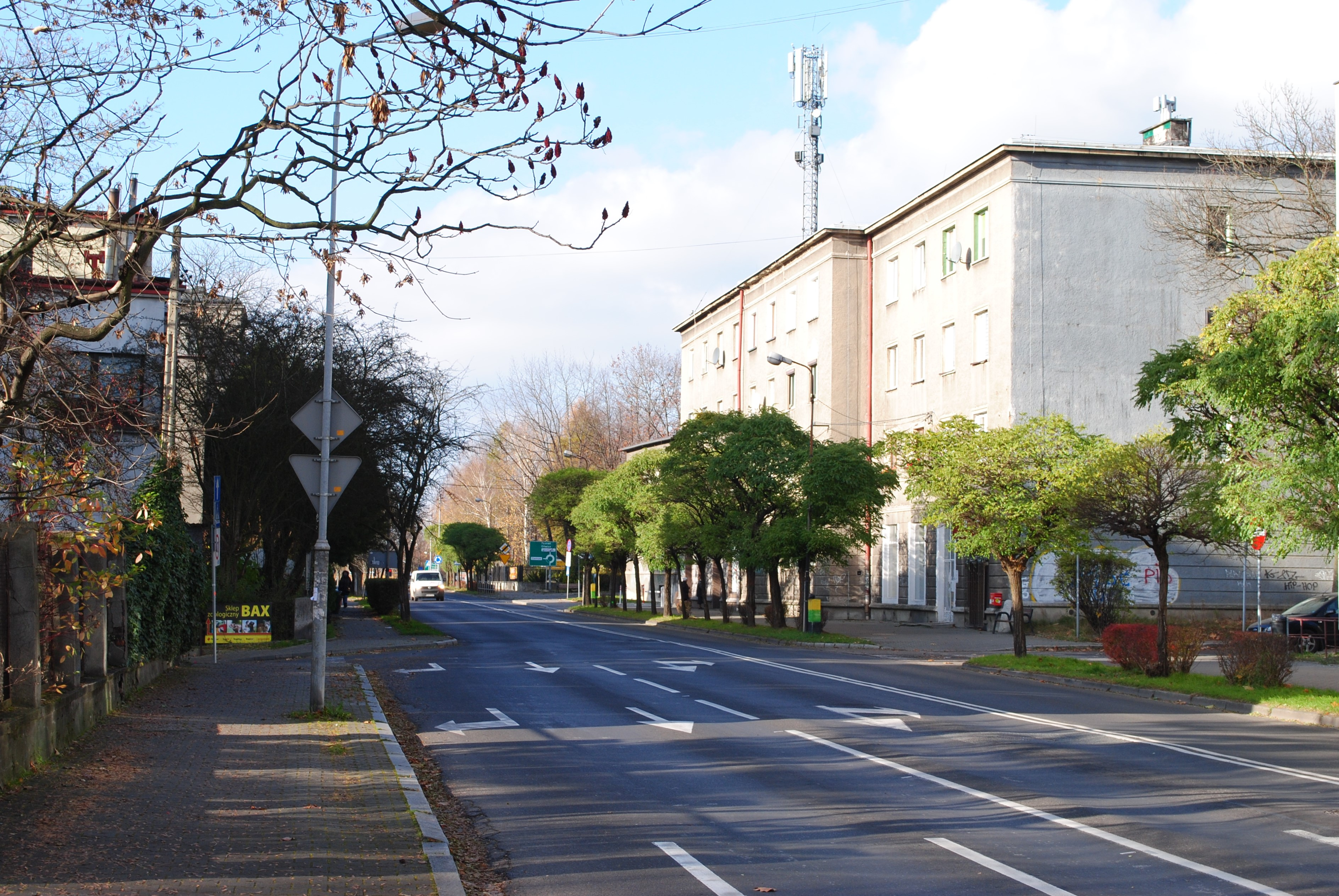
Misjonarzy Oblatów MN Street

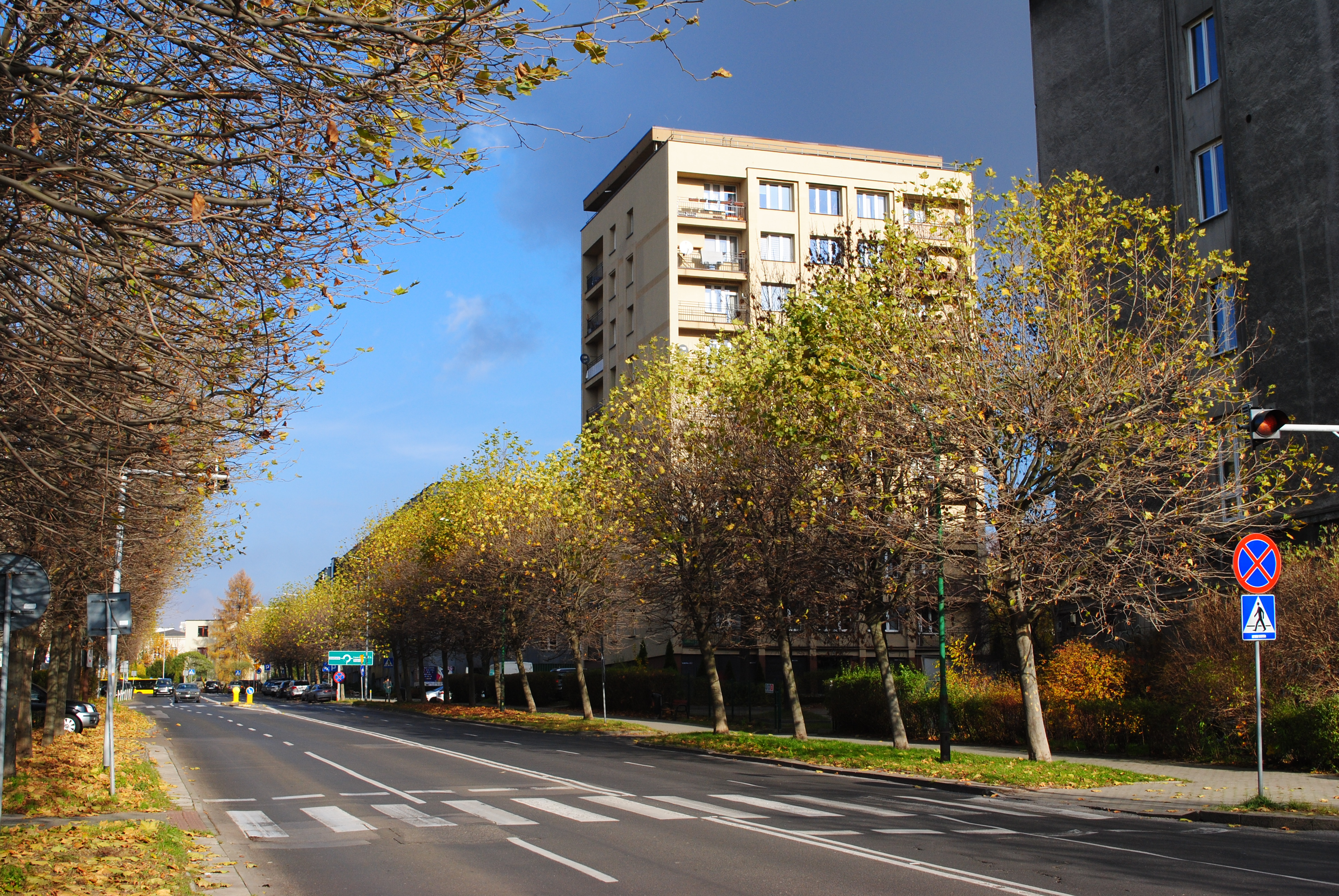
Koszutka section of Sokolska Street

One national road runs through Koszutka:

- National road No. 79 (Walenty Roździeński Avenue and Chorzowska Street) – a series of two roads, which are among the most important in Katowice. Both streets are part of national road No. 79, while Chorzowska Street, between J. Ziętek Square and the Orlęta Lwowskie Overpass above Bracka Street, is also part of Drogowa Trasa Średnicowa. Chorzowska Street is one of the most important roads in Katowice, with a length of 4.8 km, connecting Koszutka with Chorzów in the west, and in the east with the Bagienna junction, from where the cities of the Dąbrowa Basin can be reached, while in the opposite direction are Tychy along national road No. 86, and national road No. 79 leading to Mysłowice and Jaworzno.

The following roads are among the most important streets in terms of traffic within the district:

- Wojciech Korfanty Avenue – one of the most important and longest roads in Katowice, with a length of 3.9 km. It connects Koszutka with Śródmieście to the south, and with Wełnowiec-Józefowiec and further with the city of Siemianowice Śląskie to the north. It is a two-way road with two lanes in each direction, and between them, on the Koszutka section of the avenue, there is a tram line. W. Korfanty Avenue is a distributor county road;
- Jerzy Ziętek Square – a roundabout in the very center of Katowice, from which W. Roździeński Avenue and Chorzowska Street begin, and which also intersects W. Korfanty Avenue meridionally. It serves as an important transport hub for the entire city of Katowice, with the main transit traffic passing through a tunnel located under the roundabout;
- Kazimiera Iłłakowiczówna Street – a street in the north-western part of Koszutka. It is a local county road, and a meridian route connecting Koszutka with Wełnowiec-Józefowiec in the north;
- Katowicka Street – a street with a length of approximately 1010 meters, connecting Koszutka with Bogucice. It is a parallel road, ending at the intersection with W. Korfanty Avenue and Misjonarzy Oblatów MN Street. It is a distributor county road;
- Misjonarzy Oblatów MN Street – a street stretching entirely within Koszutka, approximately 500 meters long and running parallel to the equator. It is an extension of Katowicka Street to the west, and at the bend, the road changes its name to J.N. Stęślicki Street. It is a distributor county road;
- Sokolska Street – a street with a length of 1.3 km, connecting Koszutka with the western part of Śródmieście, running in a meridional direction. It is a distributor county road;
- Jan Nepomucen Stęślicki Street – a border road between Dąb (west of the road) and Koszutka (east). It runs meridionally and connects Koszutka from the west with Chorzowska Street. Its extension is F. W. Grundmann Street, which connects Koszutka with Śródmieście and Załęże. It is a main county road.

In terms of connections between individual macro-regions, access from Koszutka and Józefowiec to other parts of Katowice was rated the worst, especially to the south-western districts, which can be reached from Koszutka and Józefowiec along lower-class streets running through Śródmieście (including F. W. Grundmann and Sokolska streets), which are very often congested. Koszutka has the best transport links with Bogucice and Pniaki, and good links with Murcki, Giszowiec, Nikiszowiec, Szopienice, and Załęże.

A significant problem in Koszutka is the insufficient number of parking spaces, and, as a residential area from the 1950s and 1960s, the district is not prepared in terms of the existing transport system of the city to handle the growing number of cars. When designing the expansion of Osiedle Juliana Marchlewskiego in the 1950s, the principle of one car per 67 people was adopted, and with the estimated number of residents, a total of 270 parking spaces in garages were designed.

=== Rail transport ===
The beginnings of the rail transport in Koszutka date back to 1859, when a system of railways connecting Katowice with industrial plants in Dąb, Bogucice, and Wełnowiec was established. In Koszutka, the railway tracks ran along today's J. N. Stęślicki Street (the track towards Wełnowiec and Dąbrówka Mała) and through the later "Blue Blocks" parallel to Chorzowska Street (to the later Katowice Coal Mine in Bogucice). The track connecting with the Katowice Coal Mine through the "Blue Blocks" was dismantled in 1968, while the track running parallel to the present-day J. N. Stęślicki Street on the border between Dąb and Koszutka was closed in 1992. The railways running through the district were used exclusively by freight trains.

There was also a network of narrow-gauge railways with a track gauge of 785 mm operating in Koszutka. The Upper Silesian Narrow-Gauge Railway line No. 4015 ran there, connecting Paulina (the area of Chemiczna Street in Siemianowice Śląskie), Katowice Wąskotorowe (in the area of the junction of M. Grażyński and B. Czerwiński streets), and the Gottwald Coal Mine. This 2.566 km long railway was put into service in 1869 and was closed on 31 March 1960, on the same day as the Katowice Wąskotorowe station. This was related to the reconstruction of the track layout around the Katowice Coal Mine, which took place between 1958 and 1962 due to the expansion of this part of the city. At that time, the direction of railway service to the mine was changed from west to east.

There is currently no railway network in Koszutka, and the nearest railway station is Katowice railway station, located in Śródmieście, approximately 2.5 km away.

=== Bicycle transport ===
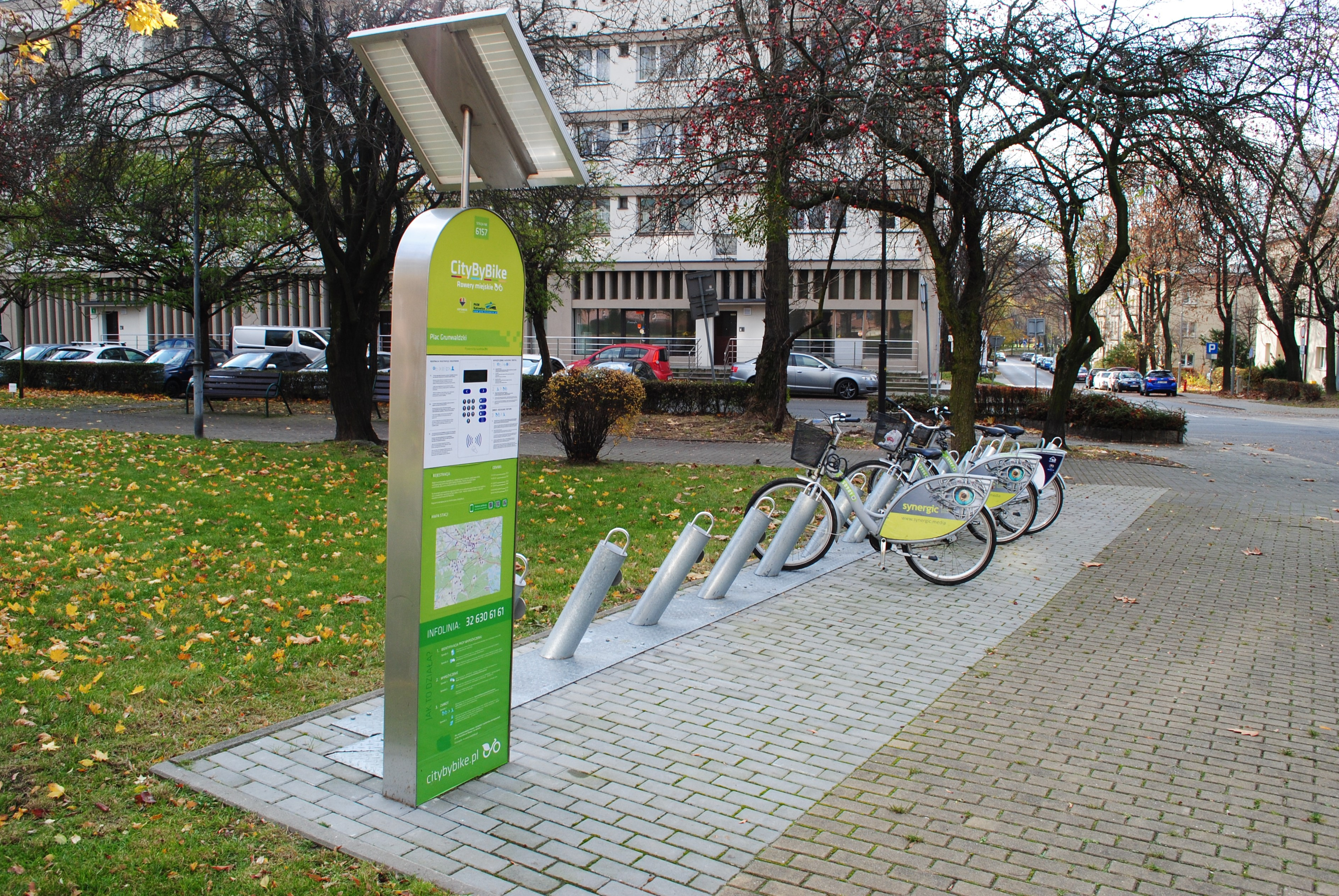
City by bike station No. 6157 Plac Grunwaldzki (2020)

The bicycle infrastructure network in Koszutka is concentrated in the southern part of the district. According to the target bicycle path network published by the Katowice City Hall as of mid-2022, this network was almost fully developed – the only missing section was the route along the extension of J. N. Stęślicki Street. All bicycle routes in the district are intended for transport purposes. However, there are no bicycle routes established as part of the "Cycling through Silesia" project.

In mid-2022, the following types of bicycle paths existed in Koszutka:

- Bicycle paths – J. N. Stęślicki and Olimpijska streets (eastern side of the road), and a section of the path along Chorzowska Street and the road along W. Roździeński Avenue near the .KTW skyscrapers;
- Pedestrian-bicycle paths – along Chorzowska and S. Skrzypek streets;
- Routes with permitted traffic on the sidewalk – A. Budniok Park, W. Korfanty Avenue between J. Ziętek Square and the intersection with Katowicka and Misjonarzy Oblatów MN streets (on both sides of the avenue), routes in the area of J. Ziętek Square, and the route in the Culture Zone between the International Congress Center and Bogucice Park via the footbridge over Olimpijska Street.

Koszutka also has part of the city's bike rental network, Metrorower, which replaced the City by bike system. As of June 2022, the following City by bike stations were operating in Koszutka:

- 5858 Koszutka – Plac Gwarków (12 stands);
- 5881 Chorzowska – Park Budnioka (13 stands);
- 6017 Rondo gen. J. Ziętka (12 stands);
- 6157 Plac Grunwaldzki (12 stands);
- 7266 Spodek (12 stands);
- 7269 Boisko 'Rapid' (12 stands).

=== Urban public transport ===
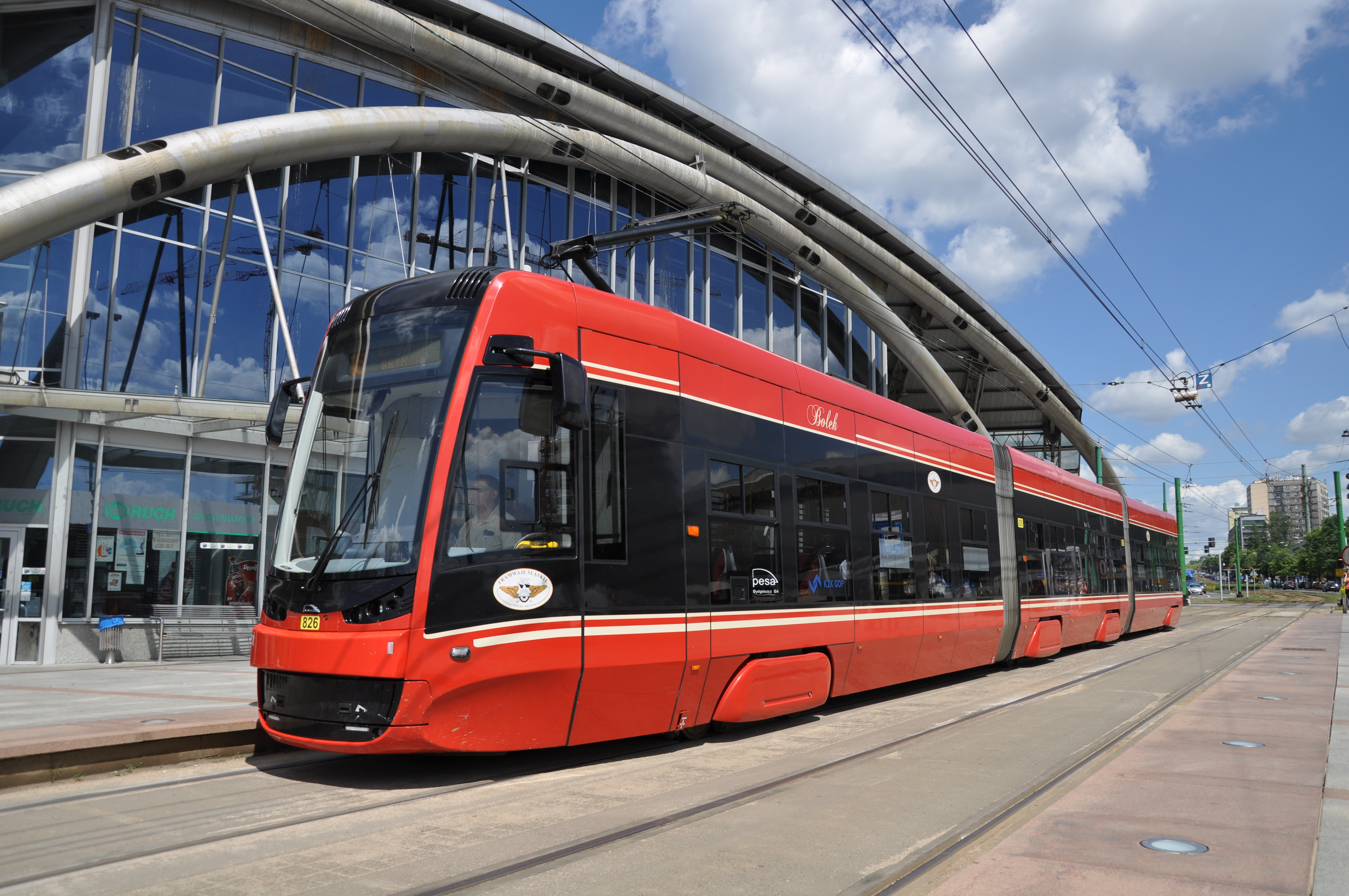
Pesa Twist 2012N tram at the Katowice Rondo stop

The organizer of public transport in Koszutka is the Metropolitan Transport Authority, which took over the responsibilities from the previous organizers on 1 January 2019. Public transport within the district is provided both in the form of bus connections and, on behalf of the Metropolitan Transport Authority, by the company Tramwaje Śląskie using trams.

As of June 2022, there are a total of 10 stops in Koszutka: Koszutka GIG, Koszutka Iłłakowiczówny, Koszutka Jesionowa, Koszutka Katowicka, Koszutka Kino Kosmos, Koszutka Kościół, Koszutka Misjonarzy Oblatów, Koszutka Morcinka, Koszutka Słoneczna, and Koszutka Słoneczna Pętla. In addition, the following stops are located within the district boundaries: Dąb Widok (on J. N. Stęślicki Street; northbound stop), Katowice Chorzowska (stops on Sokolska Street), Katowice Rondo, Katowice Sokolska (tram stop only), and Katowice Stęślickiego.

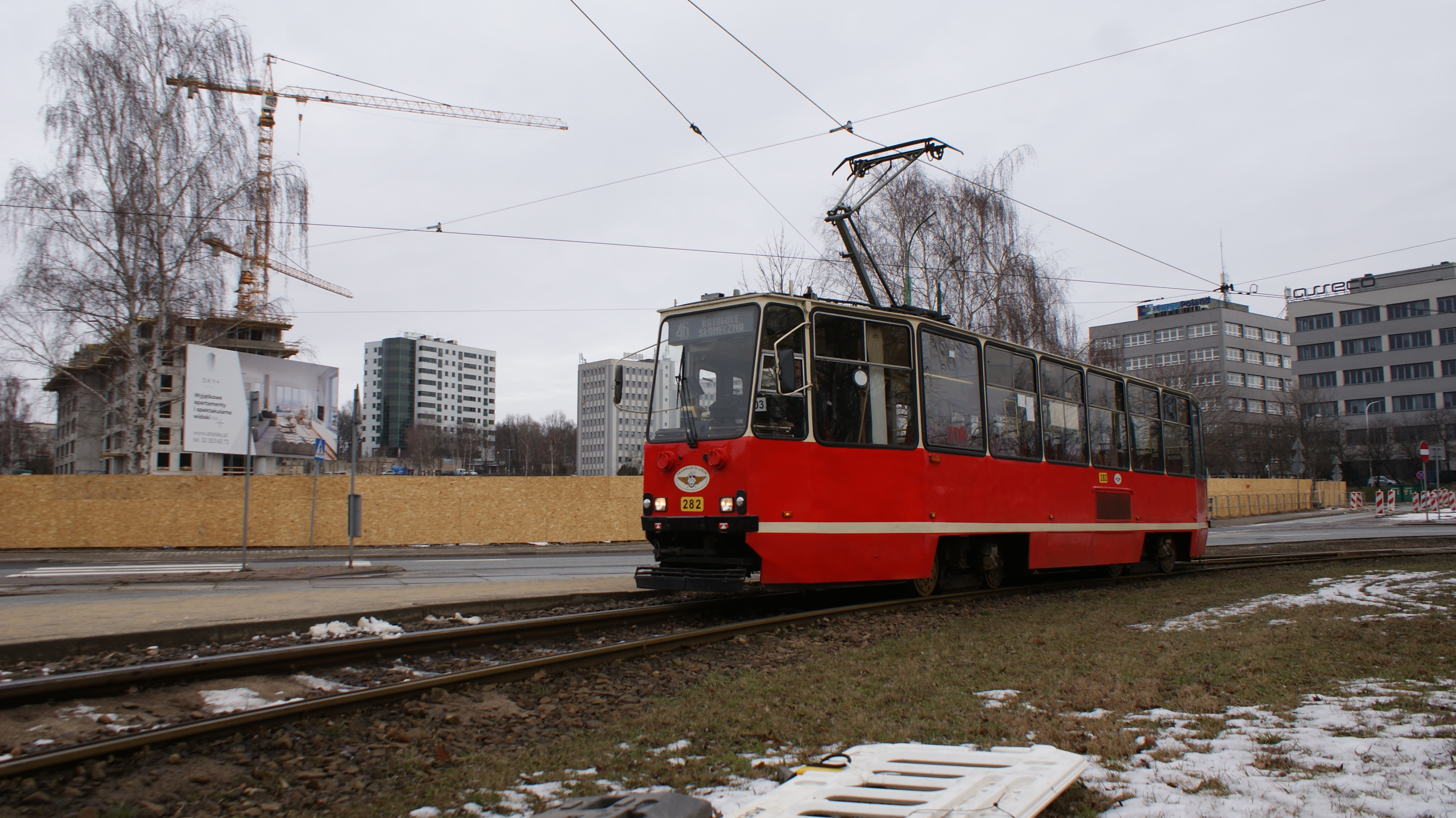
Konstal 105Na tram at the Słoneczna tram terminus

Koszutka Słoneczna is one of the busiest stops, with passenger traffic exceeding 700 people per hour. In June 2022, this stop was regularly used by 11 bus lines (including one metropolitan line – M28, connecting Katowice with Piekary Śląskie via Siemianowice Śląskie), as well as 4 tram lines: 13, 16, 43, and 46. Bus and tram lines connect this part of the district with various parts of Katowice (including Bogucice, Brynów-Osiedle Zgrzebnioka, Dąbrówka Mała, Dąb, Giszowiec, Janów-Nikiszowiec, Osiedle Tysiąclecia, Osiedle Witosa, Szopienice-Burowiec, Śródmieście, Wełnowiec-Józefowiec, and Załęże), as well as with some other gminas of Metropolis GZM (including Będzin, Chorzów, Czeladź, Dąbrowa Górnicza, and Tarnowskie Góry).

The origins of the tram network in Koszutka date back to the end of the 19th century, when the Berlin-based company Kramer & Co. applied for a concession to build a narrow-gauge steam tram line connecting Królewska Huta, Dąb, Koszutka, Wełnowiec, and Huta Laura. Shortly after obtaining the concession, on 23 March 1896, the first section, Huta Marta (at the current J. Ziętek Square) to Huta Laura, was completed and put into operation on 30 December 1896. Soon after, the line was electrified.

During World War II, on 24 December 1940, the line between Katowice, Koszutka, Dąb, and the Chorzów Market Square was put into service after being converted to standard gauge, and in the autumn of the same year, work was underway on the conversion of the line to Siemianowice Śląskie. Further investments in tram lines continued after World War II. In 1964, a second track was built between the center of Katowice and the Słoneczna terminus, along with the tram terminus itself, and between 2000 and 2001, the Katowice–Chorzów–Bytom route running through Koszutka was modernized.

== Architecture and urban planning ==
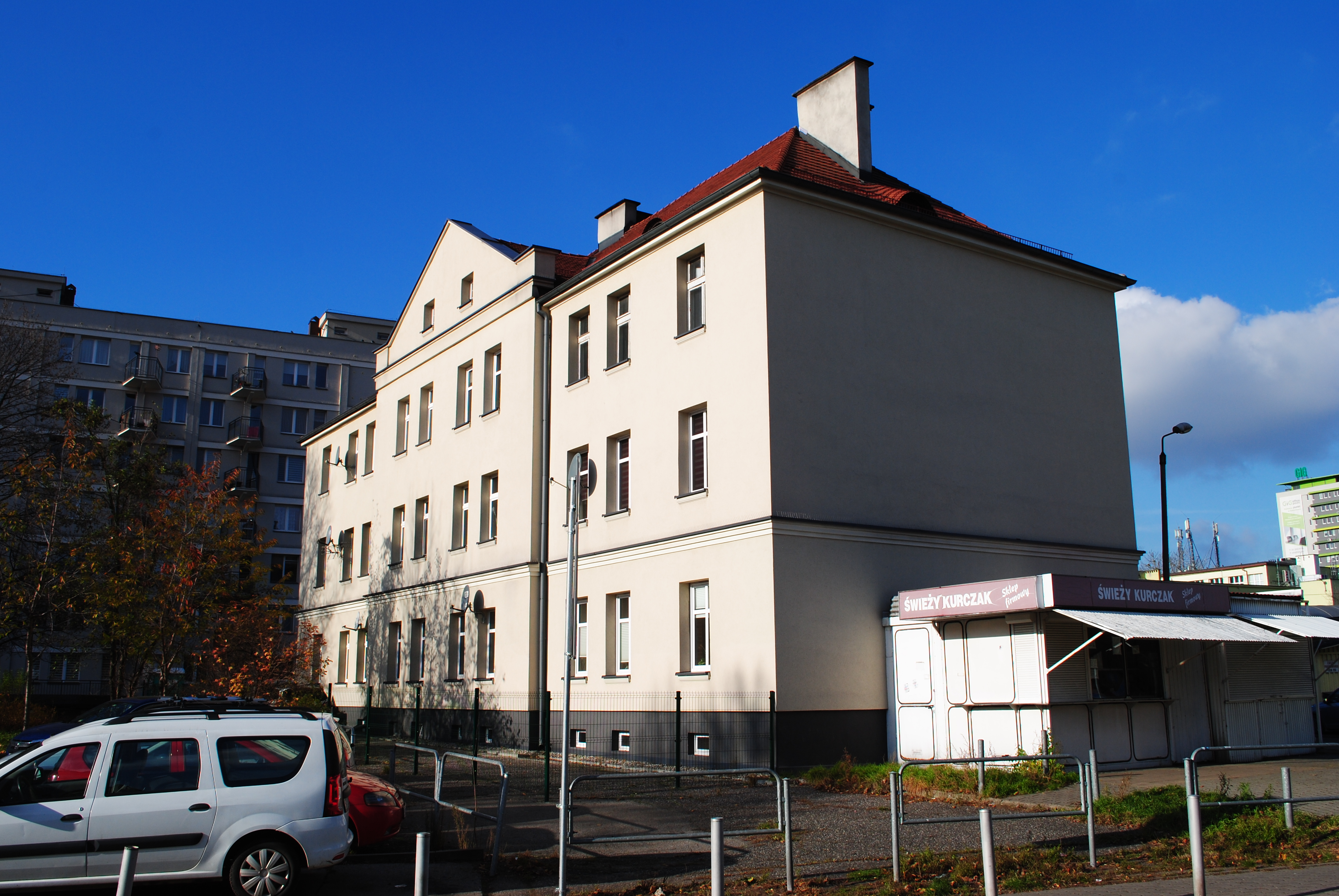
Building at 8/8a J. Ordon Street from 1929, built on the commission of the State Railways Directorate

The present-day buildings and the entire urban layout of Koszutka were mostly developed in the 20th century, mainly during the Polish People's Republic. Significant architectural and urban development in Koszutka began in the 19th century thanks to industrial growth, but it was limited to a small area. The modern district then became an area where single-family workers' houses and familoks were built. No buildings dating from before 1922 have survived within the district's boundaries to the present day.

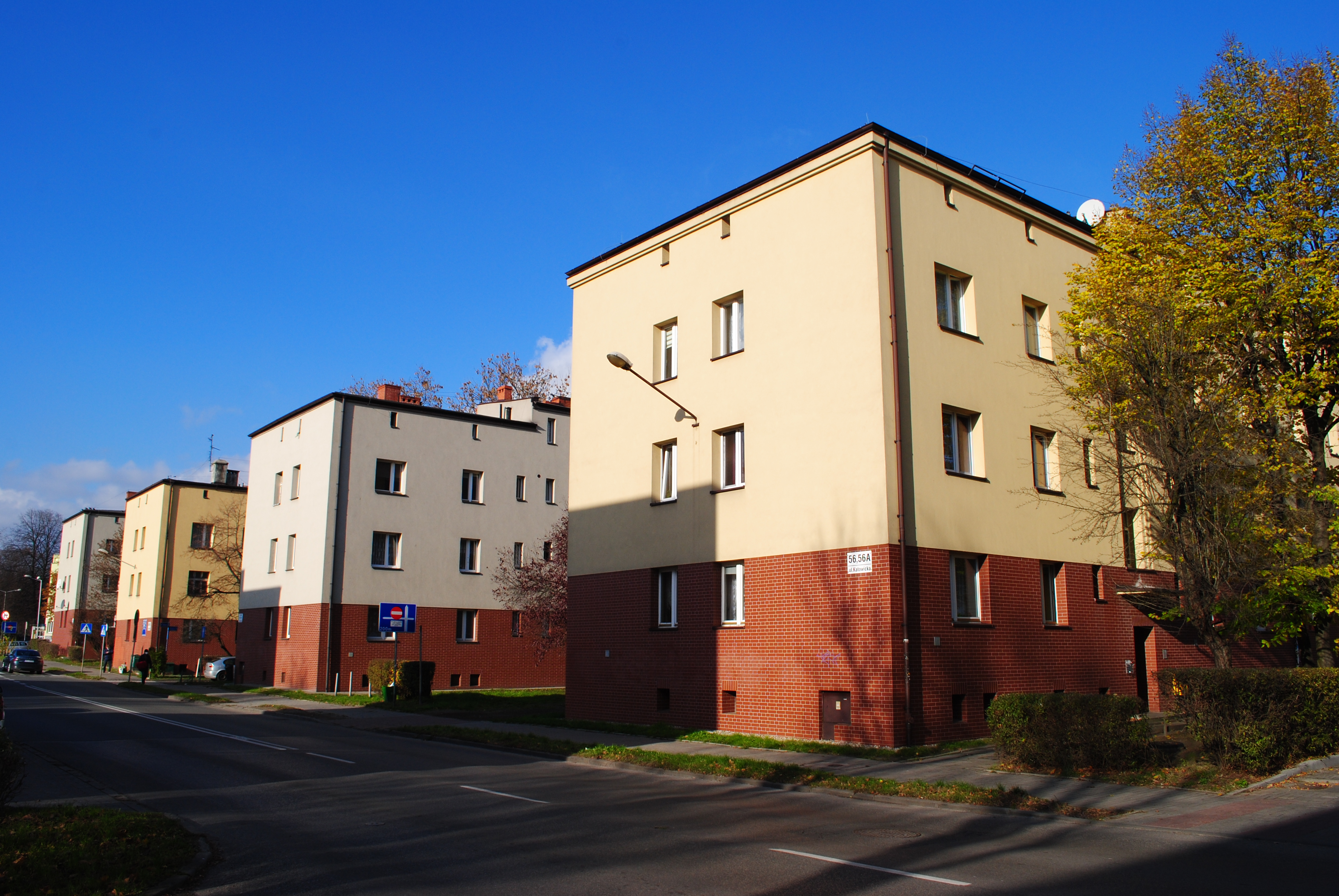
Buildings on Katowicka Street on the boundary of Koszutka and Bogucice, from the 1930s

In the 1930s, buildings were constructed mainly in the eastern part of Koszutka. As early as 1929, a building at 8/8a J. Ordon Street was put into use. It is a house for 12 families, built on behalf of the State Railways Directorate. Next to it was a smaller building, demolished in the 1960s. By 1936, apartment buildings had been built at 31, 33, 35, 37, and 39 Katowicka Street (117 apartments) and at 56–58 and 60 Katowicka Street (72 apartments). The buildings along W. Korfanty Avenue at the intersection with Misjonarzy Oblatów MN Street also date back to the interwar period. Many residential houses were built, and their architecture includes elements of cubism. Villas in the International Style are located, among others, at 5, 7, 9, 11, 17a, 20, and 21 Misjonarzy Oblatów MN Street and 1 J. Ordon Street (which initiated the expansion along the street). Houses from the interwar period are also located at: 11 K. Iłłakowiczówna Street, 2 and 8 A. Górnik Street, 2 and 9 S. Wyszyński Street, 9 and 23 Topolowa Street, 18 Klonowa Street, 17 Wierzbowa Street, and 18 Brzozowa Street.

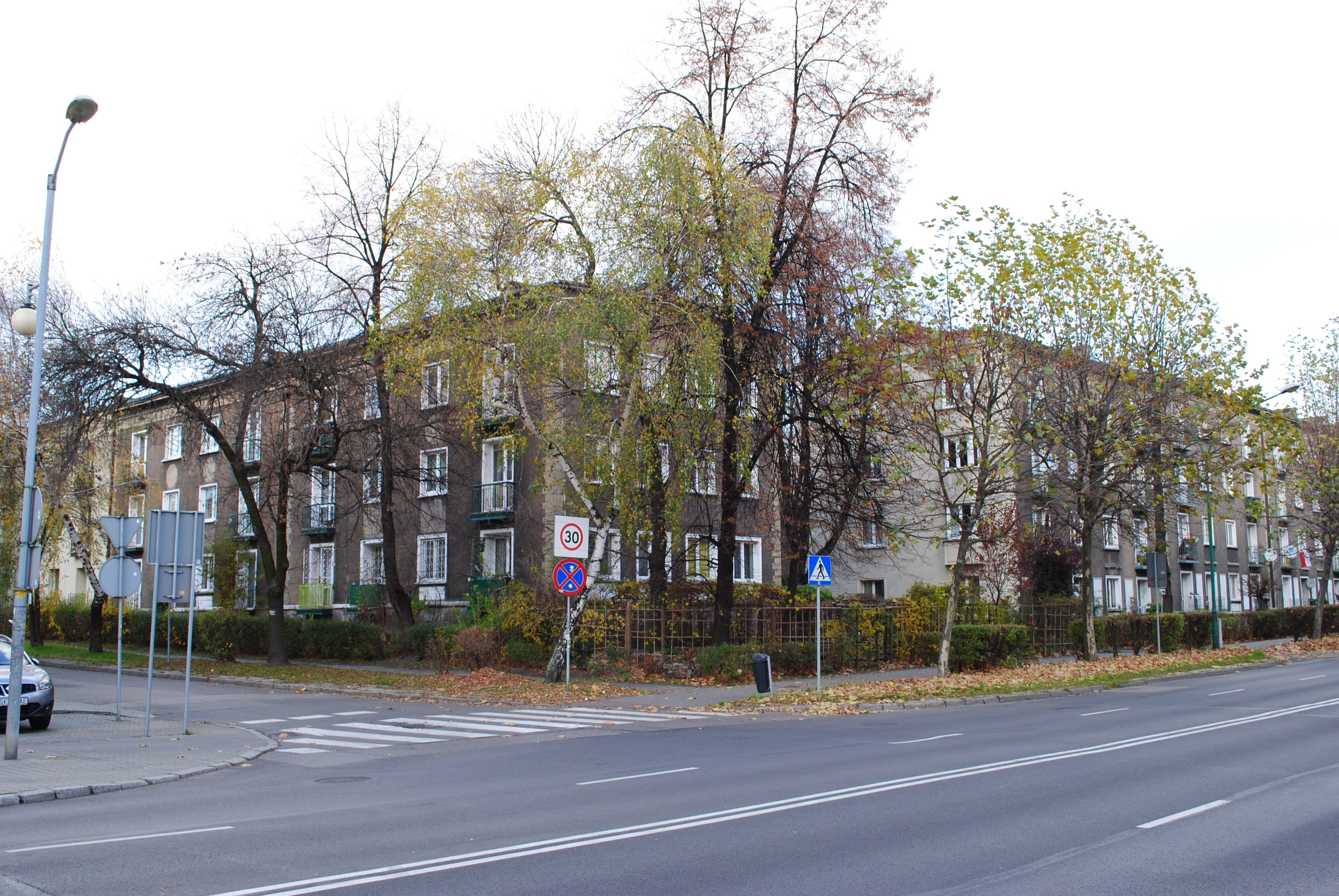
Part of the former Osiedle Juliana Marchlewskiego – buildings at the junction of Sokolska Street and M. Grażyński Street

Koszutka underwent significant development in the 1950s, when Osiedle Juliana Marchlewskiego was built. It was constructed on the site of former barracks, rural cottages, and familoks, with the last remnants of the district's rural buildings concentrated in the area of Wełnowiec Trench. Osiedle Juliana Marchlewskiego covered an area of 65.5 hectares and was intended to accommodate 20,000 people. In accordance with the postulates of socialist realism, three- or four-story buildings were constructed in symmetrical arrangements on the outskirts, with internal courtyards where educational and childcare facilities were located. The architectural forms of the new buildings were modest and sometimes referred to historical models in their details or façades. The apartments in the new housing estate were generally in line with the standards of the time. Each house was to be equipped with central heating, water and sewage systems, gas and electricity, and collective antennas, while the ground floors were designed to accommodate prams and bicycles.

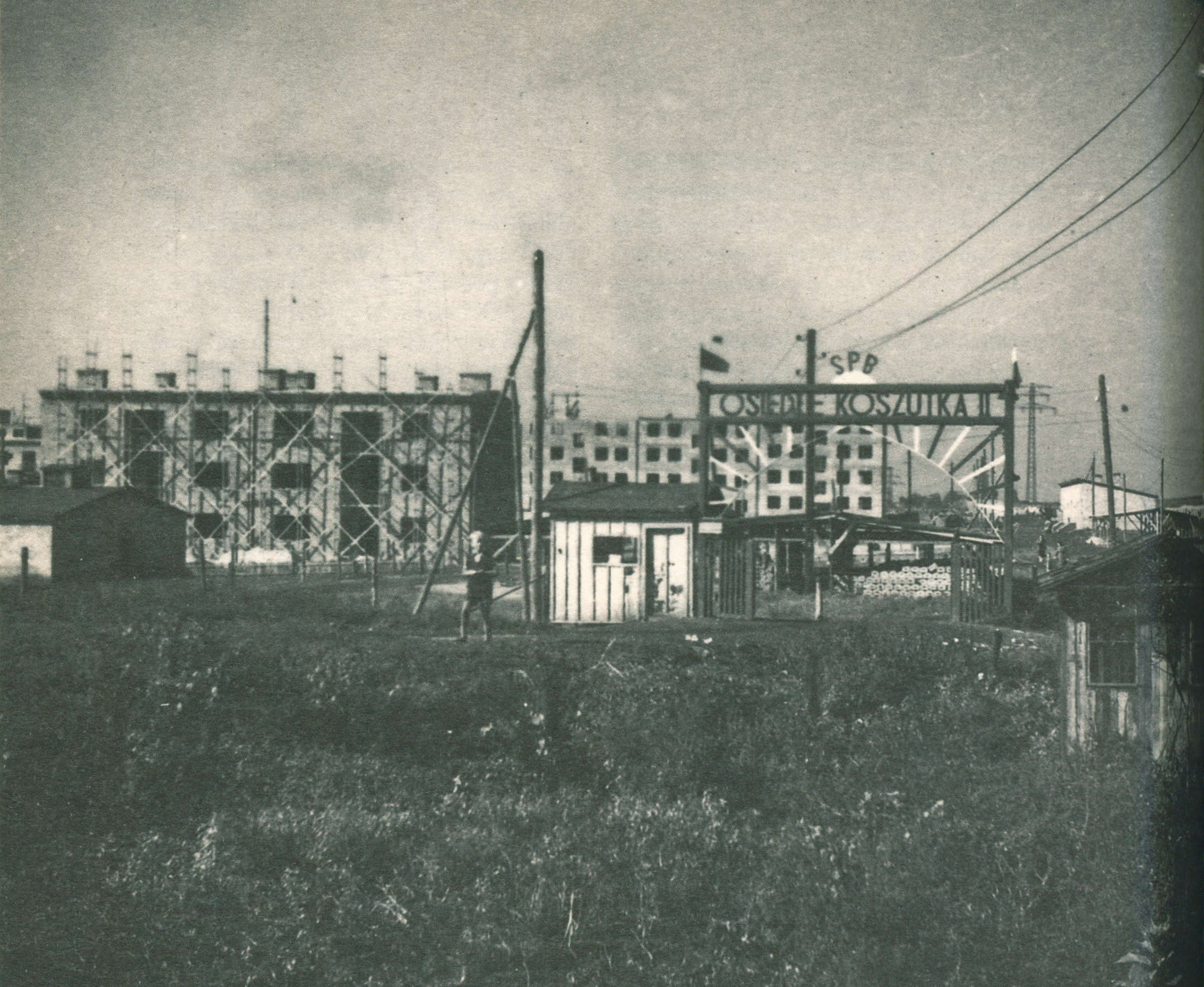
Construction of the "Koszutka II" buildings in Osiedle Juliana Marchlewskiego; photograph from around 1950

Between 1947 and 1948 (or between 1948 and 1949), a part of the housing estate called "Koszutka I" was built, located north of today's Misjonarzy Oblatów MN Street. The investor was the Central Management Board of Workers' Housing Estates in Warsaw, and the direct client was the Directorate for the Construction of Workers' Housing Estates in Katowice. The main part of Osiedle Juliana Marchlewskiego, referred to as "Koszutka II", began to be built at the turn of 1949 and 1950. It was the part of the housing estate south of Misjonarzy Oblatów MN Street. The architectural and urban design of "Koszutka II" was developed by a team from the Warsaw-based Miastoprojekt studio. Koszutka II consisted of five colonies. Colonies 2 and 3, together with a 15-classroom school, a kindergarten, and a nursery, were completed between 1952 and 1953, colony 4, together with a second school, a kindergarten, and a nursery, between 1954 and 1955, and colony 5, consisting of seven-story buildings and the Podkowa residential building, between 1954 and 1955.

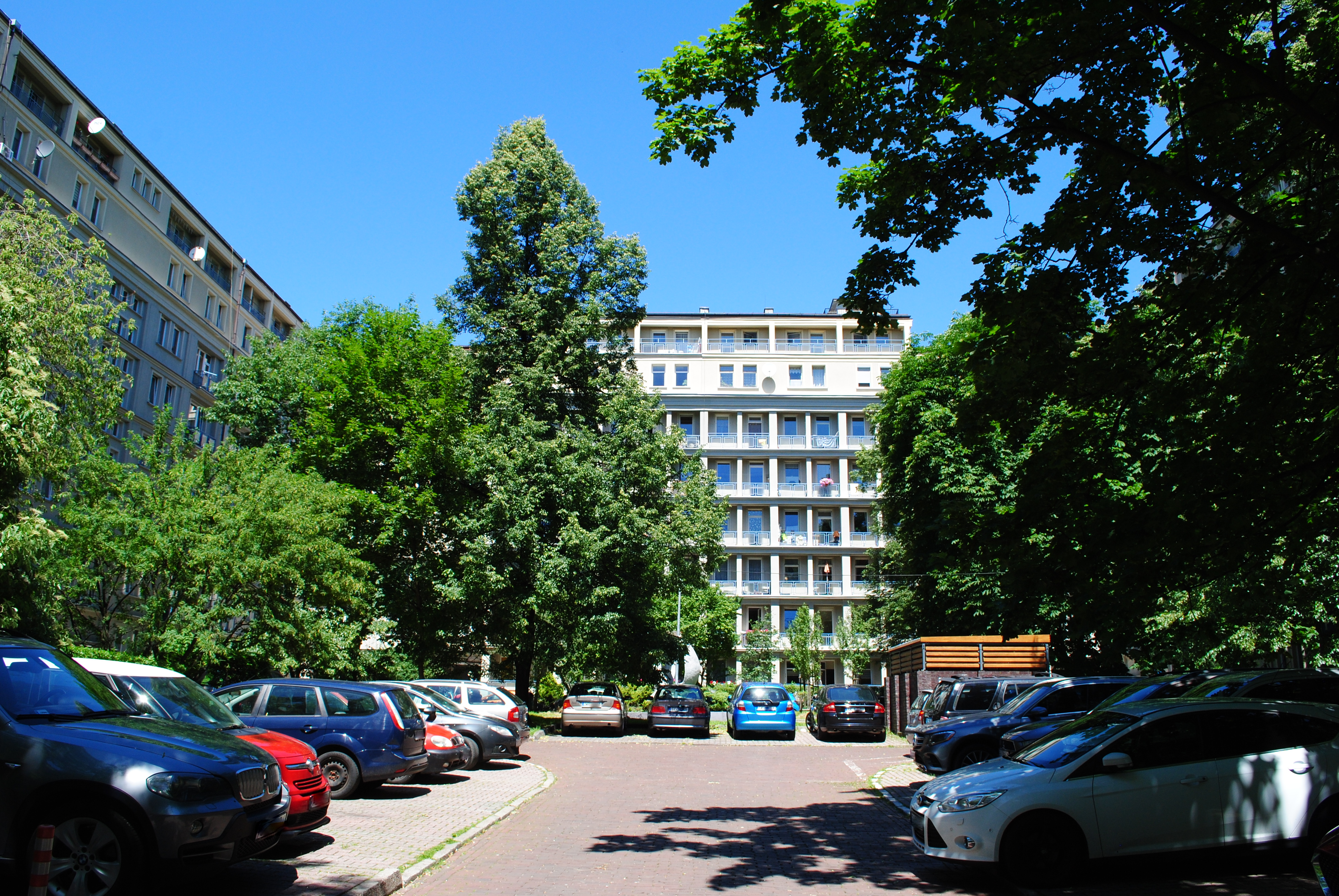
Podkowa residential building (1–15 S. Okrzei Street)

The Podkowa residential building was erected at 1–15 S. Okrzei Street between 1955 and 1958. It was designed by Włodzimierz Łubkowski and commissioned by the Directorate for the Construction of Workers' Housing Estates. The building has eight floors and was constructed on a U-shaped plan with an open section facing the street. Until Superjednostka was built, it remained the largest residential building in Katowice. The inner courtyard of Podkowa allowed for the creation of an original backyard. Sculptures were placed on the lawns, including one, which no longer exists, depicting a princess at the feet of which sat a prince transformed into a frog.

In the final period of socialist realism, the expansion of Koszutka continued, but it became necessary to draw up a new spatial development plan for the housing estate. This task was entrusted to a team from Katowice-based Miastoprojekt – Marian Skałkowski was the main designer, and the team also included Stanisław Kwaśniewicz and Mieczysław Król. The housing estate development plan was drawn up between 1955 and 1956 and set the direction for the expansion of Koszutka in the coming years. The new development plan broke with the peripheral development in favor of loose layouts, and modernism was favored over historicism in architecture. The present-day W. Korfanty Avenue was to play a special role in the new spatial development plan for the district. The expansion project covered the following areas: Chorzowska Street, M. Grażyński Street, W. Korfanty Avenue, B. Czerwiński Street, the area north of G. Morcinek Street, the buildings between Sokolska Street, Misjonarzy Oblatów MN Street, and Grunwaldzki Square, the buildings south of Katowicka Street, and the areas along J. N. Stęślicki Street.

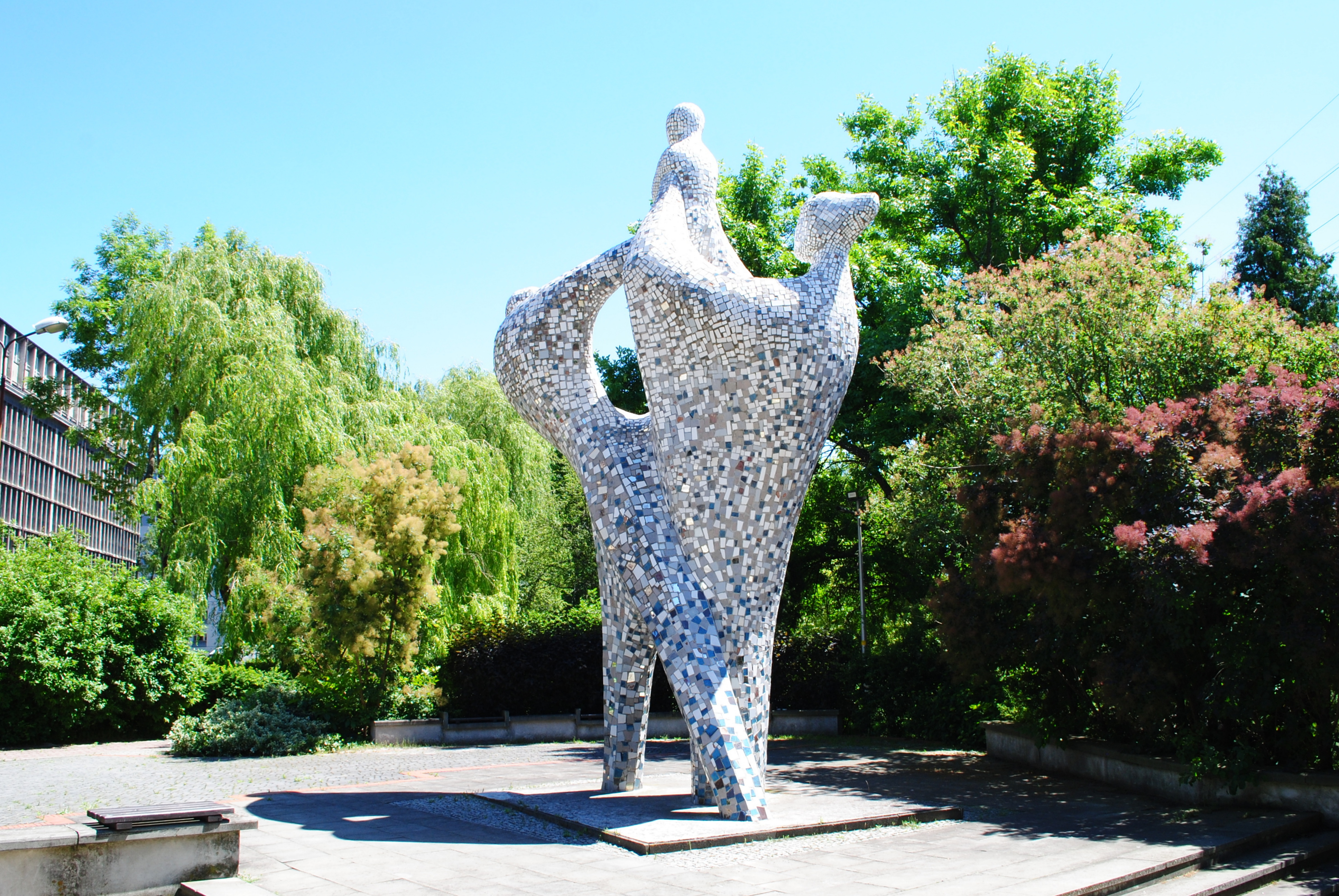
Rodzina sculpture by Jerzy Kwiatkowski

Grunwaldzki Square became the central point of Osiedle Juliana Marchlewskiego. It is surrounded by the Coal Industry Studies and Design Office building to the north, the Galeriowiec shopping center to the east, and the Kosmos Cinema to the west. The western part of the square is decorated with the Rodzina sculpture by Jerzy Kwiatkowski, depicting two figures holding a child. In 2003, the square was modernized according to a design by Alina and Andrzej Grzybowski, and a year later, the Artists' Gallery was built there.

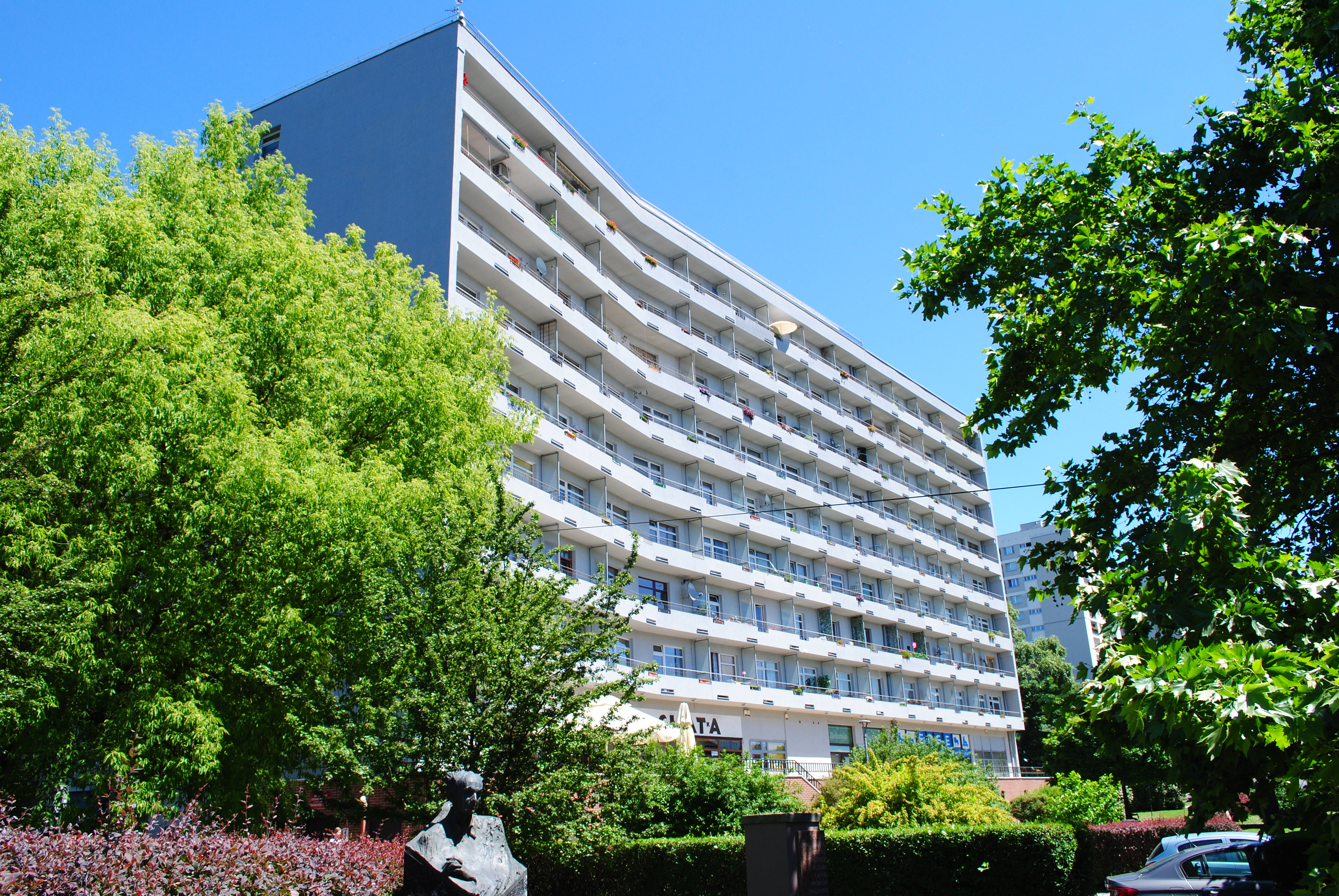
Galeriowiec residential building (4 Grunwaldzki Square)

The building of the Coal Industry Studies and Design Office at 8, 10, and 12 Grunwaldzki Square was built in the 1950s in the constructivist style according to a design by Janusz Ballenstedt. In the early 1960s, it was extended by one storey. The construction of the office dispelled the myth that it was impossible to build tall buildings in the district due to mining damage and the lack of accurate data on Koszutka's soils. The residential building, known as Galeriowiec, located at 4 Grunwaldzki Square, was built in the early 1960s. It has a distinctive shape with a broken façade facing the square. Between 1959 and 1965, the Kosmos Cinema was erected at 66 Sokolska Street. It was designed in the late modernist style according to a design by Stanisław Kwaśniewicz and Jurand Jarecki. The building was rebuilt between 2004 and 2006, completely changing its shape.

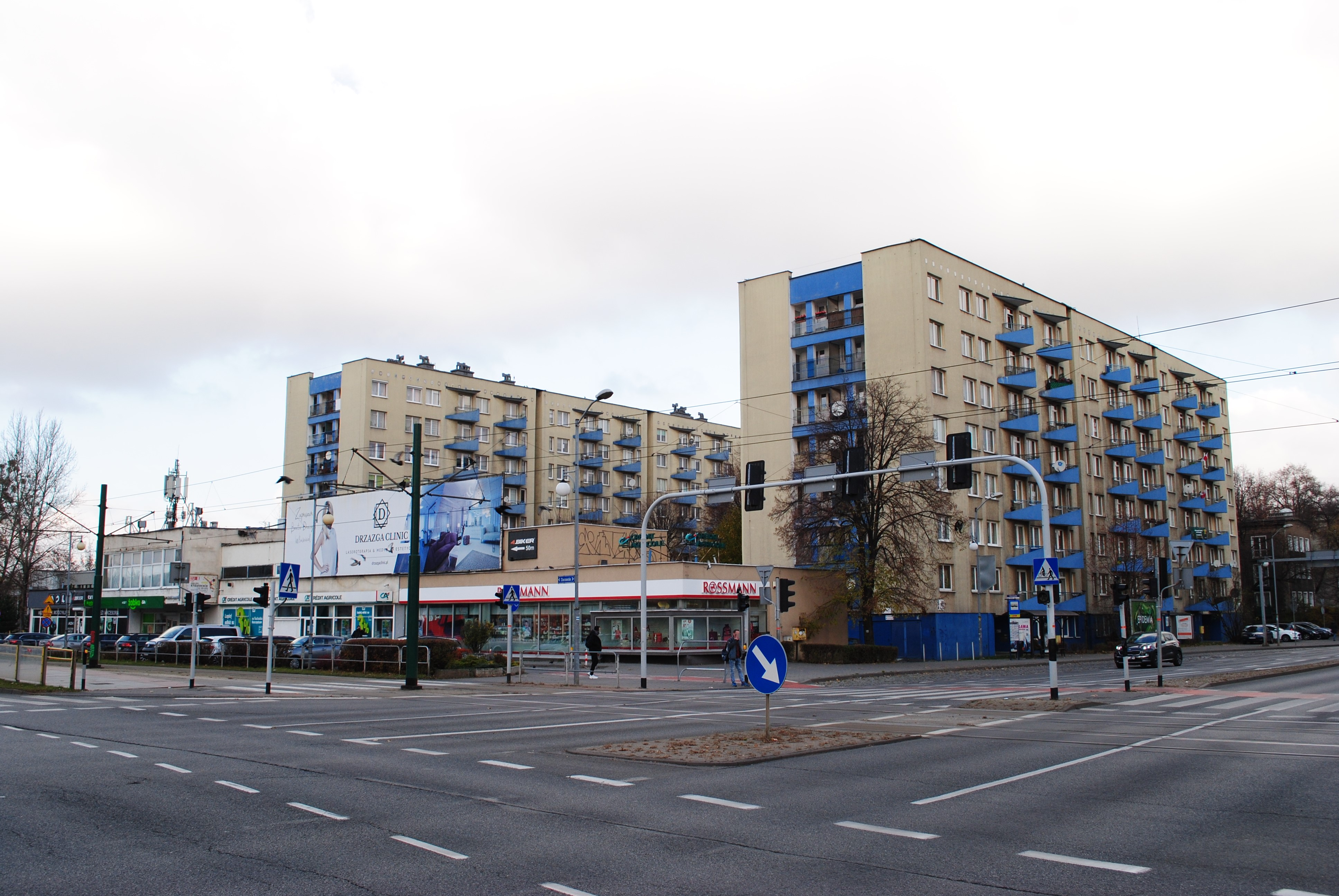
"Blue Blocks" – a complex of buildings on Chorzowska Street

The "Blue Blocks" are a complex of six residential buildings located on the eastern side of Chorzowska Street, built in the third stage of the expansion of Osiedle Juliana Marchlewskiego in the late 1960s, designed by Stanisław Kwaśniewicz. The name of the complex is associated with the color of the paint in which the blocks were originally painted. One of the most distinctive buildings in Koszutka is the residential block at 57 W. Korfanty Avenue, built in 1962 according to a design by Tadeusz Łobos. The building has nine floors, and its distinctive features are the arcades with V-shaped columns and loggias on the southern façade.

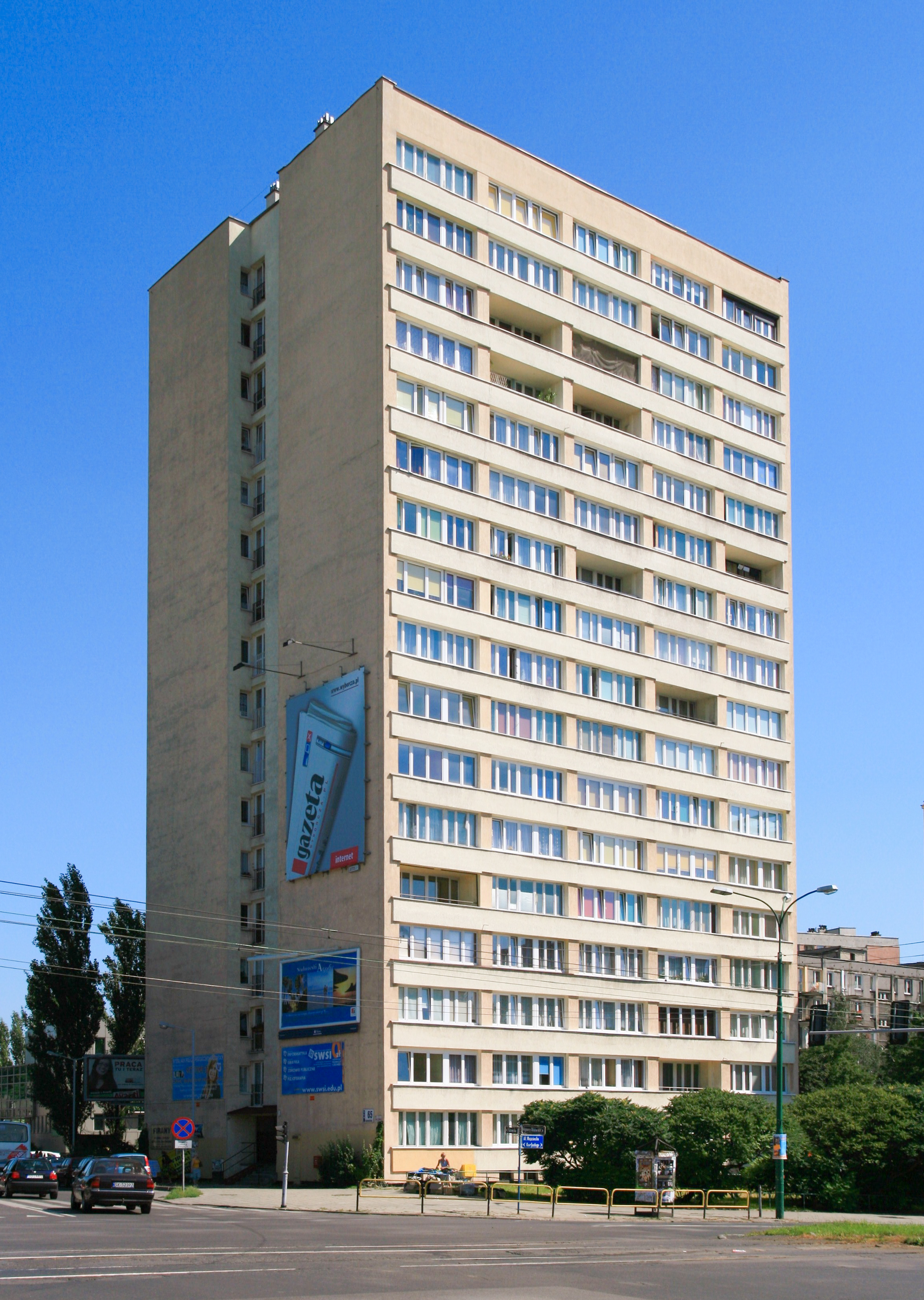
Górnik I residential building at 65 Katowicka Street

At the corner of the present-day W. Korfanty Avenue and Katowicka Street, as part of the implementation of Block D, the Górnik I residential building was built. It was constructed using climbing formwork between 1964 and 1965 and was intended for employees of the Staszic Coal Mine on the initiative of the Minister of Mining and Energy Jan Mitręga. It is an adaptation of a prototype climbing formwork building designed for the Kępa Potocka neighbourhood in Warsaw. Outside the capital, an identical building was erected in Sosnowiec on Ostrogórska Street.

In 1964, construction of the Spodek arena began on the site of the former "Maria's Court" buildings. It was designed by the Warsaw Office of Studies and Standard Designs for Industrial Construction, with Maciej Gintowt and Maciej Krasiński as the main designers. The arena has a volume of 338,732 m³ and 9,351 permanent seats. A sports hotel, an ice rink, and a gym were built next to it. The complex was officially opened on 8 May 1971. Between 2009 and 2011, Spodek underwent a comprehensive renovation.

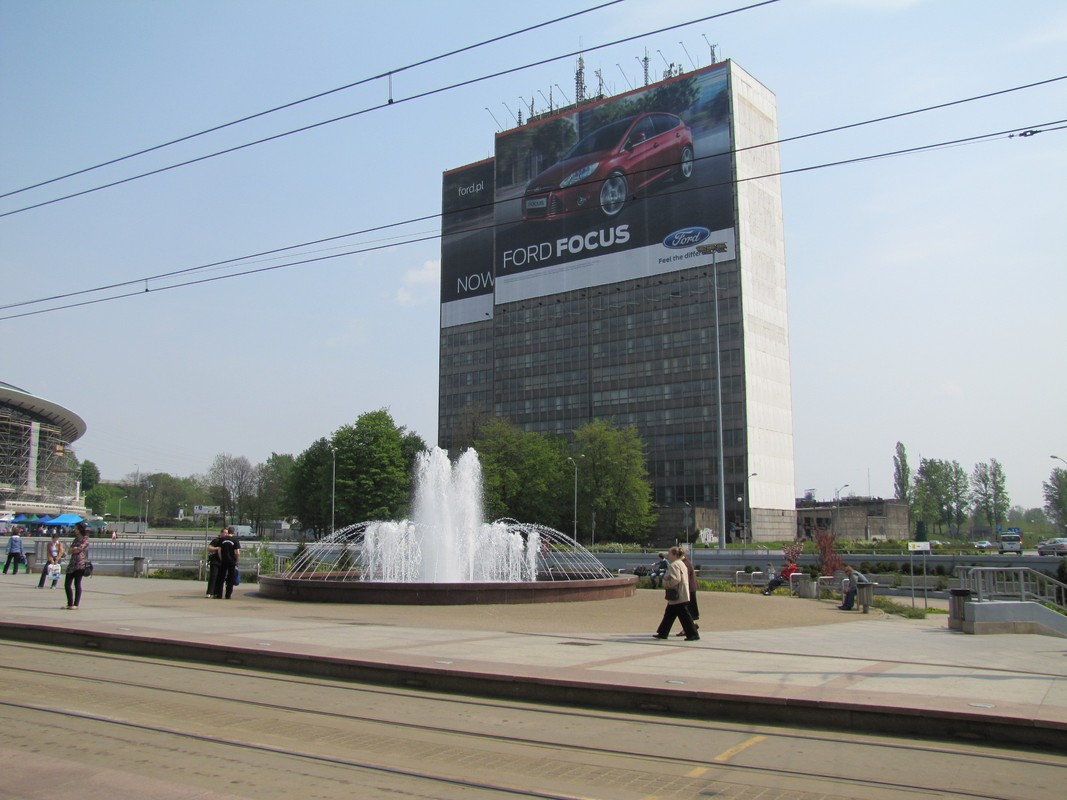
Polish State Railways Regional Directorate office building, built between 1965 and 1972; now demolished, formerly located at 1 W. Roździeński Avenue

Between 1965 and 1972, an office building for the Polish State Railways Regional Directorate was erected at 1 W. Roździeński Avenue, designed by Jerzy Gottfried. The skyscraper was fully commissioned in 1974, in the vicinity of the Spodek arena. It had 18 floors and was 80 meters high. Its demolition began in December 2014.

Koszutka, expanded in the 1950s and 1960s, became a model for new solutions not only in Katowice, but also for the entire Katowice Voivodeship. This was due to the development of a comprehensive urban plan for the entire district at the beginning of the expansion, and the subsequent design of specific buildings was entrusted to the same architects who developed the general plan for the housing estate. In addition, the terrain was skillfully used to accentuate the most important buildings, including Górnik I, the Spodek arena, and the Kosmos Cinema. The architecture and urban planning of Osiedle Koszutka is, to a certain extent, a realization of the ideas of global modernism contained, among others, in the Athens Charter, although this was not always successful, as many apartments were located along busy streets and intersections, and air pollution was also a problem at the time.

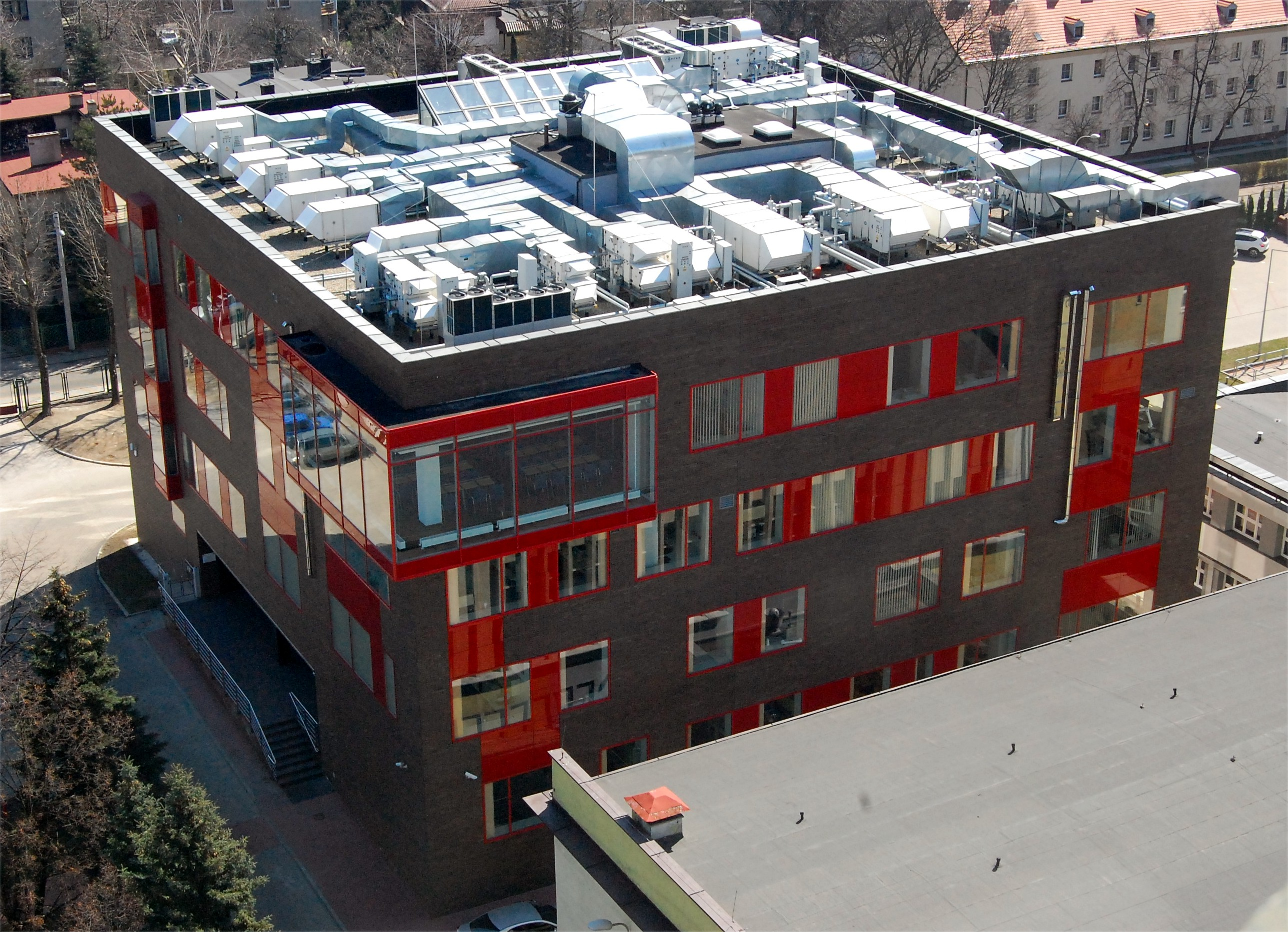
Building of the Clean Coal Technology Center, opened in May 2013

In 1971, the Central Mining Institute skyscraper with a roof height of 56 m was completed at Gwarków Square, at 79 W. Korfanty Avenue. The building was designed by Zygmunt Fagas and W. Górski. In the 1980s, low-rise multi-family buildings, reaching a maximum of four stories, were built in Koszutka. During this period, a housing estate of townhouses was also built in the area of Osikowa and Cedrowa streets.

After 1989, individual buildings were constructed in various locations throughout the district, including single-family houses in the eastern part. Between 1994 and 1999, the Church of the Sacred Heart of Jesus was built, designed by Tadeusz Czerwiński and Jan Muszyński. The architects incorporated the new structure of the church into the older monastery complex, and the low, pavilion-like architecture of the temple, with its softly outlined arc of the façade, fits in with the neighboring buildings of the district. In 2000, buildings were erected at 61 Katowicka Street and 56, 101, and 108 W. Korfanty Avenue. In 2007, a building was constructed at 1 Grabowa Street, and in 2011, a building at 54 Brzozowa Street. Between 2010 and 2011, the construction of the Clean Coal Technology Center building was underway at W. Korfanty Avenue – the five-story building was completed in October 2011, and the official opening took place in mid-May 2013.

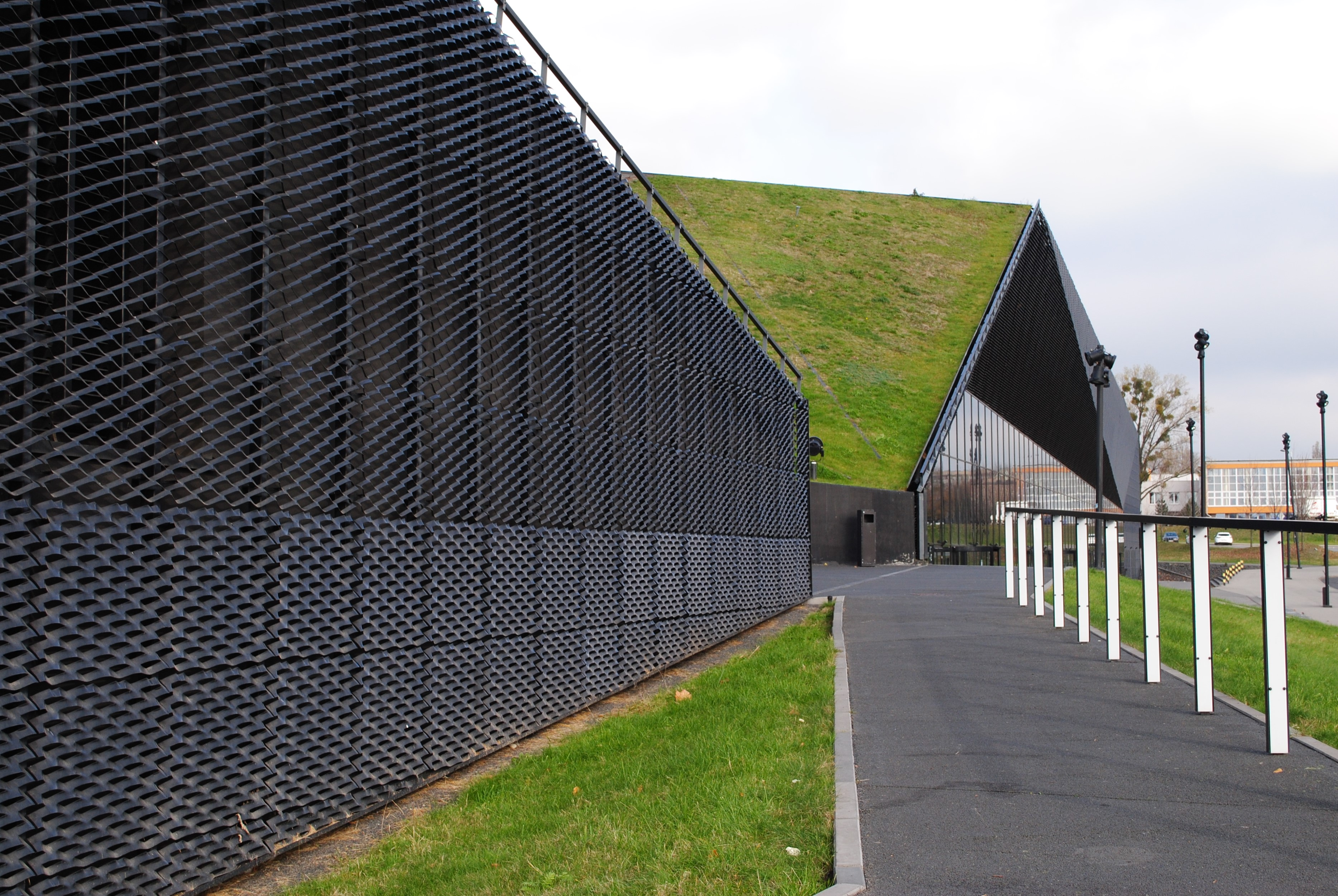
Building of the International Congress Center (1 Sławik and Antall Square)

Between 2010 and 2015, the Culture Zone was built on the border between Bogucice and Koszutka – a complex of large buildings filling the area of the former Katowice Coal Mine. The International Congress Center was built on the former steelworks site within the boundaries of Koszutka. The building was completed with a considerable delay in mid-2015. The architectural studio JEMS Architekci was responsible for its design. The building was created in the form of a cuboid, with a garden and a passageway between Spodek and the rest of the Culture Zone in the middle of the structure.

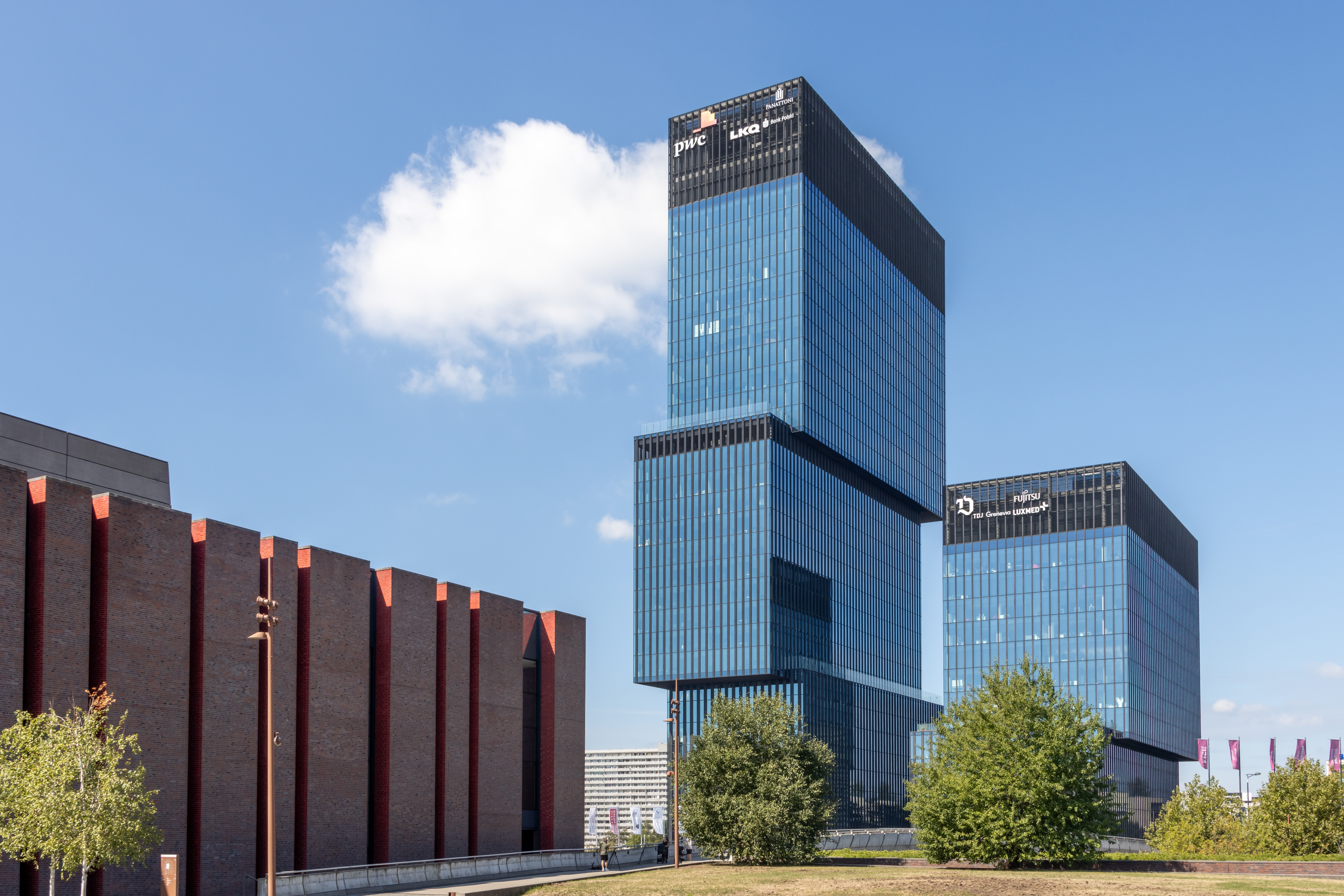
The .KTW complex, built between 2016 and 2022

On 21 March 2015, a monument to Henryk Sławik and József Antall Sr. was unveiled in front of the International Congress Center. The unveiling ceremony, held as part of the Polish-Hungarian Friendship Day celebrations, was attended by the former presidents of both countries: Bronisław Komorowski and János Áder. The monument was designed by Jan Kuka and Michał Dąbek.

Between 2016 and 2018, the .KTW I skyscraper was built on the site of the Polish State Railways Regional Directorate office building, and in November 2019, construction of the adjacent .KTW II building began. On 11 February 2022, .KTW II obtained a use permit, thus becoming the tallest office building in both Katowice and the entire Metropolis GZM.

On 25 October 2017, a bust of Hippocrates was unveiled in Hippocrates Square, near the Doctor's House, which is the first monument in Poland depicting this person. The square itself was established on 24 May 2018.

=== Monuments and commemorative plaques ===
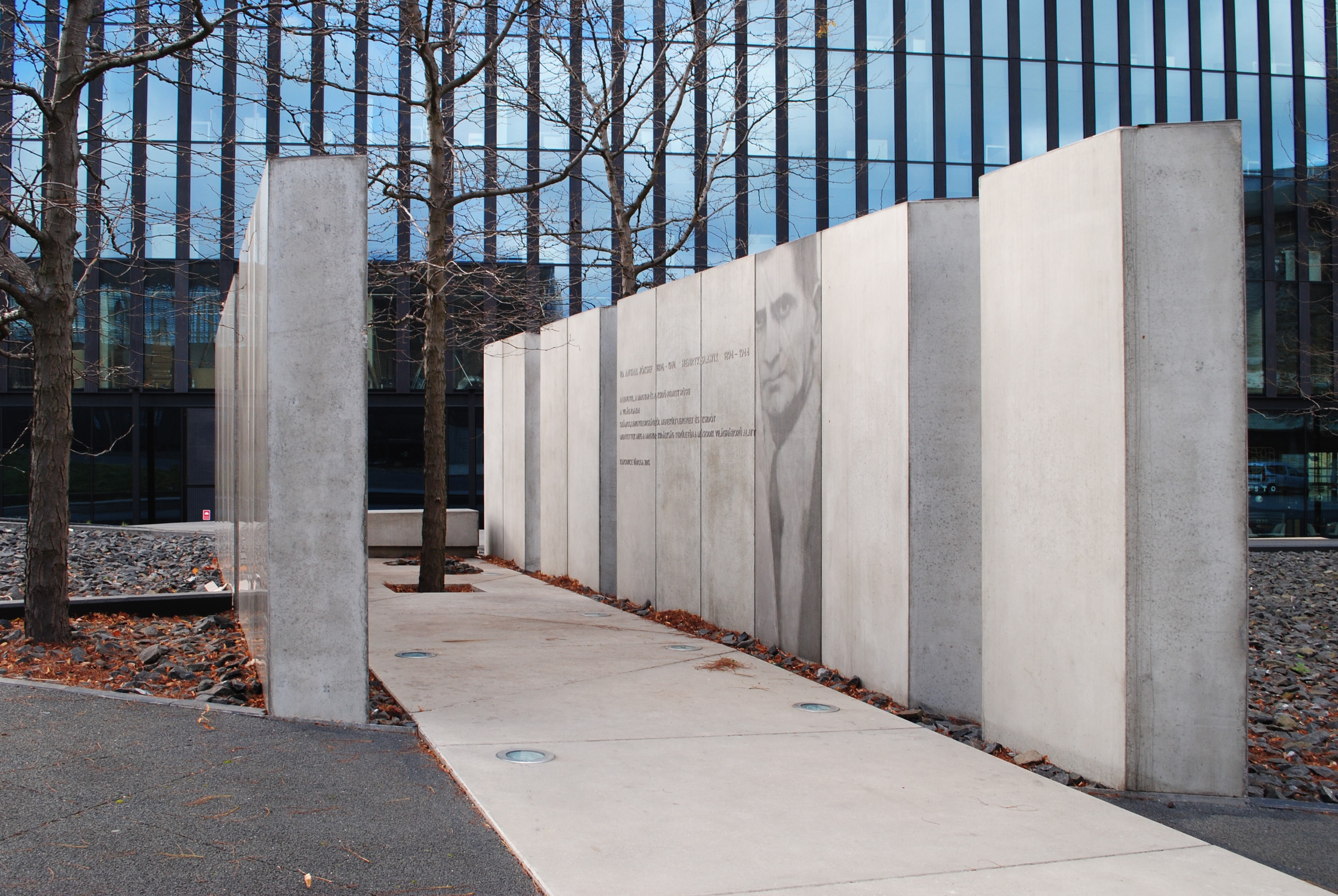
Monument to Henryk Sławik and József Antall Sr. (Sławik and Antall Square)

- Artists' Gallery (Grunwaldzki Square);
- Rodzina monument (Grunwaldzki Square);
- Monument to Henryk Sławik and József Antall Sr. (Sławik and Antall Square);
- Bust of Hippocrates (Hippocrates Square).

=== Zoning ===
In the Koszutka-Wełnowiec urban unit, the largest share is held by: multi-family residential areas (20.58 ha; 14.29% of the unit's area), service areas (31.80 ha; 14.86%), production and service areas (23.16 ha; 10.82%), transport areas (24.82 ha; 11.6%), vacant building areas (31.71 ha; 14.81%), landscaped green areas (23.21 ha; 10.84%) and wasteland (26.93 ha; 12.58%). There are no technical infrastructure areas, agricultural areas or forests there. The share of service areas in Koszutka itself is relatively large on the scale of Katowice and amounts to approximately 25%.

The share of built-up area in Koszutka in 2007 was 29%, which was slightly higher than the average for Katowice as a whole (23%). The floor area ratio at that time was significantly higher than for Katowice as a whole (0.49) and fluctuated around 0.83. The weighted average number of storeys is 2.86.

In July 2009, 37.97% of the area of the Koszutka-Wełnowiec urban unit was covered by the provisions of zoning.

The following conservation areas or areas proposed for protection are located in Koszutka:

- Residential and mixed-use buildings from the 1930s and valuable socialist realism architecture;
- A regular complex of buildings from the 1930s, consisting of: a single-family housing estate, apartment blocks, and commercial buildings.

== Education ==
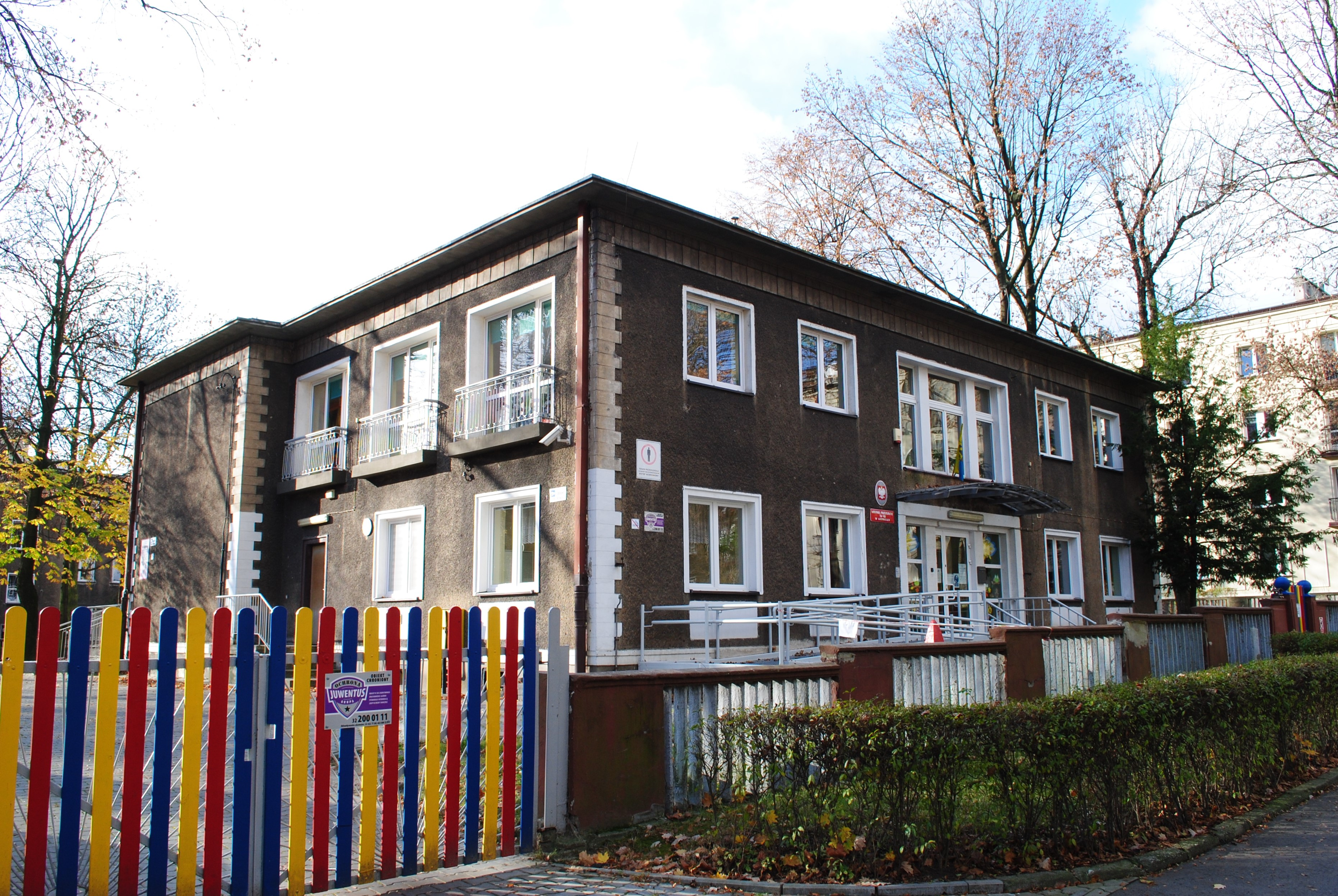
Building of Municipal Kindergarten No. 48 (56a Sokolska Street)

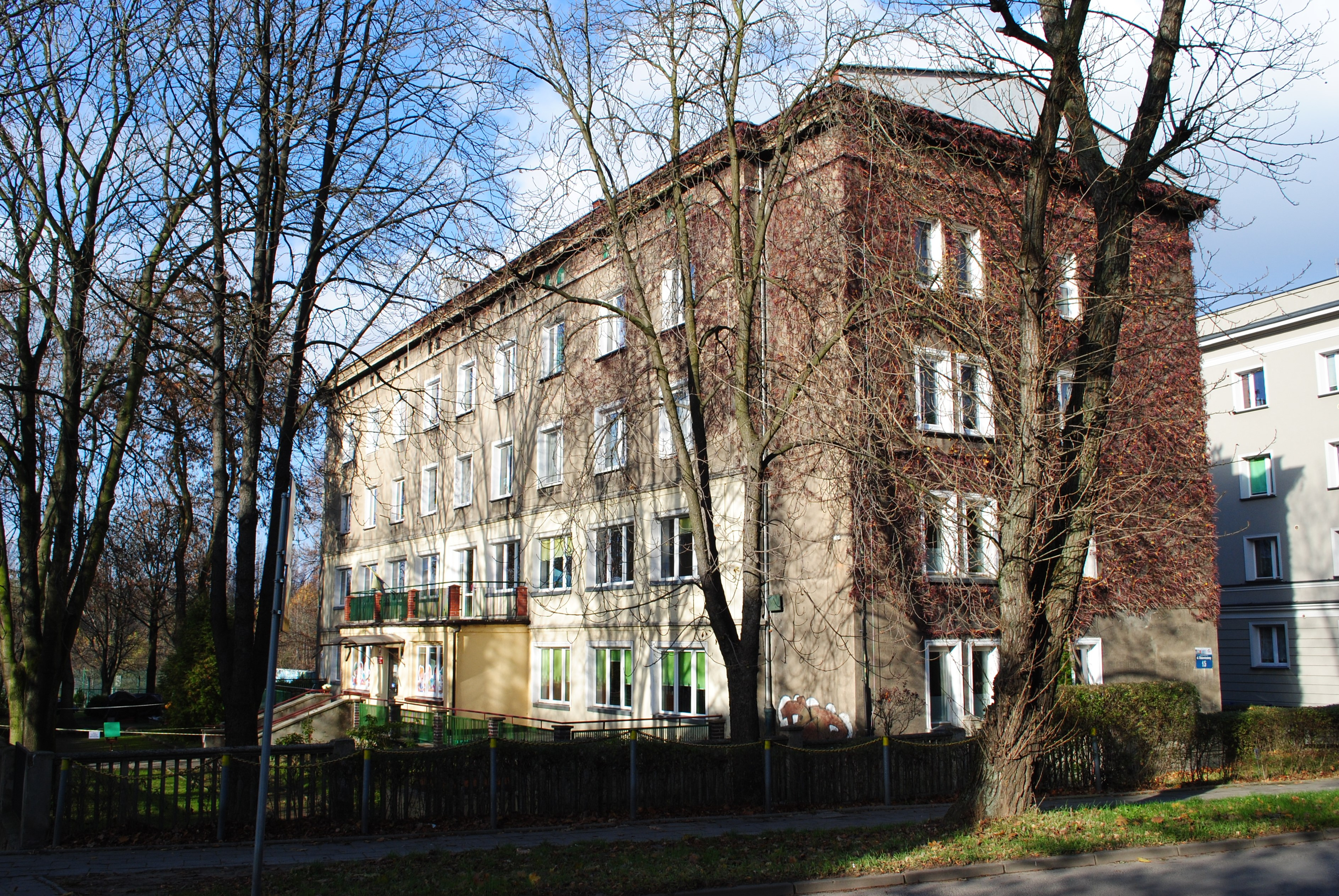
Seat of Municipal Kindergarten No. 52 (15 K. Iłłakowiczówna Street)

In June 2022, the following educational institutions operated in Koszutka:

1. Nurseries:
  - Municipal Nursery in Katowice, Branch of the Municipal Nursery (3a J. Ordon Street),
2. Kindergartens:
  - Municipal Kindergarten No. 14 (16a S. Wyszyński Street),
  - Municipal Kindergarten No. 48 (56a Sokolska Street),
  - Municipal Kindergarten No. 52 (15 K. Iłłakowiczówna Street),
  - Social Arts Kindergarten of the Krystyna Rudkowska Foundation (47 M. Grażyński Street).
3. Primary schools:
  - Krzysztof Kamil Baczyński Primary School No. 36 (13 K. Iłłakowiczówny Street),
  - Józef Kocurek Primary School No. 62 (3d J. Ordona Street).
4. Secondary schools:
  - Stanisław Maczek 4th General High School (54 Katowicka Street).
5. School complexes:
  - School and Kindergarten Complex for Deaf and Hard-of-Hearing Children (17 M. Grażyński Street).
6. Universities:
  - University of Silesia, Faculty of Social Sciences (53 M. Grażyński Street; one of two locations).

Koszutka is also home to several private schools of various types, including the Academy of Podology (25 G. Morcinek Street), the ROE Arts Schools – Regional Education Center (6 B. Czerwiński Street), as well as foreign language and dance schools.

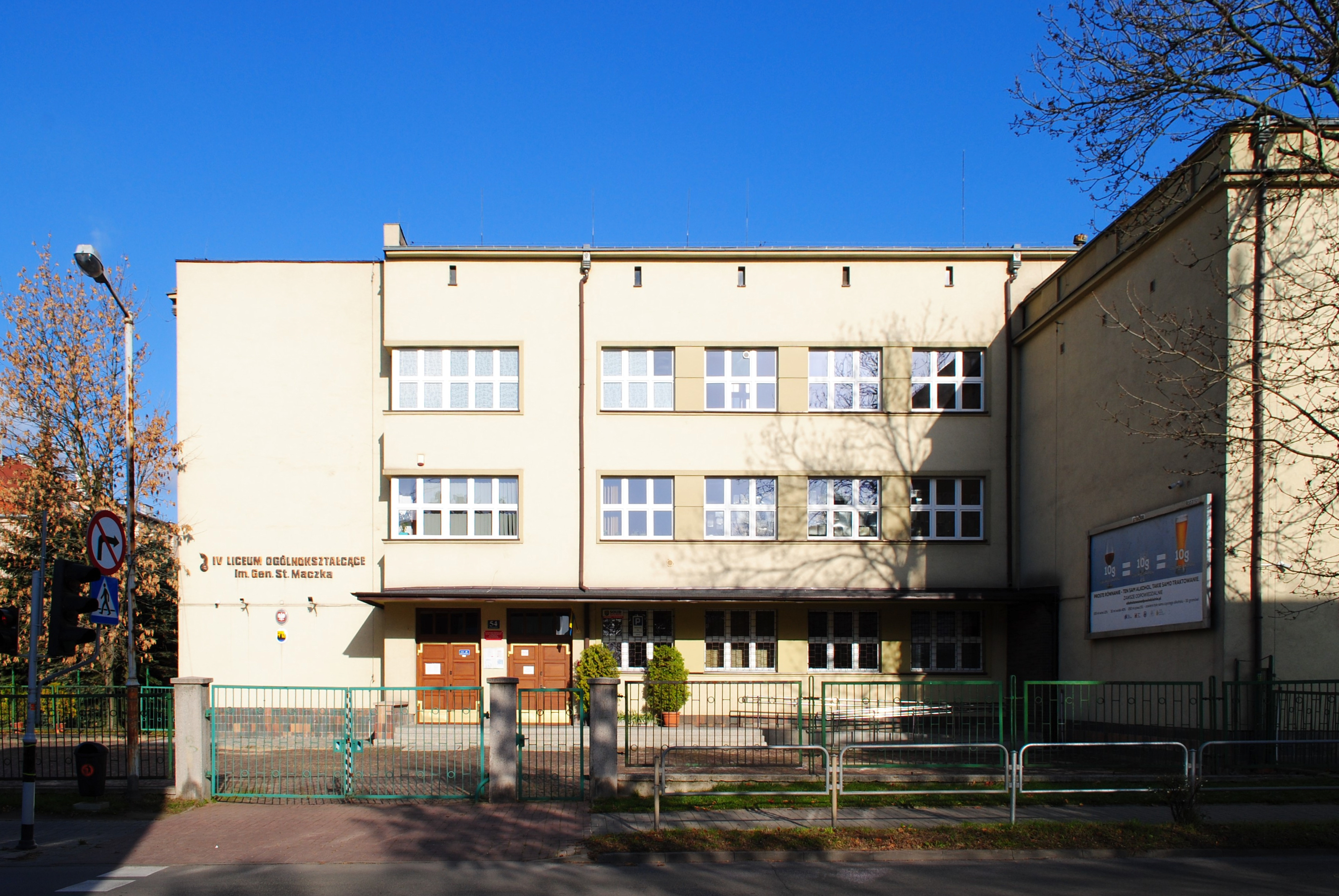
Building of the Stanisław Maczek 4th General High School (54 Katowicka Street), housed in a building from 1938

The first school in Koszutka was established in the interwar period. The Katowice City Council, by virtue of a resolution passed in 1936, decided to build a new public school in the present-day district. In September 1938, an International Style school at 54 Katowicka Street was opened. During the German occupation, the building was converted into a German field hospital on 1 February 1940. In March 1945, it resumed its educational functions and until April 1947, it housed only a primary school. From 1 September 1947, the educational authorities raised the school's organizational level, creating a four-year high school over the years. In 1951, the school had 19 primary classes and 5 high school classes. On 15 November 1951, the Education Department of the Voivodeship National Council separated the high school (No. 11) and the primary school (No. 33) into separate institutions.

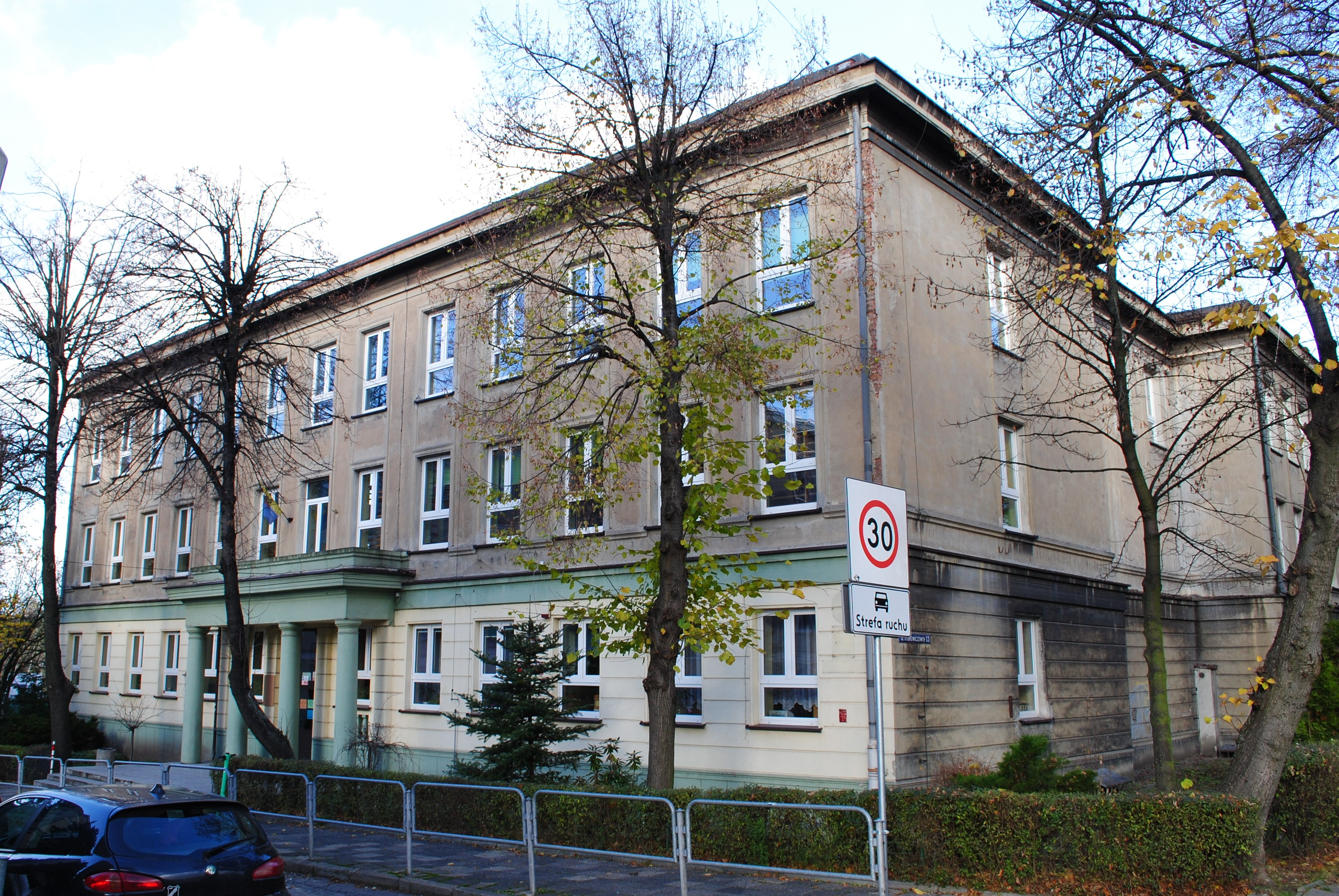
Building of Krzysztof Kamil Baczyński Primary School No. 36 (13 K. Iłłakowiczówna Street)

In 1953, Municipal Kindergarten No. 48 at 56a Sokolska Street was opened. The following year, on 6 September 1954, Primary School No. 36 was officially opened. In the 1960/1961 school year, it had a record number of 1,502 students, taught by a total of 40 teachers. In 1961, the school was downsized as some of the students were transferred to Primary Schools No. 57 and 59.

In 1955, the General High School of the Society of Friends of Children was established in Osiedle Juliana Marchlewskiego in Koszutka, operating near Primary School No. 9. The building was located at what is now 53 M. Grażyński Street. In the 1956/1957 school year, it was renamed Primary School and General High School No. 5 in Katowice. In 1961, the high school moved to the building at 17 M. Grażyński Street, and from 1967, it was designated as Jan Kawalec General High School No. 9. Since September 1986, the current Henryk Sienkiewicz 9th General High School has been located in Osiedle Tysiąclecia.

In 1959, the Ministry of Education issued a decree on cooperation between schools and other similar institutions with the Polish Scouting and Guiding Association. The first school to establish a Polish Scouting Association troop was Primary and High School No. 5 in Katowice-Koszutka. The then school principal, Scoutmaster Tadeusz Pikiewicz, contributed significantly to the scouting work.

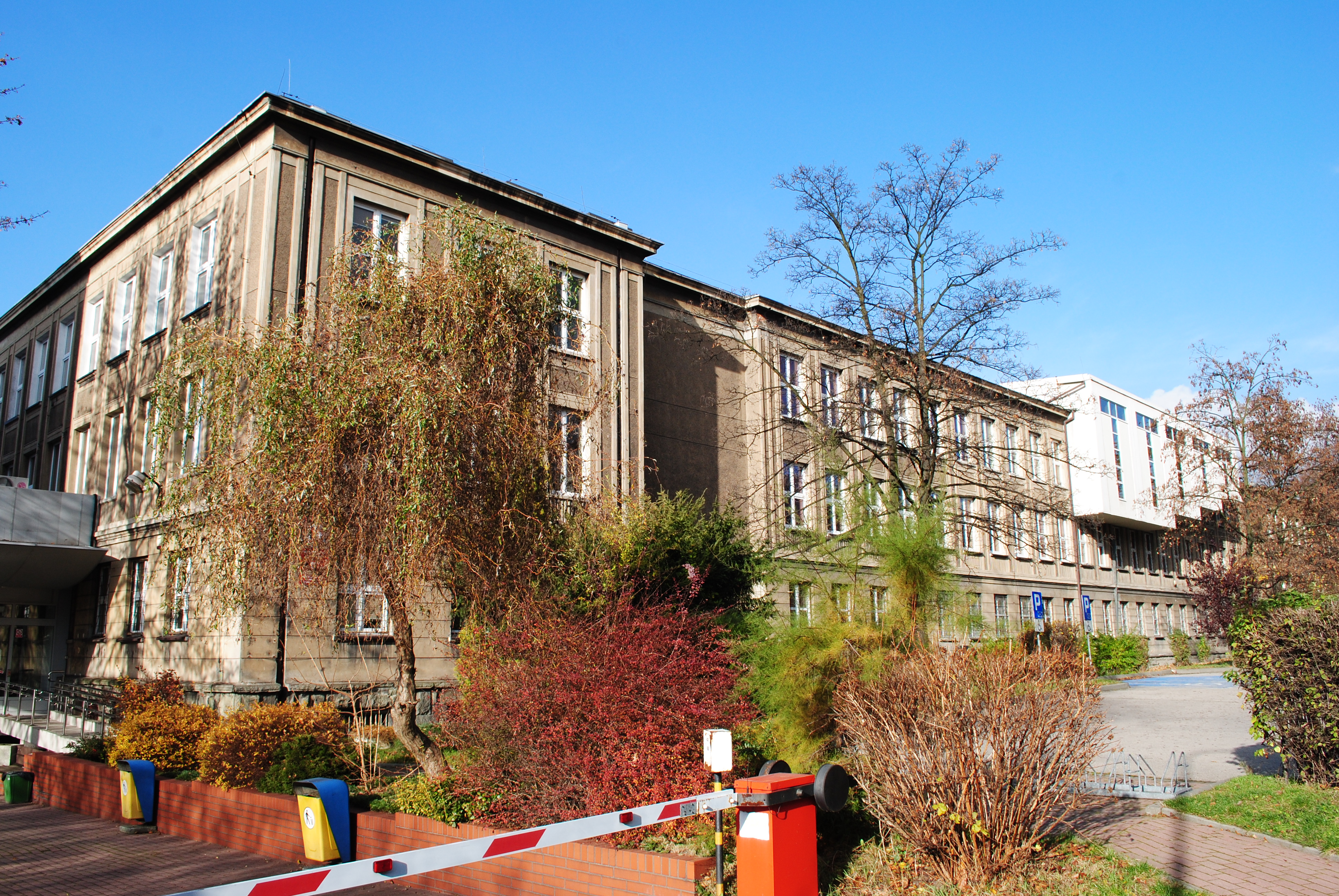
Building of the Faculty of Social Sciences of the University of Silesia (53 M. Grażyński Street; one of two locations)

On 1 September 1964, Primary School No. 62 and 4th General High School were separated. In September 1973, Primary School No. 62 inaugurated its new premises on J. Ordona Street. From 1996, General Stanisław Maczek became the new patron of the high school.

In 1973, the Faculty of Social Sciences was established at the University of Silesia. In 1976, the Faculty of Pedagogy and Psychology was separated from this faculty and located at what is now 53 M. Grażyński Street. In 1979, the faculty moved to a new building at present-day Sokolska Street. As a result of the reorganization of the University of Silesia, on 1 October 2019, the institutes of the Faculty of Pedagogy and Psychology were incorporated into the Faculty of Social Sciences.

In September 1981, the Teaching and Educational Team for Children with Hearing Impairments was established, and its headquarters was located in a single-family house at Drozdów Street in Katowice-Brynów. In 1993, the facility moved to Koszutka, to a building at 17 M. Grażyński Street. In September 1998, the center changed its name to School and Kindergarten Complex for Deaf and Hard-of-Hearing Children, and a few months later, on 1 January 1999, the school complex was taken over by the city of Katowice.

The WOM Regional Teacher Training Center is located at 7 S. Wyszyński Street. It was established by the Katowice Voivode on 9 June 1989 as the Provincial Methodological Center in Katowice. Since 17 December 2001, the center has been operating under its current name. Currently, it is one of the largest public teacher training institutions in Poland, run by the local government of the Silesian Voivodeship and accredited by the Silesian superintendent. The institution offers over 200 training courses in various fields and areas.

== Public safety and social services ==
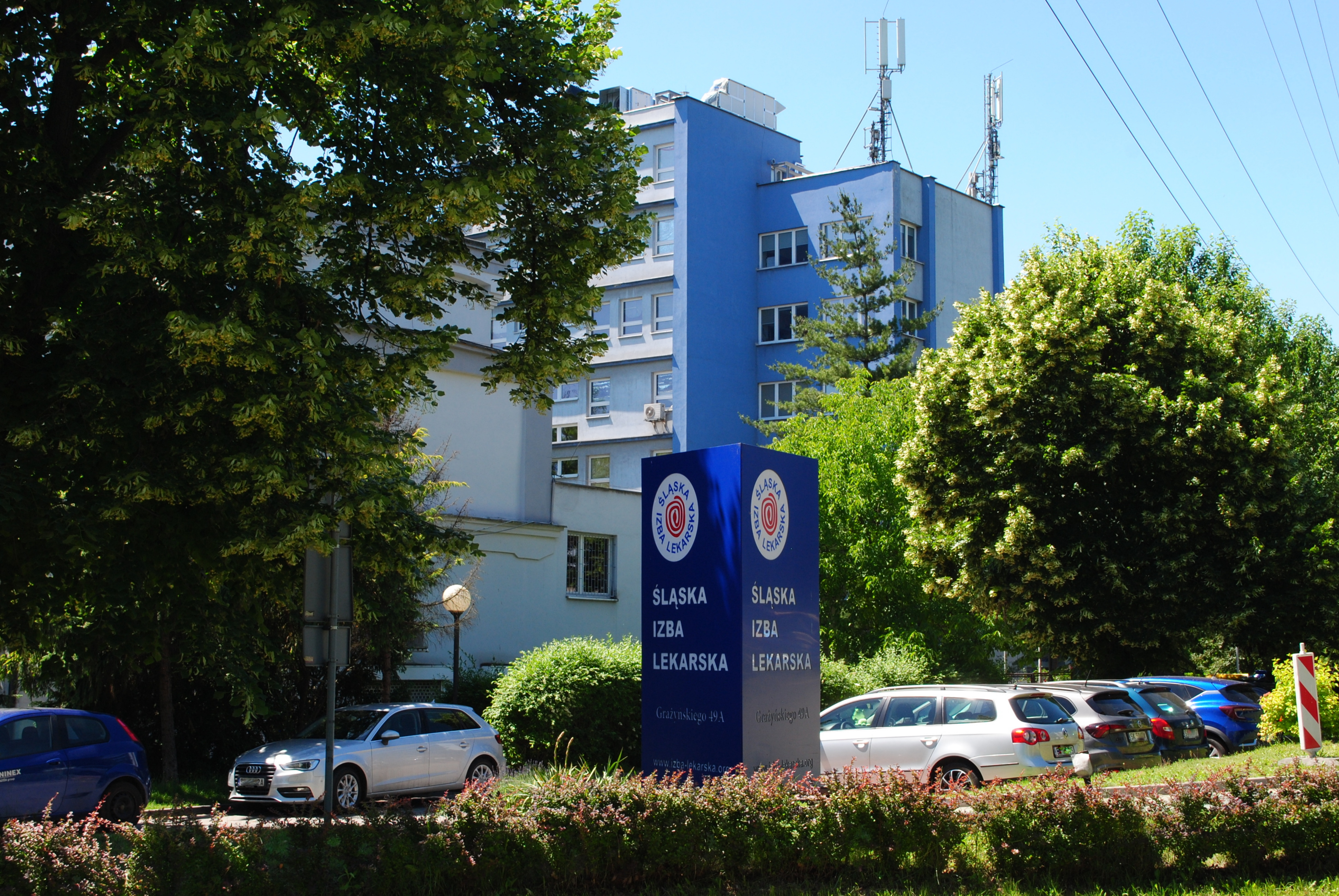
Building of the Silesian District Medical Chamber (49a M. Grażyński Street)

In terms of crime rate in 2007, Koszutka was one of the less safe districts of Katowice, with a rate of 3.0 crimes per 100 residents, which placed it in 5th place among all 22 districts. This rate has decreased since 2004 from 6.05 crimes per 100 residents. One of the places where crimes are most frequently committed there is W. Korfanty Avenue. In a 2011 survey, 45.5% of Koszutka residents said they felt safe in their district, while 53.5% of respondents disagreed. In 2013, there were 425 crimes there, which translates to 3.8 crimes per 100 people (the third highest rate among all districts of Katowice). These included 18 robberies, 14 acts of hooliganism, and 7 acts of domestic violence.

In 2007, there were 20 traffic accidents in Koszutka.

The headquarters of Police Station II of the Katowice Municipal Police is located at K. Iłłakowiczówna Street and covers, among others, the entire district. Koszutka also has a video surveillance system managed by the Crisis Management Department of the Katowice City Hall. In 2013, there were three analog surveillance cameras operating in the district.

Fire protection in Koszutka is provided by Rescue and Firefighting Unit No. 1 Szopienice of the Municipal Headquarters of the State Fire Service in Katowice at 130 Krakowska Street.

One of the facilities of the Municipal Social Welfare Center in Katowice operates at 19a G. Morcinek Street. Two units operate there: the Department for Homeless People and the Center for Specialist Counseling, Methodology, and Strategy.

The AGMED Private Healthcare Center is located at 12–16 K. Dunikowski Street, and there are also many pharmacies in various locations throughout the district. Other healthcare facilities in Koszutka in June 2022 included the Mazan Surgery Clinic (54 Brzozowa Street), DUO MEDICA (1d Grabowa Street), and INTER-MED (32 Grabowa Street).

The Silesian Regional Medical Chamber is located in Koszutka, in the "Doctor's House". Its headquarters are located at 49a M. Grażyński Street. It is one of the largest regional chambers in Poland. Its origins date back to 1925, and currently it has over 16,500 doctors and dentists from the former Katowice Voivodeship. The chamber expresses its opinions and positions on broadly defined healthcare issues. It cooperates with universities and numerous institutions, as well as with local government organizations and other professional associations.

== Culture ==
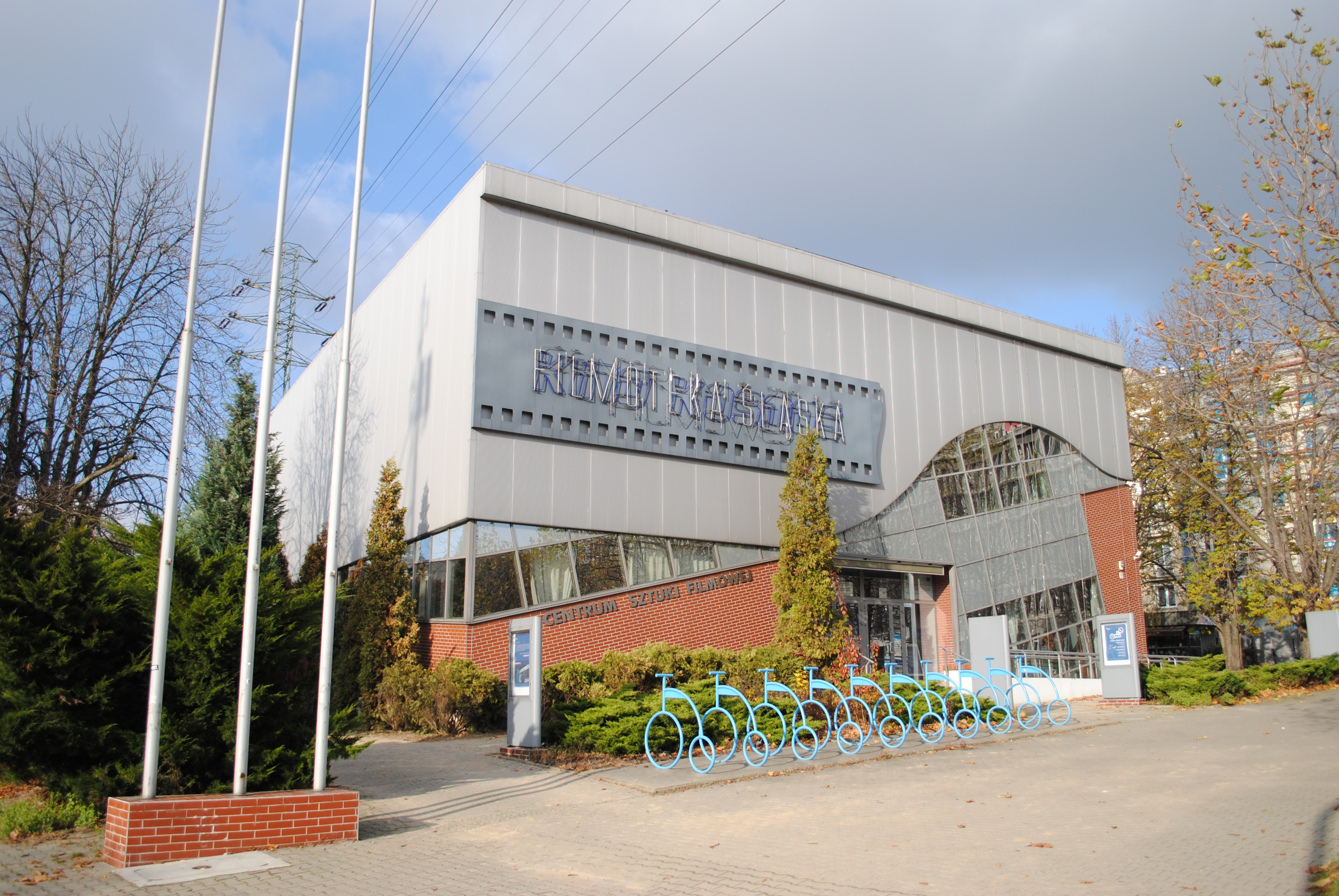
Building of the Kosmos Cinema – Center for Film Art (66 Sokolska Street)

The beginnings of cultural activity in Koszutka date back to the interwar period. On 5 April 1937, on the initiative of Stefan Śmigielski, the Bishop Eugène de Mazenod Church Choir was founded. The choir made its debut during the consecration ceremony of the monastery of the Missionary Oblates of Mary Immaculate and the chapel. It had 40–50 members, and between 1949 and 1950 it functioned as a club of church music enthusiasts. On 1 March 1956, the Social Artistic Center was established in Koszutka, with its headquarters on M. Grażyński Street. In 1977, 418 students participated in this cultural and educational institution, where they were taught by 14 teachers. Since 1992, an Artistic Kindergarten has been operating, offering additional classes. On 1 September 1956, the Social Music Center was also established on M. Grażyński Street, on the initiative of Krystyna Rutkowska. In 1970, the building was handed over to the city, after which the center shared its headquarters with the Koszutka Municipal Cultural Center.

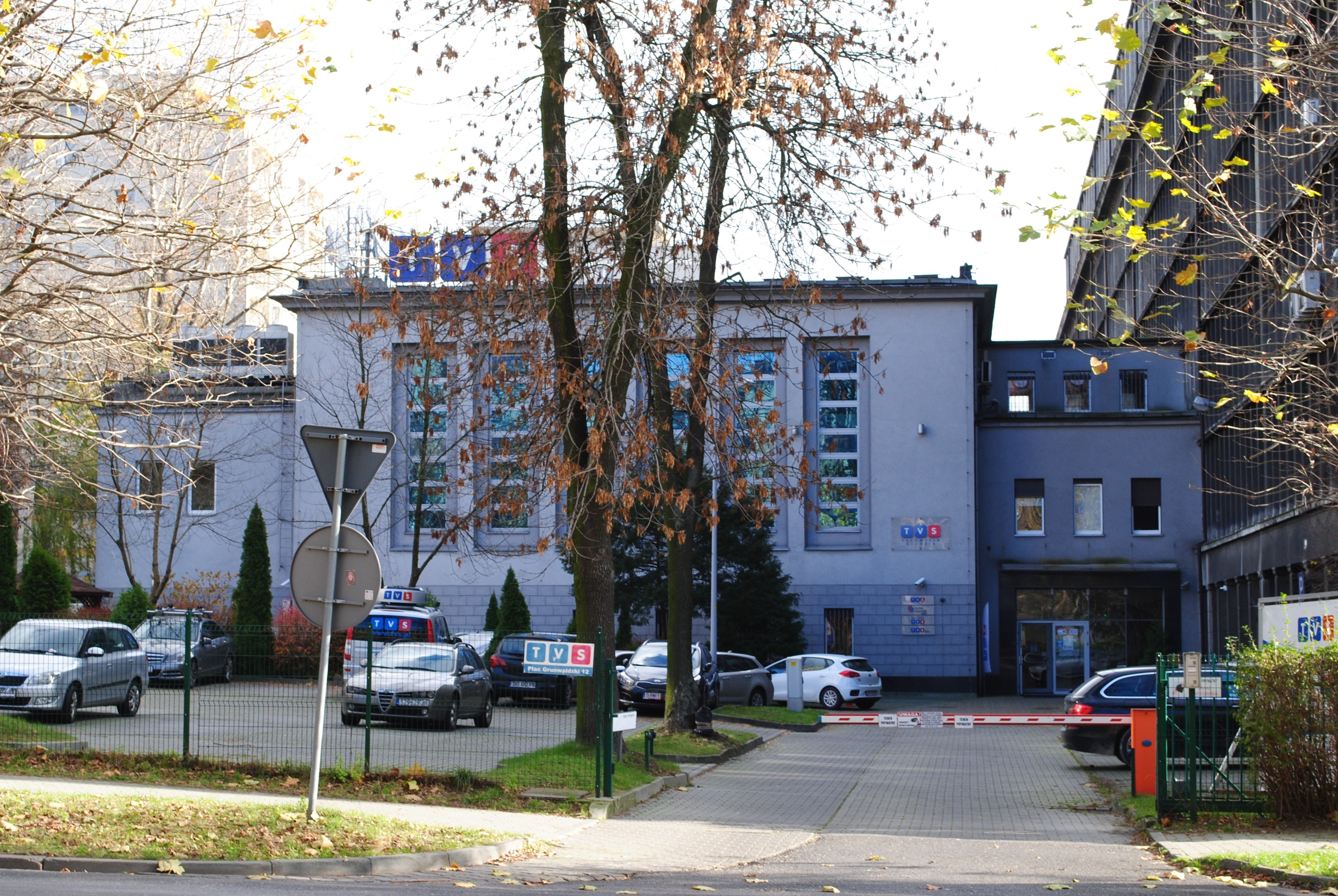
Headquarters of TVS television at 12 Grunwaldzki Square

In 1981, Śląski Klub Fantastyki was established. It is a socio-cultural association promoting speculative fiction. It also organizes a number of events of varying scope, as well as meetings with authors, publishers, and translators. The club has a number of sections, including literature, manga and anime, dance, Tolkien studies, RPG, and quidditch. Śląski Klub Fantastyki is headquartered at 5 A. Górnik Street.

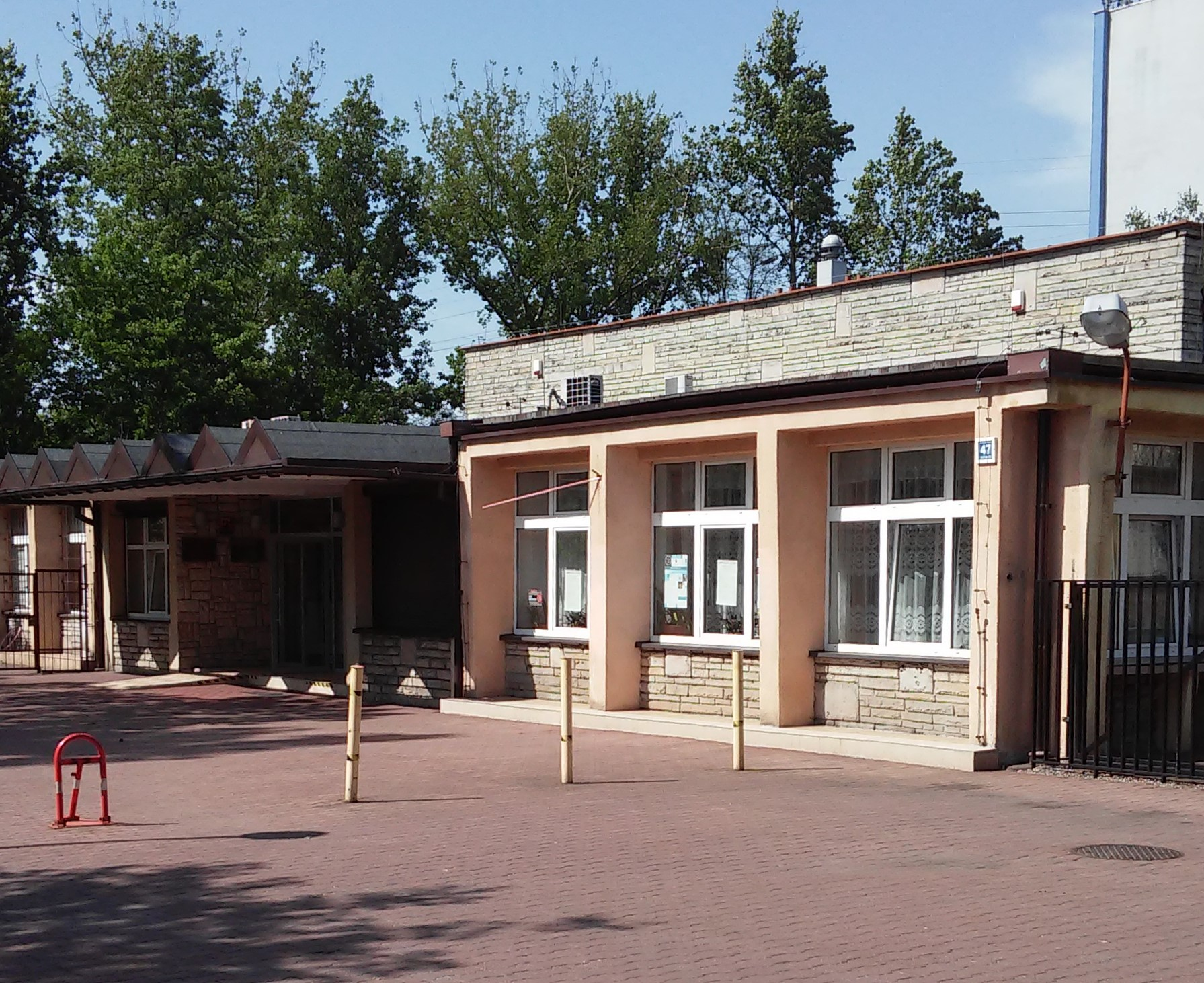
Headquarters of the Koszutka Municipal Cultural Center (47 M. Grażyński Street)

The Kosmos Cinema was established in Koszutka and remains the only cinema built in Katowice during the Polish People's Republic era. Construction of the building, designed by Stanisław Kwaśniewicz and Jurand Jarecki, began in 1959, and it opened in 1965. Over time, the Kosmos Cinema became one of the most prestigious in Katowice, and was also the first to be equipped with projection equipment for playing 70 mm film. Between 2004 and 2006, the cinema was rebuilt and taken over by the Film Art Center. The Kosmos Cinema is run by the Silesia-Film Institution and hosts premieres of Silesian films, film workshops, meetings with movie stars, debates, and other events related to film culture. The second pillar of the cinema is the Silesian Film Library, which is the only regional film library with such a rich collection of films. It also houses a media library where films from the Silesian Film Library's collection can be viewed.

In the 1960s, the Elektron Cinema began operating in the rear wing of the Coal Industry Studies and Design Office building at Grunwaldzki Square. It had an auditorium with 380 seats. TVS television was established on the site of the former cinema. The television station is located at 12 Grunwaldzki Square. It was established in 2008 and its programs focus on topics related to Upper Silesia and the Dąbrowa Basin. It broadcasts via terrestrial digital television, as well as on digital platforms and cable networks throughout the country.

The Koszutka Municipal Cultural Center is located at 47 M. Grażyński Street and is registered as a cultural institution of the city of Katowice. The center was originally established as a District Cultural Center in 1970 on the initiative of the residents of Koszutka. In 1993, it was transformed into the Koszutka Municipal Cultural Center. It currently offers classes for children and adults on a variety of topics, including the Film Academy, Literary Salon, Traveler's Club, and Music Salon. The same building also houses Branch No. 11 of the Municipal Public Library. The library in Koszutka has been operating since 1953. Currently, there are two separate reading rooms there, and it organizes reading education classes for children. The library cooperates with schools and kindergartens, students take part in workshops on various topics, and lectures with various renowned personalities are held there.

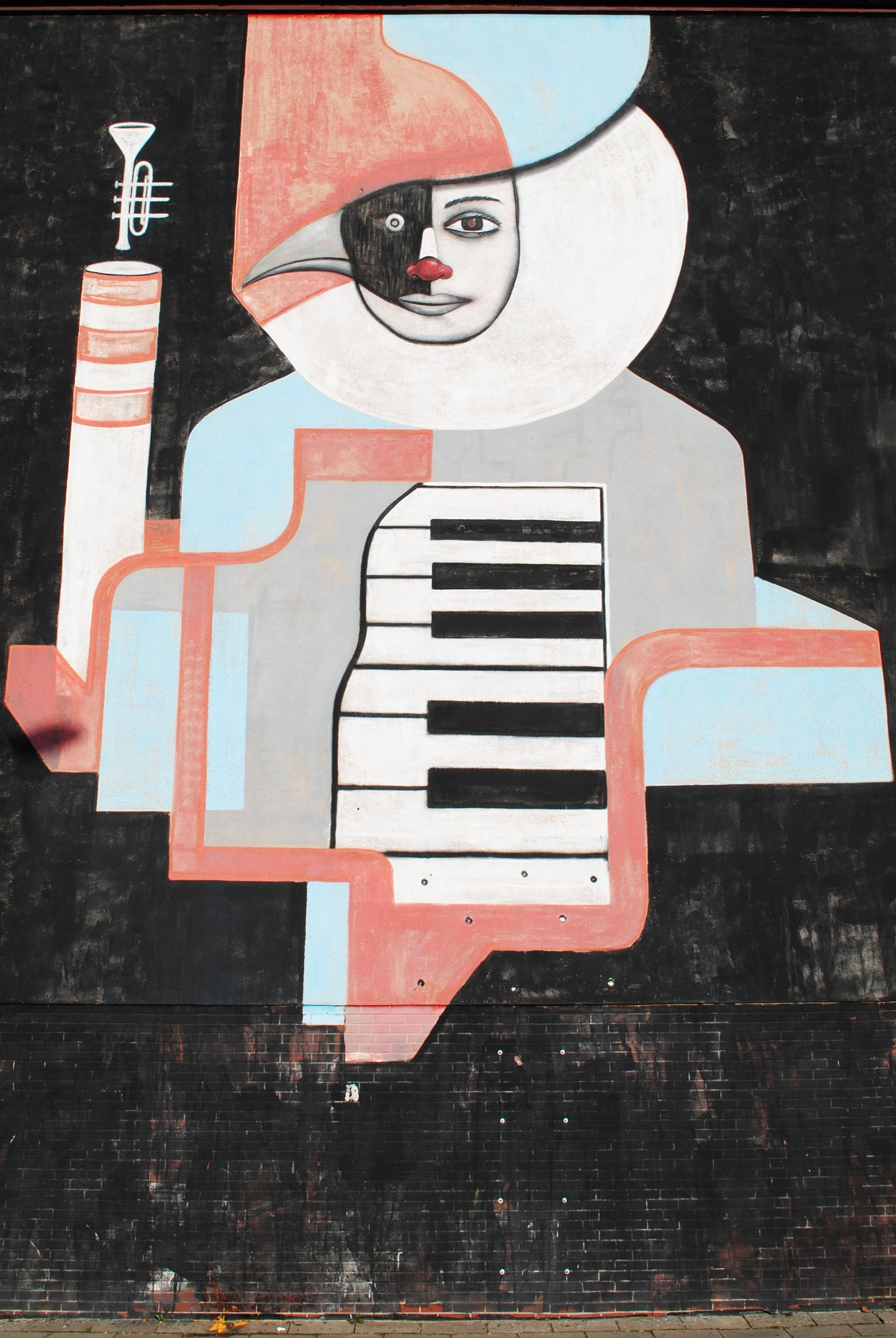
Mural on the wall of the building at 46 Katowicka Street

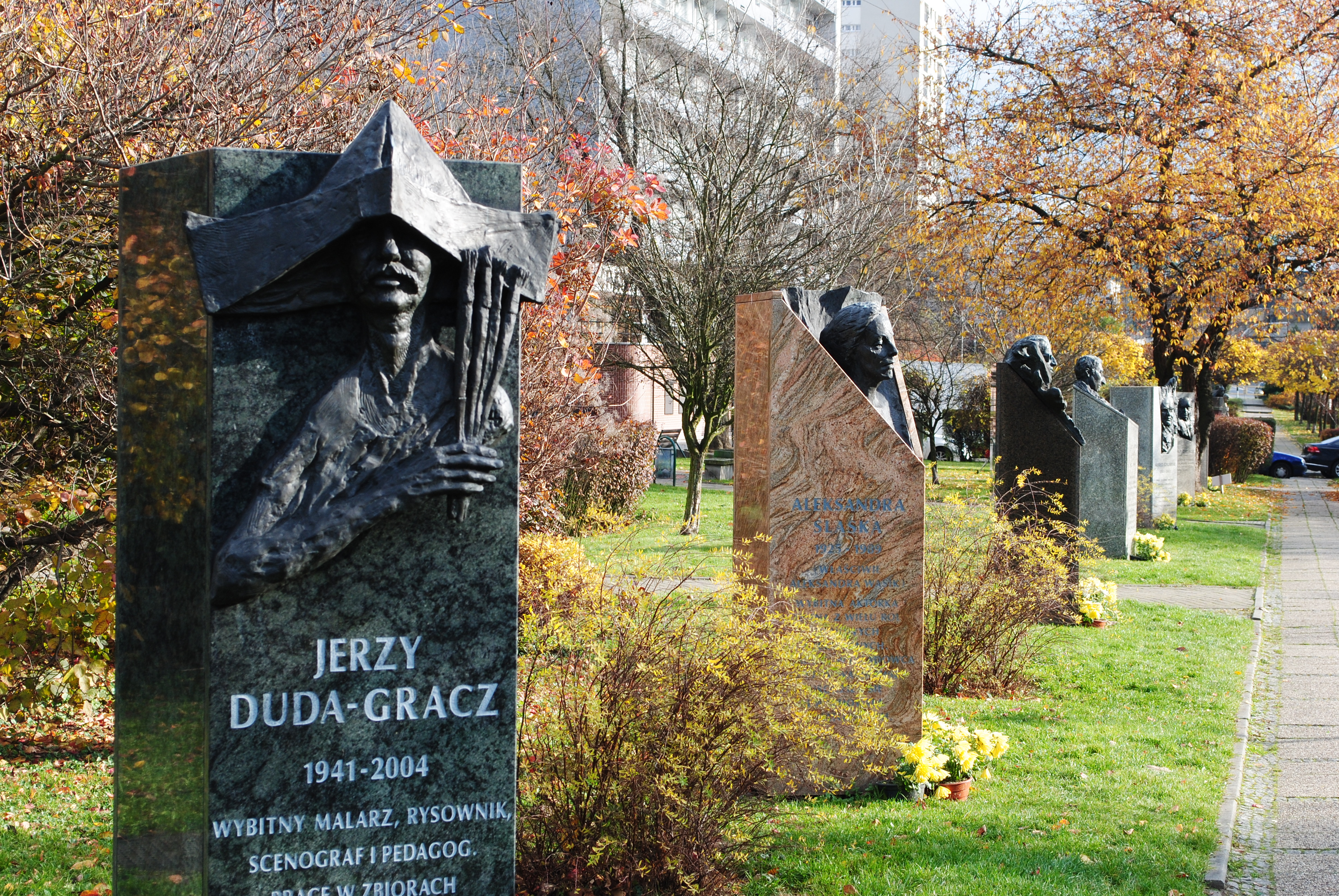
Part of the Artists' Gallery

Another library institution operating in Koszutka is the Józef Lompa Voivodeship Pedagogical Library, located at 7 S. Wyszyński Street. Its establishment is connected with the founding of the Pedagogical Institute in Katowice in 1928, located in present-day Adam Mickiewicz 3rd General High School on A. Mickiewicz Street. The date of 23 November 1928 is considered to be the beginning of the library's activity. In 1946, it operated as the Central Pedagogical Library, located at 9 Szkolna Street, and later took the name Voivodeship Pedagogical Library. It has been located at its current address since 1970.

Near Grunwaldzki Square, there is the Artists' Gallery with sculptures commemorating people who have made the greatest contribution to Katowice in the field of culture. In an annual poll organized among the residents of the city, a person is chosen whose bust is presented in the gallery. The unveiling of a new sculpture takes place in September, together with the organization of celebrations on the anniversary of Katowice being granted city rights. The first bust in the gallery, depicting Zbigniew Cybulski, was unveiled in 2004.

In November 2020, the city authorities initiated the creation of a trail of Katowice murals, most of which were created as part of individual editions of the Katowice Street Art Festival. As of June 2022, the following murals are located within the boundaries of Koszutka:

- 76 W. Korfanty Avenue – one of the first murals in Katowice, created in 2011 by Ronnieism;
- 39a Katowicka Street – a mural from 2021 created by Patryk Hardziej as part of Poland's participation in the Expo 2020 in Dubai;
- 47 Katowicka Street – a mural created in the spring of 2016 by Raspazjan in connection with the Silesian Blues Trail, which was being developed at the same time.

== Religion ==
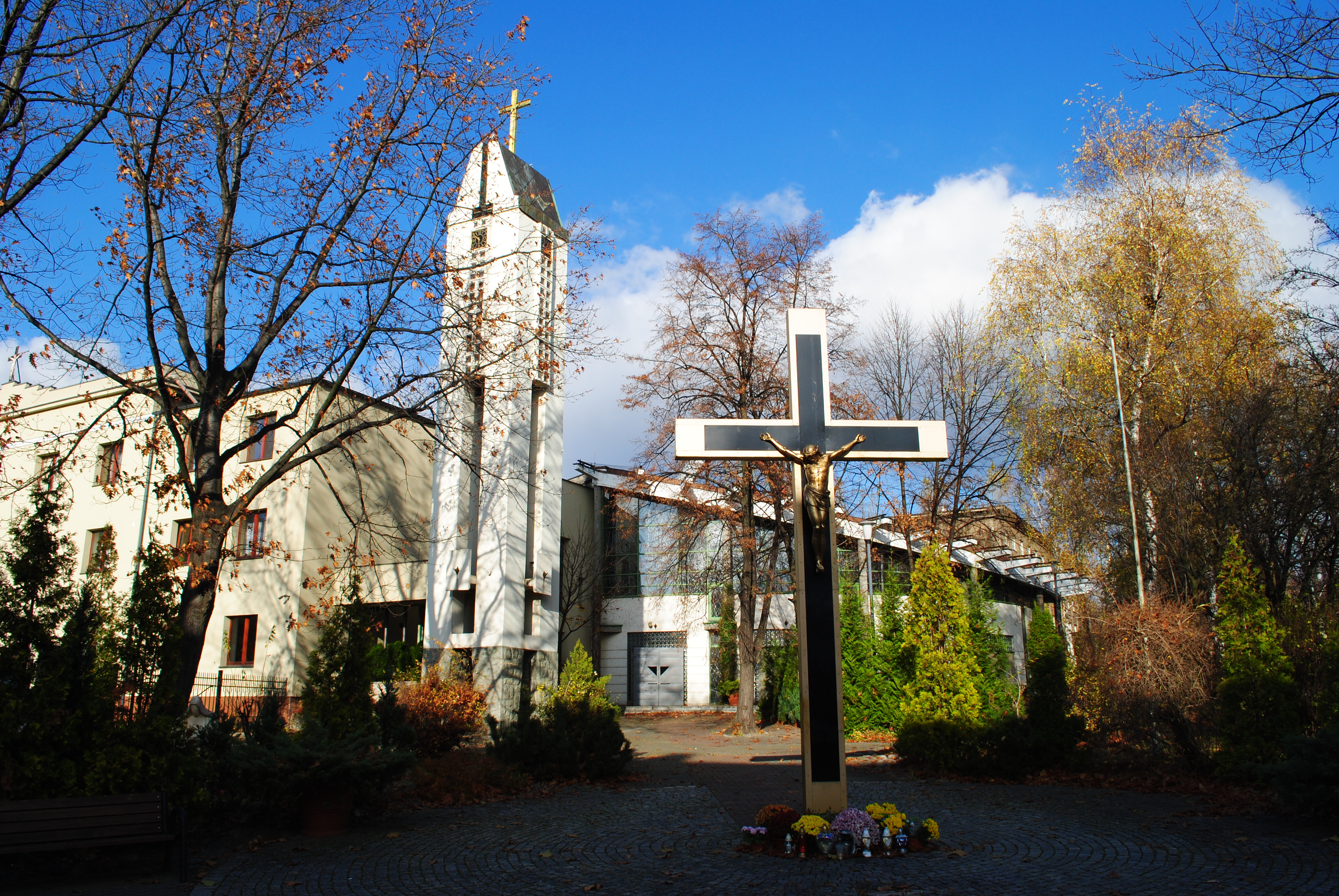
Parish church of the Parish of the Sacred Heart of Jesus

The largest religious community in Koszutka is the Roman Catholic Church. The Parish of the Sacred Heart of Jesus is located at 12 Misjonarzy Oblatów MN Street and belongs to the Katowice-Śródmieście deanery of the Archdiocese of Katowice. The parish covers Koszutka and part of Dąb in Osiedle Ducha. In 2014, it had about 10,500 parishioners.

Originally, the inhabitants of Koszutka belonged to the oldest parish in Katowice, the Parish of St. Stephen in Bogucice. The residents' plans to establish their own parish in the district were realized with the help of the Missionary Oblates of Mary Immaculate, who built a small public chapel dedicated to the Sacred Heart of Jesus next to the monastery in 1937. On 2 December 1939, a local parish was established next to the chapel. It was separated from the parishes in Dąb and Bogucice, covering an area of 1.5 km². The decree confirming the existence of the parish was issued by the Bishop of Katowice, Herbert Bednorz, on 3 December 1984. In 1957 and at the end of the 20th century, the chapels were enlarged, and on 21 May 1999, Archbishop Damian Zimoń consecrated the church in Koszutka.

The Missionary Oblates of Mary Immaculate arrived in Katowice on 15 June 1934, when they opened a missionary house at the Brothers Hospitallers' hospital in Bogucice. In 1936, an opportunity arose to purchase a plot of land in Koszutka. Construction of the church and monastery complex began on 28 August 1936, but only the monastery was built, which was consecrated together with the chapel on 5 September 1937. The monastery was headed by Father Stefan Śmigielski.

Immediately after World War II, 13 Evangelicals lived in Koszutka, and in the 1970s, Jehovah's Witnesses appeared in the district.

== Sport and recreation ==
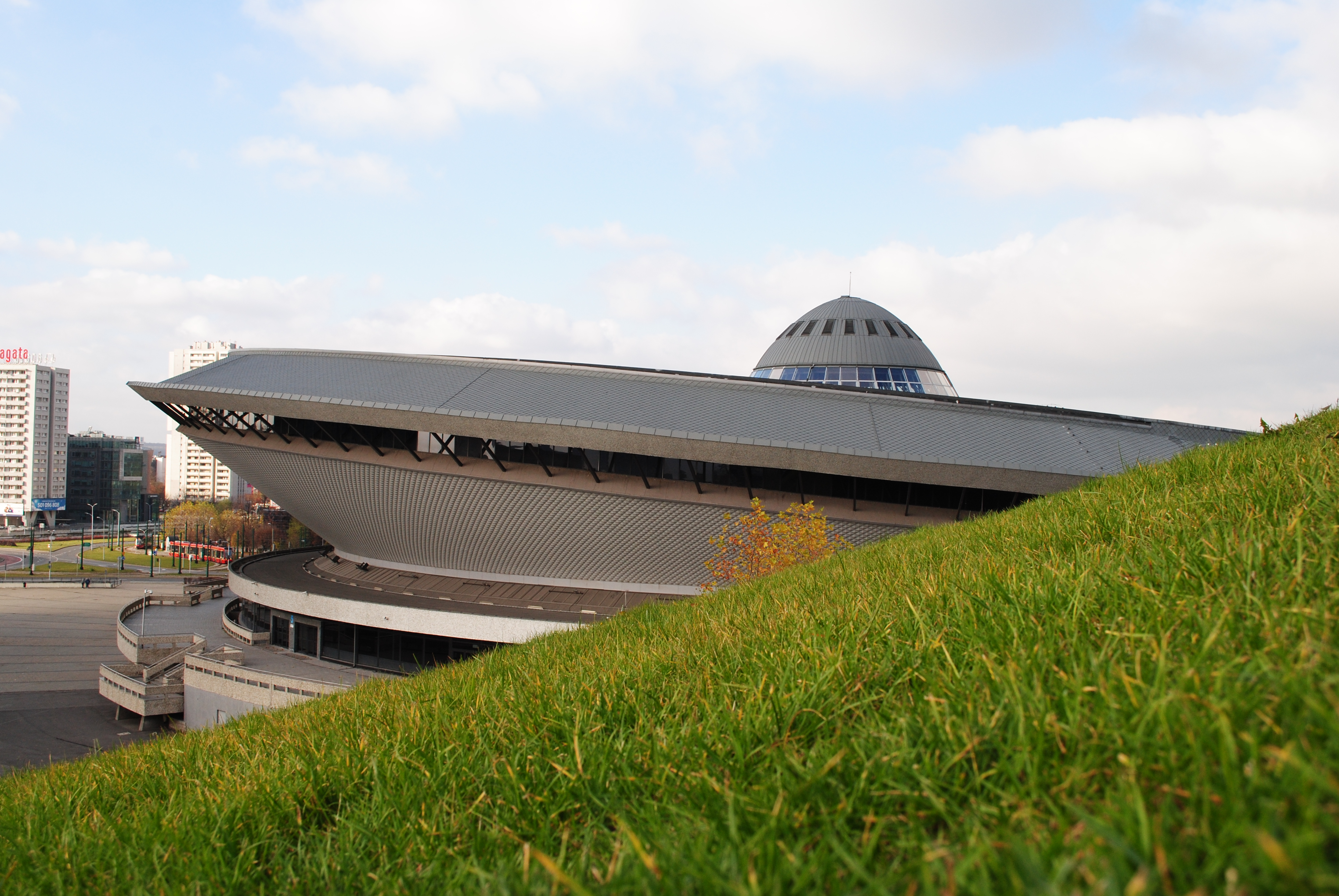
Spodek arena (35 W. Korfanty Avenue)

Sport in Koszutka has been developing since the post-war years. On 27 June 1957, the Koszutka Sports Club was founded. Initially, the club operated as the Górnik No. 22 Sports Club at the Coal Industry Electrical Equipment Assembly Plant. The club had a football section, which played matches in class B. In 1964, it was incorporated into the structures of GKS Katowice. A sports and recreation center was planned for the Wełnowiec Trench area. It was designed in the early 1960s by Marian Skałkowski from Katowice's Miastoprojekt design office and from 1963, it was implemented as part of community service projects. Of the original plans, only the recreational part with a network of alleys, a playground, and a sports field was ultimately completed. In 2007, there were three sports clubs operating in Koszutka.

Located in Koszutka, the Spodek arena, is a multifunctional amphitheater complex with an indoor ice rink and a gymnasium directly adjacent to the main hall. The main hall has 9,351 permanent seats. It is managed by the Municipal Sports and Recreation Center in Katowice. Spodek has hosted a number of European and world-class sporting events, including the 1975 European Athletics Indoor Championships, the 1983 IHF World Women's Handball Championship, the 1985 European Weightlifting Championships, the EuroBasket Women 1999, the EuroBasket 2009, the 2009 Women's European Volleyball Championship, and the 2014 FIVB Men's Volleyball World Championship. During the 2001 FIVB Volleyball World League qualifying rounds and finals held at Spodek, there were almost 50,000 fans in the stands. The arena was officially opened on 8 May 1971. At that time, it was the largest and most modern entertainment and sports facility in Poland.

The Rapid Sports Field is located at 6 J. N. Stęślicki Street. It consists of a large (105 x 68 m) and a small (48 x 31 m) soccer field with artificial turf, equipped with goals and lighting, and the large field also has coaching benches. The pitch has free-standing stands for 306 people, an electronic scoreboard, changing rooms with toilets, and a parking lot. It is managed by the Katowice Municipal Sports and Recreation Center. The Rapid Sports Field underwent comprehensive modernization in 2021. The renovation of the pitch began in October and was completed at the end of December. As part of the work, the artificial turf surface was replaced, the lighting was modernized, and new ball catchers, monitoring, and sound systems were installed. The cost of the work amounted to approximately 3.7 million PLN.

One tourist trail runs through Koszutka:

- Katowice Hiking Trail: Silesian Park – Wełnowiec – Koszutka (J. N. Stęślicki Street – M. Grażyński Street – Sokolska Street) – Śródmieście – Muchowiec – Murcki Valley – Hamerla

== Bibliography ==
- Barciak, Antoni; Chojecka, Ewa; Fertacz, Sylwester, eds. (2012). Katowice. Środowisko, dzieje, kultura, język i społeczeństwo [Katowice: Environment, History, Culture, Language and Society] (in Polish). Vol. 1–2. Katowice: Museum of the History of Katowice. ISBN 978-83-87727-24-6.
- Bartoszek, Adam; Czekaj, Krzysztof; Trawkowska, Dobroniega, eds. (2012). Diagnoza problemów społecznych i monitoring polityki społecznej dla aktywizacji zasobów ludzkich w Katowicach [Diagnosis of Social Problems and Social Policy Monitoring for Human Resource Activation in Katowice] (in Polish). Katowice: University of Silesia. ISBN 978-83-61061-97-7.
- Borowik, Aneta (2019). Nowe Katowice. Forma i ideologia polskiej architektury powojennej na przykładzie Katowic (1945–1980) [New Katowice: Form and Ideology of Polish Post-war Architecture as Exemplified by Katowice (1945–1980)] (in Polish) (1st ed.). Warsaw: Neriton. ISBN 978-83-66018-17-4.
- Bulsa, Michał (2018). Ulice i place Katowic [Streets and Squares of Katowice] (in Polish) (3rd ed.). Katowice: Prasa i Książka. ISBN 978-83-63780-28-9.
- Bulsa, Michał; Grzegorek, Grzegorz; Witaszczyk, Beata (2013). Domy i gmachy Katowic [Houses and Buildings of Katowice] (in Polish). Katowice: Prasa i Książka. ISBN 978-83-63780-00-5.
- Bulsa, Michał; Szmatloch, Barbara (2019). Katowice, których nie ma [Katowice That No Longer Exists] (in Polish). Łódź: Księży Młyn. ISBN 978-83-7729-502-1.
- Drobniak, Adam; Polko, Adam; Plac, Klaudia, eds. (2014). Diagnoza sytuacji społeczno-ekonomicznej Miasta Katowice wraz z wyznaczeniem obszarów rewitalizacji i analizą strategiczną [Diagnosis of the Socio-economic Situation of the City of Katowice together with the Designation of Regeneration Areas and Strategic Analysis] (PDF) (in Polish). Katowice: City of Katowice.
- Frużyński, Adam; Grzegorek, Grzegorz; Rygus, Piotr (2017). Kopalnie i huty Katowic [Mines and Ironworks of Katowice] (in Polish). Katowice: Prasa i Książka. ISBN 978-83-63780-23-4.
- Dulias, Renata; Hibszer, Adam, eds. (2008). Górnośląski Związek Metropolitalny. Zarys geograficzny [Upper Silesian Metropolitan Union: A Geographical Outline] (in Polish). Sosnowiec: Katowice Branch of the Polish Geographical Society. ISBN 978-83-61695-00-4.
- Grzegorek, Grzegorz; Tabaczyński, Piotr (2014). Parafie i kościoły Katowic [Parishes and Churches of Katowice] (in Polish). Katowice: Prasa i Książka. ISBN 978-83-63780-06-7.
- Drobek, Daria; Michalska, Ewa; Radecki, Ryszard; Perdyła, Magdalena (January 2014). Opracowanie ekofizjograficzne podstawowe z elementami opracowania ekofizjograficznego problemowego (problematyka ochrony dolin rzecznych oraz ograniczeń dla zagospodarowania terenu wynikających z wpływu działalności górniczej) dla potrzeb opracowania projektów miejscowych planów zagospodarowania przestrzennego obszarów położonych w mieście Katowice [Basic Ecophysiographic Study with Elements of a Problem-Oriented Ecophysiographic Study (Issues of River Valley Protection and Constraints on Land Development Resulting from the Impact of Mining Activity) for the Purposes of Preparing Draft Local Spatial Development Plans for Areas Located within the City of Katowice] (in Polish). Katowice: Werona.
- "Raport o stanie miasta Katowice 2013" [Report on the State of the City of Katowice 2013] (PDF). katowice.eu (in Polish). 2014.
- Soida, Krzysztof (1995). Koleje wąskotorowe na Górnym Śląsku [Narrow-gauge Railways in Upper Silesia] (in Polish). Vol. I. Katowice: Śląsk. ISBN 83-85831-82-7.
- Steuer, Antoni (2022). "Leksykon bogucki" [Bogucice Lexicon]. mhk.katowice.pl (in Polish). Archived from the original on 15 May 2021.
- Zemła, Marek, ed. (25 April 2012). Studium uwarunkowań i kierunków zagospodarowania przestrzennego miasta Katowice – II edycja. Część 1. Uwarunkowania zagospodarowania przestrzennego [Study of the Conditions and Directions of Spatial Development of the City of Katowice – Second Edition. Part One. Conditions of Spatial Development] (PDF) (in Polish). Katowice: Biuro Rozwoju Regionu.
- Szaraniec, Lech (1996). Osady i osiedla Katowic [Settlements and Housing Estates of Katowice] (in Polish). Katowice: Artur. ISBN 83-905115-0-9.
