= Wełnowiec-Józefowiec =

District of Katowice, Poland

- Katowice District
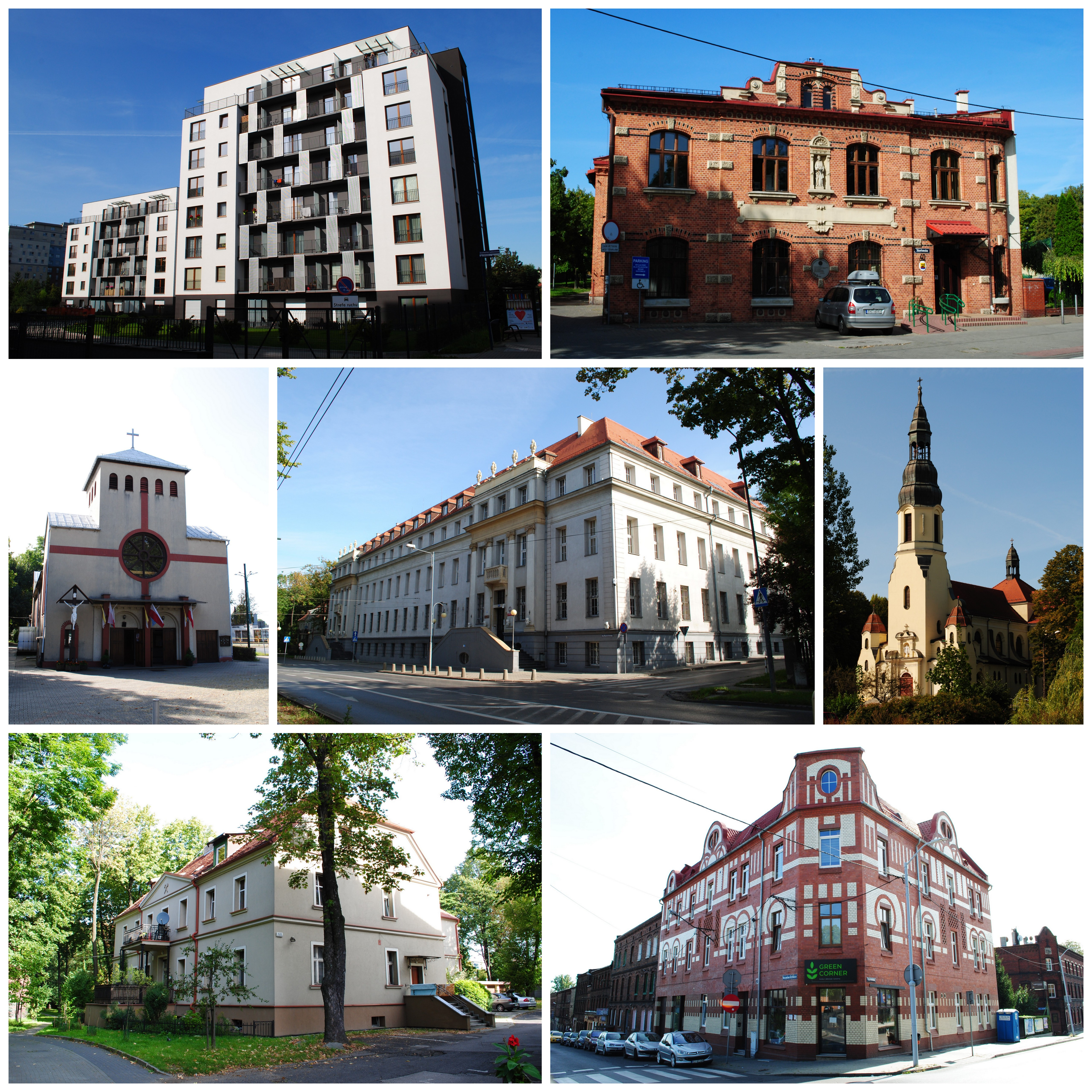
- Osiedle Nowa Słoneczna, Józefowska Sports Hall, Church of Our Lady Help of Christians in Wełnowiec, the historic Court of Appeal building on Wojciech Korfanty Avenue, Church of St. Joseph the Worker in Józefowiec, house on W. Korfanty Avenue, apartment buildings at the corner of M. Karłowicz and Józefowska streets

- Location of Wełnowiec-Józefowiec within Katowice
- Coordinates: 50°16′48.575″N 19°01′13″E
- Country: Poland
- Voivodeship: Silesian
- County/City: Katowice
- Established: 1 January 1992

Area
  - Total: 3.15 km^{2} (1.22 sq mi)
- Elevation: 270–315 m (886–1,033 ft)

Population (2020)
  - Total: 13,741
  - Density: 4,360/km^{2} (11,300/sq mi)
- Time zone: UTC+1 (CET)
  - Summer (DST): UTC+2 (CEST)
- Area code: (+48) 032

Wełnowiec-Józefowiec (German: Hohenlohehütte-Josephsdorf) is a district of Katowice, located in the northern part of the city, on the Chorzów Hills. Its boundaries largely correspond to those of the historical Gmina Wełnowiec, while the district itself consists of two main historical settlements: Wełnowiec (German: Hohenlohehütte) and Józefowiec (German: Josephsdorf), as well as several workers' colonies, including Alfred, Agnieszka, and Fryderyka.

The first records of settlement in Wełnowiec-Józefowiec date back to the 17th century. Initially, Wełnowiec was mainly agricultural, but thanks to shallow deposits of coal, mining began to develop, and the first mine was established there at the end of the 18th century. Later, the metallurgical industry also became established. One of the largest zinc smelters in Upper Silesia – the Hohenlohe Zinc Smelter, built in 1873 – was founded there (later known as the Silesia Metallurgical Works). Józefowiec was founded in 1826 and incorporated into Gmina Wełnowiec in 1924, which itself became a part of Katowice in 1951.

Today, Wełnowiec-Józefowiec is mainly a residential area with a well-developed industrial sector (home to companies such as Fasing and ZPUE). The main thoroughfare of the district is Wojciech Korfanty Avenue, connecting Śródmieście with Siemianowice Śląskie. A tram line also runs along the avenue. In 2020, Wełnowiec-Józefowiec had a population of 13,741.

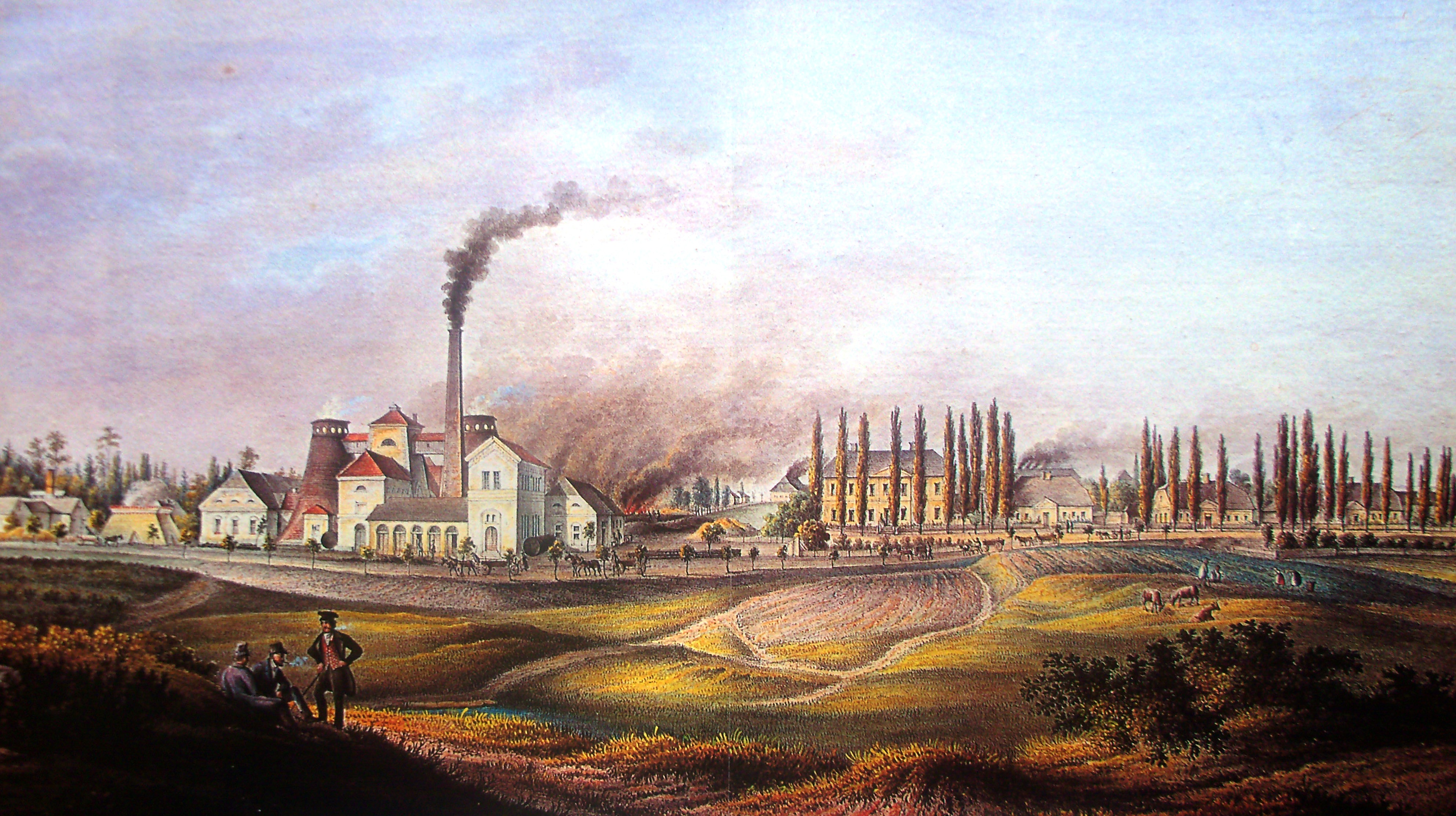
Hohenlohehütte in Wełnowiec, a picture from the 19th century

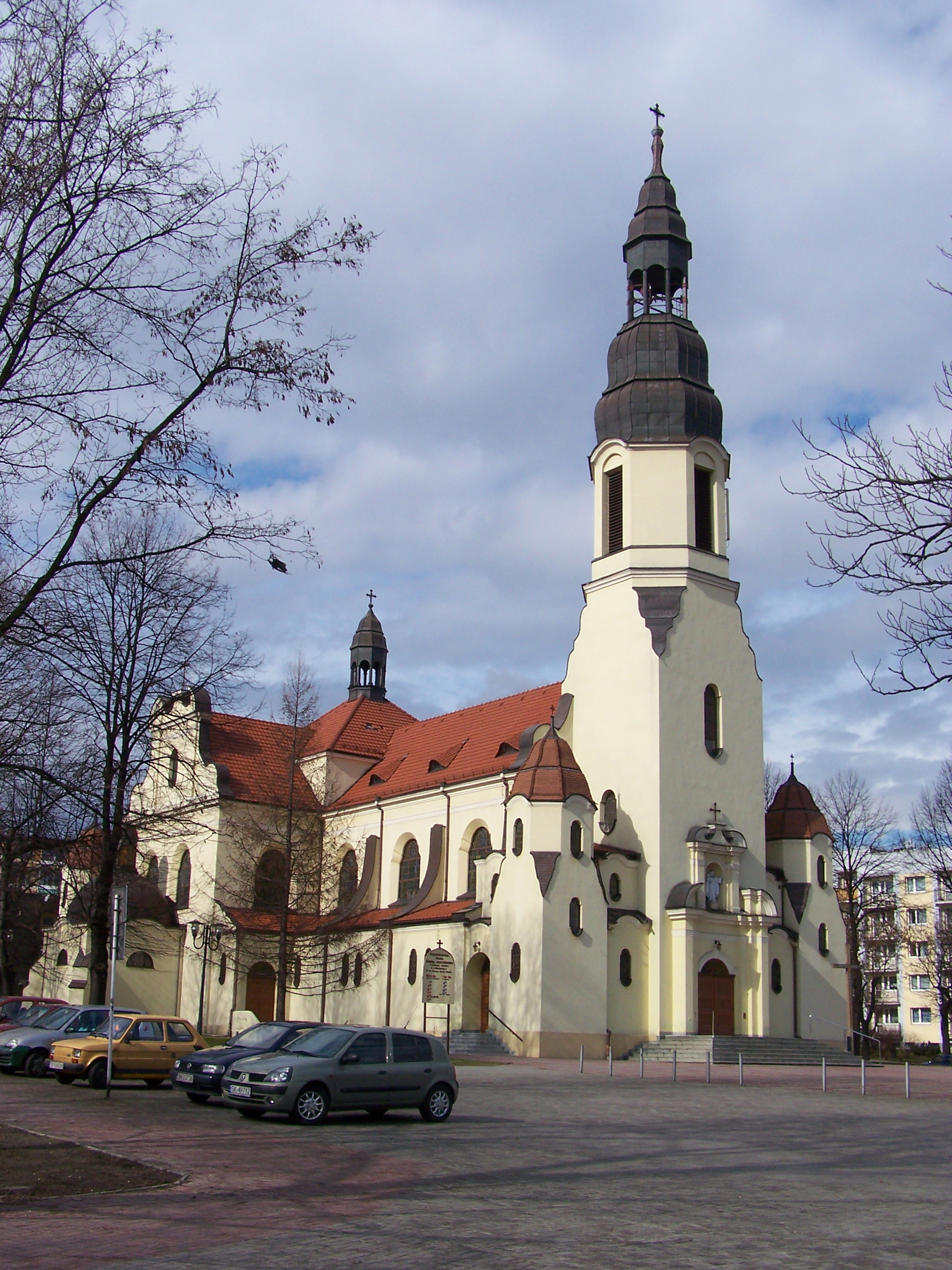
Church of St. Joseph in Józefowiec

== Geography ==
=== Location ===
Administratively, Wełnowiec-Józefowiec is located in the Silesian Voivodeship and is one of the districts of Katowice (no. 11), situated in the northern part of the city, approximately 3 km north of its center. It borders Siemianowice Śląskie to the north and east, three other districts of Katowice to the south – Bogucice (a short section east of Cedrowa Street), Koszutka, and Dąb – and Silesian Park in Chorzów to the west. The district's boundaries are:

- from the north – it simultaneously forms the boundary between Katowice and Siemianowice Śląskie, running along Telewizyjna Street;
- from the east – a continuation of the boundary between Katowice and Siemianowice Śląskie;
- from the south – from the border between Katowice and Siemianowice Śląskie, it follows Cedrowa Street. Further on, the border is formed by Jesionowa and Słoneczna streets (at the latter, south of the main roadway, encompassing the buildings on both sides within the boundaries of Wełnowiec-Józefowiec) to the intersection with C. K. Norwid Street, then it turns southwest, following the route of the former sand railway tracks to Piotr Ściegienny Street;
- from the west – northward along P. Ściegienny Street, then west along Krzyżowa Street and, at the Dąb branch of the Koszutka Municipal Cultural Center, it runs north, bypassing the buildings on Agnieszki Street to the east. At the intersection with J. Mikusiński Street, the boundary between Wełnowiec and Józefowiec forms the border between Katowice and Chorzów, which continues north along Bytkowska Street to the junction with Telewizyjna Street.

According to Jerzy Kondracki's physio-geographical regionalization, the entire district is located in the Katowice Upland mesoregion, which forms the southern part of the Silesian Upland, itself a part of the Silesian-Kraków Upland subprovince. In terms of historical regions, Wełnowiec-Józefowiec is located in the eastern part of Upper Silesia.

=== Geology ===
In terms of geological structure, Wełnowiec-Józefowiec is located in the Upper Silesian Sinkhole in an area with horst structures. At the turn of the Devonian and Carboniferous periods, the Paleozoic bedrock of the Silesian Upland was disturbed by the formation of a sinkhole, which during the Carboniferous was filled with conglomerates, sandstones, and shales containing bituminous coal deposits, formed 300 million years ago on the peat-covered shores of vast shallow lakes. The oldest Carboniferous strata, whose outcrops occur in the Katowice area and are also present in Wełnowiec-Józefowiec, include the Grodziec (Poręba) strata (Namurian A). They occur in the form of isolated patches. In Józefowiec, these strata are characterized by a predominance of shale over sandstone and contain up to 20 thin coal seams, several of which exceed 1 m in thickness. The Grodziec layers cover the western part of Józefowiec – west of Józefowska Street and the area of the former ZM Silesia. In the area of the so-called voivodeship colony on Bytomska Street and east of the former steelworks, saddle layers are present, and along the border with Siemianowice Śląskie and near the border with Koszutka, Ruda layers are found.

The main characteristics of the Wełnowiec-Józefowiec landscape were formed during the Tertiary period. At that time, intense chemical weathering and denudation were taking place, and rocks of various ages were eroded. Orogenic movements also influenced the landscape. In the Pliocene, the main features of the terrain were already similar to those of today. West of the former Wełnowiec Stream, along present-day Józefowska Street, the district's area is composed of Pleistocene sandy eluvium and silty till.

In the Quaternary, Wełnowiec-Józefowiec was likely covered by the Scandinavian ice sheet twice: during the oldest Mindel glaciation and during the Riss glaciation. Sediments from the earlier glaciation were removed during the interglacial. In the Holocene, Pleistocene deposits were eroded, especially in river valleys, and young erosional valleys formed on the slopes. Rivers created low terraces in several stages as a result of cutting through the aggradation deposits. After the deforestation of the slopes, increased soil denudation began. Holocene river deposits extend parallel to the west up to the present-day Wojciech Korfanty Avenue.

=== Terrain ===
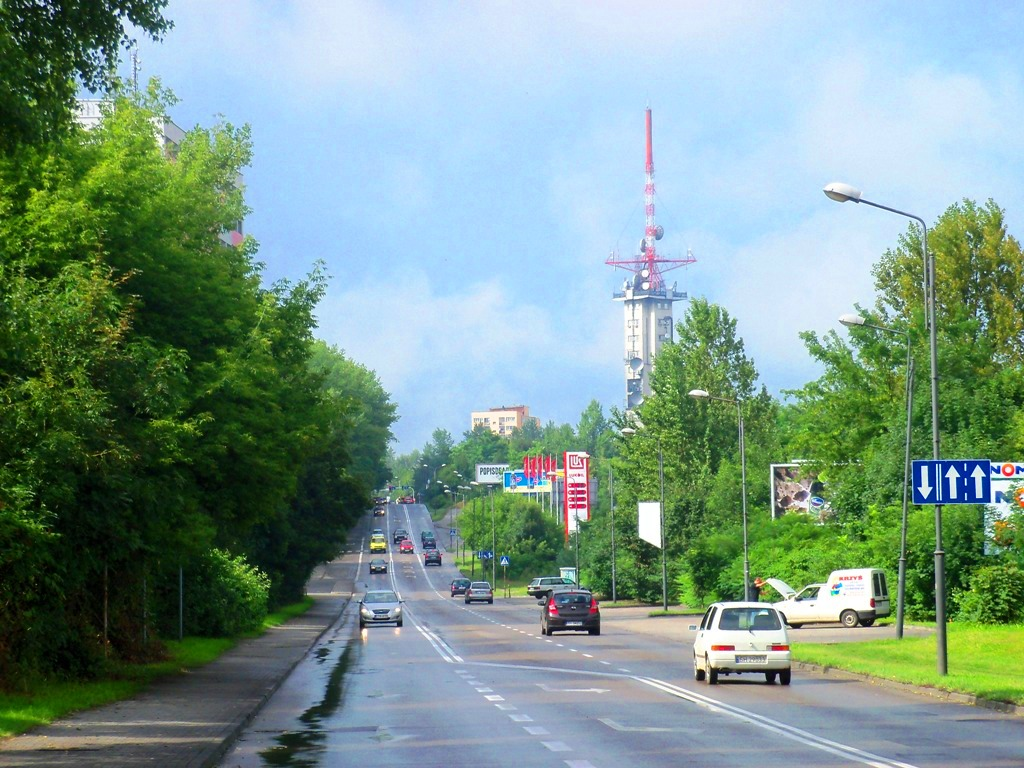
Bytkowska Street in 2010; view looking north toward the tripoint where the borders of Katowice, Siemianowice Śląskie, and Chorzów meet, in the vicinity of which lies the highest elevation of Wełnowiec-Józefowiec

Wełnowiec-Józefowiec is located in the southern part of the Silesian Upland, within the Katowice Upland mesoregion. The district is characterized by relatively significant variation in its topography. The highest point is located on the border between Katowice and Siemianowice Śląskie, at the site of the Bytków TV Tower – it reaches an elevation of 316 m above sea level. From this point, the terrain slopes southward along Wojciech Korfanty Avenue and Józefowska Street. Areas above 300 m above sea level also include parts of the Agnieszka Colony, a section of Wełnowiecki Park, and the tram terminus near Alfred Square. The lowest point (approximately 270 m above sea level) is located on the border of Wełnowiec-Józefowiec and Dąb at Józefowska Street. The elevation difference between the lowest and highest points of the district is 45 meters.

Geomorphologically, the entire Wełnowiec-Józefowiec area is located on the Chorzów Hills, which are part of the Bytom Plateau. They form a series of undulating, rounded, or flattened elevations. Toward the Rawa river valley, they are cut by valley depressions, including, the Wełnowiec ditch within the district with its fairly steep slopes and flat bottoms.

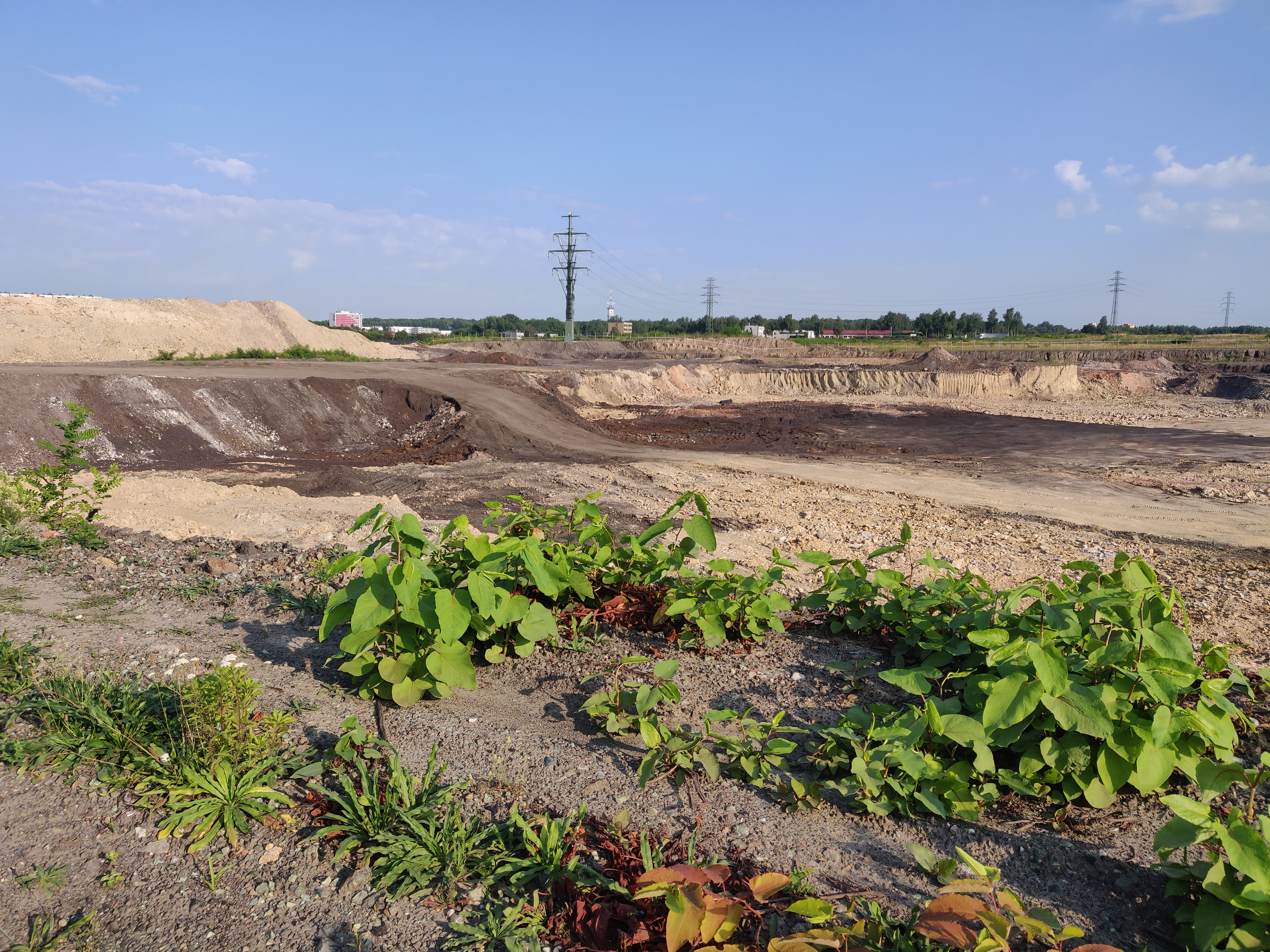
Post-smelter terrain in the area of Konduktorska Street; ruderal vegetation visible in the foreground

Wełnowiec-Józefowiec has been heavily altered by human activity due to settlement, industry, and the legacy of former zinc smelting operations. The area contains both spoil tips and post-mining subsidence, which reaches up to 6 meters in the district. In the vicinity of Konduktorska Street, there is a disused smelter waste dump, created by the now-defunct zinc smelter, colloquially known as the Wełnowiec Alps. Additionally, the area has man-made landforms in the form of road and railway embankments. Almost the entire district has been anthropogenically leveled.

=== Soils ===
In Wełnowiec-Józefowiec, the soils have been significantly altered by human activity, resulting in the formation of anthrosols, for which human activity is the main soil-forming factor. Throughout the entire district, these soils developed from sandstones and, due to urban development and industrial activity, have been largely devastated and degraded. They are also contaminated with heavy metals (including those located in forested areas at the leaf litter level).

Class III and IV soils predominate in Wełnowiec-Józefowiec. Within the classified area of the district, Class III soils are found in the vicinity of Bytkowska Street near the Bytkowska Park housing estate, and Class IV soils are present near the Agnieszka Colony and Walenty Fojkis Square.

=== Climate ===
The climate of Wełnowiec-Józefowiec does not differ significantly from that of Katowice as a whole, but it is modified by local factors. The area has a transitional temperate climate, with oceanic air currents predominating over continental ones. Westerly winds dominate (accounting for about 60% of the total), with easterly and southerly winds playing a lesser role. The average annual temperature for the 1961–2005 period at the station in was 8.1°C, though the urban heat island effect is also noticeable there, which locally modifies the air temperature. The warmest month is July (17.8 °C), and the coldest is January (–2.2 °C). The average annual sunshine duration for the 1966–2005 period was 1,474 hours, and the average annual precipitation for the 1951–2005 period was 713.8 mm.

The microclimate of Wełnowiec-Józefowiec depends on the degree of forest cover, urbanization, and its location relative to river valleys. The entire district lies within the microclimate of developed, higher-elevation valleys, where conditions are generally favorable. With dense buildings and paved areas, the air heats up more quickly during the day and, with lower humidity, loses heat more quickly.

=== Surface and groundwater ===
Wełnowiec-Józefowiec is located entirely within the Vistula drainage basin, in the basin of two rivers: the Brynica (a small, eastern part of the district bordering Siemianowice Śląskie) and the Rawa. A fourth-order drainage divide runs between these two areas. Neither the Rawa nor the Brynica flows directly through Wełnowiec-Józefowiec. The only body of water in the district is a pond at the intersection of Konduktorska Street and Wojciech Korfanty Avenue, located in the Rawa drainage basin.

According to B. Paczyński’s 1995 regionalization, Wełnowiec-Józefowiec is located within the XII Silesian-Kraków hydrogeological region. Aquifers occur in all stratigraphic series there, but their significance depends on several factors, both natural and human-related. The district lies within the boundaries of Groundwater Body No. 111. One of the Main Groundwater Reservoirs – No. 329 Bytom – is located beneath Wełnowiec-Józefowiec across its entire area. It carries fissure-karst-porous water within a profile of Triassic carbonate rocks. However, there are no exploitable levels within the city limits. The thickness of the aquifer is estimated at 40–250 m, and the average depth of the intakes at 60 m.

=== Nature and environmental protection ===
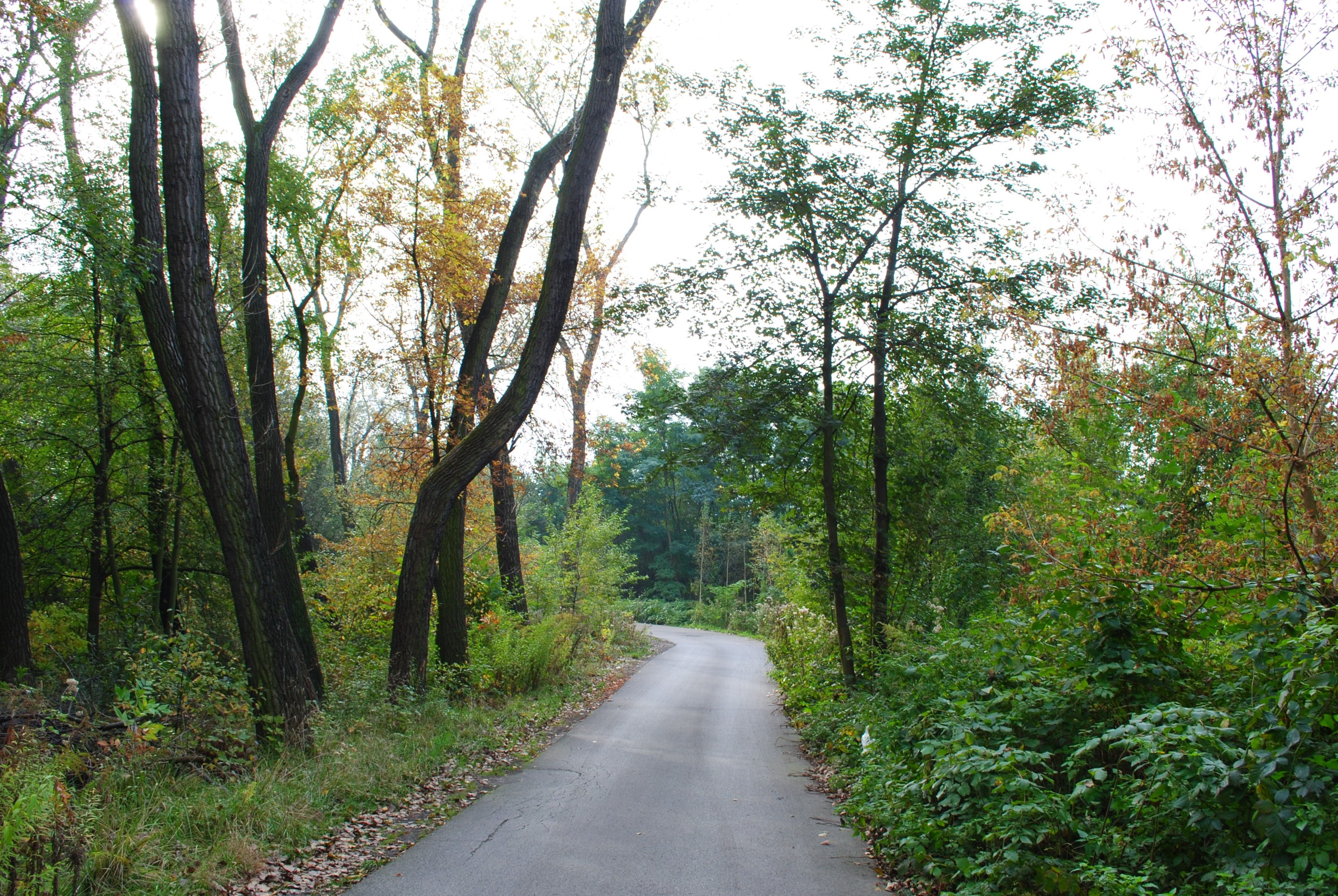
Part of Alfred Grove, a forest with features of a natural forest

The original, natural vegetation in Wełnowiec-Józefowiec has been developing since the last glaciations, which occurred 12,000–16,000 years ago. Its abundance was influenced by, among other factors, the terrain, the river network, and water resources, and, over the last 200 years, to the greatest extent by human activity. Originally, the higher-elevation areas of the district were covered by beech forests, while the valley of the now-extinct Wełnowiecki Stream was home to hornbeam-oak forests, which were destroyed as a result of the development of mining and metallurgy. Before the anthropogenic impact on the present-day Wełnowiec-Józefowiec, the areas of the Silesian Forest were abundant in animals, including large mammals such as bisons, aurochs, mooses, brown bears, wildcats, and wolves, and among birds – capercaillies. With the development of settlement, these animals, considered pests from a human perspective, were exterminated, and with the development of agriculture, animals associated with open areas appeared.

The district has been largely urbanized, resulting in a limited amount of green space, which mainly consists of man-made green areas (such as family allotment gardens, parks, cemeteries, squares, and recreational areas). Among the larger spaces of wooded and undeveloped green space in Wełnowiec-Józefowiec are Alfred Grove in Wełnowiec and the vicinity of Wełnowiecki Park.

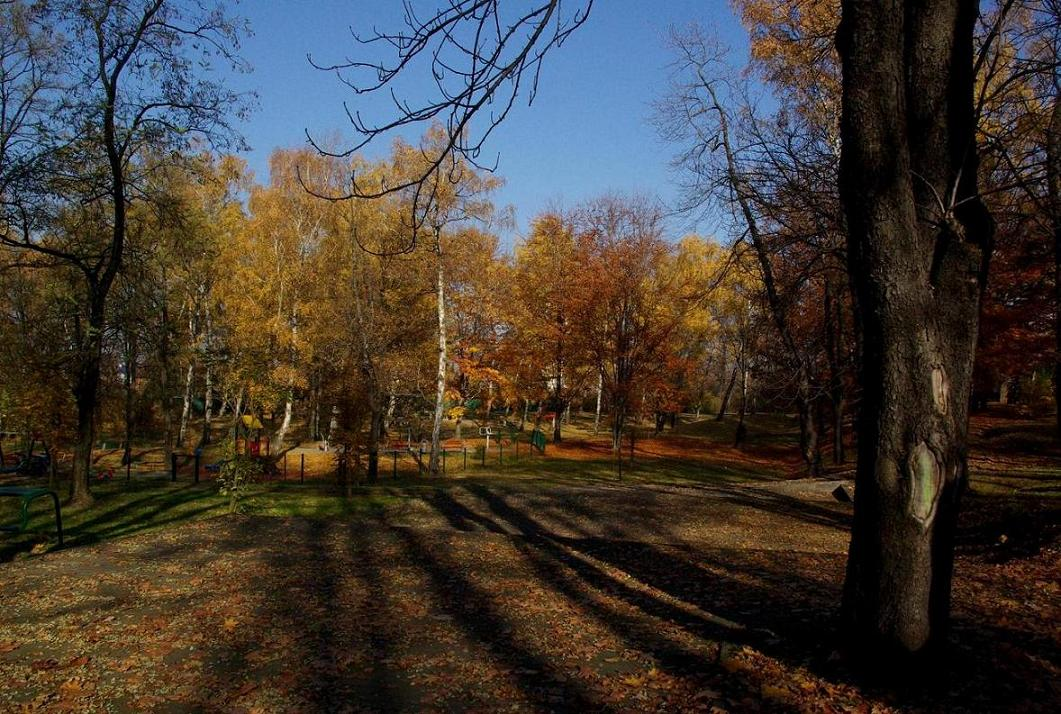
Part of Wełnowiecki Park in 2011

The potential vegetation in Wełnowiec-Józefowiec consists of subcontinental linden-oak-hornbeam forests – the Lesser Poland variant with beech and fir (upland form, nutrient-poor series). Today, in the devastated and transformed areas, synanthropic vegetation predominates, found in ruderal habitats, including mugwort and burdock, while trampled areas are covered by carpet-like communities of broadleaf plantain and ryegrass. In terms of fauna, species typical of human habitats are found there, such as the house sparrow and rock dove, as well as jackdaws, magpies, blackbirds, rooks, and starlings. In allotment gardens, cemeteries, and landscaped urban green spaces, the most common birds are tits, jays, starlings, chaffinches, and blackbirds.

There are no designated nature conservation areas in Wełnowiec-Józefowiec, but the landscaped green spaces have historic trees and avenues, including one natural monument established by a resolution of the Katowice City Council of 1 June 2017 – a European beech in Wełnowiecki Park, 22 m tall with a breast height circumference of 249 cm. The following landscaped green areas are also found there:

- Wełnowiecki Park – a park with an area of 4.18 ha;
- Walenty Fojkis Square – established on 25 July 2012.

== History ==
=== Origins and industrial development ===
The first records concerning the areas of present-day Wełnowiec-Józefowiec date back to the 17th century. In 1689, an entry appears in the register of Parish of St. Stephen in Bogucice: Blasius Welna molitor de Kosic ("Błażej Wełna of Koszutka"). He was the owner of a mill located on a stream called Wełna or Wełnianka, which flowed through Koszutka and then into the Rawa. In the northeastern part of present-day Wełnowiec-Józefowiec, on the edge of the Bytków Grove, at the behest of Ignacy von Kloch – then-owner of Bytków – a colony of 10 houses was established in 1773, and each farmstead was allocated 3 morgen of land. This settlement was named Ignatzdorf (Ignacowiec) after its founder. The name Wełnowiec was later extended to the newly established colony.

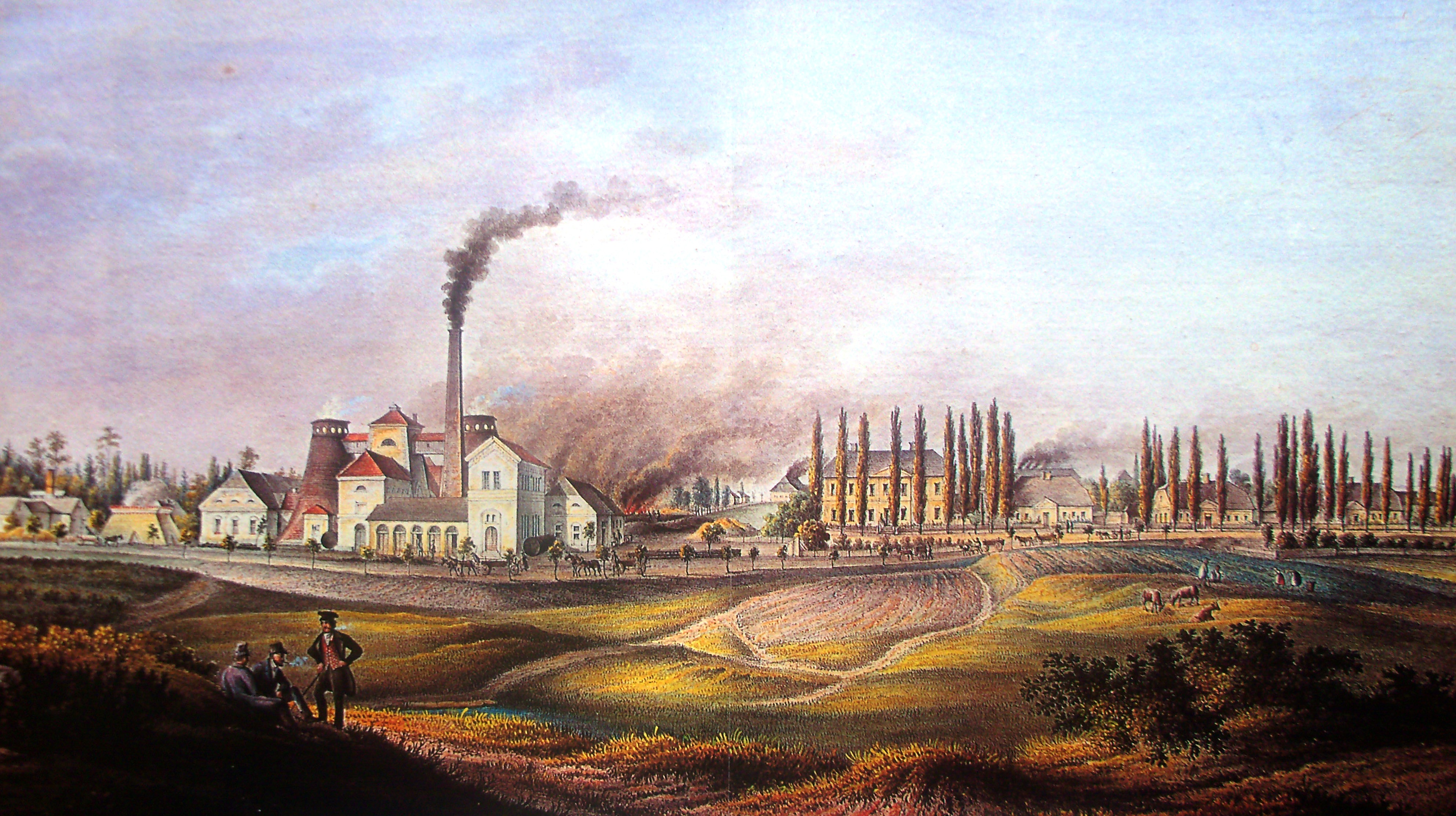
Hohenlohe Zinc Smelter in a mid-19th century lithograph by Ernest Knippel

The settlement was initially agricultural in nature, and some of its inhabitants also engaged in crafts. In 1780, the colony had a population of 43. Further development of present-day Wełnowiec-Józefowiec was initiated by coal mining, which flourished there due to the shallow coal seams. In 1788, the first mine, Caroline, was established. In 1796, the Bytków manor, which also included Wełnowiec, was purchased from the von Kloch family by Prince Friedrich Ludwig. Based on an agreement from 1805, the Hohenlohe Ironworks was built, with construction completed in 1819. In the first half of the 19th century, new coal mines were opened: August, Maria, Alfred, and Hütte. In 1821, the Helena Zinc Smelter was established.

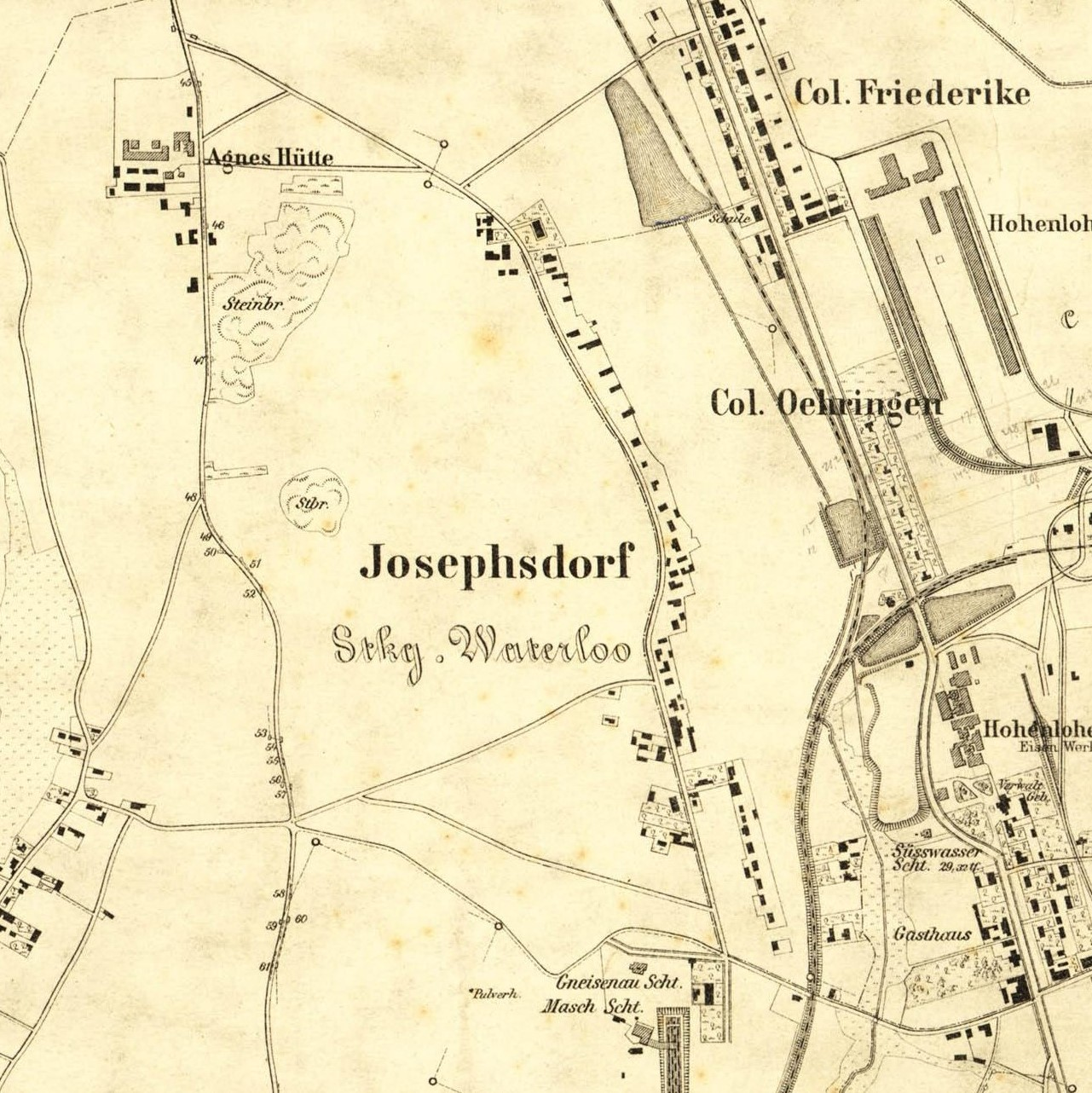
Józefowiec together with the surrounding colonies: Agnieszka, Fryderyka, and Öhringen, on a map from 1880

Józefowiec was founded in 1826, when Father Józef Beder – parson of the Chorzów Parish of St. Mary Magdalene – purchased land to the west and north of Dąb from Prince Friedrich Ludwig, on which he subsequently established two colonies: Bederowiec and Józefowiec, within the territory of the then-Gmina Dąb. An inn and 30 cottages were built in Józefowiec at that time, each allocated two morgen of land. By 1845, the village already had 35 houses and a population of 312. In 1865, Józefowiec had a population of 598, and the settlement was situated along the present-day Józefowska Street.

In 1828, a Catholic school was opened in Wełnowiec. In 1867, 1,642 people lived there. In the 1840s, a settlement was established for the workers of the Agnes Zinc Smelter, originally called Huta Agnieszki Colony. The smelter itself was launched in 1842. The Hohenlohe Zinc Smelter was opened on 1 March 1873 on the site of the defunct August-Helena smelter, while a modern zinc rolling mill was built in 1889. In 1873, Wełnowiec, together with Józefowiec, became part of the Prussian Katowice County. In 1859 and 1875, the first strikes by workers in the zinc and coal industries in Upper Silesia were recorded in Wełnowiec. In 1880, a post office was opened there, which is still located at 128 Wojciech Korfanty Avenue. The management of Prince Hohenlohe's industrial plants was also moved to Wełnowiec; in 1905, they were transformed into the Hohenlohe-Werke joint-stock company. That same year, Christian Kraft, then the owner of the facilities in Wełnowiec, sold his plants to the Hohenlohe-Werke company. In 1890, a metallurgical hospital began operating on the present-day Józefowska Street. Along with the development of industry in Wełnowiec, new buildings were also constructed in neighboring Józefowiec (including, among others, two public schools, currently located at 32 and 52 Józefowska Street). In 1890, Józefowiec had a population of 1,300. From 1875 to 1894, the village was a separate gmina, after which it became part of Gmina Dąb on 1 April 1894 (then known as Gmina Dąb-Józefowiec).

=== Interwar period and World War II ===
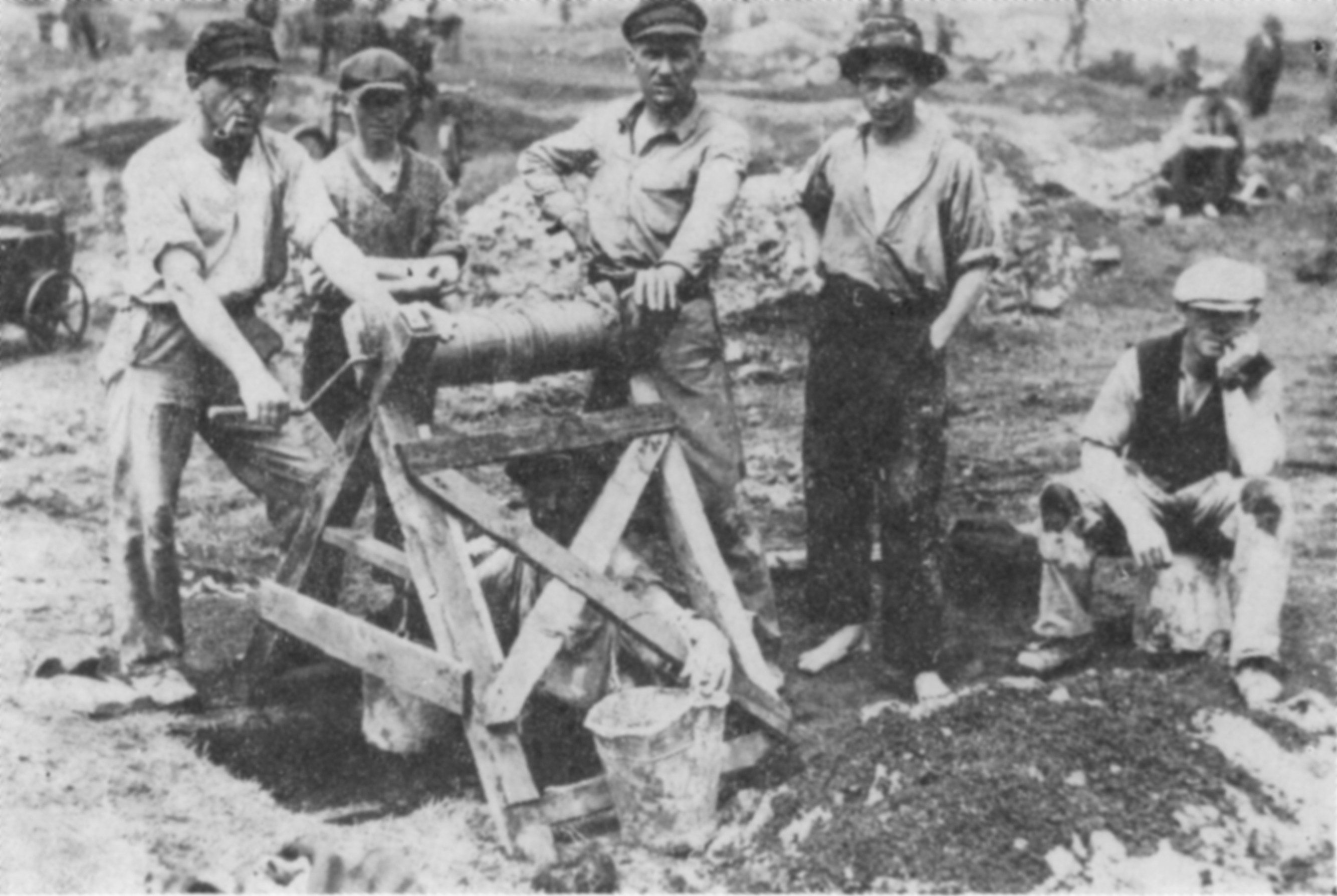
Digging of bootleg mine shafts in Wełnowiec; photograph from around 1930

The residents of Józefowiec and Wełnowiec took an active part in the Silesian Uprisings. Walenty Fojkis, commander of the Katowice Regiment during the Third Silesian Uprising and mayor of Michałkowice in the interwar period, was born in Wełnowiec. On the night of 17–18 August 1919, insurgents from Dąb and Józefowiec gathered to attack German outposts in the Agnieszka Colony and Wełnowiec. During the 1921 plebiscite in Wełnowiec and Bytków, 643 people of Józefowiec and Wełnowiec voted for Upper Silesia to remain part of Germany, while 298 voted for it to belong to Poland; in Gmina Dąb-Józefowiec, 54% of residents voted for annexation to Poland. During the Third Silesian Uprising, insurgents from Józefowiec joined the battalion of Rudolf Niemczyk.

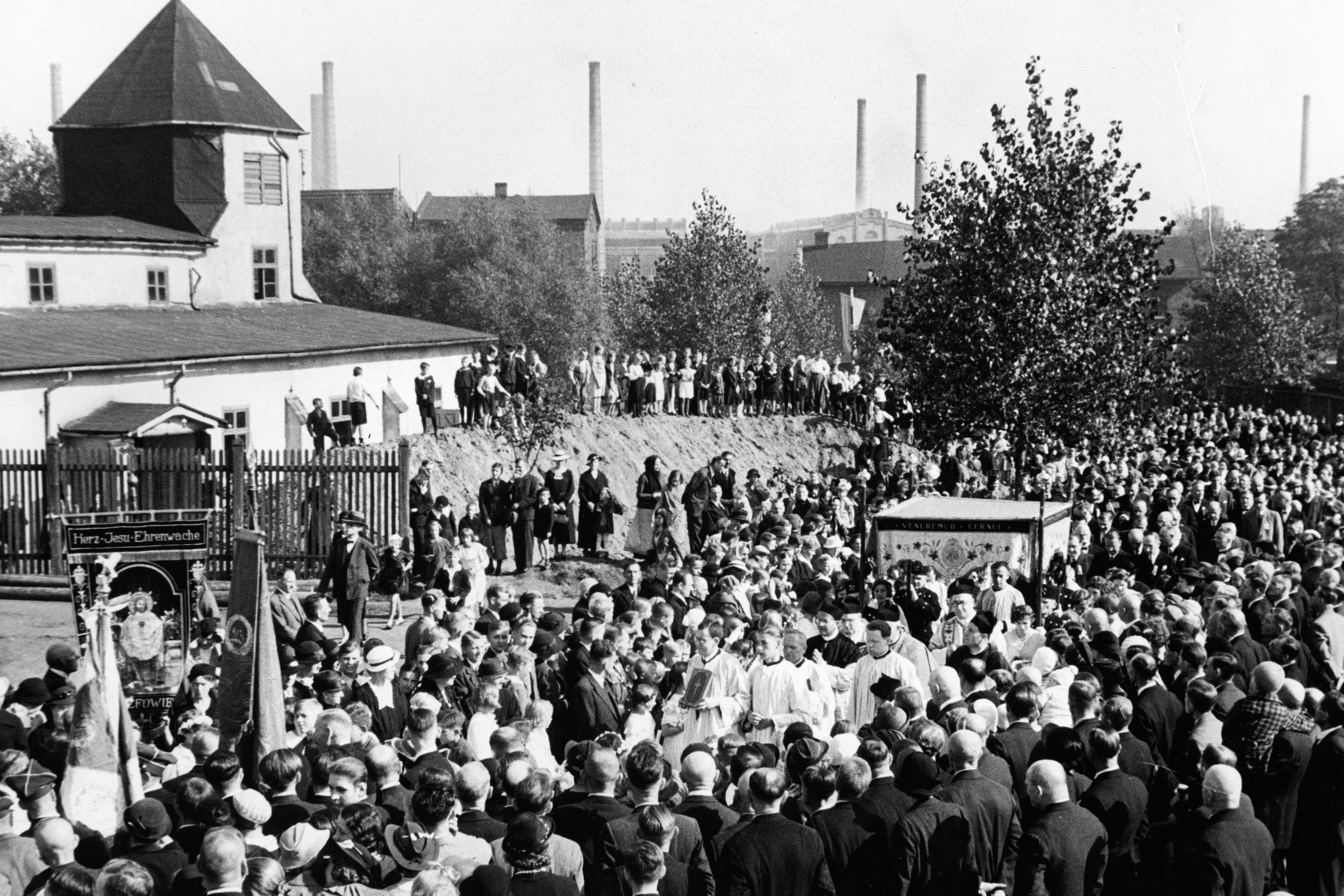
Ceremony of laying the foundation stone of the Church of St. Joseph the Worker in 1935; the temporary church is partially visible on the left

In 1920, the first Roman Catholic church in Wełnowiec was founded on the former premises of a steel mill warehouse, and a parish was established a year later. The current church building was completed in 1930. In Józefowiec, however, the first efforts to form a new Roman Catholic parish community were made in 1895, but the parish, a branch of the one in Dąb, was established only in 1919. In 1935, the Church of St. Joseph the Worker was built. In 1924, Gmina Wełnowiec was established, to which, in addition to Wełnowiec, Józefowiec and the Agnieszka Colony were also annexed, as well as the factory settlements of Alfred and Fryderyka.

The period from 1930 to 1938 was marked by the growth of bootleg mining in Gmina Wełnowiec. In the early 1930s, a colony of two-family houses with gardens was built for government officials (the so-called voivodeship houses). On the anniversary of the outbreak of the Second Silesian Uprising, on 14 August 1938, a monument to the Silesian Insurgents was unveiled. It was dismantled by the Germans in 1939, and a new one was erected in 1959 on the site of the pre-war monument.

During World War II, Gmina Wełnowiec was occupied by the Third Reich. German administration took over, Polish cultural, educational, and sports institutions were dissolved, and the gmina's German name, Hohenlohehütte, was restored. Production at the Wełnowiec plants was then redirected to the arms industry. Underground resistance activities were also carried out. In 1945, Wełnowiec-Józefowiec was captured by the 1st Ukrainian Front of the Red Army. After seizing the settlement, Soviet troops quickly dismantled and removed equipment from the production facilities.

=== Post-war period ===
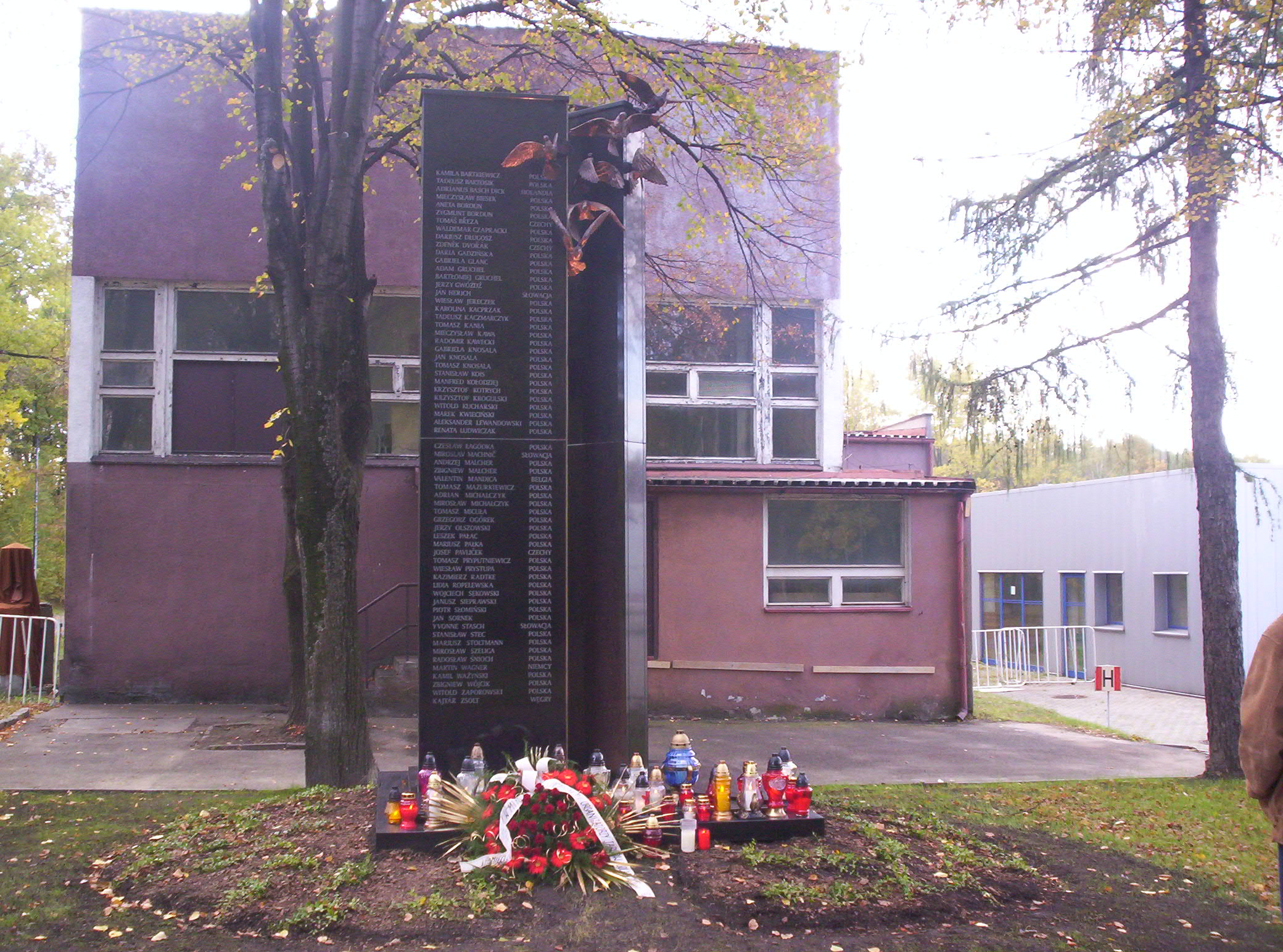
Monument commemorating those who died in the Katowice Trade Hall roof collapse

In 1951, Gmina Wełnowiec was incorporated into Katowice. The main development of Józefowiec took in the subsequent period. New housing estates of multi-story apartment buildings were built there at that time. A significant redevelopment of the district began in 1968, with the start of the first phase of Osiedle Szczecińska-Nowotki. By the 1980s, multi-family buildings had also been constructed, along with commercial and service facilities, including on Józefowska, J. Mikusiński, and Słoneczna streets. In Wełnowiec, however, coal mining ceased by 1951, and in 1965 a project was launched to reclaim wasteland.

As a result of the new administrative division of Katowice on 1 January 1992, Józefowiec and Wełnowiec, along with the adjacent housing estates and colonies, were incorporated into the Wełnowiec-Józefowiec administrative unit. After 1989, production at the zinc smelter was systematically phased out, and its facilities were demolished in 2005. Many plants were privatized or liquidated. However, a number of investments and renovations were also carried out, including at Primary School No. 17, and the intersection of Wojciech Korfanty Avenue with Gnieźnieńska and Konduktorska streets was rebuilt. One of the worst structural disasters in Poland occurred at the Katowice International Fair on Bytkowska Street on 28 January 2006. During a homing pigeon fair taking place that day, the roof collapsed, killing 65 people and injuring 170.

== Politics and administration ==
The area of present-day Wełnowiec-Józefowiec belonged to the Bytom land since the Middle Ages. A significant portion of the current district was part of the village of Bytków, with the exception of the southern section of present-day Wełnowiec, which was part of Bogucice. After 1742, when Upper Silesia was incorporated into Prussia, counties were established, and their boundaries coincided with the existing state borders. In 1796, with the village's acquisition by Prince Friedrich Ludwig, Ignacowiec, together with Wełnowiec, became part of the Bytków manorial estate. On 1 January 1874, administrative districts (German: Amtsbezirk) were established, encompassing several gminas and manorial estates. Among the newly created districts was Wełnowiec (German: Amtsbezirk Hohenholehütte). It comprised the rural Gmina Bytków (German: Bittkow), the Bytków manorial estate along with the Ignacowiec colony (German: Ignatzdorf), and the Józefowiec colony (German: Josephsdorf), which had been separated from Gmina Dąb. In 1873, the Katowice County was separated from the Bytom County, comprising the areas of present-day Wełnowiec-Józefowiec. Between 1875 and 1894, Gmina Józefowiec existed temporarily as a separate entity from Dąb, after which it was reincorporated into Gmina Dąb on 1 April 1894.

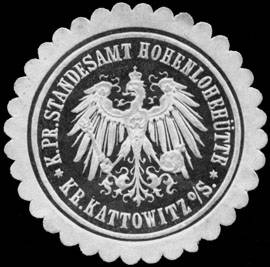
Seal of the Civil Registry Office in Wełnowiec from the second half of the 19th century

In the period before World War I, Gmina Wełnowiec used a seal with an emblem depicting a saint in a habit floating on a cloud, likely St. Ignatius of Loyola. Below, on both sides, were small coniferous trees. The seal from 1922 and later ones were inscribed. The seal of the former Gmina Józefowiec from 1862 had an equal-armed cross with flared ends, and at the bottom, a rake and a scythe crossed by their handles on the grass. The seal from between 1875 and 1890 was already inscribed.

After the Wełnowiec-Józefowiec region was incorporated into Poland in 1922, the area of the current district was located within the Bytków manor and Gmina Dąb, both of which were part of the Katowice County. With the abolition of manorial districts, the Bytków-Wełnowiec area was divided into two parts: from the part south of the road from Chorzów to Siemianowice (present-day Telewizyjna Street), the new rural Gmina Wełnowiec was established, operating from 1 July 1924, and the Agnieszka Colony was separated from the Chorzów manor area (present-day Chorzów Stary), and incorporated into Gmina Dąb. By virtue of an act of the Silesian Parliament of 15 July 1924, Gmina Dąb (without the Józefowiec area) was incorporated into Katowice. Józefowiec itself, together with the Agnieszka Colony, was merged into Gmina Wełnowiec. The act came into force on 15 October 1924. On 1 April 1933, Gmina Wełnowiec was granted so-called municipal status. The first provisional head of Gmina Wełnowiec was Jan Broll, who held office until the outbreak of World War II. The seat of the gmina's administration and office was located on the present-day Wojciech Korfanty Avenue, near the Wełnowiec church. The building was demolished in the late 1970s and early 1980s.

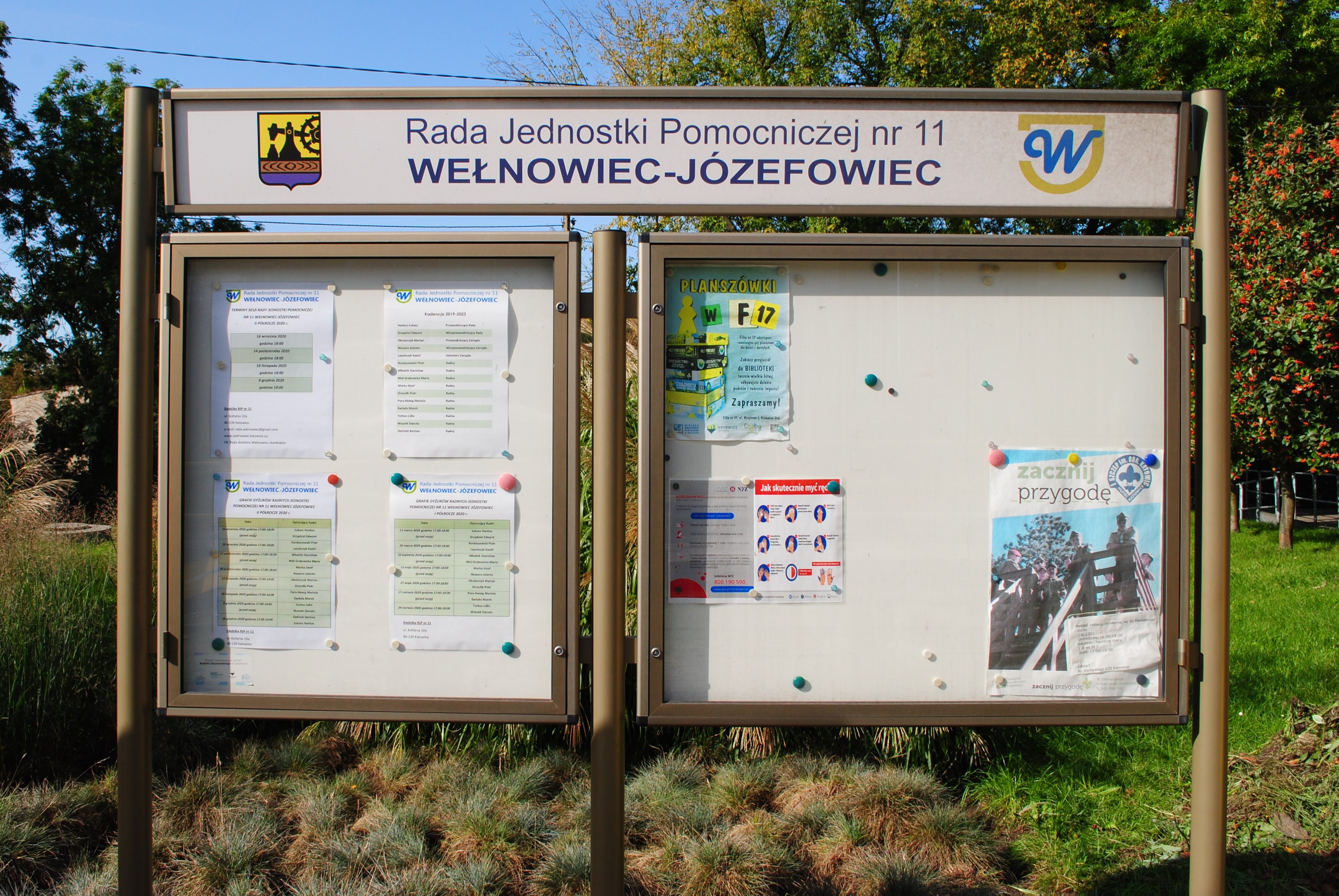
Notice board of the then District Council of Auxiliary Unit No. 11 Wełnowiec-Józefowiec at Wojciech Korfanty Avenue

After World War II, the Katowice County was abolished, and Gmina Wełnowiec was incorporated into the city of Katowice on 1 April 1951. In October 1954, the present-day city was divided into districts, with the current area of Wełnowiec-Józefowiec largely becoming part of the Bogucice-Zawodzie district, while a small section in the vicinity of Słoneczna and Krzyżowa streets was part of Śródmieście-Załęże district. On 1 January 1992, 22 Auxiliary Local Government Units were established in Katowice. According to Resolution No. XLVI/449/97 of the Katowice City Council of 29 September 1997, Wełnowiec-Józefowiec is a statutory district within the northern district group and constitutes the 11th auxiliary unit.

The Wełnowiec-Józefowiec District Council No. 11 operates in the Wełnowiec-Józefowiec area. Its charter was adopted on 30 August 2010 by the Katowice City Council. The council consists of 15 members elected for a four-year term, with headquarters at 10a T. Kotlarz Street. During the 2015–2019 term, 46 council sessions were held, during which 56 resolutions were adopted. In addition, the council at that time and the Board of Auxiliary Unit No. 11 organized a number of local initiatives and participated in meetings concerning matters related to Wełnowiec-Józefowiec, including those related to the district's infrastructure (e.g., repairs to roadways or sidewalks, installation of street furniture, organization of neighborhood cleanup campaigns, or participation in the design of facilities within the district) and educational, cultural, and recreational matters (including co-organizing the annual neighborhood festival, Wełnowiec-Józefowiec Days, or organizing historical celebrations at Walenty Fojkis Square). Council members also showed initiative in submitting projects to the Participatory Budget. During the 2019–2023 term, Łukasz Hankus served as Council Chair, while Marian Okularczyk served as Executive Board Chair. During the 2011–2015 term, Marek Nowara was the Council Chair, later serving as a Katowice City Council member from 2014 to 2018, elected from the Silesian Autonomy Movement's list.

In elections to the city council, Wełnowiec-Józefowiec belongs to constituency No. 1 (Zawodzie, Wełnowiec-Józefowiec, Koszutka, Bogucice). From 2018 to 2023, it had 5 representatives on the City Council.

== Economy and institutions ==
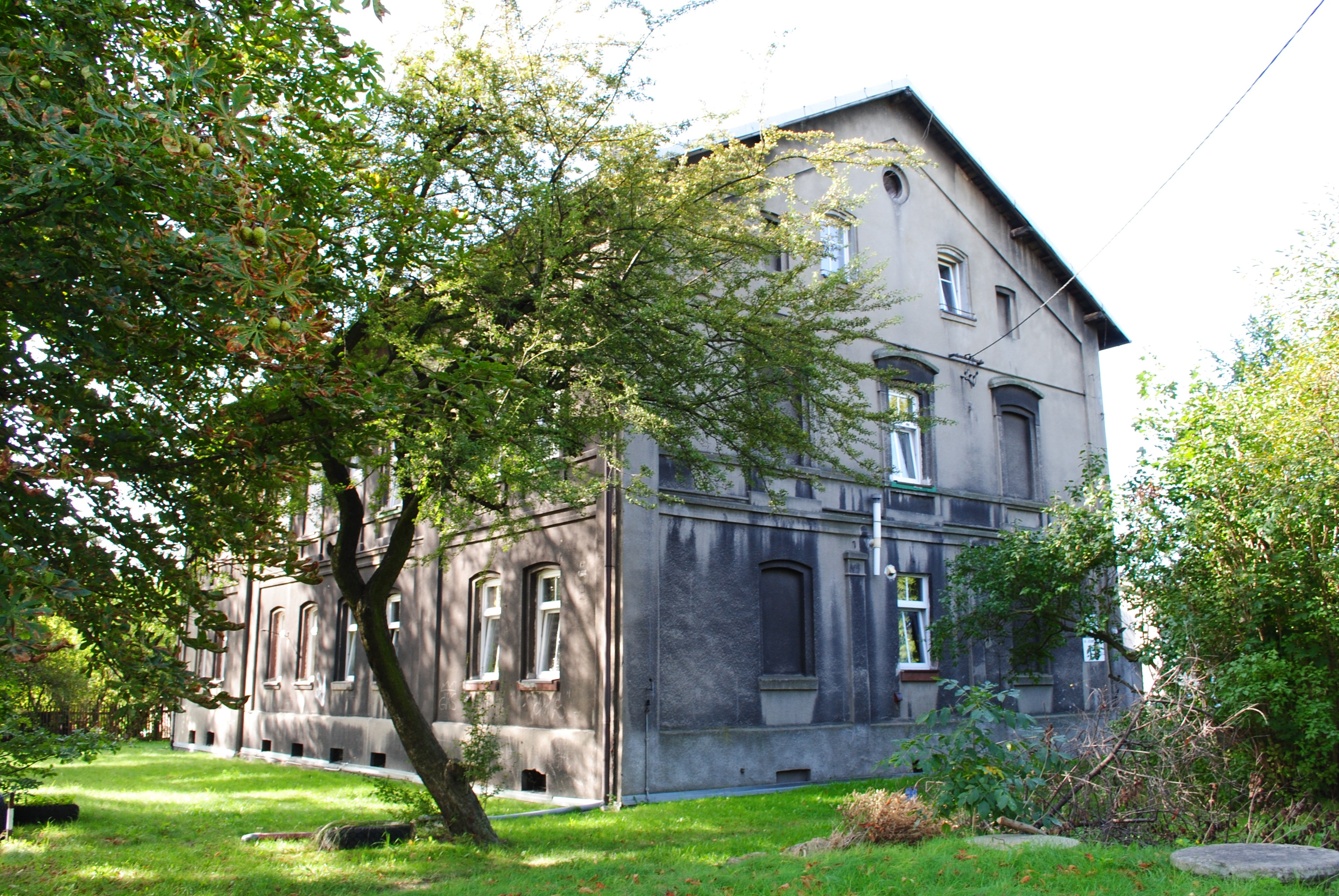
Former office of the Waterloo Coal Mine at the present-day 10 Józefowska Street

Industrial activity in the Józefowiec and Wełnowiec area began to develop rapidly thanks to the shallow coal deposits found there. The first small mine, Caroline, was established in 1788 near the so-called Wełnowiec Alps. The request for a mining concession for this mine was submitted on 2 November 1787. Extraction was initially conducted by open-pit methods and later using small shafts. In June 1805, a mining concession was granted for a new mine, Hohenlohe, owned by Prince Friedrich Ludwig and industrialist John Baildon. Due to flooding and the resulting lengthy drainage work, the mine did not become operational until 1818. Under the terms of an agreement from 1806, investors also established the Hohenlohe Ironworks within the settlement, the construction of which was completed in 1819. Two coke-fired blast furnaces were built there. Subsequent mines were established after 1829, including Maria (in 1829), Alfred, August (in 1834), and Hütte (in 1842). From 1848, a process began to merge smaller mining operations into a single mine – Hohenlohe – which was established on 13 April 1869, combining Hohenlohe, Maria, Caroline, and Hütte mines. By the end of the 19th century, production at the consolidated Hohenlohe mine amounted to approximately 623,000 tons of coal per year. The Alfred shaft was closed in 1913 due to its poor technical condition. In 1926, the mine was renamed "Wełnowiec", and it was shut down on 31 March 1933.

The Waterloo Coal Mine, co-owned by John Baildon from December 1838, also operated in the present-day Wełnowiec-Józefowiec. The mine's area stretched from the current intersection of Józefowska and Bytkowska streets to the Słoneczna junction, and further west to the intersection of Szczecińska and Krzyżowa streets. Coal extraction began in March 1839. In 1888, the mine reached its peak production, and in 1897, the Higher Mining Authority ordered its closure.

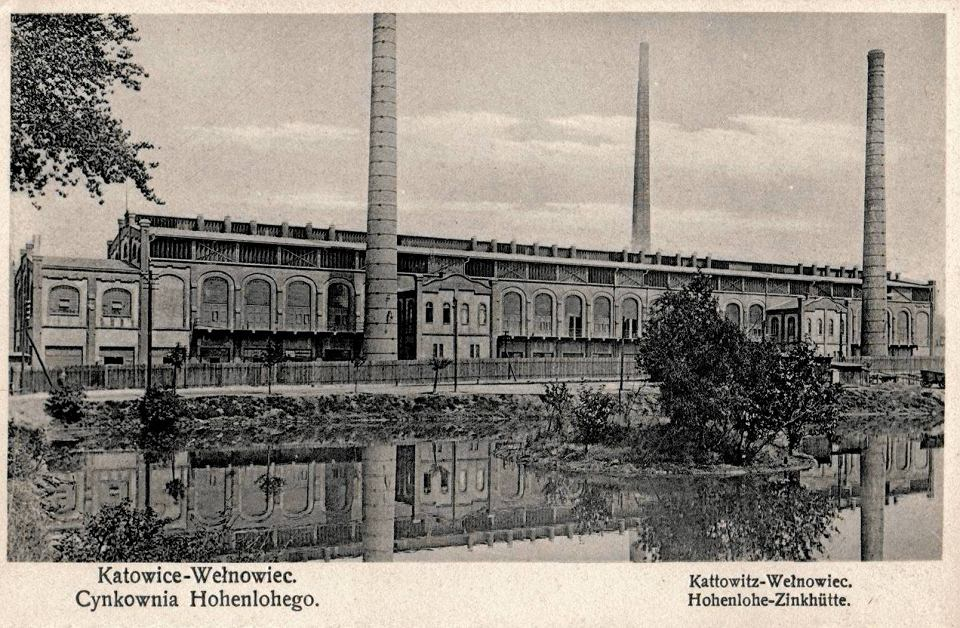
Buildings of the Hohenlohe Zinc Smelter in a photograph from around 1930

Zinc metallurgy also developed in Wełnowiec. The first zinc smelter, Helena, was established in 1821. Construction of the Hohenlohe Zinc Smelter began in 1871 and it opened on 1 March 1873 (later the Silesia Zinc Works). At that time, it was one of the largest smelters in Upper Silesia – at the beginning of the 20th century, the Hohenlohe concern produced 55.7% of zinc ore, 21.3% of zinc sheet, and 6.8% of coal. After the annexation of part of Upper Silesia to Poland, the plants on the Polish side were consolidated into the Hohenlohe-Werke joint-stock company. In 1936, the establishment was renamed the Wełnowiec Zinc Smelter. After 1945, the industry was nationalized. The Katowice Coal Industry Association was established at the former headquarters of Hohenlohe-Werke. On 31 December 1949, the Wełnowiec Zinc Works were opened. On 1 July 1961, the Silesia Zinc Works in Wełnowiec and the Silesia Zinc Works in Lipiny were merged into a single enterprise under the name Silesia Zinc Works. In 1984, the company was renamed the Silesia Metallurgical Works. Currently, it is a joint-stock company headquartered at 8 Konduktorska Street and is involved in zinc processing.

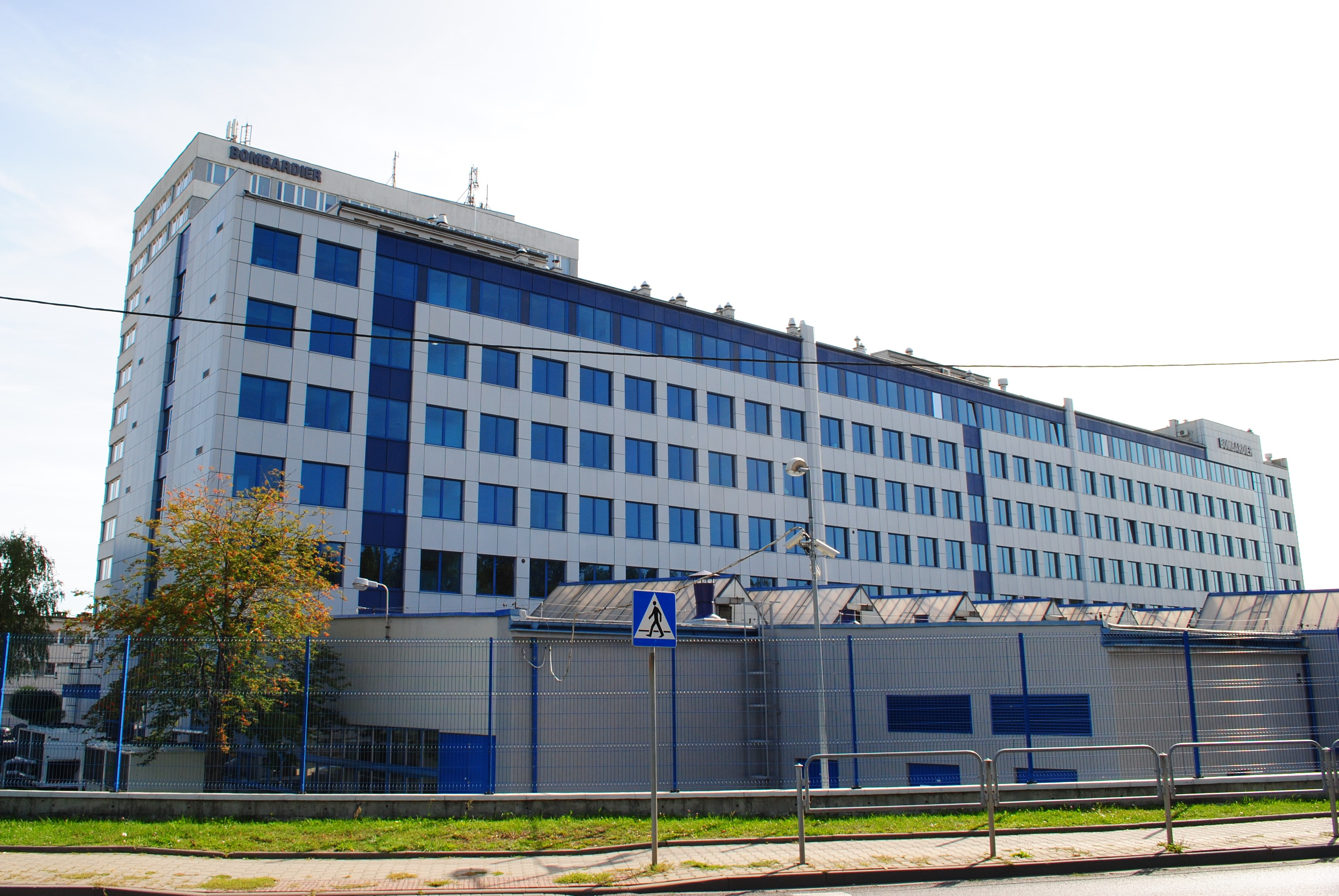
Premises of Alstom ZWUS at Modelarska Street

New businesses in other industries were established in Józefowiec and Wełnowiec in the 1920s, including: the Sigma chemical factory, the Upper Silesian Chocolate, Gingerbread, and Confectionery Factory of E. Vesper, the E. Postułka Steel Furniture Factory, the Telephone Factory, an iron foundry, and food processing plants. The following companies were also established in Gmina Wełnowiec: Ericsson (after World War II, the Signal Equipment Manufacturing Works), the Rapid Mining Equipment and Tools Factory, and OPTA Silesian Mechanical and Optical Works. In the postwar years, the printing and electronics industries developed in Wełnowiec-Józefowiec.

In the wake of the economic and political changes after 1989, the businesses in the district were either privatized or shut down. During this time, production at the zinc smelter was halted, and the last smelter buildings were demolished in 2005. In the same year, efforts to establish an industrial park also began. The Upper Silesian Industrial Park company began transforming the post-industrial sites of the former zinc smelter on the border of Katowice and Siemianowice Śląskie into a modern economic complex. In 1992, the Katowice International Fair was established in the buildings of the former Technical Progress Center on Bytkowska Street, organizing numerous trade and exhibition events.

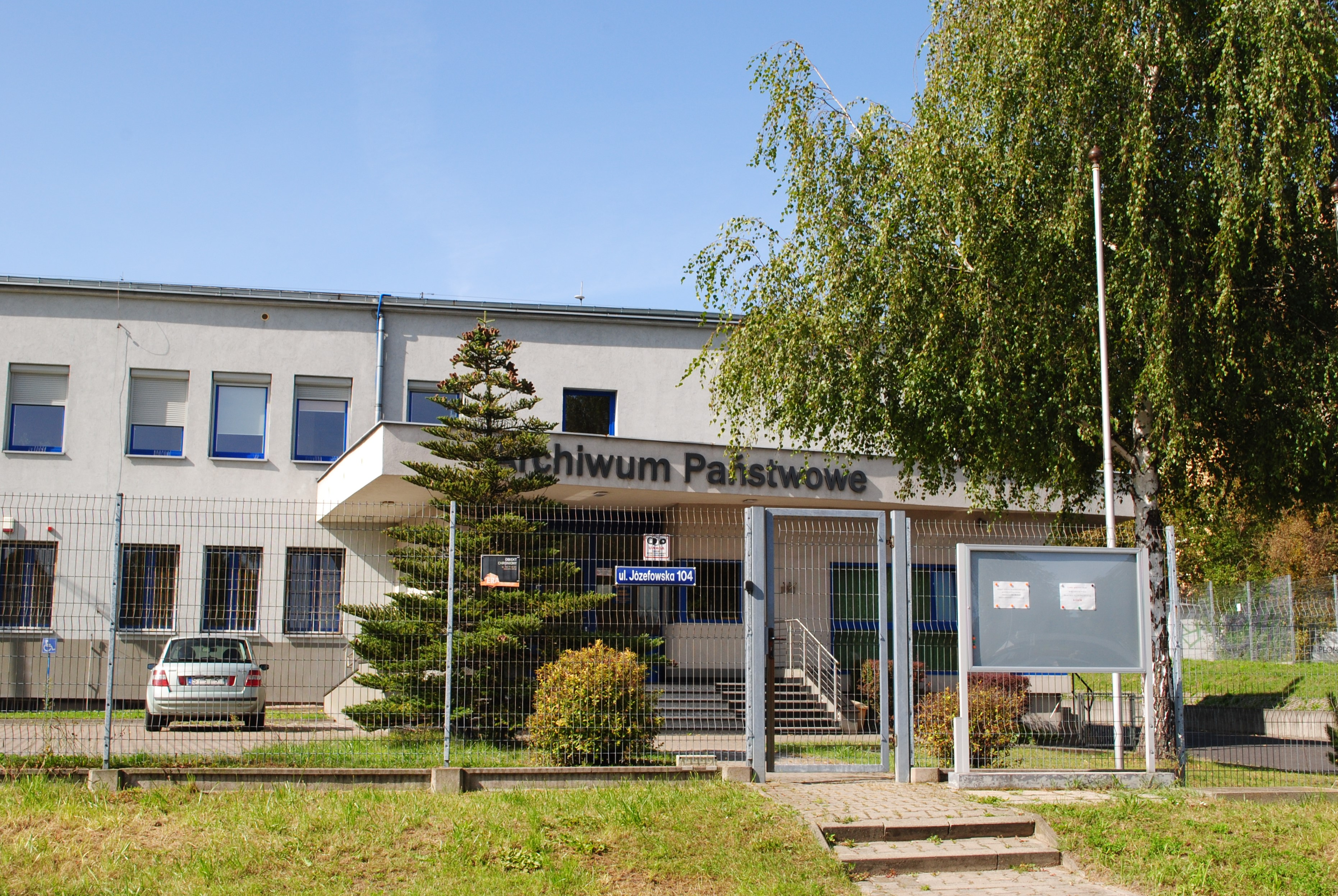
Seat of the State Archives in Katowice (Józefowska Street 104)

Among the larger companies operating in Wełnowiec-Józefowiec is ZPUE, a company in the electrical power industry, which has one of its facilities in a building formerly occupied by Elektromontaż, purchased in 2007. The mechanical components manufacturer Transcom also has facilities in the district. Fasing is headquartered at 11 Modelarska Street.

Several institutions with city-wide or regional jurisdiction are headquartered in Wełnowiec-Józefowiec. The former seat of the Hohenlohe-Werke at Wojciech Korfanty Avenue now houses the Court of Appeals. Owocowa Street is home to, among others, a branch of the Statistics Office and the Regional Labour Inspectorate of the State Labour Inspection. The following institutions also have their headquarters in Wełnowiec-Józefowiec: the State Archives, a branch of the Institute of National Remembrance, and the Regional Social Policy Center of Silesian Voivodeship.

As of 31 December 2013, there were 2,055 business entities registered in the REGON system in Wełnowiec-Józefowiec, accounting for 4.5% of all entities in Katowice, of which 1,930 were microenterprises (129 enterprises per 1,000 district residents; the city average at that time was 145 microenterprises per 1,000 people). In 2013, there were 553 unemployed people in Wełnowiec-Józefowiec.

Two areas have emerged in Wełnowiec-Józefowiec that serve as local service hubs:

- the intersection of Szczecińska, Krzyżowa, T. Kotlarz, and P. Ściegienny streets – an area with commercial and educational facilities, a community center, a library, recreational areas, and public transportation stops;
- Józefowska Street from M. Karłowicz Street to Rysia Street, as well as the area between Szczecińska and J. Mikusiński streets – this area has commercial and educational facilities, a library, a church, recreational areas, and public transportation stops.

== Technical infrastructure ==
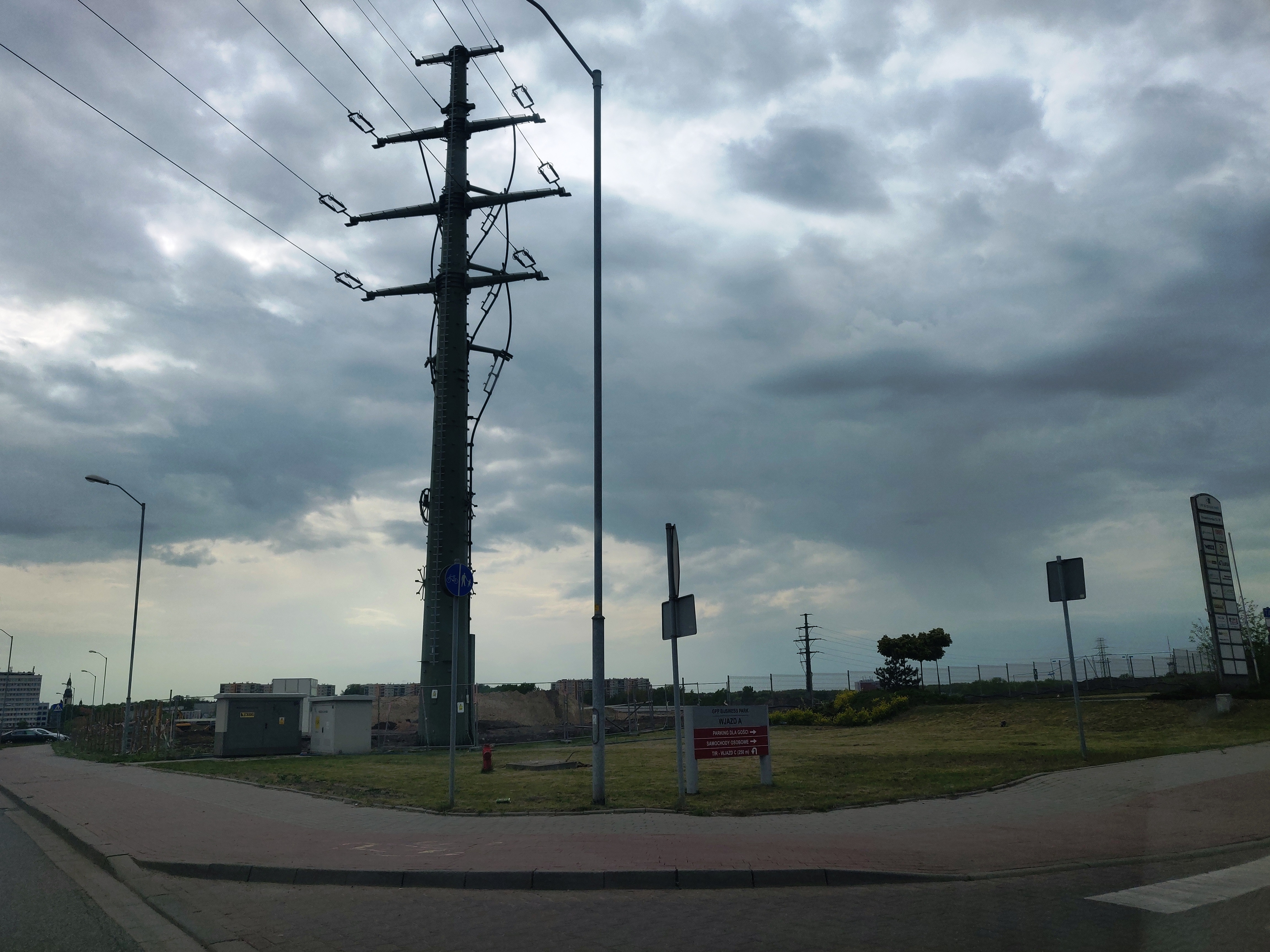
Section of the 110 kV high-voltage electricity network in the area of Konduktorska Street in Wełnowiec-Józefowiec

There are no drinking water intakes within the district – Wełnowiec-Józefowiec, like the rest of Katowice, relies on surface water intakes from the following reservoirs: Goczałkowice Lake on the Vistula, Czanieckie Lake on the Soła, and water intakes in Dziećkowice Lake, Maczki, and Kozłowa Góra. Water from the Water Treatment Plant is distributed via main and distribution water mains. Main water mains managed by Katowice Waterworks run through the district, as well as a water main network managed by the Upper Silesian Waterworks Company along Bytkowska Street, Telewizyjna Street, and Wojciech Korfanty Avenue.

The water supply network in present-day Wełnowiec-Józefowiec was extended to Wełnowiec in 1894 due to a cholera epidemic in the region. The water main was laid from the Kleofas Coal Mine. Due to a significant increase in water consumption in Katowice, a main pipeline made of cast iron pipes was laid from Dąbrówka Wielka. Between 1895 and 1897, a 450-mm-diameter section was laid along existing roads between Bytków and Alfred Colony, a 350/300-mm section from Alfred Colony through Wełnowiec and Koszutka to Katowice, and several branches, including a 100-mm-diameter one from Wełnowiec to Józefowiec. Parallel to the main pipelines, new lines were built between 1905 and 1907. Water from the Rosaliengrube calamine mine in Dąbrówka Wielka began to be distributed on.

The Wełnowiec-Józefowiec sewer system is managed by Katowice Waterworks and operated by the Sewer System Operations Branch – Center. The district's sewer system is located in the catchment area of the Gigablok wastewater treatment plant, owned by the Katowice Water and Sewage Infrastructure company. As part of the reconstruction of the sanitary sewer system, the Wełnowiecki-II collector with a diameter of 1,600 mm was constructed, among other projects.

Electricity is supplied to the residents of Wełnowiec-Józefowiec via a 110-kV high-voltage grid connecting the town to nearby power plants. The only substation within the boundaries of the district is located in the area of Cisowa and Owocowa streets. It is the Wełnowiec substation with a voltage level of 110/20/6 kV, equipped with two transformers: 25 and 16 MVA. The power grid runs through the eastern part of Wełnowiec-Józefowiec, along the border with Siemianowice Śląskie. It is managed by the Tauron Group. The average electricity consumption per household in Katowice was 865.7 kWh in 2006.

== Demographics ==
Population structure in Wełnowiec-Józefowiec by gender and age (as of 31 December 2015)
Period/Number of inhabitants	pre-working age (0–18 years)	working age (18–60/65 years)	post-working age (over 60/65 years)	Total
Total	2,162	8,497	3,872	14,531
women	1,055	4,058	2,595	7,708
men	1,107	4,439	1,277	6,823
Femininity ratio	95	91	203	113

The earliest demographic data on the population of Wełnowiec-Józefowiec date back to the 18th century. At that time, in 1780, the settlement of Ignacowiec (Wełnowiec) had 43 inhabitants. In 1850, 406 people lived there. Around 1840, 377 people lived in 20 familoks in Wełnowiec. In 1826, Józefowiec was founded, where Father Józef Beder settled 30 cottagers. In 1845, there were 35 houses in Józefowiec, home to 312 people. In 1862, Józefowiec had a population of 510; in 1871, 752, and in 1873, 1,000 people. On 31 July 1930, 11,184 people lived in Gmina Wełnowiec, of whom 5,606 were men and 5,578 were women. According to data of 30 June 1935, 11,788 people lived in the gmina, including 5,928 men and 5,860 women. Immediately after 1945, the population of Gmina Wełnowiec decreased due to resettlement campaigns and migration.

Since 1988, Wełnowiec-Józefowiec has recorded a systematic decline in its population. At that time, 18,923 people lived in the district; in terms of age structure, people aged 30–44 were the largest group, while those aged 60 and older were the smallest. As of December 2007, Wełnowiec-Józefowiec had 15,924 residents (5.0% of the city's total population). At that time, it was the 8th most populous district of Katowice (out of the city's 22 districts). The average population density was 5,060 people per km² and was higher than the average for Katowice as a whole, which was 1,916 people per km² at the time. People aged 45–59 and 60 and older were the most numerous, while those aged 0–14 made up the smallest share. According to a survey conducted in 2012, 43.3% of the residents of Wełnowiec-Józefowiec surveyed declared Polish nationality, 25.4% declared Silesian nationality, and 31.3% declared both Silesian and Polish nationality. The age and gender structure of the residents of the district in 2015 is presented in the table below.

Sources: 1780 (Ignacowiec); 1885 (including 1,779 people in Józefowiec and 760 people in Wełnowiec); 1930 (data as of 31 July 1930); 1935 (30 June 1935); 1939 (data as of 17 May 1939; according to another source, the same number of people lived there on 10 February 1945); 1946 (data for May); 1988; 1997; 2005; 2010; 2015; 2020.

== Architecture and urban planning ==
Wełnowiec-Józefowiec is a district mainly designated for residential use, with a significant proportion of industrial and commercial areas as well as municipal infrastructure. It is home to several historic workers' colonies, including Agnieszka and Alfred, some of whose buildings are in poor condition. Historic architecture also stretches along Józefowska and Bytomska streets. Multi-family housing is concentrated near Szczecińska and J. Mikusiński streets, while new single-family housing is found, among others, in the area of Promienna, I. Daszyński, and Alfred streets. Areas in the vicinity of the former Energetyków Street and Modelarska, M. Karłowicz, and Konduktorska streets, as well as along Wojciech Korfanty Avenue, on the site of the former zinc smelter, serve industrial and commercial functions. At the same time, Wełnowiec-Józefowiec has significant resources for further development, including in the area of the former Silesia Metallurgical Works, which, based on the provisions of the local zoning plan, remains undeveloped. The proportion of built-up area in Wełnowiec-Józefowiec to total land area was 29% in 2007, the net floor area ratio was 0.54, and the weighted average number of stories was 1.86.

=== Urban development ===
Initially, settlement in Wełnowiec-Józefowiec was concentrated in Wełnowiec, where buildings were constructed at irregular intervals, and it was only with the launch of industrial plants in the 19th century that residential houses for workers began to be built, initially along the road from the currently existing steelworks pond toward Huta Laura, on both sides of the present-day Wojciech Korfanty Avenue. A workers' colony for the miners of the Alfred Coal Mine, granted in 1834, was established, while in the 1850s, the Fryderyka colony was founded at the site of today's M. Karłowicz Street. Around the same time, the Öhringen colony was established in the area of present-day Gnieźnieńska Street.

Józefowiec, founded in 1826, initially consisted of an inn and 30 cottages. According to a map from 1827, the peasant settlements were concentrated on the eastern side of present-day Józefowska Street. By 1845, there were already 35 houses in the village. During this period, in the second half of the 19th century and at the beginning of the 20th century, a number of residential buildings were constructed for the families of workers at the Hohenlohe steelworks and mines; some of them have survived to this day. After Józefowiec was incorporated into Gmina Dąb in 1894, side roads were laid out from the main street – the present-day Rysia, Gnieźnieńska, and M. Karłowicz streets, and, at the turn of the 19th and 20th centuries, Modelarska Street. In the 1890s, Carl Geisler's restaurant was established, which is now a sports hall at 40 Józefowska Street.

In connection with the transfer of the management of Prince Hohenlohe's factories and the establishment of the Hohenlohe-Werke joint-stock company, a neoclassical building was constructed around 1905 to house the company's management, while a villa complex was built for engineers and clerks in the area of Wojciech Korfanty Avenue, Jesionowa Street, and Cisowa Street. In 1927, residential houses were erected at the present-day 134 and 136 Wojciech Korfanty Avenue, designed by Tadeusz Michejda. In the early 1930s, a colony of voivodeship houses was established in the area of today's Józefowska and Bytomska streets, intended for state administration officials.

Pre-war buildings in Wełnowiec-Józefowiec

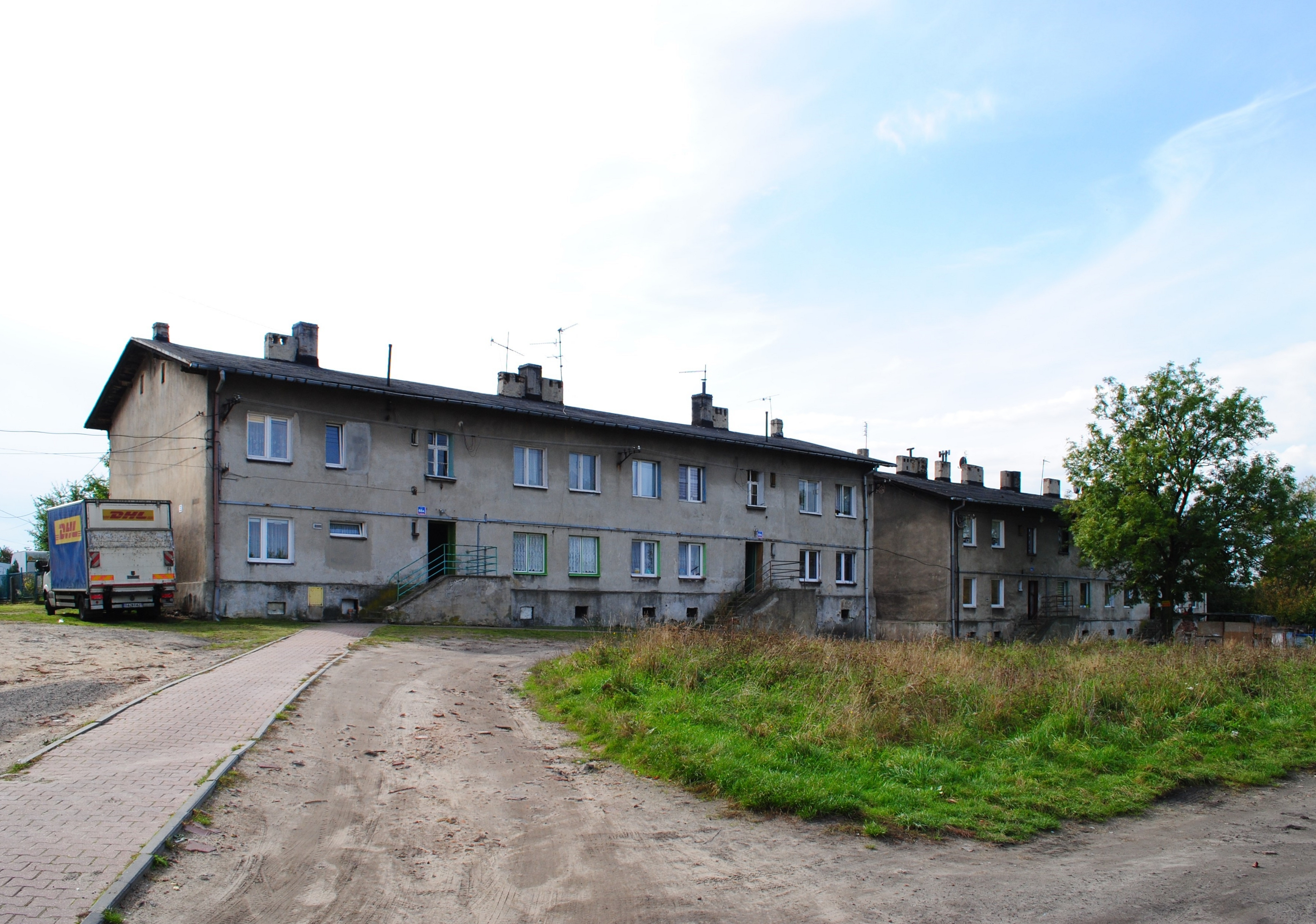
Part of the buildings of Agnieszka Colony at 68a–d Bytkowska Street

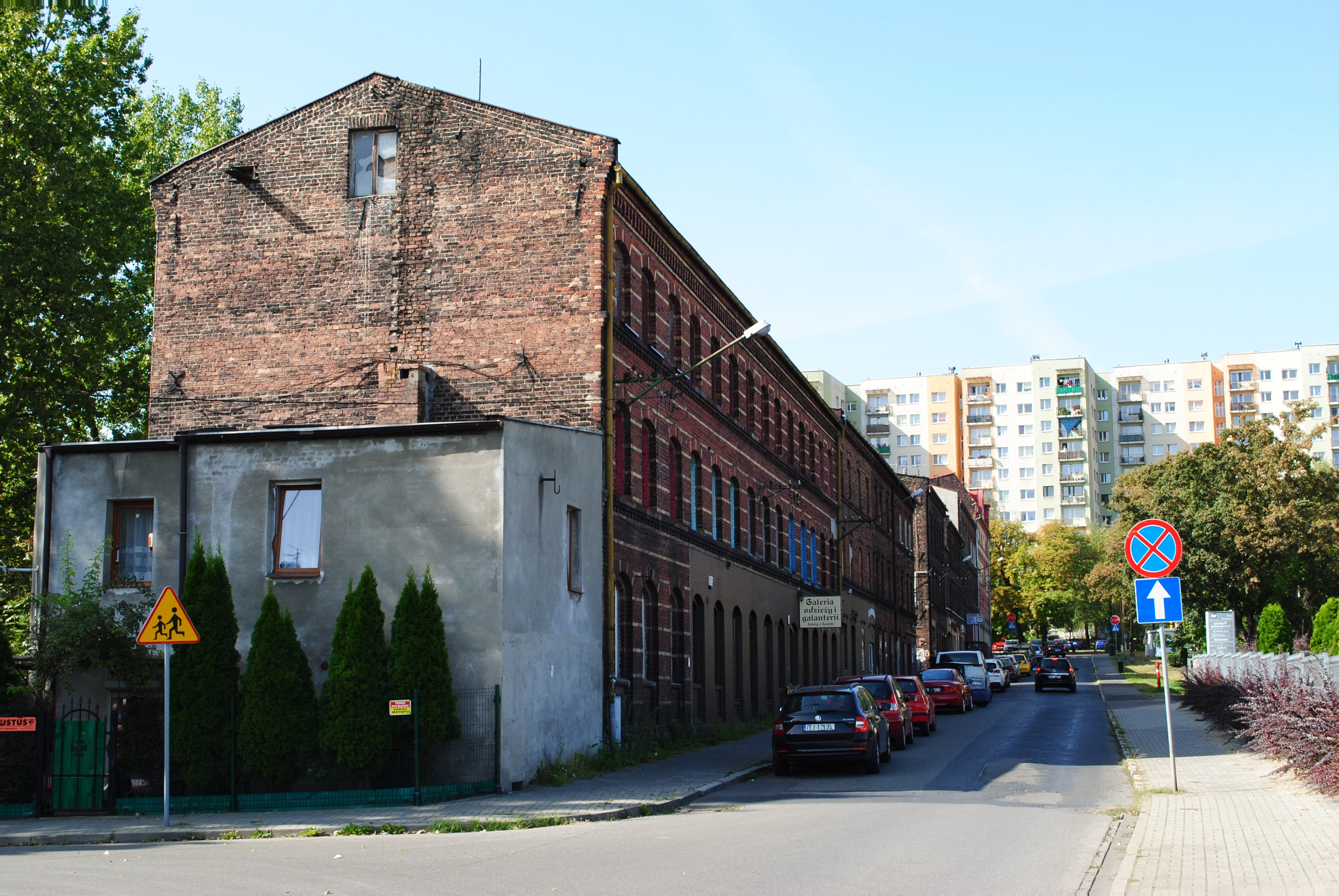
Apartment buildings at M. Karłowicz Street

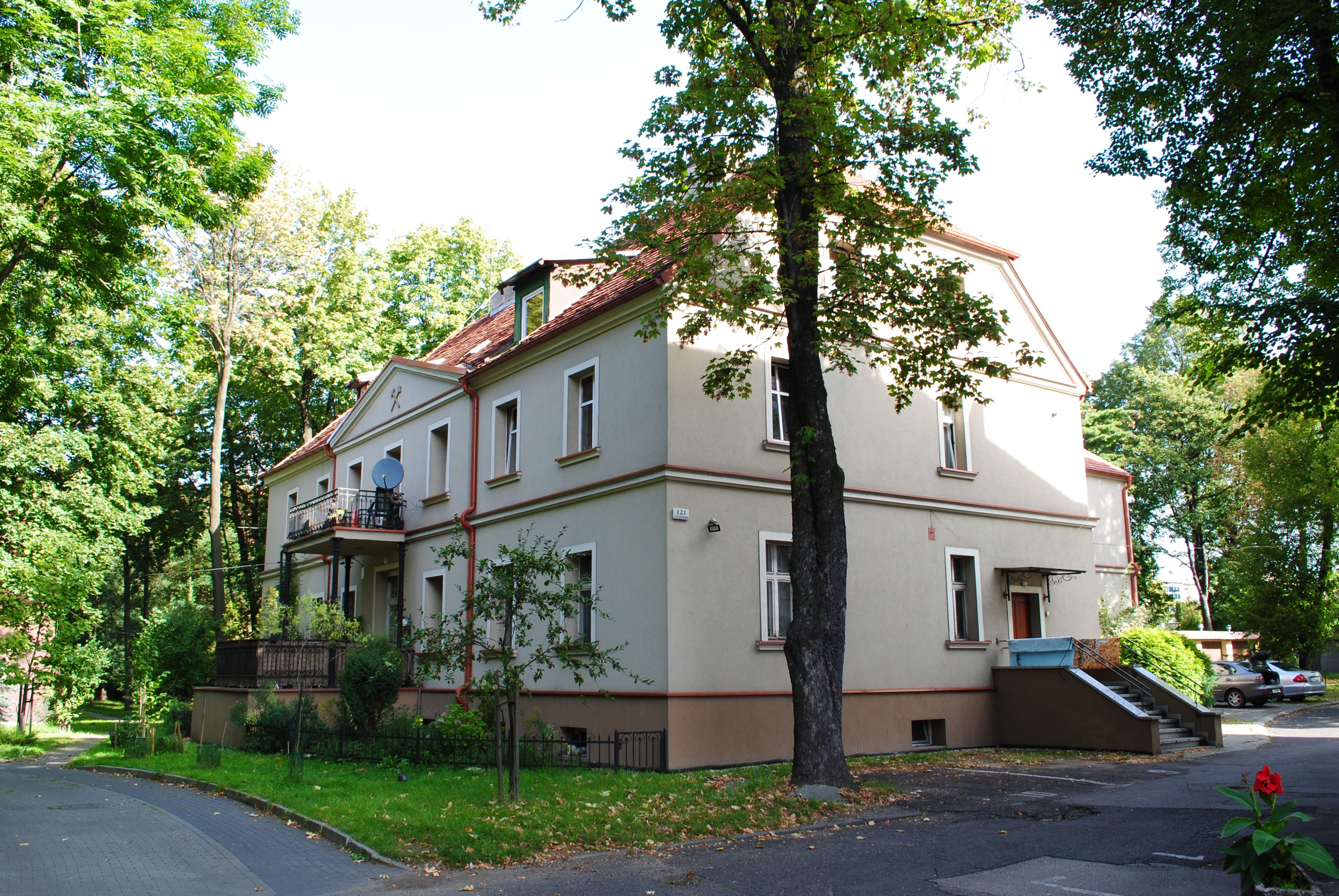
Building at 121 Wojciech Korfanty Avenue

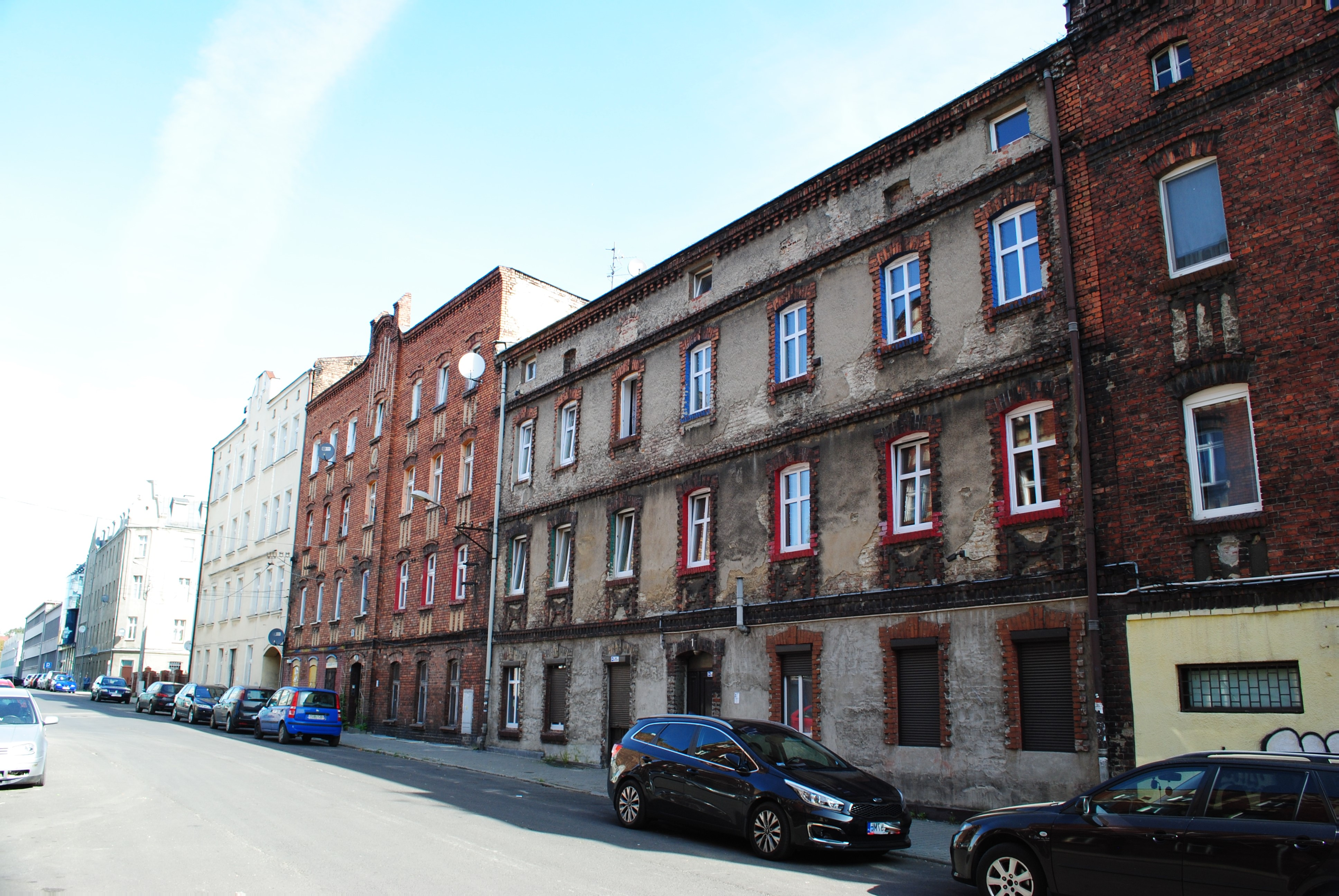
Buildings along Modelarska Street

In the postwar years, due to the proximity of the zinc smelter in the area of Wojciech Korfanty Avenue, no residential buildings were constructed there. New developments, however, emerged in other parts of the district – modern housing was completed near Jesionowa and Owocowa streets in the 1970s and 1980s. In 1953, residential houses were built on the border of Wełnowiec and Józefowiec, at 2, 4, 6, and 8 J. Dekert Street. In the late 1950s, construction began on the first residences in the area of Alfred Street, and in the 1980s, row houses were built along Promienna Street. Much of the industrial development that exists today also dates from the postwar years.

In the 1950s, several buildings were constructed in Józefowiec along Szczecińska and P. Ściegienny streets to house employees of the Silesia smelter in Wełnowiec, and in the 1970s, a housing estate consisting of multi-story apartment buildings was erected near Jabłoniowa Street. Significant development of the area took place in 1968 with the start of the first phase of construction of the Szczecińska-Nowotki housing estate, designed for 4,000 residents. Along with its construction, commercial facilities were also built. The second phase of redevelopment, begun in 1978, was initiated following the demolition of older buildings in the area of J. Mikusiński Street and the Dobra Myśl settlement. 11-story prefabricated concrete panel apartment blocks for 4,000 people were built in their place. A nursery and a kindergarten were also established, along with a retail and service pavilion on Józefowska Street. In 1975, construction began on apartment blocks on Słoneczna Street, intended for 2,500 residents.

After 1989, new development took place mainly in the northern part of Wełnowiec-Józefowiec. In the early 1990s, construction began on a housing estate in the area of I. Daszyński, J. Pietrusiński, and T. Patalong streets. The last houses were completed in 2008. Between 2008 and 2014, the GPP Business Park office complex was built at Konduktorska Street, while in 2009, the DL Atrium retail and service building was erected at 138 Wojciech Korfanty Avenue. In January 2020, construction began on the DL Tower office building. Between 2016 and 2018, the Bytkowska Park residential complex, comprising a total of 242 apartments, was erected in the area of the intersection of Bytkowska and Telewizyjna streets. In Józefowiec, however, relatively few buildings were constructed during this period. Among the larger ones was the building at 42 Józefowska Street from 2004 and, built in 2011, the Lidl supermarket and the headquarters of the Silesian Customs and Tax Office at 34 Słoneczna Street. In June 2018, construction began on a complex of five residential buildings with 211 apartments at the corner of P. Ściegienny and Słoneczna streets. The Nowa Słoneczna housing estate was completed in November 2019.

Post-war buildings in Wełnowiec-Józefowiec

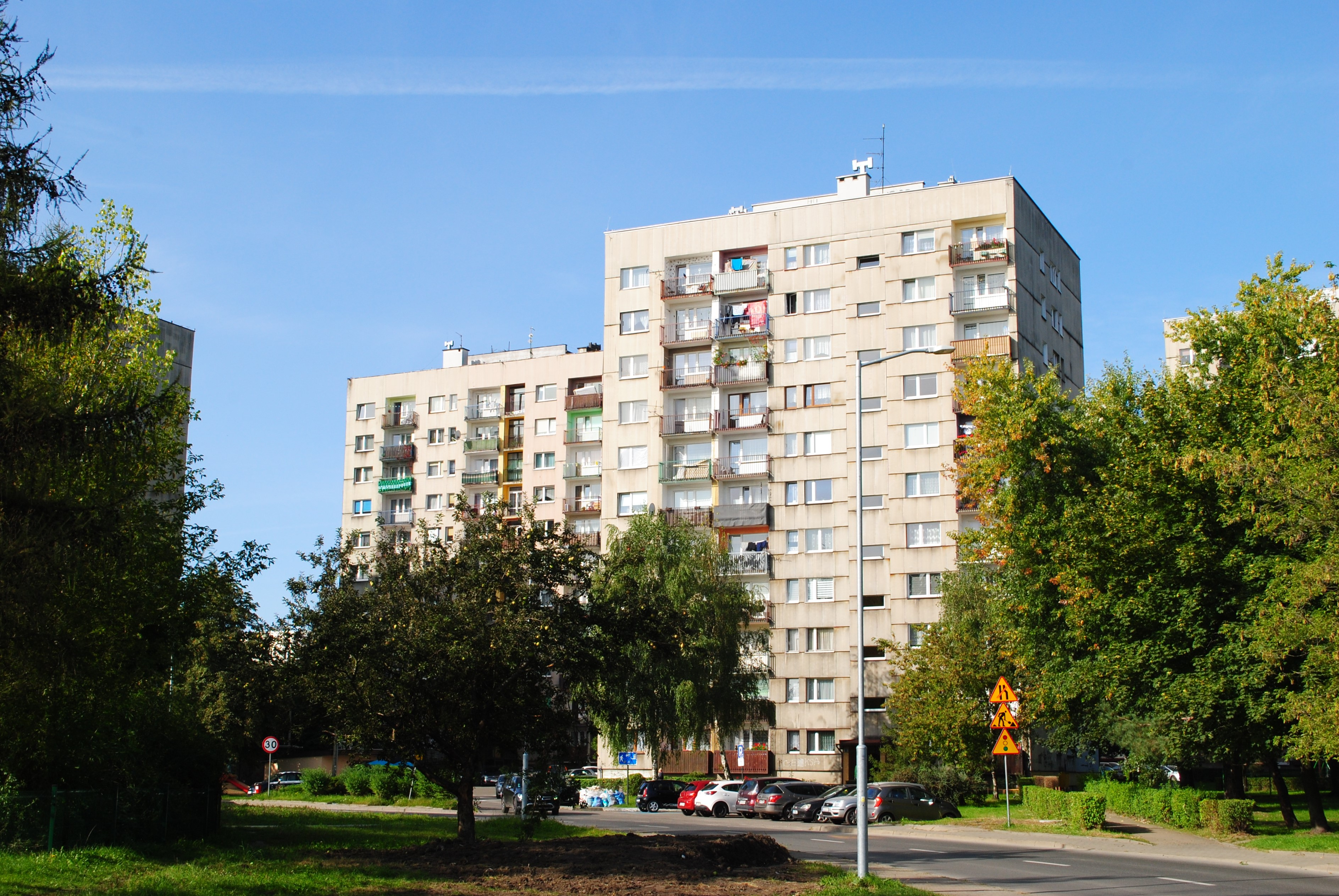
Residential buildings at Słoneczna Street

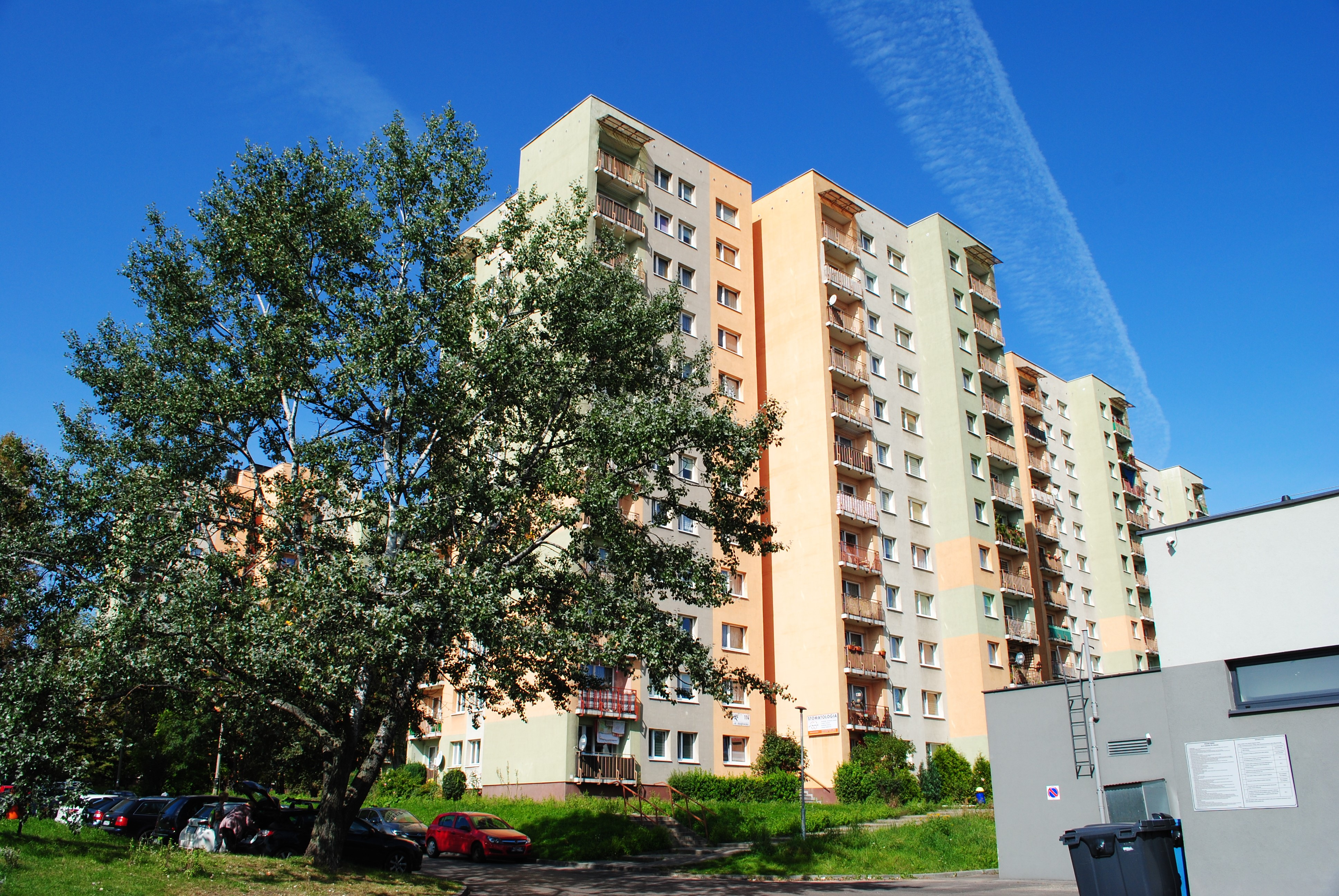
Residential buildings at Józefowska Street

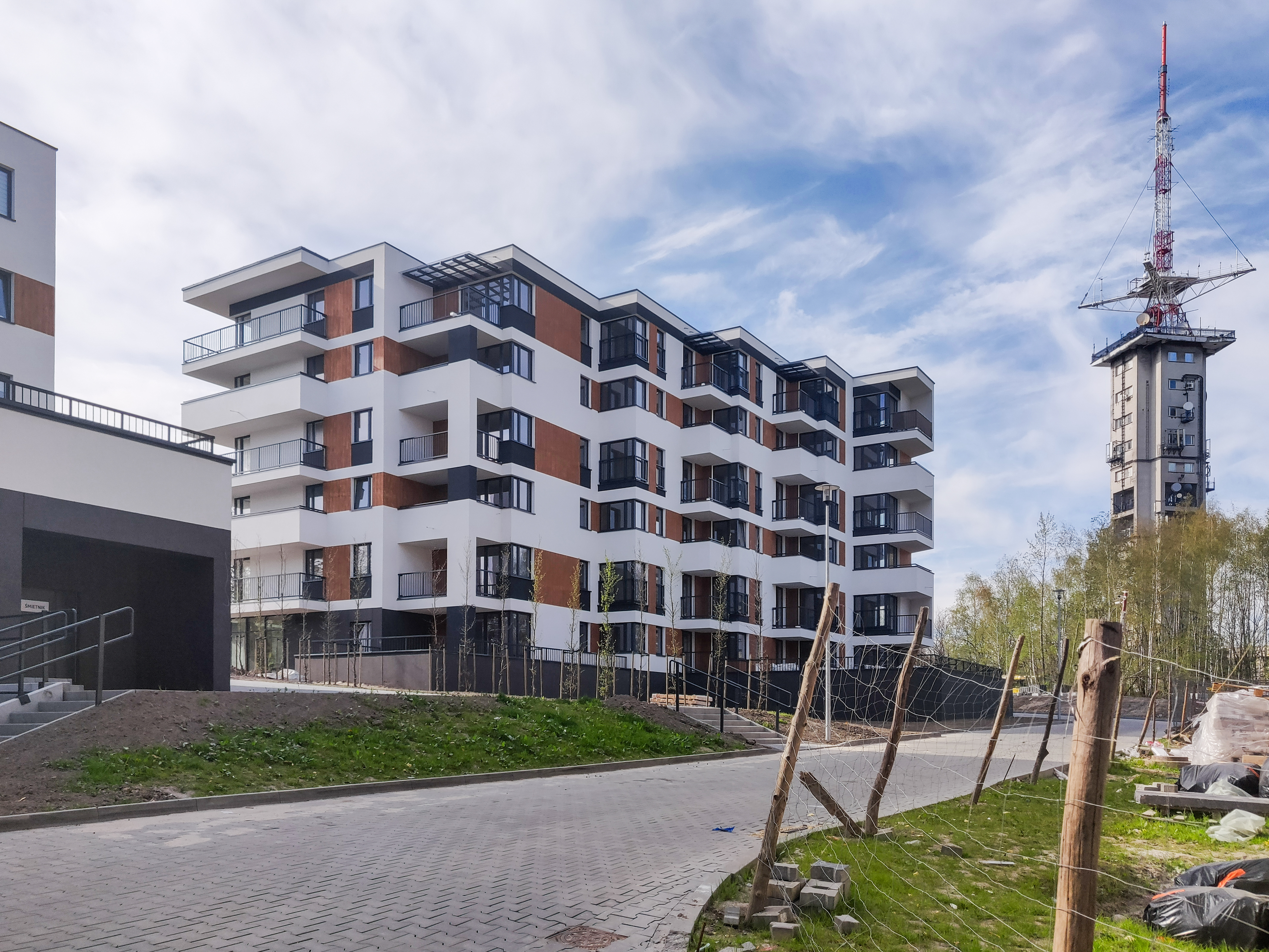
Part of the Bytkowska Park housing estate at Bytkowska Street

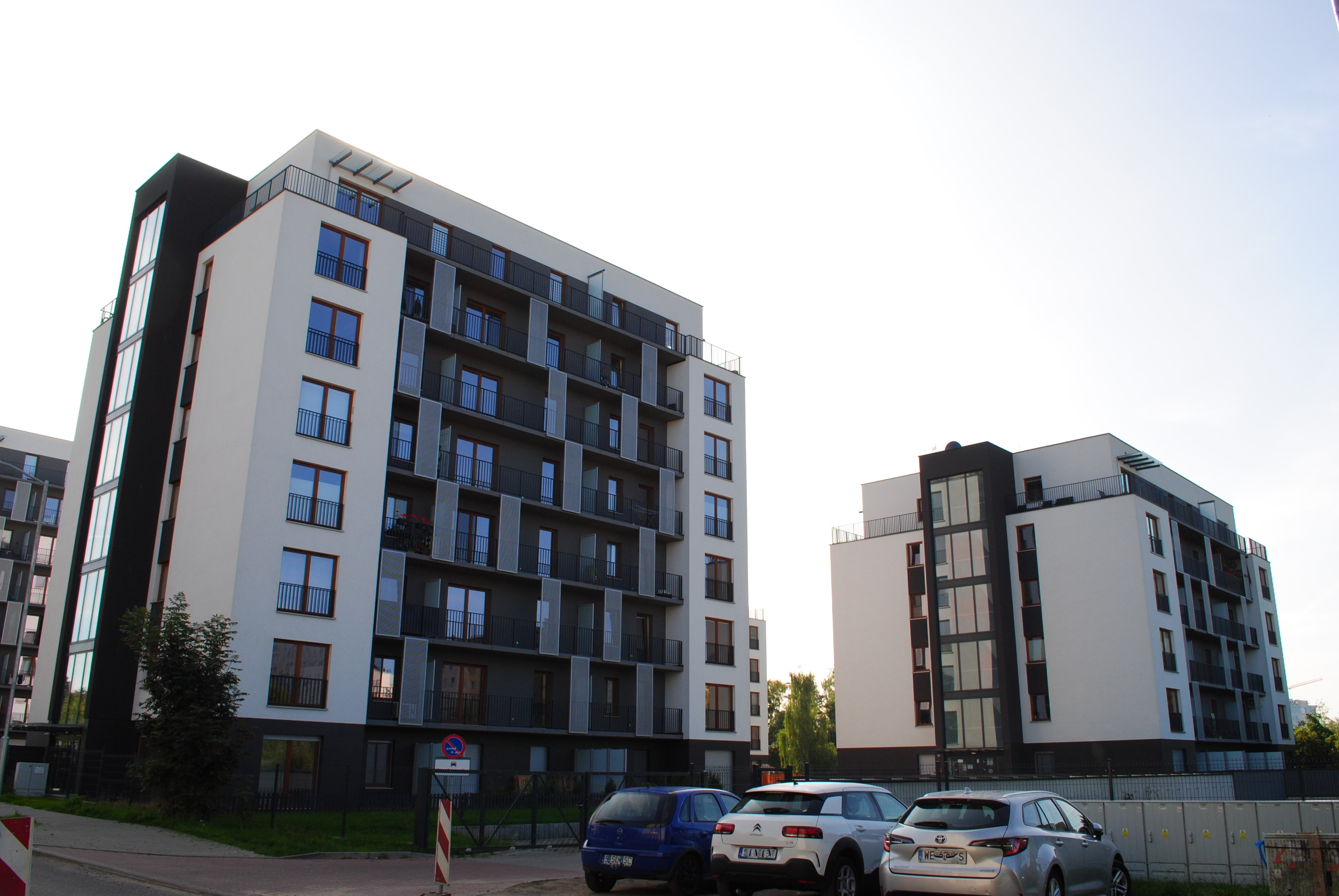
Part of the Nowa Słoneczna housing estate at Słoneczna Street

=== Historic buildings ===
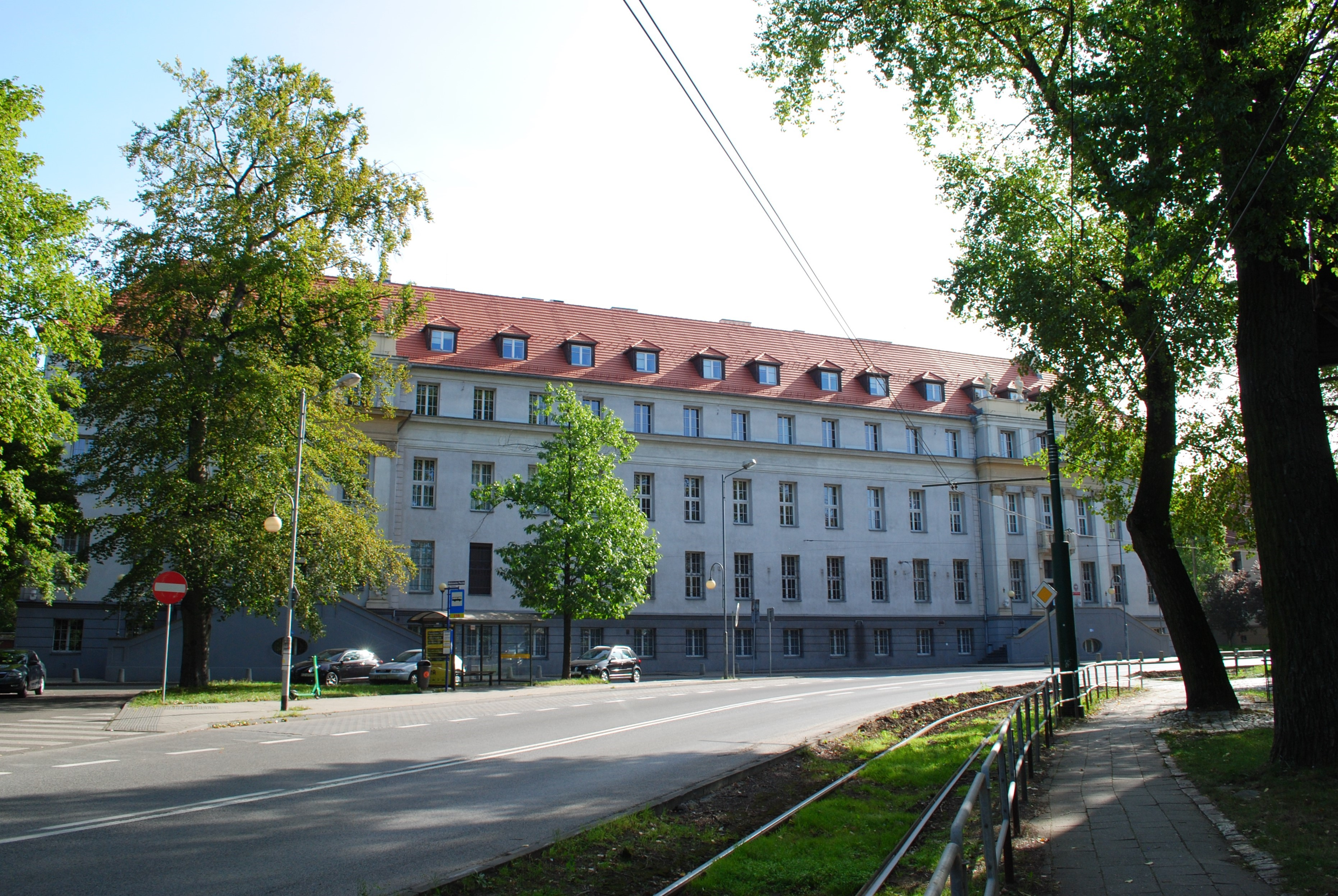
Historic building of the Court of Appeals at 117/119 Wojciech Korfanty Avenue

There are two buildings listed in the Registry of Cultural Property in Wełnowiec-Józefowiec. There was also another building that was later removed from the register and demolished. These are:

- the historic building of the Court of Appeals (117/119 Wojciech Korfanty Avenue), listed in the Registry of Cultural Property (reg. no.: A/1664/97 of 15 December 1997). The building and its staircase are under protection;
- the former distillation furnace hall at the Silesia Metallurgical Works (141 Wojciech Korfanty Avenue), listed in the Registry of Cultural Property (reg. no.: 1385/89 of 30 May 1989). It was built in 1913 in the modern style. It was removed from the register by decision of the Minister of Culture of 4 April 2005 and demolished;
- the Alfred shaft complex (182 and 184 Wojciech Korfanty Avenue, 1–13 Alfred Square), listed in the Registry of Cultural Property (reg. no.: 1228/78 of 19 August 1978) along with the structures of the former Alfred Coal Mine: locomotive shed, workshops, boiler room, engine room, headframe, bathhouse, changing room, smithy, stable, and two residential houses. The buildings date from 1910 and were constructed in the historicist and moderni styles. The old tree stand was also entered in the register.

== Transport ==
=== Road transport ===
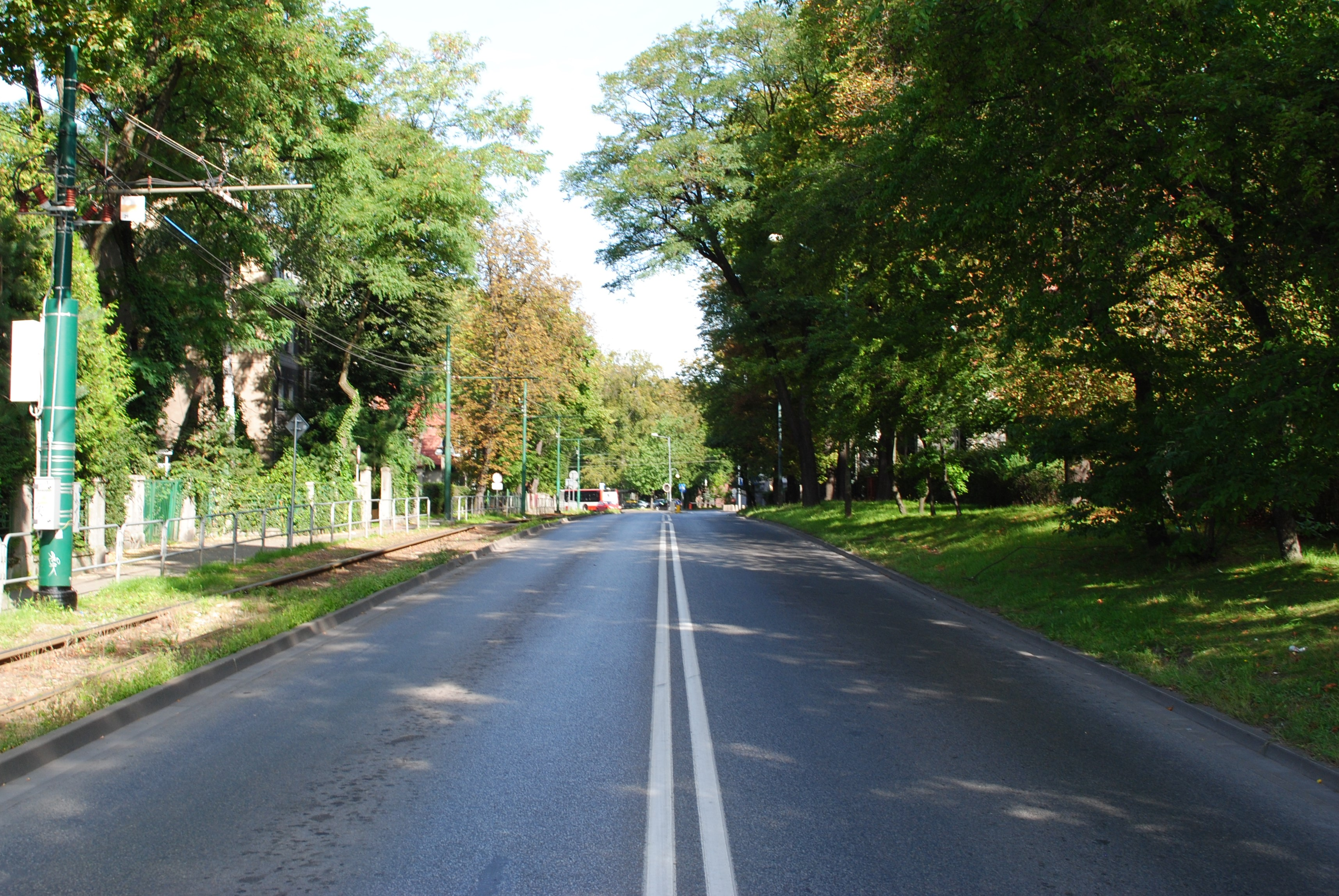
Wojciech Korfanty Avenue near Cisowa Street

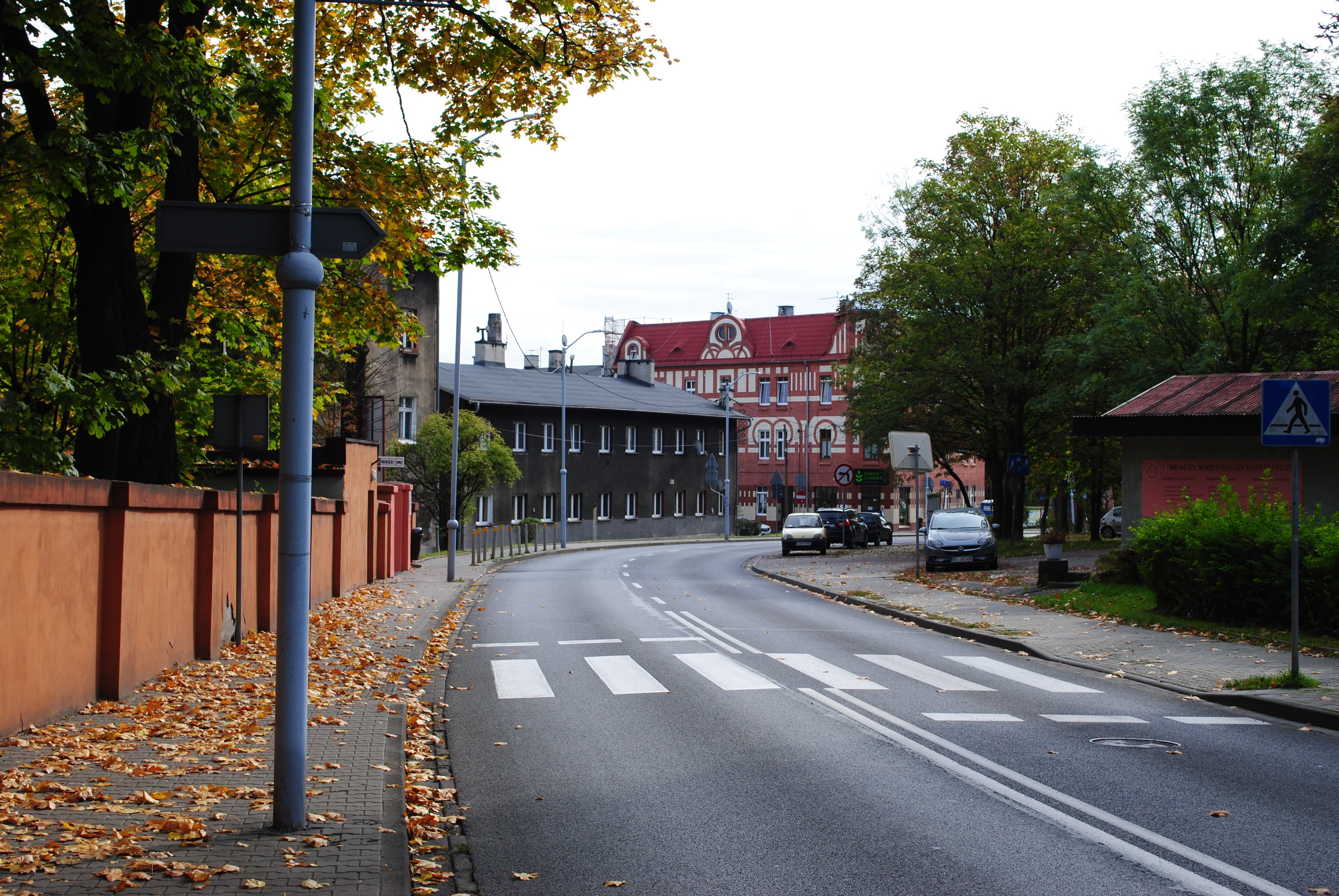
Józefowska Street near the Katowice Oncology Center

No national or voivodeship roads pass through Wełnowiec-Józefowiec. The main streets running through the district include:

- Wojciech Korfanty Avenue – a collector county road. It runs north-south and provides a connection to the south with Koszutka and Śródmieście, and to the north with Siemianowice Śląskie;
- Józefowska Street – a local county road. It runs north-south, connecting in the north with Bytkowska Street within the Agnieszka Colony, providing a connection further north to Siemianowice Śląskie, while in the south it intersects with Słoneczna Street;
- Słoneczna Street – a local county road. It runs parallel to the meridian, connecting Wełnowiec-Józefowiec with Dąb, and to the east with Koszutka;
- Piotr Ściegienny Street – a collector county road, running along the western side of the district. It connects Józefowiec with Dąb near the Dębowe Tarasy housing estate;
- Bytkowska Street – a collector municipal road. It connects Wełnowiec-Józefowiec with Dąb to the south and Bytków to the north;
- Telewizyjna Street – a road on the border between Wełnowiec-Józefowiec and Siemianowice Śląskie, which heads westward through Węzłowiec to Chorzów Stary, and eastward to Siemianowice Śląskie.

Other major roads in Wełnowiec-Józefowiec include the following streets: Bytomska Street (on the border between Józefowiec and Wełnowiec; a local municipal road), Gnieźnieńska Street (a local county road), J. Mikusiński Street, and Szczecińska Street.

In terms of the quality of connections between the individual macro-regions of Katowice, the area of Józefowiec and Koszutka has the best connections with Śródmieście thanks to Wojciech Korfanty Avenue and the streets running parallel to it, as well as with Bogucice and Pniaki. Józefowiec and Koszutka have insufficient connections with Ligota, Brynów, Piotrowice and Kostuchna.

=== Rail transport ===
There is currently no railway line running through Wełnowiec-Józefowiec, but in the past, an industrial spur ran parallel to the border between Józefowiec and Wełnowiec, connecting Katowice with the present-day Katowice Dąbrówka Mała railway station. This line ran northward from the south along Jan Nepomucen Stęślicki Street, east of the ZPUE plant and the Lidl store, and further north parallel to C. K. Norwid Street. It was launched on 1 December 1859 as a standard-gauge line used for freight traffic. It was dismantled in 1992.

=== Urban public transport ===
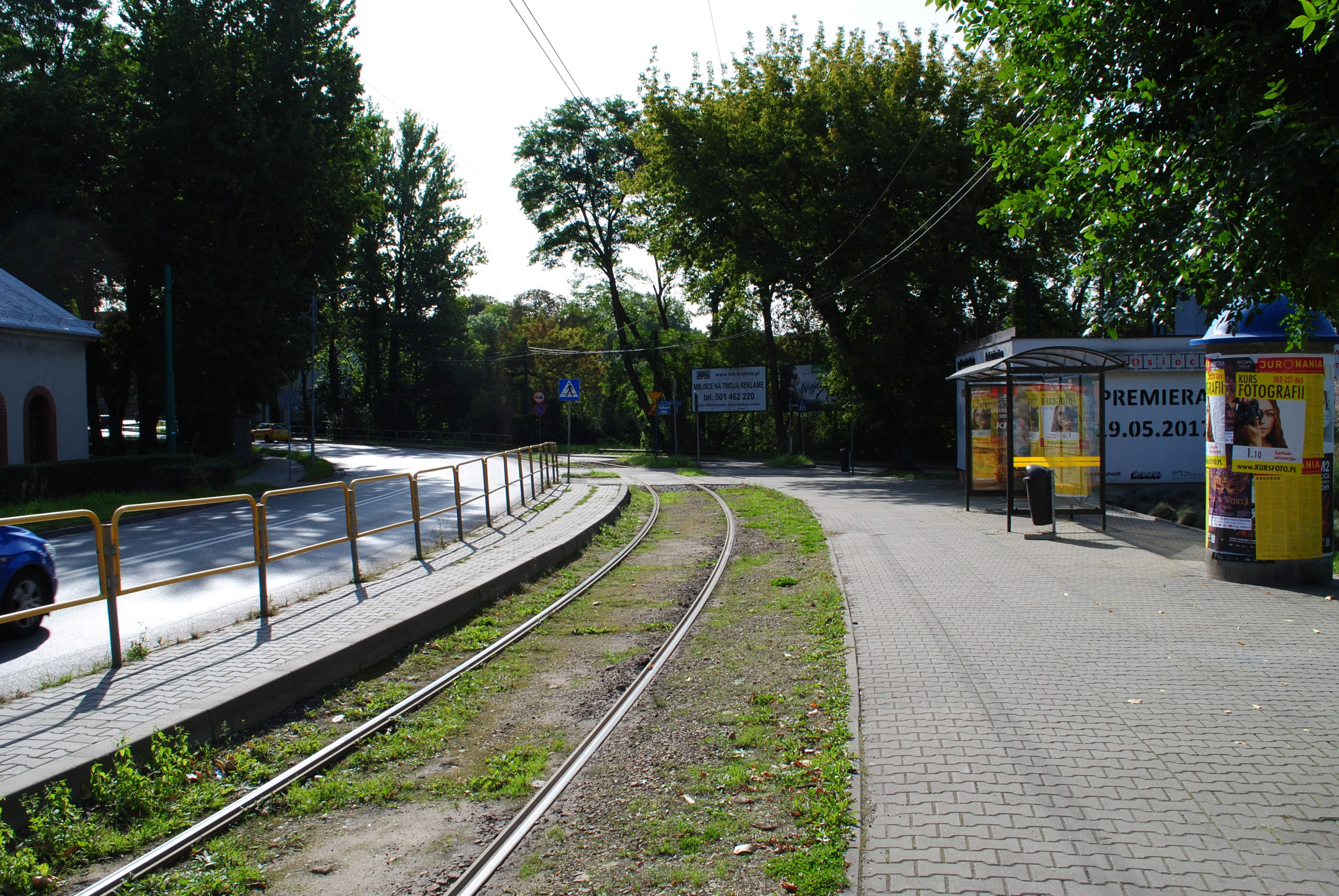
Tram line along Wojciech Korfanty Avenue near the Wełnowiec church (2020)

A tram line runs through Wełnowiec-Józefowiec along Wojciech Korfanty Avenue. Its origins date back to the late 19th century, when the Berlin-based company Kramer & Co. applied for a concession to build a narrow-gauge steam tram line between Królewska Huta, Dąb, Katowice, Wełnowiec, and Huta Laura. Shortly after obtaining the concession, the first section from the Marta plant (at the present-day Jerzy Ziętek Square) to Huta Laura was completed on 23 March 1896 and put into service on 30 December 1896. The line was soon electrified. On 25 July 1900, the line connecting Huta Laura with Królewska Huta (Chorzów), running along what is now Telewizyjna Street, was opened. It was discontinued on 1 January 2009 and was served by tram line No. 12. In October 1942, a temporary tram terminus was put into service in the area of the current Alfred Square, which was later dismantled, and a new one was built in 1956 at its current location. Currently, as of February 2021, two tram lines run through Wełnowiec-Józefowiec with an average frequency of eight one-way trips per day during weekday rush hours. These lines connect the district to the north with Piotr Skarga Square in Siemianowice Śląskie, and to the south with Freedom Square in Śródmieście and the tram terminus in Brynów (Katowice Brynów transit hub) through Koszutka.

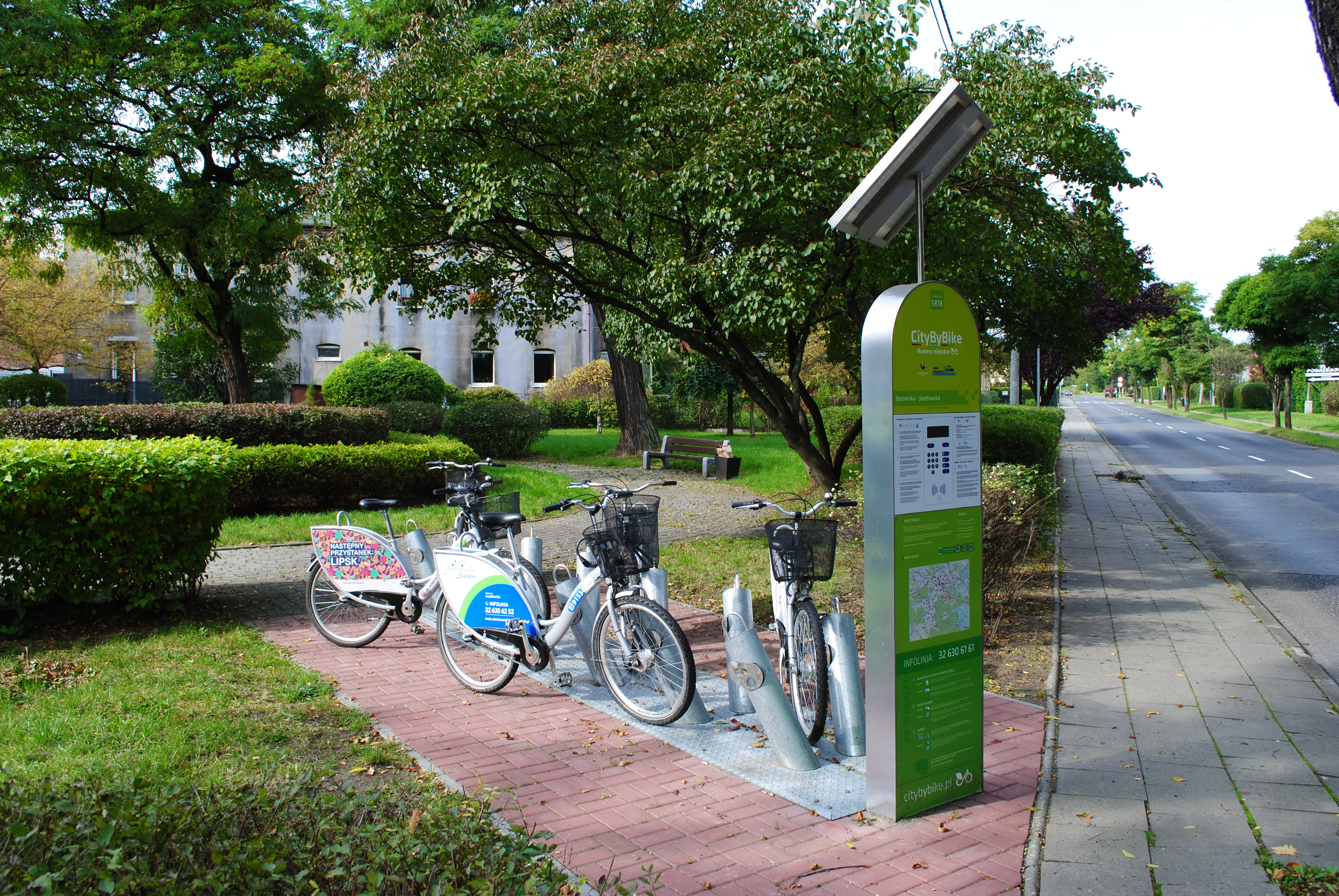
City by bike station Bytomska-Józefowska, which was located at the B. Kałuża Square

The first bus routes passing through Wełnowiec were launched in the 1920s. On 22 October 1927, the Schlesische Kleinbahn company opened hourly service on the route between Katowice, Wełnowiec, Chorzów, and Bytom. In 1929, buses operated by the Automobile Communication Company, founded a year earlier, ran routes between Katowice, Wełnowiec, Chorzów (Stary), Królewska Huta, and Bytom. On 1 November 1929, the municipal special-purpose association Śląskie Linie Autobusowe began operations, launching its first route between Katowice and Siemianowice. Currently, as of mid-February 2021, public transportation in Wełnowiec is organized by the Metropolitan Transport Authority. There are 7 bus stops in Wełnowiec: Bytkowska Centrum Targowe, Telewizja Katowice, Wełnowiec Gnieźnieńska, Wełnowiec GPP Business Park, Wełnowiec Kościół, Wełnowiec Plac Alfreda, and Wełnowiec Poczta. Seven bus routes operate from the Wełnowiec Plac Alfreda stop. In Józefowiec, there are six stops: Józefowiec Cmentarz, Józefowiec Jabłoniowa, Józefowiec Osiedle, Józefowiec Szczecińska, Józefowiec Szpital, and Józefowiec Ściegiennego. As of early February 2021, five bus lines depart from the Józefowiec Szczecińska stop. The lines running through Wełnowiec-Józefowiec provide direct connections to most districts of Katowice (including Dąbrówka Mała, Dąb, Giszowiec, Koszutka, Szopienice-Burowiec, Śródmieście, and Osiedle Witosa), as well as with some neighboring cities of Metropolis GZM, namely Piekary Śląskie and Siemianowice Śląskie.

=== Cycling infrastructure ===
In Wełnowiec-Józefowiec, dedicated bicycle lanes run along Konduktorska Street, the northern part of Wojciech Korfanty Avenue, Telewizyjna Street, and the northern part of Bytkowska Street. However, no marked bicycle trails run through the district. In February 2021, there were four City by bike municipal bicycle stations there: Bytomska-Józefowska, GPP Business Park, Szczecińska-Nowowiejskiego, and Ściegiennego-Krzyżowa. This system was replaced by Metrorower.

== Education ==
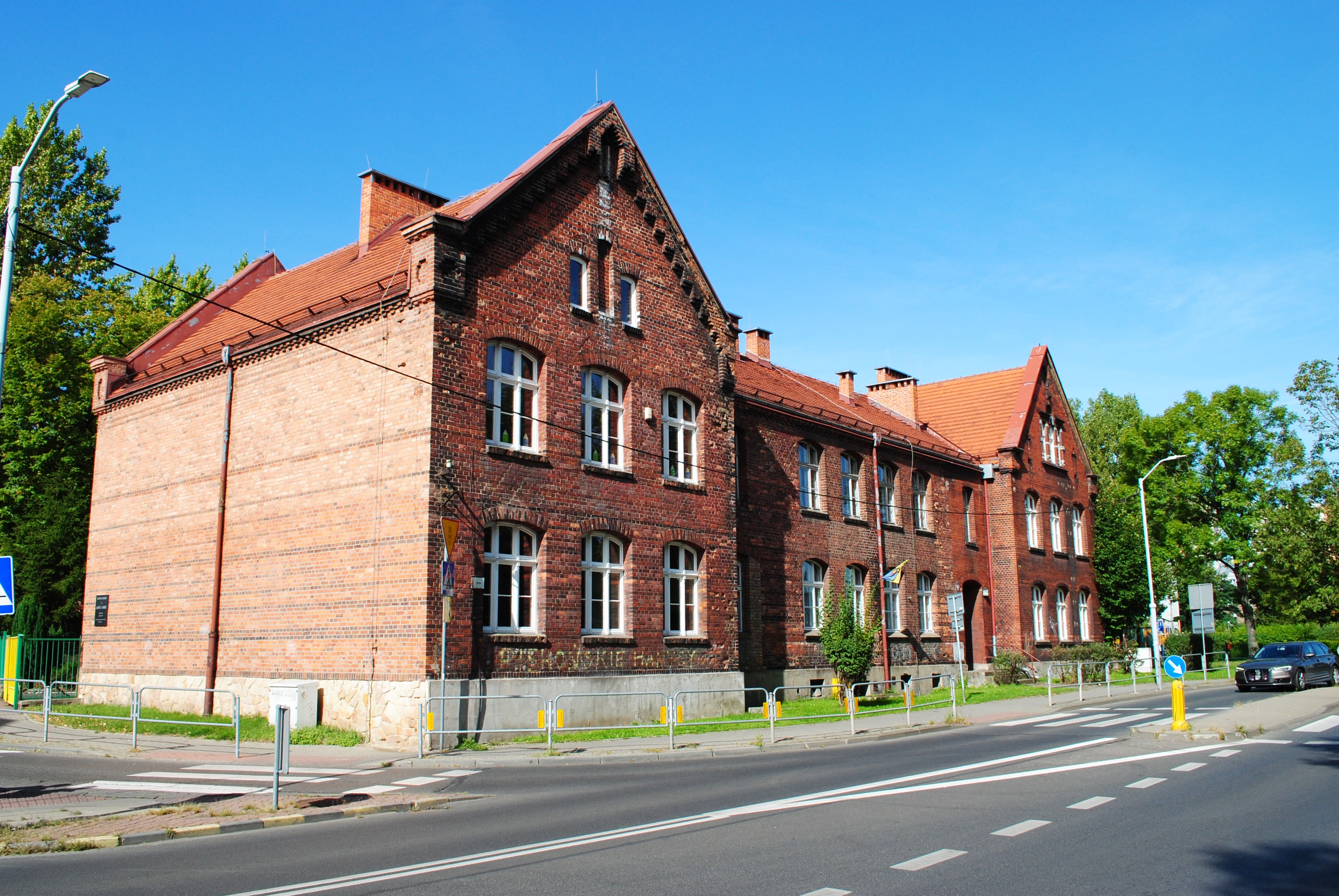
Branch of T. Kościuszko Primary School No. 17 at 52 Józefowska Street

The beginnings of educational activities in Wełnowiec-Józefowiec date back to 1830. It was then that the now-defunct school in Wełnowiec was opened at the intersection of present-day Wojciech Korfanty Avenue and M. Karłowicz Street. In 1922, after Wełnowiec was incorporated into Poland, this institution became a Polish school. It was then named Public Primary School No. 1. Due to overcrowding, the school was moved to a new building in February 1939, constructed in the International Style, on the current J. Dekert Street.

In Józefowiec, a school was constructed in 1901 on present-day Józefowska Street (now a branch of Primary School No. 17), and a second school was established there in 1910 (or at the end of the 19th century and expanded between 1904 and 1907) – now the building of Major Henryk Sucharski XIV High School. In 1912, a Home Economics School was established in Józefowiec – as part of its curriculum, it offered several-month-long courses for girls. During the interwar period, the second school in Józefowiec housed the four-year Karol Miarka Primary School.

In 1959, a Vocational School Complex for Working Adults was established in the same school under the auspices of Elektromontaż. The building of the first school in Józefowiec became a branch of Primary School No. 17 during the 1993/1994 school year. XIV High School was established on 1 July 1998. The second of the primary schools in Józefowiec – Primary School No. 19 – was established in Dąb as School No. 2. It moved to its current location at 12 Krzyżowa Street in 2017.

== Culture ==
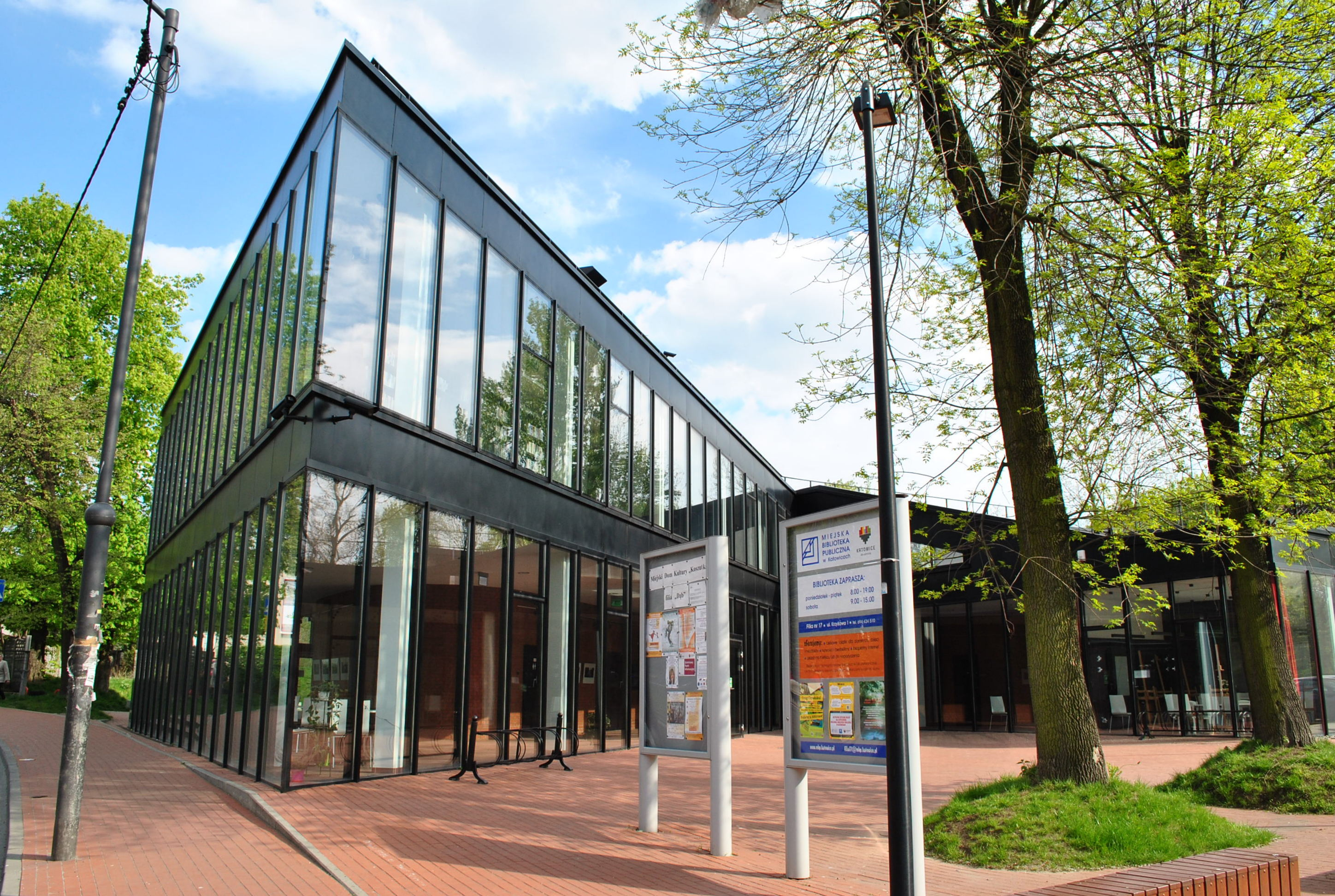
Building of the Dąb branch of the Koszutka Municipal Cultural Center and Branch No. 17 of the Katowice Municipal Public Library at 1 Krzyżowa Street, on the boundary of Dąb and Wełnowiec-Józefowiec

The first social and cultural organizations were established in the mid-19th century in the Wełnowiec area. At the turn of the 19th and 20th centuries, two choirs were active in the present-day district: the Männer Gesangverein and the Arberiter Gesangverein Josephdorf-Domb. Cultural activities at that time were also organized by a branch of the Upper Silesian Association of People's Libraries (German: Der Verband Oberschlesischer Volksbücherei), on whose initiative film screenings were held for the residents of Wełnowiec. A People’s Reading Room was also established, as well as a Women’s Reading Room, where Polish literature was promoted. In Józefowiec, the Harmonia mixed choir was founded in 1908. It had about 100 members during the interwar period and remained active until 1961. In Wełnowiec, the Adam Mickiewicz Choir was established in 1920 and operated until 1931. During the interwar period, present-day Wełnowiec-Józefowiec was home to, among others, a branch of the People's Libraries Society, the S. Żeromski Workers' Educational and Cultural Society, and the Promień Theatre Group. The St. Cecilia Choir, affiliated with the Polish Association of Choirs and Orchestras, operates at the Parish of St. Joseph the Worker in Józefowiec. It was founded in September 1971 and is conducted by Mariusz Kozieł. In the early 1990s, the Wełnowiec Enthusiasts Society was established, which, among other things, organized annual festivals such as Wełnowiec-Józefowiec Day, and on 24 July 2015, the Revita Association of Residents, Friends and Supporters of Wełnowiec-Józefowiec, whose goals include supporting local initiatives and preserving and protecting cultural heritage.

There is no branch of the Municipal Cultural Center in Wełnowiec-Józefowiec. The nearest cultural center is the Dąb branch of the Koszutka Municipal Cultural Center, located at 1 Krzyżowa Street. It also houses Branch No. 17 of the Katowice Municipal Public Library. In addition, the Józefinka Cooperative Club, managed by the Katowice Housing Cooperative, operates at 100 Józefowska Street. Wełnowiec-Józefowiec is also home to Branch No. 6 of the Katowice Municipal Public Library, located at 8a Bytomska Street .

== Sport and recreation ==
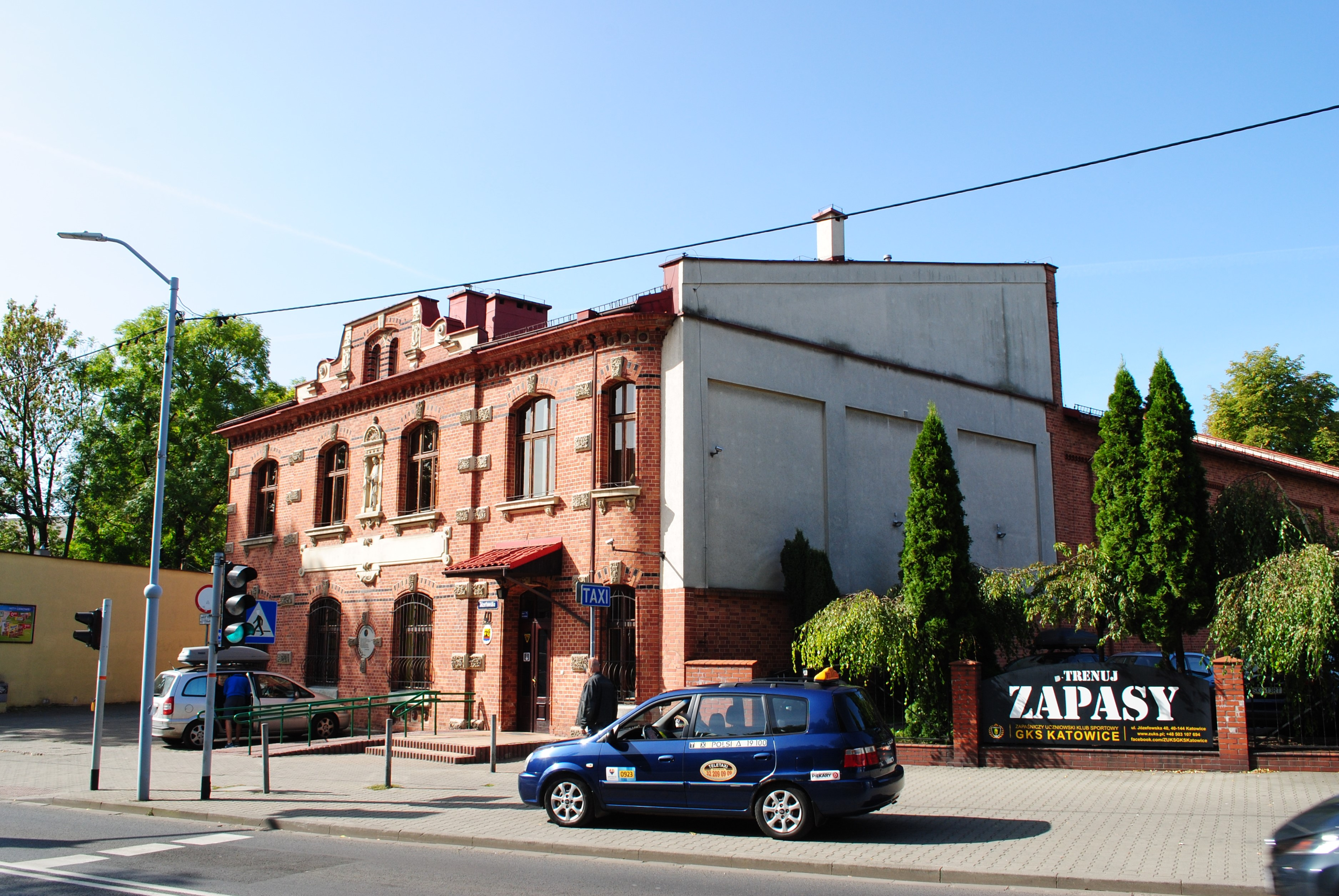
Józefowska Sports and Recreation Center Hall, housed in the former Geisler restaurant building at 40 Józefowska Street (2020)

The origins of sports activities in Wełnowiec date back to the early 20th century. At that time, the Turnverein gymnastics club and the Radfahrer Verein were active in the area. On 30 March 1924, former activists of the Dąb-Józefowiec branch established the Sokół Gymnastic Society in Wełnowiec, which was a branch in the Siemianowice district of the Silesian Division of the Union of Sokół Gymnastic Societies in Poland. In 1935, it had 140 members and offered athletics and apparatus gymnastics.

The first sports associations in Józefowiec were also established at the beginning of the 20th century. In 1905, the Turnverein Sports Association was founded, which a year later expanded to cover the entire Gmina Dąb under the name Männer Turn Verein Domb. A few years later, the Spielverein was established – separately for Dąb and Józefowiec. On 12 February 1912, the Dąb-Józefowiec branch of the Sokół Gymnastic Society was established. In 1920, it had 113 members. In the same year, the Orzeł Sports Club was created in Józefowiec.

During the interwar period, the following organizations were active, among others: KS 25, KS Haller, KS Powstaniec, RKS Siła Wełnowiec (football and handball sections), the Sport Cyclists' Society, and KS Hetman. From 1935 to 1939, Strzelec Wełnowiec was a sports club with sections for boxing, weightlifting, team sports, cycling, athletics, skiing, and table tennis.

During World War II, the only club in Wełnowiec was the Hohenlohehütter Turn- und Sportverein, which operated under the patronage of the Hohenlohe Group. After World War II, it operated as Orzeł Wełnowiec. In 1949, it had 375 members. In the postwar years, the Rapid Wełnowiec club also operated under the patronage of the Mining Tools Factory. Among other things, it ran a volleyball section from 1959 to 1963. In 1963, it merged with Orzeł Wełnowiec. In 1964, Orzeł and Rapid became part of GKS Katowice. A year later, the soccer section of Kolejarz 24 Katowice moved to Wełnowiec.

Kolejarz Sports Center is located at 1 Alfred Street, managed by the Municipal Sports and Recreation Center. It consists of: a sports hall with a wooden court for volleyball and handball, a fencing hall, an indoor gym, a conference room, sports fields, locker rooms, and a parking lot. This complex is used by the Kolejarz 24 Katowice Sports Club, founded in May 1924 on the initiative of Stanisław Nogaj and Edmund Zeller. In Józefowiec, a sports hall managed by the Sports and Recreation Center is located at 40 Józefowska Street, in the building of the former Carl Geisler restaurant. Under the guidance of Jan Czaja, GKS Katowice wrestlers trained there, winning numerous medals, including three Olympic medals.

== Religion ==
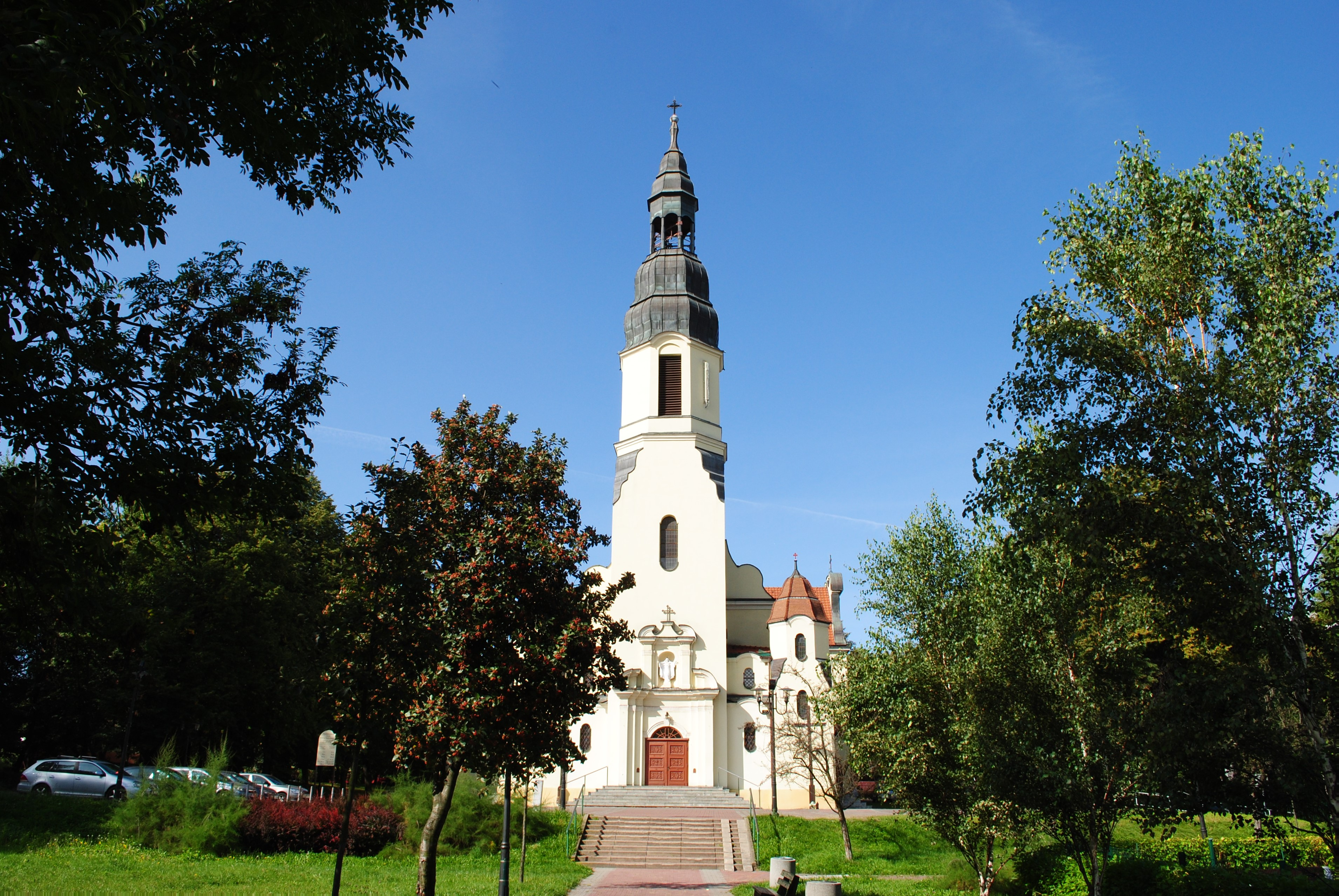
Church of the Parish of St. Joseph the Worker in Józefowiec (2020)

Wełnowiec-Józefowiec is home to two Roman Catholic parishes, one of which serves the faithful of Józefowiec and the Agnieszka Colony, and the other those of Wełnowiec. Both are part of the Katowice-Załęże deanery in the Archdiocese of Katowice.

In Józefowiec, there is the Roman Catholic Parish of St. Joseph the Worker, located at 8 J. Mikusiński Street. The parish manages a cemetery on Józefowska Street covering an area of 1.93 hectares. In 1895, efforts began to establish a parish in Józefowiec, and in 1919, a branch of the Dąb parish was created. Construction of a temporary church also began. In 1921, Father Paweł Michatz was appointed as a curate. An independent parish was established on 1 August 1925.

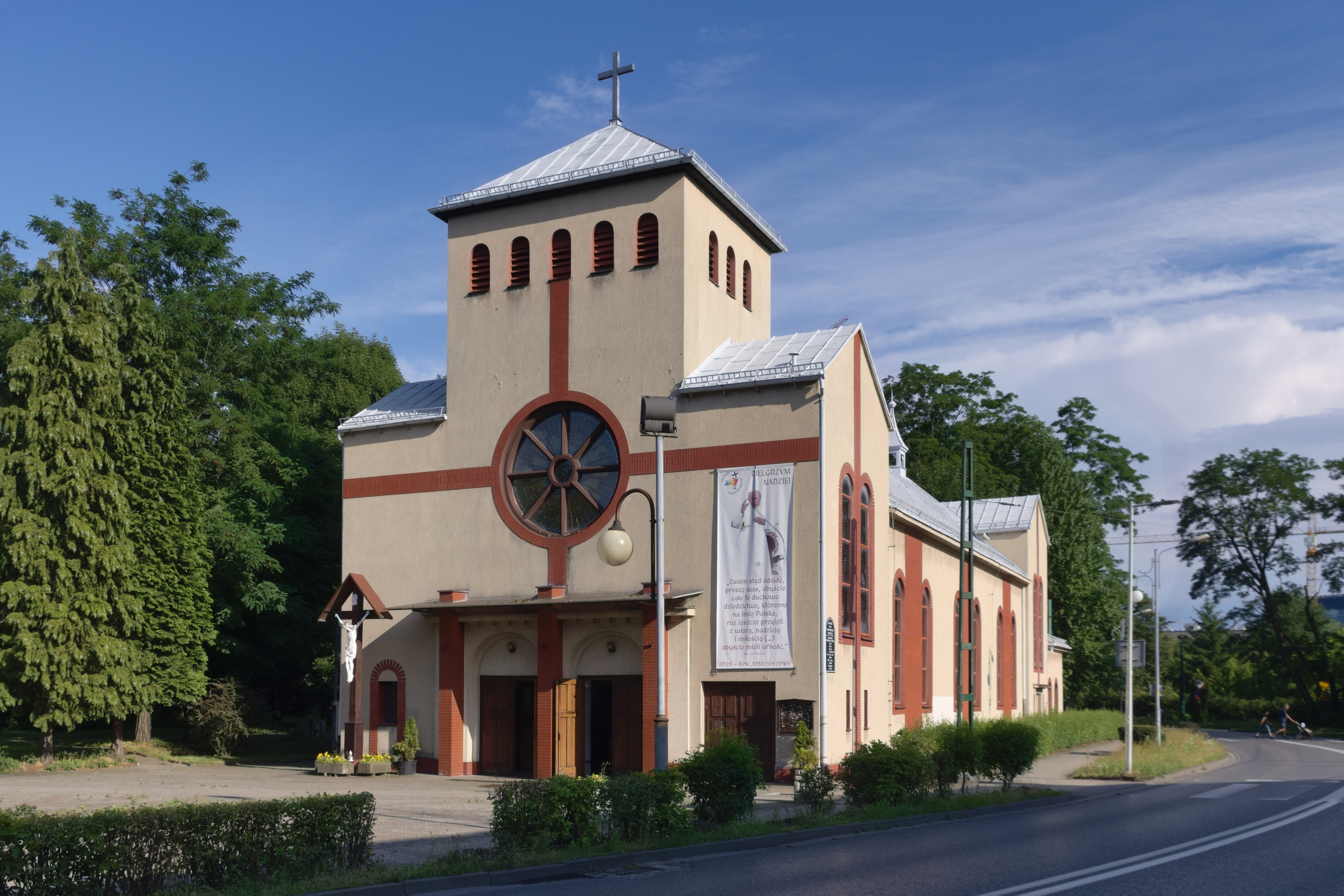
Church of the Parish of Our Lady Help of Christians in Wełnowiec

In Wełnowiec, there is a Roman Catholic parish dedicated to Our Lady Help of Christians. In addition to Wełnowiec, its jurisdiction also covers part of Osiedle Tuwima in Siemianowice Śląskie. The parish's seat is at 121/1 Wojciech Korfanty Avenue. It manages a cemetery on Jesionowa Street with an area of 0.58 hectares. Originally, Roman Catholic parishioners from Wełnowiec belonged to the parish community of St. Michael the Archangel in Michałkowice. In 1919, construction of the church began, converting a building from the early 19th century. In 1920, the church was consecrated by Father Maksymilian Gerlich from the parish in Michałkowice. The building acquired its current form after reconstruction in 1930. A painting of the Mother of God from the mother church in Michałkowice was placed in the main altar, likely dating from the 17th century.

Protestants also lived in present-day Wełnowiec-Józefowiec. According to a statute adopted in 1857, the congregants from Dąb and Wełnowiec belonged to the congregation in Katowice. Jews who had previously lived in part of Wełnowiec (i.e., from Ignacowiec) were incorporated into Gmina Katowice in 1872, and in 1878, believers from Józefowiec and the remaining part of Wełnowiec were incorporated into it.

In the first half of the 19th century, approximately 1,200 Catholics, 70 Evangelicals, and 30 Jews lived in Wełnowiec. In the 1820s, there were five Jews in Wełnowiec. In the 1820s there were five persons of the Jewish faith in Wełnowiec. In 1890, there were 1,258 Catholics, 30 Evangelicals, and 10 Jews in Józefowiec.

== Public safety ==
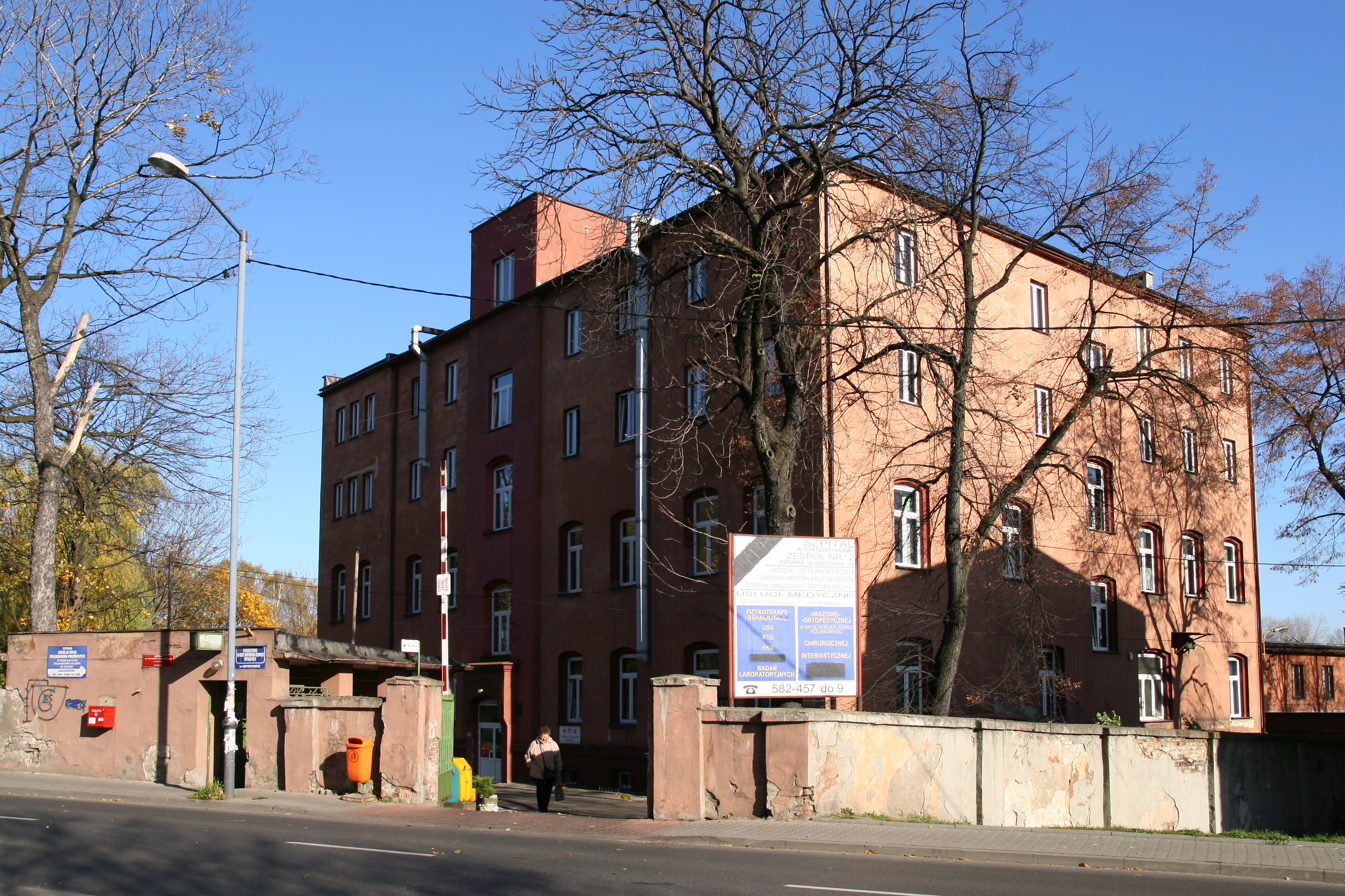
Complex No. 2 of the Katowice Oncology Center at Józefowska Street

Based on its crime rate, Wełnowiec-Józefowiec is classified as an area where the number of crimes was lower than the citywide average. In 2007, this rate was 2.1 crimes per 100 residents, while the citywide average at that time was 3.08. During that period, 12 traffic accidents were also recorded. In Wełnowiec-Józefowiec, the intersection of Józefowska and Słoneczna streets is a location with a higher accident rate. In a 2012 survey, 67.2% of respondents from Wełnowiec-Józefowiec indicated that they felt safe in their district, while 28.3% disagreed. The police in Wełnowiec had their own building near the church. It also housed apartments for police officers and a detention facility.

The fire department in Wełnowiec-Józefowiec was established as a plant fire brigade by Hohenlohe-Werke in 1906. Its mission also included providing fire protection for other plants and residential buildings in Wełnowiec. Its headquarters were located at the present-day 11–13 M. Karłowicz Street. In 1938, the fire department had 76 members. In 1962, a municipal unit of the State Fire Department was established in the building, but it was disbanded 10 years later due to unsuitable premises.

The hospital in Wełnowiec was established in 1890 as a steelworks hospital, originally a two-story building with two wards. The Sisters of Mercy of St. Charles Borromeo from Trzebnica cared for the patients. The hospital was rebuilt during the interwar period. During World War II, it housed a military hospital, and in 1949, it was designated for prisoners of labor camps. Between 1978 and 1980, the hospital was rebuilt again and then converted into the General Surgery Ward of Municipal Hospital No. 8. On 31 October 1998, the hospital was merged with the facility on Raciborska Street, creating Stanisław Leszczyński Hospital. Currently, it is part of the Katowice Oncology Center as Complex No. 2. In 2018, 16 doctors were employed there.

== Bibliography ==
- Barciak, Antoni; Chojecka, Ewa; Fertacz, Sylwester, eds. (2012). Katowice. Środowisko, dzieje, kultura, język i społeczeństwo [Katowice: Environment, History, Culture, Language and Society] (in Polish). Vol. 1–2. Katowice: Museum of the History of Katowice. ISBN 978-83-87727-24-6.
- Bartoszek, Adam; Czekaj, Krzysztof; Trawkowska, Dobroniega (2012). Diagnoza problemów społecznych i monitoring polityki społecznej dla aktywizacji zasobów ludzkich w Katowicach [Diagnosis of Social Problems and Monitoring of Social Policy for the Activation of Human Resources in Katowice] (in Polish). Katowice: University of Silesia. ISBN 978-83-61061-97-7.
- Bulsa, Michał (2018). Ulice i place Katowic [Streets and Squares of Katowice] (in Polish) (3rd ed.). Katowice: Prasa i Książka. ISBN 978-83-63780-28-9.
- Drobek, Daria; Michalska, Ewa; Radecki, Ryszard; Perdyła, Magdalena (January 2014). Opracowanie ekofizjograficzne podstawowe z elementami opracowania ekofizjograficznego problemowego (problematyka ochrony dolin rzecznych oraz ograniczeń dla zagospodarowania terenu wynikających z wpływu działalności górniczej) dla potrzeb opracowania projektów miejscowych planów zagospodarowania przestrzennego obszarów położonych w mieście Katowice [Basic Ecophysiographic Study with Elements of a Problem-Oriented Ecophysiographic Study (Issues of River Valley Protection and Constraints on Land Development Resulting from the Impact of Mining Activity) for the Purposes of Preparing Draft Local Spatial Development Plans for Areas Located within the City of Katowice] (in Polish). Katowice: Werona.
- Drobniak, Adam; Polko, Adam; Plac, Klaudia, eds. (2014). Diagnoza sytuacji społeczno-ekonomicznej Miasta Katowice wraz z wyznaczeniem obszarów rewitalizacji i analizą strategiczną [Diagnosis of the Socio-economic Situation of the City of Katowice together with the Designation of Regeneration Areas and Strategic Analysis] (PDF) (in Polish). Katowice: City of Katowice.
- Fajer, Maria (2008). "Gleby na obszarze Górnośląskiego Związku Metropolitalnego" [Soils in the Area of the Metropolitan Association of Upper Silesia]. In Dulias, Renata; Hibszer, Adam (eds.). Górnośląski Związek Metropolitalny. Zarys geograficzny [Metropolitan Association of Upper Silesia. A Geographical Outline] (in Polish). Sosnowiec: Polish Geographical Society. ISBN 978-83-61695-00-4.
- Rzewiczok, Urszula (1999). Dzieje Dębu (1299–1999) [History of Dąb (1299–1999)] (in Polish). Katowice: Museum of history of Katowice. ISBN 83-87727-30-X.
- Rzewiczok, Urszula (2019). Wełnowiec i Józefowiec. Dzieje dzielnicy Katowic [Wełnowiec and Józefowiec. History of a Katowice District] (in Polish). Museum of History of Katowice. ISBN 978-83-64356-32-2.
- Szaraniec, Lech (1996). Osady i osiedla Katowic [Settlements and Housing Estates of Katowice] (in Polish). Katowice: Artur. ISBN 83-905115-0-9.
- Tokarska-Guzik, Barbara; Rostański, Adam; Kupka, Roman (2002). Katowice. Przyroda miasta [Katowice. Nature of the City] (in Polish). Katowice: Kubajak. ISBN 83-87971-49-9.
- Zemła, Marek, ed. (25 April 2012). Studium uwarunkowań i kierunków zagospodarowania przestrzennego miasta Katowice – II edycja. Część 1. Uwarunkowania zagospodarowania przestrzennego [Study of the Conditions and Directions of Spatial Development of the City of Katowice – Second Edition. Part One. Conditions of Spatial Development] (PDF) (in Polish). Katowice: Biuro Rozwoju Regionu.
