= Dąb, Katowice =

District of Katowice

Dąb
- Katowice District
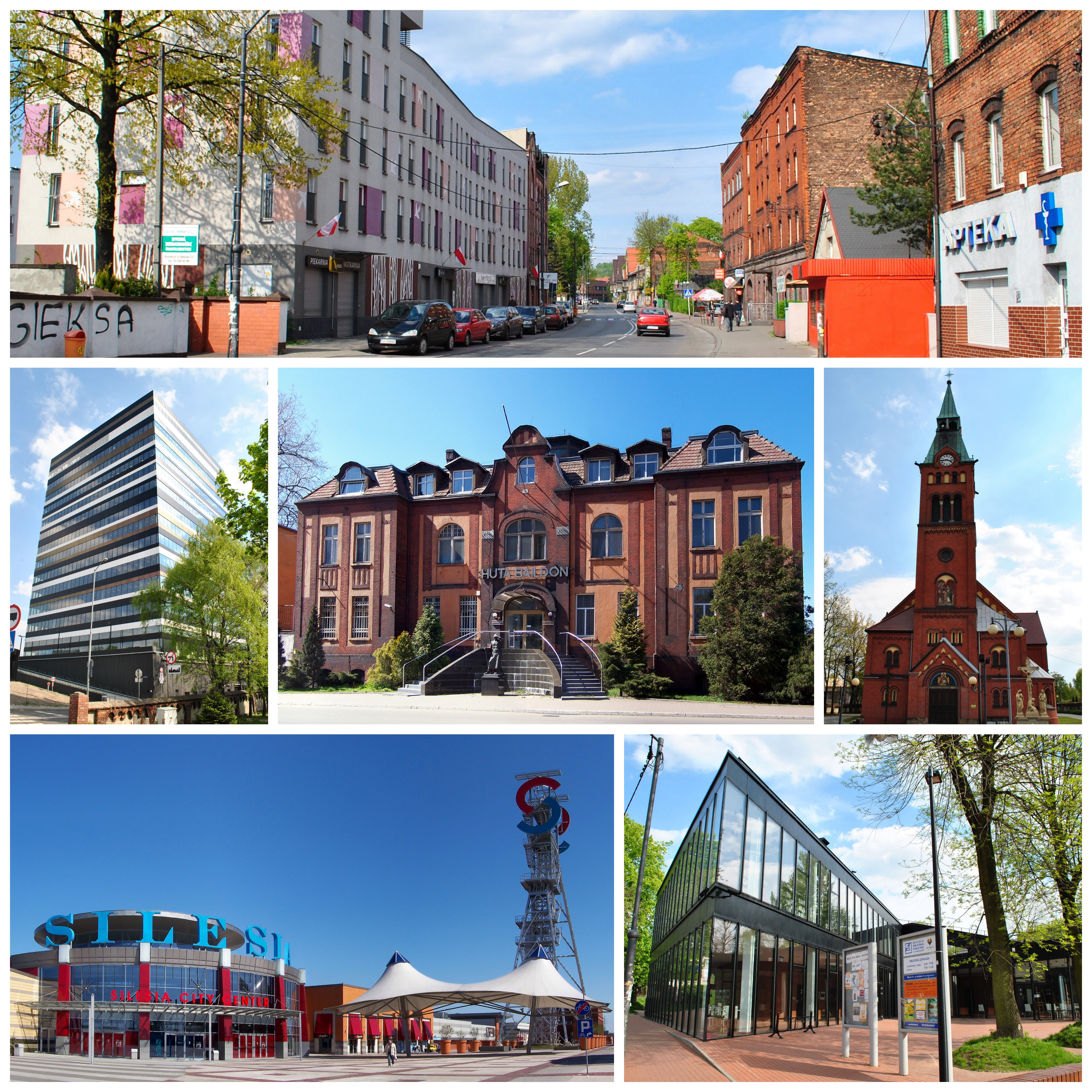
- Dębowa Street, Silesia Business Park on Chorzowska Street, the former directorate building of the Baildon Steelworks, Church of Saints John and Paul, Silesia City Center, Dąb branch of the Koszutka Municipal Cultural Center

- Coat of arms

- Location of Dąb within Katowice
- Coordinates: 50°16′26″N 18°59′57″E
- Country: Poland
- Voivodeship: Silesian
- County/City: Katowice
- Established: 1 January 1992

Area
  - Total: 1.86 km^{2} (0.72 sq mi)

Population (2007)
  - Total: 7,694
  - Density: 4,140/km^{2} (10,700/sq mi)
- Time zone: UTC+1 (CET)
  - Summer (DST): UTC+2 (CEST)
- Area code: (+48) 032

Dąb (German: Domb) is a part and a district of Katowice, located in the northern part of the city, by the Rawa river.

It is the earliest mentioned settlement within the current boundaries of Katowice. It was already recorded in a document from 19 March 1299, transferring the villages of Chorzów and Krasny Dąb to the monastery of the Canons Regular of the Holy Sepulchre, to which Dąb belonged until the 19th century. At the turn of the 19th and 20th centuries, Dąb experienced rapid development due to the establishment of new industrial facilities in the area, especially the Eminencja Coal Mine (renamed "Gottwald" in 1954 and "Kleofas" in 1990) and the Baildon Steelworks. In 1924, Dąb was incorporated into Katowice. Following the decline of major industrial plants at the end of the 20th century, and with the growth of the service and retail sectors, the district remains a multifunctional center.

The buildings of Dąb date mainly from the turn of the 19th and 20th centuries (they are concentrated mostly along the historic thoroughfares – Dębowa and Agnieszki streets – as well as the streets running perpendicular to them), with a significant proportion of postwar constructions. It is very well connected thanks to Drogowa Trasa Średnicowa and national road 79 (Chorzowska Street), as well as a tram line running parallel to the road toward Chorzów and Katowice's Śródmieście. It has an area of 1.86 km^{2} and in 2007 had 7,694 inhabitants.

== Geography ==
=== Location ===
Dąb is one of Katowice's administrative districts (no. 10), located in the northern group of districts. It borders with Wełnowice-Józefowiec on the north, Koszutka and Śródmieście on the east, Załęże on the south and Chorzów (with Silesian Park) and Osiedle Tysiąclecia on the west. The district's boundaries are as follows:

- from the north – along the city border with Chorzów, then along Agnieszki, Krzyżowa, and Piotr Ściegienny streets, before turning east at the Dębowe Tarasy housing estate;
- from the east – along Jan Nepomucen Stęślicki and F. W. Grundmann streets;
- from the south – along the center of the Rawa riverbed;
- from the west – along the boundary of the area owned by the Piast Housing Cooperative west of Bracka Street.

According to Jerzy Kondracki's physio-geographical regionalization, Koszutka is located in the Katowice Upland mesoregion, forming the southern part of the Silesian Upland, which itself is a part of the Silesian-Kraków Upland subprovince.

=== Geology and soils ===
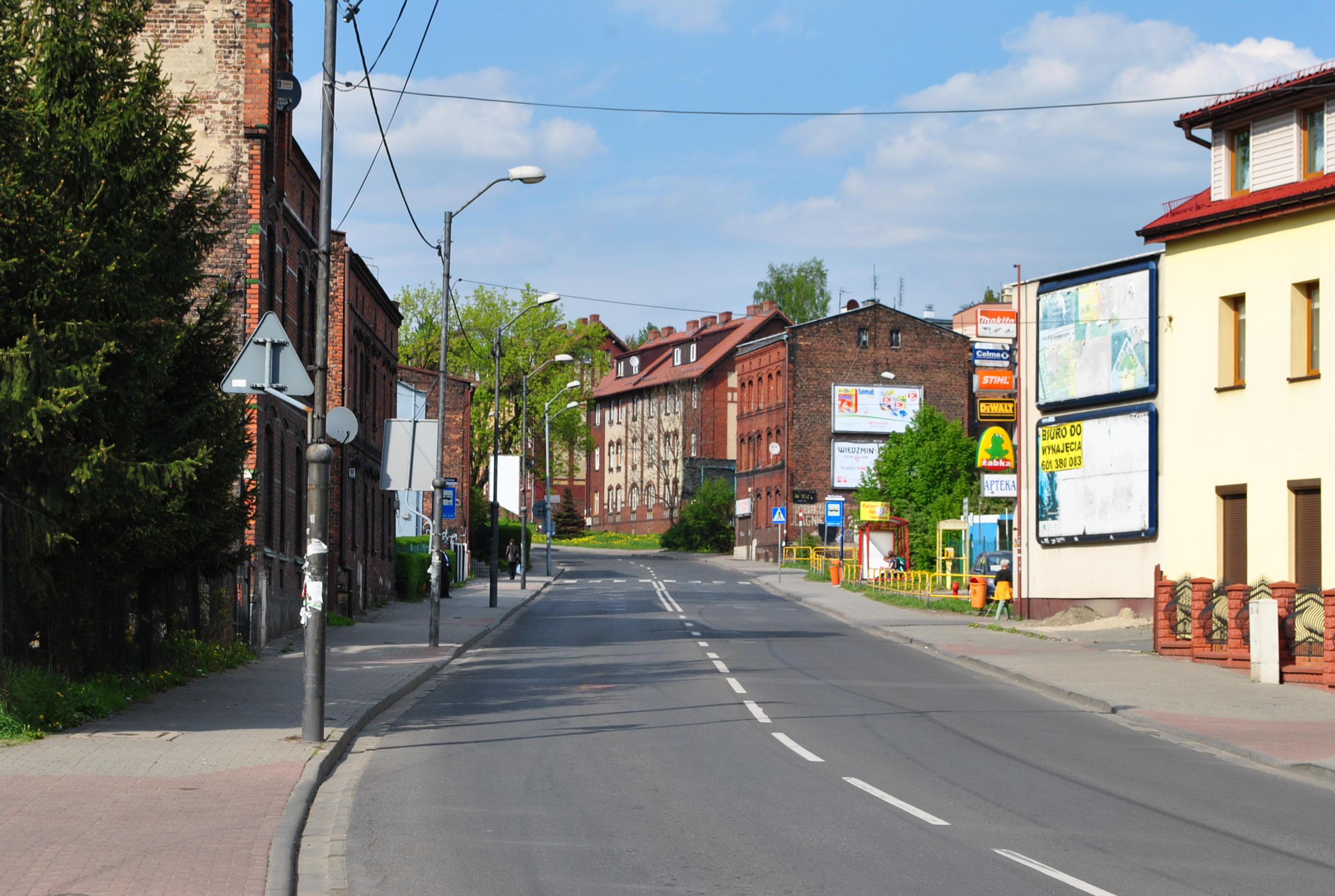
Agnieszki Street; one of the streets in Dąb that runs along the slopes of the Chorzów Hills (2015)

Dąb is located in the Upper Silesian Sinkhole, which forms the northern part of the large Silesian-Moravian geological structure. This structure is filled with Upper Carboniferous formations, especially the coal-bearing Ruda layers (Westphalian A), which lie within the Paleozoic structures of the Central Polish Uplands. These strata, along with younger ones, cover the vast majority of district (except for a small, higher-elevation area near Złota and Bukowa streets and the vicinity of Kolonia Agnieszki) and are overlain by Quaternary formations, mainly of glacial origin, formed during the Mindel glaciation. They consist mostly of till, its weathered products, and glacial sands and gravels, while in the northern part they also include sandstones, conglomerates, mudstones, and claystones.

Soils in Dąb have been subjected to intense anthropogenic pressure due to the development of settlements, resulting in a significant proportion of initial soils. The soils there are mainly anthrosols, formed from till. They are contaminated with heavy metals (lead, cadmium, and zinc), which originate from industrial pollution and coal combustion. A significant area of soil in Dąb belongs to soil quality Class III. Class IV includes small patches near Henryk Kalemba Square and along the border with Osiedle Tysiąclecia.

=== Terrain ===
In terms of topography, the northern part of Dąb is located in the Chorzów Hills, which consist of undulating ranges of rounded or flattened terrain that reach up to 290 meters above sea level in the northern part of the district. The slopes of the Chorzów Hills stretch along Agnieszki Street and along Dębowa and Złota streets to the Rawa river valley. The area is cut by valley depressions (Dębowa Street runs along one of them).

The highest point of Dąb, reaching 295 meters above sea level, is located at the northern edge of the district, at the intersection of Agnieszki Street with Bytkowska and J. Mikusiński streets. From there, the terrain slopes downward toward the south. The southern part is situated in the Rawa Depression; its elevation at the border of Dąb, Osiedle Tysiąclecia, and Załęże is 265 m above sea level. The difference in elevation between the highest and lowest points in Dąb is therefore approximately 30 metres.

=== Climate ===
The climatic conditions in Dąb differ only slightly from those of Katowice as a whole. They are influenced by both climatic and local factors, as well as by human activity (e.g. the urban heat island effect). The district's climate is largely influenced by oceanic factors, which predominate over continental ones, as well as by tropical air masses that occasionally reach the area from the southwest through the Moravian Gate. The average annual temperature at the station in nearby Muchowiec for the 1961–2005 period was 8.1 °C. The warmest month is July (17.8 °C), and the coldest is January (–2.2 °C). The average annual sunshine duration for the 1966–2005 period was 1,474 hours. The average annual precipitation for the 1951–2005 period was 713.8 mm. The average duration of snow cover is 60–70 days, and the growing season lasts an average of 200–220 days. Western and southwesterly winds prevail throughout the year, while northerly winds are the least common. The average wind speed is 2.4 m/s.

=== Hydrography and hydrogeology ===
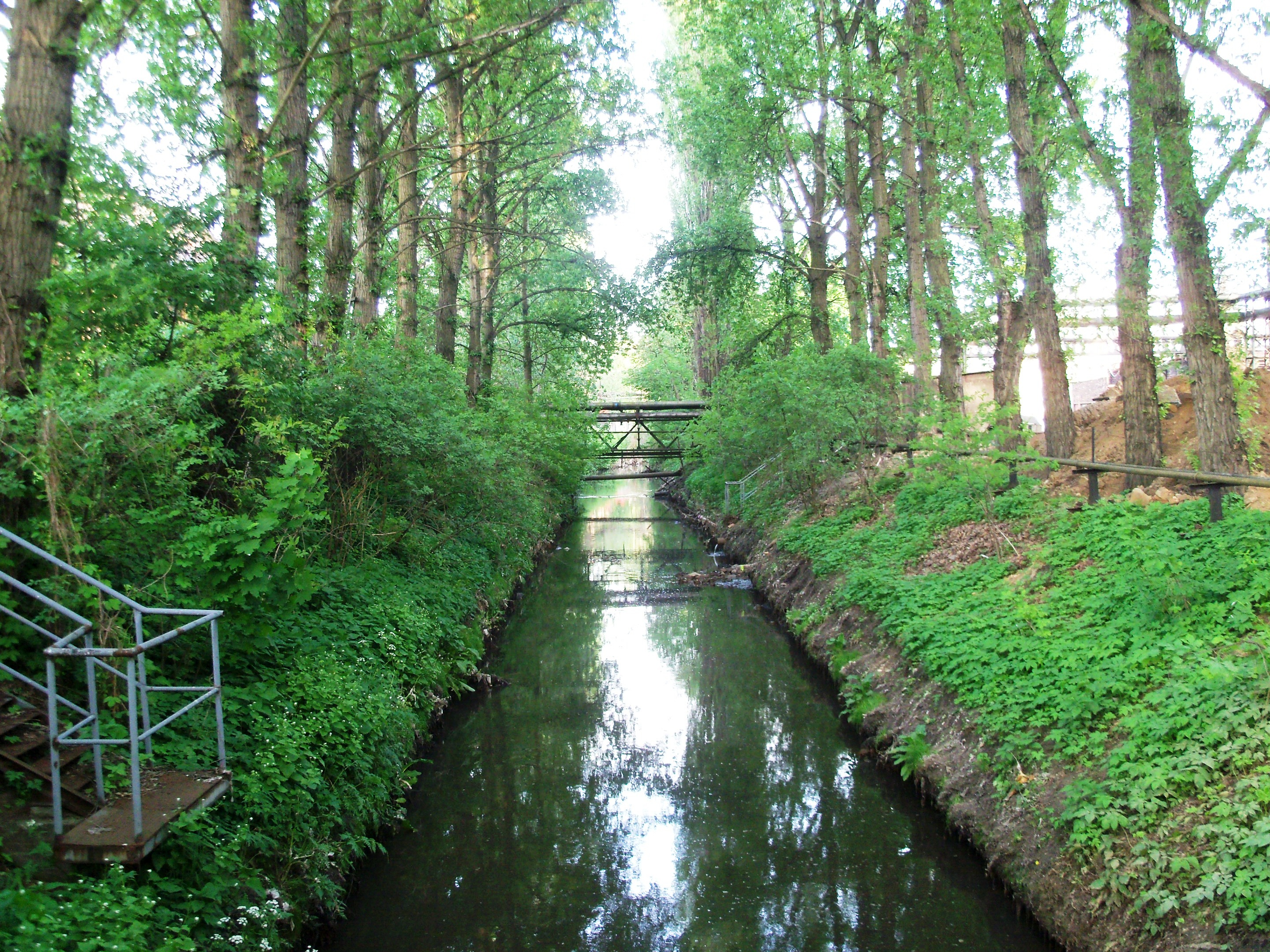
Rawa river near the former Baildon Steelworks (2011)

Dąb is located entirely within the left bank of the Vistula drainage basin, in the basin of the Rawa river, a tributary of the Brynica, which flows from west to east within the district along the southern border with Załęże; its entire course is regulated and it is embanked. It serves as a receiving body for treated and untreated wastewater as well as stormwater. Between 1992 and 2002, the proportion of external water (municipal and industrial wastewater) was approximately 70%, which caused significant disruption to the natural flow. The groundwater level in the river valley is low, although its depths within the district can vary significantly due to the diversity of the subsoil, the canalization of Dąb, and the sealing of the Rawa riverbed.

There are no bodies of water in Dąb, whereas as early as the 16th century, there were a number of dammed ponds in Rawa that served forges, were used as fish ponds, and were also intended to prevent flooding. The former Załęże Pond, located in the southeastern part of Dąb, was created as early as the late 15th century.

Dąb is located within the Silesian-Kraków hydrogeological region. Aquifers are present there in all stratigraphic layers, but their significance depends on geological and hydrogeological factors, as well as human influence. Larger complexes are found in the Rawa and Kłodnica valleys. The district is located within the Main Groundwater Reservoir No. 329 Bytom, which is of karst-fissured character, but it does not contain exploitable resources within Dąb.

=== Nature and environmental protection ===
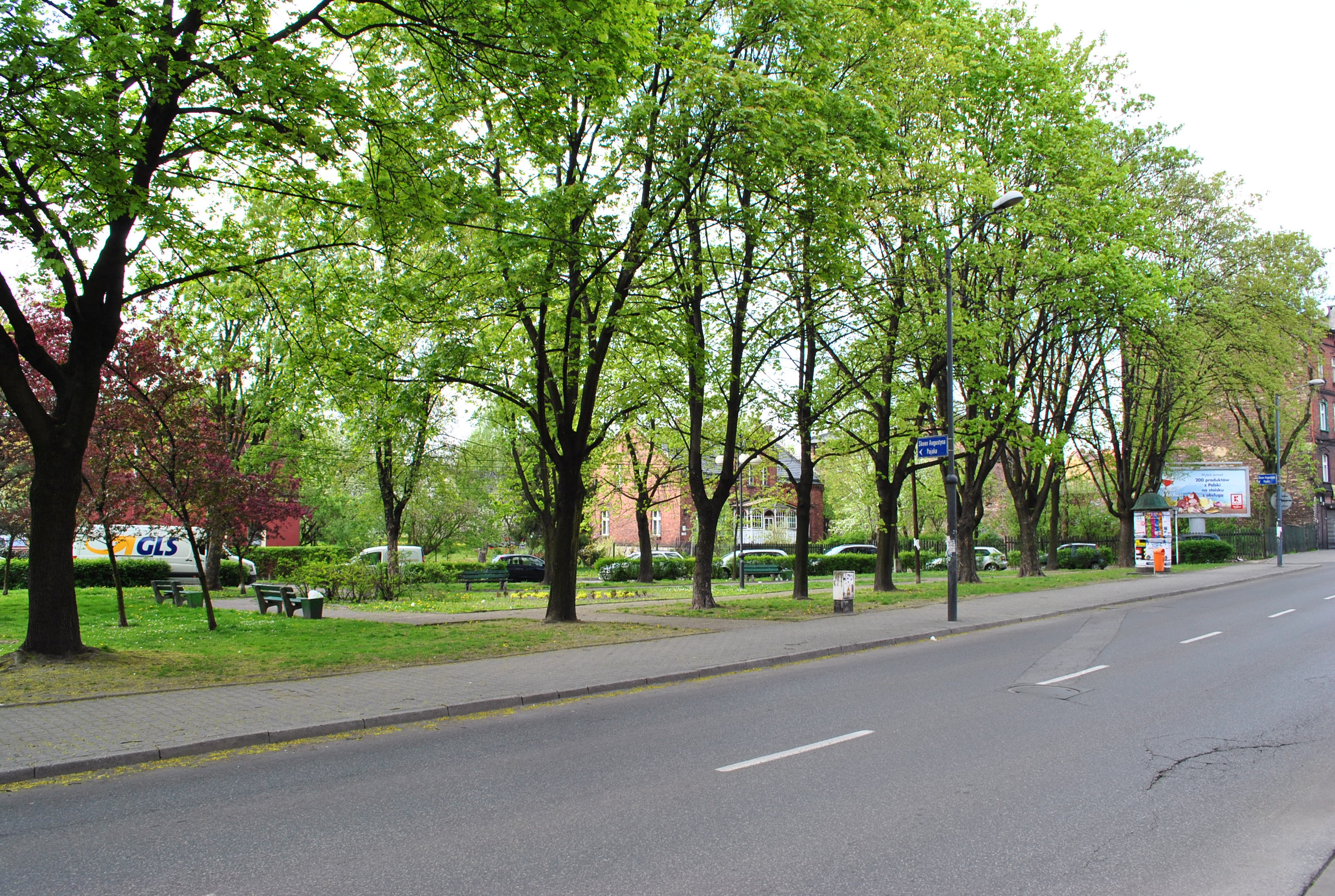
Augustyn Pająk Square viewed from Dębowa Street (2015)

In pre-industrial times, vast forest complexes stretched across Dąb, especially to the north and west. Norway spruce stands dominated the area, though deciduous trees were also present. These forests were home to various animal species, particularly roe deers, red deers, foxes, and wild boars. In terms of potential vegetation, the higher elevations of Dąb would be covered by subcontinental oak-linden-hornbeam riparian forests, while the Rawa river valley would have lowland alder and ash-alder riparian forests of water-soil habitats. In later years, as a result of the district's industrialization and urbanization, the proportion of green spaces decreased. In its western part, Dąb borders a vast park complex, the Silesian Park. The residential part is home to synanthropic animal species such as the rock dove, house sparrow, collared dove, swift, jackdaw, magpie, and blackbird. Human activity has had a significant impact on the plant species composition, resulting in the presence of synanthropic and ruderal vegetation.

The following landscaped green spaces and parks are located in the district:

- Henryk Kalemba Square (intersection of Chorzowska and Dębowa streets);
- Franciszek Macherski Square (Dębowa Street);
- Augustyn Pająk Square (intersection of Wiejska and Dębowa streets).

== History ==
=== Origins and the period to the 18th century ===
The first mention of Dąb appears in a document from 19 March 1299, issued by Duke Casimir of Bytom, transferring the villages of Chorzów and Krasny Dąb (Chorzow et Crasni Damb) to the Canons Regular of the Holy Sepulchre in Miechów as an endowment for the maintenance of the monastery and the Hospital of the Holy Spirit in Bytom. The earlier existence of Dąb might be suggested by a document from Pope Innocent II of 1136, confirming the jurisdiction of the Archbishop of Gniezno over Chorzów and the surrounding estates, as well as a document by Vladislaus I of Opole of 1257 mentioning, among other things, the reconstruction of Chorzów and Białobrzezie, which had been destroyed by a Tatar raid, by the Canons Regular of the Holy Sepulchre. Białobrzezie is likely the original name of Dąb.

Dąb is also mentioned by Jan Długosz in Liber beneficiorum dioecesis Cracoviensis, published in 1480. According to him, Duke Casimir of Bytom donated the village of Dąb to the Canons Regular of the Holy Sepulchre in 1299 as a contribution to the Hospital of the Holy Spirit in Bytom. The Bishop of Kraków, Jan Muskata, accepted Duke Casimir's decision and referred to the village as Dąb in his documents.

From the 13th to the 19th century, Dąb, along with Chorzów, was owned by the Canons Regular of the Holy Sepulchre in Miechów. On behalf of the monastery, both villages were administered by the parson of Parish of St. Mary Magdalene in Chorzów. After the secularization of the order and the administrative reform in the Prussian state in 1810, Dąb became an independent gmina.

The residents of Dąb were Roman Catholic, and the nearest churches were located in Bogucice, Michałkowice, and Chorzów; consequently, as the population grew, the need arose to build a church of their own. Construction of the first temple in Dąb began in 1873. The first, wooden church was dedicated on 28 February 1875 by Father Leopold Markiefka of Bogucice. A significant population increase, as well as the establishment of the church, led to the separation of Dąb from the Chorzów parish and the creation of the Parish of Saints John and Paul on 11 August 1894, with the village of Józefowiec also incorporated into the parish. Construction of the current church, designed by architect Ludwig Schneider, began in 1901. The Bishop of Wrocław, Cardinal Georg Kopp, dedicated it on 15 October 1902.

In the early days of the village, agriculture was the dominant economic activity. Since the Middle Ages, rye and oats were the main crops, and from the 18th century onward, barley, peas, buckwheat, and millet were also grown. Potato farming became widespread in Dąb during the 19th century. Thanks to local deposits of clay and sand, sand pits and brick kilns were also active there. Dąb was likely the site of the first ore and coal mining center in present-day Katowice. Iron ore was also mined there and processed in Kuźnica Bogucka. The relatively poor deposits were already exhausted by the second half of the 16th century. Nearly two hundred years later, shafts began to be dug in Dąb, this time intended for the extraction of coal. In 1787, the Fürstin Hedwig Coal Mine was established, ownership of which was granted to the parson of Chorzów, Ludwik Bojarski. Mining ceased in 1790, but as early as 1805, a new mine, Neue Hedwig, was established, which extracted higher-quality coal through 13 shafts ranging in depth from 10 to 30 meters. It was also owned by the Chorzów parish.

=== 19th century and early 20th century ===
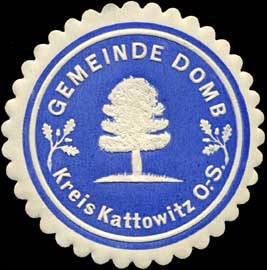
Pre-war seal of the former Gmina Dąb

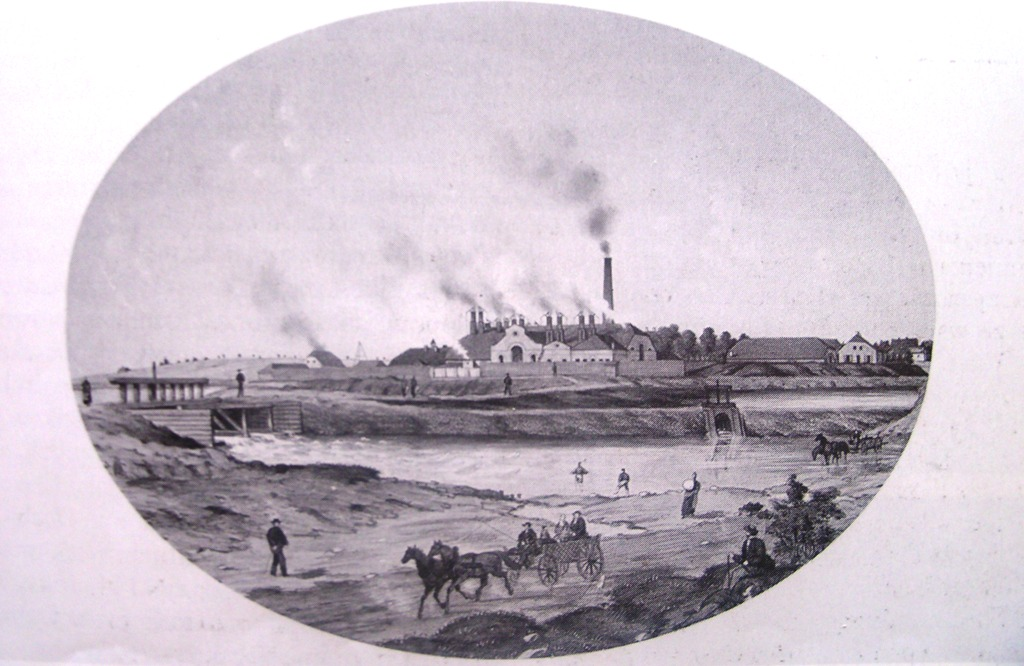
John Baildon's puddling ironworks in a mid-19th century lithograph (later the Baildon Steelworks)

In the first half of the 19th century, the metallurgical industry also developed in Dąb. The Friden Zinc Smelter was established, and in 1823, the puddling ironworks of John Baildon. The growth of the metallurgical industry led to an increase in demand for coal. In 1838, a new Waterloo Coal Mine was established in Dąb, owned by John Baildon and the Canons Regular of the Holy Sepulchre monastery in Miechowice. In 1826, two settlements were erected on the grounds of the Dąb monastic demesne – Józefowiec and Bederowiec – founded by the parson of Chorzów, Father Józef Beder. Dąb, as monastery property, was taken over by the Prussian state in 1840 (as part of an administrative reform), and five years later, the village, the Fürstin Hedwig and Neue Hedwig mines, and half of the Waterloo Coal Mine were transferred to the Hospital of the Holy Spirit in Bytom, which had been a co-owner of the village since 1299.

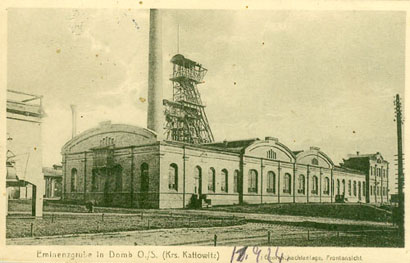
Eminencja Coal Mine in 1915

After John Baildon's death, his shares passed into other hands – ultimately, the Waterloo Coal Mine became the property of Fritz von Friedlaender-Fuld, and the puddling plant was acquired by the Obereisen company in 1887.

From in the second half of the 19th century, Dąb transformed from a village into an industrial settlement. In the 1840s, it had 52 houses, a folwark, a school, two mills, and two inns. The Agnes Zinc Smelter, the Baildon Steelworks, and the Arthur and Waterloo coal mines operated there. In 1907, the Eminencja Coal Mine began production, owned by the Hospital of the Holy Spirit, the parish in Chorzów, and the Baildon Steelworks.

In 1828, the first school in Dąb was established in a rented cottage, and 30 years later, it received its own building. Until 1847, classes were taught only in Polish, and it remained the language of instruction until 1872. By the late 19th century, Dąb had become an important center of Polish cultural life. Active organizations there included: the Christian Workers' Union (1882–1885), which staged numerous theatrical productions, the Society of St. Aloysius (from 1892), which also organized theatrical performances, the Echo (from 1896), the Catholic Workers' Society, and the Youth Social Club. In the 1880s, the Polish Reading Room also began operating there.

=== Interwar period ===
After the capitulation of Germany and the end of World War I in 1918, an independent Poland was established, and with it, the question of Upper Silesia's future was revived. The residents of Dąb actively participated in the three Silesian Uprisings. During the plebiscite in Upper Silesia on 20 March 1921, 54% of eligible inhabitants of Gmina Dąb voted in favor of joining Poland. During the Third Silesian Uprising, insurgent units concentrated in Dąb launched an attack on Katowice on 3 May 1921. Along with part of Upper Silesia, it became part of the borders of the reborn Poland. On 20 June 1922, the Polish authorities formally took over Dąb, which until October 1924 was a rural gmina comprising the villages of Józefowiec and Bederowiec, as well as the settlements of Kolonia Agnieszki and Sośnina. After Dąb was incorporated into Katowice on 15 October 1924, the separated village of Józefowiec became part of the municipality of Gmina Wełnowiec. After 1918, social and cultural life in Dąb flourished – the Society of Polish Women and the St. Hyacinth Educational Society began their activities, as did a branch of the Sokół Gymnastic Society and the Dąb Katowice sports club.

=== World War II ===
On the eve of the outbreak of World War II, in August 1939, a self-defense unit was organized in Dąb, co-organized by, among others, an officer of the Silesian Voivodeship Police, Jan Górski. On 15–16 August, he helped lead an operation to dismantle a group of German conspirators.

On 2 September 1939, German forces entered Dąb. The following day, major clashes with the Germans took place along the route from Katowice to Chorzów, where Lieutenant Franciszek Kruczek's patrol fought against a Freikorps Ebbinghaus unit commanded by Ewald Wutzen. The final fighting in the Katowice area lasted until 7 September 1939. After occupying Dąb, the Germans began ethnic cleansing – all former Silesian insurgents were dismissed from the Eminencja Coal Mine, and a group of insurgents was executed at the Baildon Steelworks. Many residents of the district and those connected to it perished in the death camps, including Father Karol Żmij, Father Józef Kania, Father Franciszek Macherski, Jan Oleś, and Józef Walus. Between 1941 and 1945, several labor camps operated on the grounds of the Baildon Steelworks. In early 1945, the Red Army launched an offensive in Dąb. In January of that year, Soviet bombers carried out air raids that damaged several buildings.

=== Post-war years ===
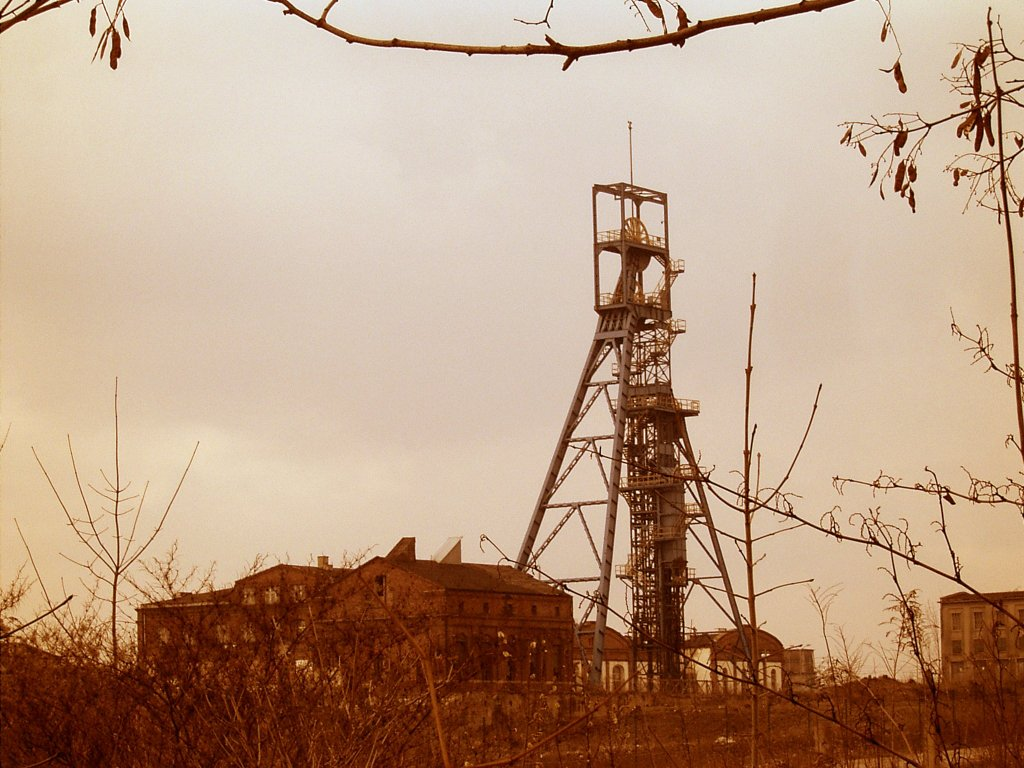
Buildings of the former Gottwald Coal Mine before the construction of the Silesia City Center in 2005

After World War II, operations resumed at the district's largest industrial facilities. Production at the Baildon Steelworks began again on 1 February 1945. Over the next few years, the steelworks underwent modernization, especially in the 1950s and 1960s. Mining at the Eminencja Coal Mine also resumed on 1 February 1945, and in March 1953, it was named after the late President of Czechoslovakia, Klement Gottwald. In the meantime, the Katowice mining field was incorporated into the mine. On 1 January 1974, it was merged with the Kleofas Coal Mine in Załęże. In 1955, the Gottwald Coal Mine opened a kindergarten and a community center on Krzyżowa Street, and in 1961, a swimming pool on Dębowa Street. In 1981, a clinic was opened at the corner of Żelazna and Chorzowska streets.

In the 1990s, the gradual liquidation of mining operations at the Kleofas Coal Mine began, which continued until 1994. On 18 November 2005, a new shopping center – Silesia City Center – opened on the site of the closed mine, and on 22 February 2007, construction began on the Dębowe Tarasy housing estate, which continued until March 2022.

== Demography ==
The population of Dąb has fluctuated significantly over time. Some of the earliest records regarding its population date back to 1598, when the village was home to 10 peasants, a smallholder, and two village headmen. In 1660, Dąb was home to 11 farmers, 9 smallholders, a miller, and an innkeeper. By 1763, there were already 10 cottagers with fields, 10 peasants, 6 smallholders, and a village headman. More precise data on the population date from the 18th century – in 1780, Dąb had 152 inhabitants, and in 1825, there were 423. A rapid increase in the population occurred at the turn of the 19th and 20th centuries, and with this, over the course of one century, the village transformed into a major industrial center. This was linked to the quickly developing industrial plants in the area, especially the start of mining operations at the Eminencja Coal Mine.

In 1988, 10,423 people lived in Dąb. At that time, the population was dominated by people aged 45–59. In the subsequent period, the population declined – in 1997, the district had approximately 9,800 residents, and the population density was 5,160 people per km². In 2007, Dąb was home to 7,694 people, and the population density was 4,141 people per km², more than twice that of the entire city of Katowice, which stood at 1,916 people per km². This period was characterized by a predominance of people aged 60 and older and a small proportion of people of pre-working age. Since then (as of 2015), there has been only a single period of population growth – in 2009, Dąb had 7,730 residents, and in 2010, there were 7,930. Since then, a further decline in the number of residents in the district has been recorded.

Sources: 1780 (according to another source, in 1783 Dąb had 250 inhabitants); 1825; 1845; 1862; 1867; 1871 (according to another source, 1,776 people); 1873; 1880; 1885; 1891; 1900; 1938; 1988; 1997; 2005; 2010; 2015; 2019.

== Politics and administration ==
Dąb was incorporated into Katowice in 1924, along with Bogucice, Brynów, Ligota, Załęże, and Zawodzie. At that time, the gmina covered an area of 4.06 km². During the interwar period, Dąb was assigned to District III Załęże-Dąb, while on 7 October 1954, the area was assigned to the Załęże-Śródmieście district.

On 1 January 1992, 22 auxiliary local government units were established in Katowice, including Dąb. A resolution of the Katowice City Council of 29 September 1997 maintains the existing structure of the auxiliary units. According to the charter of 29 April 2015, the legislative body of Dąb is a 15-member council, and the executive body is the board.

In elections to the Katowice City Council, Dąb belongs to constituency No. 4 (Osiedle Tysiąclecia, Dąb, Załęże, Osiedle Witosa, Załęska Hałda-Brynów). Between 2010 and 2014, it had six representatives on the City Council.

== Economy ==
Significant economic changes took place in Dąb after 1989, including the closures of two major industrial facilities: the Baildon Steelworks and the Gottwald Coal Mine (Kleofas). Coal extraction continued at the mine until 1994. The Baildon Steelworks declared bankruptcy in mid-2001, leading to the redevelopment of the former site. Companies related to the metallurgical industry began operating there, and new facilities, including commercial and service-oriented ones, were established. The zoning plan adopted on 27 July 2016, covering the central part of Załęże and the site of the former Baildon Steelworks, allowed for the establishment of non-industrial activities.

The site of the former Baildon Steelworks is now home to the following metallurgical industry facilities:

- ITALMEC, a manufacturer of production lines, machinery, and equipment for welding wire drawing;
- ESAB, a manufacturer of welding and cutting equipment and materials;
- BGH, a manufacturer of alloy steel and nickel alloys.

In addition, several office and industrial-technology complexes have been built there, including the Chorzowska 108 Office Center, the Industrial-Technology Revita Park (a complex of revitalized buildings adapted for office and service, training and conference, logistics and production, and scientific and research functions), Silesia Business Park (a complex of four office buildings constructed between 2013 and 2018, designed by architects Przemo Łukasik and Łukasz Zagała from the Medusa Group studio), as well as a number of smaller businesses. At the corner of Chorzowska and F. W. Grundmann streets, on the site of the former Baildon Hall, there is also the Face2Face Business Campus, consisting of two buildings (including a 14-story tower block) with an area of approximately 46,000 m²; its construction began in May 2018. Behind the Silesia Business Park complex is a Leroy Merlin DIY store, which opened on 13 June 2019.

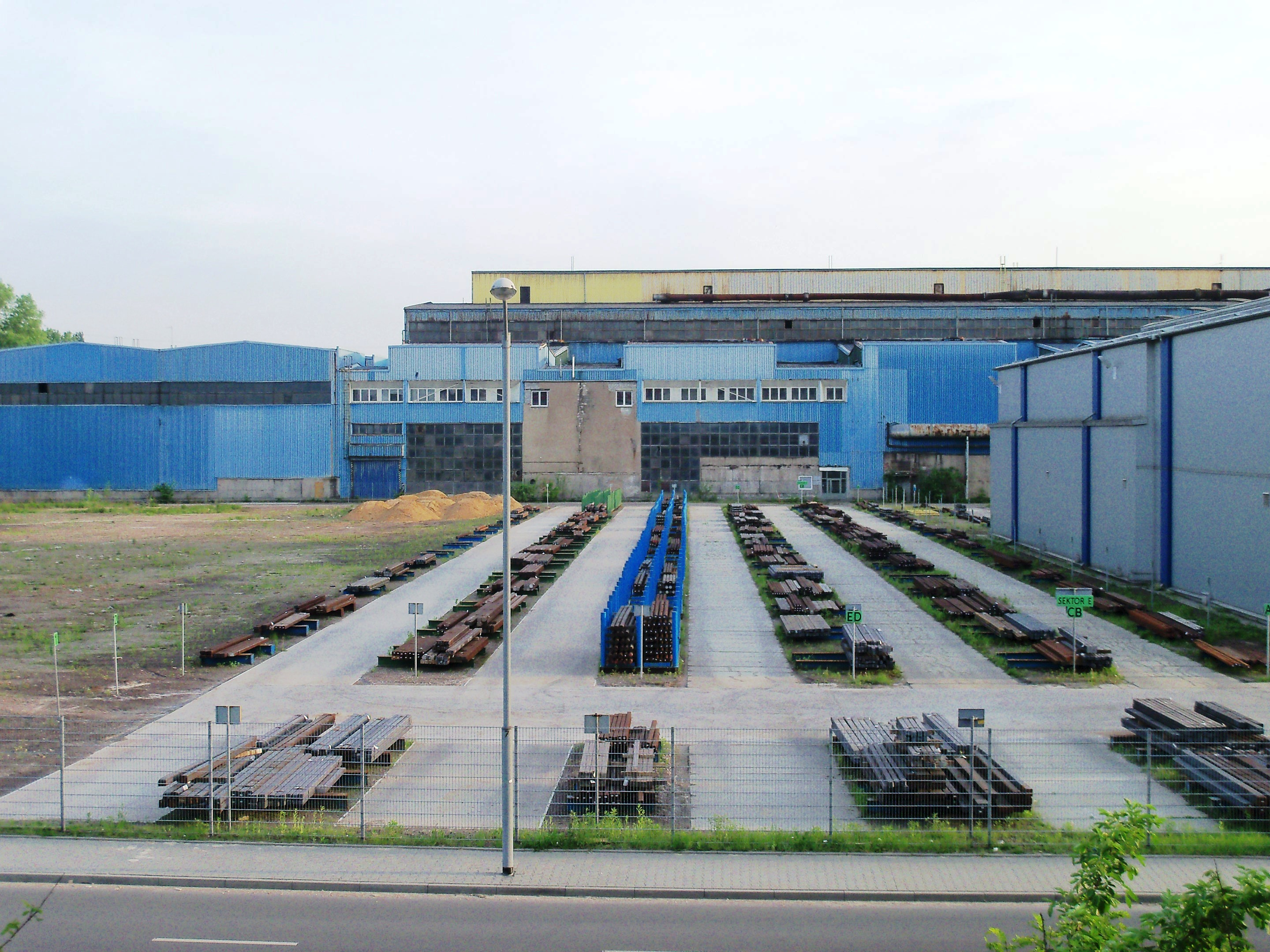
Industrial halls of ESAB on the former Baildon Steelworks site

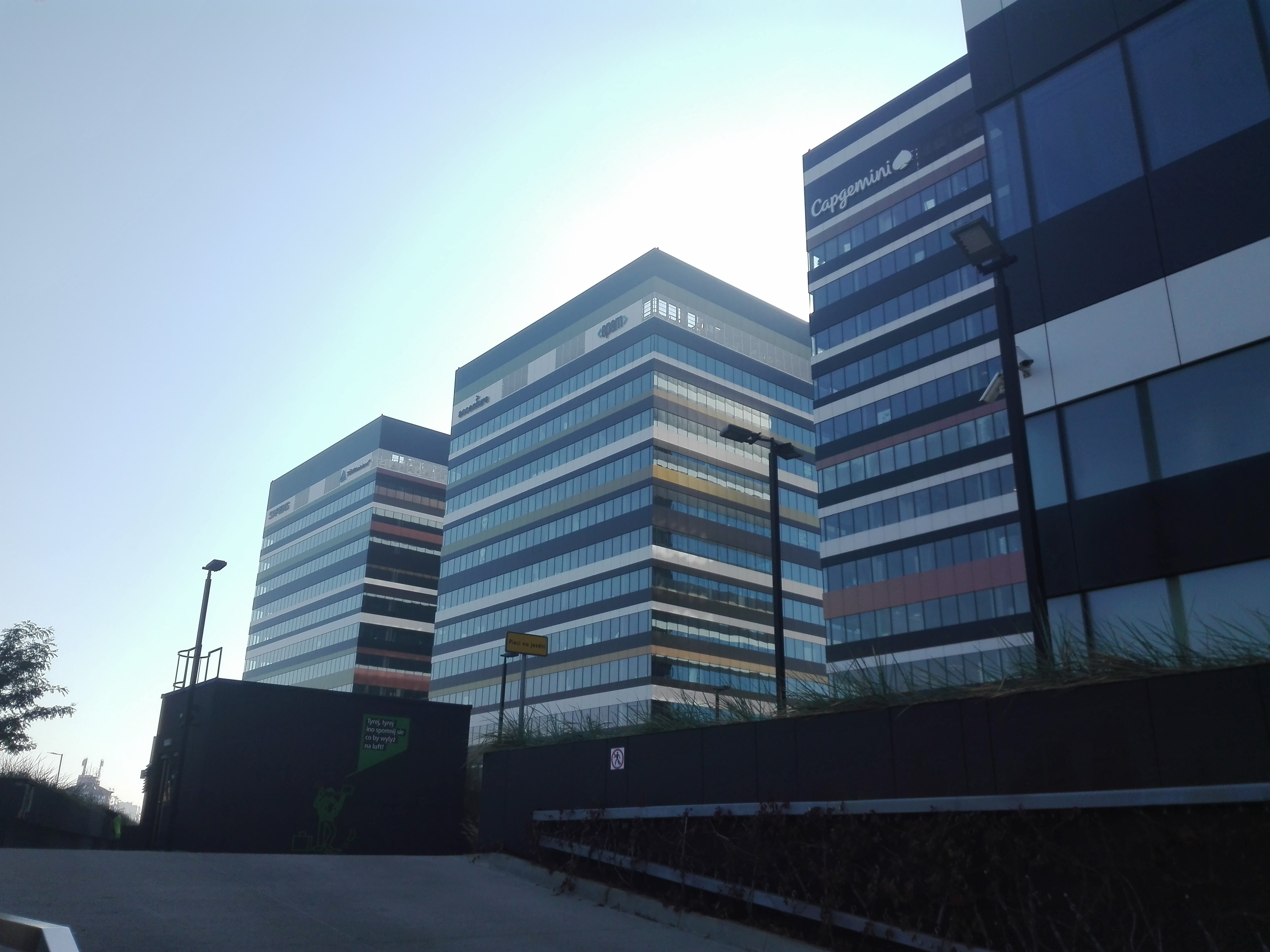
Silesia Business Park office buildings

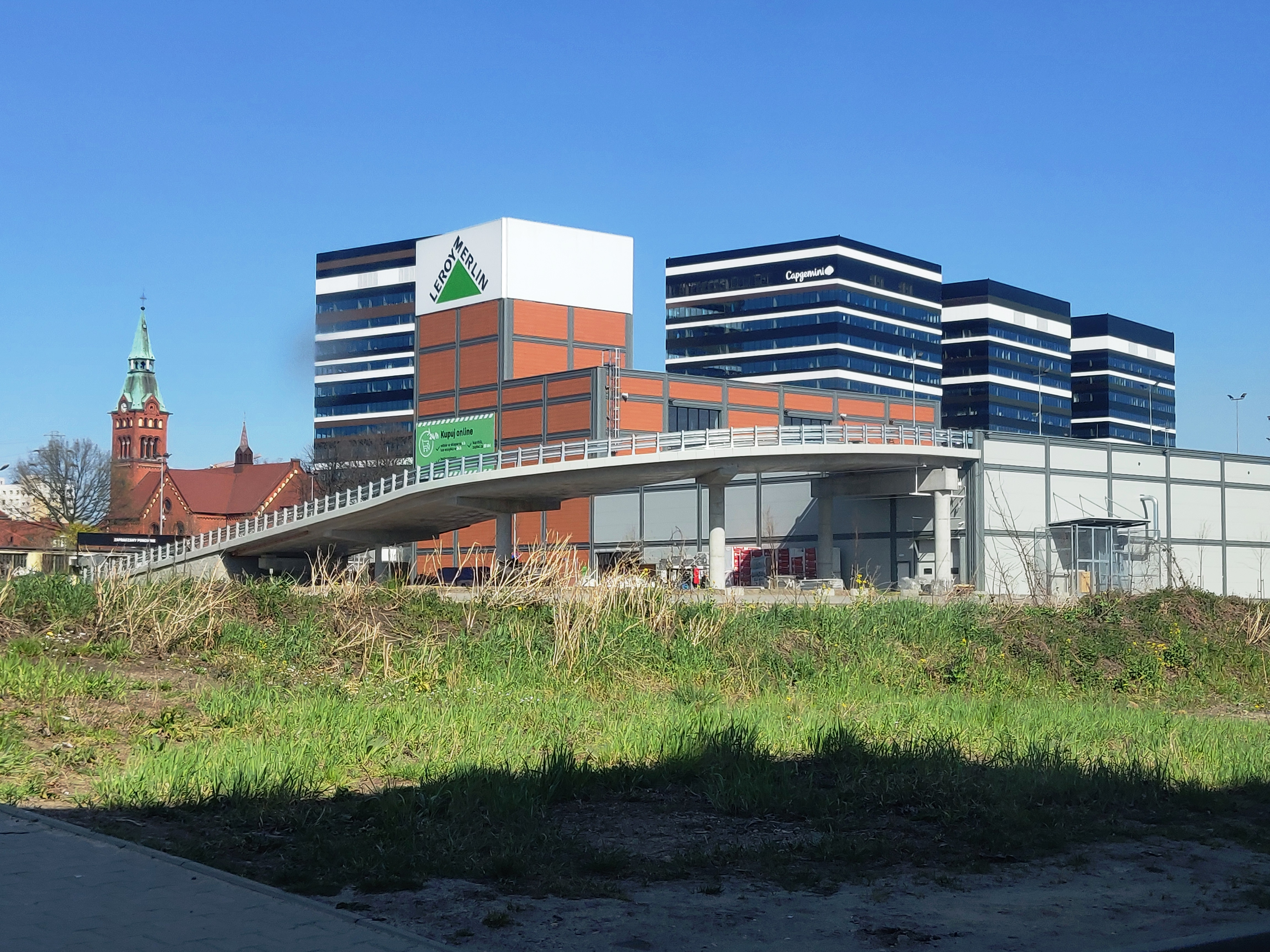
Leroy Merlin store

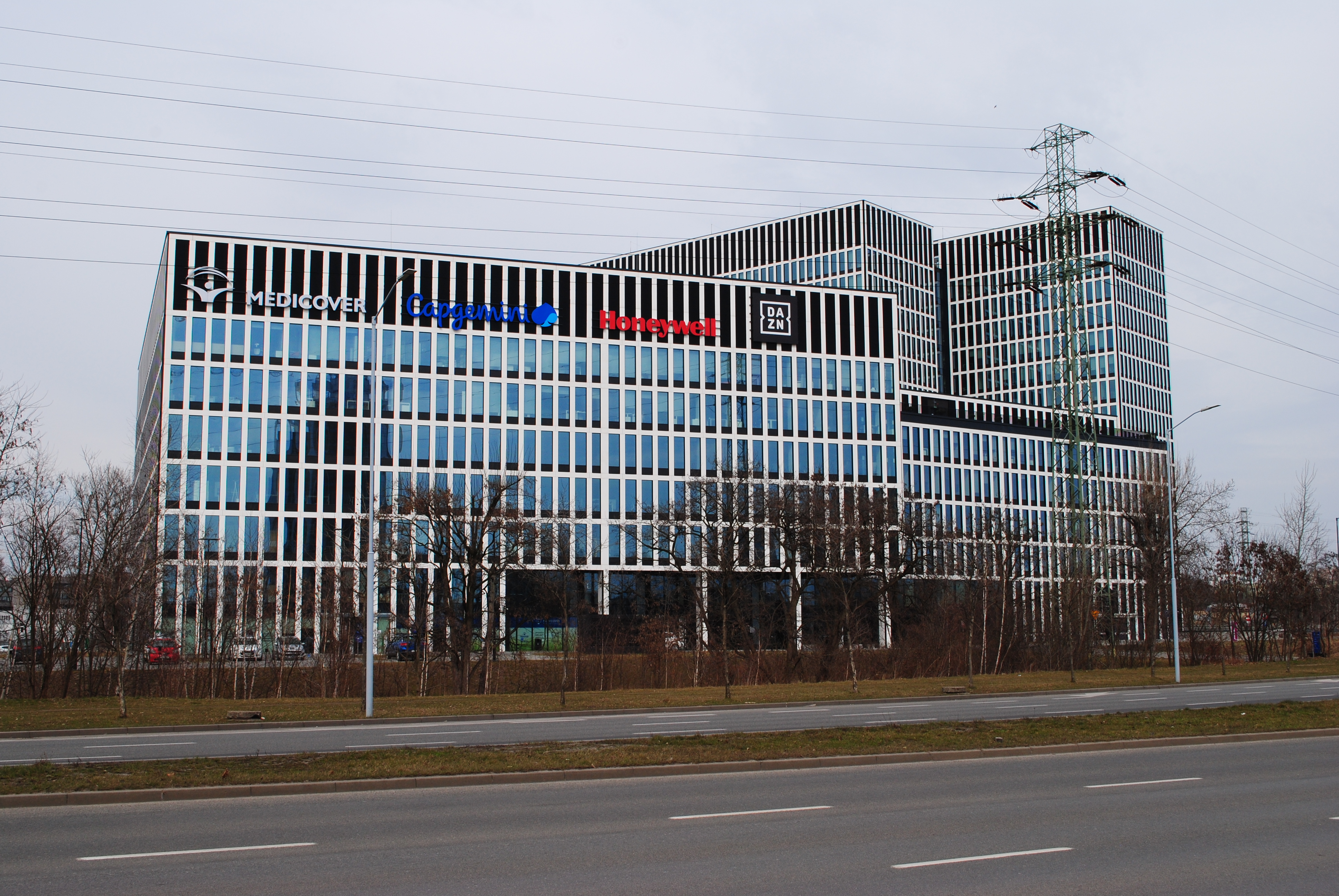
Face2Face Business Campus

The site of the former Gottwald Coal Mine, along with the surrounding plots along the northern section of Chorzowska Street, is another area that has undergone revitalization. It is also a hub for commercial and service activities. One of the largest shopping malls in Metropolis GZM – Silesia City Center – was built directly on the former mine site. It opened in November 2005 and was expanded between 2010 and 2011. It houses over 300 stores across an area of 86,000 m². To the east of it, the Katowice Business Point office and conference building was completed in 2010 at 3 Piotr Ściegienny Street, with an area of 16,200 m². The building houses, among others, the Tauron Polska Energia company. To the west of the mall, the Carbon Office building is located at 9 Węglowa Street (built from 2019 to December 2020; 8,450 m² of office space).

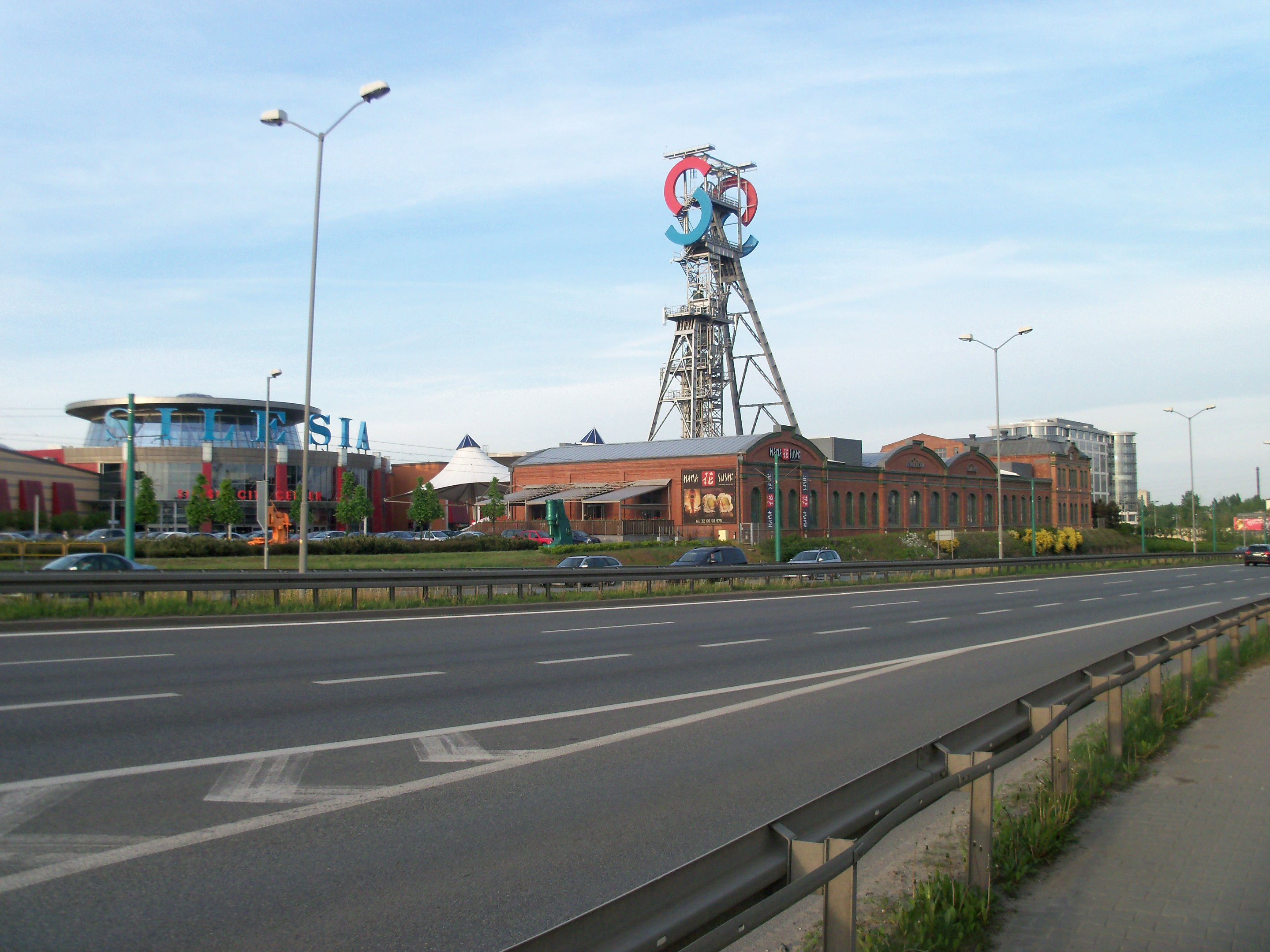
Silesia City Center

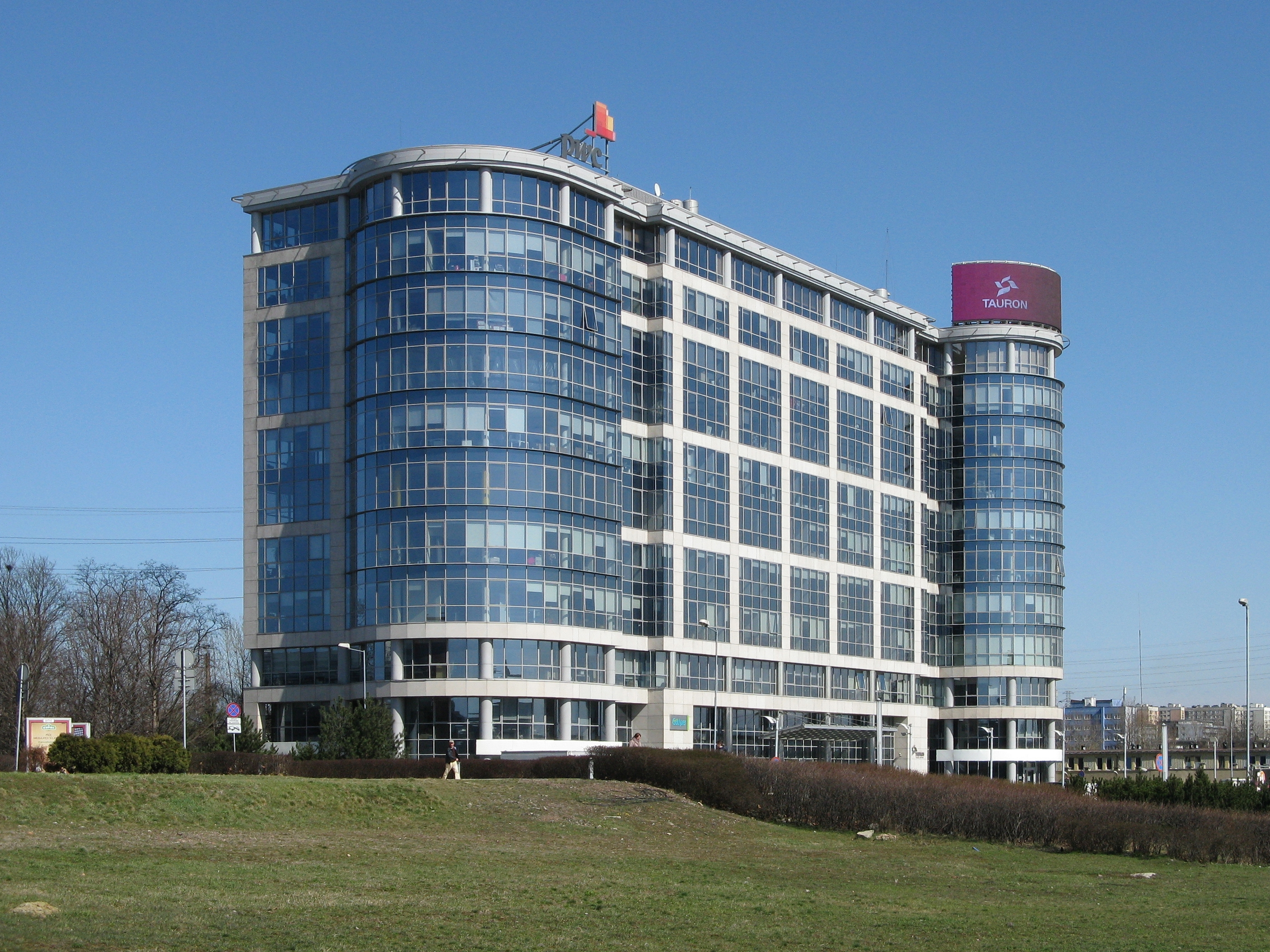
Katowice Business Point office building

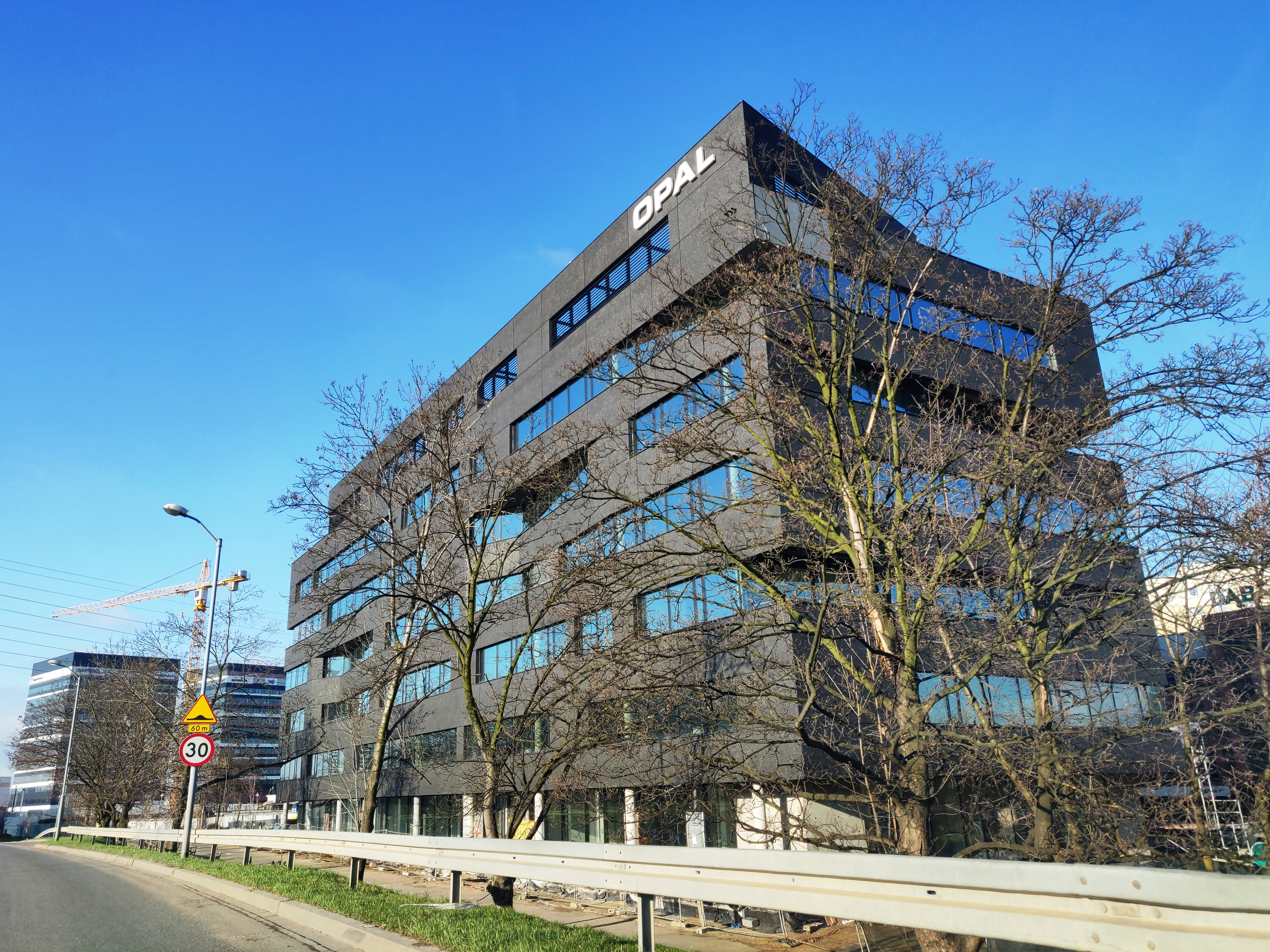
Carbon Office building (2021)

Two local commercial and service centers have developed in Dąb. The first is Dębowa Street, between Chorzowska and Sportowa streets. Businesses are located along the main street there, which has rural origins. The second is the area on the border between Dąb and Wełnowiec-Józefowiec, near the intersection of Szczecińska, Krzyżowa, T. Kotlarz, and P. Ściegienny streets, as well as of Agnieszki, Krzyżowa, Dębowa, and Bukowa streets. The largest retail facility in the district is Silesia City Center. There is also a municipal market located on Agnieszki Street, managed by the Municipal Market Authority in Katowice.

== Transport ==
=== Road transport ===
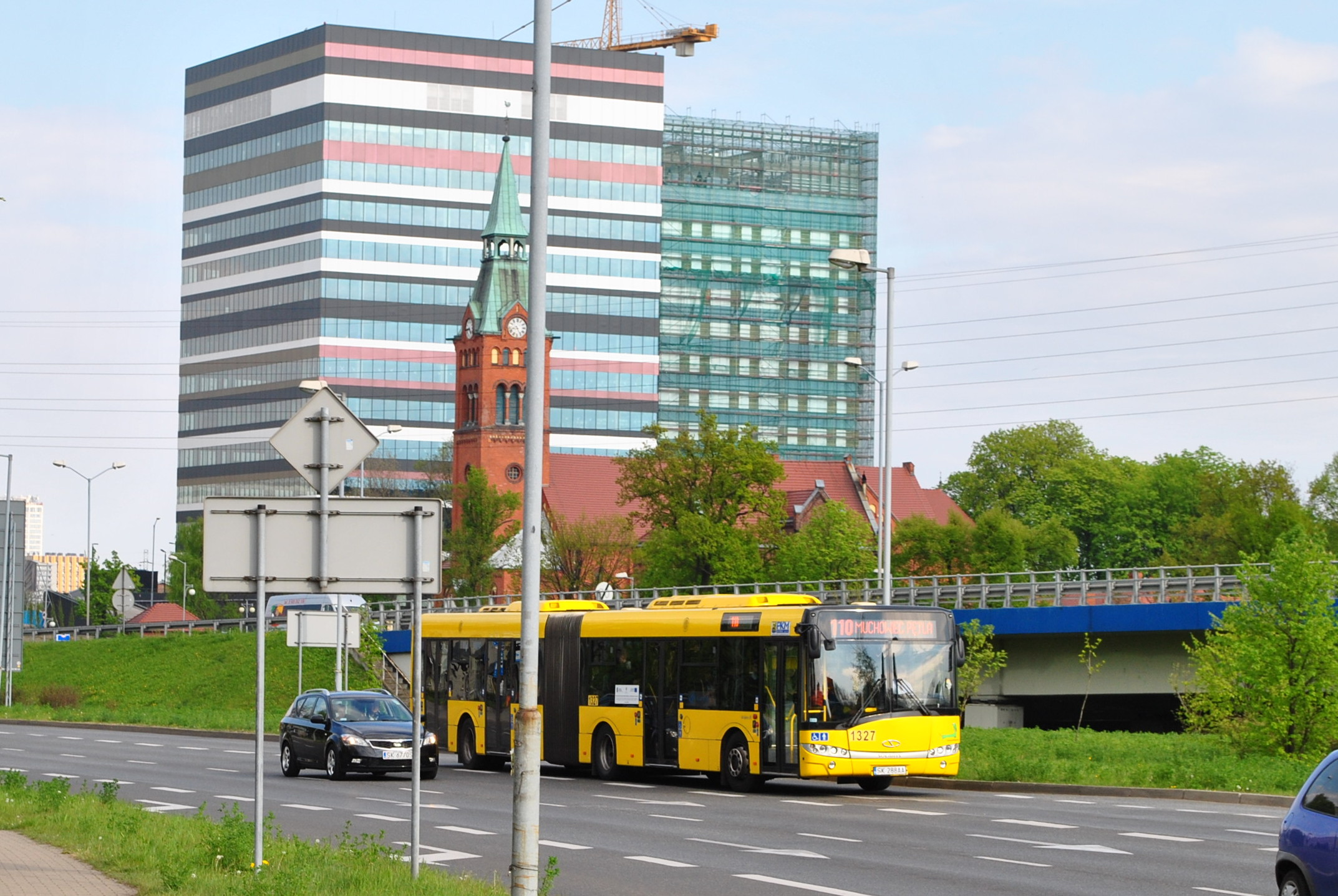
Solaris Urbino operating on behalf of the Metropolitan Transport Authority on Chorzowska Street; in the background, Silesia Business Park and the Church of Saints John and Paul (2015)

The main thoroughfares of Dąb include roads that developed alongside the district's urban growth, especially Dębowa Street, where the oldest buildings are located. Other major internal thoroughfares include Agnieszki, John Baildon, Bracka, Krzyżowa, Piotr Ściegienny, and Złota streets.

Dąb is very well connected to the rest of the region. Two of the major roads in Metropolis GZM run through there – voivodeship road 902 (Drogowa Trasa Średnicowa; within Dąb, the Lviv Eagles Overpass) and national road 79 (Chorzowska Street). They connect with Bracka and Feliks Bocheński streets and continue south through Załęże to the A4 motorway at a major interchange. In terms of intra-city connections, Dąb has very good links to Śródmieście (along Chorzowska Street and Drogowa Trasa Średnicowa), as well as to neighboring districts and, along the main roads, to, among others, Bogucice, Koszutka, Giszowiec, and Szopienice-Burowiec.

=== Public transport ===
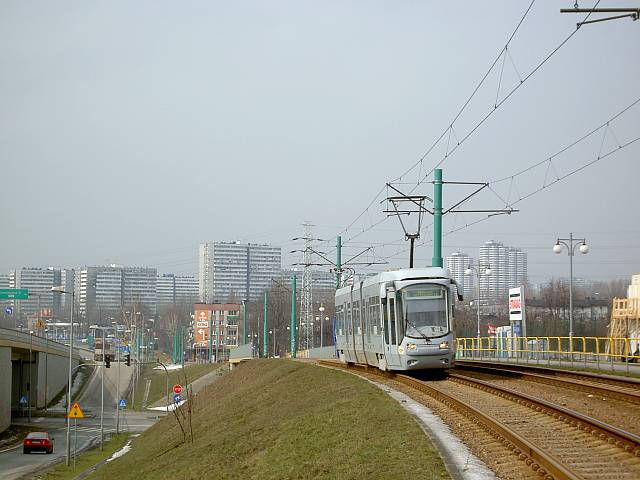
Alstom Citadis 100 tram near the stop at Silesia City Center (2005)

Public transportation in Dąb consists of buses and trams, operated on behalf of the Metropolitan Transport Authority. There is no rail network. As of August 2020, there are 7 stops in the district, 3 of which are combined tram and bus stops, and 4 are bus stops. Bus routes run along the district's main thoroughfares, while the tram line runs parallel to Chorzowska Street on a dedicated track. The main public transportation routes in Dąb are:

- Chorzowska Street; at the Dąb Kościół stop, 13 bus lines (6, 7, 7N, 23, 109, 110, 673, 674, 820, 830, 830N, 840, 840N) and 6 tram lines (0, 6, 11, 19, 23, and 33); this route is mainly intercity, with the main destinations being Śródmieście, Chorzów, Bytom, Tarnowskie Góry, and Gliwice;
- The Agnieszki–Krzyżowa–P. Ściegienny route; at the Dąb Krzyżowa stop, 4 bus lines (lines: 0, 50, 110, 193); mainly intra-city lines and to Siemianowice Śląskie.

The origins of the tram network in the district date back to the late 19th century. At that time, the Berlin-based company Kramer & Co. applied for a concession to build a narrow-gauge steam tram line along the route between Królewska Huta, Dąb, Katowice, Wełnowiec, and Huta Laura, which it was granted on 23 March 1896. In the same year, the section between Katowice (near the present-day Jerzy Ziętek Square), Wełnowiec, and Huta Laura was built, while two years later construction began on the tram line between Katowice (Market Square), Dąb, and Królewska Huta, which was completed in August and put into service on 25 November 1898. The route through Dąb remained narrow-gauge until 1940. At that time, a standard-gauge route was put into service on the section between the Market Square, Dąb, and Chorzów's Market Square.

=== Bicycle infrastructure ===
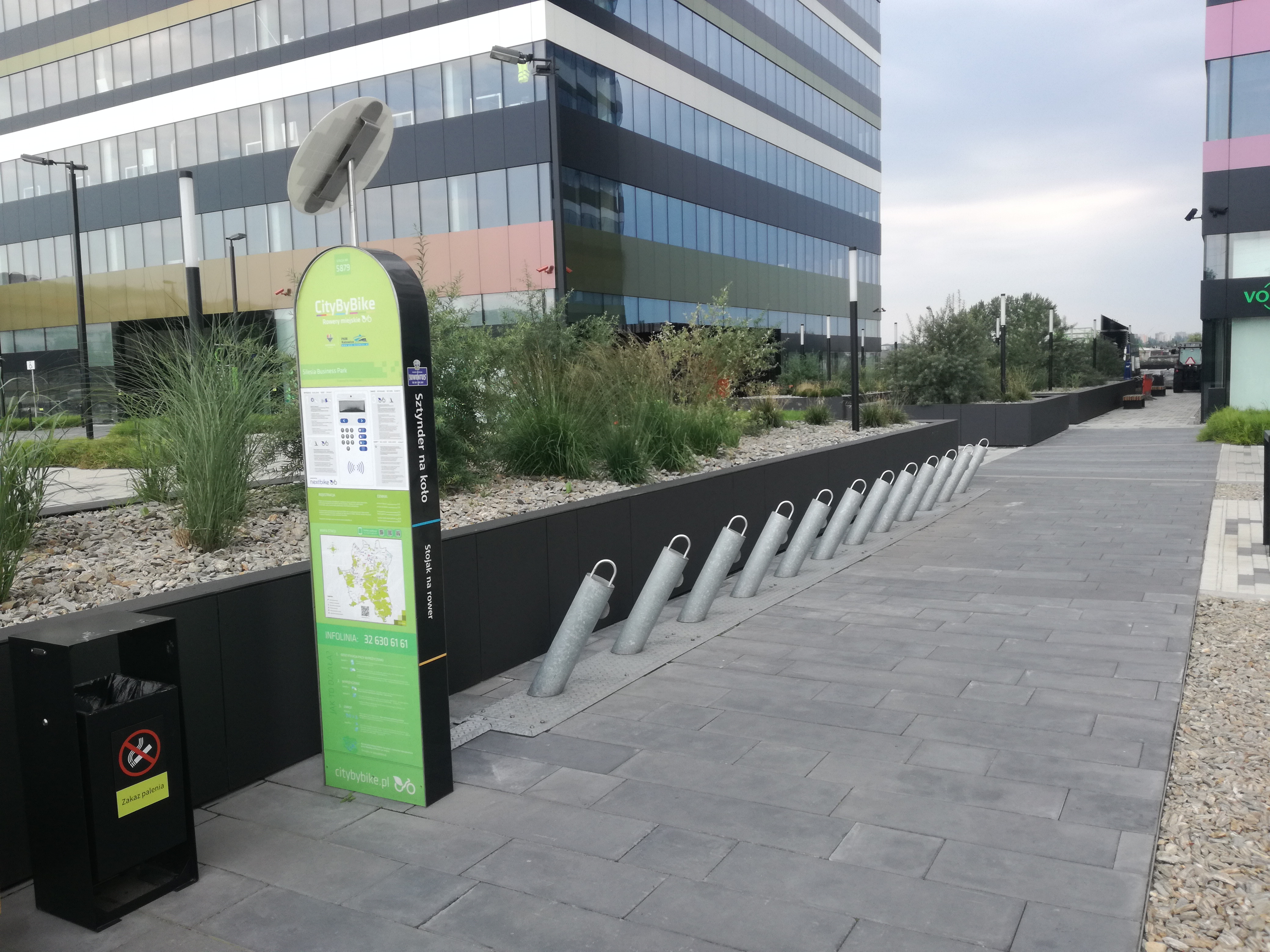
City by bike station No. 5879 at Silesia Business Park (2018)

Dąb has a network of bicycle paths located along the following streets:

- The northern part of Chorzowska Street, from J. N. Stęślicki Street to the intersection with Bracka Street; there is a free, unguarded bicycle parking lot near Silesia City Center;
- Bracka Street (eastern side);
- Bożogrobców Street (western and southern sides).

Dąb also has a municipal bike-sharing network – Metrorower – which replaced the City by bike system. The first two stations were put into service in 2019 as part of participatory budgeting projects. The cost of launching them was 105,000 złoty. As of March 2024, the following stations are in operation there: 27071 (P. Ściegienny Street), 27312 (Dębowa Street), 27314 (Żelazna Street), and 27706 (Chorzowska Street).

== Technical infrastructure ==
There are no drinking water intakes within the district – Dąb, like the rest of Katowice, relies on surface water intakes from the following reservoirs: Goczałkowice Lake on the Vistula, Czanieckie Lake on the Soła, and water intakes at Dziećkowice Lake, Maczki, and Kozłowa Góra. Water from the water treatment plant is distributed via main and distribution water mains. Main water mains, managed by the Upper Silesian Waterworks Company, run through Dąb. There are two lines there: one from the network reservoir in Murcki, which is supplied from the water treatment plants in Dziećkowice, Goczałkowice, and Kobiernice. In Dąb, it runs northward along Złota Street and heads toward Siemianowice Śląskie, to the Bytków district. The second main water pipeline runs from the Góra Wyzwolenia water reservoirs in Chorzów, parallel to Chorzowska Street, toward Śródmieście. The municipal water supply network in Dąb is managed by the Water Supply Network Operations Division – Center of the Katowice Waterworks company.

The sewer system is managed by the Sewer System Operations Division – Center of Katowice Waterworks and is located within the catchment area of the Gigablok Wastewater Treatment Plant (formerly Centrum-Gigablok), whose sewer catchment area lies within the Rawa basin. It was commissioned in 1983 and is located at 130 Obrońców Westerplatte Street. The technical condition of the sewer network in the Gigablok catchment area in 2004 (including in Dąb) was mostly satisfactory for combined sewers (49% of the network), but poor for sanitary sewers (40%).

Electricity is supplied to the residents of Dąb via a 110-kV high-voltage grid that runs along Chorzowska and Grundmann streets, to which the following power stations located within the district are connected: Baildon (on-site substation), Dąb, and Załęże. It is managed by the Tauron group.

== Architecture and urban planning ==
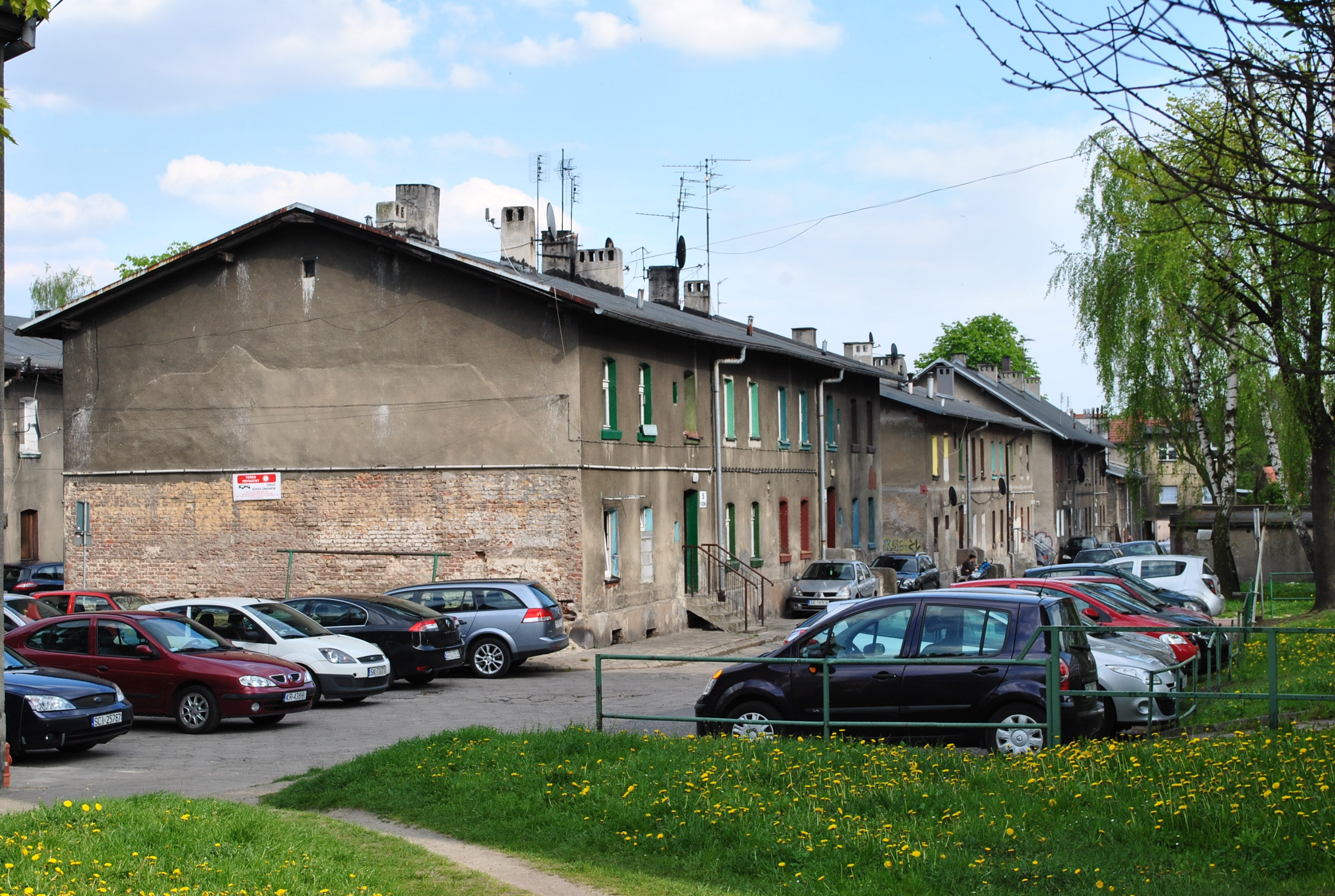
Former workers' colony on Studzienna Street, built in the 1860s (2015)

Dąb is characterized by significant architectural and urban diversity, which has developed mostly since the late 19th century. A large part of the district consists of residential buildings, constructed mainly in the late 19th and first half of the 20th centuries in the historicist and modern styles, as well as in the postwar years. Most of the historic buildings in Dąb are concentrated along Agnieszki, Dębowa (mainly tenements from the first half of the 20th century), Lipowa, and Złota streets, as well as in the areas around Cicha and Jasna streets (Osiedle Ducha). In the southern part of Dąb, on the sites of the former Baildon Steelworks and the closed Gottwald Coal Mine, industrial and service facilities have developed. Between them lie high-traffic transportation routes, namely Chorzowska Street and the tram line. Dąb has a significant proportion of developed land relative to the district's total area, which stood at 26% in 2007.

=== Urban development ===
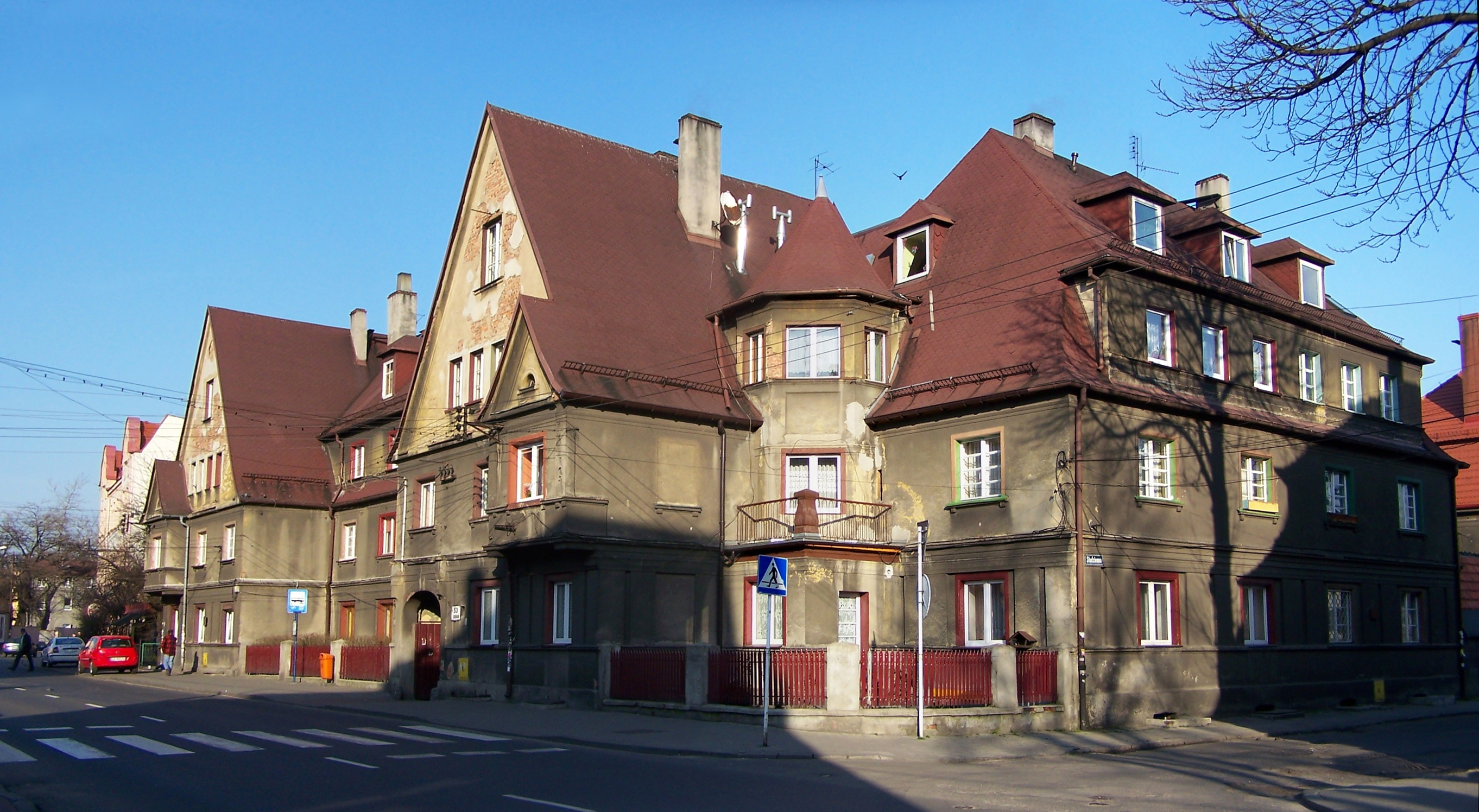
Buildings at the corner of Dębowa and Studzienna streets from the early 20th century

The urban layout of Dąb had already taken shape before the village was officially established. A road leading to Kraków, known as "Via magna", was designated within the territory of the district. From the direction of Załęże, it ran along the present-day Żelazna Street and continued along the current P. Ściegienny Street to Bytków. The route to Chorzów ran partly along Szpitalna Street. The oldest settlements in Dąb wawere concentrated on this street and along the present-day Wiejska Street. Buildings were also located in the area of the current intersection of Bracka and Chorzowska streets, near the former folwark. By the 17th century, the urban layout of Dąb was already largely established. The axis of the village's layout was an unnamed stream that flowed along Dębowa and Agnieszki streets. Today's Studzienna, Sportowa, Węglowa, and Źródlana streets were dirt roads at that time. On the western side of Dąb, between Lipowa and Szpitalna streets, there were farm buildings, and fields stretched perpendicular to the main road.

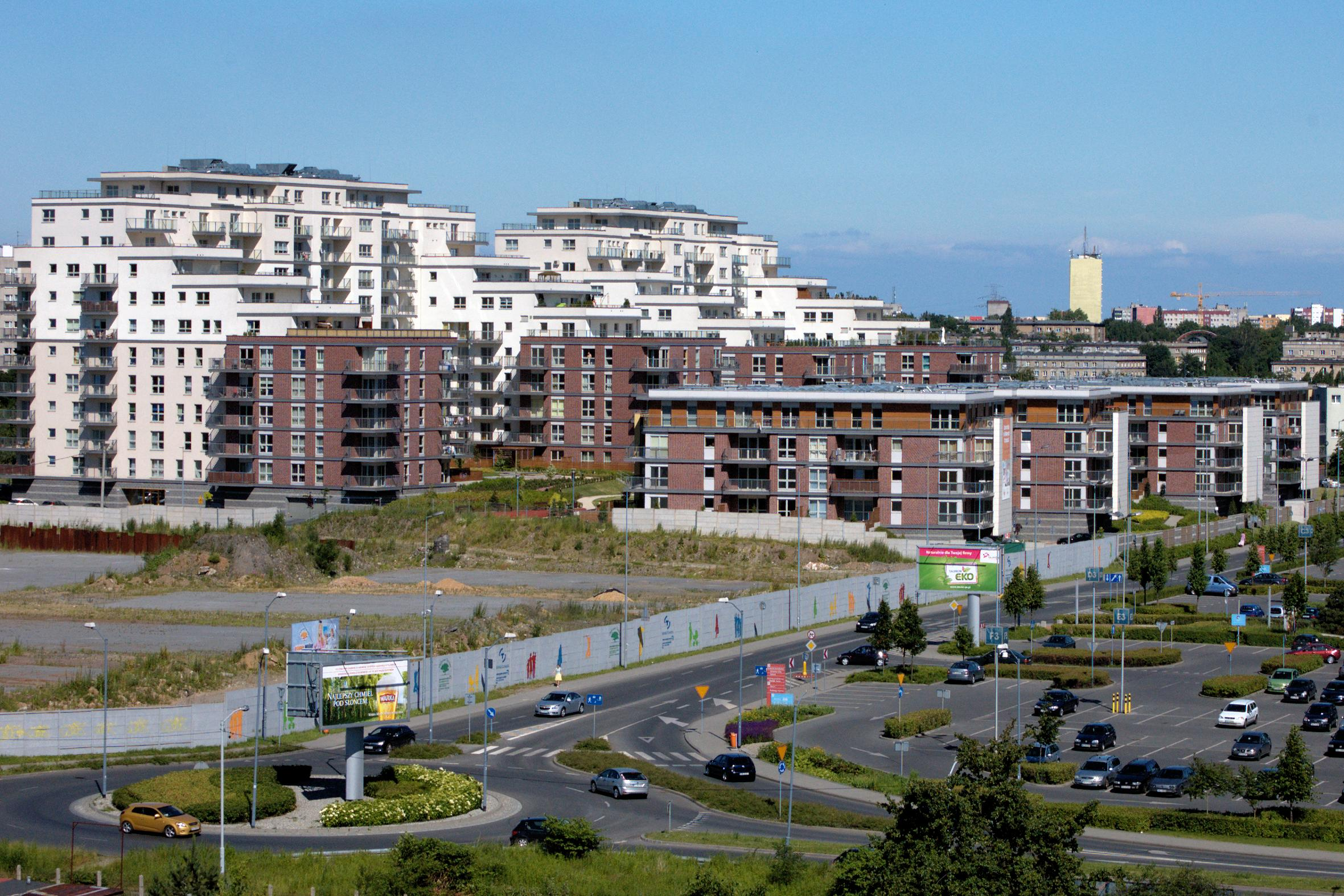
Dębowe Tarasy housing estate, built on land near the former Gottwald Coal Mine

In the early 19th century, the buildings in Dąb along Dębowa Street were wooden and thatched. At that time, the road between Bytom, Królewska Huta, and Katowice (now Chorzowska Street) was constructed, and in 1896, a tram line was opened running parallel to it. As industry developed, new housing for workers was built. In the 1860s, a neighborhood of single-story houses was erected on Studzienna Street, which remains one of the oldest building complexes in Dąb to this day. New tenements were built in the area of farm buildings. This development was particularly intense at the turn of the 19th and 20th centuries. During this time, the Baildon Steelworks was also expanded, as was the Eminencja Coal Mine (including the management office and the workers' hall). In 1900, a plan for the expansion of Dąb was drawn up. At that time, Bukowa and Złota streets were laid out parallel to Dębowa Street. New development continued to concentrate along it. Between 1901 and 1904, familoks were built at Lipowa and Krzyżowa streets, as well as Kolonia Agnieszki (now in Wełnowiec-Józefowiec).

Relatively few buildings were constructed during the interwar period compared to the prewar era, including those built in the 1920s at 6–8 Dębowa Street and on the present-day Bukowa Street. The main streets in the district were paved: Chorzowska, Dębowa, Agnieszki, Żelazna, and Lipowa. In the 1930s, construction began on the Holy Spirit Villa Estate on Błękitna and Widok streets.

In the postwar years, development in Dąb intensified significantly. During the Polish People's Republic era, between 1958 and 1961, a neighborhood of single-family homes was built in the area of Brzoskwiniowa and Morelowa streets. Starting in the 1950s and 1960s, construction continued on Osiedle Ducha in the area of Widok, P. Ściegienny, and Błękitna streets. The vast majority of buildings were completed by the 1970s. The western and northeastern areas of the district were also expanded – between 1960 and 1975, a housing estate was built along Akacjowa Street and at Gruszowa and Jabłoniowa streets. During the same period, apartment blocks were built on Sportowa and Złota streets.

== Education ==
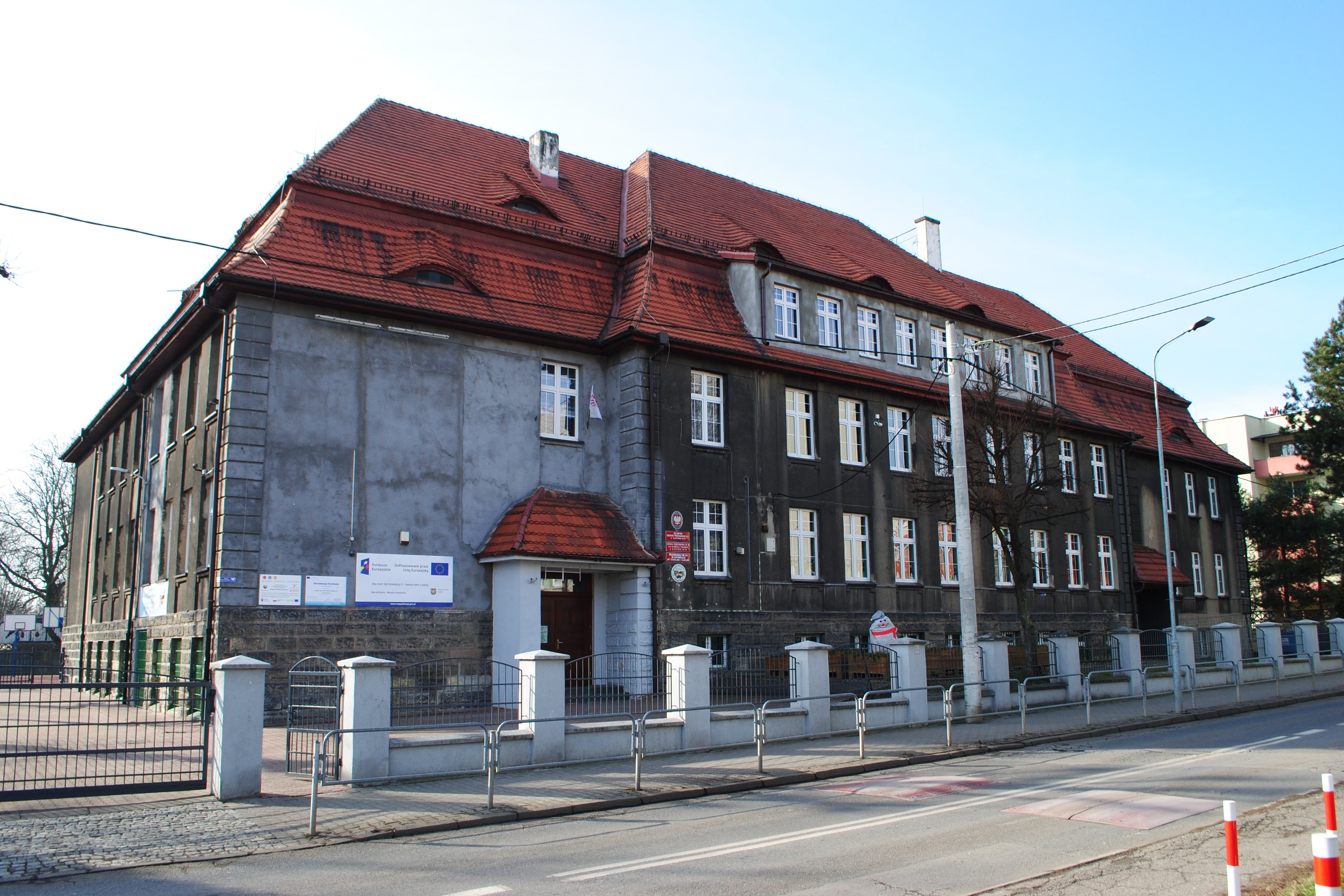
School and Kindergarten Complex No. 1 at 29 Sportowa Street (2025)

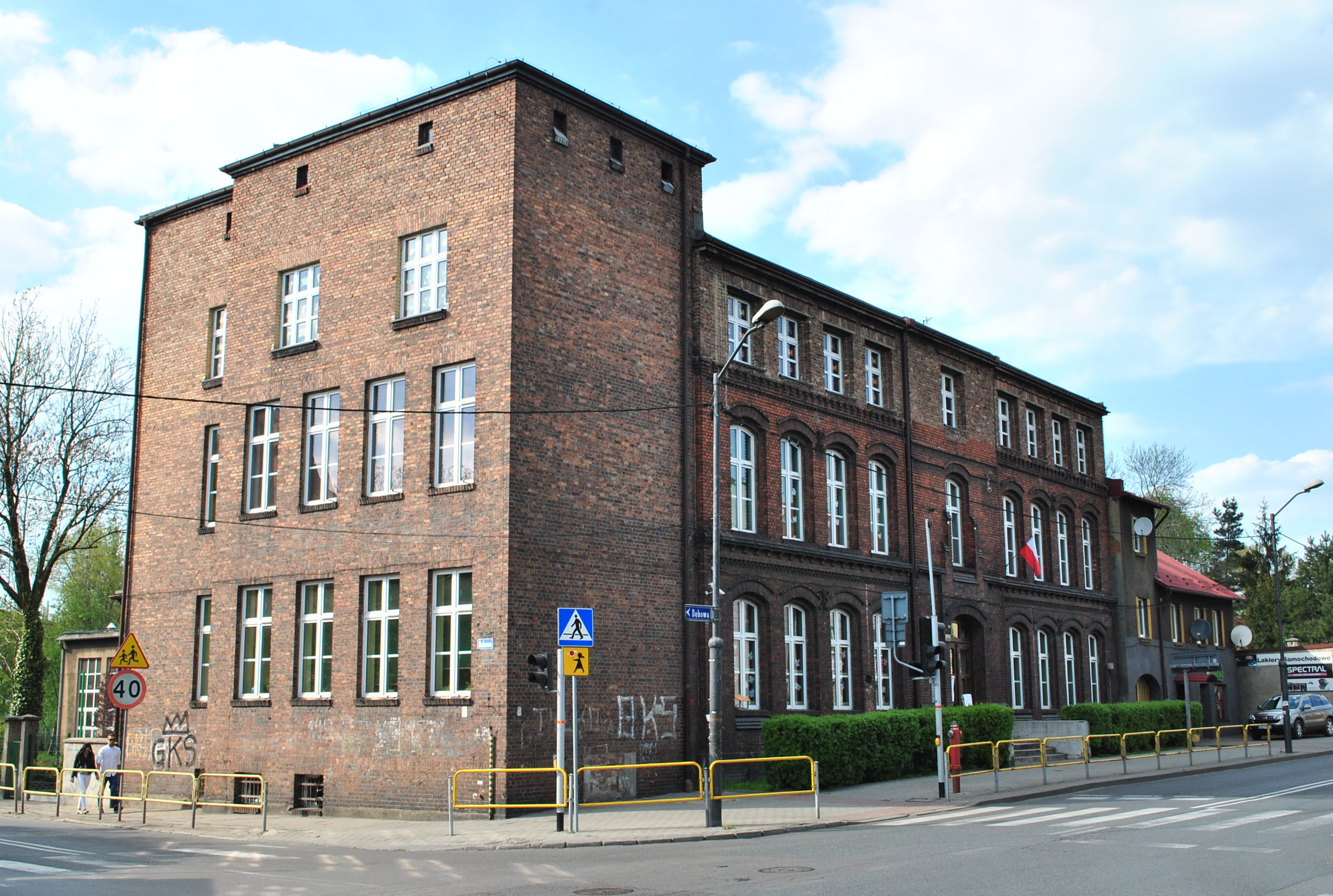
Nasza Dobra Szkoła Community Primary School at 2 Agnieszki Street (2015)

The beginnings of education in the district are linked to Father Józef Beder, who on 1 June 1827 submitted a request to the authorities of the Opole District for permission to establish a school in Dąb, arguing that the students’ homes were too far from the nearest school. After the authorities granted approval, the building, constructed near the parish church, was completed on 1 January 1828. Operalski became the first teacher. In 1834, 117 children attended the school, while by 1856 the number had risen to 256. Due to the increase in student numbers in 1850, the then-teacher Bubin submitted a request to build a new facility, but it was decided for the time being to expand the existing school and hire a new teacher. A new brick building was constructed to replace the old one in 1856. A second school in Dąb was built in 1892 on the present-day Agnieszki Street, while the school for children in Józefowiec on Józefowska Street opened in 1901. 2,980 students were enrolled and 37 teachers were employed in the three public schools during the 1910/1911 school year. In 1912, a new school on Sportowa Street was opened.

During the interwar period, in the mid-1930s, there were two public schools in Dąb:

- Primary School No. 18 – located on present-day Sportowa Street. In the mid-1930s, Karol Miarka became the school's patron. At that time, it had 535 students and 13 teachers, including Augustyn Pająk;
- Zygmunt Krasiński Primary School No. 19 – located on Agnieszki Street. It had 382 students and 9 teachers around 1935. The building was renovated between 1929 and 1933.

After World War II, the existing schools in Dąb were reorganized. From 1969, Primary School No. 19 had a new patron – Stefan Franciszok – and in 1977, a gym was opened there. In September 2017, the school moved to 12 Krzyżowa Street and is now located within the neighboring district of Wełnowiec-Józefowiec. The Nasza Dobra Szkoła Community Primary School moved into its former building. Since 2010, School No. 19 has been named after Wojciech Korfanty. On 1 September 2007, by decision of the Katowice City Council, Primary School No. 18 and Municipal Kindergarten No. 24 were merged into School and Kindergarten Complex No. 1, located at 29 Sportowa Street.

As of August 2020, the following educational institutions are located in Dąb:

1. Plastuś and Tosia Municipal Kindergarten No. 27 (27 P. Ściegienny Street);
2. School and Kindergarten Complex No. 1 (29 Sportowa Street), consisting of:
  - Municipal Kindergarten No. 24;
  - Primary School No. 18;
3. Nasza Dobra Szkoła Community Primary School (2 Agnieszki Street).

== Culture ==
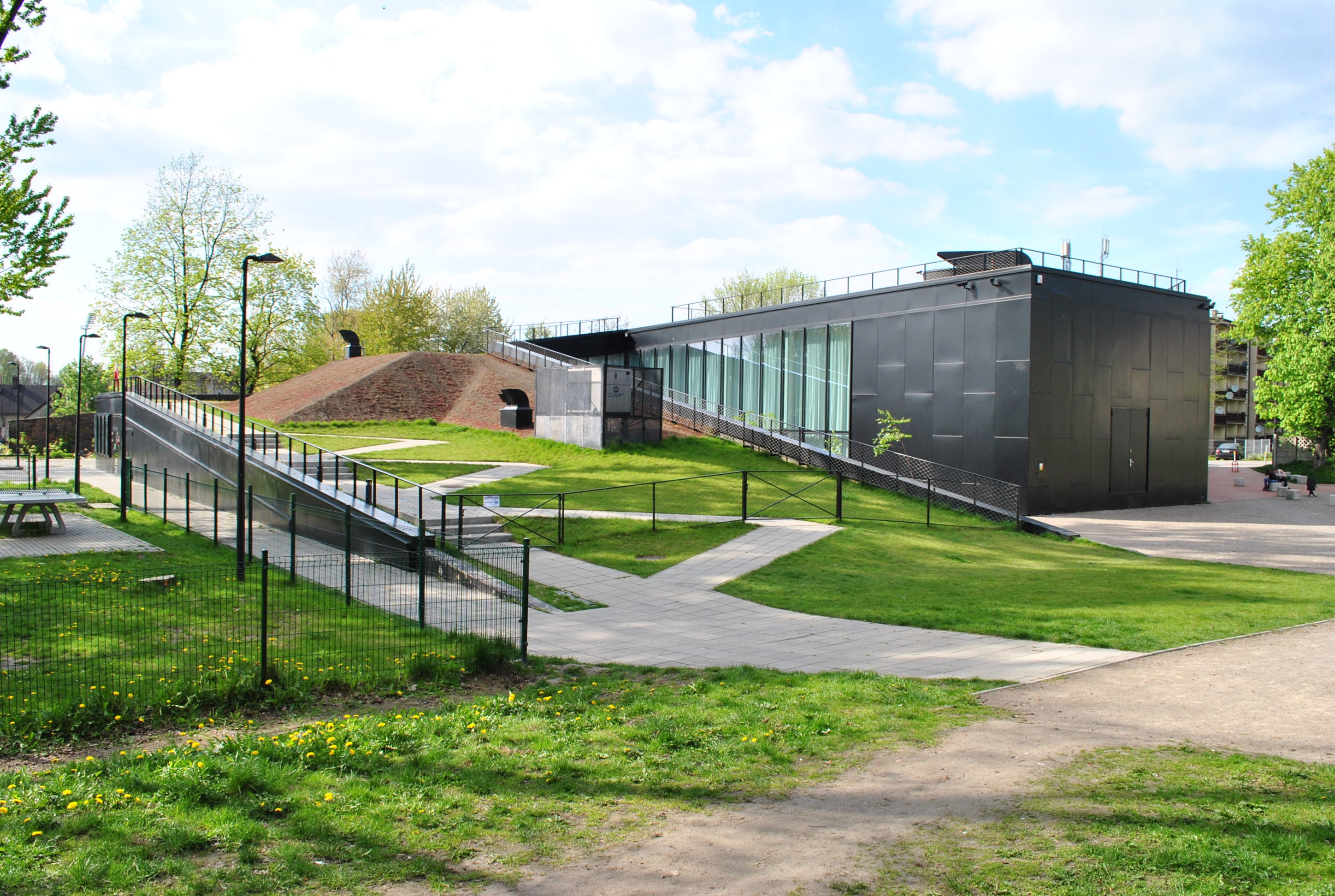
Building of the Dąb branch of the Koszutka Municipal Cultural Center and Branch No. 17 of the Katowice Municipal Public Library at 1 Krzyżowa Street

Cultural activities in Dąb began to develop in the early 19th century. Between 1882 and 1885, the Christian Workers' Association was active and organized theatrical performances. A year later, it had 154 members. Theater performances were also organized by the Society of St. Aloysius from 1892 and by the Catholic Workers' Society from 1904. In the 1880s, the Polish Reading Room expanded its activities. At the beginning of the 20th century, several choirs began their operations. The earliest was founded on 2 November 1907 – the men's choir at the Baildon Steelworks, which initially had 30 members. The inaugural concert took place on 26 January 1908. From August 1918 to 1923, the Lutnia Choir was active. At the time of its founding, it had 182 singers.

During the interwar period, the building at 14 Dębowa Street housed the Dębina Cinema. In addition, a public library with 1,980 volumes was established at 2 Dębowa Street, run by the People's Libraries Society. From 1926 to 1931, the Lutnia Men's Choir, consisting of 26 members, was active. In 1930, a men's choir was also formed at the Baildon Steelworks, and by 1939, it had 405 members. Józef Jesionek served as its long-time conductor. The choir remained active after World War II. Additionally, in 1932, the Echo Mandolin Society was founded, and in the 1920s, the Gwiazda Theater Club.

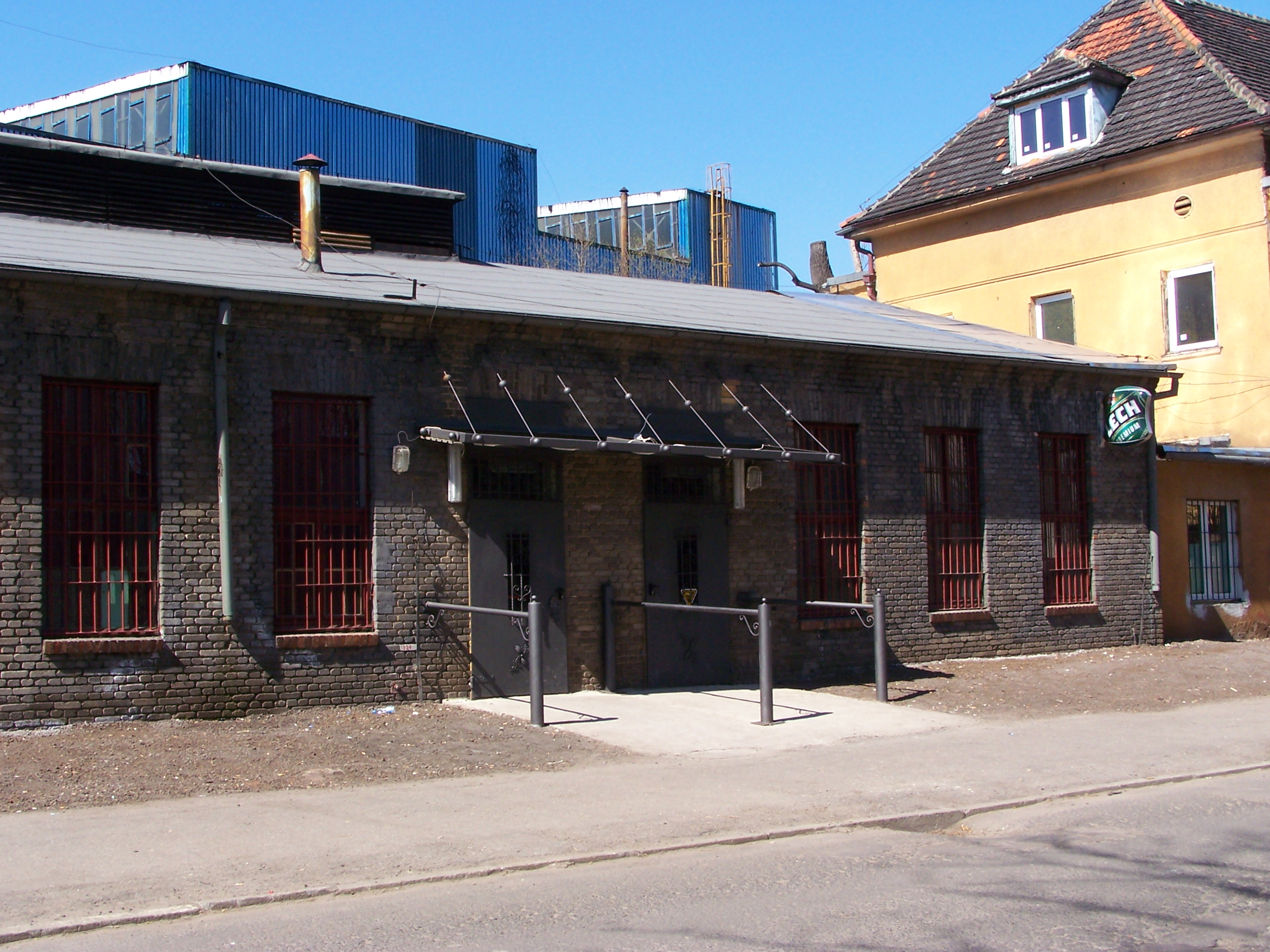
Former premises of the Mega Club music club at 9 Żelazna Street

Cultural life in Dąb largely revived following the political changes of 1989. On 25 February 1992, the Dąb Enthusiasts Association was registered, with the aim of bringing together the district's residents and organizing social and cultural events. The Miners' Cultural Center also operated in connection with the Kleofas Coal Mine. In 2005, a decision was made to construct a new, two-story building at 1 Krzyżowa Street, which was put into use in October 2014. It houses the following institutions:

- Dąb branch of the Koszutka Municipal Cultural Center – offers classes for children and youth, including music (piano/keyboard and guitar lessons), art, photography, vocal (including the Anima Canto choir), dance, and sports (gymnastics for seniors, chess, and bridge);
- Katowice Municipal Public Library. Branch No. 17 – has a library for children and adults, and also conducts library lessons and literary-educational activities.

The Mega Club, founded in 1993 as an offshoot of the Pod Rurą student club, has been operating at 9 Żelazna Street since 2007. It is one of the oldest music clubs in Katowice, hosting artists representing a variety of musical styles. In addition, other cultural events are also held there. In December 2018, the club moved its headquarters to the International Congress Center at 1 Sławika i Antalla Square.

== Religion ==
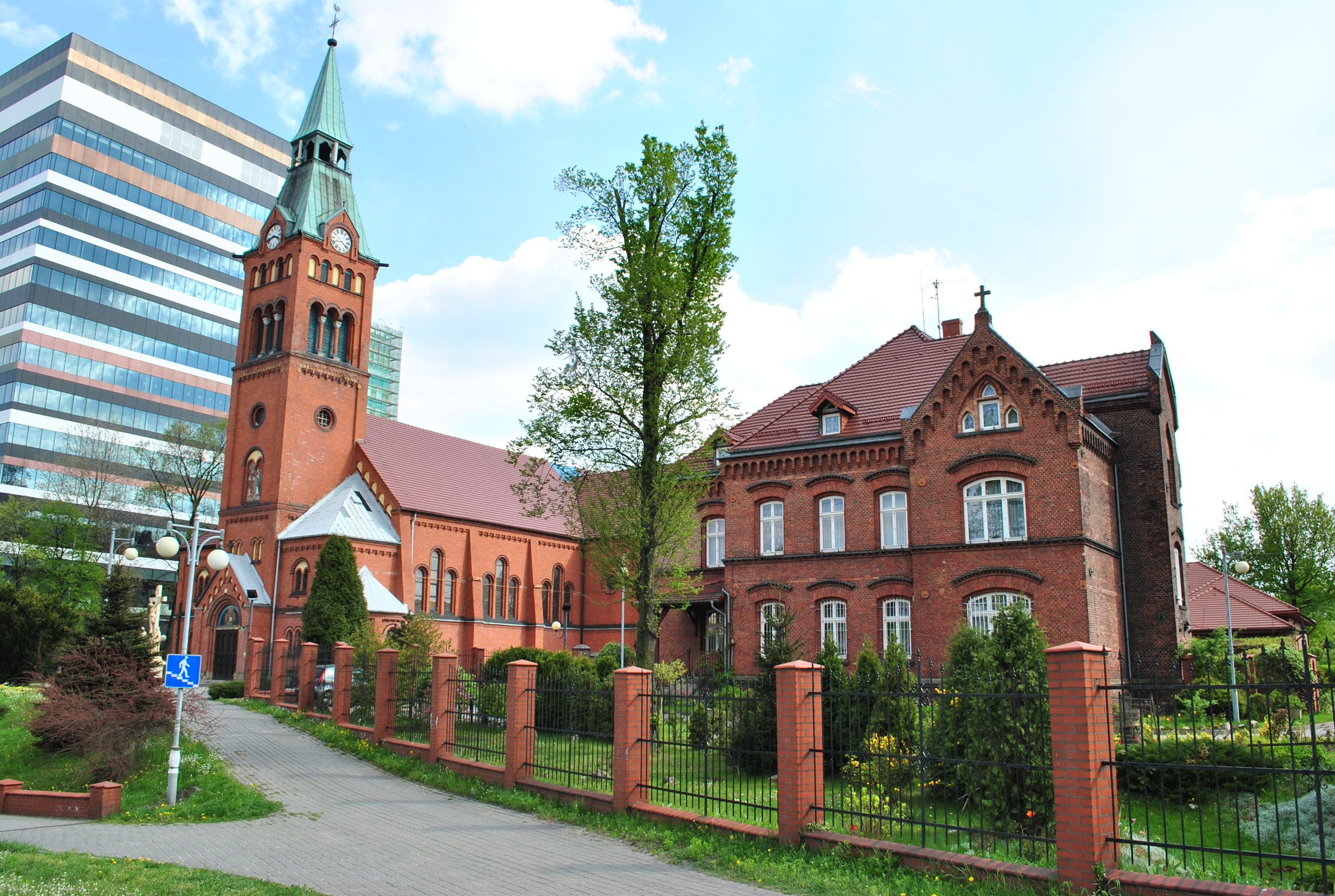
Church of Saints John and Paul and the chancel building on Chorzowska Street (2015)

The largest religious community in Dąb is the Roman Catholic Parish of Saints John and Paul, which covers the entire district. It belongs to the Katowice-Załęże deanery. In 2015, the parish had approximately 6,730 parishioners, which at the time accounted for about 90% of Dąb's residents. The origins of the parish are linked to significant population growth in the 19th century and the desire to establish a new community separate from the Chorzów parish to which the residents of Dąb belonged. The first temporary wooden church was built in 1875. At that time, priests from the Chorzów parish provided pastoral care for approximately 2,400 faithful from Dąb, Józefowiec, and Bederowiec. As this church became increasingly inadequate for the growing number of residents, Cardinal Georg Kopp issued a decree on 18 August 1894, establishing the parish in Dąb. Father Maksymilian Krocker became the first parson on 8 July 1895. In July 1897, construction began on the chancel at what is now 160 Chorzowska Street, while the construction of the parish church in the Romanesque Revival style with eclectic elements, designed by Ludwig Schneider, took place between 1901 and 1902. In 1935, in terms of religious affiliation, Dąb was home to 9,166 Catholics (over 98% of Dąb's residents), 111 Protestants, and a few Jews.

Within the Dąb parish, on the site of the former Gottwald Coal Mine near the Silesia City Center, there is the Chapel of St. Barbara, consecrated in 2005 and built in the structure that once housed the hoisting machine. Services are held there regularly, as well as classical music concerts. At the corner of Dębowa and Źródlana stands the historic Chapel of Our Lady from 1893.

== Sport and recreation ==
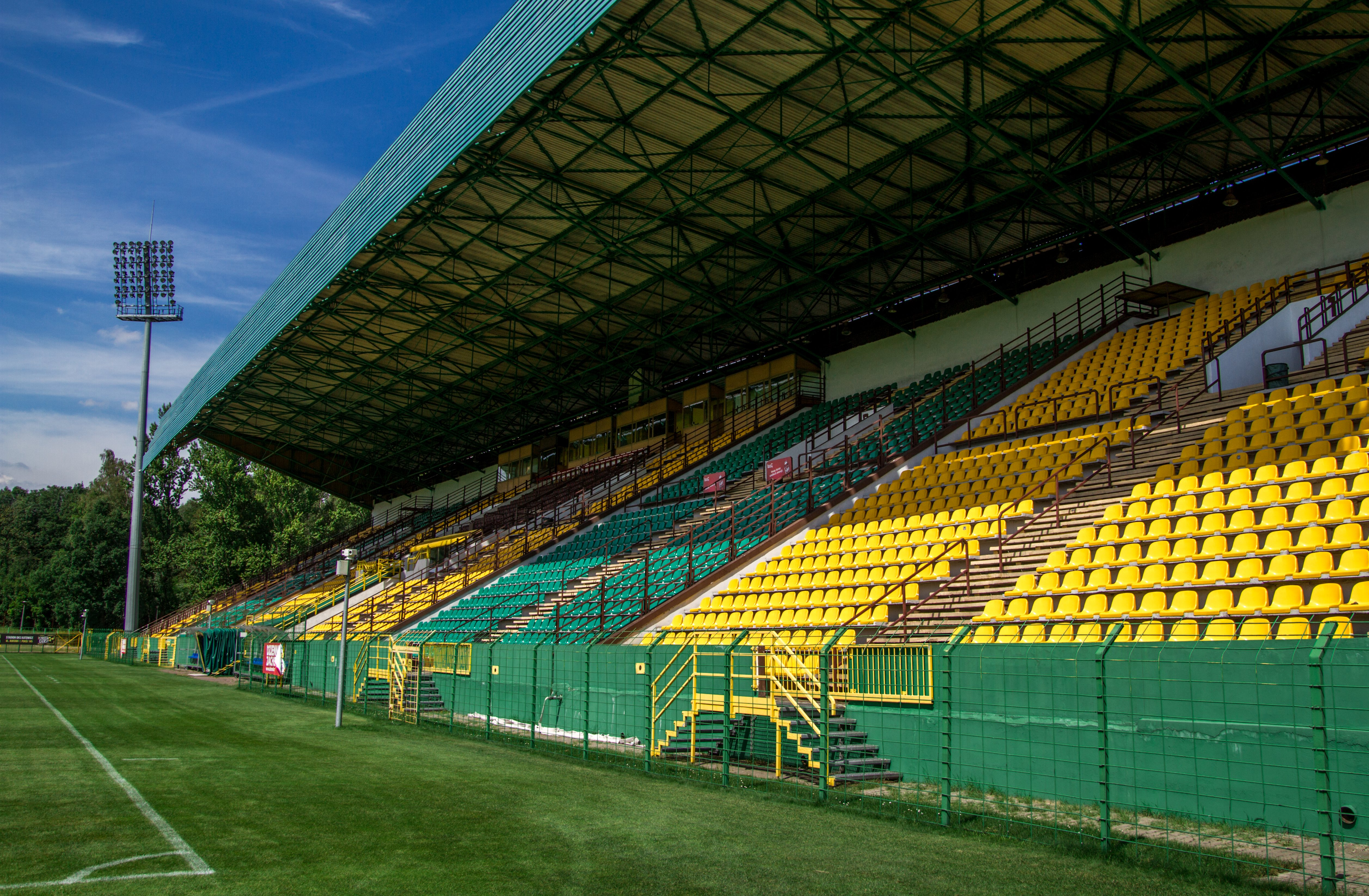
Stadium of GKS Katowice at Bukowa Street (2016)

Sports in Dąb began to develop in the early 20th century. In 1905, the Turnverein Sports Association was founded, which from 1906 operated under the name "Männer Turnverein Domb". On 12 February 1912, the Dąb-Józefowiec branch of the Sokół Gymnastic Society was established. In its first year of operation, the branch had a dozen or so members, and by 1920, 113 members. The first president was Antoni Manowski, and the gym was located at 88 Dębowa Street.

Before World War I, a Club Eiche 1911 soccer club was founded. During the interwar period, in 1922, it was reorganized into the Dąb Sports Club, which operated only as a soccer club until 1936. Since then, other sports disciplines have been developed, such as boxing, ice hockey, cycling, and track and field. During the interwar period, four additional sports clubs were active: Pogoń 1924 Chess Club, Przyszłość Workers' Sports Club (handball), Legia Sports Club (cycling), and Baildon Tennis Club.

During the interwar period, the local branch of the Sokół Gymnastic Society continued its activities until September 1939. At that time, practices were held at the gym on Krzyżowa Street. The society's members achieved their greatest successes in women's volleyball, and other sports were also developed.

After World War II, the first sports clubs were established at industrial plants – in 1945, KS Baildon began operations, and a year later, the Eminencja Mine Sports Club, which, after several name changes, adopted the name Dąb Miners' Sports Club, with its field on Sportowa Street. The main sport practiced at GKS Dąb was soccer, along with boxing, ice skating, track and field, swimming, and water polo. In 1968, it merged with GKS Katowice, founded in 1964. The new, multi-sport club became the owner of the stadium on Bukowa Street.

KS Baildon initially operated in four sports sections during the Polish People's Republic era: boxing, figure skating, swimming, and water polo. In 1969, a sports hall (which no longer exists today) was opened at the corner of Chorzowska and Żelazna streets, allowing the club to significantly expand its activities across many sports sections, achieving success particularly in tennis, table tennis, ice hockey, fencing, and weightlifting.

In November 1998, the UKS Lider Katowice biathlon club was founded at Primary School No. 18 in Katowice. It was represented by, among others, Olympians Monika Hojnisz-Staręga and Rafał Lepel.

== Public safety ==
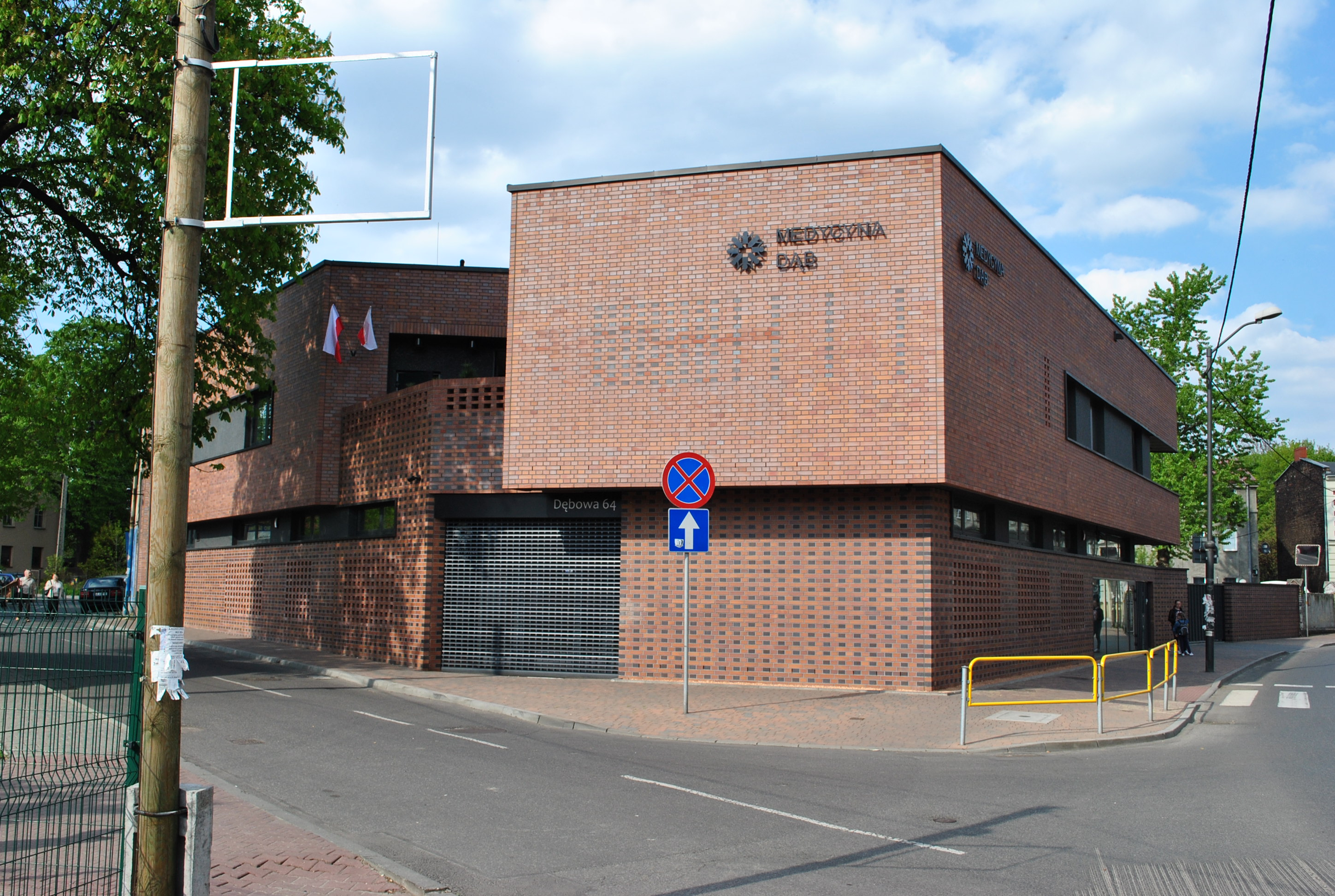
Medycyna Dąb clinic at 64 Dębowa Street (2015)

A municipal hospital had been operating in Dąb as early as the interwar period; in 1924, it was converted into an infectious diseases ward for tuberculosis patients, with 30 beds. The hospital was closed in 1934 due to mining-related damage. In addition, a clinic for mothers, run by the Sisters of the Servants, opened in 1925. In 1981, a clinic was opened at the corner of Chorzowska and Żelazna streets.

As of August 2020, the following healthcare facilities are located in Dąb:

- Prof-Med/Tommed Medical Centre – a multi-specialty medical center offering, among other services, primary care clinics, specialist clinics, a laboratory, a dental clinic, and rehabilitation and occupational medicine services;
- Klinica 2000 – a private hospital established in 1998, specializing in general surgery and ophthalmology;
- Silesian Analytical Laboratories. Sample Collection Point;
- Medycyna Dąb – a clinic specializing in the treatment of women's health issues, hormonal disorders in women and adolescents, thyroid, skin, hair, and nail conditions, gynecomastia, and aesthetic dermatology;
- Enel-Med Medical Centre – the facility includes specialist offices, procedure rooms, and blood collection and vaccination stations;
- Medicover Żelazna Medical Centre – has specialist offices, as well as procedure rooms, occupational medicine, pediatrics, and gynecology departments, and X-ray facilities.

In terms of public safety, Dąb was characterized by an average level of safety in 2007 compared to the city as a whole. At that time, it was the 13th safest district in Katowice (out of 22 districts) according to the crime rate, which then stood at 2.67 crimes per 100 residents (the average for all of Katowice was 3.08). Between 2004 and 2007, crime in the district decreased – in 2004, the crime rate was 4.16 crimes per 100 people. In 2007, there were 26 traffic accidents.

== Bibliography ==
- Absalon, Damian; Czaja, Stanisław; Jankowski, Andrzej T. (2012). "Środowisko geograficzne" [Geographical Environment]. Katowice. Środowisko, dzieje, kultura, język i społeczeństwo [Katowice. Environment, History, Culture, Language, and Society] (in Polish). Vol. 1. Katowice: Museum of History of Katowice. ISBN 978-83-8772-724-6.
- Borowy, Robert (1997). Wczoraj – dziś – jutro… kopalni „Katowice-Kleofas". Historia węglem pisana [Yesterday – Today – Tomorrow… of the "Katowice-Kleofas" Mine. A History Written in Coal] (in Polish). Katowice: KWK „Katowice-Kleofas". ISBN 83-907139-2-6.
- Rzewiczok, Urszula (1999). Dzieje Dębu (1299–1999) [History of Dąb (1299–1999)] (in Polish). Katowice: Museum of History of Katowice. ISBN 838772730X.
- Rzewiczok, Urszula, ed. (2013). Patronowie katowickich ulic i placów [Patrons of Katowice Streets and Squares] (in Polish) (2nd ed.). Katowice: Museum of history of Katowice. ISBN 978-83-87727-38-3.
- Szaraniec, Lech (1996). Osady i osiedla Katowic [Settlements and Housing Estates of Katowice] (in Polish). Katowice: Artur. ISBN 83-905115-0-9.
- Zemła, Marek, ed. (25 April 2012). Studium uwarunkowań i kierunków zagospodarowania przestrzennego miasta Katowice – II edycja. Część 1. Uwarunkowania zagospodarowania przestrzennego [Study of the Conditions and Directions of Spatial Development of the City of Katowice – Second Edition. Part One. Conditions of Spatial Development] (PDF) (in Polish). Katowice: Biuro Rozwoju Regionu.
