= Baildon Steelworks =

Coordinates: 50.2680024°N 18.9996958°E

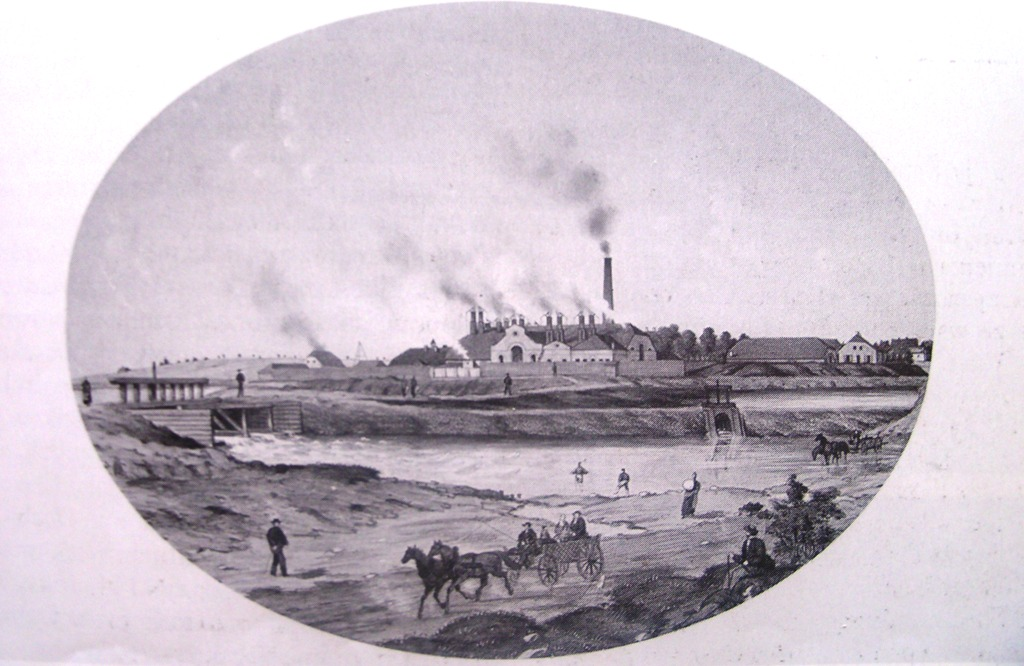
Baildon Steelworks, 19th century

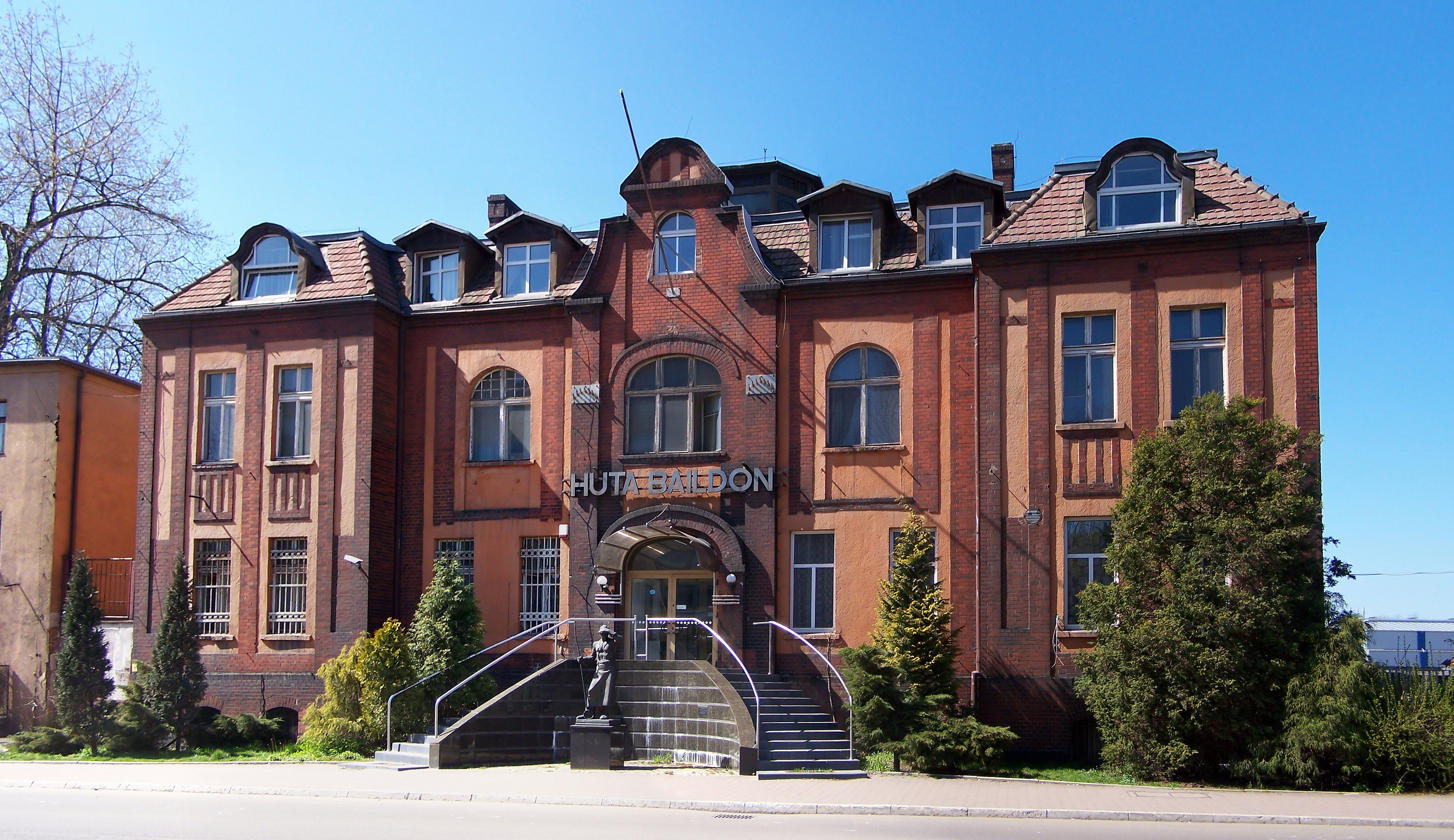
A historical building of Baildon Steelworks

Baildon Steelworks (Polish: Huta Baildon) was a major steelworks in Katowice, Poland. It was located in Katowice districts of Załęże and Dąb. Founded in 1823 (then in Prussian Silesia), it was named after Scottish engineer John Baildon who founded the steelworks in 1823, he was invited by Friedrich Wilhelm von Reden. The plant was refurbished in 1996 when the former rolling mill was replaced by brand new 16-standed continuous rolling line.

The steelworks were a major local employer and landmark until its liquidation in 2001. On August 10, 2001, 2,500 steelworkers staged one of the largest demonstrations in Poland since the 1980s. Protesters marched to the district administrative office to demand that their jobs be saved. Gonar Company, kept the steel making shop open for several years after this, however later this shut down as well.

In 2004, Rüdiger Winterhager acquired the rolling mill from the insolvency estate. Since then, the plant has been operated as part of the BGH group.
