= John Baildon =

Scottish pioneer

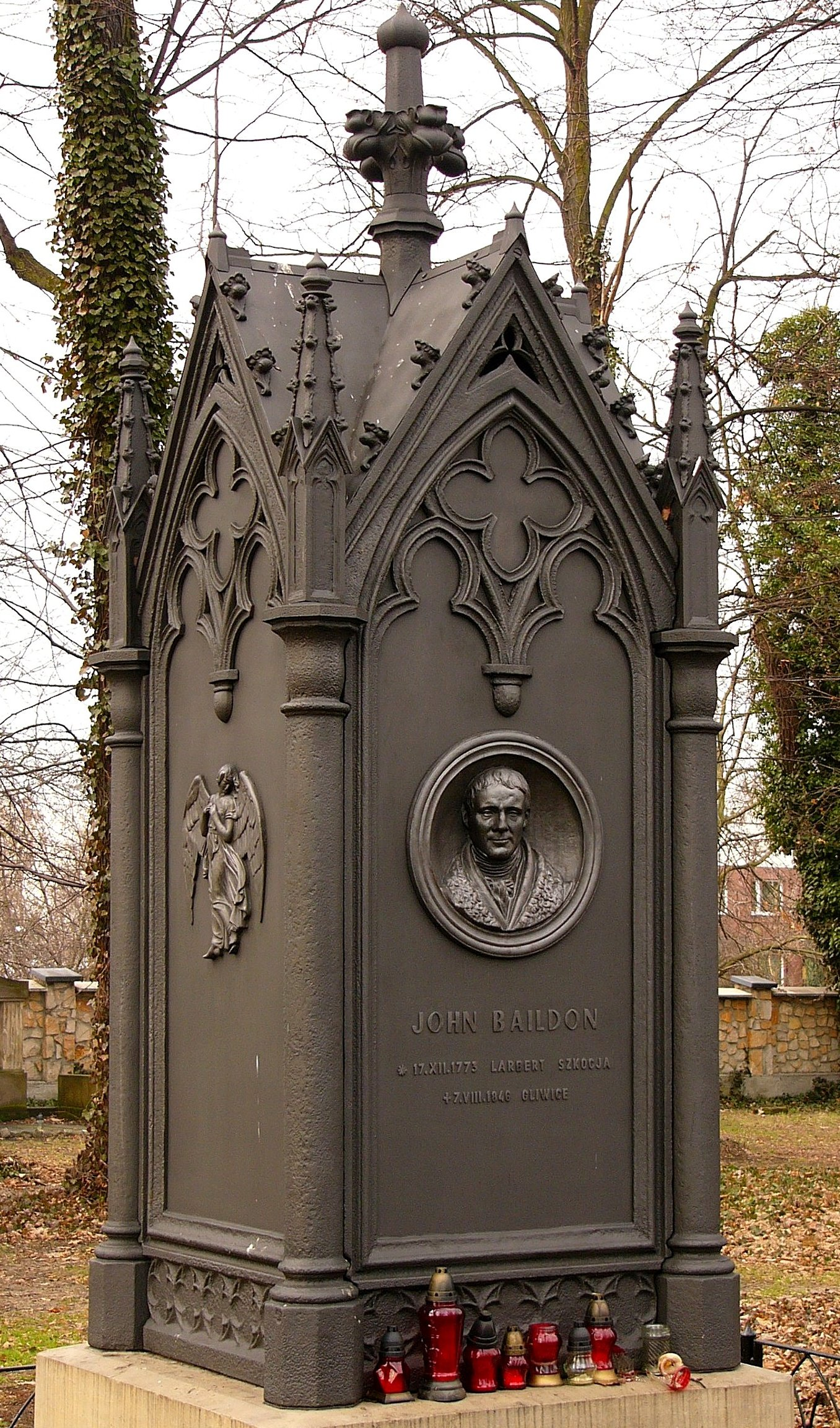
The grave of John Baildon on the Metallurgical Cemetery in present-day Gliwice, Poland

John Baildon (11 December 1772 – 7 August 1846) was a Scottish pioneer in metallurgy in continental Europe.

Baildon was born in Larbert, Stirlingshire. In 1793, he came to Prussian Silesia (in modern-day Upper Silesia, Poland) on the invitation of Friedrich von Reden. During the remainder of his life in Silesia, Baildon was involved in numerous pioneering industrial undertakings, including construction of the first blast furnaces fired by coke in continental Europe (in Gliwice (Gleiwitz) and Chorzów (Königshütte), the first pig iron produced on 21 September 1796), the Kanał Kłodnicki (Klodnitz Canal), and the first iron bridge in continental Europe (over the Strzegomka river in Łażany (Laasan), Lower Silesia, erected in Spring 1796).

John married Helene Antonie Galli, daughter of an Italian merchant, in Gliwice in 1804 and had 7 children (5 sons, 2 daughters). He died in Gliwice and is buried there at the Metallurgical Cemetery, known as the Cmentarz Hutniczy in Polish.

A major steel works (Baildon Steelworks, Katowice, established in 1823, liquidated in 2001) was named after him.
