= Murcki =

- Katowice District
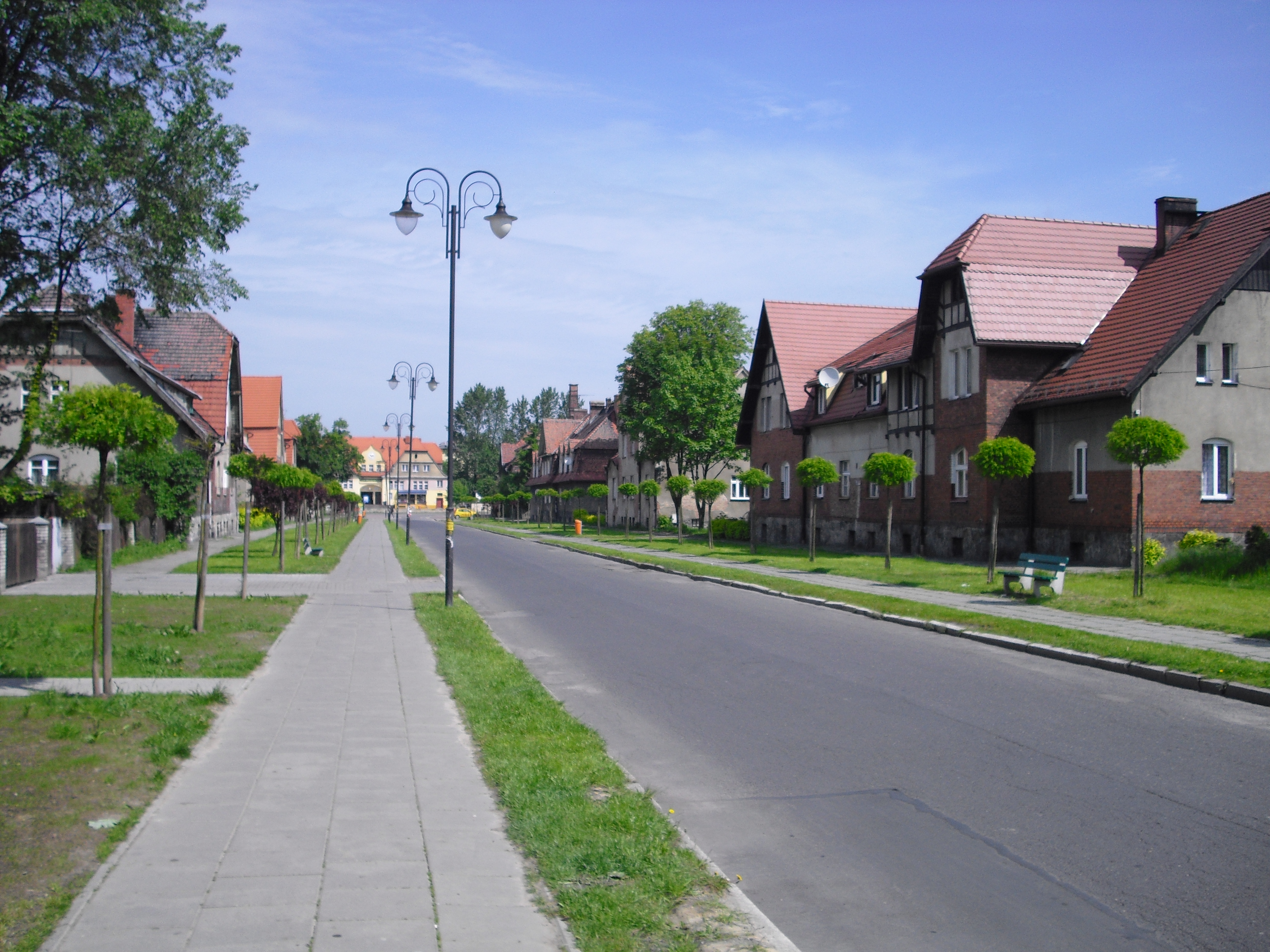
- Wolności (Freedom) Street

- Location of Murcki within Katowice
- Coordinates: 50°11′54″N 19°02′48″E
- Country: Poland
- Voivodeship: Silesian
- County/City: Katowice

Area
  - Total: 4,153 km^{2} (1,603 sq mi)

Population (2007)
  - Total: 5,796
  - Density: 1.396/km^{2} (3.615/sq mi)
- Time zone: UTC+1 (CET)
  - Summer (DST): UTC+2 (CEST)
- Area code: (+48) 032

Murcki (German: Emanuelssegen) is a district of Katowice. It has an area of 41,53 km^{2} and in 2007 had 5,796 inhabitants.
