= Giszowiec =

District of Katowice

- Katowice District
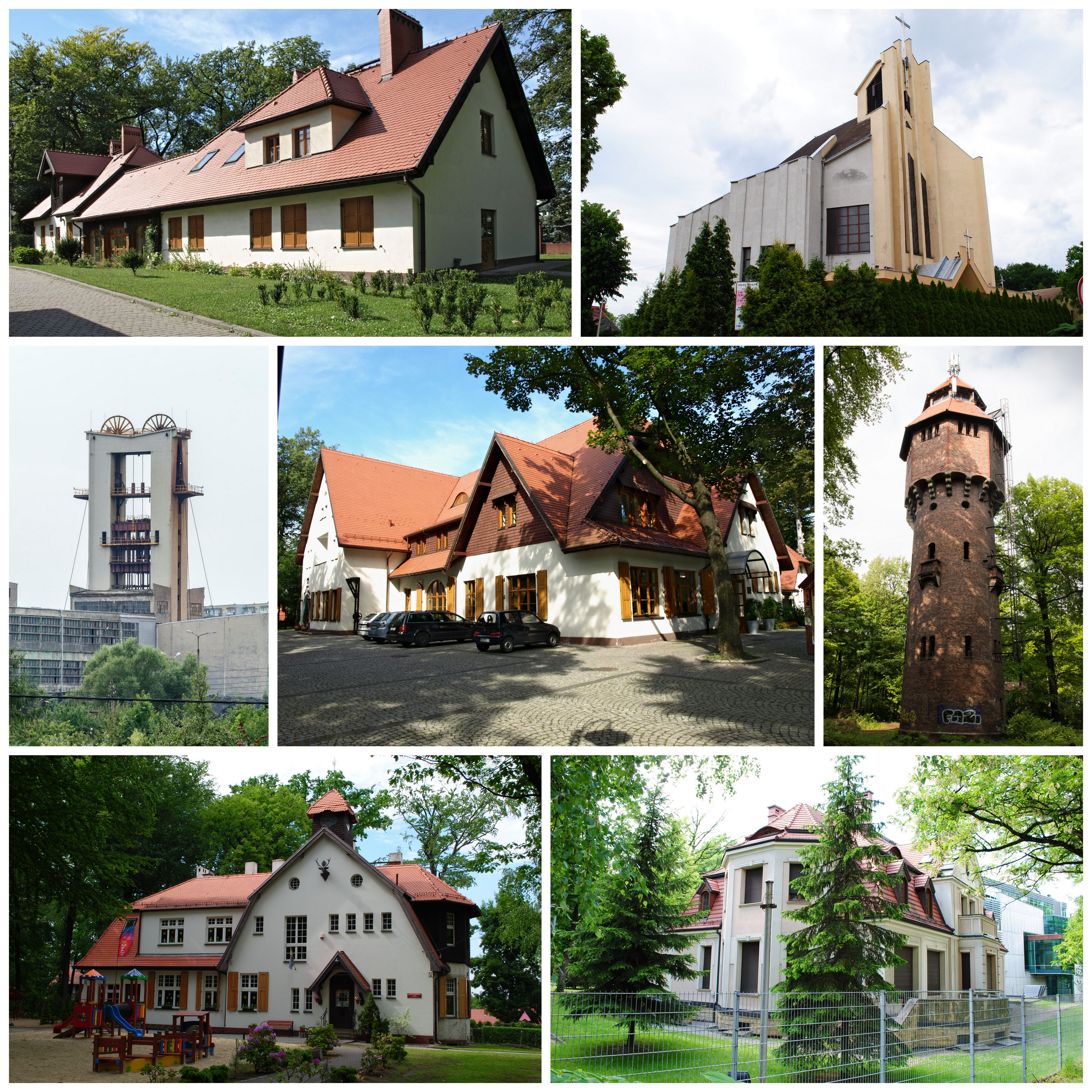
- Silesian Chamber, Church of St. Barbara, the Roździeński shaft of the Wieczorek Coal Mine, the former inn, the water tower, the headquarters of Municipal Kindergarten No. 64 in the former forester's lodge, and the villa of the director of the Giesche Coal Mine

- Location of Giszowiec within Katowice
- Coordinates: 50°13′25″N 19°04′10″E
- Country: Poland
- Voivodeship: Silesian
- County/City: Katowice
- Established: 1 January 1992

Area
  - Total: 12.03 km^{2} (4.64 sq mi)
- Elevation: 260–310 m (850–1,020 ft)

Population (2019)
  - Total: 15,719
  - Density: 1,307/km^{2} (3,384/sq mi)
- Time zone: UTC+1 (CET)
  - Summer (DST): UTC+2 (CEST)
- Area code: (+48) 032

Giszowiec (German: Gieschewald) is a historic company town, a part and an eastern district of the city of Katowice (Silesian Voivodeship, Poland), created as a coal miners' settlement in 1907. Initially consisting of about 3,300 miners and their families, the district's population have grown over the years to over 18,000. Although Giszowiec's architectural originality suffered major damages in the 1970s and 1980s due to large scale urbanization, its early unique character can be still felt in the surviving miners' housings, the marketplace, numerous individual buildings and structures, as well as the relatively well preserved general design of a "Garden city".

Giszowiec consists of large-panel-system buildings and historic houses, mostly single- and two-family, which once formed a compact mining housing estate that remains unique in Europe to this day and is part of the Silesian Industrial Monuments Route. It was built for miners working at the Giesche Coal Mine (later the Wieczorek Coal Mine) by the Georg von Giesches Erben company, commissioned by its director Anton Uthemann between 1907 and 1910. The housing estate was designed by Emil and Georg Zillmann. Two-thirds of the mining settlement was demolished in the 1970s as a result of the development of high-rise large-panel-system buildings for employees of the Staszic Coal Mine, established in 1964.

Giszowiec is mainly a residential and industrial area. It is surrounded by two major transportation routes: national road 86 and the A4 motorway, and national road 81 begins there. The district covers an area of 12.03 km² (7.30% of the city's total area) and had a population of 15,719 in 2019.

== Geography ==
=== Location ===
Giszowiec is located in the Silesian Voivodeship and is one of the administrative districts of the city of Katowice (No. 17), situated in the eastern part of the city. It lies some 7 kilometers southeast from the center of Katowice. The settlement is somewhat isolated from other Katowice districts and is surrounded by green areas and forests. It borders the districts of Osiedle Paderewskiego-Muchowiec and Janów-Nikiszowiec to the north, the city of Mysłowice to the east, the Murcki district to the south, and Piotrowice-Ochojec to the west. The district's boundaries are:

- from the north – along the southern edge of 73 Pułku Piechoty Street to the intersection with Pszczyńska Street, then along the A4 motorway and the northern edge of Mysłowicka Street to the city boundary,
- from the east – the district boundary also serves as the city boundary with Mysłowice,
- from the south and west – along the city boundary to the junction with Bielska Street and further along the forest road to 73 Pułku Piechoty Street.

Giszowiec is located in the valley of the Bolina. According to Jerzy Kondracki's physio-geographical regionalization, the district is located in the Katowice Upland mesoregion, which forms the southern part of the Silesian Upland. Historically, it forms part of eastern Upper Silesia.

=== Geology, terrain and soils ===
According to Jerzy Kondracki's physical-geographical classification, Giszowiec is located in the Silesian-Kraków Upland subprovince, within the Silesian Upland, in the southern part of the Katowice Upland, while in terms of morphological units, the district is situated on the Murcki Plateau. The northern slopes, descending toward the Rawa depression, are dissected by two long valleys, including the Bolina, which flows through Giszowiec. Large areas of Tertiary denudational flats are found there at elevations above 300 m above sea level. The highest point of Giszowiec, located in the southwestern part of the district, reaches an elevation of 300–310 m above sea level, while the lowest point is in the Bolina valley (approximately 260 m above sea level).

The landscape of Giszowiec has undergone significant changes as a result of human economic activity, mainly due to the extraction of raw materials, industrial development, and the construction of transportation infrastructure. Giszowiec also has mining spoil tips, and subsidence processes are occurring there, resulting in the formation of artificial ponds in depressions. Giszowiec is prone to Category I ground deformation in the northern, eastern, and southern parts. The apartment buildings in Osiedle Adama are resistant to Category II ground deformation. The area is also prone to rock mass tremors.

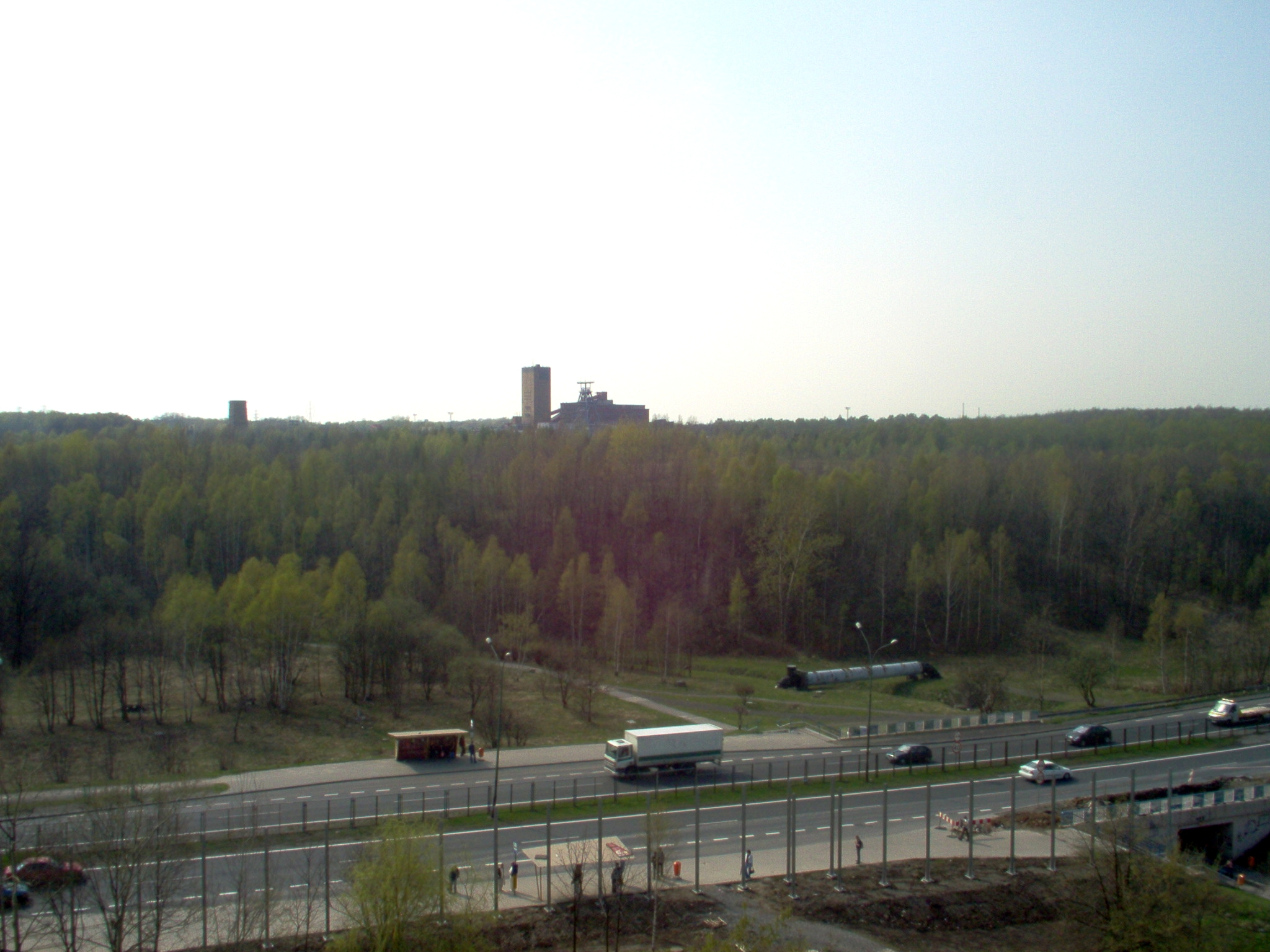
View from a building on Mysłowicka Street looking west toward the Staszic Coal Mine; in the foreground, a mining spoil tip

The largest degraded and devastated area is the post-mining spoil tip at the Staszic Coal Mine, covering 12 hectares. It reaches a height of 20 meters on the eastern side and 7 meters on the western side. Its final shape was formed in the mid-1990s. It is overgrown with ruderal vegetation (the slopes are wooded, and low shrubs grow at the top).

In terms of geological structure, Giszowiec is located in the Upper Silesian Sinkhole. The formations filling the basin date from the Upper Carboniferous and consist of shales, sandstones, and conglomerates with seams of coal that formed over 300 million years ago. The outcrops of these rocks, found over a significant area of Giszowiec, consist mainly of the Orzesze layers (predominantly shales, including clay shales, which were used by brickworks in Giszowiec, among other places). In the river valleys, however, there are post-glacial Pleistocene formations in the form of fluvisols, silts, sands, and river gravels. Areas of Holocene tills are also present in Giszowiec.

The majority of Giszowiec is covered by luvisols formed from tills as well as loamy and silty sands. They are quite fertile, and their pH is slightly acidic or neutral. Fluvisols have developed in the river valleys. As a result of human activity, they have also undergone transformations in many places, leading to the formation of anthrosols. In terms of soil quality class, the soils in Giszowiec are mainly classified as poor and very poor (classes V and VI).

=== Surface and groundwater ===
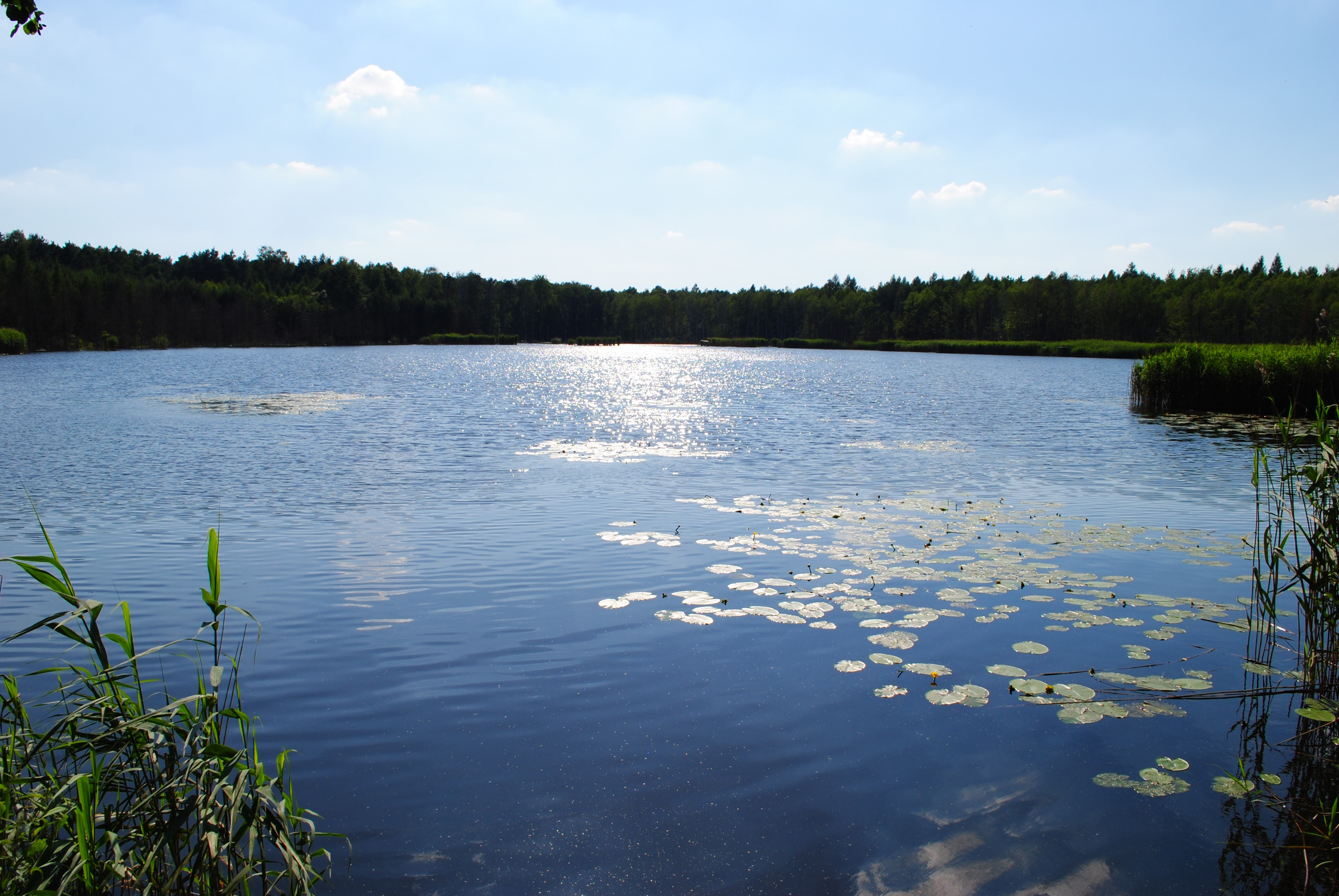
Barbara Pond

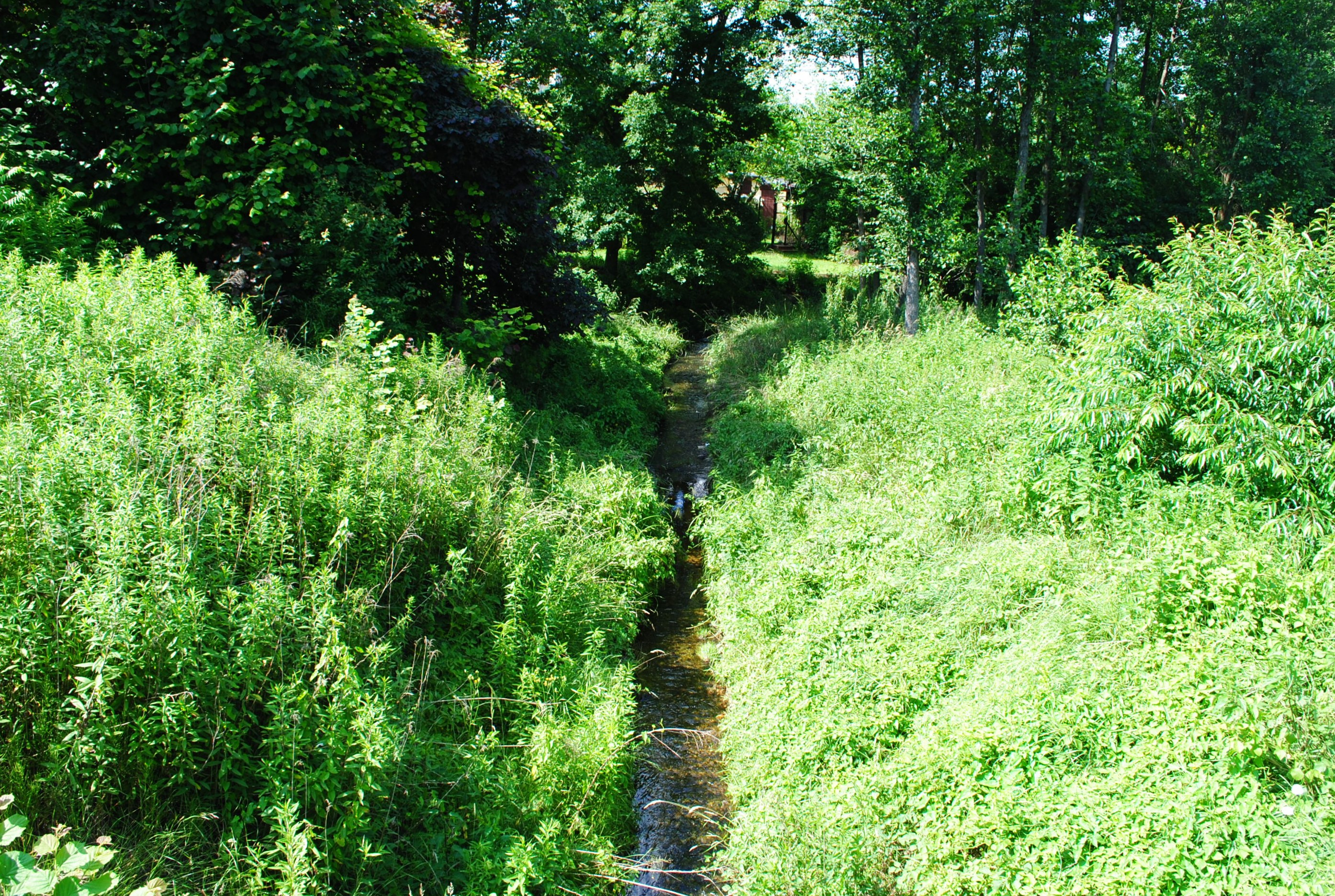
Southern Bolina I near Górniczego Stanu Street

Giszowiec is located in the Bolina drainage basin, which is part of the Vistula basin. The source of the Bolina is situated near the district, southwest of its center. Within Giszowiec, the Bolina flows northeast and eventually joins the Czarna Przemsza. In terms of water quality, the Bolina at its confluence with the Czarna Przemsza was classified as Class V in 2006, which represents the lowest water quality class, making the water unsuitable for use.

As a result of human activity, anthropogenic water bodies have formed in Giszowiec, located mainly in the Bolina valley. These are: Barbara-Janina, Górnik, Małgorzata, and other smaller floodplains. The largest of these is the Barbara reservoir, with an area of 4.02 ha.

Giszowiec is located within the Silesian-Kraków hydrogeological region. Aquifers are present there in all stratigraphic layers, but their significance depends on geological and hydrogeological factors as well as human influence. There are no major groundwater reservoirs beneath Giszowiec, while the district is covered by groundwater body No. 134. The groundwater balance is significantly influenced by mining activities related to mine dewatering.

=== Climate ===
The climate of Giszowiec does not differ significantly from that of Katowice as a whole. The area has a transitional temperate climate, with oceanic influences predominating over continental ones. Westerly winds dominate (accounting for about 60% of the total), followed to a lesser extent by easterly and southerly winds. The average annual temperature for the 1961–2005 period at the nearby station in Muchowiec is 8.1°C, but the urban heat island effect is also noticeable there, which locally modifies the air temperature. The warmest month is July (17.8°C), and the coldest is January (–2.2°C). The average annual sunshine duration for the 1966–2005 period was 1,474 hours. The average annual precipitation for the 1951–2005 period was 713.8 mm.

=== Nature and environmental protection ===
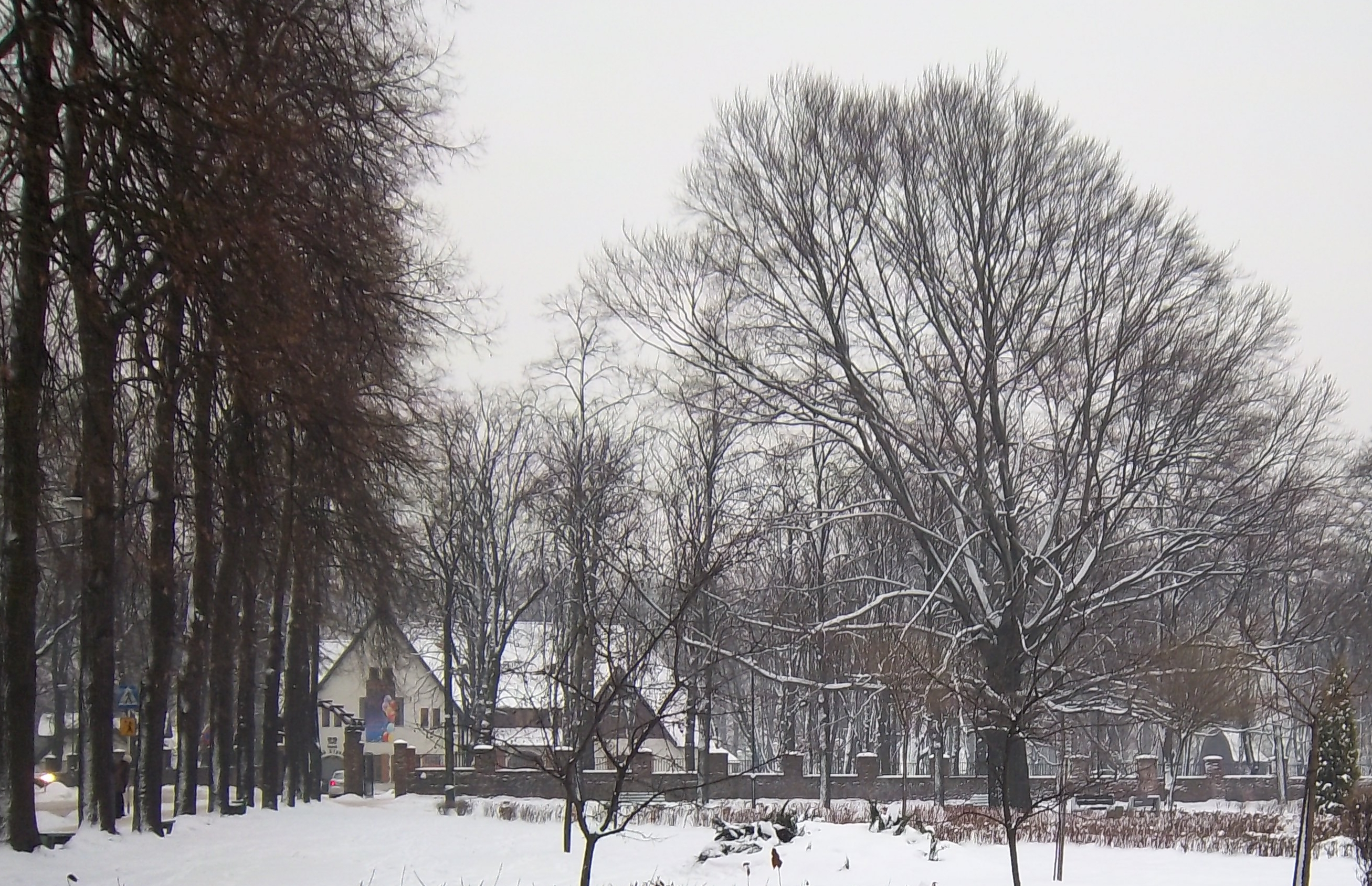
Pod Lipami Square in winter scenery; pictured on the right is the Anton Beech planted in 1907, which died after 2015

Giszowiec is characterized by a high proportion of green spaces within the district's total area. It was once part of the former Silesian Forest. Beech and hornbeam-oak forests were the predominant vegetation on the Murcki Plateau. River valleys, meanwhile, were covered with riparian forests. Giszowiec began to undergo transformations with the construction of the housing estate and the start of coal mining in the early 20th century. Along with the expansion of human activity, changes also occurred in the environment, including the landscape (spoil tips and sinkholes), the hydrological network (the channeling of rivers and the creation of artificial reservoirs), and the flora and fauna. Some large animals have become extinct (of the large ones, only red deer and wild boar remain), while new species associated with open areas have appeared. In addition, non-native plant and animal species have also appeared. In water bodies, they have established themselves naturally, and have also been intentionally introduced by humans (mainly fish).

Giszowiec currently encompasses a section of the Murcki Forests, which is a large forest complex. Part of the forests within the district, near the border with Piotrowice-Ochojec, is protected as the Źródła Kłodnicy nature and landscape reserve. This area is covered by riparian forest with a well-preserved tree stand. There are also stands of Veratrum lobelianum, a mountain plant. Frogs and toads can be found in the undergrowth, and numerous bird species, such as blackbirds, tits, nuthatches, and woodpeckers, nest in the trees.

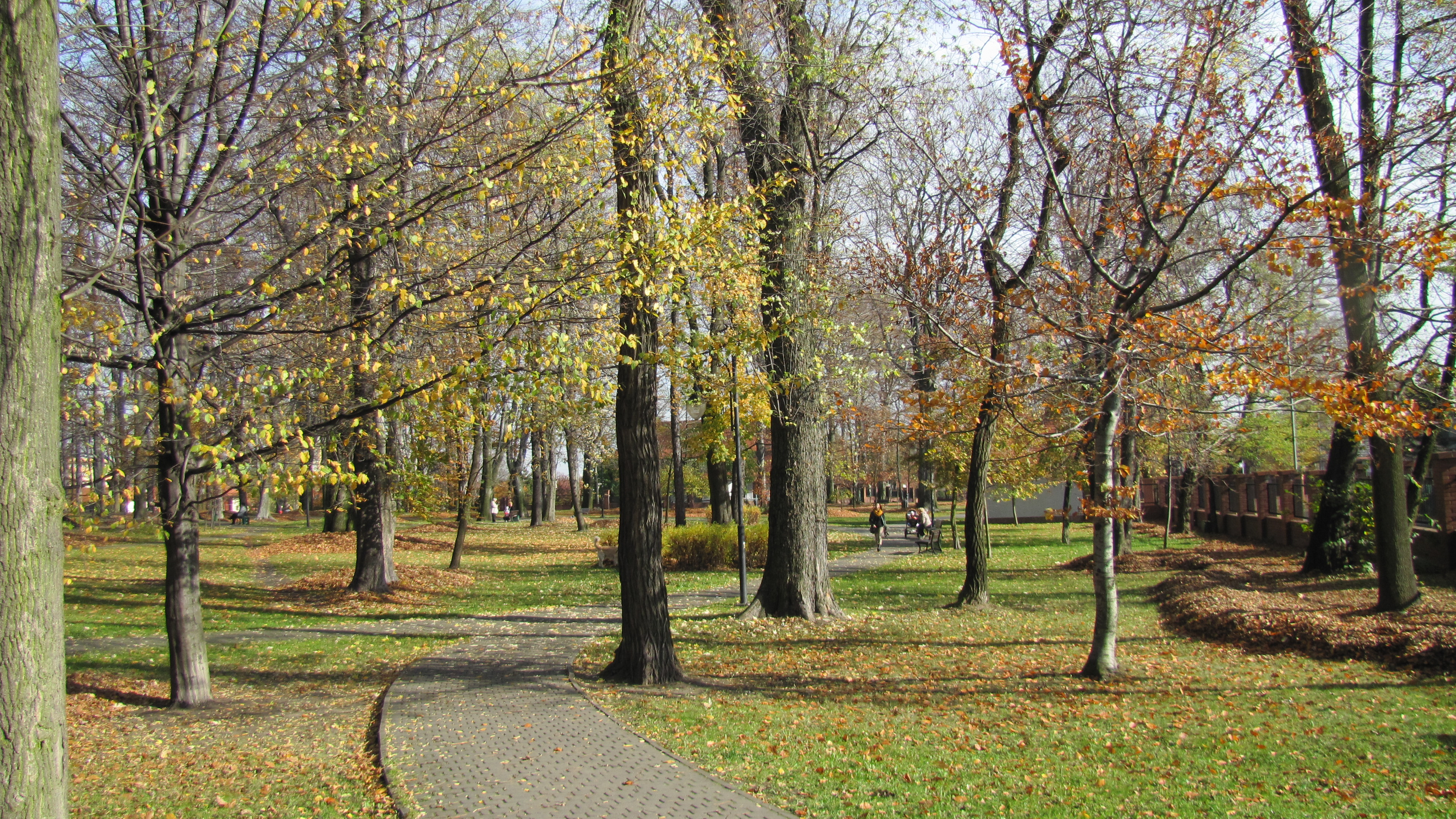
Fragment of Giszowiec Park

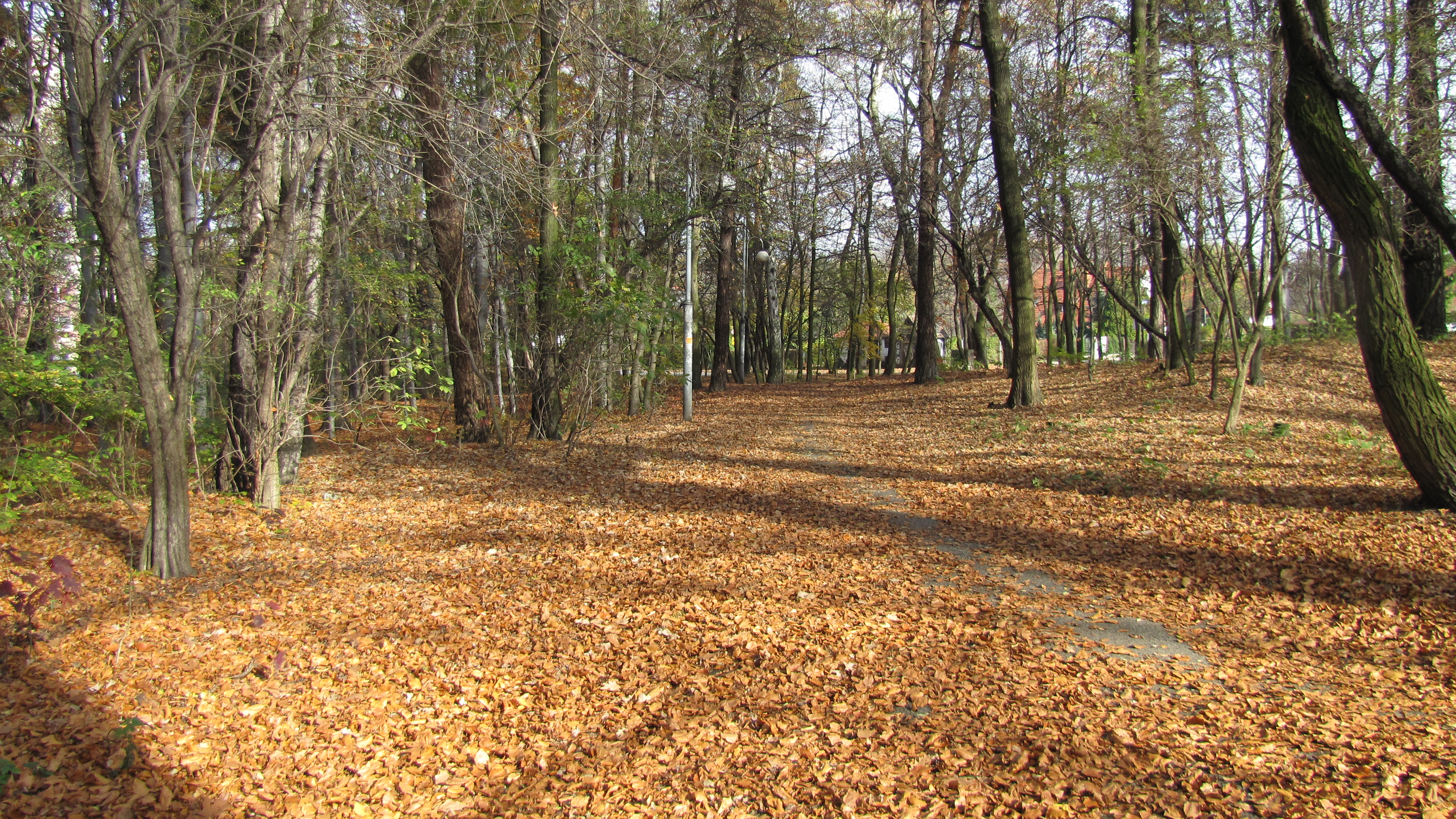
Fragment of the forest near the Church of St. Stanislaus Kostka

The urbanized areas of Giszowiec are home to over 30 natural monuments, found mainly in parks (primarily in Giszowiec Park). These are largely beech and oak trees. One of the historic trees is the now-dead Anton Beech, planted in 1907, which won second place in 2011 in a poll organized by Gaja Club for Tree of the Year.

Giszowiec was designed based on the garden city concept. During the design process, as much of the old beech and oak-hornbeam forest stand as possible was preserved. A green center was designated in the heart of the district, with development zones arranged around it. A buffer zone was created on the outskirts. Currently, the following squares and landscaped green areas are located within Giszowiec:

- Barbara-Janina – a fragment of riparian forest with water bodies located in the Bolina valley, west of Pszczyńska Street, where a recreational center has been established. It is home to populations of protected and rare plants, as well as protected amphibians. The total area is 33.5 hectares.
- Ewald Gawlik Square – a square located at the intersection of Wojciecha and Barbórki streets, established by a resolution of the Katowice City Council on 26 October 2016,
- Giszowiec Park – a park located in the central part of the district, at Pod Lipami Square, covering an area of 3.39 ha,
- Forest in the quarter bounded by Pszczyńska, Górniczego Stanu, Wojciecha, and Barbórki streets – it is managed extensively and contains an old beech forest of high natural value, which is partially protected. The area covers 4.43 ha.

Allotment gardens in Giszowiec are administered by the Silesian Regional Board of the Polish Allotment Gardeners' Association, Katowice Branch. The first gardens in Giszowiec were established in 1953 – the first of these was the Barbara Workers' Allotment Gardens, and in 1975, the Staszic Allotment Garden Association was organized on wasteland near the Roździeński shaft. The table below presents basic data on the allotment gardens currently located in Giszowiec:

Name	Location	Area (ha)	Number of plots (2007)
Barbara	120 Mysłowicka Street	5.23	110
Staszica	Kosmiczna Street	3.45	130

== Name ==
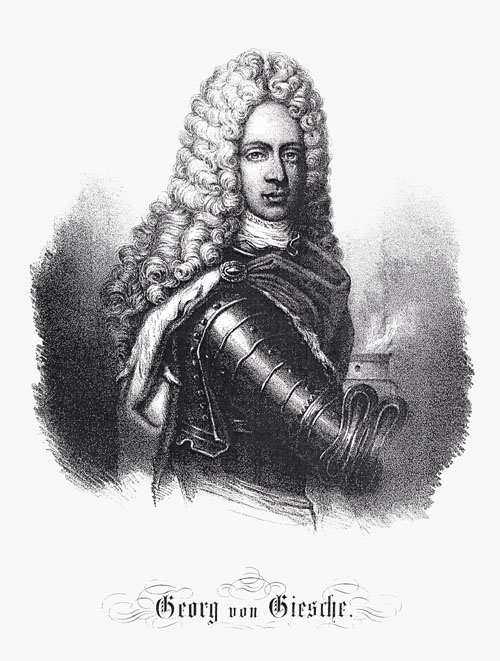
Georg von Giesche

The name of Giszowiec derives from the surname of Georg von Giesche and is a Polonized version of the German name Gieschewald (Giesche's forest); the surname Giesche was phonetically adapted to Gisz, with the suffix -owiec added. This name was given to the estate by the mining and metallurgical company Georg von Giesches Erben (Heirs of Giesche). The German name has both a commemorative (derived from the surname of the former landowner) and topographical character, as the estate was established on the edge of a forest and planned according to the urban concept of a garden city.

The Polish name of the estate was first established in 1920 by Konstanty Prus in the List of Localities of Polish Upper Silesia, where "Gieschewald" appears as "Giszowice". In the Journal of Laws of Silesia of 1922, the Giszowiec manor area is already listed under the name that is used to this day, while the authors of the Etymological Dictionary of Geographical Names of Silesia incorrectly state that the German name is "Gieschwald", which they claim comes from the German word giessen (to pour), although the name actually derives from the surname Giesche.

In the period of the Polish People's Republic, the former German name "Giszowiec" was persistently opposed, and the name "Stanisław Staszic Housing Estate" was promoted instead. The authorities of the time viewed the entire estate and its name as relics of capitalism; therefore, with the help of propaganda in the press, including Dziennik Zachodni, they attacked both the founder of the Giesche dynasty and his descendants, claiming that they had pursued a policy of national, social, and economic oppression. Ultimately, the Municipal National Council in Katowice renamed Giszowiec to Stanisław Staszic Housing Estate on 15 November 1979. The name derived from the Staszic Coal Mine and was included on all city maps from that period; sometimes the traditional name "Giszowiec" was given in parentheses, but always in second place. This change, being artificial, did not catch on in the public consciousness, as residents continued to use the traditional name, which persisted in reference to both the old and new parts of the estate. Finally, the Katowice City Council restored the name "Giszowiec" in 1990 on the initiative of Jerzy Forajter.

== History ==
=== Before the establishment ===
Before the estate was established, the Giszowiec area was covered by a forest that was part of the former Silesian Forest. The first settlements were linked to mining activities involving the extraction of coal, but these were conducted on a small scale at the time. The first mine founded in Giszowiec was the Bergthal Coal Mine, which opened in 1788 near the present-day brickworks on Górniczego Stanu Street; it operated until 1823. The next two mines, Eisenbahn and Jacob, began production by the 1850s. The latter was granted a license on 17 February 1840, and mining began there in 1851. On 26 September 1855, the Pepita Coal Mine, which was located near the present-day Osiedle Adama, was granted a mining concession. In the 1860s, the Susanna Coal Mine was also opened. Most of the mining rights in these three mines belonged to the Tiel-Winckler family. In 1863, a road was built connecting Katowice (Zawodzie) with Murcki and further with Pszczyna (the present-day Pszczyńska Street).

=== Beginnings ===
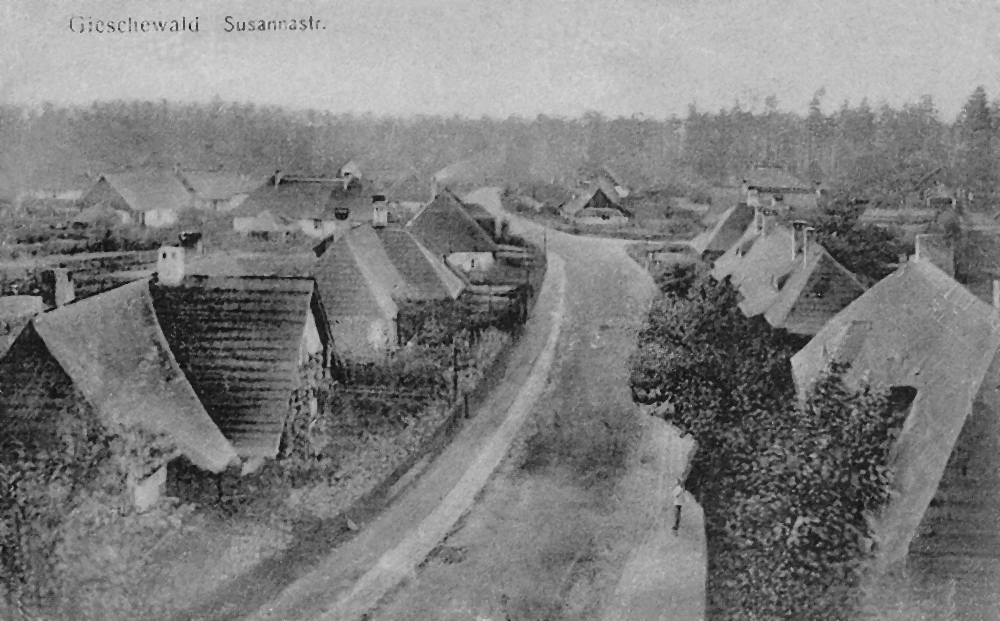
Postcard from around 1915 depicting one of the streets of Giszowiec (then known as Susannastraße; now Batalionów Chłopskich Street)

The estate dates back to the early 20th century. In 1905, the management of the Georg von Giesches Erben company (Heirs of Georg von Giesche) decided to begin mining new coal deposits in the Reserve mining field, established in 1896. On 9 May 1899, the company purchased the field along with the adjacent lands from Count Franz Hubert von Tiele-Winkler for 30 million marks. Almost two-thirds of the Mysłowice forest area was acquired. Between 1903 and 1910, the Carmer (now Pułaski) double shaft was sunk to 450 meters, and the installation of new machinery began. Approximately 1,500 workers were needed to begin mining operations, and to recruit them, the company had to offer new housing; since it did not have any available, it decided to build a new housing estate. On 14 April 1906, an application was submitted to the County Office requesting permission to establish an estate. Two months later, a permit was issued for the construction of a workers' and clerks' housing estate, and along with it came an order to partially finance the construction of a new church in Janów, build schools and a hospital, install street lighting, and provide fire protection. The plan called for the construction of a housing estate for 642 families, including 600 for workers' families, 17 for mine officials, 11 for teachers, and 14 for municipal officials, forest district officials, and service personnel for the future housing estate. It was also decided to build the estate in the form of low-rise houses, and although the construction cost was higher than for multi-family buildings, the mine could extract coal beneath the estate using the caving method, as otherwise it would have had to use the more expensive fluid backfill method.

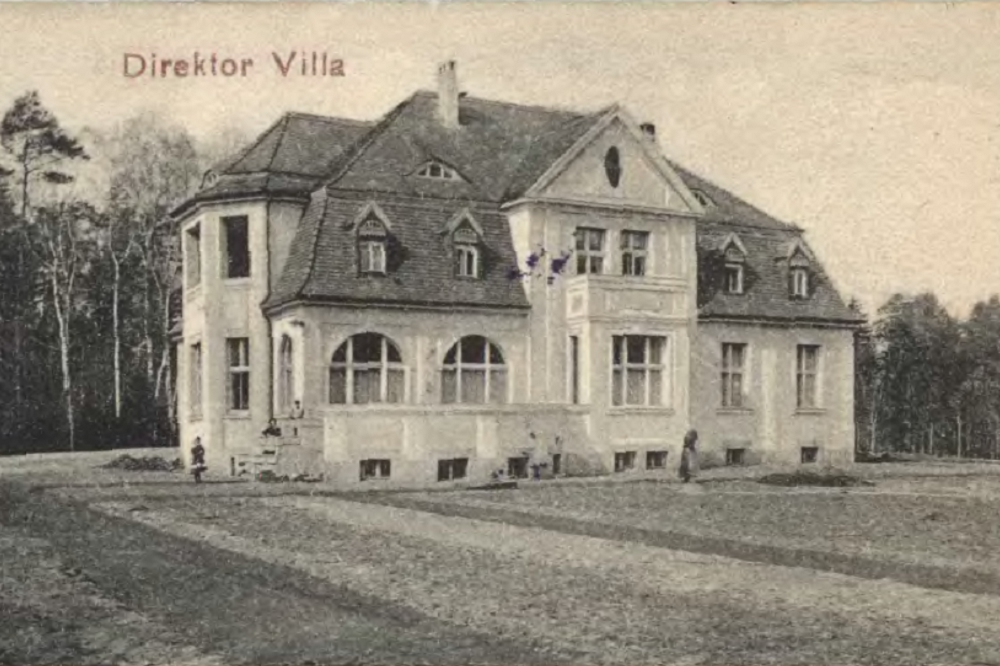
Villa of the Giesche Coal Mine director on a fragment of a postcard from around 1909

On 1 July 1907, the Giszowiec manorial estate was established, covering the lands belonging to the Giesche heirs' holding company. The estate manager and head of the office was the forest superintendent, who resided in the forest district building. The first building in the mining settlement was the customs office, where tolls were collected for passage through the private territory of the manor. By the first half of 1906, the design for the new housing estate was complete, and a building permit was obtained in June of that year. Construction of the estate for miners employed at the newly established Giesche Coal Mine (now Wieczorek) began in June 1907 with the participation of 1,000–2,000 workers. Construction was completed in 1910, and the first tenants were able to move in as early as 1 October 1908. In the central part of the housing estate, in addition to residential houses, public utility buildings were erected, including: a Catholic elementary school and an Evangelical school, a cooperative store, a post office, an inn, an administrative building for the manor, a forest district office, a bathhouse and laundry, and lodging houses with a canteen. The construction of the housing estate was a pioneering project, as its architecture and urban planning differed from the typical company-sponsored housing estates of that period. The then-director of the company, Anton Uthemann, commissioned the architects Emil and Georg Zillmann from Charlottenburg near Berlin to design and build the housing estate. They modeled the residential district on the garden city concept, which was developed by the English urban planner Ebenezer Howard.

In 1909, the company of Giesche's heirs obtained a concession to build a narrow-gauge railway to the Carmer shaft. On 6 January 1914, permission was granted to operate passenger service on the new railway. It operated until the end of 1977 and was named the Balkan. It ran from Giszowiec to the Albert (Wojciech) shaft in Szopienice, along the present-day Szopienicka Street.

Before World War I, many political and cultural organizations were active in the estate, engaging in intense activities and promoting Polish identity. Among them were four members of the Polish Socialist Party who distributed the Gazeta Robotnicza. The newspaper Górnoślązak was also published in Polish. Another manifestation of patriotic activity was the establishment of a choir named after Frédéric Chopin in the estate, conducted by Wiktor Bara, a well-known cultural activist in Upper Silesia.

During World War I, Giszowiec was not directly attacked by the Russian Empire, but the war had a significant impact on the local community. As early as 2 August 1914, a civil guard was established, and some residents were conscripted into the army and sent to the front. The prolonged hostilities that followed contributed to supply shortages – one of the consequences was a strike at the Giesche Coal Mine on 8–11 November 1916, during which workers demanded higher wages and improved food supplies. A second strike broke out in July 1918, and in response to this event, the mine was militarized. In addition, medical care in Giszowiec was inadequate at the time, which contributed to the outbreak of epidemics – Spanish flu starting in the fall of 1918, and typhus a year later. Sick residents were hospitalized in the then overcrowded infectious disease barracks in Nikiszowiec. The epidemic lasted until January 1920.

=== Silesian Uprisings ===
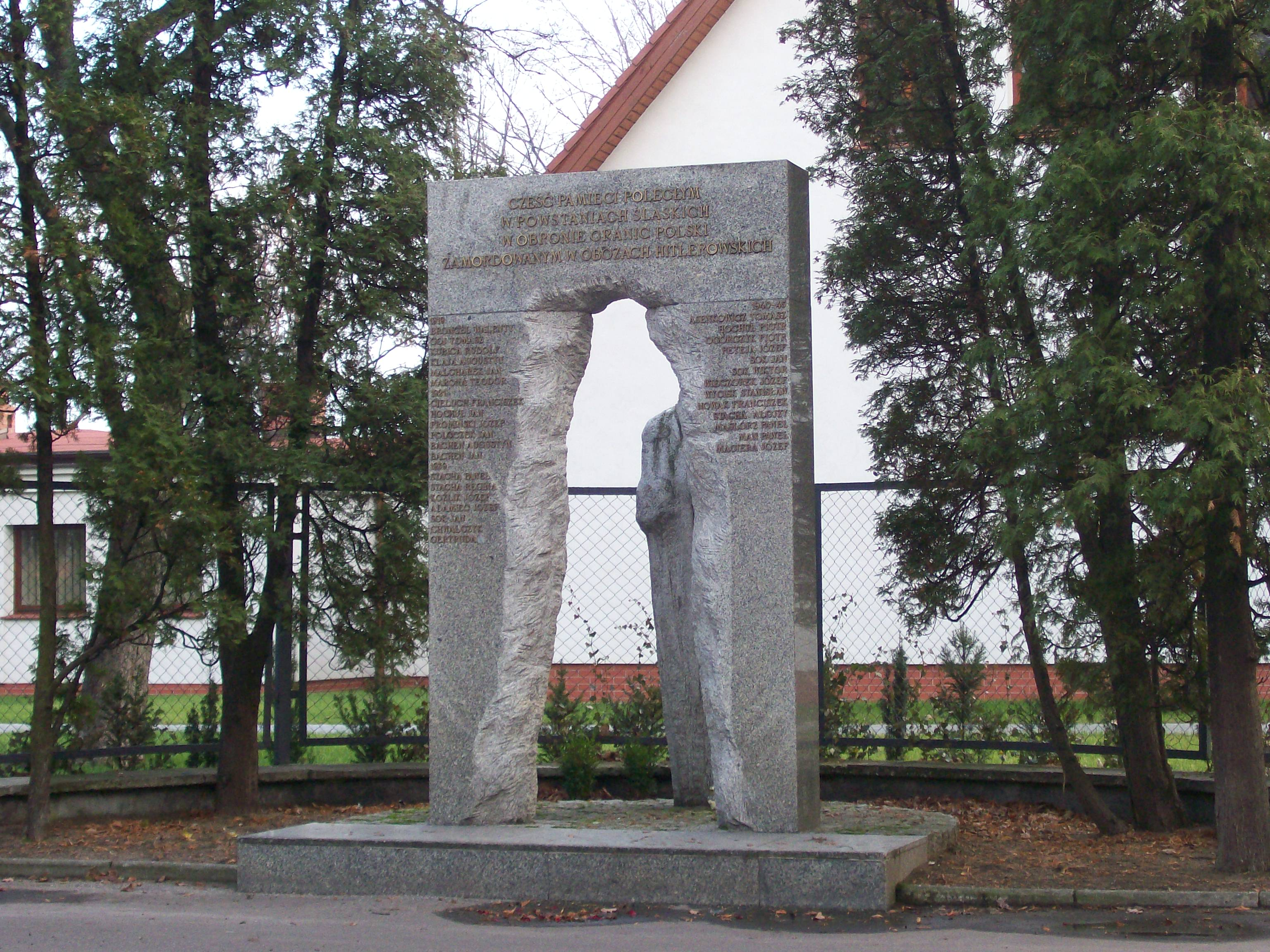
honoring those who died in the Silesian Uprisings and in Nazi camps during World War II, located at Pod Lipami Square in the center of Giszowiec

After the defeat of the German Empire in World War I, most residents of Giszowiec anticipated the annexation of Upper Silesia to Poland. They engaged in various forms of patriotic activity. The Polish Military Organization of Upper Silesia organized clandestine meetings within the estate. Weapons were stockpiled, and homemade grenades were prepared. The Giszowiec branch of the Polish Military Organization had about 60 members, and its commander was Jakub Wójcik. During the three Silesian Uprisings of 1919–1921, the residents of Giszowiec actively worked to have Upper Silesia incorporated into the reborn Polish state.

During the First Silesian Uprising, on 17 August 1919, the unit commander received orders to assemble his troops and launch a surprise attack on a Grenzschutz unit stationed in the outbuildings of the horse-drawn transport depot on the outskirts of the estate, but it was on full combat alert as it was preparing to depart, so the attack was called off. The insurgents were then divided into groups to carry out various tasks. On 20 August 1919, a unit of insurgents repelled a German attack on Mysłowice, thereby enabling the withdrawal of insurgent units into Polish territory. Giszowiec itself, however, was captured by German troops on the same day. Six residents were killed during the First Silesian Uprising. After these events, due to German suspicions of possible future uprisings, they reinforced their forces in areas particularly at risk. In October 1919, the headquarters of a German regiment that had arrived in the region was located in Giszowiec. After the First Silesian Uprising, Polish patriotic and social organizations also developed in Giszowiec, such as the Lutnia Singing Association, the Siła Association, and a theater club.

During the Second Silesian Uprising, Giszowiec remained in the hands of the insurgents. According to a report from 21 August 1920, the insurgents disarmed a German police station. Later, for the next few days, they limited themselves to patrolling the area, and some of them formed a Citizens' Guard, led by Jakub Wójcik. On 23 August 1920, there were reports of a concentration of German troops in the forests between Piotrowice, Murcki, and Giszowiec. After the fall of the Second Silesian Uprising, the insurgents hid their weapons, and later, among other things, a second weapons airdrop was carried out from Sosnowiec.

On 20 March 1921, in the plebiscite held in Upper Silesia – in Giszowiec and Nikiszowiec – 4,288 people were eligible to vote, and 4,222 cast their ballots. 3,056 people voted in favor of joining Poland. Preparations for this plebiscite in Giszowiec were handled by the Polish Plebiscite Committee, headed by Jan Bartosz. Voting took place at three polling stations.

During the Third Silesian Uprising, the Polish Military Organization units from Giszowiec were organized into the 5th and 6th Companies of the 3rd Silesian Insurgent Regiment under the command of Jan Gałka and Franciszek Koźlik. At that time, they disarmed the Germans serving in the plebiscite police and took control of the telephone lines. Both Giszowiec companies later received orders to participate in the capture of Katowice, which took place on the night of 2 to 3 May 1921. This operation was carried out without casualties. Soon, the uprising command ordered a withdrawal from the largest Upper Silesian cities and the commencement of their blockade, in which the Giszowiec insurgents also participated. On 26 May 1921, insurgents from Giszowiec set out for the front lines of the Battle of Annaberg. They fought in the area of Zalesie, Lichynia, Ujazd, Sławięcice, and Gogolin. The insurgents returned to Giszowiec on 4 July 1921. Twelve fighters from Giszowiec fell in the uprising battles for Upper Silesia to remain part of Poland. The 1970 census lists 315 names of participants in the Silesian Uprisings who resided in Giszowiec at the time.

=== Second Polish Republic ===
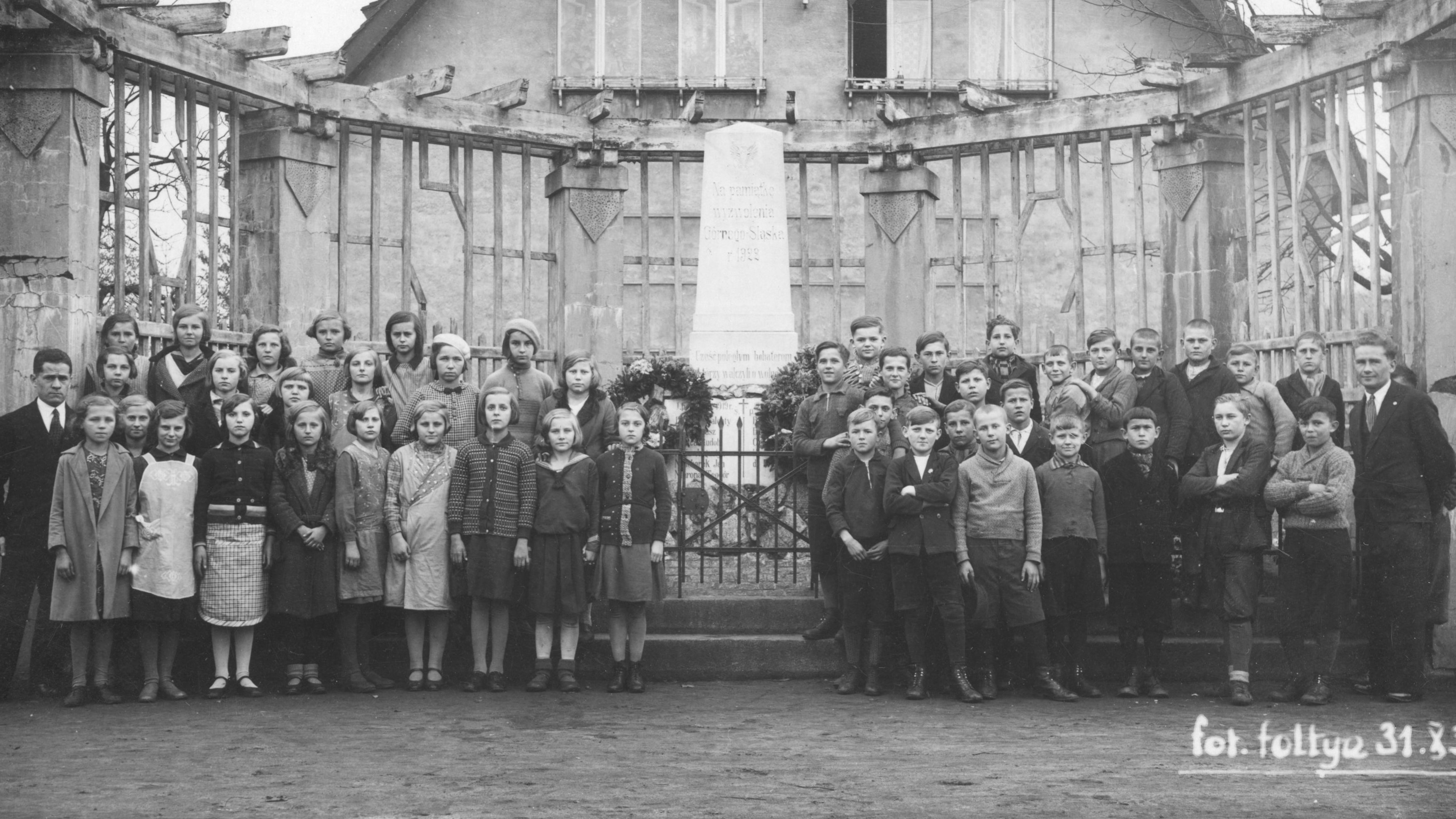
Elementary school students in front of the obelisk dedicated to the Silesian insurgents at the present-day Pod Lipami Square in 1934

Under the terms of the German–Polish Convention regarding Upper Silesia concluded in Geneva, Giszowiec became part of the Second Polish Republic in May 1922. This marked the beginning of the Polonization of public life, including the renaming of places to Polish names: the name of the estate was changed from Gieschewald to Giszowiec, and streets named after German officials and builders responsible for the estate's construction were renamed after figures from the Polish pantheon or by Polonizing existing names. There were also demands to remove the statue of Otto von Bismarck from the town hall building. At that time, Polish life was flourishing and many social organizations were active, including the Sokół Polish Gymnastic Society, the Chopin Singing Society, and the Polish Scouting and Guiding Association. Until 1924, Giszowiec was an independent estate – it was then incorporated into Gmina Janów after the dissolution of manorial estates. This led to many complications between the Giesche company, which owned the Giszowiec lands, and Gmina Janów authorities regarding issues such as the costs of maintaining roads, public facilities, and fire protection. The dispute was partially resolved by an agreement of 12 February 1926, which stipulated that, pending a final resolution of the disputes, the costs of maintaining public facilities would be split equally.

After the redrawing of borders and the subsequent division of the Georg von Giesches Erben group's facilities, the Giesche joint-stock company was established in 1922. Due to a deterioration in the financial situation, a decision was made in 1926 to enter into an agreement with American businesspeople, leading to the establishment of the Silesian-American Corporation. The management of the company also changed – an American, George Sage Brooks, became the director. Americans also took on other important positions, which necessitated their relocation to Poland along with their entire families. To this end, between 1927 and 1928, a colony of six English-style villas was built on the present-day Górniczego Stanu Street, and in 1935, a community center was constructed. Education was also organized for the children of American officials.

In the 1930s, the Great Depression caused the mining industry to decline, leading to a rise in unemployment. Strikes at the Giesche Coal Mine were organized on 2–8 February 1932, 3–4 March 1933, and 25–27 November 1935. At the same time, the phenomenon of illegal coal mining in bootleg mines developed. By the end of September 1932, 203 bootleg mines had been shut down on land belonging to the Giesche company. Despite an improvement in the economic situation, a sit-down strike broke out at the Giesche Coal Mine on 15 March 1937, which was the last major protest by Upper Silesian workers before the outbreak of World War II. The strike ended on 23 March 1937. At that time, the miners secured higher wages, lower work quotas in the coal faces, and a reduction in the number of shifts. Images from the strikes of that period are depicted in the film Pearl in the Crown by Kazimierz Kutz. The organizer of the local revolutionary movement and one of the leading communist activists in Upper Silesia was Józef Wieczorek, a miner at the Giesche Coal Mine who was living in Giszowiec at the time.

=== World War II ===
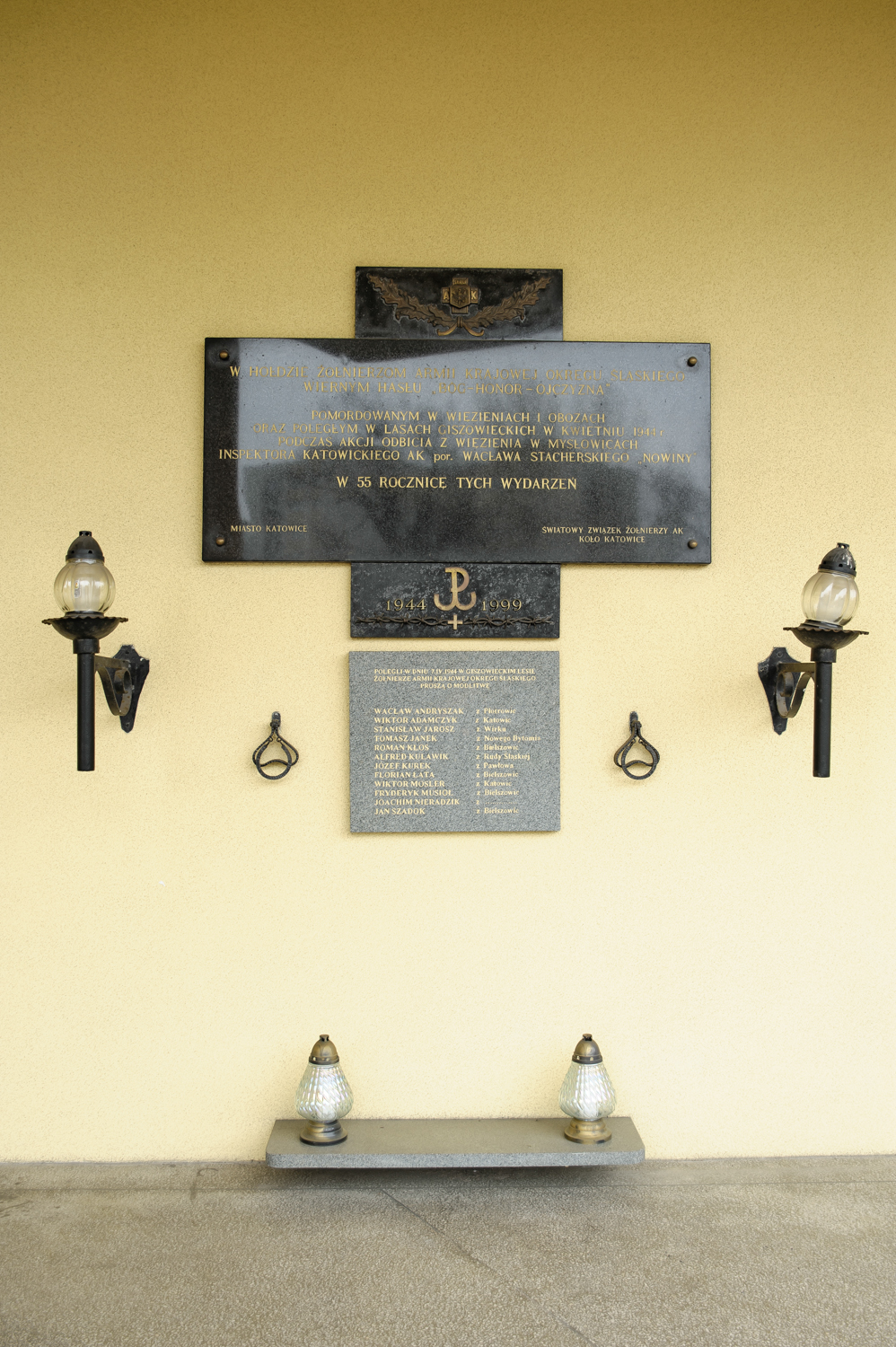
Plaque commemorating the soldiers of the Home Army murdered in April 1944 in the Giszowiec forests

On 4 September 1939, as a result of the Third Reich's invasion of Poland, Giszowiec came under German occupation. The occupiers began persecuting Polish patriots, including former Silesian insurgents and Polish activists, some of whom died in concentration camps. All traces of Polish identity were eradicated – the occupiers and Volksdeutsche removed books from Polish libraries, tore down and destroyed Polish inscriptions, symbols (including the obelisk unveiled in 1925 in honor of the Silesian insurgents), and national emblems. The Polish school system was also abolished, and a German school was opened on 1 February 1940. During the war, Fritz Bracht – Gauleiter and Chief Administrator of the Province of Upper Silesia – lived in the villa of the Giesche Coal Mine director. The changes also affected the Giesche joint-stock company – in September 1939, it came under German receivership. All Polish administrative staff were also dismissed.

Underground cells from various political circles began to form in Giszowiec and the surrounding area. Groups affiliated with the Union of Armed Struggle, which later became the Home Army, began their activities. In addition, miners associated with the Polish Socialist Party and local communists were also active. These organizations carried out sabotage and subversion activities (including distributing leaflets, damaging mining machinery, and assisting prisoners of war working in the mine). On 7 April 1944, during an operation to rescue Katowice Home Army Inspector Lieutenant Wacław Stacherski, codenamed Nowina, from the prison in Mysłowice, the Katowice Gestapo murdered an entire partisan unit in the forests of Giszowiec. In memory of the murdered partisans, a plaque commemorating these events was placed in the Church of St. Barbara in Giszowiec. Jews were also hidden in Giszowiec – from October 1943 until the end of the occupation, the family of Franciszek and Franciszka Gburek provided shelter to five Jews who had escaped from the Sosnowiec Ghetto. This family received the title of Righteous Among the Nations in 1985. The German authorities left Giszowiec on 25 January 1945, and a Volkssturm unit remained in the estate. The next day, this unit came under fire from Soviet aircraft and withdrew toward Murcki. More than five years later, on the morning of 27 January 1945, Giszowiec, along with Katowice, was liberated from German occupation and captured by the Red Army, and the commander of the 59th Army, General Ivan Korovnikov, established his command post in the estate.

=== Period of the Polish People's Republic ===
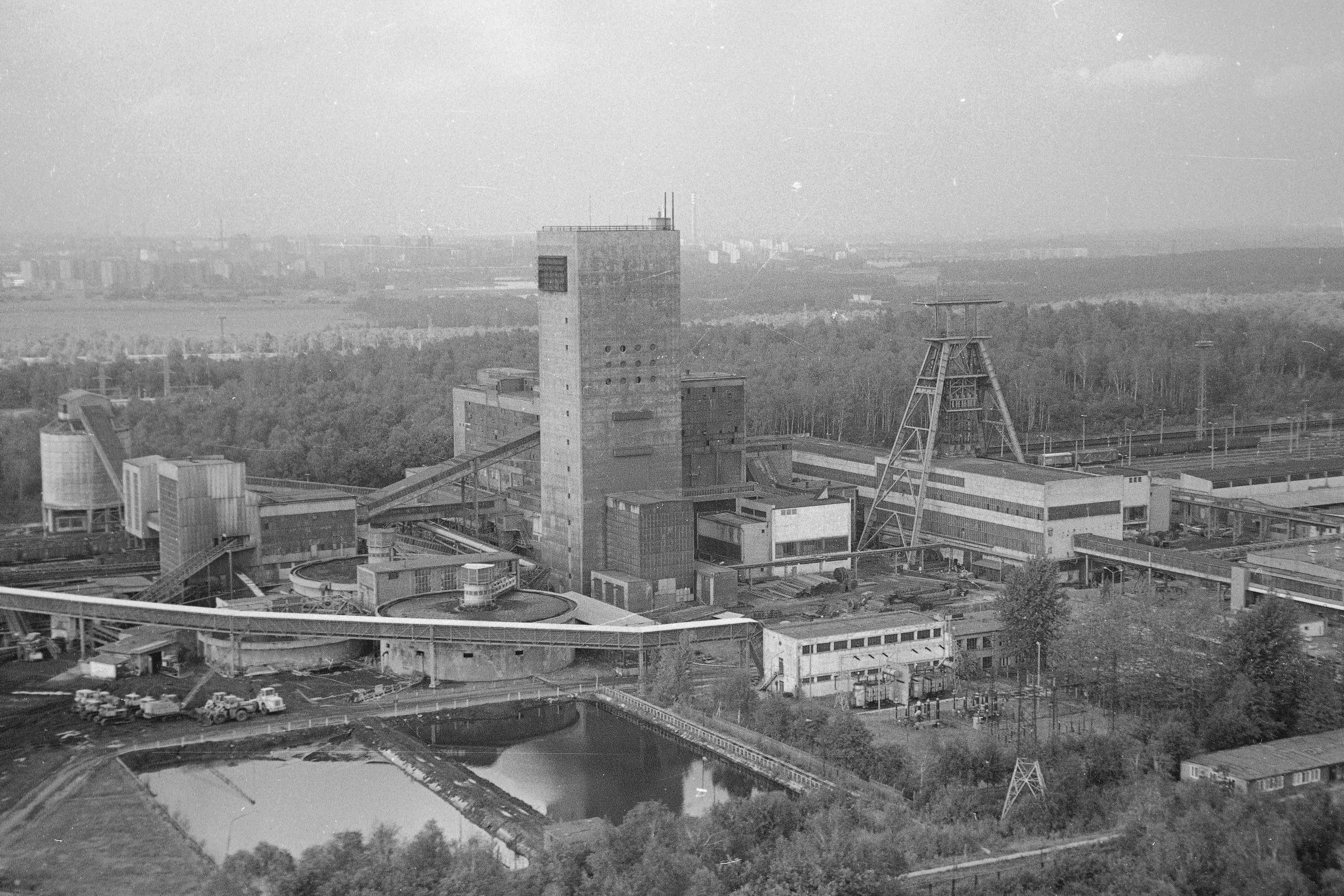
Staszic Coal Mine in 1974; coal mining had begun there 10 years earlier

After the Red Army captured Giszowiec on 27 January 1945, work began on establishing a new administration, in which communist activists began to play the most important role. On the same day, a temporary order committee was organized, and the communist activist Franciszek Żymła became the head of Gmina Janów. Efforts were also made to re-Polonize public life – Polish street names were restored, and on the present-day Pod Lipami Square, in place of the monument to the Silesian insurgents demolished by the Germans, a symbolic plaque was erected commemorating the Silesian insurgents and the victims of World War II from Giszowiec. Until 1 April 1951, Giszowiec was part of Gmina Janów, and later, until 31 December 1959, it belonged to the Szopienice urban county, at which time both Giszowiec and Szopienice became part of Katowice.

On 6 February 1945, mining operations resumed at the Giesche Coal Mine. The mine itself was nationalized at that time – the facility became part of the Central Coal Industry Union on 31 January 1945, and on 3 March of the same year, it was incorporated into the Katowice Coal Industry Union. The mine was also renamed, first to "Janów", and then, on 1 October 1946, to "Wieczorek". In 1964, coal mining in Giszowiec began at a new facility – the Staszic Coal Mine – which was located near the housing estate. Initially, 621 workers from Giszowiec and the surrounding area were employed there, and their numbers continued to grow.

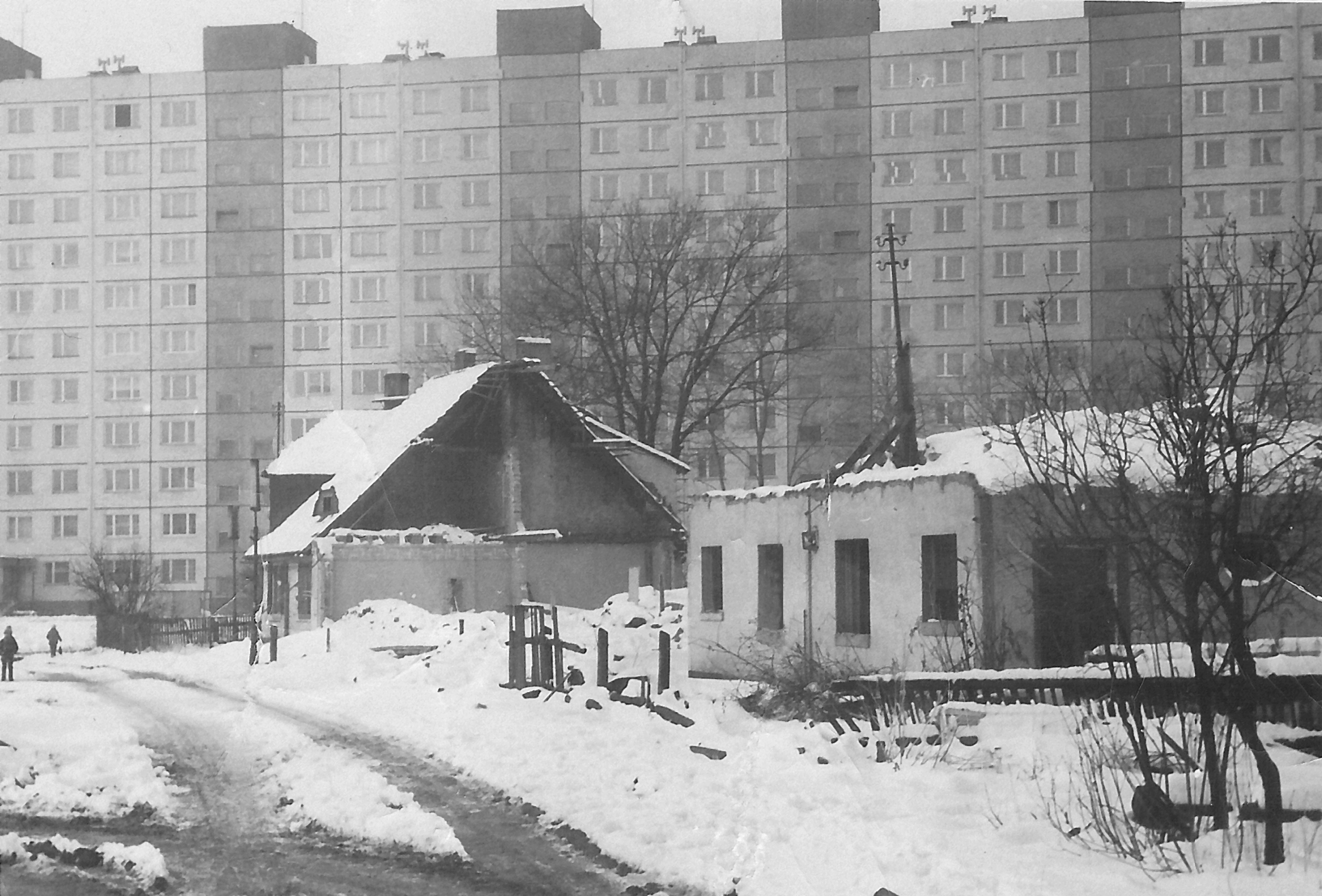
Historic buildings of Giszowiec in the 1970s, being demolished to make way for new multi-family housing

To provide housing for an ever-growing number of miners, a decision was made in 1969 to demolish the historic Giszowiec and build a housing estate in its place, consisting of 10-story high-rises. During this period, on 15 November 1979, the district was renamed the Stanisław Staszic Housing Estate. The demolitions were halted following decisions by the conservator of monuments on 18 August 1978 and 23 June 1987 to enter the urban and spatial layout of the housing estate into the Registry of Cultural Property of the Katowice Voivodeship. This saved only one-third of the historic buildings from destruction. The demolition of unique miners' houses in the 1970s became the main theme of the film Paciorki jednego różańca, directed by Kazimierz Kutz.

On 18 September 1981, a group of 12 young people from Giszowiec, aged 16 to 22, hijacked an An-24 aircraft of LOT Polish Airlines and flew it to Berlin Tempelhof Airport. The plane was on a sightseeing flight from Katowice to Warsaw.

Dramatic events unfolded at the Staszic Coal Mine on the night martial law was declared (12–13 December 1981) – members of the Solidarity trade union broke into the mine and organized a sit-in strike. The plant director announced the militarization of the facility, prompting the strike committee to decide the following day to end the protests out of fear of a brutal crackdown. Some people continued the strike. On 15 December, the mine was pacified by Motorized Reserves of the Citizens' Militia and mechanized vehicles. 156 miners were interned in the mine and nearby workers' hotels.

=== Period after 1989 ===
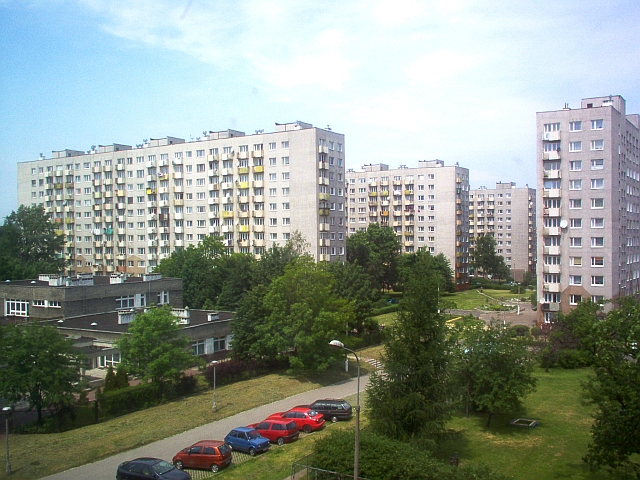
Apartment buildings on Wojciech Street in 2006; at that time, these buildings had not yet undergone thermal modernization

In 1989, landmark events took place in Poland that also influenced developments in Giszowiec. In the first post-1989 elections to the Katowice City Council, held on 27 May 1990, four council members residing in Giszowiec were elected. One of the first decisions of the new council was to restore the name of the district from the Stanisław Staszic Housing Estate to the Giszowiec Housing Estate by resolution of 8 October 1990. In early 1992, 22 auxiliary units were established in Katowice, including Unit No. 17 Giszowiec. At the initiative of the residents of Giszowiec, the Council of Auxiliary Unit No. 17 was established, and its charter was adopted on 30 July 2014. The first elections took place on 1 March 2015, and the first session on 14 April of the same year.

The restructuring of the coal mining industry in Giszowiec has been ongoing since 1989. On 1 January 2010, the Staszic Coal Mine was merged with the Murcki Coal Mine to form the Murcki-Staszic Coal Mine, while on 31 March 2018, due to the depletion of coal deposits, the liquidation process of the Wieczorek Coal Mine began. It was then transferred to the management of the Mine Restructuring Company. On 1 January 2021, the Murcki-Staszic Coal Mine was merged with the Wujek Coal Mine, creating an enterprise named the Staszic-Wujek Coal Mine, and on 1 April 2026, it was once again transformed into the Murcki-Staszic Coal Mine.

In 1998, the Staszic Coal Mine transferred the buildings in the historic part of Giszowiec to the city of Katowice. Some of the buildings were later sold to the families living in them. The entire surviving housing stock of the estate is under the care of the historic preservation authority. New housing was also built by the Katowice Social Housing Association, which blends architecturally with the historic buildings of Giszowiec – the Kasztany estate, located between Pod Kasztanami and Kosmiczna streets and built between 2003 and 2004, the Pod Kasztanami housing estate, built on Górniczego Stanu Street between 2017 and 2019, and the Przyjazny Zakątek housing estate, located on Przyjazna Street and completed in February 2023.

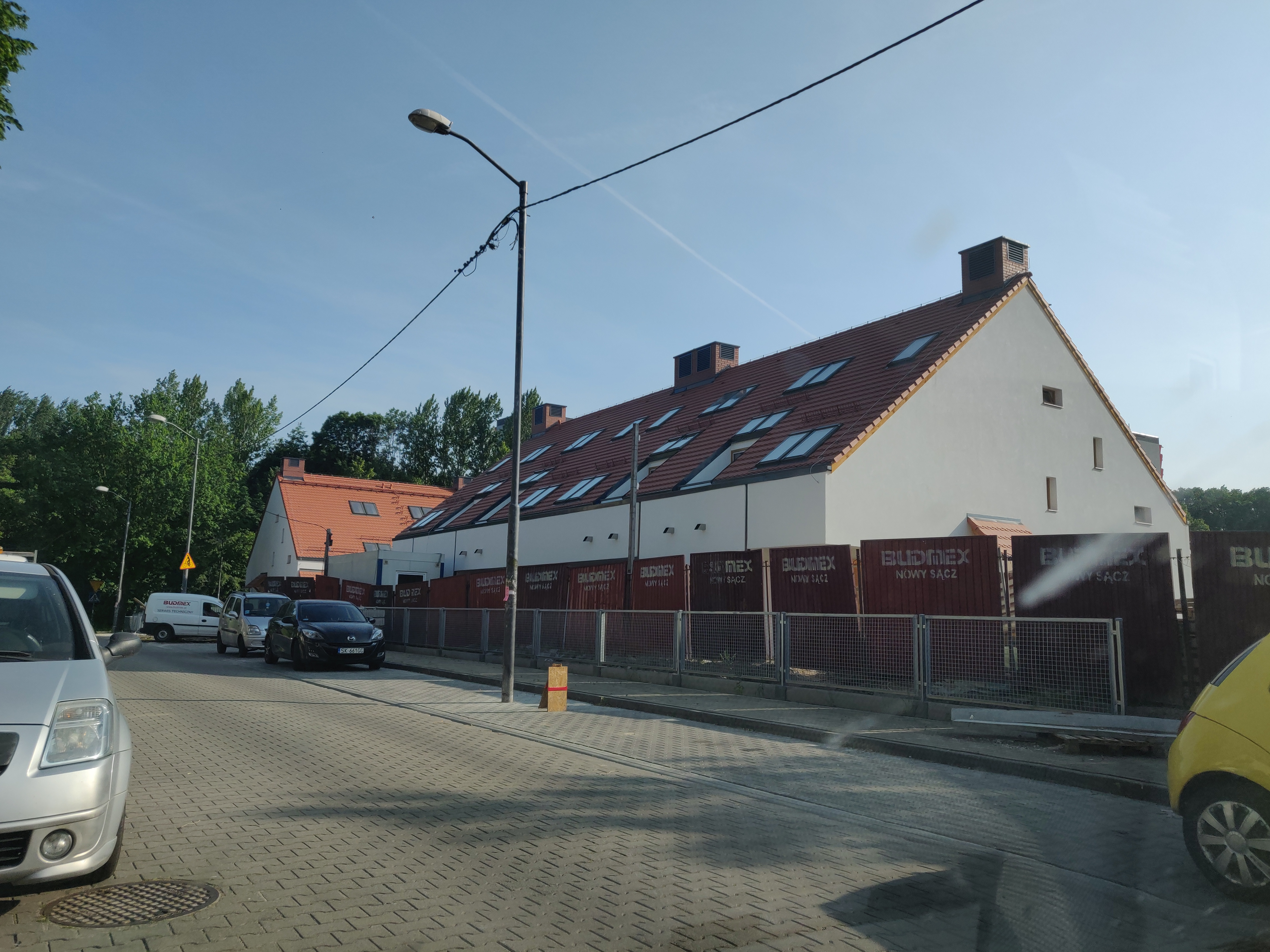
Pod Kasztanami housing estate under construction in June 2019

During this period, administrative changes were also made in the education system – Primary School No. 51 began classes at its new location at 7 Przyjazna Street on 12 October 1993, Primary School No. 52 ceased to exist in 2004 with the closure of Junior High School No. 15, which had been established in the school building, and a new sports hall was opened at Primary School No. 54 in September 2014. During that period, on 23 October 1994, the parish Church of St. Barbara was also solemnly consecrated.

The historic part of the Giszowiec housing estate has become a tourist attraction for the city of Katowice and the entire Silesian Voivodeship. On 19 October 2006, the grand opening of the Silesian Industrial Monuments Route took place at the Tyskie Brewing Museum. Information boards detailing the sites along the trail were installed in downtown Katowice and at the Silesia City Center. One of the sites on the route is Giszowiec. On 12 June 2010, Giszowiec was one of the venues where the first edition of the Industrial Monuments Route festival – Industriada – was co-organized.

In 2017, work began on the plans to reconstruct the junction of national roads 81 and 86 in Giszowiec, along with the reconstruction of the intersection of national road 81 (Tadeusz Kościuszko Street) and Armii Krajowej Street, with the aim of improving traffic flow at "bottlenecks" in Katowice. Preparatory work for the reconstruction of the road junction began in June 2018, and the final section of the reconstructed junction in Giszowiec was opened to traffic on 7 July 2022. At that time, a section of the roadway in the area of Kolista Street was put into service.

== Demography ==
Population structure in Giszowiec by gender and age (as of 31 December 2015)
Period/Number of inhabitants	pre-working age(0–18 years)	working age(18–60/65 years)	post-working age(over 60/65 years)	Total
Total	2,547	10,775	3,459	16,781
women	1,229	5,105	2,294	8,628
men	1,318	5,670	1,165	8,153
Femininity ratio	93	90	197	106

The earliest data on the population of the present-day Giszowiec date back to the time when the estate was built. The first residents moved in on 1 October 1908. In December 1909, Giszowiec had a population of 3,414, while in the fall of 1910, the population was approximately 4,000. When building the estate, the owners of the company Georg von Giesches Erben planned to bring in new residents from the interior of Germany, but there were very few willing to move there, so they agreed to accept Upper Silesian workers, who came mainly from Wesoła, Murcki, Załęże, and Katowice. The working-class population was of Polish origin and spoke the Silesian language, while officials communicated in German. After World War II, there was a very large increase in the number of residents, caused by the construction of new multi-family buildings starting in the 1970s in connection with the establishment of the Staszic Coal Mine. At that time, an estate was designed with a target capacity of 22,440 residents. Since the 1990s, a decline in the number of residents has been recorded in Giszowiec.

As of December 2007, Giszowiec had a population of 18,475 (5.9% of the city's total population), of whom 13,300 lived in the buildings of the former Staszic housing estate and 2,900 in Osiedle Adama. At that time, Giszowiec was the fifth most populous district of Katowice (after Śródmieście, Ligota-Panewniki, Piotrowice-Ochojec, and Osiedle Tysiąclecia). The average population density at that time was 1,536 people/km² and was lower than the average for Katowice as a whole – 1,916 people/km².

In terms of age structure, in 1988, 21,097 people lived in Giszowiec, with the 0–14, 15–29, and 30–44 age groups predominating in roughly equal proportions. At that time, a very low proportion of people over 60 was recorded, which distinguished Giszowiec, along with Osiedle Witosa and Osiedle Tysiąclecia, from the rest of Katowice. As of 31 December 2004, 18,572 people lived in Giszowiec, of whom 9,351 were women and 9,221 were men. Among the age groups, the largest number of residents at that time were of working age (6,523 women and 6,784 men). In 2007, the population was 18,475, and in terms of age structure, the smallest group at that time was the 0–14 age group, while the dominant age groups were 45–59 and 15–29.

Sources: 1909 (December); 1910; 1936; 1988; 1997; 2005; 2010; 2015; 2019.

Population projections developed in 2007 estimated Giszowiec's population under the pessimistic scenario at 18,244 people in 2010 (100.2% of the 2007 figure), 17,929 people in 2020 (98.6%), and 16,296 people in 2030 (89.6%). Under the optimistic scenario, the population of Giszowiec was estimated at 18,269 people (100.4% of the 2007 figure), 18,194 people in 2020 (nearly 100%), and 16,829 people in 2030 (92.5%).

== Politics and administration ==
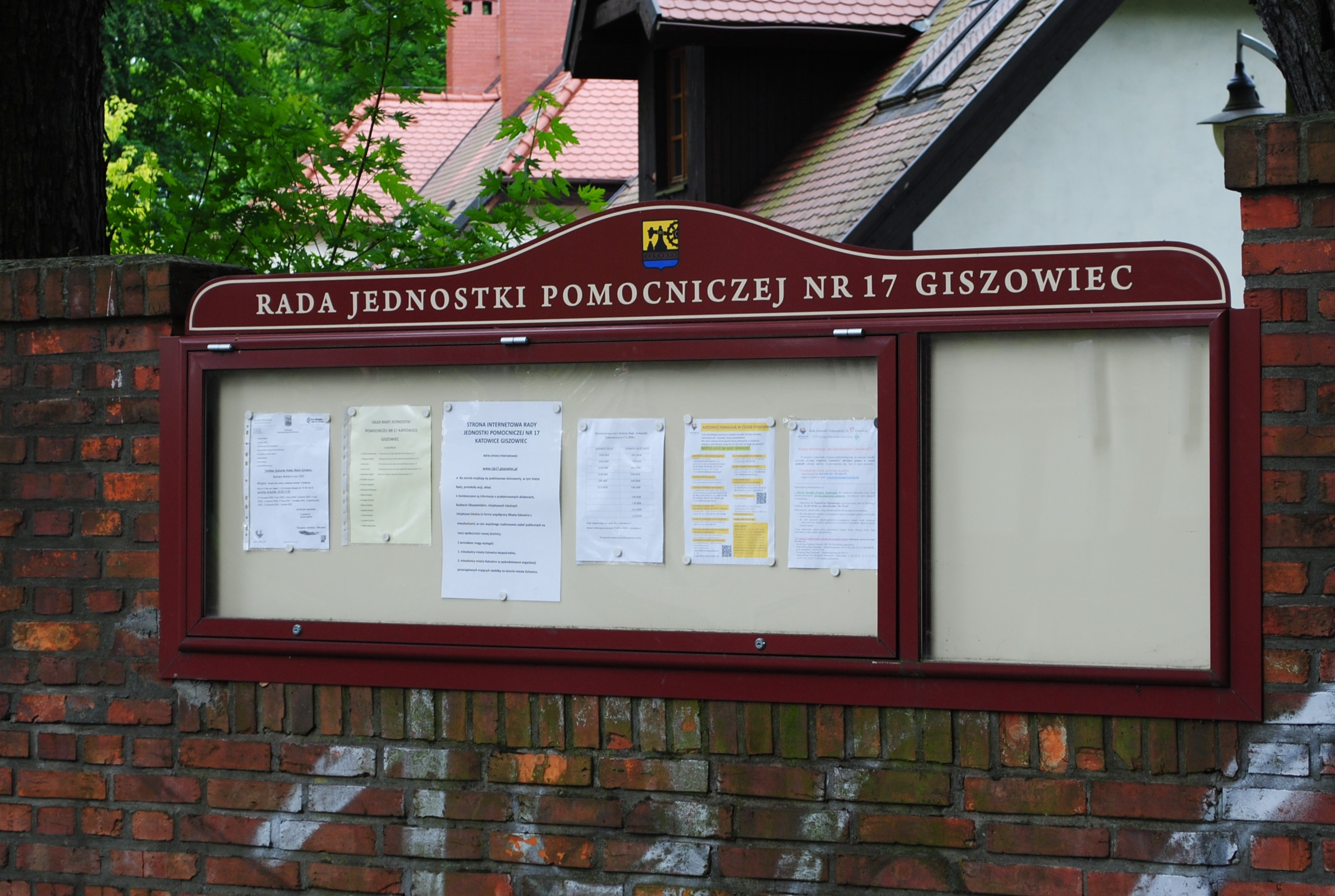
Notice board of the former Local Council No. 17 in Giszowiec (2020)

Until the 19th century, the Giszowiec area belonged to the Mieroszewski family of the Ślepowron coat of arms. The majorat, encompassing, among other areas, the territory of present-day Giszowiec, was established on 26 November 1678. Aleksander Mieroszewski – the last heir of the Mieroszewski family – converted the entire estate into a monetary majorat on 11 May 1839, along with the right to use the title of entailor. At that time, the majorat passed into the possession of Franz von Winckler. After 1853, the area passed into the hands of the daughter Waleska, who married Hubert von Tiele-Winckler. The Tiele-Winckler family sold the estate on 9 May 1899 to the Georg von Giesches Erben company. Administratively, the Giszowiec area was then part of the Mysłowice-Zamek manorial district, which was a part of Oppeln in the Province of Silesia of the Kingdom of Prussia and, from 1873, of the Katowice County. In the deed of purchase for the Reserve mining field and the surrounding lands on which the Giszowiec settlement was built, Georg von Giesches Erben reserved the right to set aside these lands for the establishment of an independent manorial district. Thus, starting in 1905, efforts were made to designate a new manorial area, the lands of which would be entirely under the jurisdiction of the company.

The Giszowiec manor area (German: Gutsbezirk Gieschewald) was established on 1 July 1907. On 1 April 1909, the southern areas of Gmina Bogucice (including the Amanda Colony) were incorporated into the manor district, and many corrections and exchanges of parcels were made – the areas of the present-day Valley of Three Ponds and the Katowice-Muchowiec Airfield were transferred to the manor district in Katowice. A new administrative district, Giszowiec (German: Amtsbezirk Gieschewald), was also established, to which the Giszowiec manor area was subordinate. The establishment of this district administratively separated Giszowiec from Mysłowice.

After World War I, on 15 May 1922, Giszowiec was incorporated into Poland and became part of the autonomous Silesian Voivodeship. It was annexed to the Katowice County. Until 1924, Giszowiec remained a separate manor district with its own administration. The administrative building was located at the present-day Pod Lipami Square. At that time, due to the dissolution of independent manor districts, it was incorporated into the rural Gmina Janów. In the early stages of World War II, on 8 October 1939, Giszowiec, along with all of Upper Silesia and the Dąbrowa Basin, was incorporated into the Third Reich, into the Province of Silesia, and into the Katowice Regency, which was established on 26 October 1939. During the occupation, the seat of Gmina Janów was moved to Giszowiec, and the gmina itself was renamed Gieschewald on 3 February 1942. After World War II, Giszowiec returned to Poland. By virtue of the Regulation of the Council of Ministers of 1 April 1951, which abolished the Katowice County, Gmina Janów, in which Giszowiec was located, was incorporated into the Szopienice urban county, and on 31 December 1959, Giszowiec was incorporated into Katowice, becoming one of its districts. On 16 September 1991, the Katowice City Council adopted a resolution under which, on 1 January 1992, the city was divided into auxiliary local government units (districts), including Unit No. 17, Giszowiec. On 29 September 1997, the Katowice City Council adopted a new division of the city into auxiliary local government units, designating Giszowiec as the 17th auxiliary unit within the group of eastern districts, while simultaneously defining its exact boundaries.

District Council No. 17 operates in Giszowiec, and its first charter was adopted on 25 November 2021. The District Council consists of 15 members elected for a 4-year term. The executive body of the council is the District Executive Board. The District Council's headquarters are located at the Szopienice-Giszowiec Municipal Cultural Center at 1 Pod Lipami Square. The chairwoman of the District Council for the second term (2019–2022) is Urszula Machowska, while the chairwoman of the Executive Board is Maria Ryś.

In elections to the Katowice City Council, Giszowiec is part of District No. 2, along with the districts of Dąbrówka Mała, Szopienice-Burowiec, and Janów-Nikiszowiec. Between 2006 and 2010, this district had five representatives on the City Council. For the 2018 local elections, voting within the district's boundaries took place at polling stations No. 54, 55, 56, 57, 58, 59, 60, and 61. Between 1989 and 2017, nine council members from Giszowiec served on the Katowice City Council: Grażyna Szymborska, Jerzy Forajter, Kazimierz Wzorek, Aniceta Toporek, Andrzej Tomczyk, Krzysztof Marek, Piotr Hyla, Dariusz Łyczko, and Maria Sokół. Two members of the Sejm also came from Giszowiec: Maria Trzcińska-Fajfrowska (2nd term) and Bożena Borys-Szopa (8th and 9th terms).

The residential buildings in Giszowiec are mainly managed by three housing cooperatives. The largest of these in terms of the number of residents is the Katowice Housing Cooperative – Giszowiec Housing Estate Administration. In April 2020, 7,040 people lived there in 45 buildings located on Gościnna, Miła, Karliczka, Wojciech, and Mysłowicka streets. From among them, the Housing Estate Council is democratically elected as a body of the Katowice Housing Cooperative.

== Economy ==
=== Industry ===
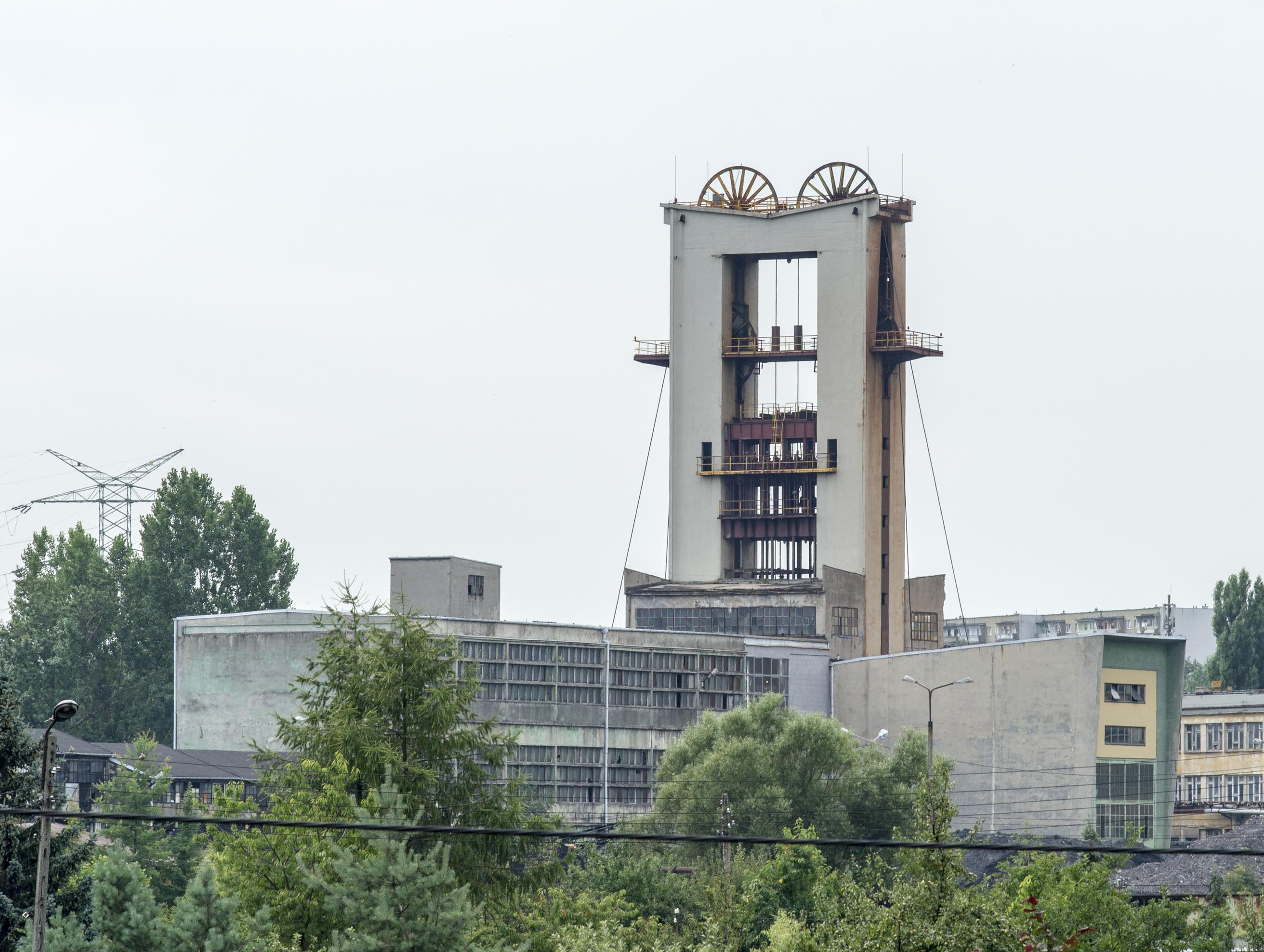
Roździeński shaft tower of the Wieczorek Coal Mine in 2013; demolished in 2024

Giszowiec, a company-sponsored housing estate closely linked to mining, was built for the employees of the Giesche Coal Mine (now Wieczorek). The first mentions of coal mining in the present-day district date back to 1788, when Feliks Mieroszewski, the heir to the Mysłowice estate, founded the Bergthal Coal Mine, the first in the region. Coal was mined there intermittently from 20 December 1788 to 1823. Approximately 140 tons of coal were extracted in the mine's final year of operation. In 1896, the site of the former mine was incorporated into the newly established Reserve field, which served as a reserve mining area for the Giesche Coal Mine. In 1956, demand for coal increased – it was then that attention turned to the reserves in the Reserve field, and it was decided to build a separate mine. Earlier, in 1952, the Giszowiec shaft was launched in the northeastern part of the district, and in 1964, the Roździeński shaft in the eastern part, both of which were part of the Wieczorek Coal Mine. These measures, along with organizational changes, led to an increase in production – by 1975, it had reached nearly 3.3 million tons per year. On 20 July 1964, a new facility – the Staszic Coal Mine – began operations, becoming the largest production plant in Giszowiec. A new mining area, Giszowiec, covering almost 12 million square meters, was established for this purpose. The first shafts began to be sunk in 1959, and construction of administrative buildings began that same year, with completion on 10 December 1960. After ten years of operation, the mine reached its target output of 10,000 tons per day in 1974. At that time, it employed 5,500 workers.

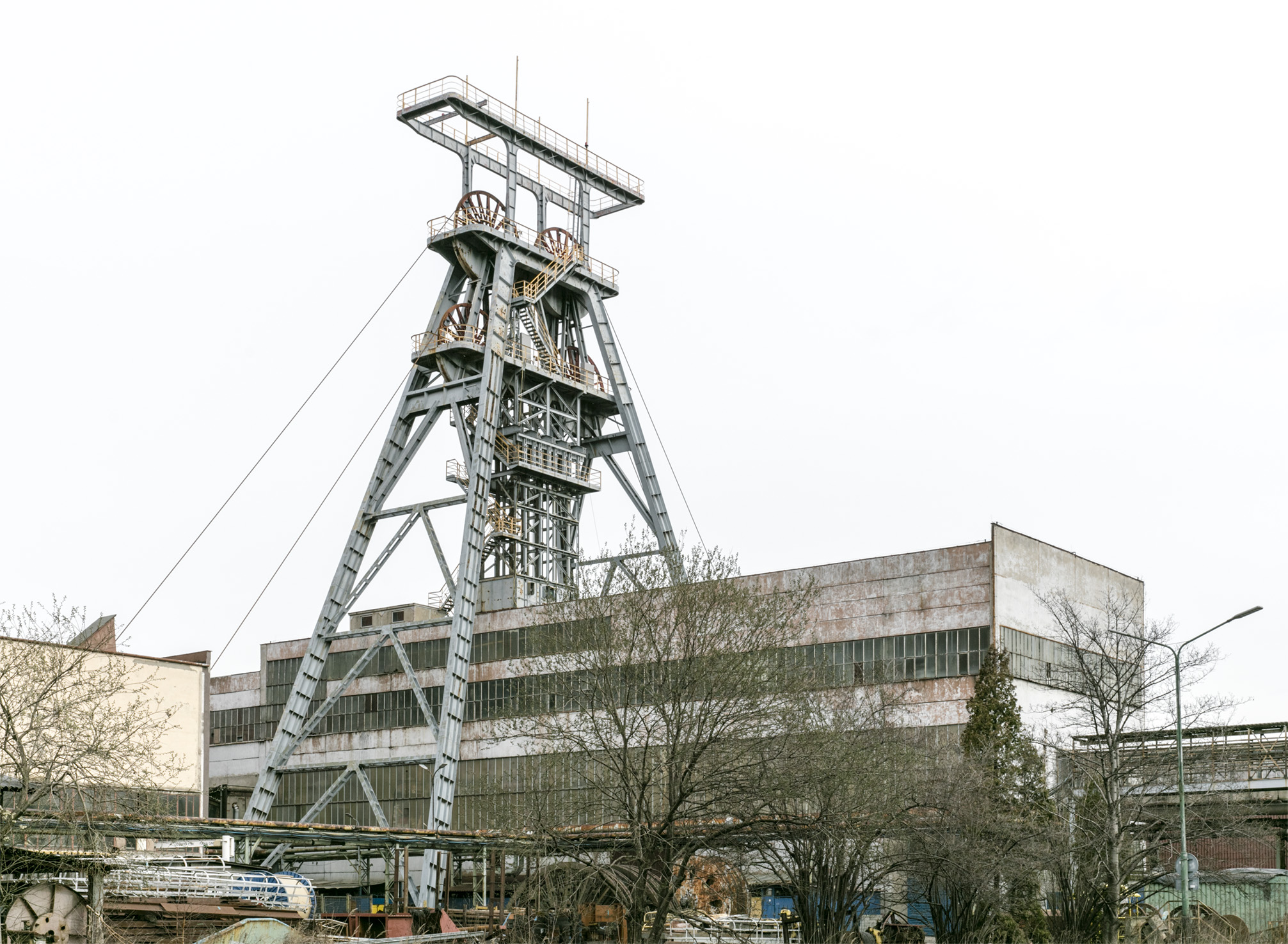
Staszic shaft of the Staszic Coal Mine (2016)

After 1989, the economy underwent restructuring, including the coal mining industry. At that time, some mine divisions were transformed into separate companies, production at the mines was scaled back, and the workforce was reduced. In 2004, the Wieczorek Coal Mine produced 1.7 million tons of coal, and in 2003, the Staszic Coal Mine produced 3.4 million tons of coal. To reduce administrative and operating costs, as of 1 January 2010, the Staszic Coal Mine was merged with the Murcki Coal Mine to form the Murcki-Staszic Coal Mine. Due to the depletion of its coal reserves, the Wieczorek Coal Mine entered liquidation on 31 March 2018. It was also incorporated into the Mine Restructuring Company. In December 2020, a decision was made to merge the Murcki-Staszic Coal Mine with the Wujek Coal Mine, establishing the Staszic-Wujek Coal Mine on 1 January 2021. The Murcki section was liquidated. On 1 April 2026, the Wujek section was transferred to the Coal Mine in Liquidation division, and with this, the Staszic-Wujek mine was transformed into the Murcki-Staszic facility.

InIn addition to the mining industry, other economic sectors have developed in Giszowiec, including companies related to the construction industry. The office of the Silesian Regional Chamber of Civil Engineers, a professional association of civil engineers, is located at 1b Adam Street. The Górażdże concrete plant is also located there, with its facility next to the Staszic Coal Mine, at 1 Karolinka Street. Other companies operating in the construction industry are also present. In addition, the paint manufacturer Tajchem Kozik Grupa has its sales office in Giszowiec at 105 Górniczego Stanu Street, and the Polish Pharmaceutical Group has one of its distribution centers at 5 Kolista Street.

=== Retail and services ===
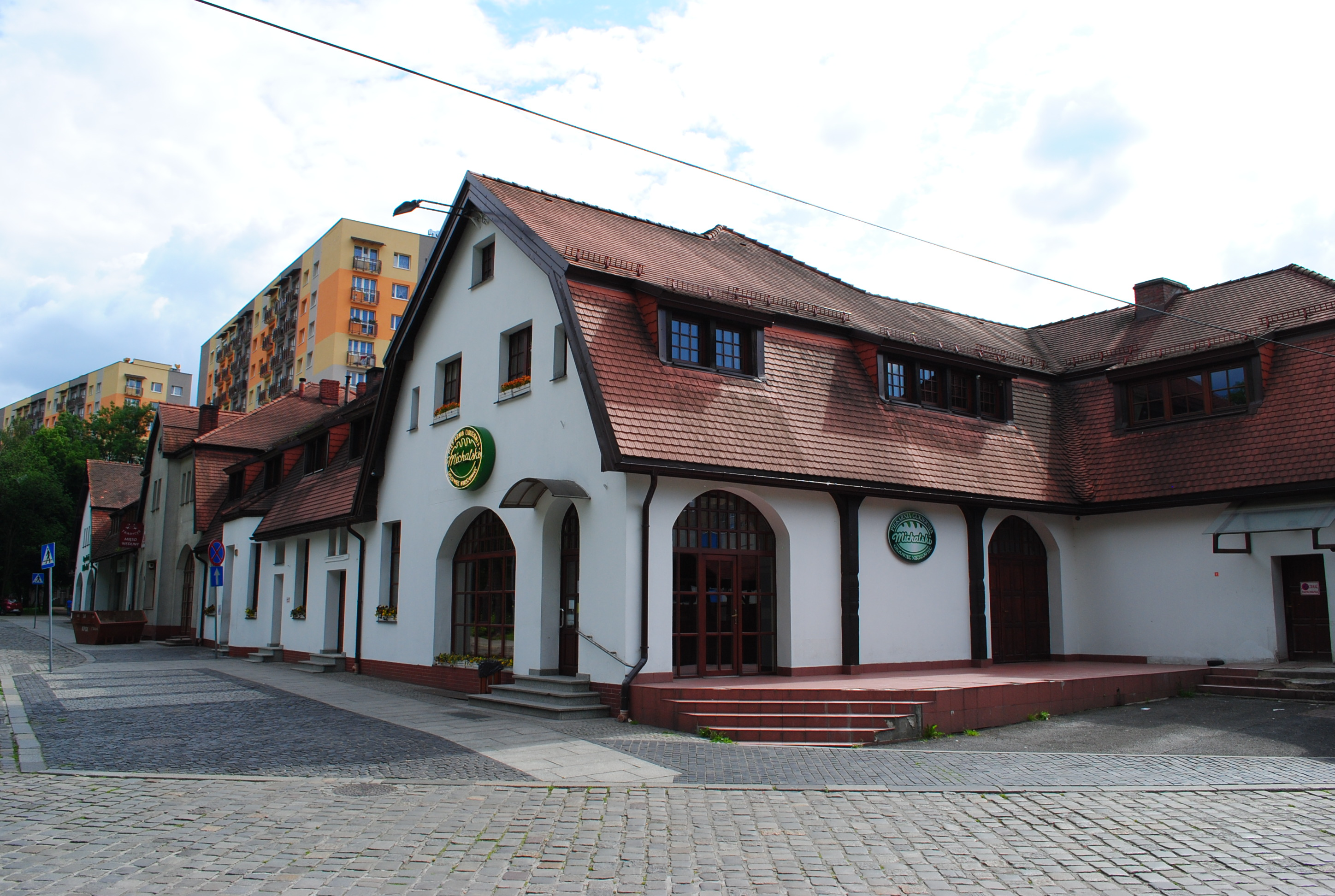
Department store (formerly a cooperative store) at 7–10 Pod Lipami Square

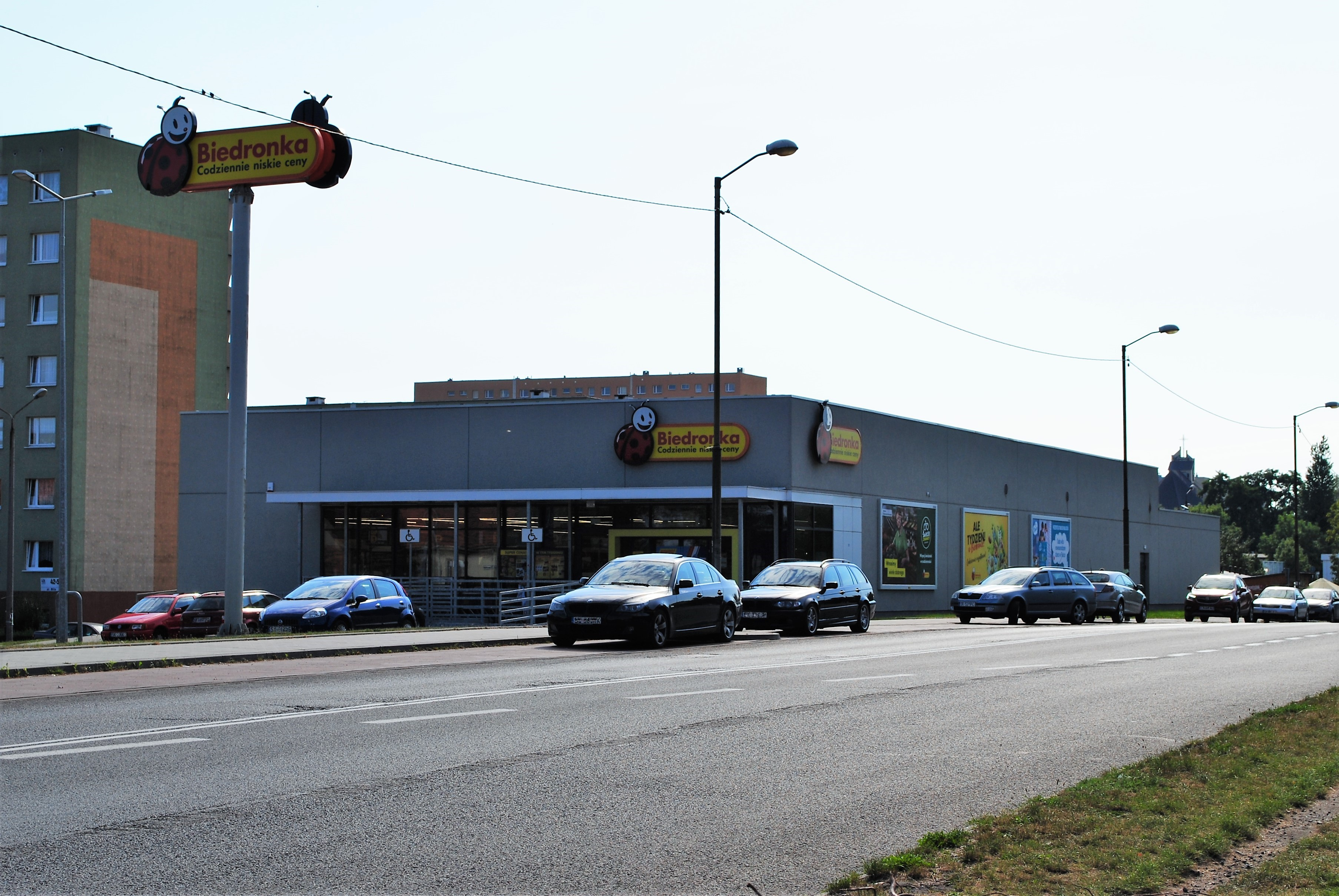
Biedronka supermarket at 84 Mysłowicka Street

Two local retail and service hubs have developed in Giszowiec:

- Pod Lipami Square along with the neighboring streets: Gościnna, Barbórki, Batalionów Chłopskich, Wojciech, and the area around Przyjazna and Agata streets. This is the area surrounding the central square, Pod Lipami Square, which is part of the planned urban layout of the company town. It was transformed with the construction of new apartment buildings in the 1960s and 1970s. In 2007, 7,709 people lived within 500 meters of the area. It offers a full range of services, including various types of commercial facilities, a preschool and elementary school, a community center, a library, a church, recreational areas, and a public transportation stop. The area also has many types of dining and service establishments;
- The intersection area: Mysłowicka, Karliczka, and Kolista streets. This area, together with the rest of the post-war development zone (Miła and Adam streets), forms a loosely organized layout of scattered services, typically linked to green spaces. In 2007, 7,455 people lived within a 500-meter radius of the aforementioned intersection. The area has facilities such as retail outlets, a preschool, a community center, and public transportation stops. The development of commercial and retail facilities, along with the construction of new multi-family housing complexes, did not initially meet the growing needs of the district's residents. The first seven retail pavilions were built in the second half of the 1960s. Later, plans for a large shopping center in the heart of the district were abandoned in favor of two pavilions: on Wojciech and Adam streets.

In addition, retail and service outlets from various sectors are located throughout the district. These include, among others, self-service stores, of which the following are located in Giszowiec as of June 2020:

- Biedronka (two stores: 84 Mysłowicka Street and 57 Wojciech Street),
- Lewiatan (51a Wojciecha Street),
- Lidl (3 Kolista Street).

Automotive services have also developed in Giszowiec, mainly in the area around 73 Pułku Piechoty Street. As of mid-November 2020, this area is home to dealerships for three car brands: Kia (Euro-Kas; 1 73 Pułku Piechoty Street), Honda (JKK Moto; 3 73 Pułku Piechoty Street), and Volvo (Euro-Kas; 1 73 Pułku Piechoty Street). At 13 Pszczyńska Street, there is a vehicle inspection station belonging to the Silesian Automobile Club. There are also two gas stations in the district: Amic Energy at 5 Kolista Street and BP at 82 Mysłowicka Street.

In terms of residents’ access to basic services, in 2007, 99.8% of the district's residents lived within 800 meters of a preschool, 85.2% within 800 meters of an elementary school, 99.9% within 800 meters of a community center, 91.2% within 800 meters of a library, and 87.1% within 800 meters of a health clinic.

== Technical infrastructure ==
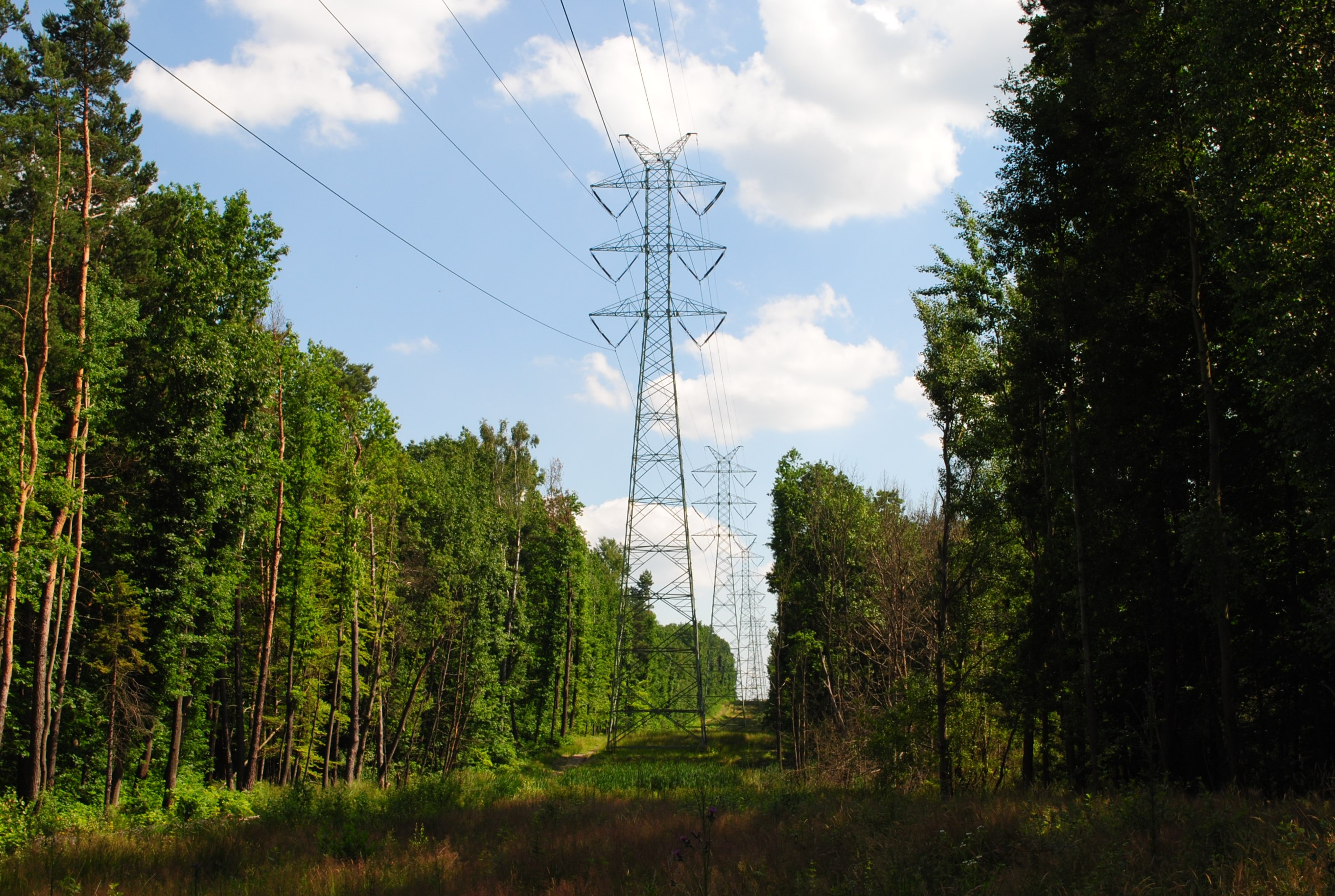
220 kV power transmission line running south along the extension of Kosmiczna Street

There are no drinking water intakes within the district – Giszowiec, like the rest of Katowice, relies on surface water intakes from the following reservoirs: Goczałkowice Lake on the Vistula, Czanieckie Lake on the Soła, and water intakes in Dziećkowice, Maczki, and Kozłowa Góra. Water from the Water Treatment Plant is distributed via main and distribution water mains. Main water mains managed by Katowice Waterworks (including the 500/400 Giszowiec-Janów main line) run through Giszowiec, as well as a water supply network managed by the Upper Silesian Waterworks Company (along Pszczyńska Street). A new drinking water pipeline, along with a water pumping station and retention reservoirs, was built in the late 1960s and early 1970s as part of the housing estate's expansion.

The sewer system is managed by the Katowice Waterworks and is located within the catchment area of the Radocha wastewater treatment plant in Sosnowiec; ultimately, it is intended to be part of the catchment area of the Dąbrówka Mała-Centrum wastewater treatment plant. As of 2007, wastewater from Giszowiec was discharged to the Giszowiec wastewater treatment plant (then part of the Radocha catchment area), located at the Bolina, which was being decommissioned at the time. Its capacity was 16,500 m³ per day, and it was overloaded by incoming wastewater by more than 100%. The technical condition of the sanitary sewer network in the Giszowiec sub-catchment area was satisfactory (26% of the entire network) and fair (33%) at the time, while the combined sewer system was fair (47%) and poor (25%). A central biological-mechanical wastewater treatment plant was built at the turn of the 1960s and 1970s, along with the expansion of Giszowiec.

Electricity is supplied to the residents of Giszowiec via a 110-kV high-voltage grid connecting the district to nearby power plants. The largest substation in Giszowiec is located in the area of Kosmiczna Street, near the Roździeński shaft of the Wieczorek Coal Mine. This is the Roździeński substation with a 110/20 kV voltage level and two 25 MVA transformers. Additionally, there are two 110 kV power stations near the Staszic Coal Mine: Giszowiec (on 73 Pułku Piechoty Street) and Staszic (on the plant premises). A high-voltage (220 kV) power line also runs through the eastern part of Giszowiec, parallel to Kosmiczna Street, extending from the Łagisza Power Station. The power grid is managed by the Tauron Polska Energia group. The average electricity consumption per household in Katowice was 865.7 kWh in 2006.

Heat is supplied by the Dalkia Polska Energia – Wieczorek Production Plant. Its thermal capacity in September 2009 was 131.1 MW.

== Transport ==
=== Road transport ===
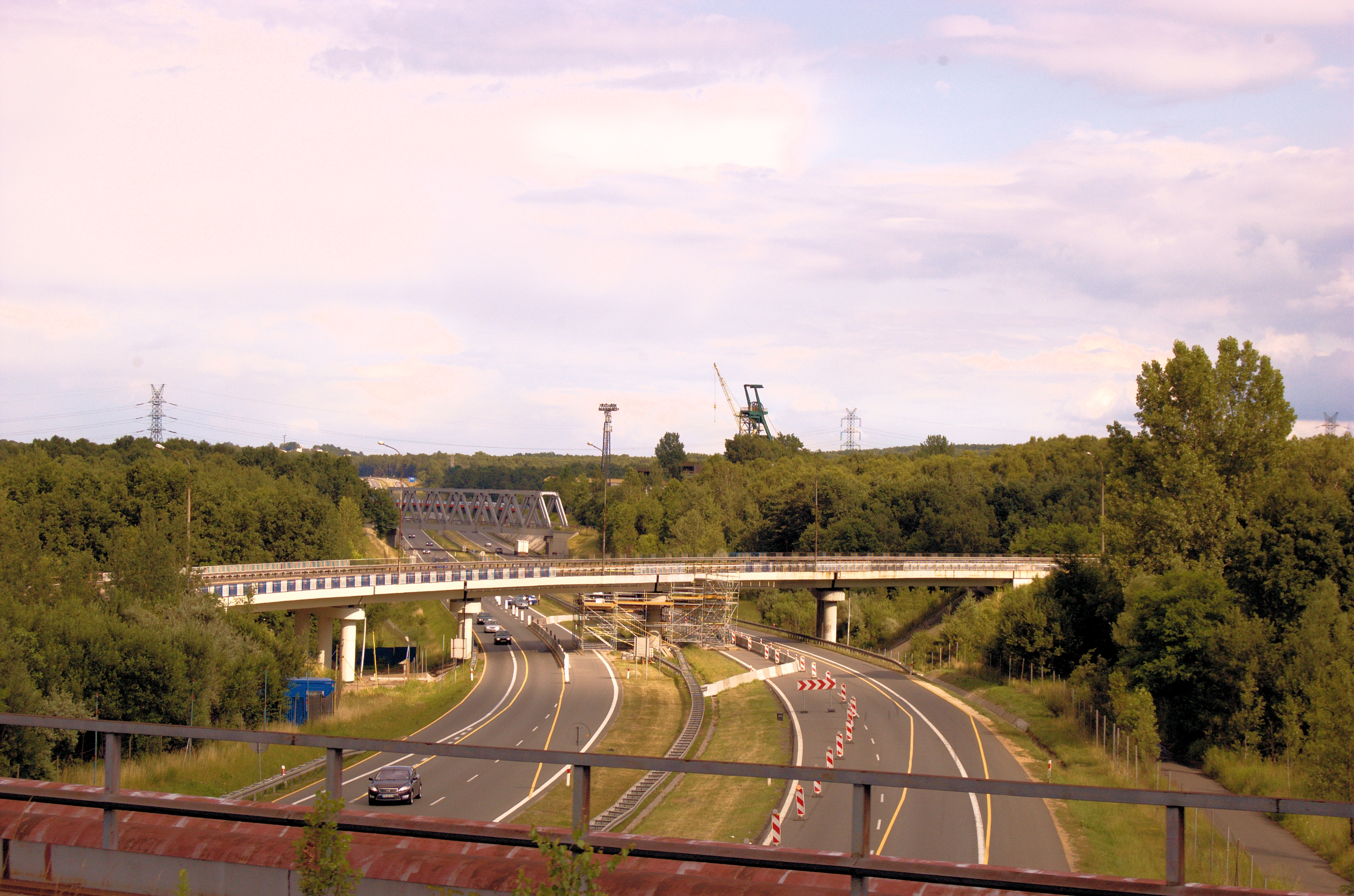
A4 motorway near Giszowiec; in the foreground, the overpass along Szopienicka Street

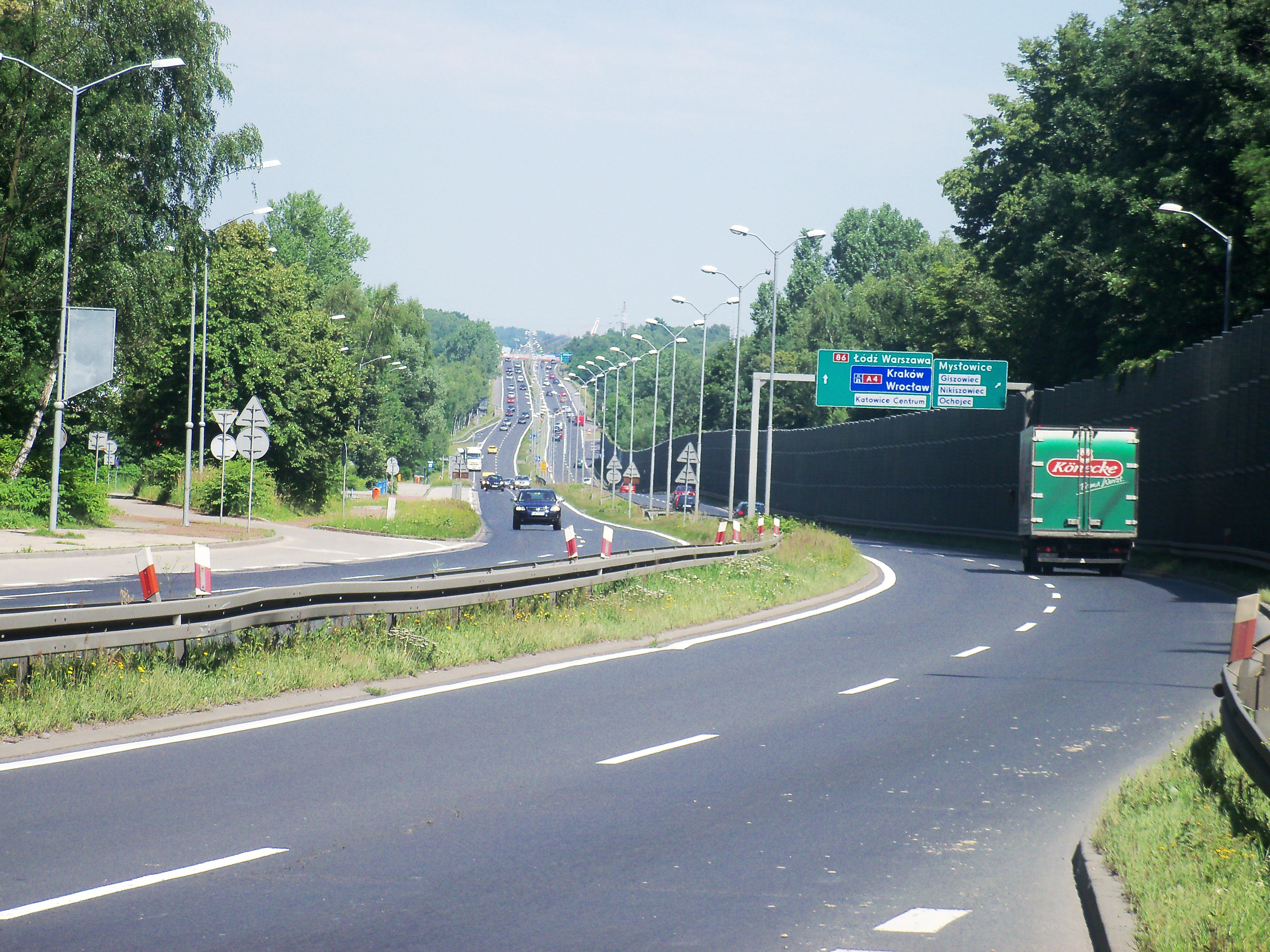
Fragment of Pszczyńska Street before renovation (view from the north)

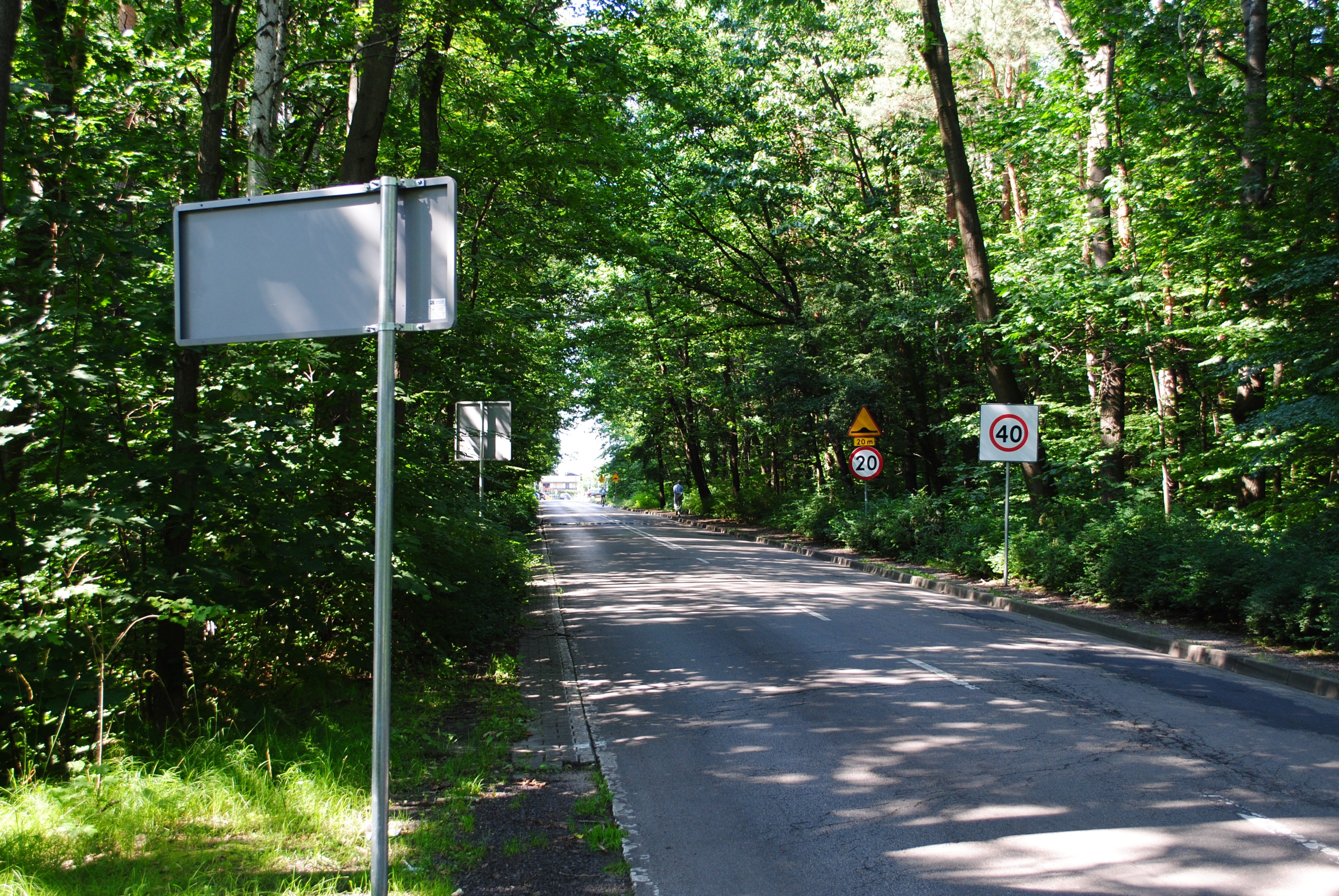
Fragment of Adam Street (view from the south)

The district's road network was mainly planned and constructed alongside the entire Giszowiec company town, which was built between 1907 and 1910. The central point of the district is Pod Lipami Square, from which the following streets currently extend in various directions: Gościnna, Barbórki (connecting road), Wojciech, and Batalionów Chłopskich. This layout was originally adapted to the roads existing at the time, connecting the planned housing estate with workplaces. Giszowiec originally formed a compact rectangle measuring approximately 750 by 1,000 meters, bounded by the following streets: Mysłowicka (to the north), Pod Kasztanami (to the east), Górniczego Stanu (to the south), and Pszczyńska (to the west).

Three national-level transportation routes pass through Giszowiec:

- A4 motorway – the northeastern part of the district. In addition, the Murckowska Interchange, connecting the motorway with national road 86, is located nearby. This highway provides interregional and international connections to the west (Opole, Wrocław, and further to Germany) and to the east (Kraków, Rzeszów, and further to Ukraine),
- National road 81 (73 Pułku Piechoty Street) – begins in Giszowiec at the intersection with national road 86 – Pszczyńska and Kolista streets. It continues as an exit route from Katowice toward Mikołów,
- National road 86 (Pszczyńska Street) – surrounds Giszowiec from the west. To the north, it provides a connection to the expressway S1 and further to the Katowice Airport, and to the south, to Tychy.

Giszowiec has connections to neighboring districts in every direction, as well as to Mysłowice:

- Szopienicka Street – connects with Mysłowicka Street and leads north toward Nikiszowiec,
- Mysłowicka Street – leads eastward to Mysłowice (Janów Miejski and Ćmok),
- Adam Street – connects with Górniczego Stanu Street and leads southward to Mysłowice (to the Wesoła district),
- Pszczyńska Street – heads north toward Śródmieście, and south toward Murcki and further to Tychy,
- 73 Pułku Piechoty Street – intersects with Pszczyńska Street at a junction and heads west toward Ochojec.

Among the roads running through Giszowiec, the A4 motorway is of the greatest importance, as its main function is to carry interregional and international traffic. Pszczyńska Street is the only main road for accelerated traffic in Giszowiec, which is also one of the main elements of Katowice's citywide road network. The remaining routes connecting Giszowiec with neighboring districts (except for Adam and Mysłowicka streets from the intersection with Szopienicka Street toward Mysłowice) are main roads, which, in addition to inter-district connections, provide intra-city links and also connect to higher-category roads. The only collector road in Giszowiec is Mysłowicka Street (from the intersection with Szopienicka Street toward Mysłowice), and local roads include, among others, Ceramiczna, Górniczego Stanu, Kosmiczna, Przyjazna, and Radosna streets. Giszowiec and Murcki, in terms of the quality of connections to the various macro-regions of Katowice, are the best-connected districts thanks to their proximity to the city's main thoroughfares running in all directions.

=== Rail transport ===
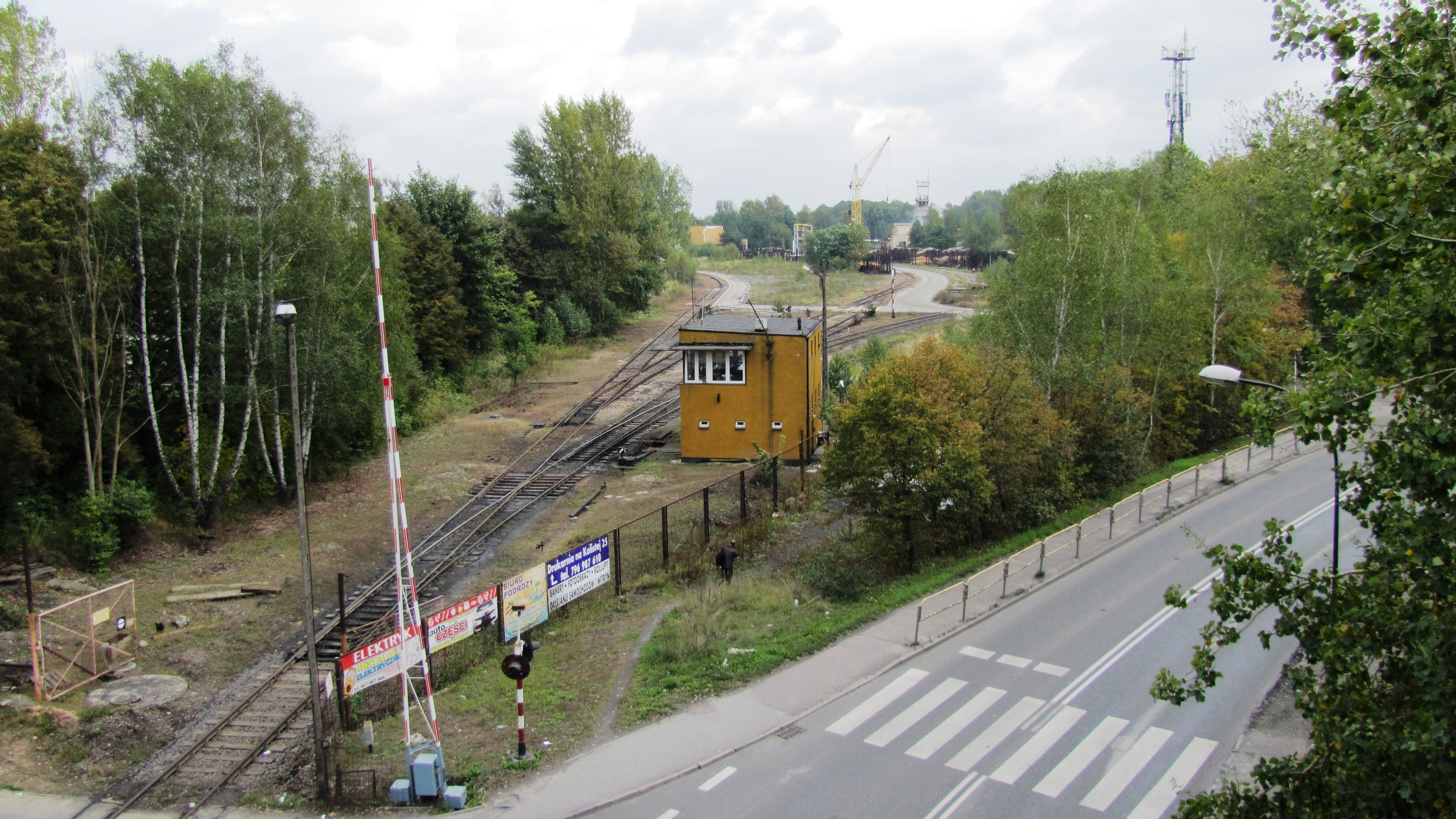
Former spur line to Shaft IV of the Staszic Coal Mine located on Kolista Street

The first railway in Giszowiec, running along the current northern border of the district, was the Right Bank of the Oder Railway. It was put into operation on the section running through Giszowiec (from Szopienice Północne to Murcki and further to Dziedzice) on 24 June 1870. No station was built on this route within Giszowiec. The railway was nationalized in 1884. The section of the railway running within the boundaries of Giszowiec is currently the Katowice Szopienice Północne–Katowice Muchowiec KMb railway and is used only for freight traffic. Parallel to it, an electrified freight railway connecting the Dorota station in Dąbrowa Górnicza with the Panewnik station via Janów and Muchowiec (Dąbrowa Górnicza Towarowa–Panewnik railway) was put into service on 27 September 1953, and in 1960, a railway connecting Mysłowice with Murcki (Mysłowice MwB–Katowice Muchowiec KMa railway) was opened.

In addition, a section of the Southern Sand Railway ran through Giszowiec, connecting the Jęzor Centralny junction station to the Wujek Coal Mine, along with branches leading to the Murcki-Staszic Coal Mine (including Shaft IV) and to the Wieczorek Coal Mine. It was the Szczecin–Świnoujście railway. It was built between 1959 and 1961 and ran from the east parallel to Mysłowicka Street, then turned north at the later-built Shaft IV of the Staszic Coal Mine and continued west toward Muchowiec.

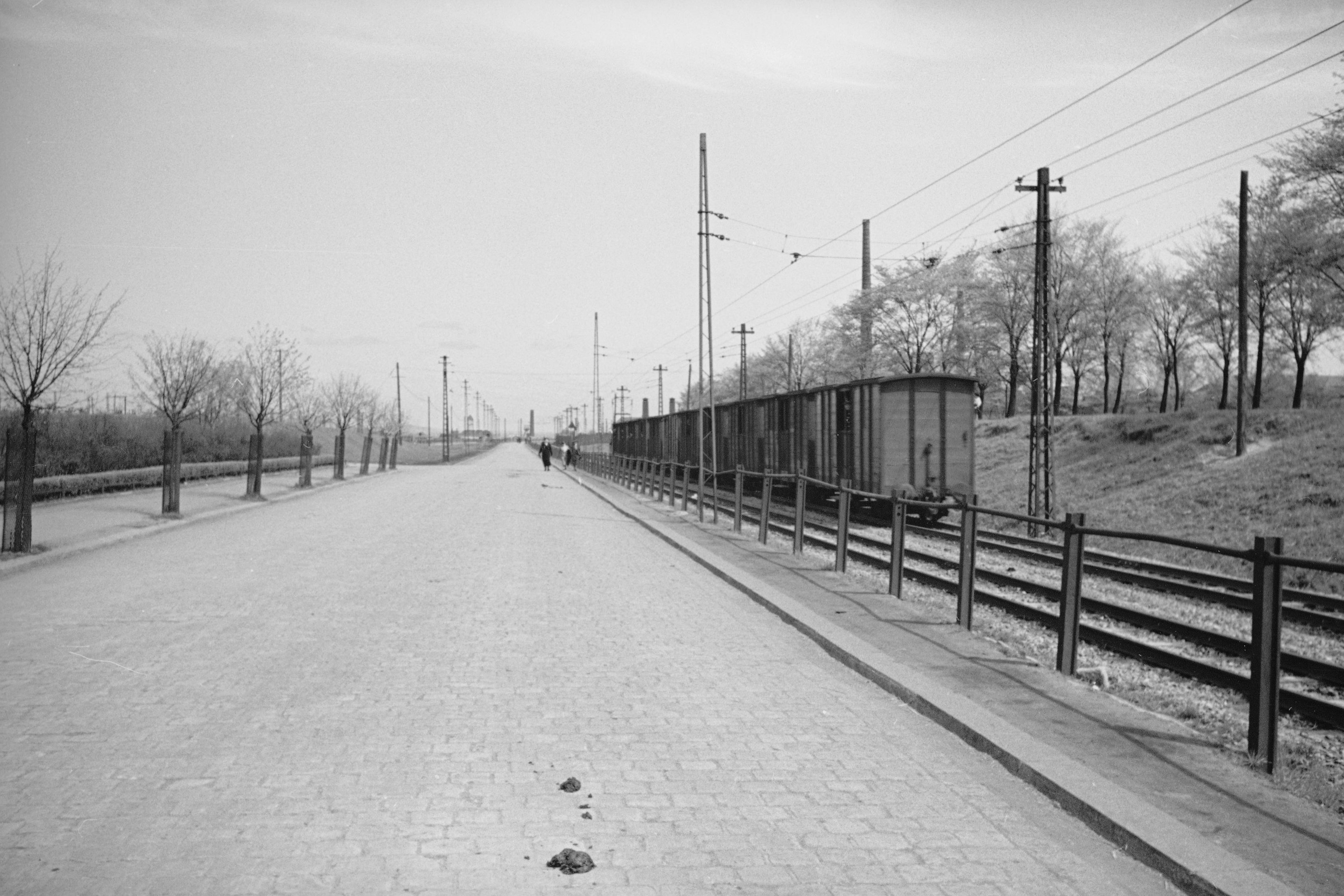
Balkan along present-day Szopienicka Street in 1937

On 20 July 1964, with the opening of the Staszic Coal Mine, a connecting railway running from the direction of Ochojec (from the Staszic branch station) was opened. Further east, it connected with Shaft IV. It ran parallel to Karolinki and Kolista atreets and also crossed 73 Pułku Piechoty Street perpendicularly.

Narrow-gauge railways also ran through Giszowiec, carrying both freight and passengers. In 1906, the Georg von Giesches Erben company received a concession to operate a private narrow-gauge railway, and on 6 January 1914, the Regional Railway Directorate issued a permit to commence passenger service. The newly built railway connected Giszowiec with the Albert (Wojciech) shaft in Szopienice. The first passenger train likely ran in 1916. This railway was commonly known as the Balkan, and travel on it was free of charge. At that time, the Balkan ran 28 times on weekdays and 21 times on weekends. In the early 1920s, a branch line of the narrow-gauge railway was built to the brickyard, running parallel between Pod Kasztanami and Kosmiczna streets and continuing eastward along Górniczego Stanu Street. After World War II, it was electrified. The railway's final run took place on 31 December 1977.

=== Public transport ===
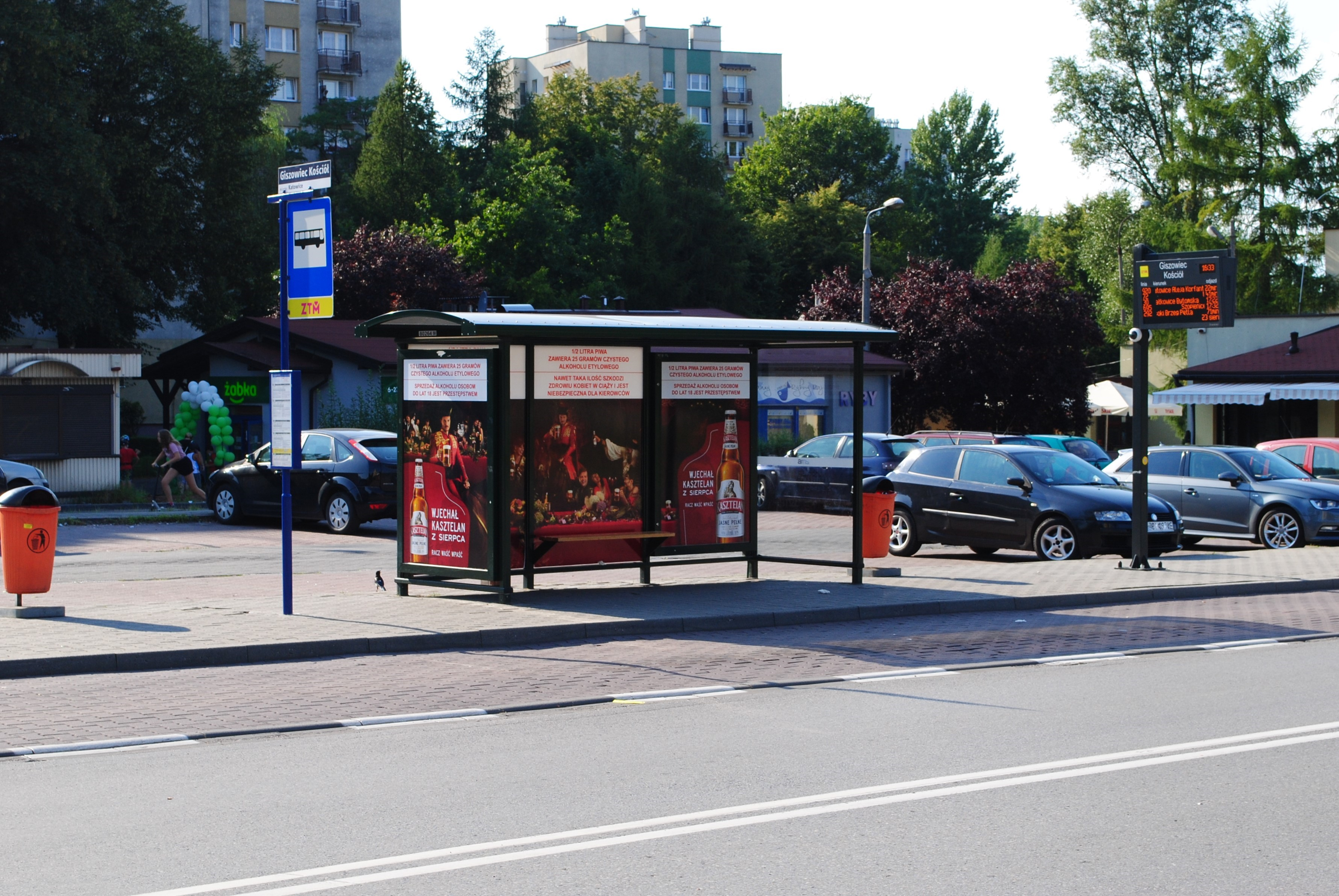
Giszowiec Kościół bus stop on Batalionów Chłopskich Street

Public transportation in Giszowiec consists of bus routes that have been in operation since the interwar period. They provide connections to other districts of Katowice and to neighboring cities – Mysłowice and Tychy. The Metropolitan Transport Authority organizes the bus services operating through Giszowiec. The main north-south public transportation routes are: Pszczyńska Street for bus lines 1 and 4 connecting the district with Śródmieście and Tychy, the M10 connecting the district with Kobiór and Śródmieście, the M22 connecting Śródmieście with Międzyrzecze (Bojszowy), lines 672 and 673 toward Murcki, line 695 toward Murcki or Mikołów, and Szopienicka Street for lines 30, 72, 108, 292, 674, and 695, connecting the district with Janów, Nikiszowiec, and Szopienice. On the east-west axis, these are: Kolista and Mysłowicka streets for line 223, as well as Mysłowicka Street for line M13 toward Mysłowice and Sosnowiec, and 73 Pułku Piechoty Street, which runs through the forest toward Ochojec, Piotrowice, Ligota, and the transport hub in Brynów on 73 Pułku Piechoty Street, which is served by line 292.

As of March 2024, there are 14 public transportation stops in Giszowiec (Gościnna, Górniczego Stanu, Karolinki, Kolista Pętla, Kolista Stacja Paliw, Kopalnia Staszic, Kosmiczna, Kościół, Mysłowicka, Osiedle, Przyjazna, Przyjemna, Radosna, and Szyb Roździeński), located at various points throughout the district. In the central area, on Batalionów Chłopskich Street, there is the Giszowiec Kościół stop, from which 10 bus lines depart from two platforms (including one night bus and one metropolitan bus). It is the only stop in the district equipped with electronic displays of the Dynamic Passenger Information System and a solar-powered ticket machine.

=== Bicycle infrastructure ===
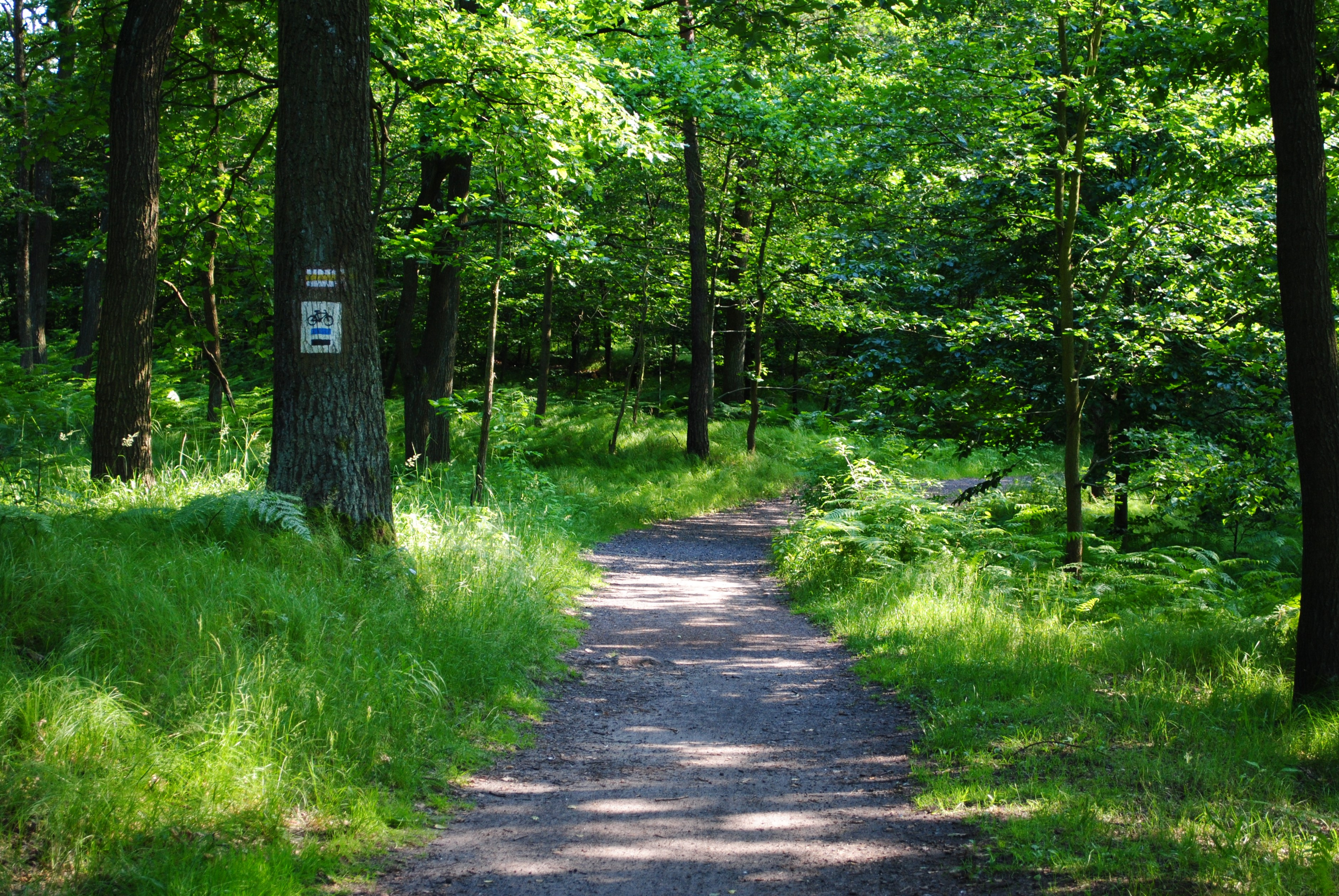
Bicycle routes No. 3 and 101 near the Barbara-Janina resort

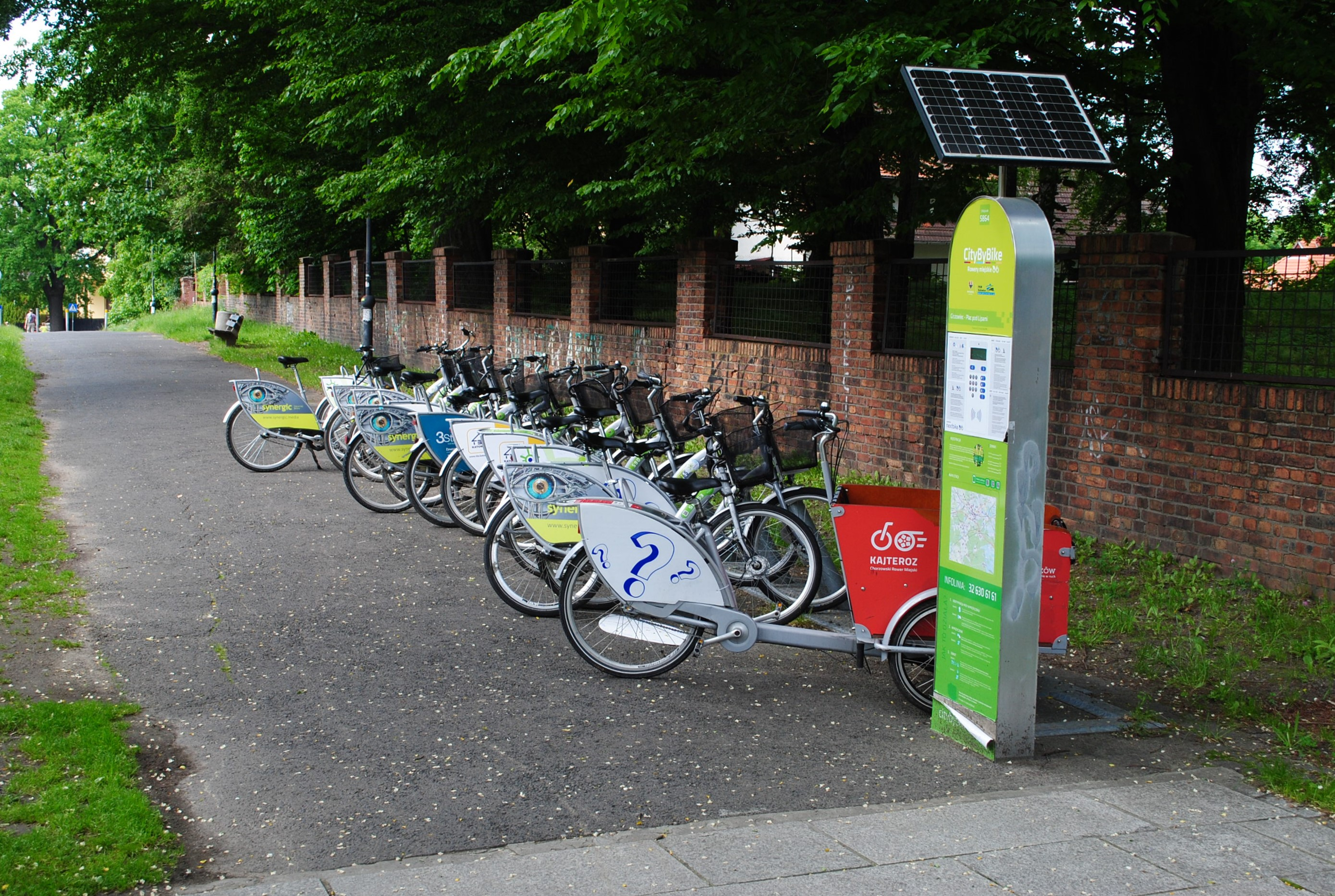
City by bike station No. 5864 near Pod Lipami Square (2020)

Giszowiec has a well-developed system of bicycle paths. Dedicated bicycle paths are located on the following streets:

- Górniczego Stanu Street from the intersection with Kosmiczna Street to Ceramiczna Street – a 2.2-meter-wide path with a red asphalt surface,
- Ceramiczna Street along its entire length – a 2.2-meter-wide path with a red asphalt surface,
- Mysłowicka Street from No. 41 to the intersection with Wojciech Street – a path 2.0–2.5 m wide with a red cobblestone surface,
- Szopienicka Street – a path on the eastern side of the street's roadway, running toward Janów-Nikiszowiec,
- Wojciech Street – on the main section, a path 1.0–2.0 m wide with a red cobblestone surface; on the side branch, a path with a red asphalt surface.

According to the master plan for the bicycle path network published by the City of Katowice, further expansion of the network is planned, with the section from Murcki (along Pszczyńska Street) along Mysłowicka Street, as well as the section from Mysłowicka Street along Pszczyńska Street toward the Valley of Three Ponds, is intended to serve a transportation function, while the remaining existing and planned routes along Wojciech, Górniczego Stanu, and Ceramiczna streets, as well as the forest sections, are intended for recreational use.

In Katowice, several bicycle trails have been designated as part of the "Cycling Through Silesia" project, three of which run through Giszowiec:

- No. 3 Giszowiec (Wojciech Street) – Barbara-Janina – Zadole – Panewniki,
- No. 101 Ochojec – Barbara-Janina – Murcki – Hamerla,
- No. 121 Janów – Nikiszowiec – Bolina Park – Giszowiec (Pod Lipami Square) – Murcki Forests.

Giszowiec also has a municipal bike-sharing network – Metrorower – which replaced the City by bike system. The first station in the district opened on 1 August 2017 at Pod Lipami Square. As of March 2024, the following stations are in operation there: 27191 (Kolista Street), 27414 (Pod Kasztanami Street), 27709 (Batalionów Chłopskich Street), and 27718 (Pod Lipami Square).

== Architecture and urban planning ==
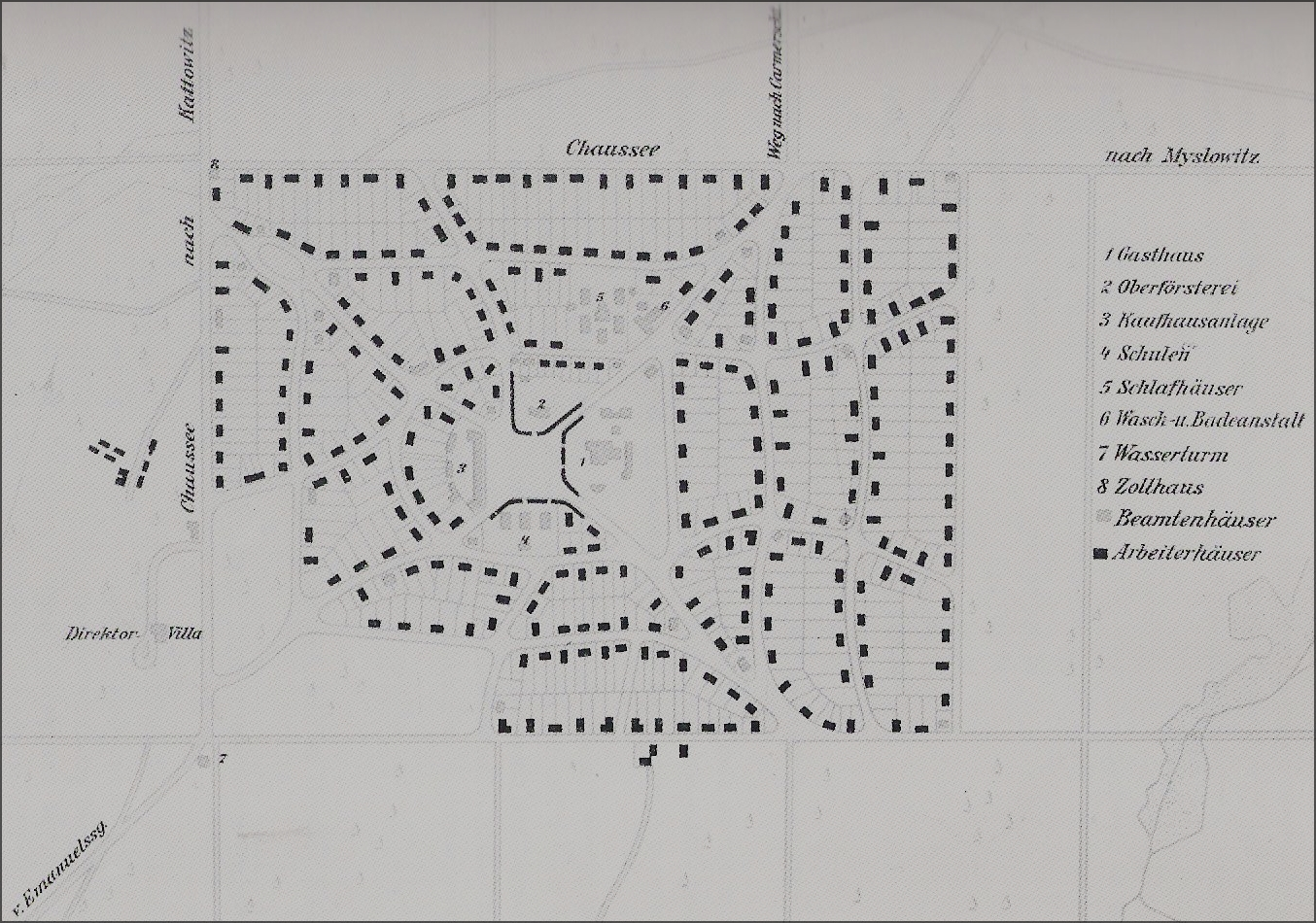
Original 1910 design for the Giszowiec workers' housing estate differed in some respects from the estate that was eventually built; for instance, the original plan called for development east of the schools, and the layout of the park was also different at that time

Between 1907 and 1910, a garden city housing estate, unique in Europe, was built in the wooded area of Gmina Janów for the workers of the Giesche Coal Mine. The mine itself was located in a rural area, and most of its workforce came from there, which is why living conditions were created for the workers that were familiar to them. Consequently, housing was built in the style of old Upper Silesian peasant cottages.

The housing estate, modeled on traditional folk architecture, consisted of 300 single-story houses with gardens, mostly two- and four-family homes, in which approximately 600 working-class families took up residence. 20 houses for officials were also built. Each building that did not serve a residential function had a shape unique to itself, while the residential houses were built according to 46 designs. To diversify the building forms and avoid monotony, several types of roofs were used, including gambrel, Dutch gable, gable, hip, and pediment roofs. Identical cottages were not built along a single road; instead, efforts were made to vary the size and shape as well as the rhythm of the windows and doors. Officials' houses were more imposing, covered with red roof tiles. The largest of these – the home of the director of the Giesche Coal Mine – was set apart from the workers' houses and, in the English style, surrounded by a park. The workers' houses, on the other hand, were covered with fire-resistant shingle roofs.

From the moment it was established, the housing estate was electrified (both the homes and the street lighting). Electricity was supplied from the St. George Power Plant, located at the Carmer shaft of the Giesche Coal Mine, to a distribution station built outside the estate, and from there to 15 substations. Water was initially drawn from the county network to a water tower located at the highest point of the housing estate, and from there through pipelines along the streets to the entire estate. From 1918, Giszowiec and Nikiszowiec were supplied from the Prittwitz spring. The housing estate initially had no sewer system – sewage was then transported at night to a composting plant outside Giszowiec, where it was processed into compost for fertilizing the soil in home gardens.

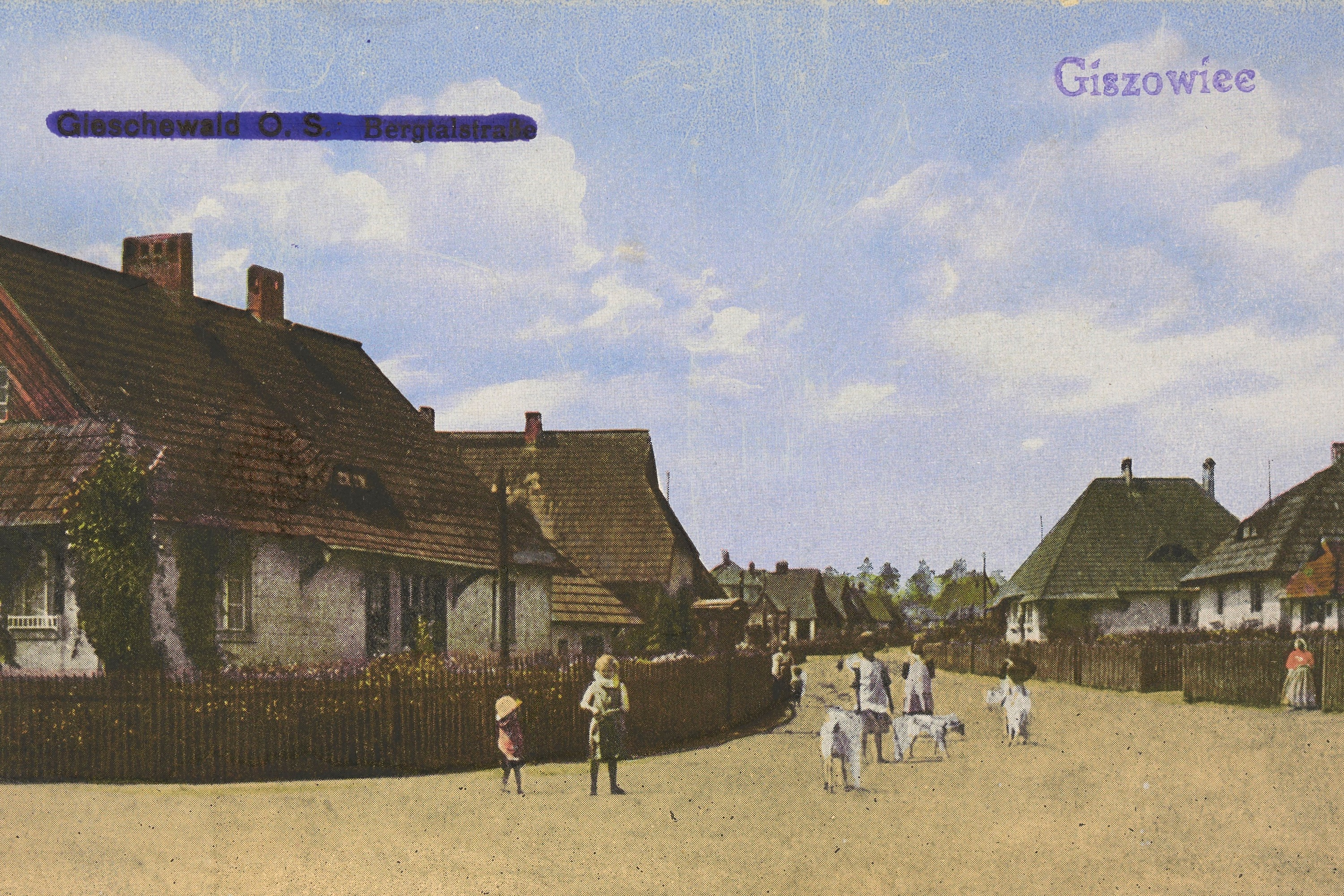
Pre-war postcard depicting the buildings of the Giszowiec housing estate – then known as Bergtalstrasse; today Działkowa Street

The floor area of the workers' apartments was very large by the standards of the time, ranging from 38 to 52 m² depending on the building. These apartments consisted of an entryway, a kitchen, a living room, and a storage room or a second bedroom. They had no running water, but it could be drawn from street hydrants installed every 100 meters. The houses were also equipped with a large attic and a basement, and each house had an adjoining garden, a small outbuilding, and a barn. The gardens also contained outhouses with removable containers. Twice a week, these were taken to a composting facility on the outskirts of the city. The officials' apartments were larger and comfortably furnished. Their usable floor area ranged from 76 to 104 m², and they consisted of 2, 3, or 4 rooms with a kitchen and a storage room. They were equipped with water and sewage systems, and some also had a toilet. The director, foreman, doctor, and forest superintendent each had a separate house.

The housing estate covered a rectangular area measuring approximately 750 × 1,000 m. Streets radiated from the central square in four main directions, intersecting with two concentrically arranged ring roads. The third outer ring road ran along the perimeter of the settlement; its western and northern sections were formed by the Katowice–Murcki highway (now Pszczyńska Street) and the road to Mysłowice (now Mysłowicka Street). In the center of the housing estate was a square around which the buildings were grouped: the forest district office, the administrative building, an inn with a theater hall, a bowling alley, and an open-air concert shell. A little further away, outside the housing estate, tennis courts and golf courses were set up for engineers and officials; these were not dismantled until the 1970s, when they were filled in with low-quality coal. One side of the market square was lined with shops, including a bakery and a butcher's shop (a modern cold storage facility was located next to it), and the other side by a school. A bathhouse and laundry with running cold and hot water were built. The bathhouse was used mainly by the miners' wives and children. The laundry was equipped with 32 stations with stone washbasins and electric boilers for boiling laundry. Five dormitories were also built in the housing estate. Each contained five rooms with 12 beds and a washroom. A dining hall and a canteen were built near the dormitories. Workers' houses were located along the streets, and gardens were situated at the back of the plots.

Historic Giszowiec housing estate from between 1907 and 1910

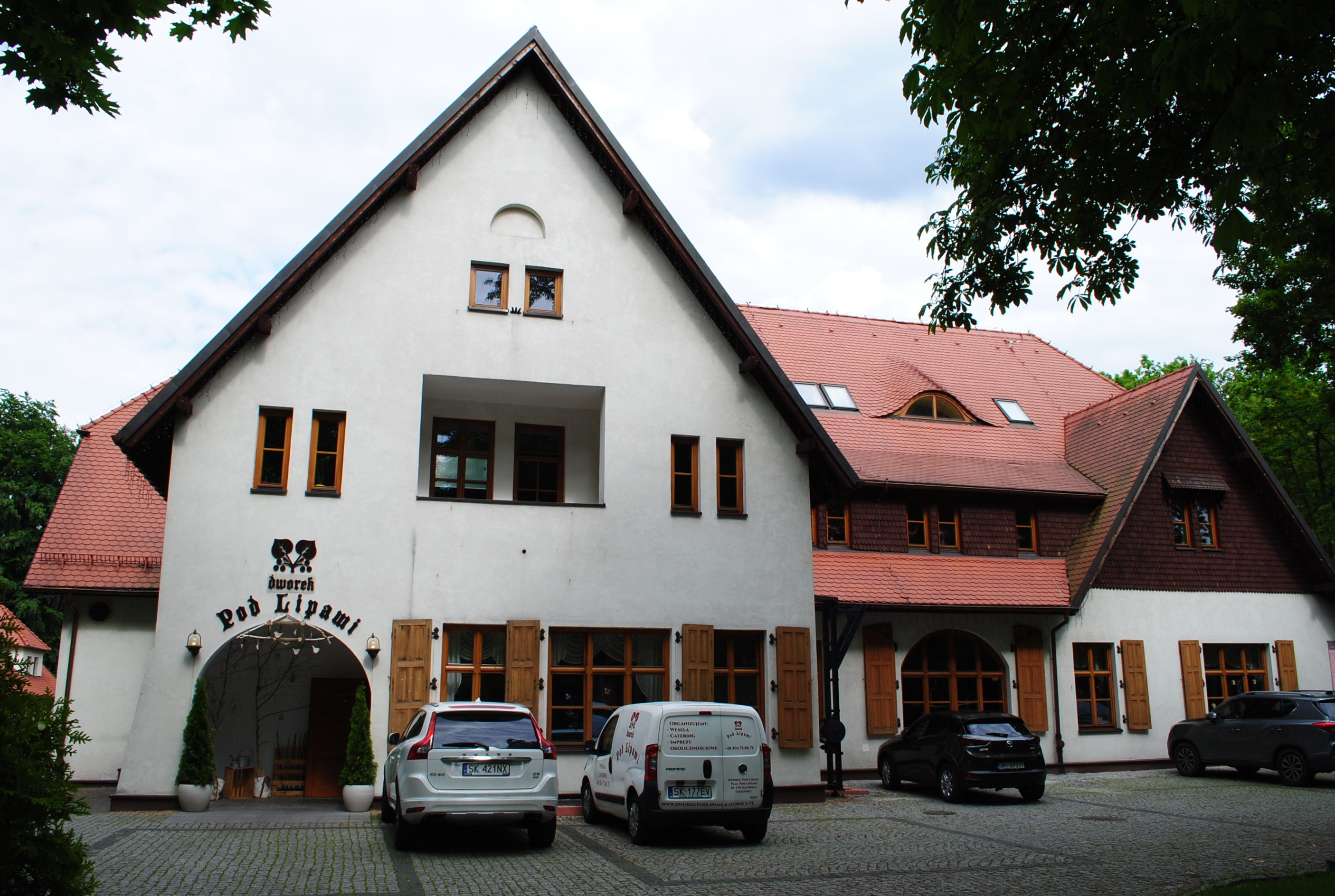
Inn
(1 Pod Lipami Square)

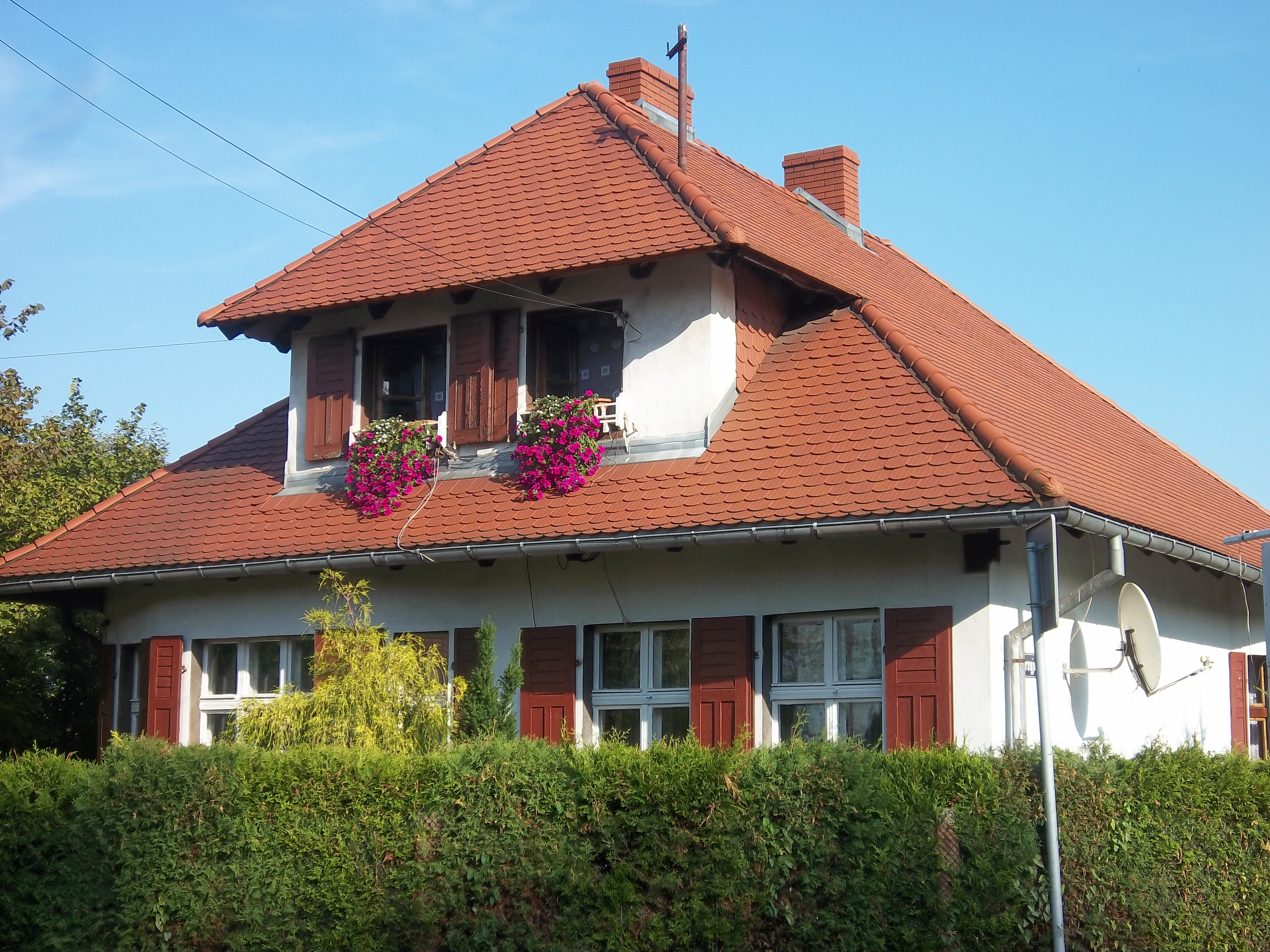
Teacher's house (28 Działkowa Street)

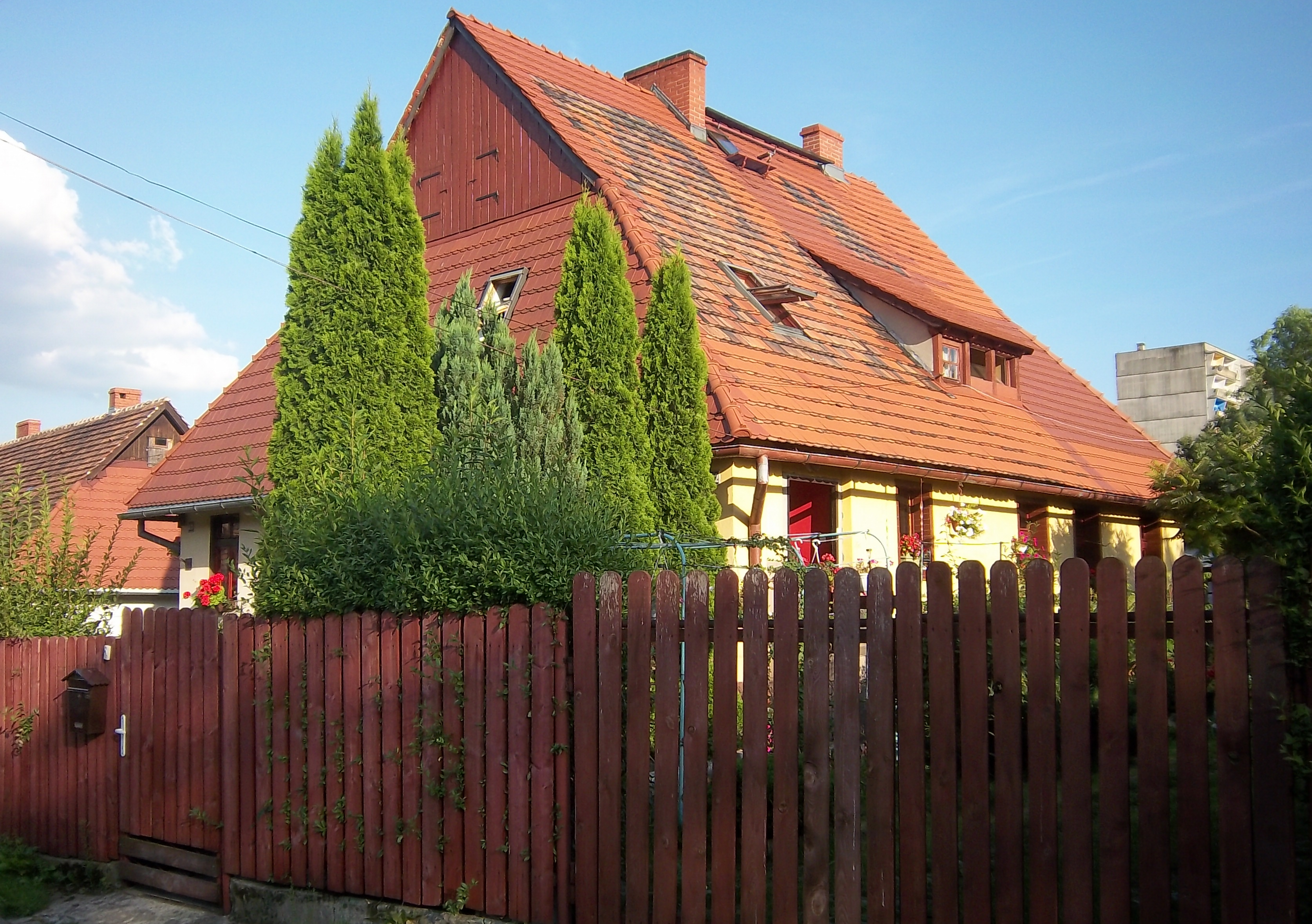
2 Ewa Street

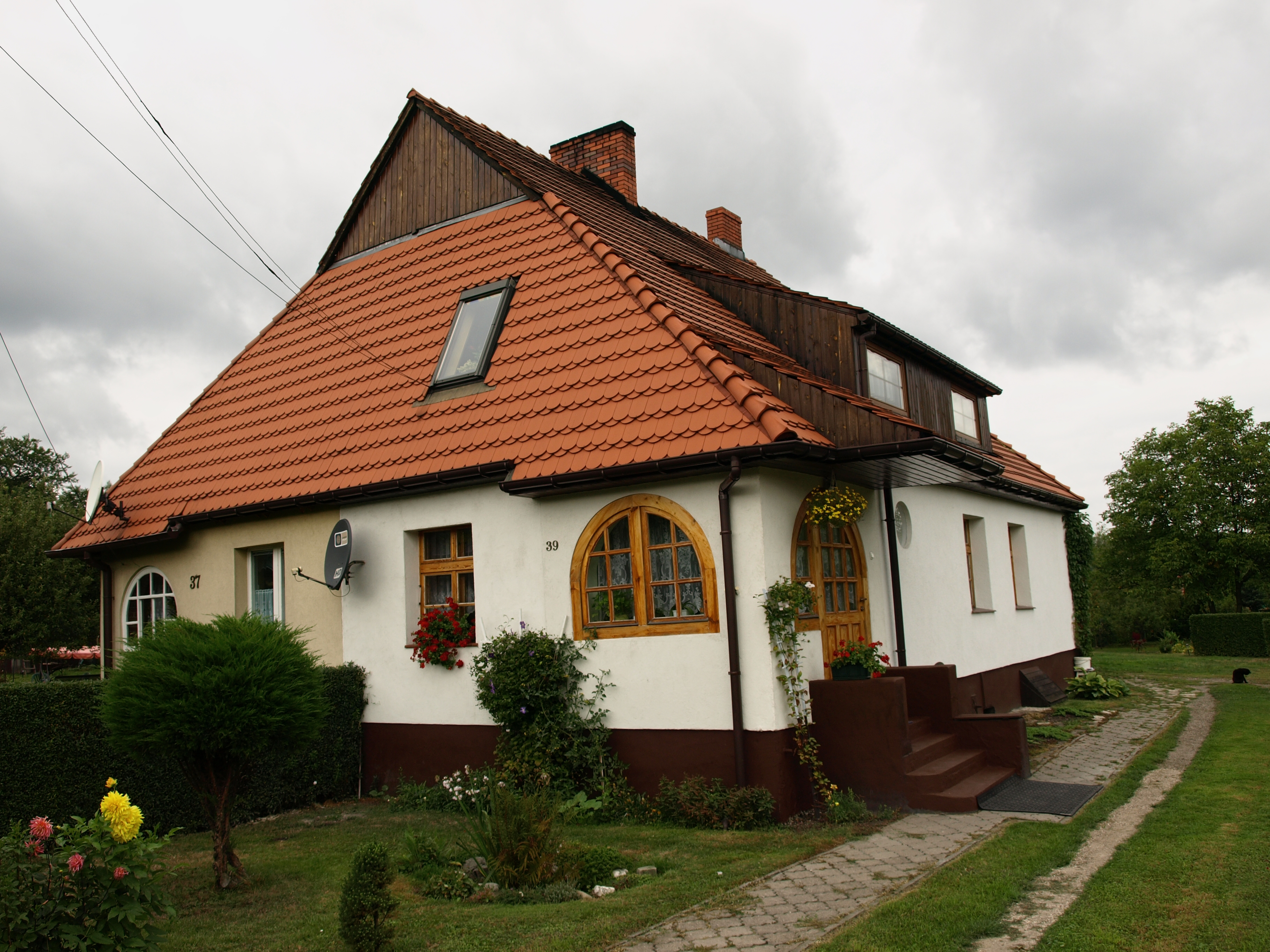
37–39 Górniczego Stanu Street

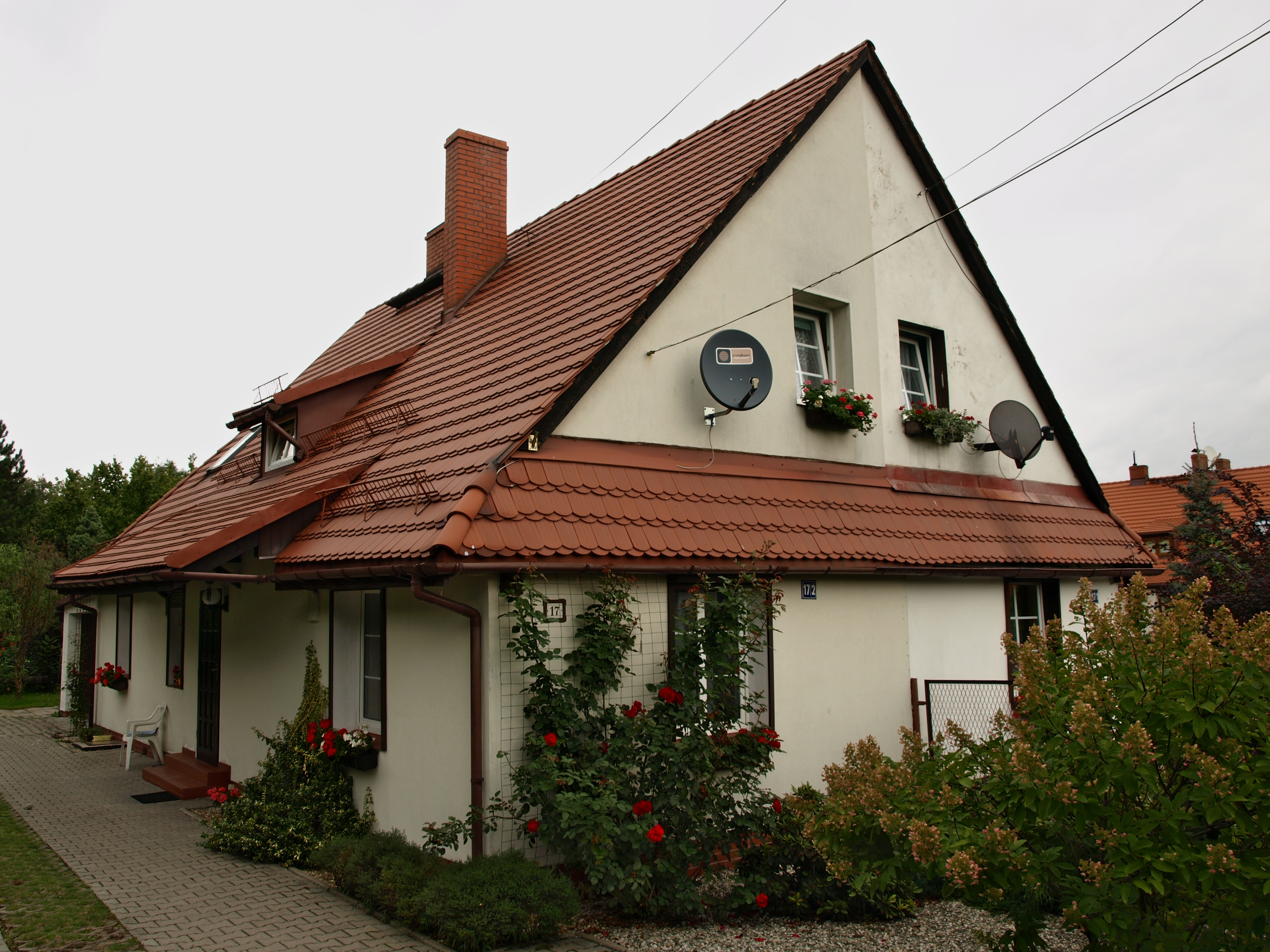
17 Przyjemna Street

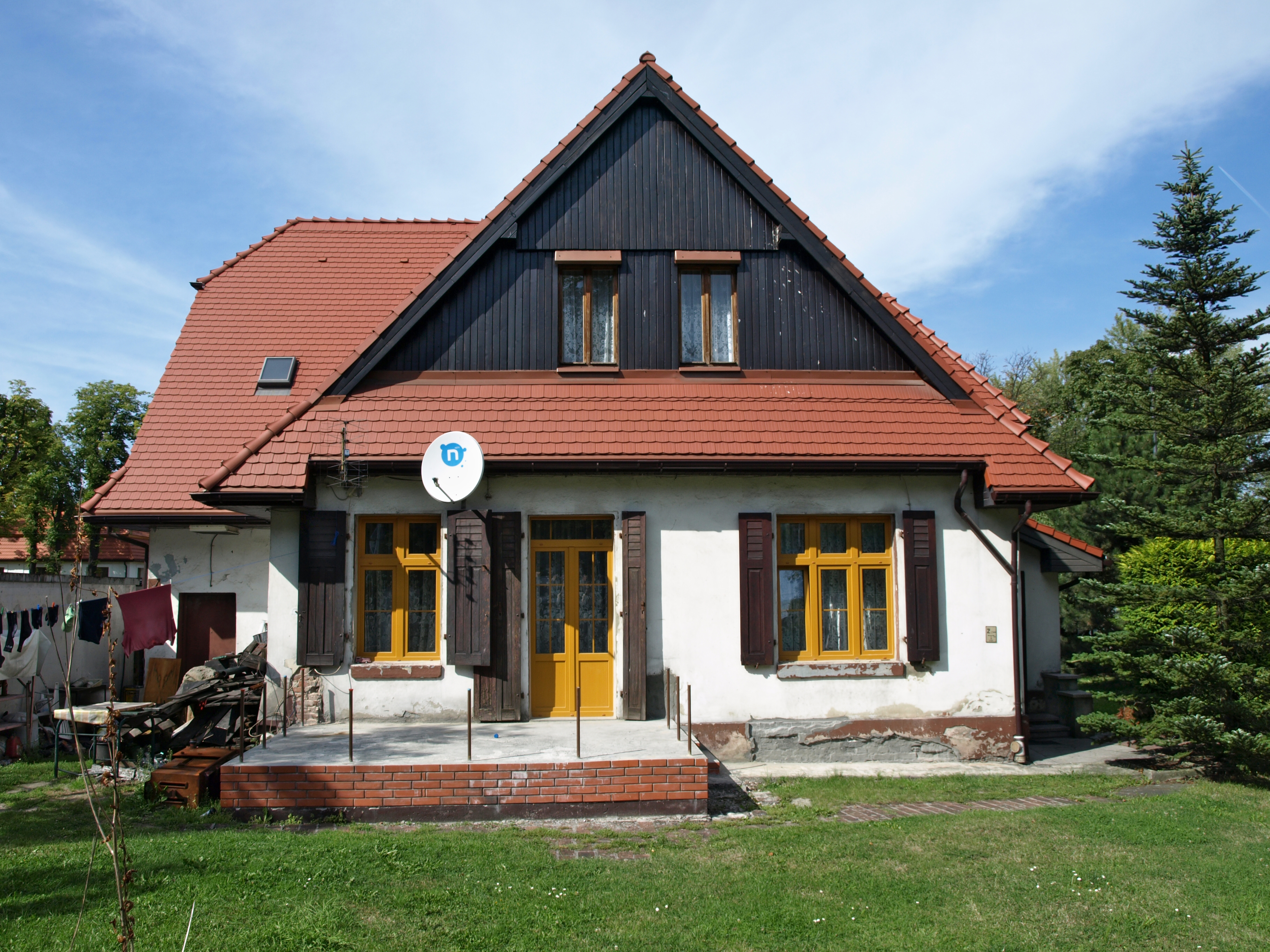
1 Radosna Street

After the end of World War I, the next phase of expansion of the workers' colony began. Between 1920 and 1924, a reserve strip of land stretching toward Mysłowice was developed (present-day Pod Kasztanami and Kosmiczna streets). The new buildings were colloquially called Neubau (German for "new development"). Originally, this area had not been developed, likely due to the presence of old adits from the Jacob mining field and unstable soil. The construction of detached houses was replaced with cheaper row housing. Apartment blocks were built to house approximately 220 families. On the inner side, farm buildings with pigsties were located, as well as small gardens. The central block of Neubau was left as a reserve, but a three-story residential and commercial building was constructed there. Among other things, it housed a barbershop that existed until 2016, where paintings by Ewald Gawlik were collected.

The final phase of the historic housing estate's expansion took place in 1926. Following the Silesian-American Corporation's acquisition of all shares in the Giesche joint-stock company, nine families from Montana were brought to Giszowiec, and the so-called American Colony was built for them in the southwestern part of the estate near the water tower. The complex consists of six English-style official villas. In addition, a single-story community center for children and a golf course were built. The Americans lived in these houses until the outbreak of World War II, when the entire Giesche estate was transferred to a receivership, and the company's management was replaced by Germans. After World War II, the estate was nationalized, and Polish families moved into the houses.

Buildings built in the 1920s and 1930s

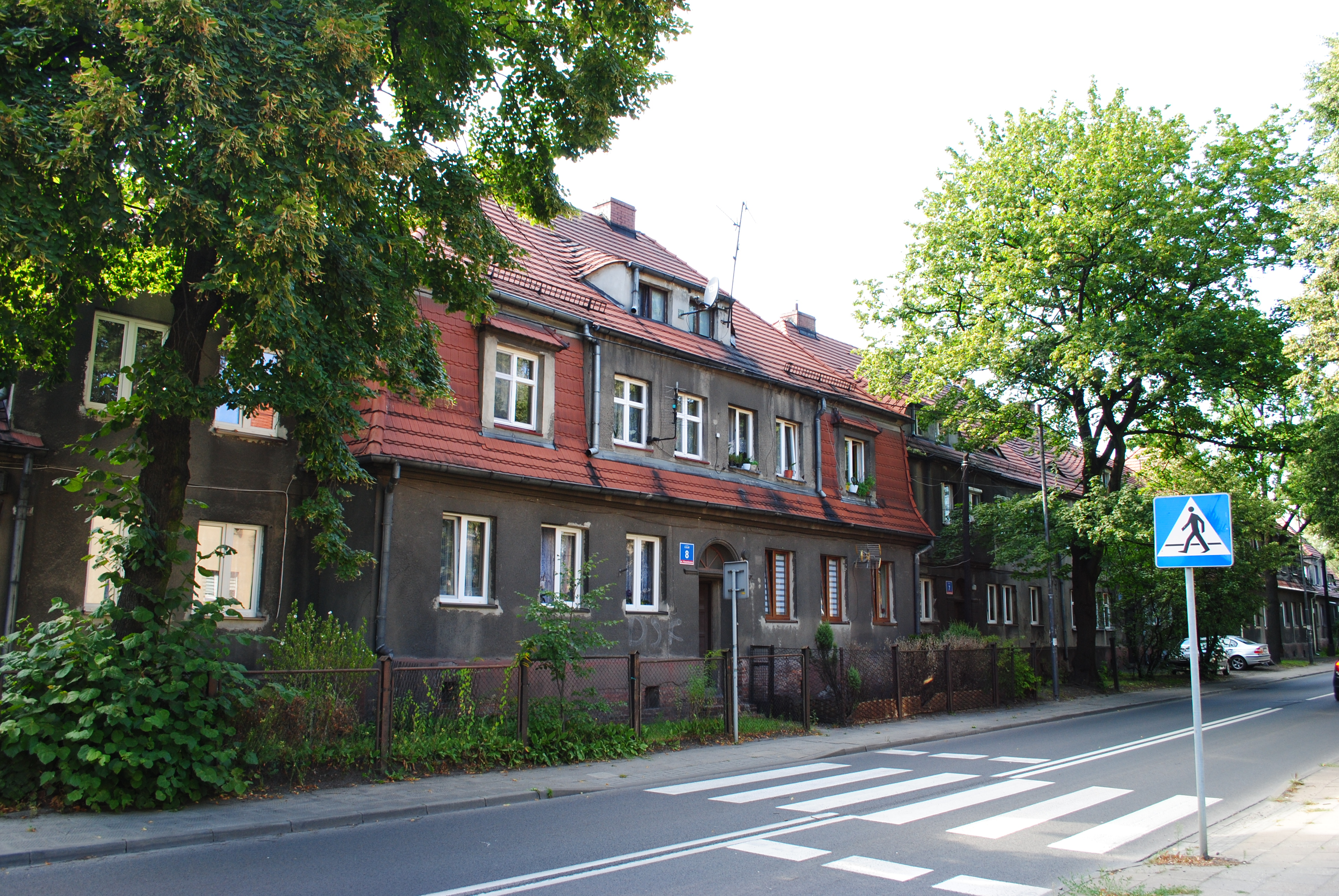
Complex of buildings of the Neubau housing estate
(Kosmiczna Street)

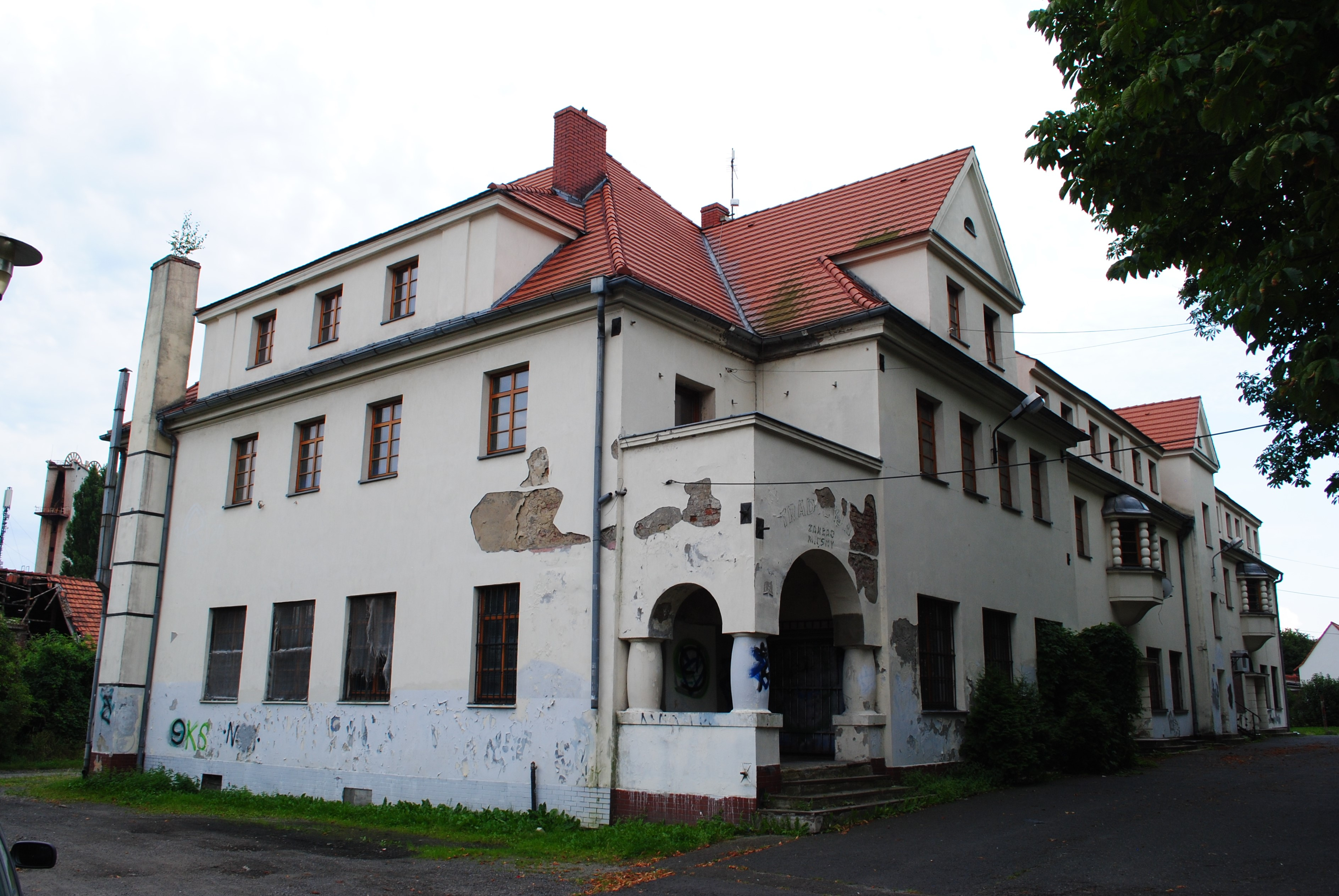
33, 34 and 34a Pod Kasztanami Street
(the building where paintings by Ewald Gawlik were collected)

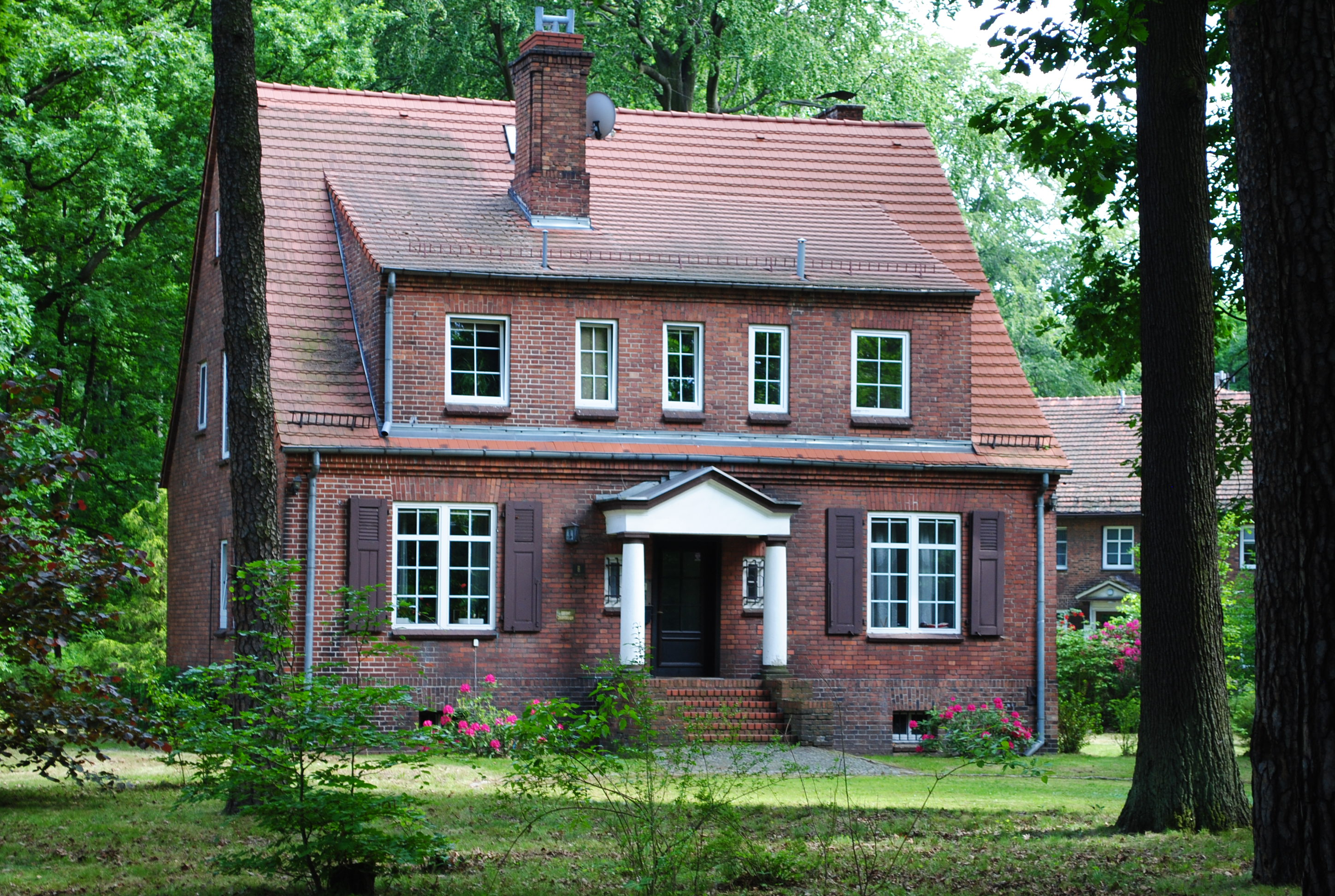
American Colony
(6 Górniczego Stanu Street)

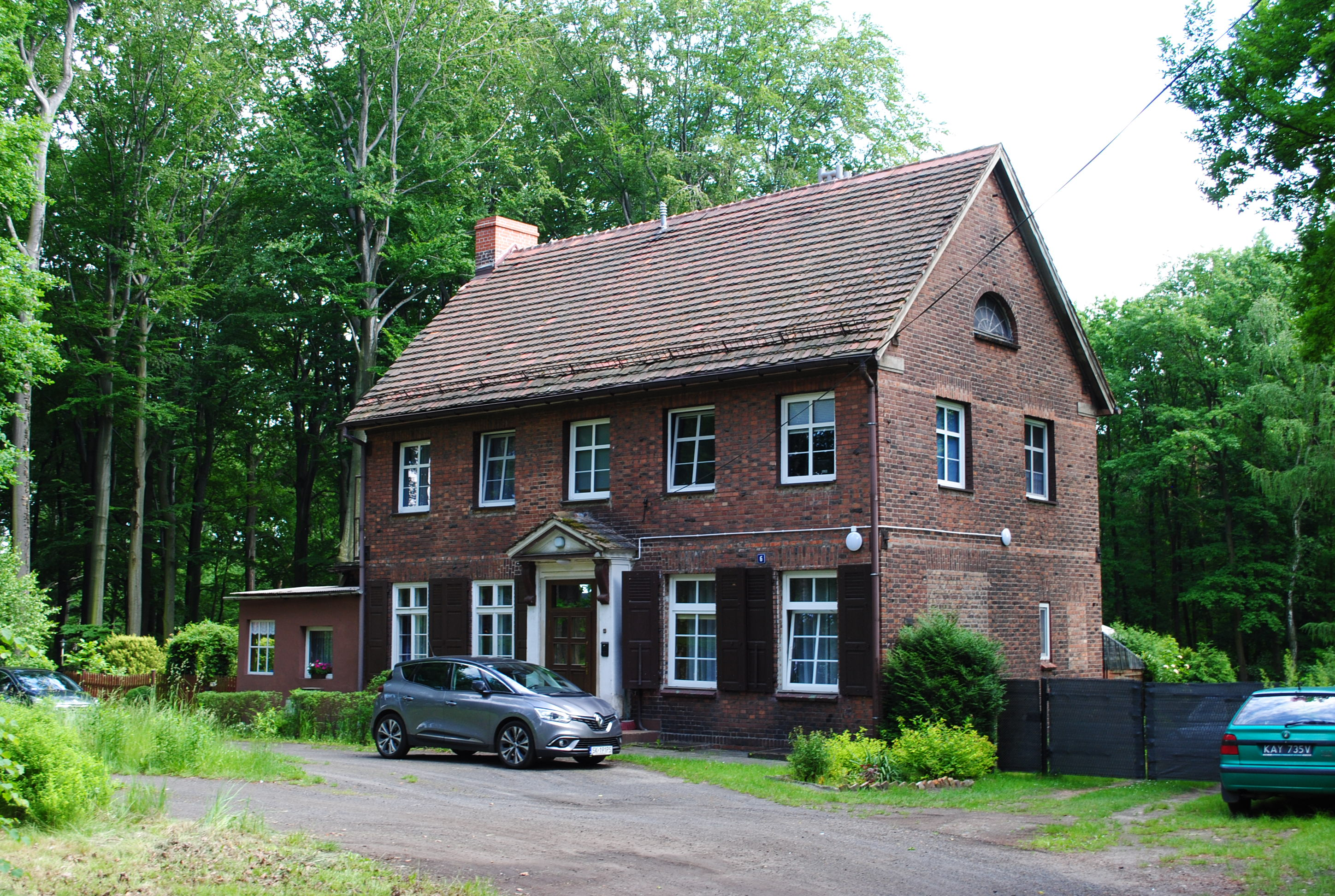
American Colony
(8 Górniczego Stanu Street)

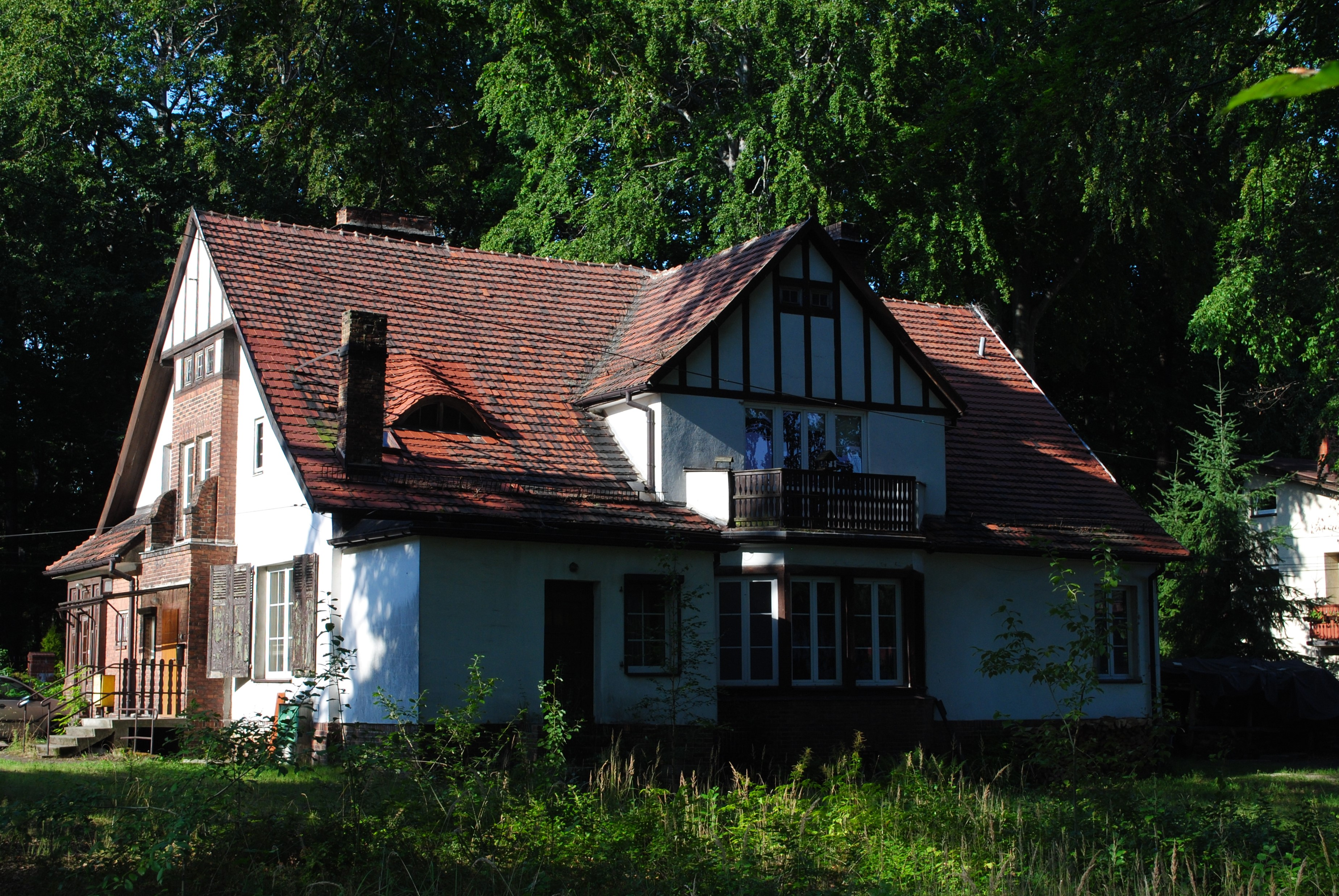
American Colony
(12 Górniczego Stanu Street)

After World War II, a new chapter began in the development of Giszowiec. By 1951, the Workers' Housing Construction Plant for the Wieczorek Coal Mine had completed new residential buildings on the eastern side of Giszowiec – 31 buildings were constructed at that time along present-day Kosmiczna, Sputników, and Pod Kasztanami streets. Architecturally, the buildings refer to the style of the neighbouring interwar-era structures. At the turn of the 1950s and 1960s, identical single-family homes were built on Górniczego Stanu and Sosnowa streets. Further development intensified after 1959, when the Staszic Coal Mine opened near the settlement. The first larger multi-family buildings began to be erected in the 1960s near the mine, on the north side of Mysłowicka Street and along the newly laid-out Karliczka Street. Initially, low, two-story apartment blocks were built. In 1960, buildings for 48 families were completed; a year later, 64 apartments were delivered on Mysłowicka Street, and in the year the Staszic Coal Mine began operations, 51 apartments were completed. These buildings had numerous defects. The new residents, however, took care of the public space around the new buildings – trees and shrubs were planted, green spaces were laid out, and benches, swings, and sandboxes for children were installed; new sidewalks made of concrete slabs and cinder were built, and street lighting was installed. Later, the low-rise buildings, which at the time blended in with the historic district, were abandoned. As a result, the first 10-story buildings began to appear on Karliczka and Pszczyńska streets in the second half of the 1960s, and along with them, a kindergarten, an elementary school, a medical facility, and commercial pavilions were built. A four-classroom kindergarten opened in 1967, and a year later, a 15-classroom elementary school with specialized classrooms and a gymnasium. A teachers' residence was built for the staff, and a few years later, another school was constructed. Access roads, parking lots, street lighting, and street furniture were built around the new residential buildings. The houses were connected to utilities, and a biological-mechanical wastewater treatment plant was constructed. The existing potential for expansion of Giszowiec in the northern part of the district was exhausted by the mid-1970s. By 1974, cooperative and company-owned housing had been built on Karliczka and Mysłowicka Streets.

Buildings built in the 1950s and 1960s

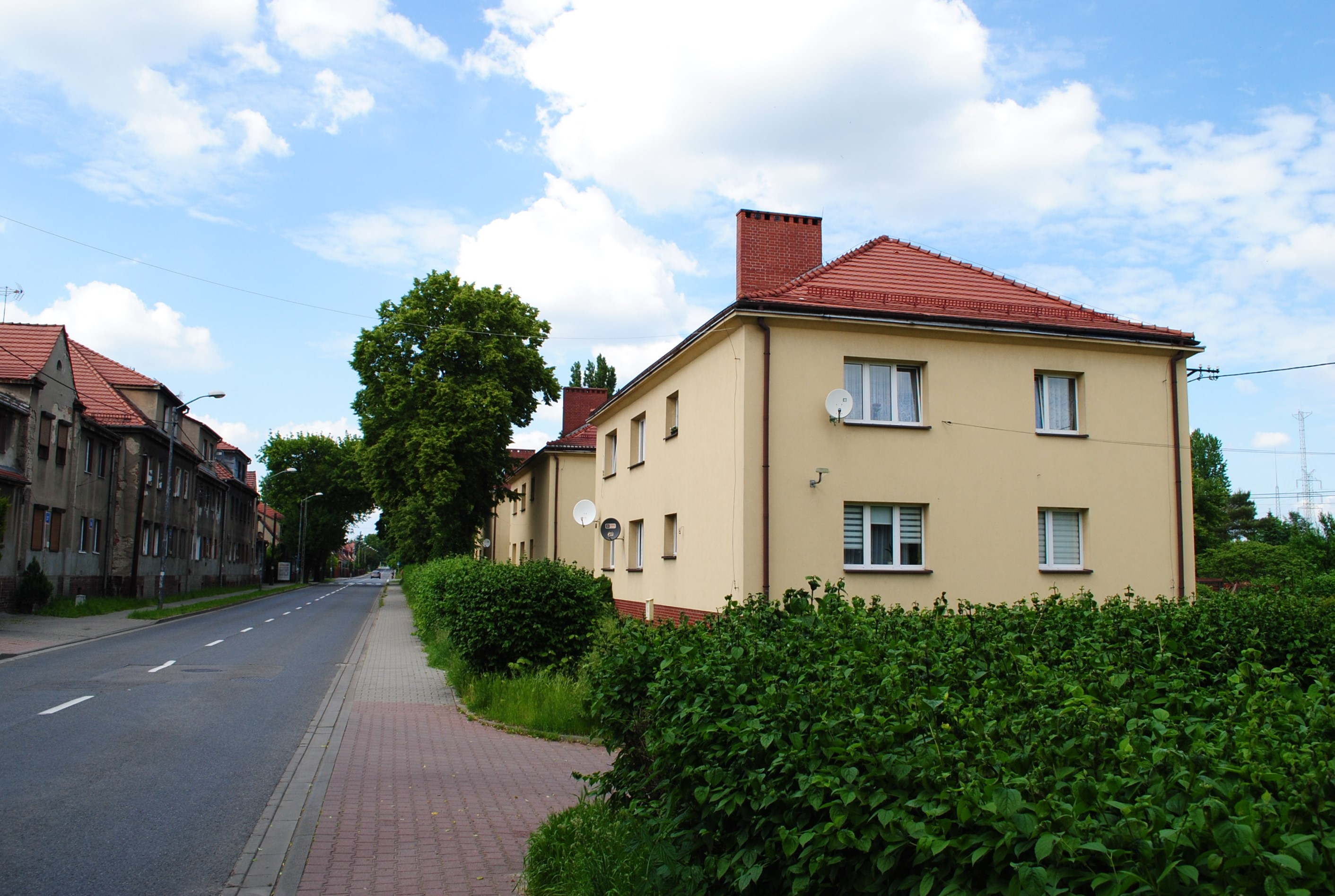
Buildings built by the Workers' Housing Construction Plant
(Kosmiczna Street)

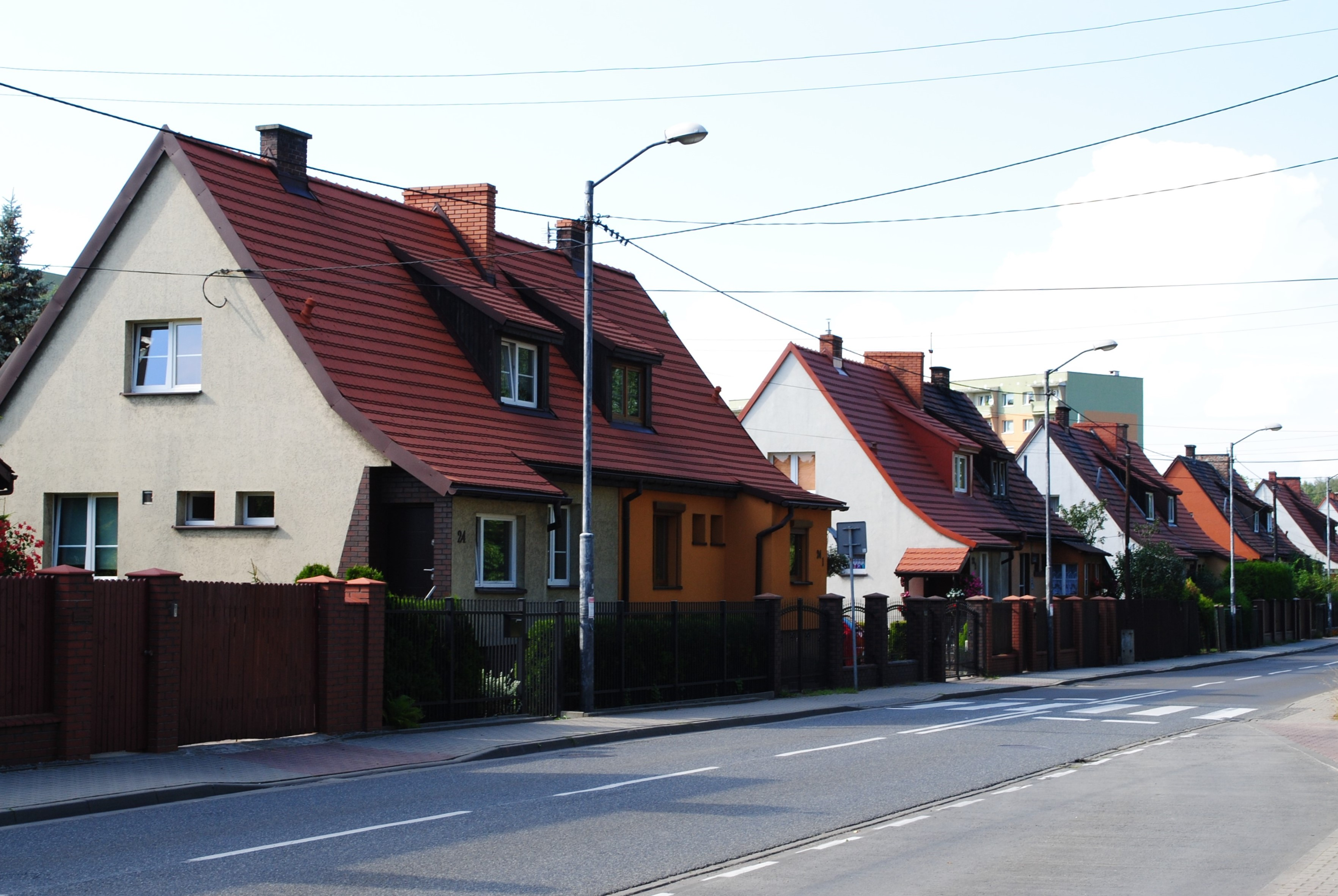
Buildings built by the Workers' Housing Construction Plant
(Kosmiczna Street)

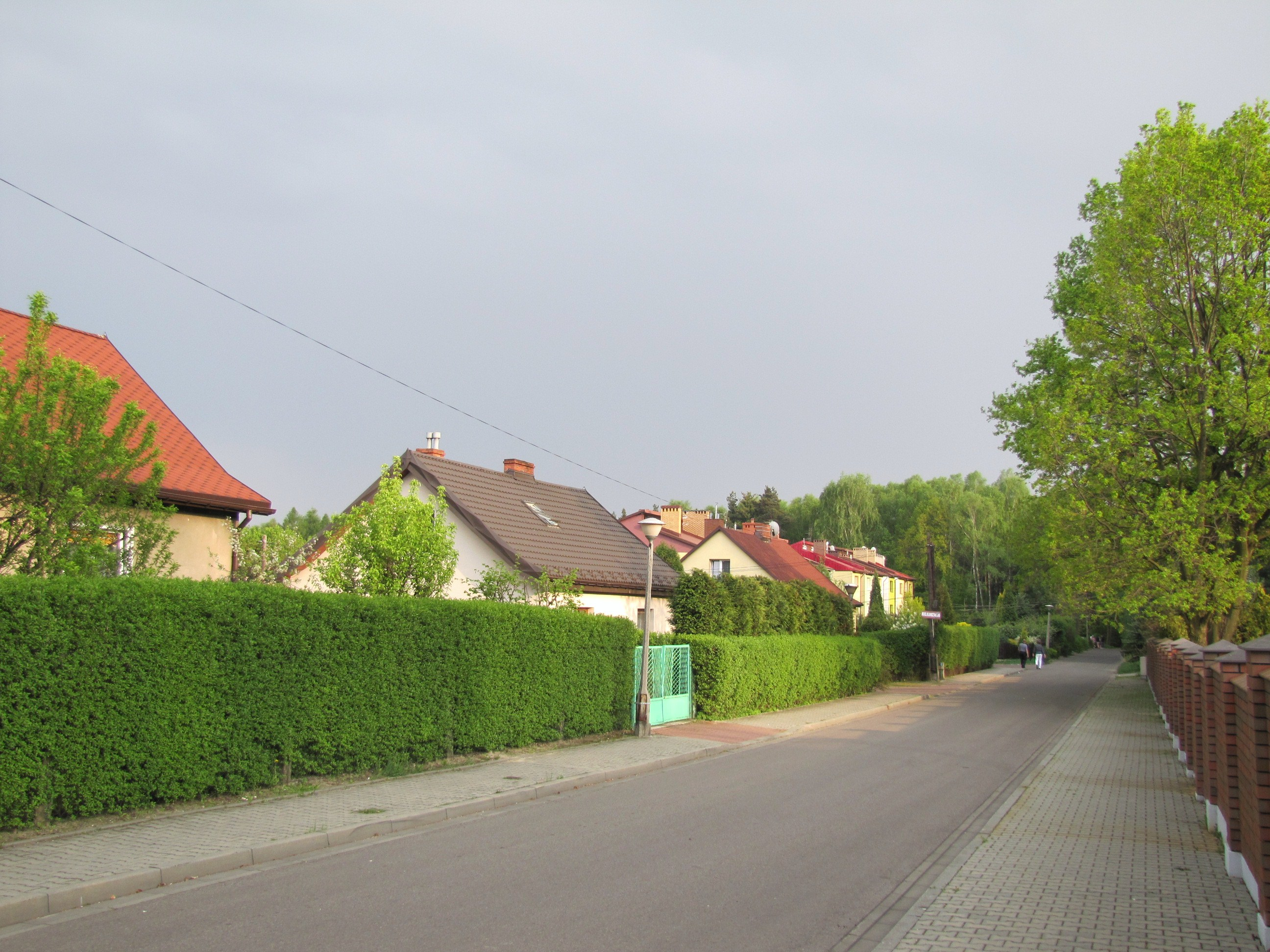
Barbórki Street

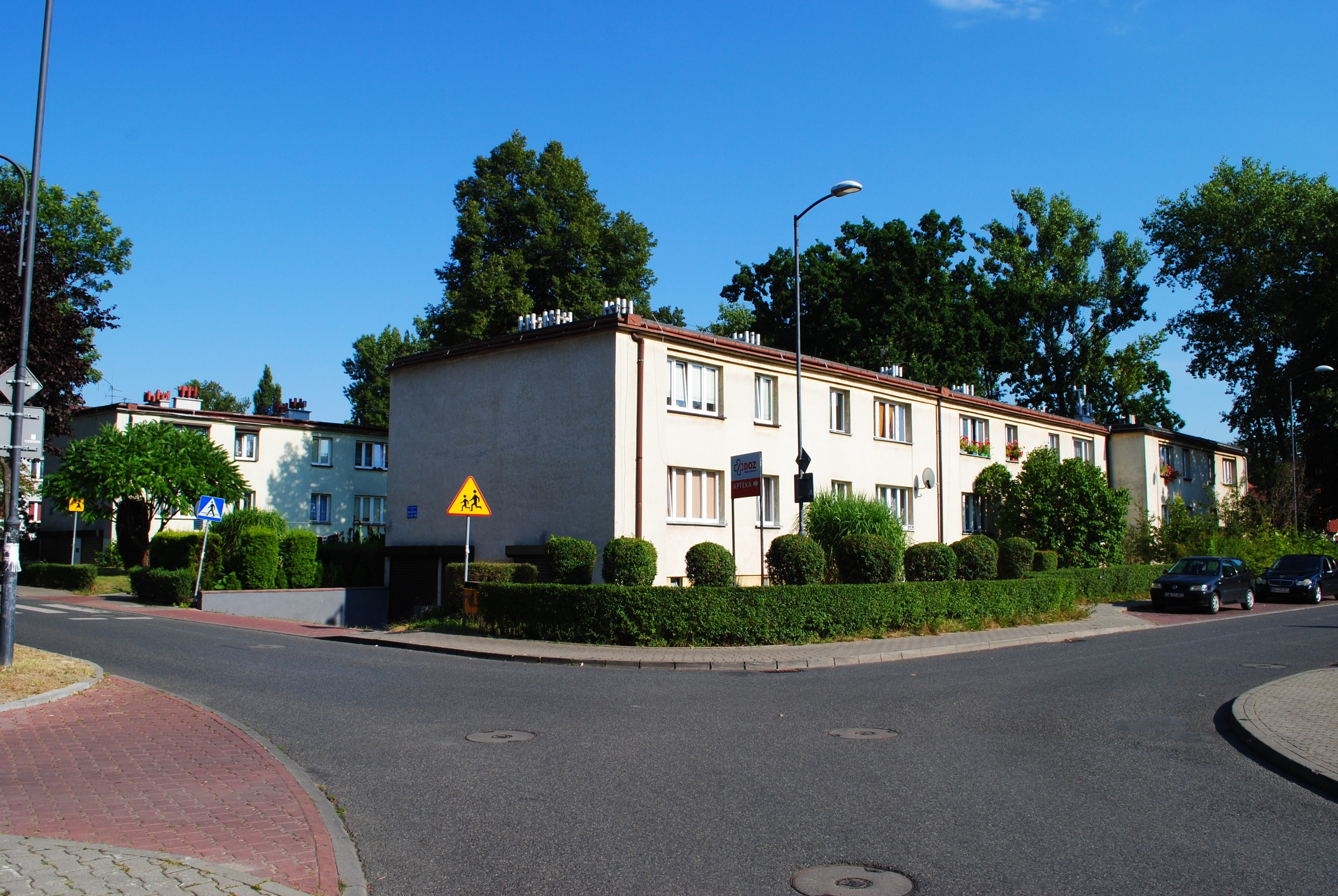
Mysłowicka Street / Karliczka Street

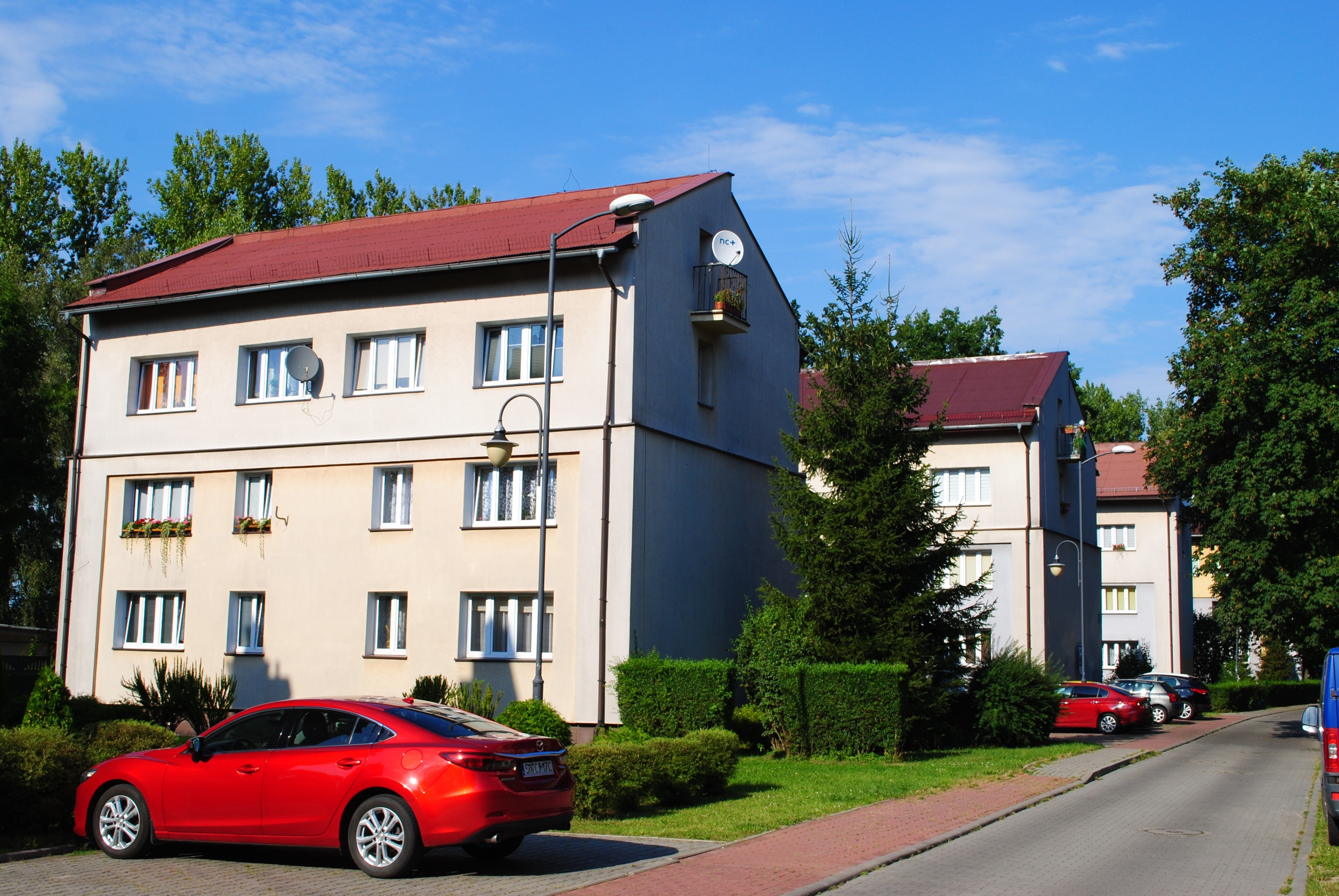
Karliczka Street

Housing needs remained unmet, as the available housing met at most one-third of the Staszic Coal Mine's labor force requirements; therefore, in order to provide housing for an ever-increasing number of miners, it was announced in October 1969 that a decision had been made to gradually demolish the old buildings in Giszowiec. The new housing estate was designed for 22,440 residents, and its area was to be 100 hectares. The first demolitions began in the fourth quarter of 1969. In place of the historic buildings in the western and northeastern parts of the old housing estate, a new estate consisting of 11-story high-rises was built (on Kolista, Mysłowicka, Wojciech, Miła, and Gościnna streets). As part of Housing Unit I, 1,697 apartments were completed between 1975 and 1979 in new apartment blocks on what was then Samoobrony Street (now Wojciech Street). In 1980, as part of the Housing Unit II, the first apartment blocks were built on what was then Ernst Thälmann (now Młodzieżowa Street) and Agata streets, housing 236 apartments. The demolitions were halted only after decisions by the historic preservation officer in 1978 and 1987. Only one-third of the housing estate was saved from destruction. Further development took place in the southern part of the district – between 1981 and 1983, as part of Housing Unit III, apartment blocks were built on Adama Street (Osiedle Adama was established at that time), as well as single-family homes on Sosnowa Street. Along with the changes in development after World War II, the communist authorities renamed the entire district – between 1979 and 1990, Giszowiec was known as the Stanisław Staszic Housing Estate. According to data from November 1983, the Stanisław Staszic Housing Estate included 5 buildings managed by the Staszic Coal Mine, containing 662 apartments, while the Katowice Housing Cooperative administered 28 buildings with 627 apartments.

Buildings built in the 1970s and 1980s

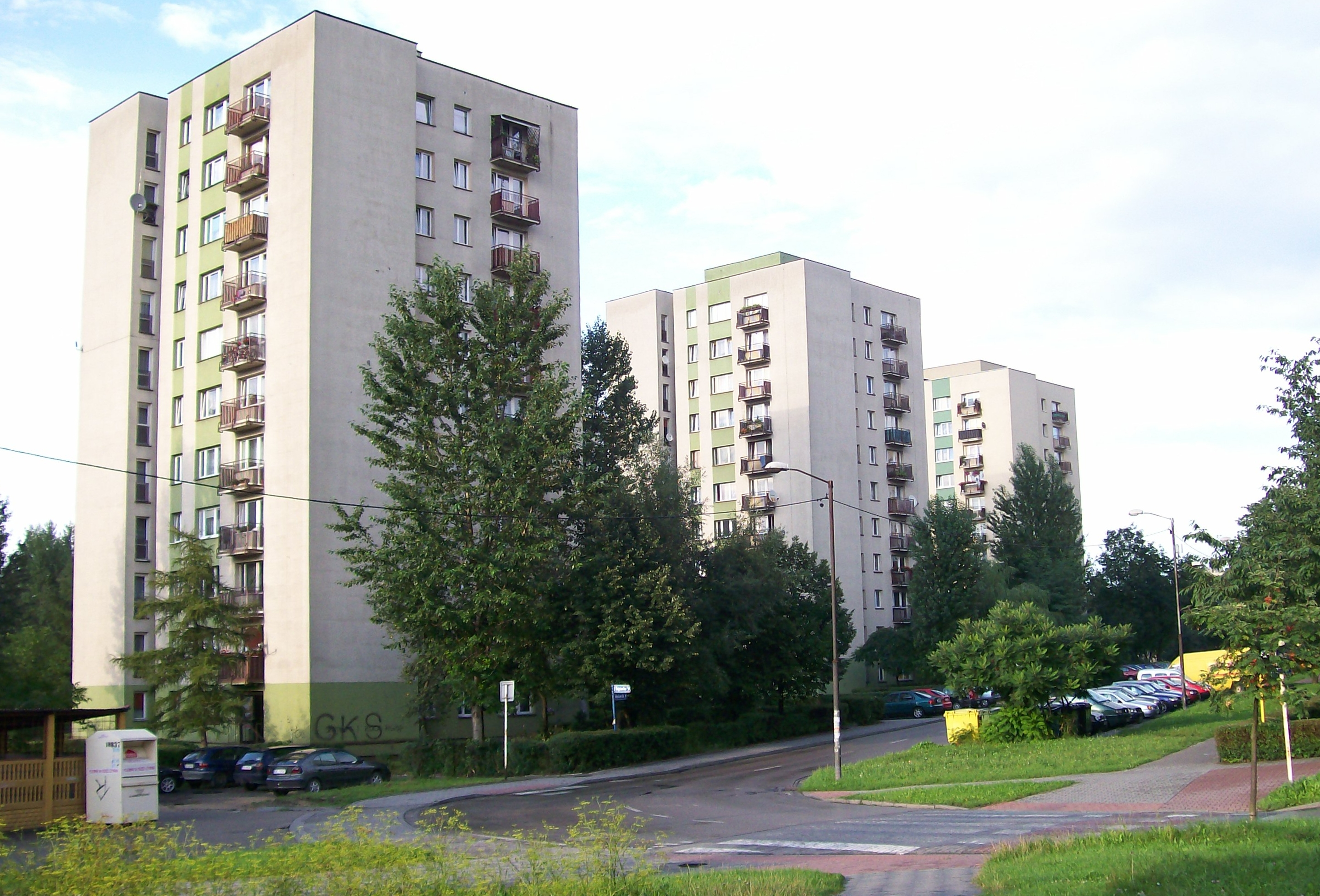
3, 5 and 9 Mysłowicka Street

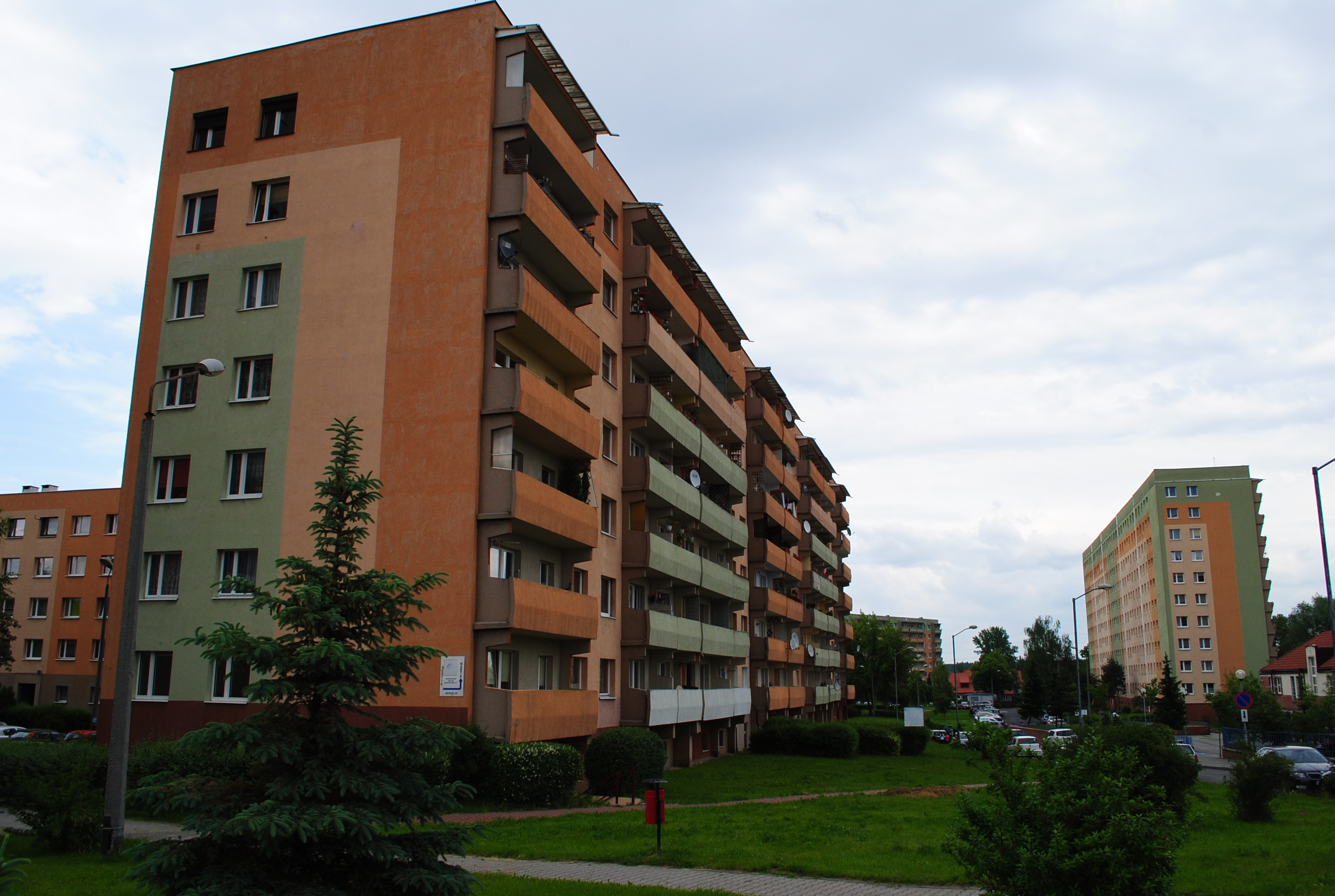
Miła Street

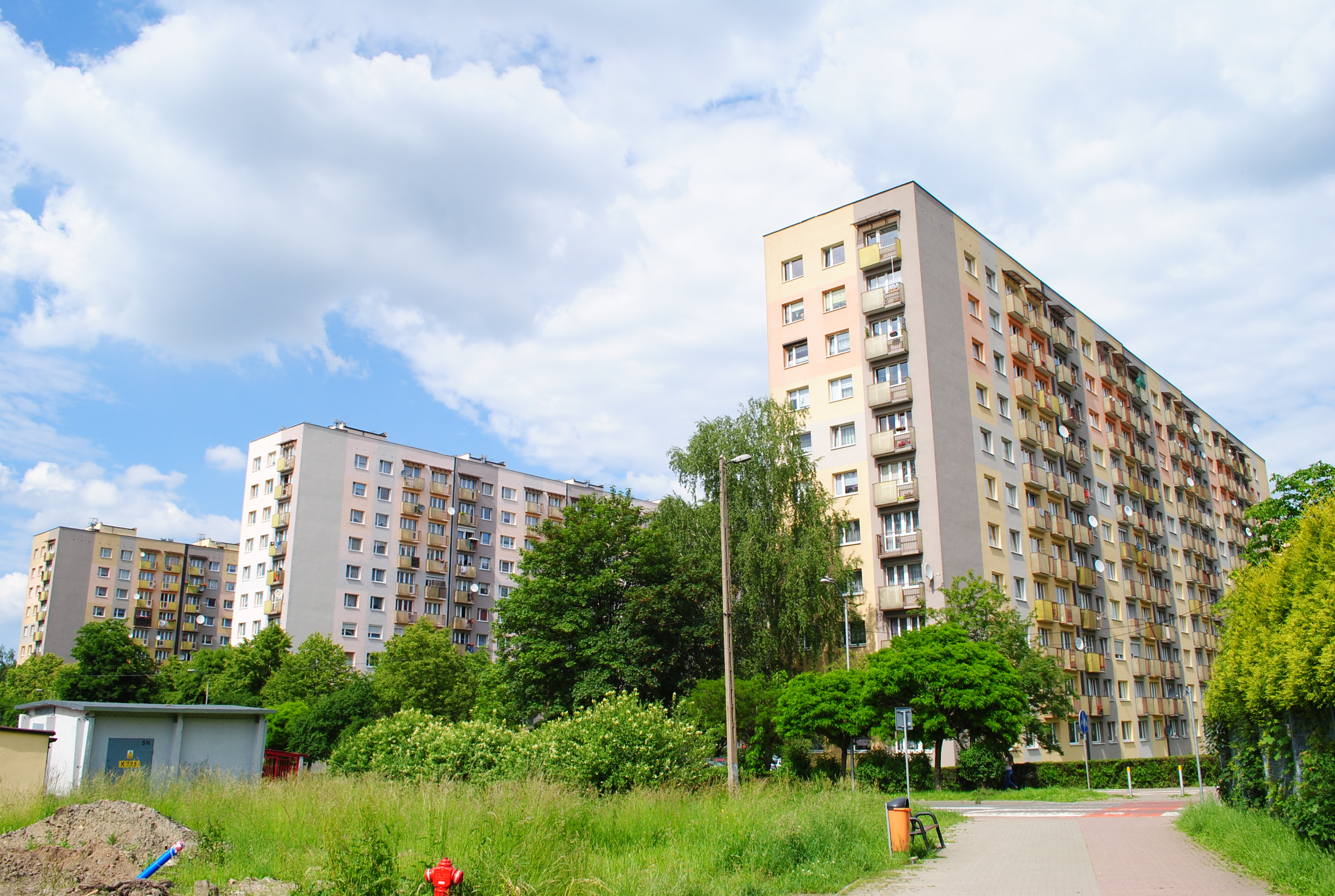
Wojciech Street

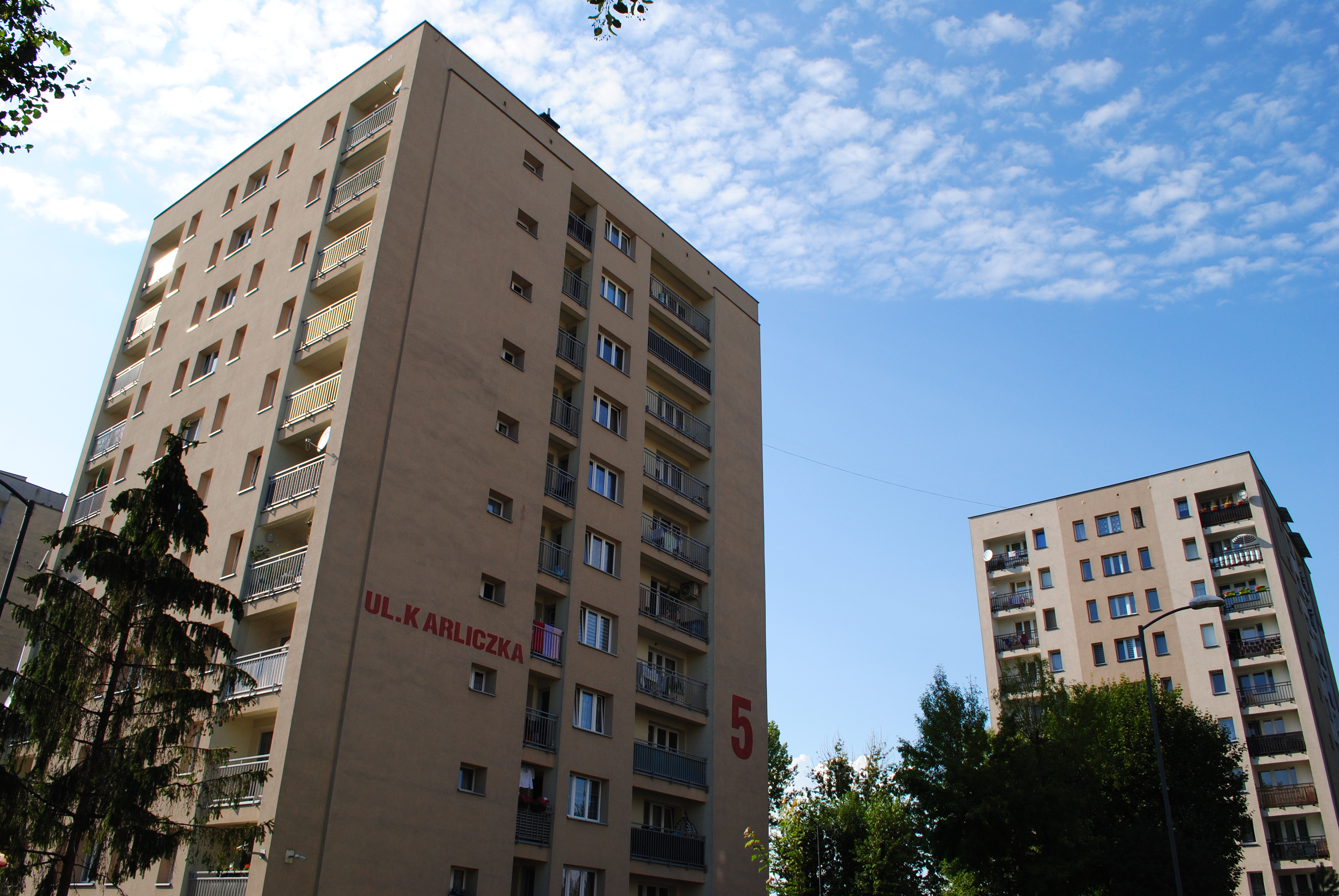
Karliczka Street

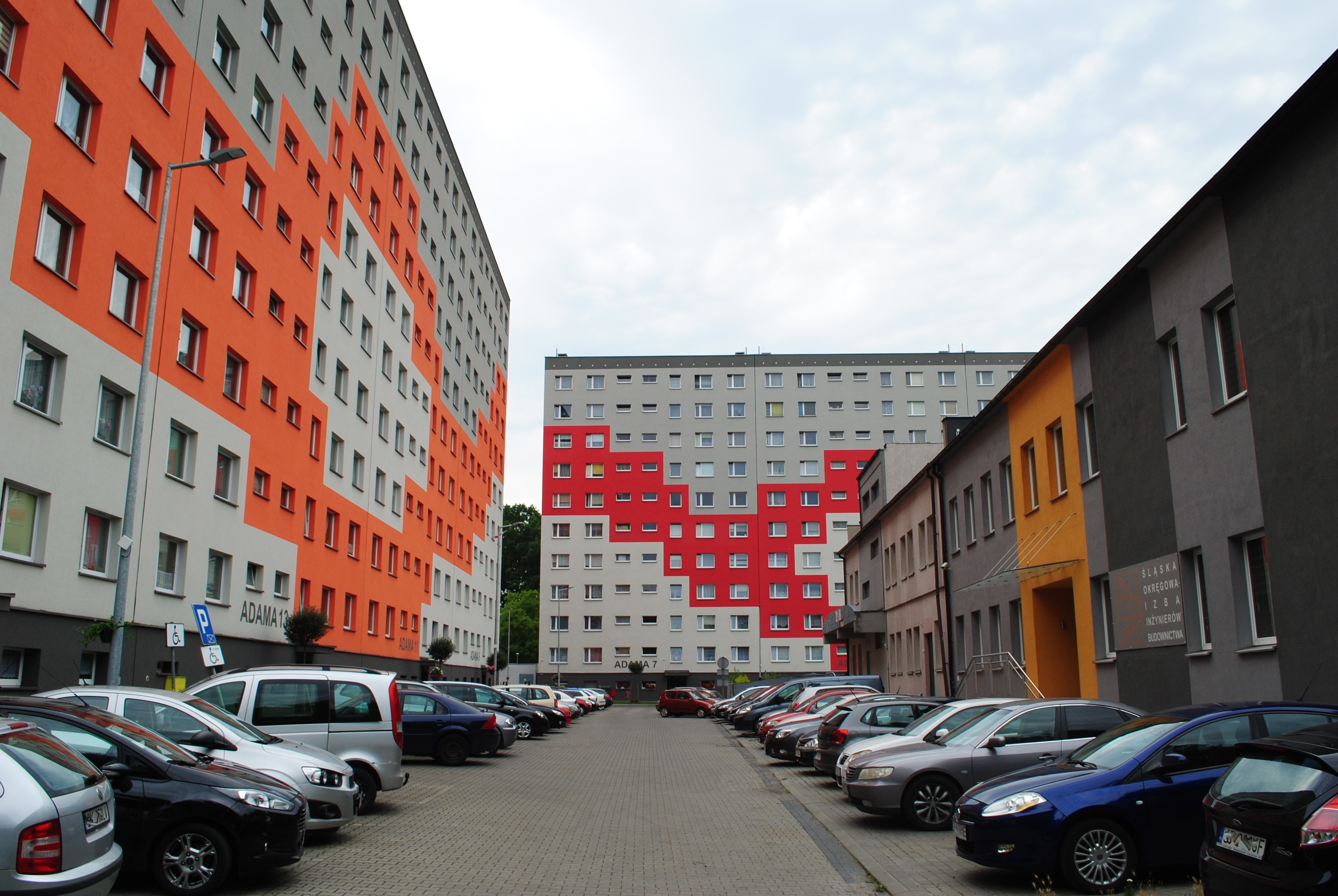
Adam Street
(fragment of Osiedle Adama)

Between 2003 and 2004, in the immediate vicinity of the Neubau housing estate, within the area bounded by Pod Kasztanami, Kosmiczna, Działkowa, and Górniczego Stanu streets, the Katowice Social Housing Association built a new housing estate called Kasztany. 9 houses for 200 families, as well as 2 commercial units and garages, were constructed. The architecture of the new housing estate, especially its size, shape, and roofing, echoes the neighboring historic part of Giszowiec. On the ground floor of each of the nine buildings, one apartment has been adapted for people with disabilities who use wheelchairs. Inside the housing estate, a playground for children and a sports field were built, and a green belt was designated. Roads intended solely for pedestrian and bicycle traffic were also constructed.

The next phase of the Katowice Social Housing Association's project was the construction, between 2017 and 2019, of the Pod Kasztanami housing estate, located at the intersection of Górniczego Stanu and Pod Kasztanami streets. It consists of four buildings containing 24 apartments, whose architecture also echoes the historic buildings of Giszowiec. These apartments have access to a private garden, and the entire housing estate is equipped with parking spaces and a playground. In February 2023, construction was completed on the Przyjazny Zakątek housing estate, developed in the area of Przyjazna and Działkowa Streets by the Katowice-based TBS. It consists of four buildings modeled after the historic architecture of Giszowiec, housing 16 two-story apartments with a garden, a garage, and a parking space.

Buildings built after 1989

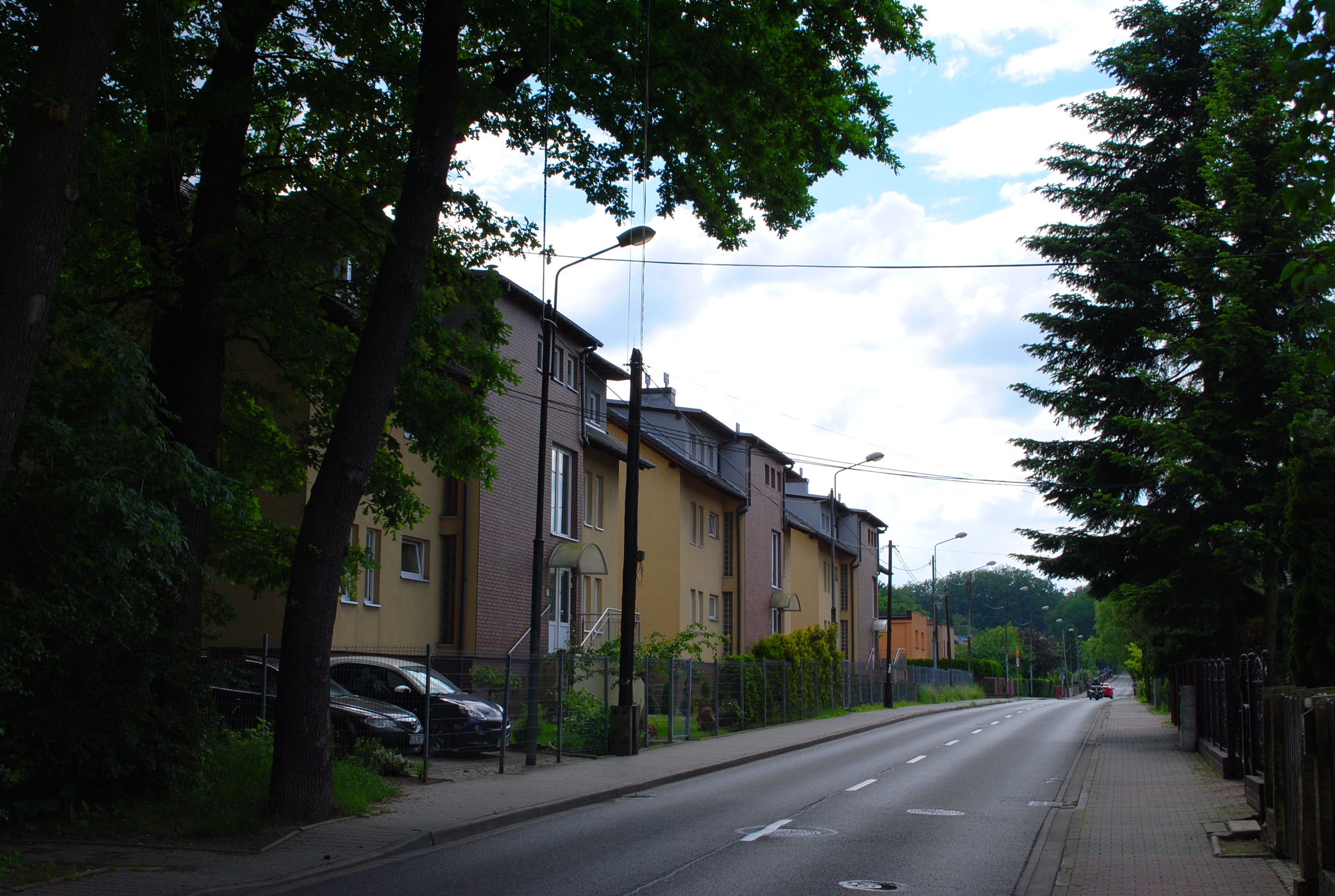
44, 46, and 48 Górniczego Stanu Street

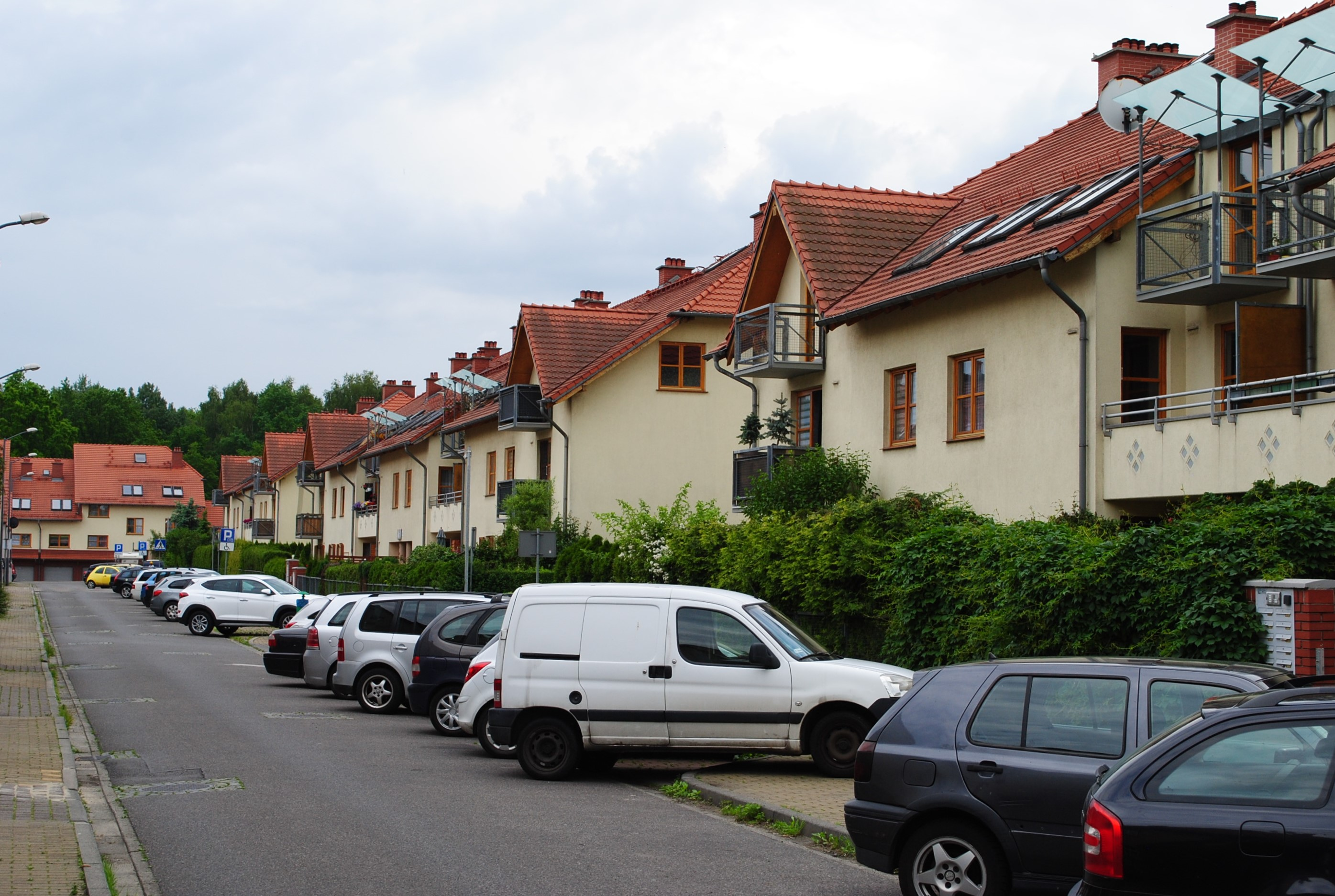
Kasztany housing estate
(Pod Kasztanami Street)

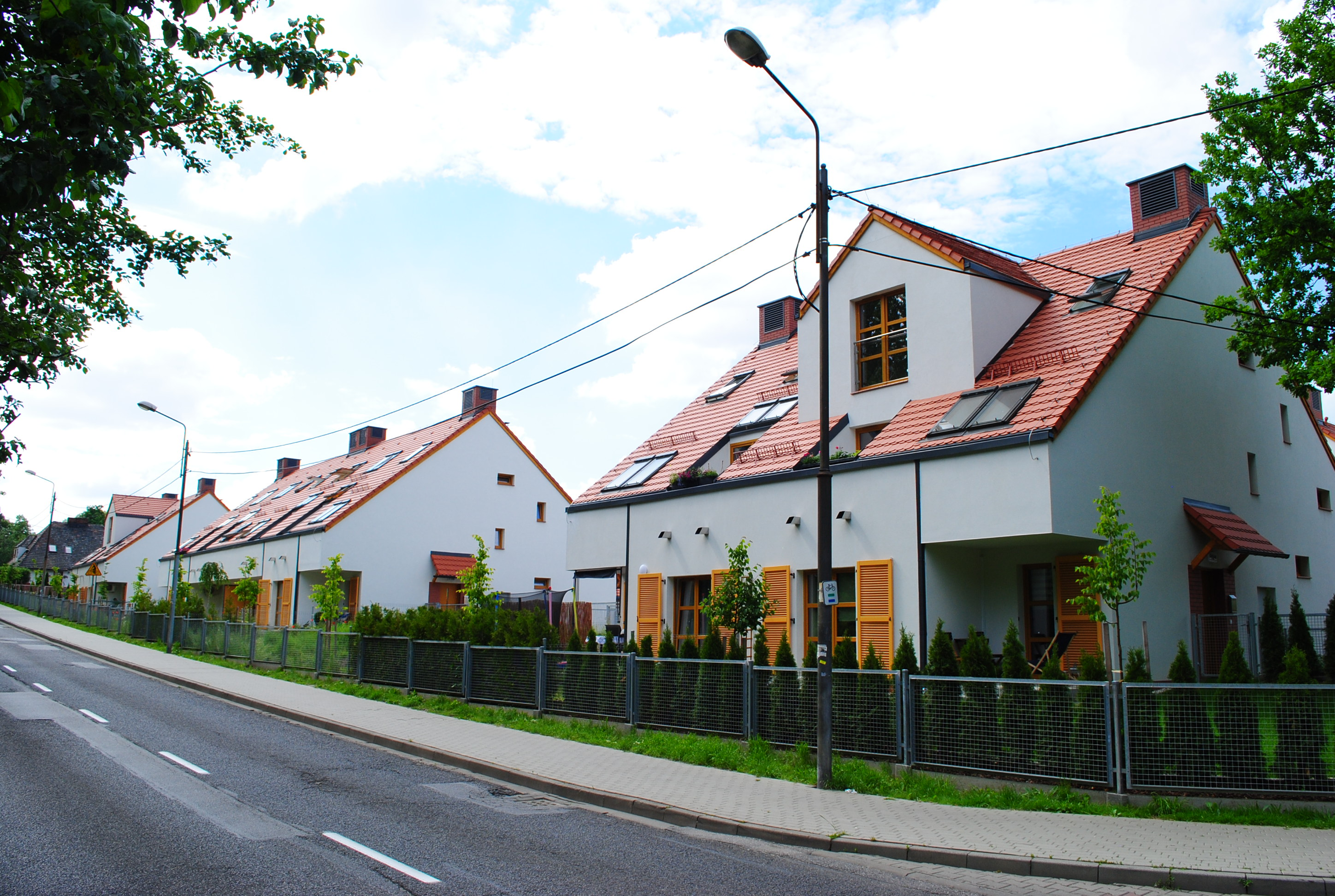
Pod Kasztanami housing estate
(Górniczego Stanu Street)

=== Historic sites ===
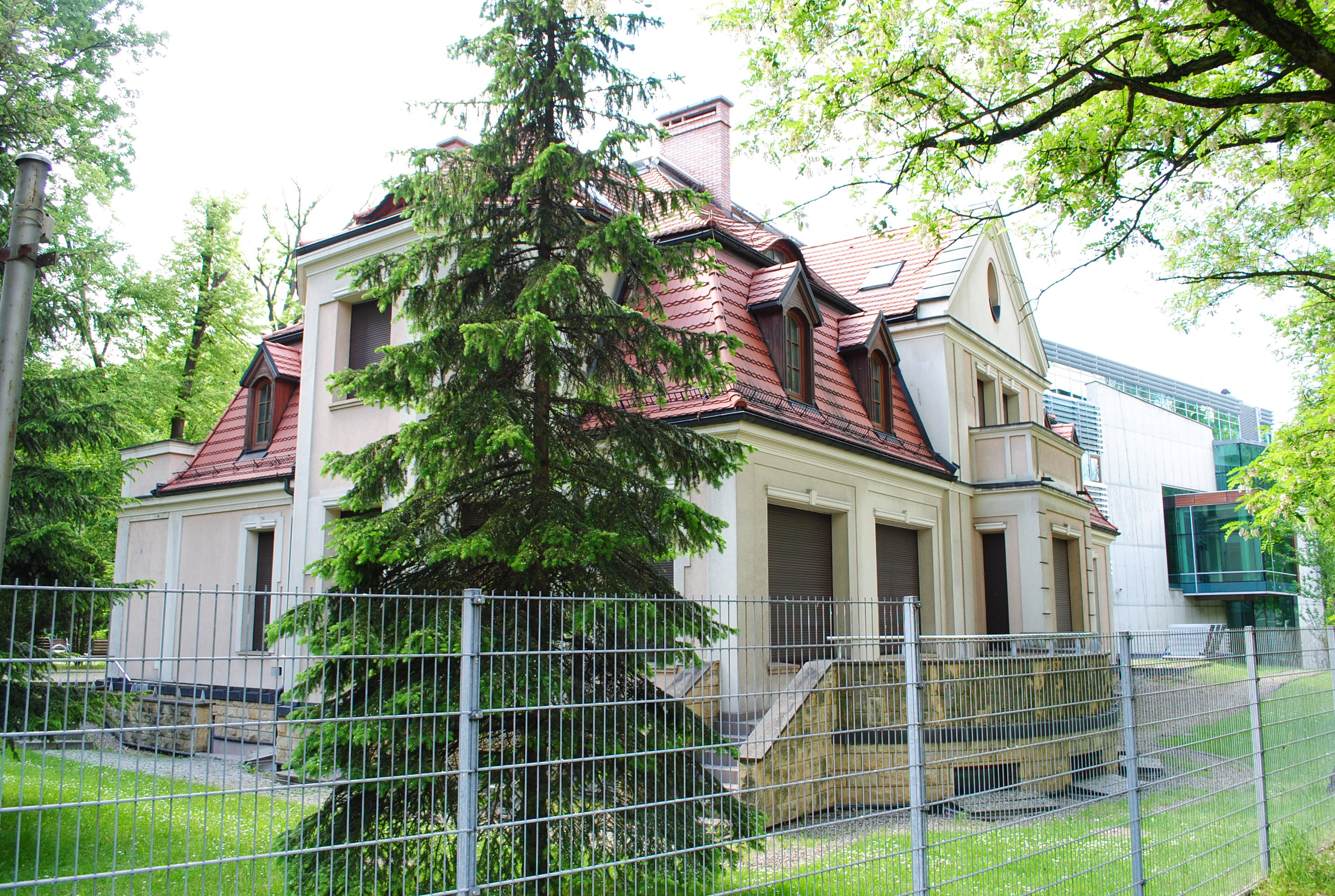
Villa of the Giesche Coal Mine director at 10 Pszczyńska Street

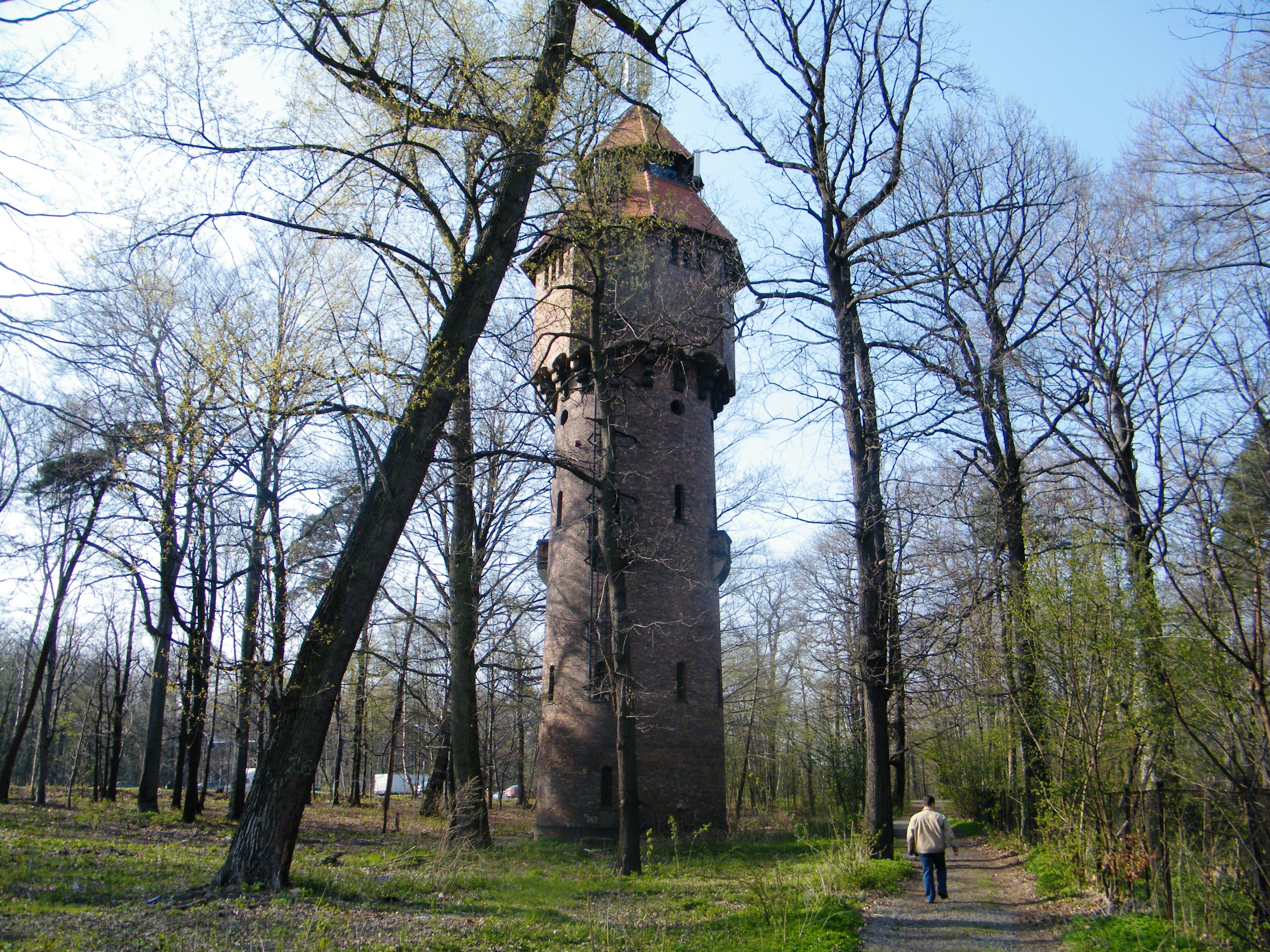
Water tower in Giszowiec on Pszczyńska Street

The Giszowiec district is home to many structures listed in the Registry of Cultural Property. Among them, the following are listed in the register:

- No. A/1229/78 of 18 August 1978 – Fragment of the Giszowiec workers' housing estate (along with 43 houses listed individually) built between 1907 and 1914 according to a design by architects Emil and Georg Zillmann, expanded between 1920 and 1924. The modern-style buildings exemplify the concept of garden cities. The housing estate is listed in the register together with the market square, school, administrative building (no longer standing), forest district office (currently a kindergarten), central park with an inn, a complex of bathhouse and laundry buildings, a complex of lodging houses with a canteen, a post office, and eight residential blocks. The protected area encompasses the urban layout, including existing buildings and organized green spaces, bounded by the following streets: Mysłowicka, the western frontage of Pod Lipami Square (along the plot boundaries on Młodzieżowa Street), along Pod Lipami Square, Barbórki Street, and Górniczego Stanu, Wesołowska, and Przyjazna streets, to Działkowa Street with buildings on both sides and the outer edges of the park along Gościnna Street.
- No. A/1348/87 of 23 June 1987 – Built between 1907 and 1940 according to designs by the Zillmann architects and the Construction Office of the Giesche Coal Mine – the so-called new development (Neubau) – as well as by an anonymous architect employed by SACO – the so-called American Colony. The buildings display a modern style with romantic, neoclassical, Baroque Revival and Art Nouveau elements. A section of the Giszowiec workers' housing estate is protected, including its urban layout along with the existing buildings and greenery located in the southwestern part of the complex of the so-called American Colony on Górniczego Stanu Street.
- No. A/1290/82 of 20 May 1982 – A modern residential and commercial building from the first quarter of the 20th century at 7–10 Pod Lipami Square.
- No. A/1628/96 of 29 March 1996; A/660/2020 of 2 June 2020 – Villa of the Giesche Coal Mine director, built between 1907 and 1910 according to a design by the Zillmanns in the modern style at 10 Pszczyńska Street.
- No. A/14172/90 of 29 October 1990 – A water tower built in 1908, in the Historicist style with elements of Renaissance Revival, on Pszczyńska Street.

=== Monuments and commemorative plaques ===
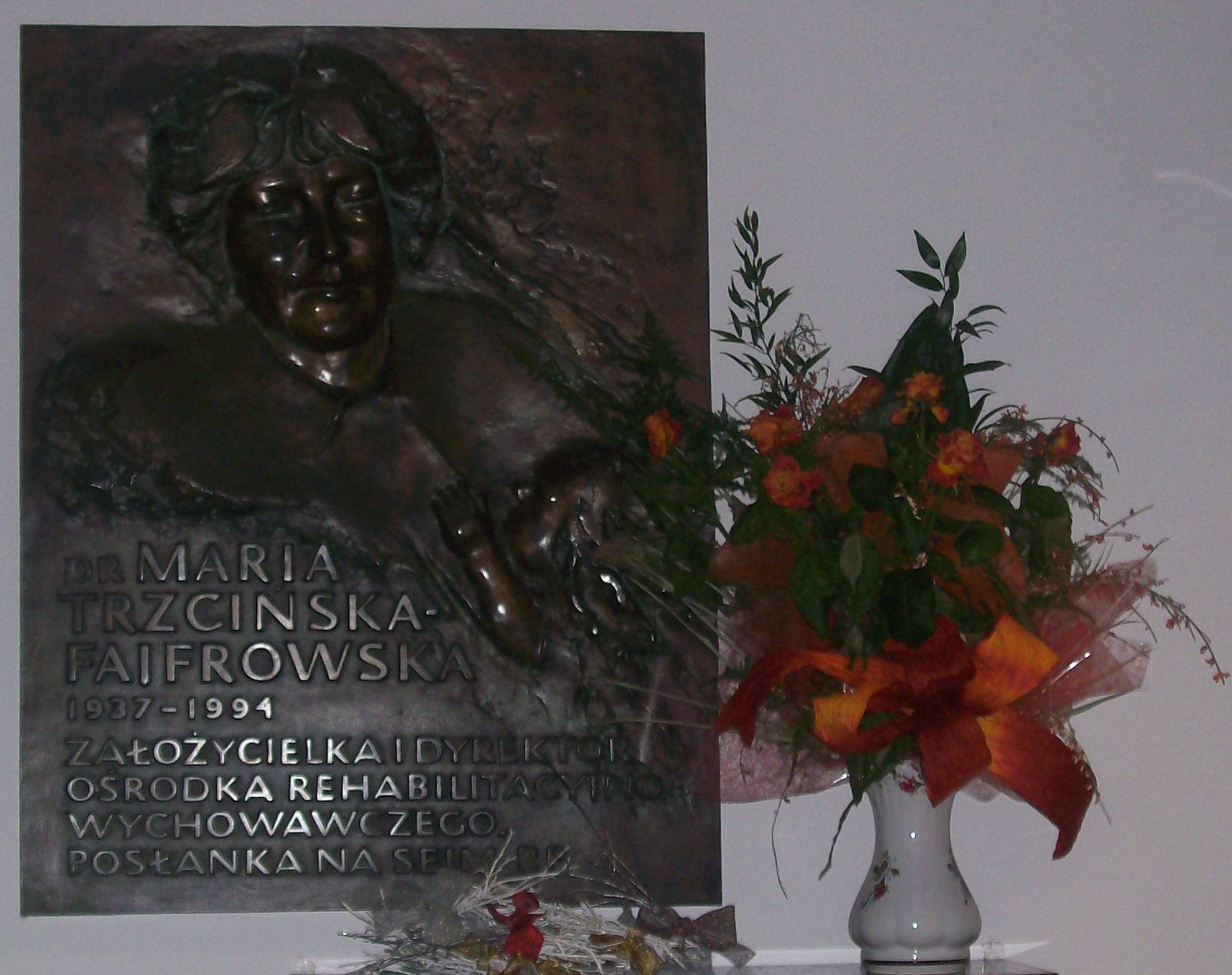
Plaque commemorating Maria Trzcińska-Fajfrowska

The following monuments and commemorative plaques are located in Giszowiec:

- Monument honoring those who died in the Silesian Uprisings and were murdered in Nazi camps during World War II,
- A plaque commemorating Maria Trzcińska-Fajfrowska, founder of the Special Care Home in Giszowiec,
- A plaque commemorating the soldiers of the Silesian District of the Home Army who were murdered in prisons and camps and who died in the forests of Giszowiec in April 1944,
- A bust of Anton Uthemann, the initiator of the founding of Giszowiec.

=== Zoning ===
Within the spatial structure of Katowice, Giszowiec and Nikiszowiec are residential districts located in the southeastern part of the city; they were developed as part of the construction of company housing estates associated with the Giesche Coal Mine (Wieczorek), and Giszowiec itself underwent significant expansion in the 1960s and 1970s. In terms of the proportion of built-up area relative to the total land area, Giszowiec is close to the average for Katowice as a whole (21% in Giszowiec; for Katowice as a whole, the proportion is 23%). The weighted average number of stories in buildings in Giszowiec was 1.90 in 2007. Among the housing estates built from the 1960s to the 1980s, Osiedle Adama has the highest building density in Katowice.

In terms of land use, Giszowiec is the district in Katowice with the second-highest proportion of forest (nearly 70% of the district's area; in Murcki, 86%). In terms of single-family residential development, apart from the western and southern districts, it is the only one with a total area exceeding 25 ha. A significant portion of Giszowiec is also occupied by industrial and commercial areas (50–100 ha). Overall, the functional-spatial structure of Giszowiec is dominated by forests with a total area of 834.2 ha. In addition, the largest areas are occupied by: industrial and service areas for manufacturing plants, technical infrastructure, and municipal facilities (69.1 ha), residential areas with high (59.3 ha) and low (48.3 ha) development density, agricultural land (29.8 ha), areas with mixed economic functions dominated by commerce, warehouses, and non-intrusive manufacturing facilities (15.2 ha), railway land (14.6 ha), and landscaped green areas (11.3 ha).

== Education ==
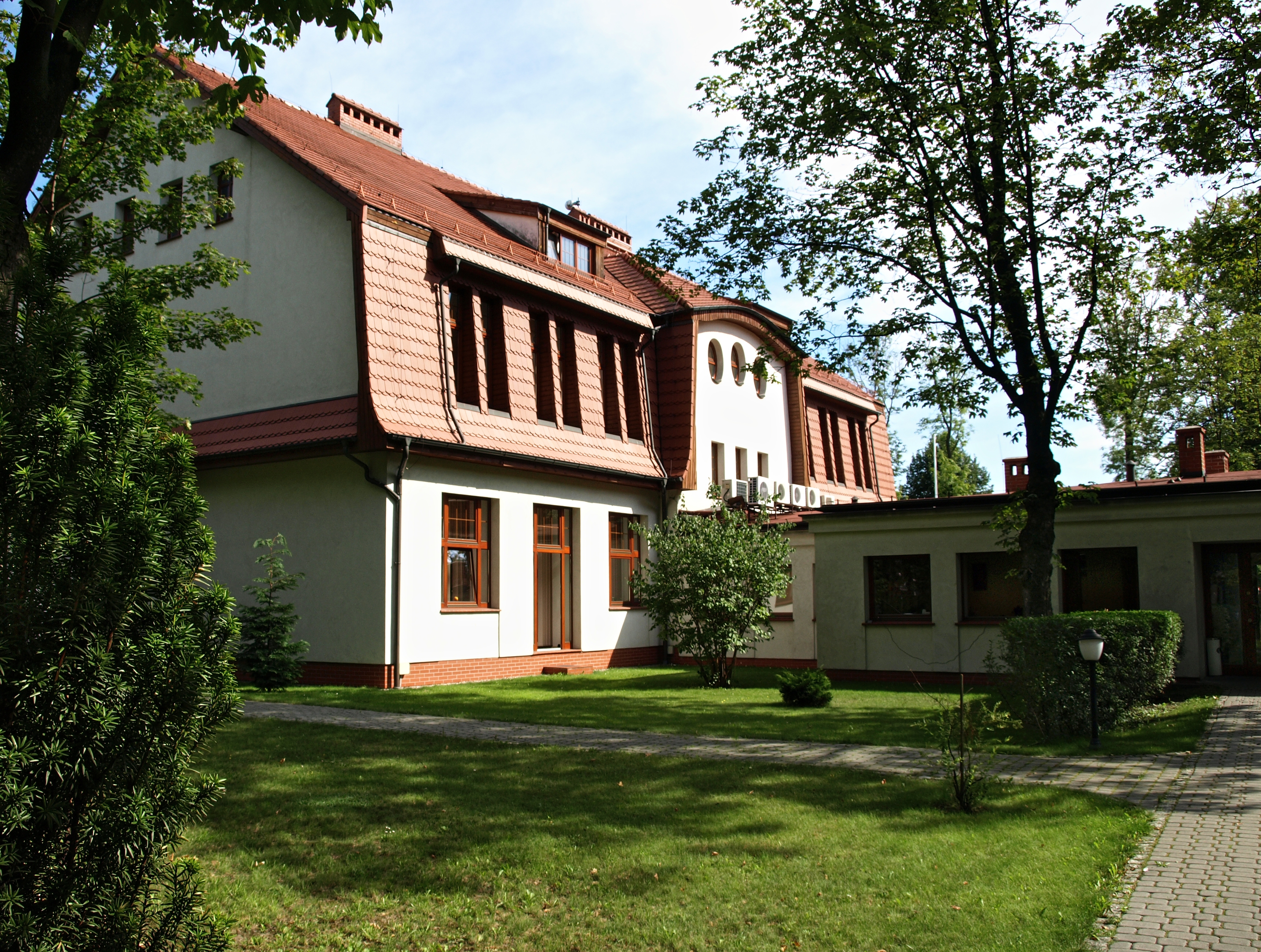
Old school at 5 Pod Lipami Square

The first school in Giszowiec, a Catholic elementary school, opened on 19 October 1908 in a building on Pod Lipami Square. At that time, 55 students began their studies in a single building under the supervision of two teachers. The remaining two buildings were put into use in 1913. At that time, four classes were organized in two of the buildings, and eight classes in the third. In 1910, a home economics school was established, and a year later, instruction began at a vocational training school. On 1 April 1917, classes began at the Evangelical school built on present-day Działkowa Street, and a room designated for religious worship was set up on the ground floor of the building. Until 1922, classes were conducted only in German, and the youth were educated in the Prussian tradition. After Giszowiec was incorporated into Poland in 1922, a Polish school was established in these buildings, and St. Stanislaus Kostka became its patron. During the interwar period, a school for German children also operated there. In 1923, 863 students attended the Polish school in Giszowiec, and 322 attended the German school. On 4 February 1926, a kindergarten was established in the building of the former Evangelical school, which was later moved to the public school. In 1928, approximately 700 students attended the Polish school, while 170 attended the German school. In early October 1935, the Polish school was divided into two institutions – St. Stanislaus Kostka Public School No. 6 (for boys) and Public School No. 7 (for girls) were established at that time. In 1937, the Evangelical school was closed; prior to its closure, the school had two sections: Polish and German. In 1939, 336 students attended the Polish school.

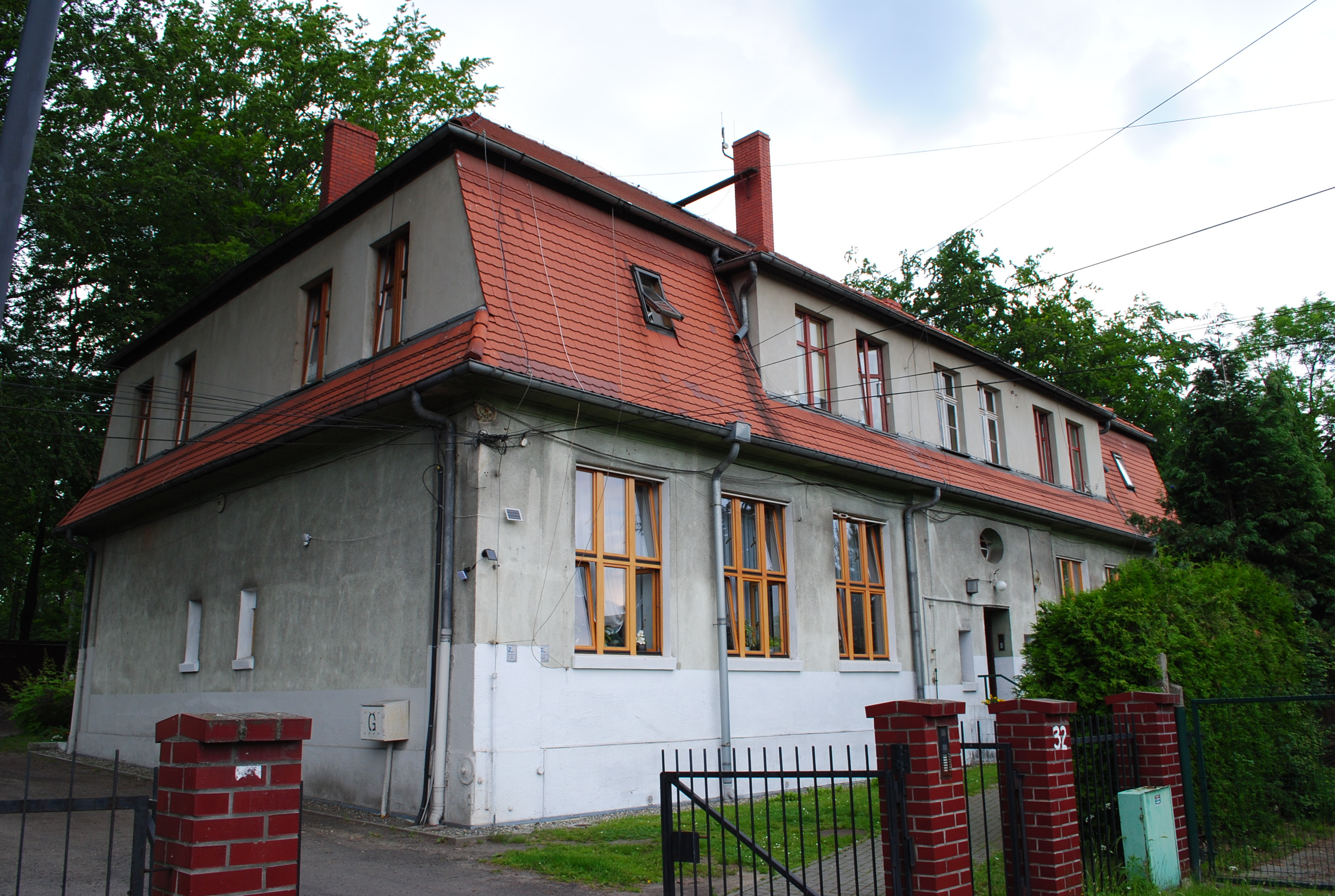
Former Evangelical school on Działkowa Street

In the fall of 1939, during the German occupation of Giszowiec, the Polish school system was abolished. A German school was opened on 1 February 1940. It was named after Hermann Göring. Robert Porrmann, a native of Lower Silesia, became the school's director and later its principal. On the day of the inauguration, 70 children were enrolled; by 9 April, there were already 580. In January 1945, the German teachers left Giszowiec.

After World War II, in late February 1945, the Polish school, then numbered 5, resumed operations. In 1946, it had 579 students. After Giszowiec was incorporated into Szopienice, the number was changed to 16, and in 1959, the school was named after Maria Konopnicka. Following its incorporation into Katowice on 31 December 1959, the school's number was changed again – to 54. With the development of housing construction and the growing demand for children's education, the school was moved to a new location at present-day 9 Wojciecha Street in 1978, but due to a continuing shortage of space, classes resumed in the old school at 5 Pod Lipami Square in September 1981. Primary School No. 51 was established at that time and named after Frédéric Chopin. On 1 September 1968, Primary School No. 52, named after the Union of Youth Struggle, began operations. The school, which no longer exists, was located on Karliczka Street.

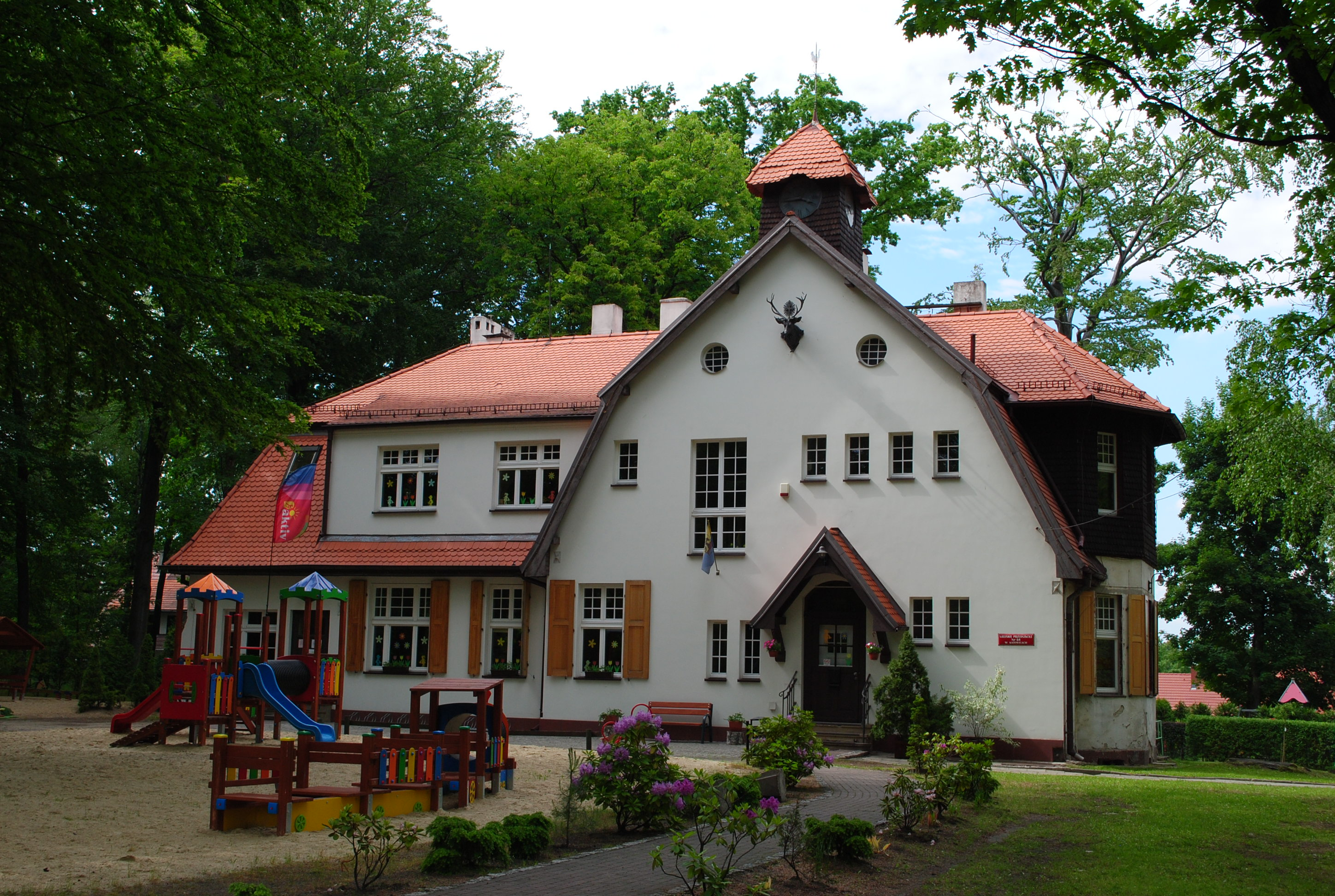
Municipal Kindergarten No. 64, located at 2 Pod Lipami Square, in the building of a former forester's lodge

In 1993, Primary School No. 51 finally moved into its new building at 7a Przyjazna Street. On 12 October of that year, students in the lower grades began their education in the new building. The school's designers were Stanisław Niemczyk and Marek and Anna Kuszewski, who won the competition for the development plan for this part of Giszowiec. On 1 September 2019, School and Kindergarten Complex No. 13 was established, formed by the merger of Primary School No. 51 with kindergartens No. 61 and 91.

In the postwar years, as the population grew, new kindergartens were also opened. The first one began operating immediately after the end of World War II in the building of the former Evangelical school. This kindergarten was first moved to the former villa of the director of the Giesche Coal Mine, and in the 1960s to the building of the former forester's lodge on Pod Lipami Square. In 1967, Kindergarten No. 61 was opened, in 1981 No. 59, and in 1985 No. 91.

Giszowiec was also home to Poland's first Day Care Center for Children with Special Needs, built by the Staszic Coal Mine between 1984 and 1986. The center was established on the initiative of pediatrician and pediatric neurologist Maria Trzcińska-Fajfrowska, who was also a resident of Giszowiec. In honor of its tragically deceased founder, it is now named the "Dr. Maria Trzcińska-Fajfrowska Rehabilitation, Education, and Care Center". It provides educational, medical, rehabilitation, and therapeutic care for children and adolescents.

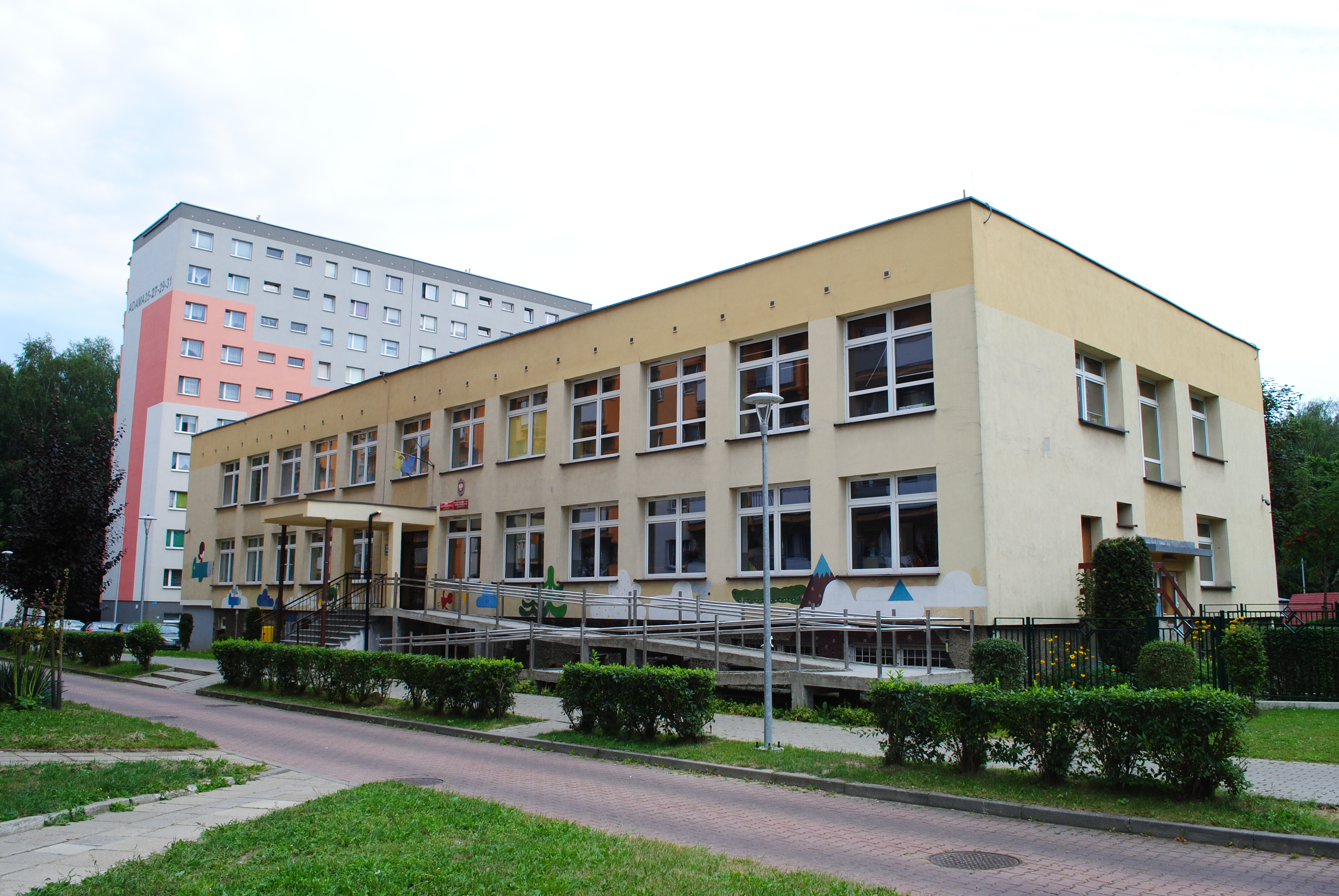
Kindergarten No. 91 (33 Adama Street)

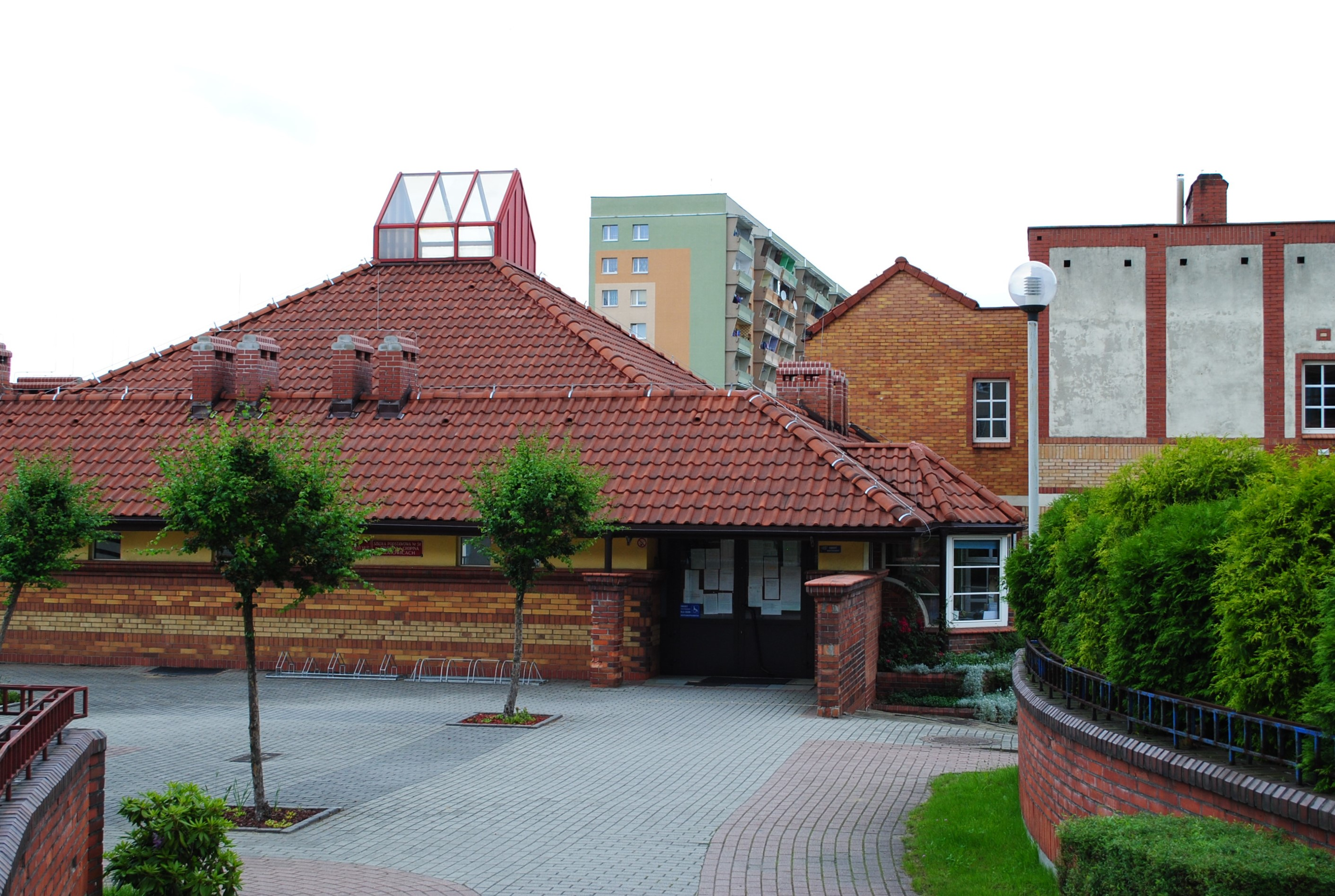
Frédéric Chopin Primary School No. 51 (7a Przyjazna Street)

As of mid-November 2020, the following educational and childcare facilities are in operation in Giszowiec:

- Nurseries:
  - Municipal Nursery. Branch of the Municipal Nursery (23 Wojciech Street).
- Kindergartens:
  - Municipal Kindergarten No. 59 (49 Wojciech Street),
  - Municipal Kindergarten No. 61 (School and Kindergarten Complex No. 13; 18 Karliczka Street),
  - Municipal Kindergarten No. 64 (2 Pod Lipami Square) – the first post-war kindergarten in Giszowiec. In 2018, it had 3 classes with 71 children.
- Elementary schools and school complexes:
  - Frédéric Chopin Primary School No. 51 with Integrated Departments (School and Kindergarten Complex No. 13; 7a Przyjazna Street) – a school that is part of a school complex which, in June 2019, was attended by a total of 41 preschool-aged children, 853 students in elementary school and 24 students in the 3rd grade of middle school. At that time, there were 42 classes and 2 preschool classes, 13 inclusive classes, and 4 sports classes, taught by 119 teachers,
  - Maria Konopnicka Primary School No. 54 (9 Wojciech Street),
  - Primary School for Girls Płomień (15 Karliczka Street).

== Public safety ==
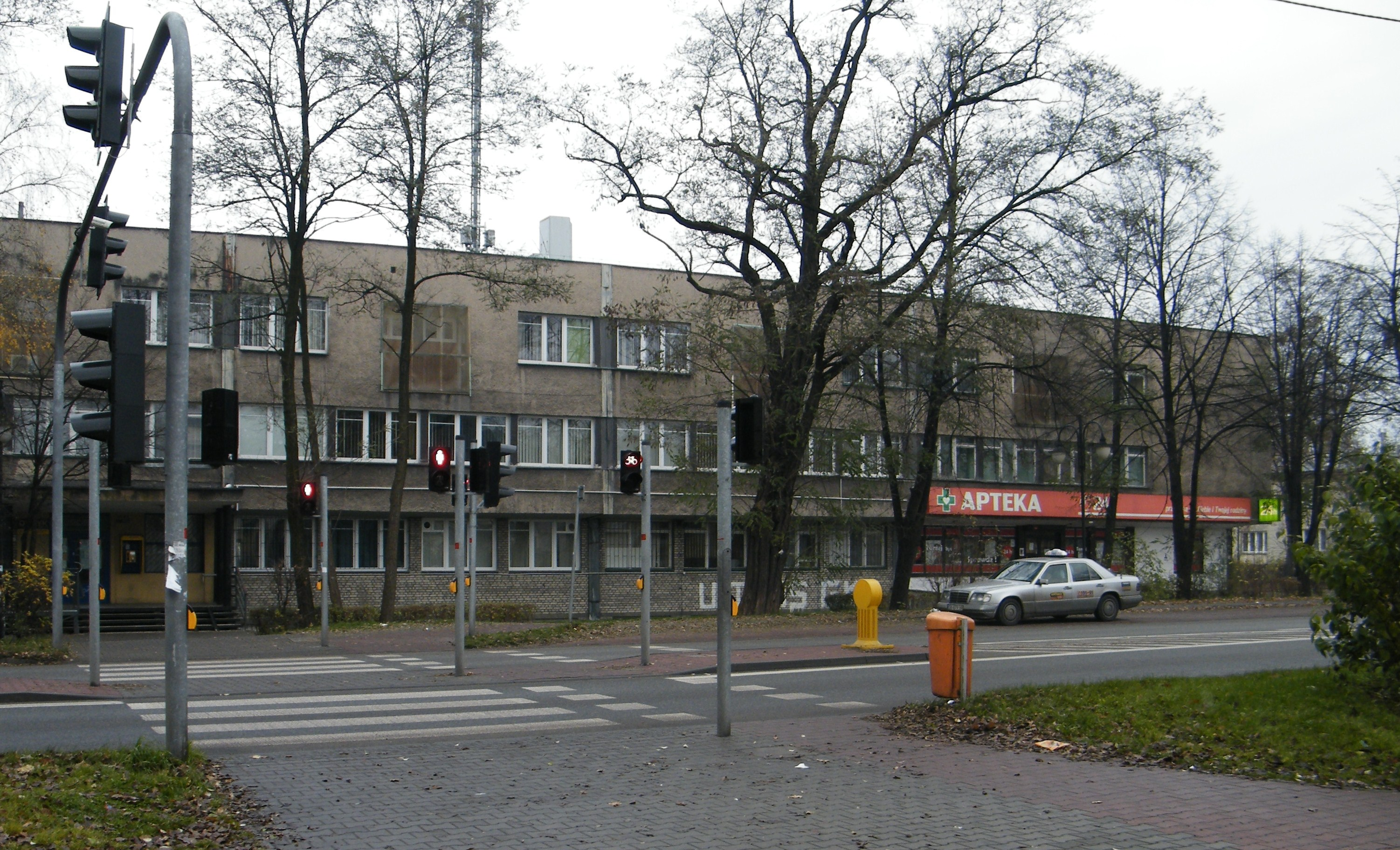
Bracka Staszic Clinic at 13 Mysłowicka Street (before renovation)

Basic public safety services had to be provided as early as the construction of Giszowiec. In August 1910, a contract was signed with a doctor from the Upper Silesian Brotherhood, who opened a medical practice in a building on Gościnna Street that no longer exists. In neighboring Nikiszowiec, a barracks for infectious patients was opened, which also treated residents of Giszowiec. A building housing a detention center and a fire station was erected on Radosna Street, and a fire tower was built nearby. Firefighting services were provided by the fire brigade from the Giesche Coal Mine, as well as by volunteers. After World War I, the doctor's office continued to operate, and nursing care was provided by nuns – the Sisters of St. Hedwig – who in 1928 were given a room in the former nursery on present-day Gościnna Street. From 1934, three nuns served in Giszowiec until 27 December 1939.

With the construction of new buildings after World War II, it became necessary to ensure better access to healthcare. A Medical and Preventive Care Center was established near the newly built Staszic Coal Mine to provide healthcare for the mine's workers. Initially, the facility's accommodations were modest. In 1972, a health center at 13 Mysłowicka Street was opened, which led to an improvement in the situation. The building consisted of two parts: the Staszic Coal Mine's in-house clinic and a clinic for the district's residents. The district clinic was later divided into a children's clinic and a general and specialist clinic. In the mid-1980s, the Staszic Coal Mine Inter-Company Clinic employed 6 general practitioners, 4 dentists, specialists (a surgeon, a radiologist, and an ENT specialist), as well as support staff.

As of June 2020, the following healthcare facilities are located in Giszowiec:

- Giszowiec Medical Center (6 Gościnna Street) – has a primary care clinic, 4 specialist clinics, and an ultrasound lab, staffed by 12 doctors,
- Delta-Med (9 Pod Lipami Square) – has a primary care clinic and 9 specialist clinics,
- Bracka Staszic Clinic (13 Mysłowicka Street) – has a primary care clinic, 8 specialist clinics, diagnostic labs, and a Day Medical Care Center.

In addition, the district is also home to the Giszowiec Veterinary Clinic at 65a Mysłowicka Street.

In terms of public safety, Giszowiec was the second safest district in Katowice in 2007, according to the crime rate, which stood at 1.13 crimes per 100 residents at the time (only Podlesie had a lower rate – 1.01; the average for Katowice as a whole was 3.08). Between 2004 and 2007, crime in Giszowiec decreased significantly – in 2004, the crime rate was 2.75 crimes per 100 people. In 2007, there were 19 traffic accidents in Giszowiec.

There are no police or fire stations in Giszowiec – the nearest ones are located in the Szopienice-Burowiec district. These are the Rescue and Firefighting Unit No. I of the State Fire Service (130 Krakowska Street), as well as Police Precinct V (7 Lwowska Street), whose jurisdiction includes, among other areas, Giszowiec.

== Culture ==
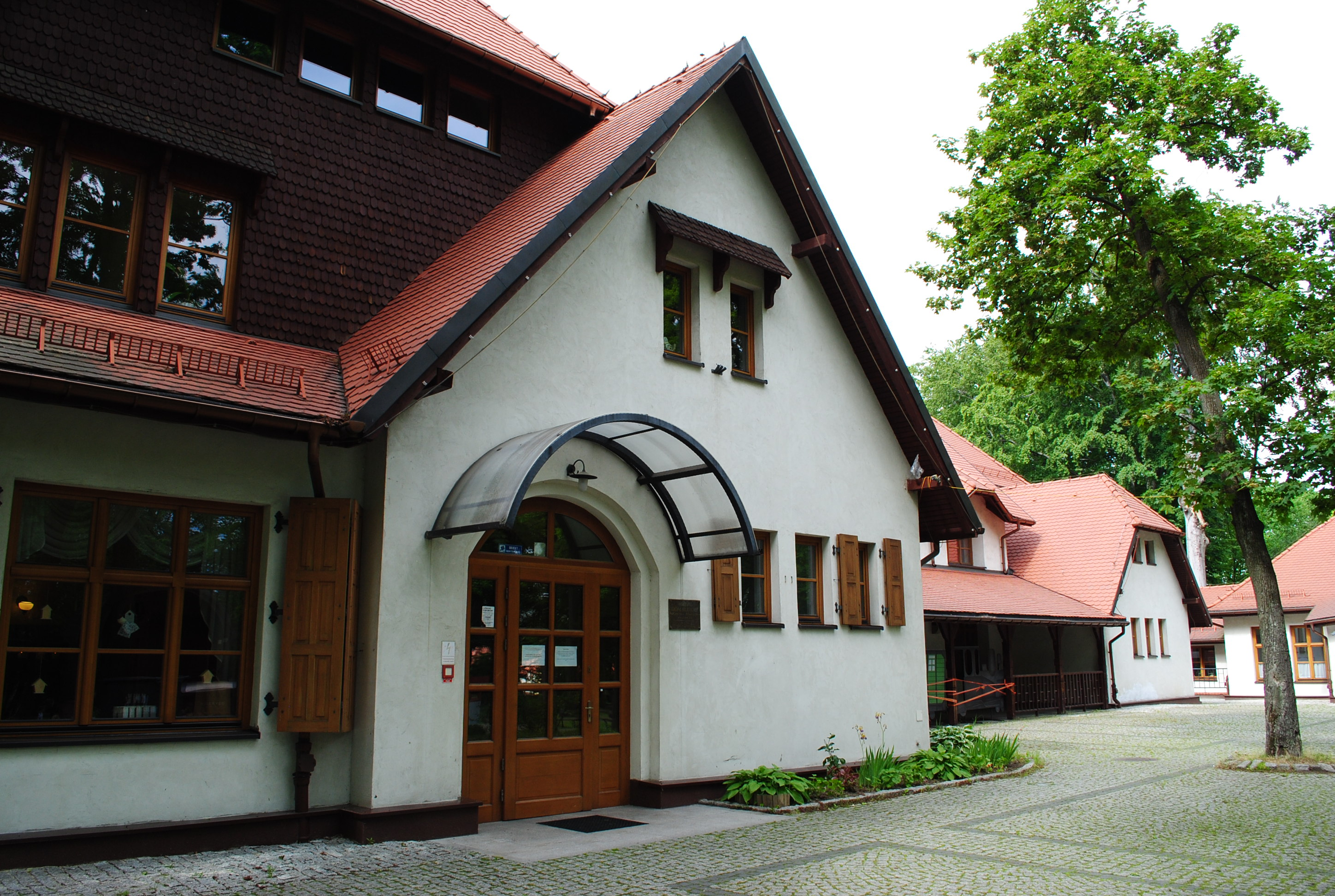
Branch No. 2 of the Szopienice-Giszowiec Municipal Cultural Center, located in the inn building at 1 Pod Lipami Square

Cultural activities in Giszowiec have been conducted since the estate's founding. A theater hall was set up in the inn building, and a band shell was built in the nearby park. The first cultural organizations were established as early as 1909. Initially, these were German organizations, such as the Arbeiter Gesangverein der Gieschegrube (Giesche Mine Workers' Singing Society) and the Gartenbau-Verein (Horticultural Society), founded in 1911. Even before World War I, Polish organizations were active in Giszowiec, such as the Polish People's Society, the Society of Polish Women, and the Polish Singing Society. From 1920, the Frédéric Chopin Mixed Choir operated in Giszowiec, which at that time had 85 members. One of the leading conductors at the time was Henryk Bara. In January 1930, a library was opened in Nikiszowiec for the employees of the Giesche Coal Mine, and at that time, the People's Libraries Society was also active in the building of the former canteen.

After World War II, the building of the former inn was converted into a community center offering classes in various fields. In 1949, the Muza cinema was established there, which was renovated in 1966. It remained in operation until 1978. In 1966, a company club began operating at the Staszic Coal Mine – initially in the former villa of the Giesche Coal Mine director on Pszczyńska Street. At that time, among the adult groups, there were two ensembles: the instrumental-vocal group Futuryści and a photography club, while for children there were two model-making clubs, an art club, and a dance-theater club. In 1984, a sports and entertainment hall was opened on Pszczyńska Street, and three years later, the building of the current "Gawlikówka" was renovated into a Senior Citizens’ Club. Three libraries also operated (in the 1960s, two branches in miners' housing and one in the mine's administrative building), and had 280 regular readers in 1966. In 1980, the library was relocated to the miners' housing complex, and in 1982 it came under the administration of the Staszic Coal Mine. In addition, one of the members of the Janów Group, Ewald Gawlik, lived and worked in Giszowiec. He painted, among other things, landscapes of Giszowiec, Nikiszowiec, and Janów. His works are on display at the Silesian Chamber (known as "Gawlikówka"). The second significant artist of the Janów Group was Erwin Sówka, born in 1936 in Giszowiec.

In 1971, the Staszic Coal Mine Symphony Orchestra was founded at the Staszic Coal Mine on the initiative of Anzelm Siwiec and Bolesław Polok. It began its activities one year after its founding. The orchestra performed on the occasion of anniversaries and national holidays, as well as mine celebrations. It also participated in mining orchestra festivals.

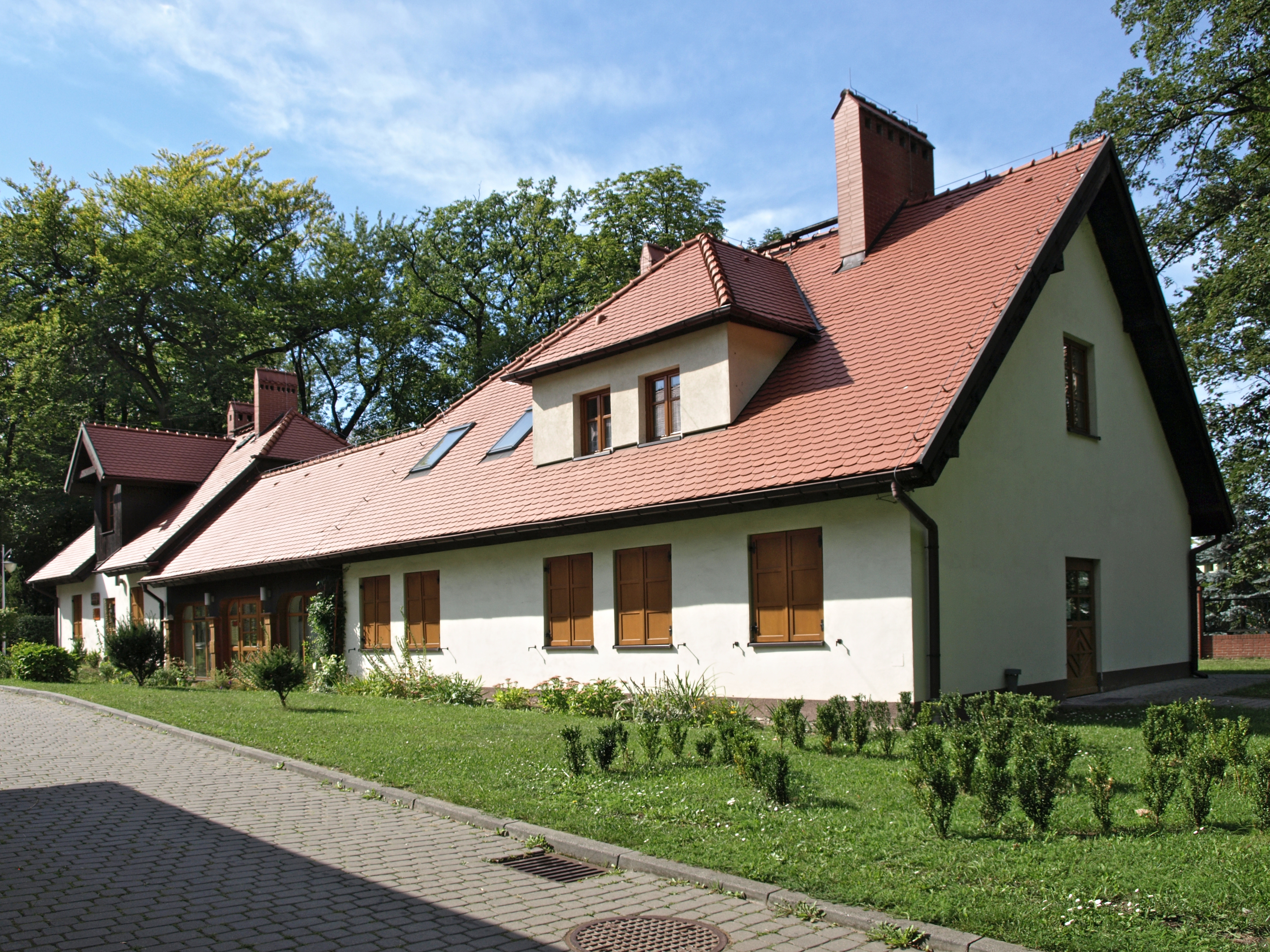
Silesian Chamber at 3–3a Pod Lipami Square (the so-called "Gawlikówka")

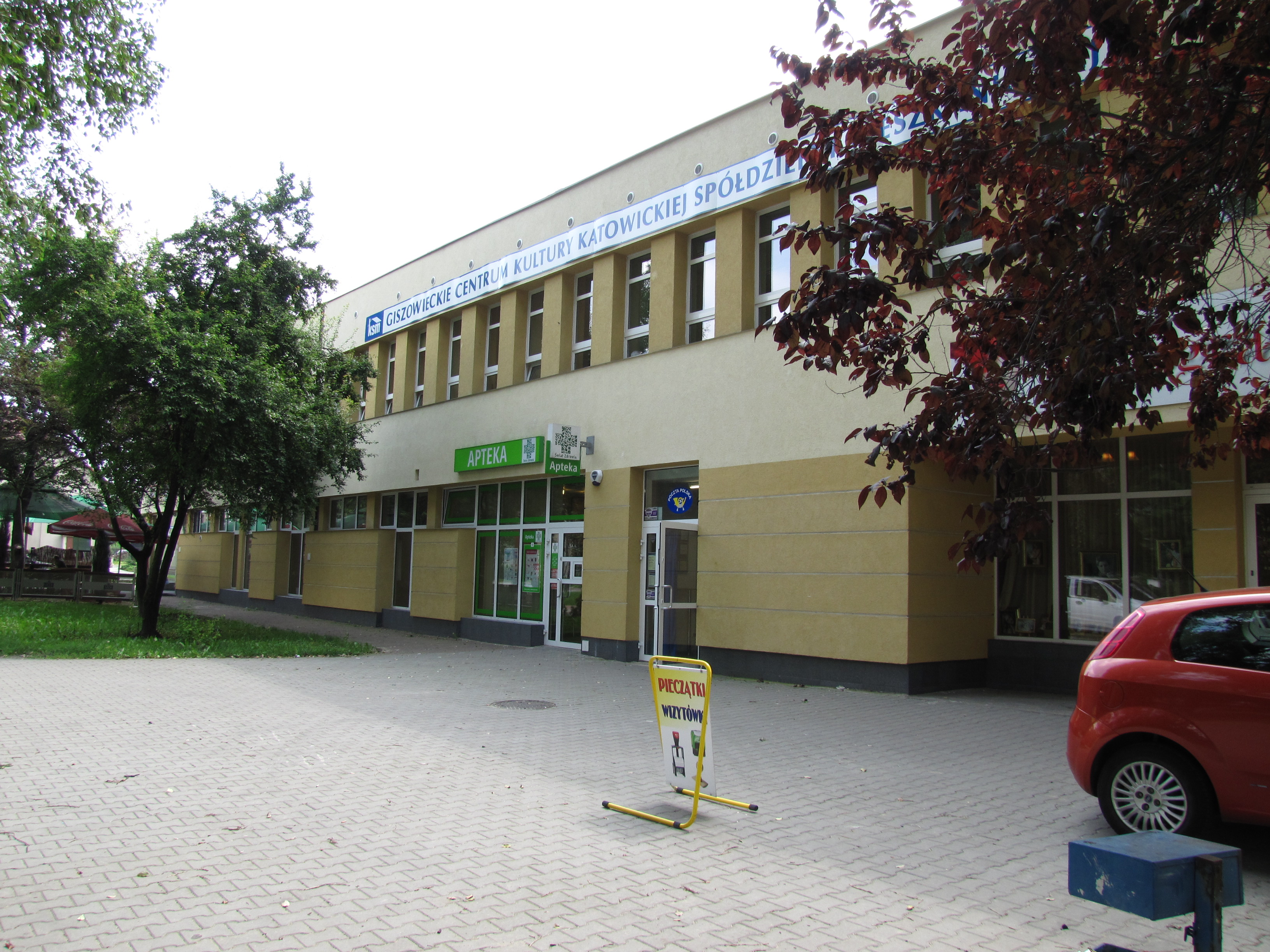
Giszowiec Cultural Center at 28/4 Mysłowicka Street

The following cultural institutions are located in Giszowiec:

- The Szopienice-Giszowiec Municipal Community Center, Branch No. 2 – a community center housed in the inn building at 1 Pod Lipami Square and the former stable (now the Silesian Chamber) at 3–3a Pod Lipami Square. The Community Center offers classes for children and adults on various topics, including vocal lessons, instrument lessons, art classes, science workshops for children, a Silesian language school, gymnastics and aerobics, Zumba, a boules and skat club, and senior clubs. The Milian Orkiestra big band also holds its rehearsals there; the group traces its origins back to 1974 as the Polish Radio and Television Entertainment Orchestra in Katowice. It was founded by jazz musician Jerzy Milian. The Silesian Chamber, which has been active in the cultural sphere since 1987, is also affiliated with the Cultural Center. In 2006, the building was renovated, and a museum presenting a traditional Upper Silesian parlor was established there. It also houses a gallery of paintings by Ewald Gawlik.
- Giszowiec Cultural Center – a community center located at 28/4 Mysłowicka Street, managed by the Katowice Housing Cooperative. The center offers activities for children and adults, including music lessons, art and literature classes, physical activities, social gatherings, and vocal workshops.

=== In literature ===
Giszowiec and Nikiszowiec are described in the book Czarny ogród (Black Garden) by Małgorzata Szejnert, winner of the first edition of the Cogito Public Media Award in the field of fiction. The story was also nominated for the 2008 Nike Award and the 2008 Gdynia Literary Award. It is a well-documented, journalistic account of the fates of selected families from these localities. It includes examples of authentic documents, photographs, and a wealth of previously unpublished information about the lives of figures distinguished in the neighborhood, including: Józef Wieczorek, Alfred Gansiniec, Ewald Gawlik, Kazimierz Kutz, Erwin Sówka, Maria Trzcińska-Fajfrowska, and Rozalia Kajzer-Piesiur.

=== In film ===
Giszowiec had already been featured on film between 1925 and 1926. At that time, the series Wielki przemysł na Górnym Śląsku (Great Industry in Upper Silesia), directed by Stefan Pierzchalski, included footage of the workers' colony in Giszowiec. Paciorki jednego różańca (Beads of a Single Rosary) by Kazimierz Kutz included authentic documentary footage of the demolition of the old mining settlement in Giszowiec. The film's plot also alludes to this event, especially in the storyline involving the conflict between Habryka, a distinguished insurgent and miner, and mine director Klimczuk. Habryka refuses to leave the house where he lives and move into an apartment building. The film helped halt the demolition, thereby saving part of the garden city.

== Religion ==
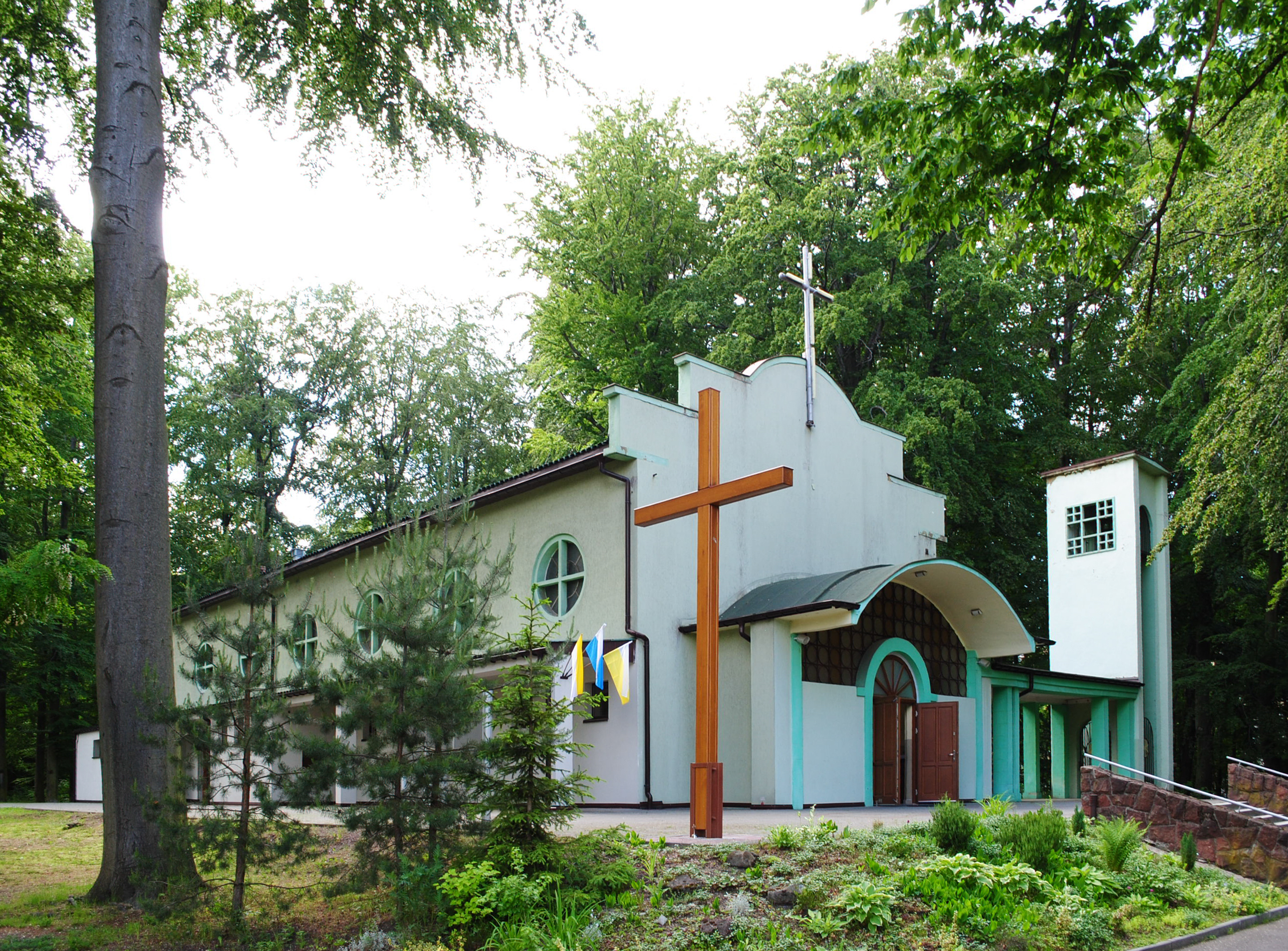
Church of the Parish of St. Stanislaus Kostka, consecrated on 17 March 1948

In Giszowiec, the Roman Catholic Church is the dominant religious community, but since the estate's founding, Protestants have lived there alongside Catholics. Initially, Catholics from the estate belonged to the parish in Mysłowice, then to the Parish of St. Anne in Janów, while Protestants had their house of prayer in the building of the Protestant school on Działkowa Street. In 1947, the first Roman Catholic parish in Giszowiec, dedicated to St. Stanislaus Kostka, was established. Its origins are linked to the activities of the administrator of the Parish of St. Anne, Father Alfons Tomaszewski, who, in a letter dated 24 September 1945 to the Katowice Coal Industry Union, presented three proposals for organizing an independent pastoral ministry in Giszowiec: converting the former Evangelical school into a chapel, designating the former bachelor's house for religious worship, or the gmina purchasing or leasing a plot of land for the construction of a new church. The proposals were initially rejected, but ultimately, on 6 June 1946, an agreement was signed under which the parish took over an undeveloped plot on Górniczego Stanu Street. On 12 May of that same year, a church construction committee was formed, but the new authorities of Gmina Janów were opposed to the project. The consecration of the Church of St. Stanislaus Kostka took place on the second day of Pentecost on 17 May 1948.

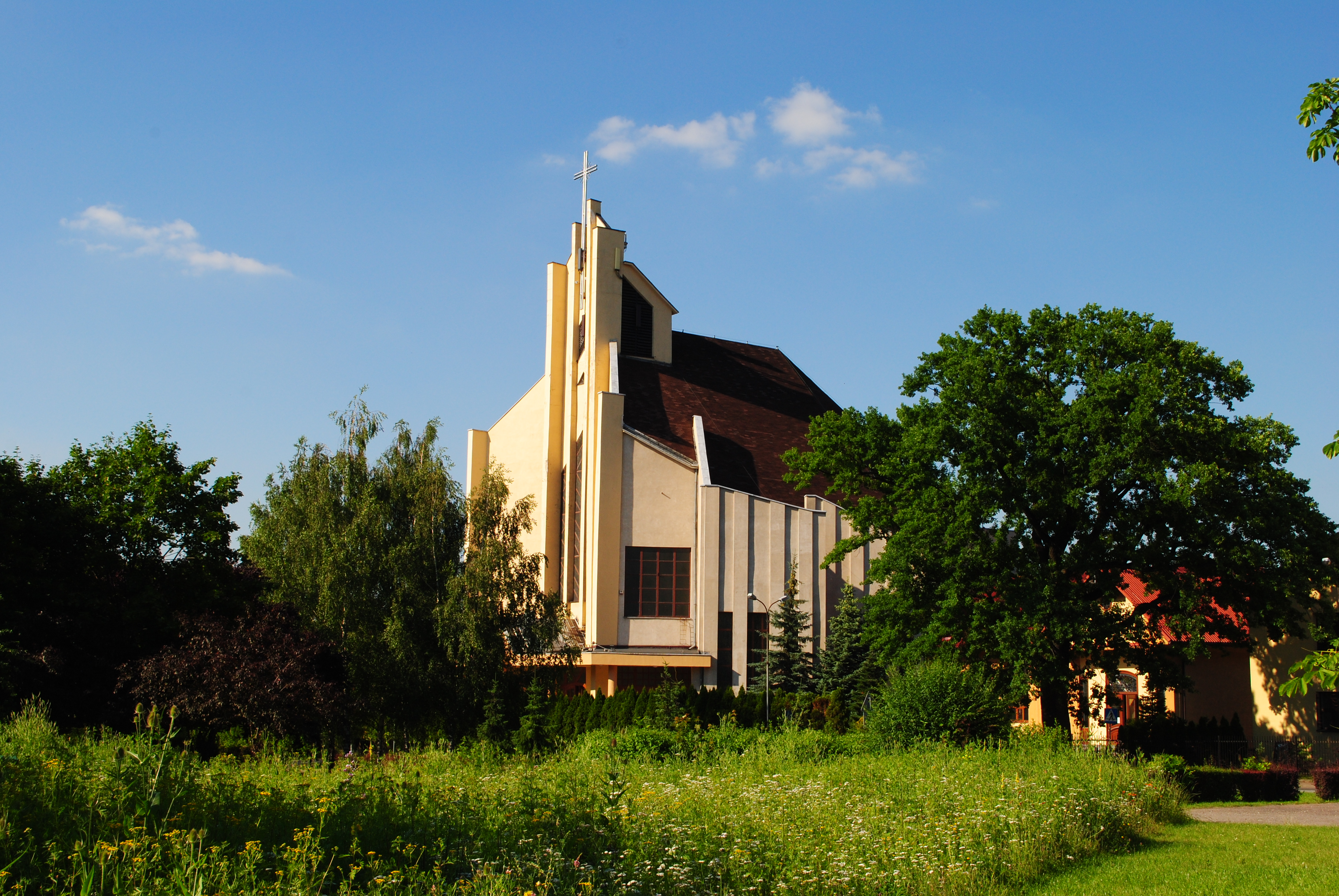
Church of the Parish of St. Barbara, consecrated in 1994

The Parish of St. Stanislaus Kostka owns the only cemetery in Giszowiec, located on Górniczego Stanu Street, covering an area of 0.73 hectares. Efforts to establish it had been underway since 14 July 1948, as documented in a letter to the County Office. Ultimately, the parish acquired the land for the cemetery on 26 October 1949, when a handover protocol was signed with representatives of the Imielin Forest District. The official decision permitting burials at the cemetery was obtained on 16 November 1950.

Due to the expansion of the estate and the ever-increasing number of residents, the Church of St. Stanislaus Kostka became too small, so it was decided to build a new one. On 20 June 1983, during his visit to Katowice, Pope John Paul II consecrated the cornerstone for the construction of the new Church of St. Barbara. Father Izydor Harazin served as the church's builder and later became its parson, while Zygmunt Fagas was responsible for the design. The new Parish of St. Barbara was established on 19 August 1984, and the first work on the foundations of the new church began in July 1985. The solemn consecration of the church took place on 23 October 1994.

== Sport and recreation ==
=== Sport ===
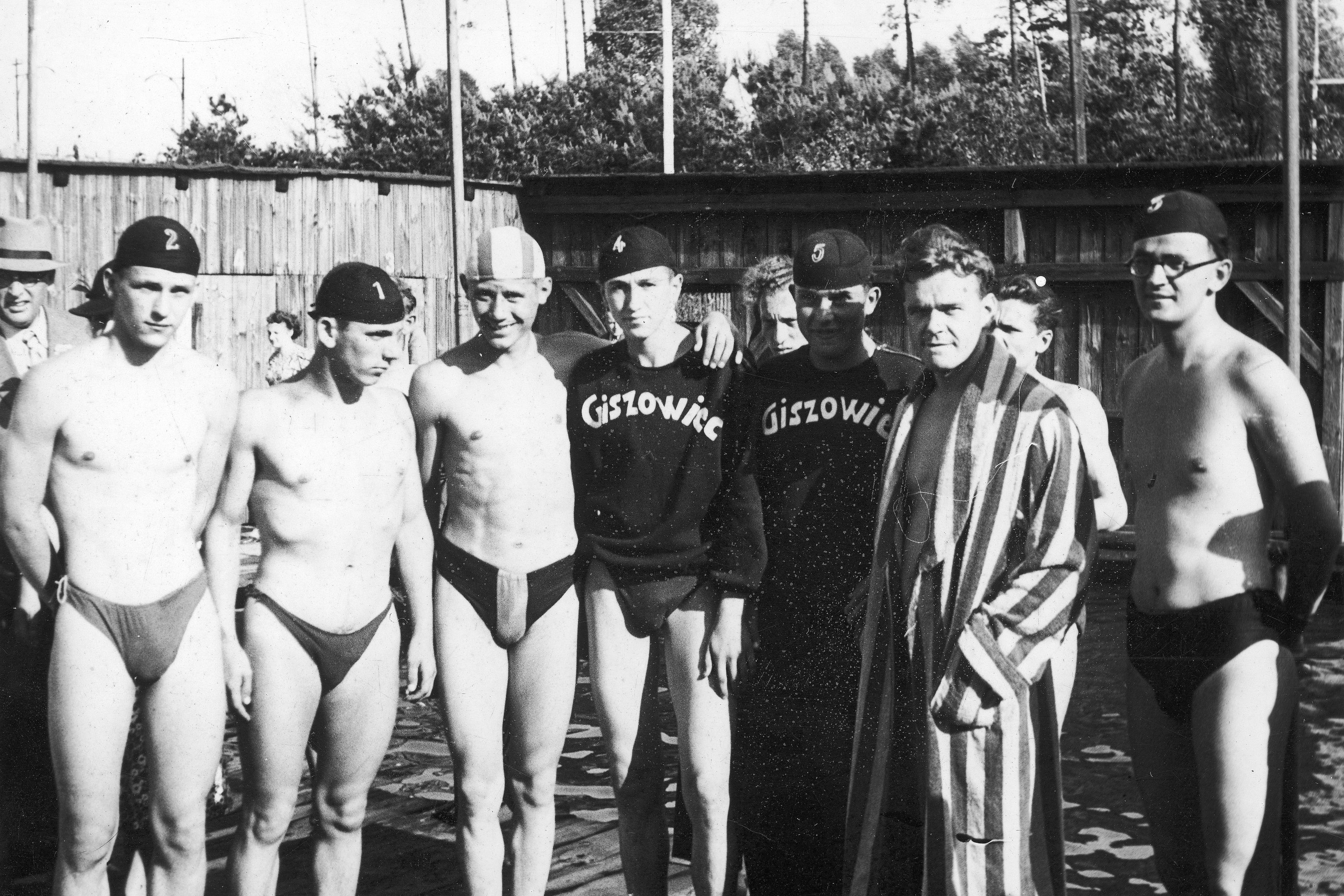
Swimmers of the Giszowiec-Nikiszowiec 23 Swimming Society during the Polish Water Polo Championships held in August 1938

The oldest sports club in Giszowiec was the now-defunct Giszowiec-Nikiszowiec 23 Swimming Society, founded on the initiative of Jan Skupina. The Małgorzata Pond served as the base for this swimming club. The club gained its greatest popularity thanks to its swimmer Rozalia Kajzer-Piesiur. She was the first Olympian from Giszowiec and a participant in the Summer Olympics in 1928. In addition, there was a bowling alley on the grounds of Giszowiec near the inn, and a golf course and tennis courts near the director's villa.

In April 1945, the Giszowiec-Nikiszowiec 23 Swimming Society was taken over by the reactivated RKS Siła Giszowiec club. Its first general meeting was held on 22 April 1945. At that time, ice hockey, soccer, and volleyball sections were established. That same year, Cracovia became the first post-war Polish hockey champion, and Siła Giszowiec took third place. Alfred Gansiniec, a player for Siła Giszowiec, competed in the Winter Olympics in St. Moritz and in the 1952 Winter Olympics in Oslo. In 1948, the club oversaw the modernization of the ice rink, which was located in present-day Osiedle Adama. A year later, the club merged with three others to form Górnik Janów, which later became Naprzód Janów. Giszowiec was the birthplace of several athletes, including Jan Junger – a mountaineer and Andean climber who, in the 1960s and 1970s, established many new climbing routes in the Andes, Alps, and Tatra Mountains. In December 1970, the Miners' Sailing Club was founded, initially with 45 members. The club established a sailing base in Ogonki in present-day Warmian-Masurian Voivodeship. Every year since 1965, the Staszic Coal Mine organized Spartakiads in various disciplines, both summer and winter. In 1966, 617 people participated in the Spartakiad across various disciplines, while in 1983 there were nearly 900. During this event, soccer matches attracted the most interest.

From 1999 to 2003, the Giszowiec Tennis Association operated on the courts located on Pszczyńska Street. The sailing club continued its activities as the Zwrot Sailing Association, which moved from its center in Ogonki to Piękna Góra near Giżycko. The Tytan 92 Katowice Wrestling Sports Club, founded in 1992, operates in Giszowiec. Its greatest success in its history was the Polish cadet team championship, won in 1997 in Kostrzyn. The Amicus-Giszowiec Sports and Recreation Club, operating within the estate, runs two sections: skat, and, since 2012, pétanque.

=== Barbara-Janina Resort ===
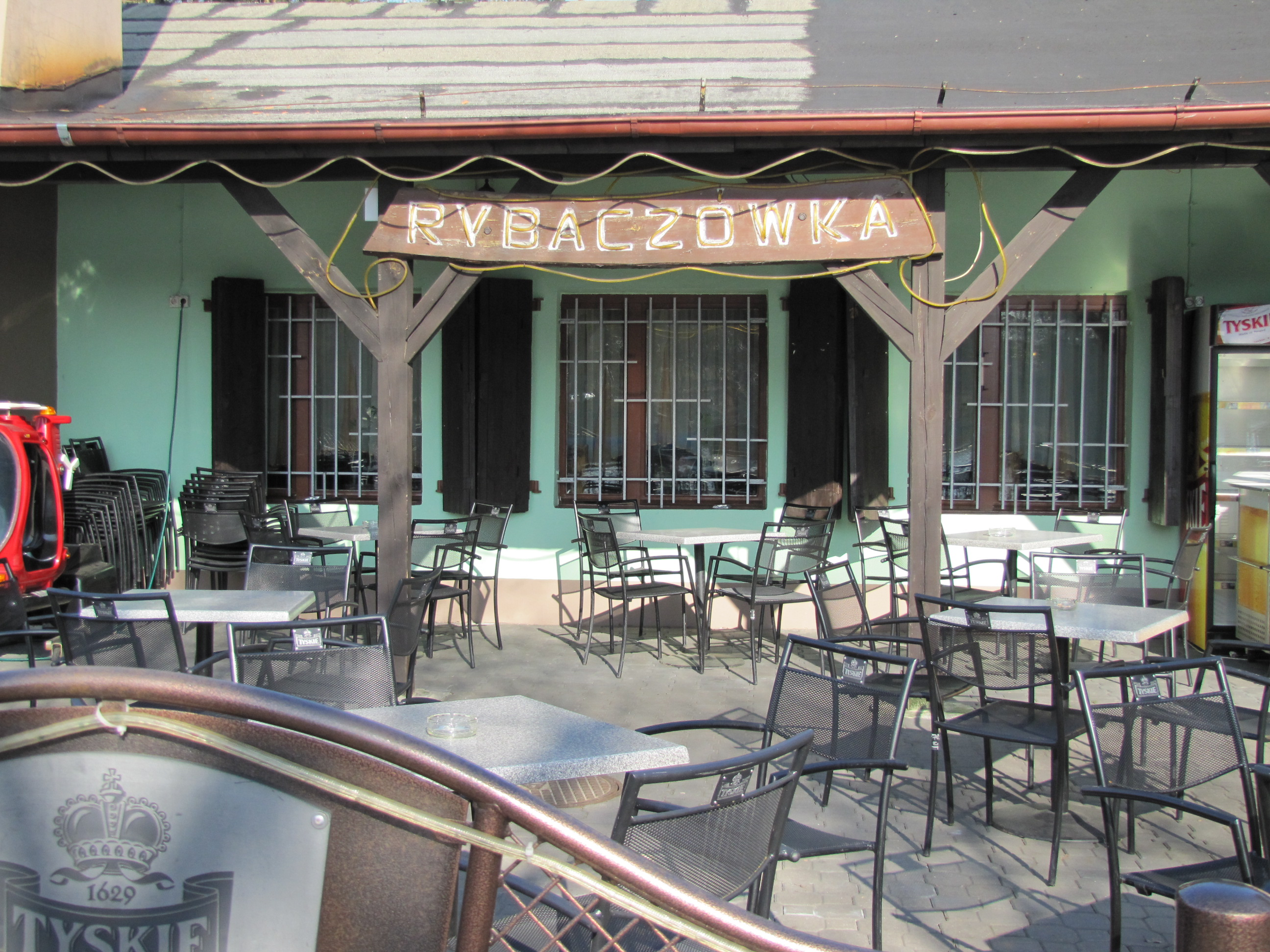
Rybaczówka by Janina Pond

The history of the Barbara-Janina forest resort in Giszowiec began in 1977, when the Staszic Coal Mine began construction of a recreational resort. The name Barbara-Janina comes from the names of two nearby ponds around which the resort was built. A recreational facility was created there for employees of the Staszic Coal Mine and residents of Giszowiec. The resort's location within the forest and near the ponds provided ideal conditions for sports. It also encouraged fishing, walking, and cycling within the forest park. The entire resort, covering approximately 50 hectares, was divided into several sections: a swimming area, a walking and recreation area, and sports fields. A fitness trail was also marked out in the forest. In 1971, a group of anglers organized a fishing club there.

In 1977, the club took over and developed the Górnik Pond and began construction of the Rybaczówka lodge on the Janina Pond. The Górnik and Janina ponds were stocked with fish on several occasions. In 1981, the municipal club was transformed into an independent branch of the Polish Angling Association. Currently, the former Rybaczówka, which served as the anglers' headquarters, houses a beer bar. One of the Rybaczówka buildings burned down in March 2020.

== Tourism ==
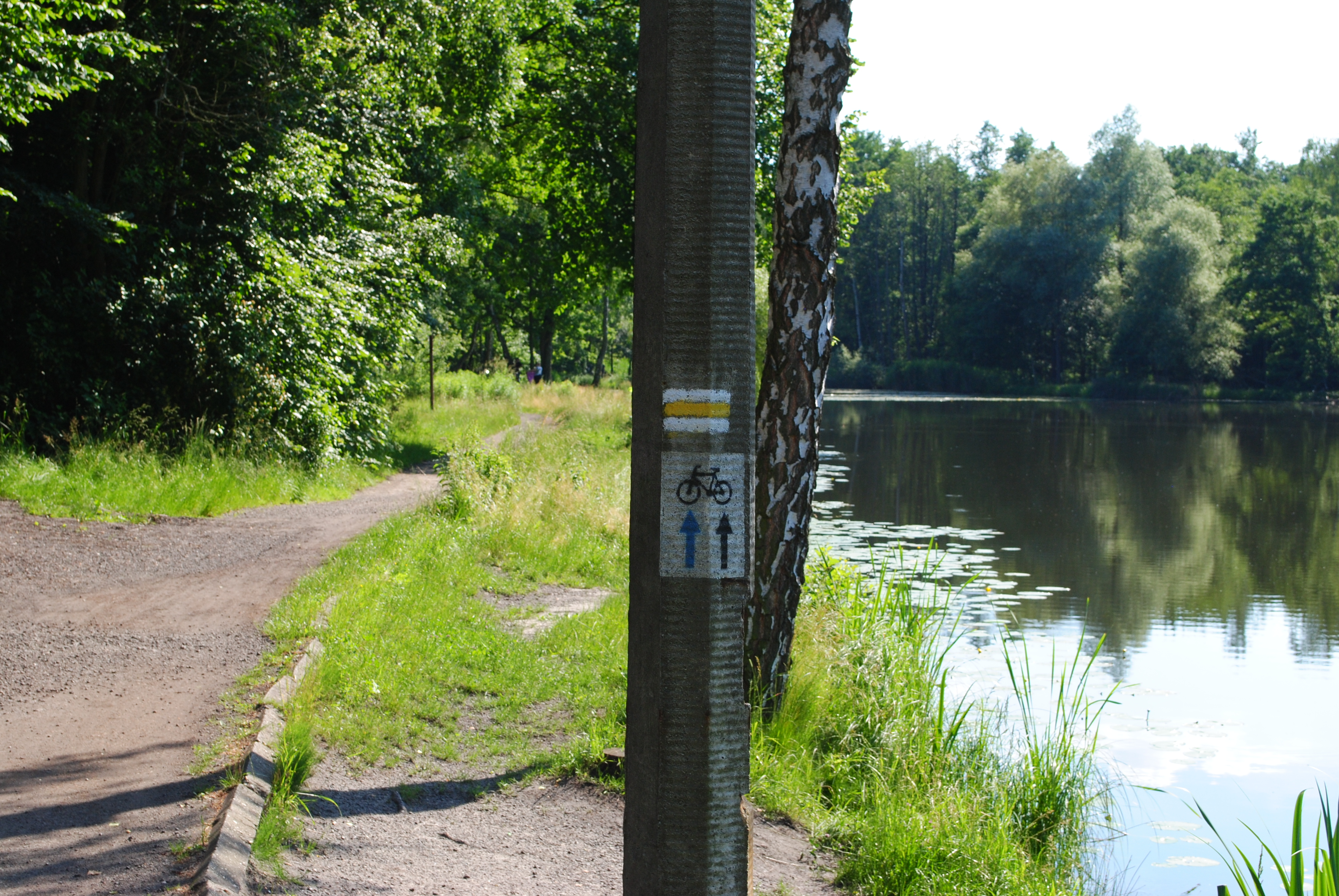
Fragment of the Upper Silesian Mining History Route by Janina Pond

Giszowiec, thanks to its historic architecture (a workers' colony unique in Europe), is one of Katowice’s major tourist attractions. The estate is located on the Silesian Industrial Monuments Route, established in 2006. In Giszowiec itself, tourist attractions include, among others, the inn building, which serves as one of the branches of the Szopienice-Giszowiec Municipal Cultural Center, and the Silesian Chamber, which houses a gallery of paintings by Ewald Gawlik. The following hiking trails pass through Giszowiec:

- Silesian Industrial Monuments Route: Częstochowa – Giszowiec – Żywiec,
- 25th Anniversary of Polish Tourist and Sightseeing Society Trail: Giszowiec – Starganiec,
- Dolinka Murckowska Trail: Giszowiec – Stara Wesoła – Dolinka Murckowska,
- Upper Silesian Mining History Route: Łubianki – Giszowiec – Ławki – Rybnik,
- Hołdunów Trail: Giszowiec – Ławki – Jeleń,
- Marian Kantor-Mirski Trail: Giszowiec – Mysłowice.

=== Worth seeing ===
- Colony Gieschewald with received allocation of road and work houses (1907–1910)
- Water tower from the time of origin of the colony
- Forest areas in the environment

== Bibliography ==
- Barciak, Antoni; Chojecka, Ewa; Fertacz, Sylwester (2012). Katowice. Środowisko, dzieje, kultura, język i społeczeństwo [Katowice. Environment, History, Culture, Language and Society] (in Polish). Vol. 1–2. Katowice: Museum of History of Katowice. ISBN 978-83-87727-24-6.
- Frużyński, Adam; Grzegorek, Grzegorz; Rygus, Piotr (2017). Kopalnie i huty Katowic [Mines and Steelworks of Katowice] (in Polish). Katowice: Prasa i Książka. ISBN 978-83-63780-23-4.
- Fajer, Maria (2008). "Gleby na obszarze Górnośląskiego Związku Metropolitalnego" [Soils in the Area of the Upper Silesian Metropolitan Union]. Górnośląski Związek Metropolitalny. Zarys geograficzny [Upper Silesian Metropolitan Union. Geographical Outline] (in Polish). Sosnowiec: Polish Geographical Society. ISBN 978-83-61695-00-4.
- Jaros, Jerzy (1984). Słownik historyczny kopalń węgla na ziemiach polskich [Historical Dictionary of Coal Mines in Polish Lands] (in Polish). Katowice: Silesian Scientific Institute. ISBN 83-00-00648-6.
- Jaros, Jerzy; Sekuła, Henryk (1984). Kopalnia „Staszic” 1964-1984 [Staszic Coal Mine 1964-1984] (in Polish). Katowice: Silesian Scientific Institute. ISBN 83-7008-056-1.
- Matuszek, Piotr (2008). "„Katowickie" osiedle potomków Gieshego" [The "Katowice" Housing Estate of Giesche's Descendants]. In Matuszek, P.; Tofilska, A.; Złoty, A. (eds.). Nikiszowiec, Giszowiec i inne osiedla Katowic [Nikiszowiec, Giszowiec and Other Housing Estates of Katowice] (in Polish). State Archive in Katowice. ISBN 978-83-7593-005-4.
- Szaraniec, Lech (1996). Osady i osiedla Katowic [Settlements and Housing Estates of Katowice] (in Polish). Katowice: Artur. ISBN 83-905115-0-9.
- Szejnert, Małgorzata (2007). Czarny ogród [Black Garden] (in Polish) (1st ed.). Kraków: Znak. ISBN 978-83-240-0896-4.
- Tofilska, Joanna (2007). Katowice Nikiszowiec: miejsce, ludzie, historia [Katowice Nikiszowiec: Place, People, History] (in Polish). Katowice: Muzeum Historii Katowic. ISBN 978-83-87727-68-0.
- Tofilska, Joanna (2016). Giszowiec. Monografia historyczna [Giszowiec. Historical Monograph] (in Polish). Katowice: Museum of History of Katowice. ISBN 978-83-64356-19-3.
- Tokarska-Guzik, Barbara; Rostański, Adam; Kupka, Roman (2002). Katowice. Przyroda miasta [Katowice. Nature of the City] (in Polish). Katowice: Kubajak. ISBN 83-87971-49-9.
- Zając-Jendryczka, Agnieszka (2007). Społeczność Giszowca – dzielnicy Katowic [Community of Giszowiec – District of Katowice] (in Polish). Katowice: Śląsk. ISBN 978-83-7164-533-4.
- Zemła, Marek, ed. (25 April 2012). Studium uwarunkowań i kierunków zagospodarowania przestrzennego miasta Katowice – II edycja. Część 1. Uwarunkowania zagospodarowania przestrzennego [Study of the Conditions and Directions of Spatial Development of the City of Katowice – Second Edition. Part One. Conditions of Spatial Development] (PDF) (in Polish). Katowice: Biuro Rozwoju Regionu.

== Literature ==
- H.von Reuffurth, Gieschewald ein neues oberschlesisches Bergarbeiterdorf der Bergwerksgesellschaft, Kattowitz 1910
- Leszek Jabłołski, Maria Kaźmierczak: Na trasie Ekspresu Giszowiec Nikiszowiec Szopienice. Przewodnik po dzielnicach Katowic. CRUX, Katowice o.J., ISBN 83-918152-1-8 (leaders by the quarters Giszowiec, Nikiszowiec and Szopienice with English summary)
