= Dąbrówka Mała =

- Katowice District
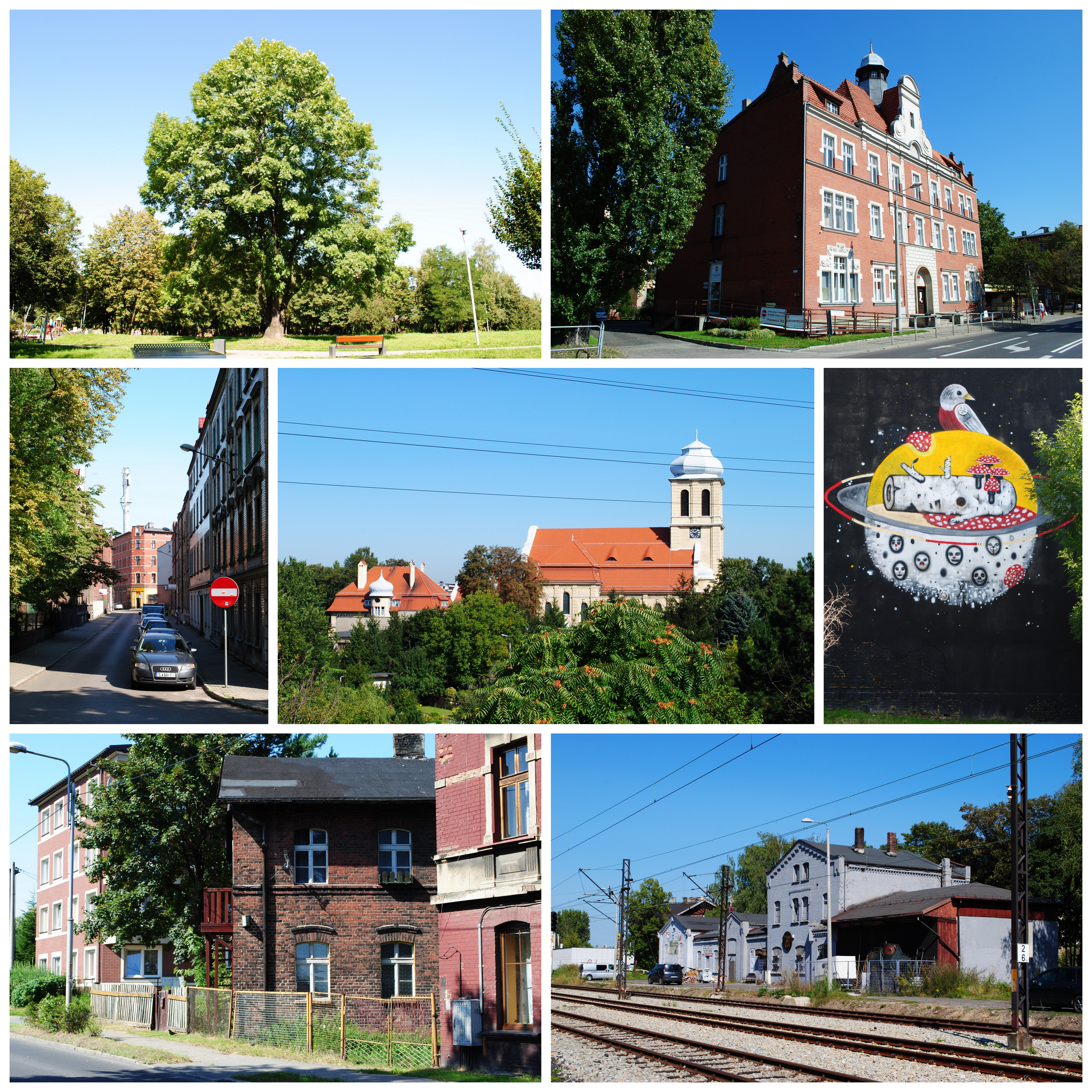
- Zielony Zakątek Park, the former town hall of Gmina Dąbrówka Mała, Stacyjna Street, Church of St. Anthony of Padua, a mural on the building at 85 Henri Le Rond Street, familok at 50 H. Le Rond Street, and the former building at the Katowice Dąbrówka Mała railway station (currently the headquarters of the Gry i Ludzie Theater)

- Coat of arms

- Location of Dąbrówka Mała within Katowice
- Coordinates: 50°16′37″N 19°04′51″E
- Country: Poland
- Voivodeship: Silesian
- County/City: Katowice
- Established: 1 January 1992

Area
  - Total: 3.68 km^{2} (1.42 sq mi)
- Elevation: 255–275 m (837–902 ft)

Population (2019)
  - Total: 4,759
  - Density: 1,290/km^{2} (3,350/sq mi)
- Time zone: UTC+1 (CET)
  - Summer (DST): UTC+2 (CEST)
- Area code: (+48) 032
- Vehicle registration: SK
- Primary airport: Katowice Airport

Dąbrówka Mała (German: Klein-Dombrowka, Eichenau) is a part and a district of Katowice, located in the northeastern part of the city, by the Brynica river. In addition to Dąbrówka Mała itself, the district consists of most of its former hamlets and colonies: Stary Czekaj, Nowy Czekaj, Georg, Norma, Pniaki, and Pod Młynem, as well as Osiedle Konstantego Michalskiego. Outside the district's borders, in Szopienice-Burowiec, is the former colony of Dąbrówka Mała – Burowiec.

The origins of Dąbrówka Mała date back to the 15th century, when it belonged to the Duchy of Siewierz. The settlement underwent rapid development in the second half of the 19th century with the establishment of mining operations and steel mills in the area, which led to a quick increase in the population. During the German occupation (World War II), on 3–4 April 1940, the German police committed a massacre of 40 Poles from Katowice in Dąbrówka Mała. The occupiers also operated a Polenlager forced labour camp for Poles in Dąbrówka Mała.

From 1945, the village formed a separate gmina, and in 1951, it became part of the town of Szopienice. Along with Szopienice, it was incorporated into Katowice on 31 December 1959. After 1989, Dąbrówka Mała underwent economic changes related to the decline of heavy industry, as well as the development of new economic sectors.

The buildings in Dąbrówka Mała consist mainly of tenements and familoks, built near existing mines and steel mills to house workers and their families. Next to them, housing estates made of so-called large-panel-system building were constructed (including Osiedle Konstantego Michalskiego and the apartment blocks on Wiertnicza Street) in the 1960s and 1970s. Dąbrówka Mała is surrounded by a major transportation route – expressway S86 – and the Brynica river. It has an area of 3.68 km^{2} and in 2019 had 4,759 inhabitants.

== Geography ==
=== Location ===
Administratively, Dąbrówka Mała is located in the Silesian Voivodeship and is one of the auxiliary units of the city of Katowice (no. 14), situated in the northeastern part of the city, approximately 5 km from the center.

It borders the neighboring districts of Katowice: Bogucice to the west, and Zawodzie and Szopienice-Burowiec to the south, as well as the nearby cities: Sosnowiec (Milowice district) to the east, and Czeladź (Piaski district) and Siemianowice Śląskie (area of the former Katowice Power Station; Centrum district) to the north. The district's boundaries are:

- to the north and east – the border of Katowice with the cities of Siemianowice Śląskie, Czeladź, and Sosnowiec (partly along the Brynica river);
- to the south – Walenty Roździeński Avenue to the intersection with Szwedzka Street;
- to the west – Szwedzka, Techników, Wiertnicza streets, and partially Budowlana Street. Further on, the border of Dąbrówka Mała forms the border of Katowice with Siemianowice Śląskie.

According to Jerzy Kondracki's physio-geographical regionalization, Dąbrówka Mała is located in the Katowice Upland mesoregion, which forms the southern part of the Silesian Upland macroregion. The Silesian Upland itself is a part of the Silesian-Kraków Upland subprovince. Historically, it forms part of eastern Upper Silesia.

=== Geology ===
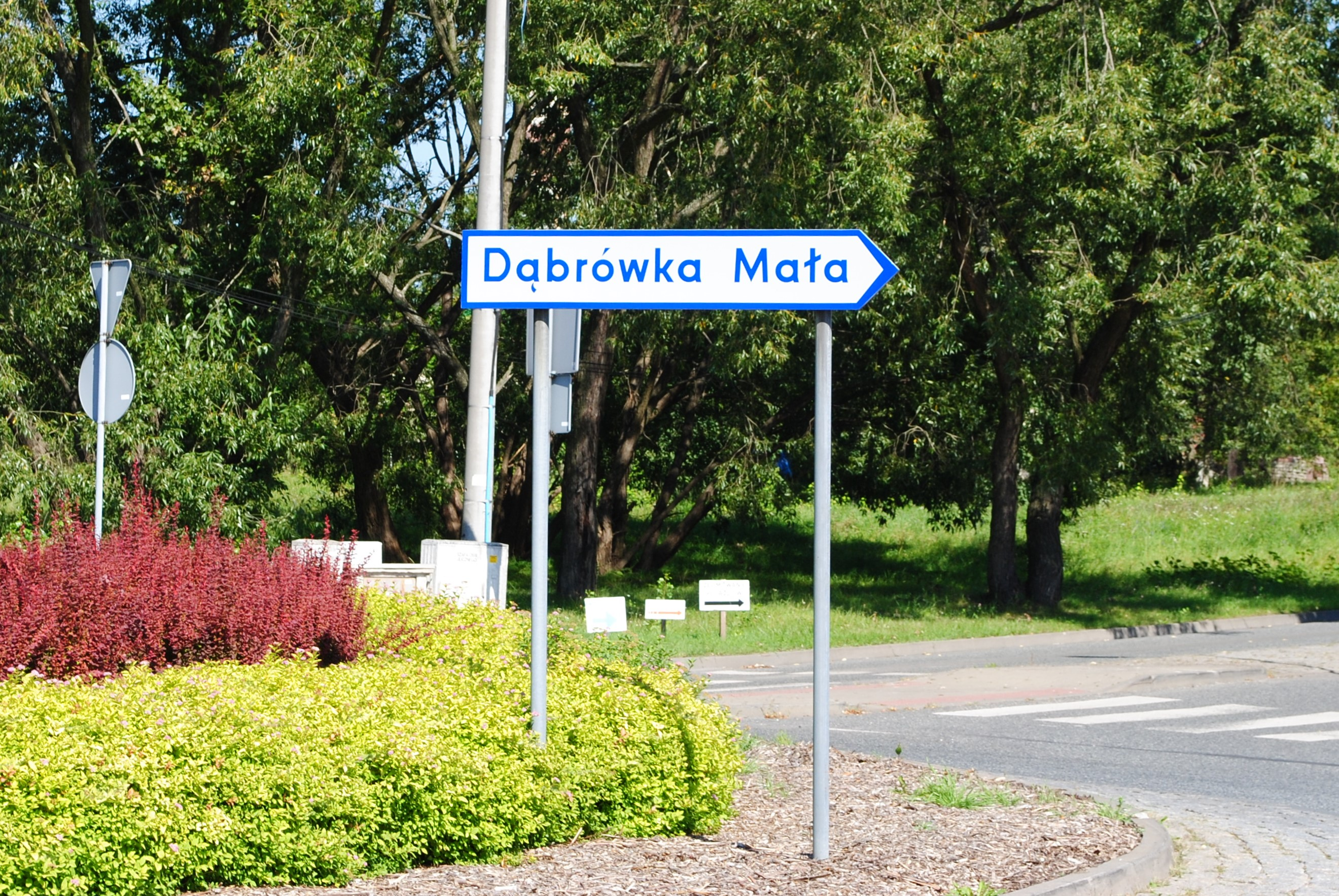
Signpost for Dąbrówka Mała at the Jerzy Pawlik Roundabout on the border between Bogucice and Dąbrówka Mała

In terms of its geological structure, Dąbrówka Mała is located within the Upper Silesian Sinkhole in an area with horst structures. At the turn of the Devonian and Carboniferous periods, the Paleozoic bedrock of the Silesian Upland was disturbed by the formation of a sinkhole, which during the Carboniferous was filled with conglomerates, sandstones, and shales containing bituminous coal deposits. In Dąbrówka Mała, these formations have been entirely covered by layers dating from the Quaternary (Pleistocene and Holocene).

During the Pleistocene, the area of Dąbrówka Mała was likely covered by an ice sheet on two occasions: during the Mindel glaciation and the Riss glaciation. The latter left behind tills, which are found mainly in the western part of Katowice, while in the eastern part, including the area of Dąbrówka Mała, they were partially denudated during the periglacial period, creating extensive areas of diluvial clays mixed with sands and fluvioglacial gravels. Sandy and silty eluvium in Dąbrówka Mała is common in the central part of the district (the urbanized center and the western part), while the remaining area (mainly the northern part) consists of glacial and fluvioglacial sands and gravels.

During the Holocene, Pleistocene deposits were eroded, especially in river valleys, which created low terraces in several stages as a result of the cutting through of the aggradation deposits. Holocene sediments extend along the Śmiłowski Trench valley, in the area of Pod Młynem Street, as well as in a line running parallel to the north of Walenty Roździeński Avenue.

=== Terrain ===
Dąbrówka Mała is located in the Silesian Upland, within the Katowice Upland mesoregion. The district's terrain is characterized by little variation in elevation. The difference in elevation between the highest and lowest points is approximately 20 meters. The highest-elevation areas are the intersection of Siemianowicka and Styczniowa streets, as well as the Zielony Zakątek Park along Wiertnicza Street. Elevations in these areas exceed 275 m above sea level. The lowest point, at an elevation of approximately 255 m above sea level, is located in the Brynica river valley near the tripoint of the borders of Katowice, Czeladź, and Sosnowiec. The higher-lying part of Dąbrówka Mała (the western and southern parts of the district) forms part of the Siemianowice Upland, while the lower-lying northern part is part of the Brynica valley. The area of the Siemianowice Upland and the Brynica valley have been heavily transformed by human activity due to settlement and the historical extraction and processing of mineral resources, especially coal. Additionally, the landscape consists of man-made landforms in the form of road and railway embankments. Almost the entire district has been anthropogenically leveled, and the area of the Dąbrówka Mała-Centrum Wastewater Treatment Plant is a mining subsidence basin.

=== Soils ===
In Dąbrówka Mała, due to the high level of human impact on the area, the soils have been significantly altered by human activity, resulting in anthrosols where humans are the dominant soil-forming factor. The southern part is composed of soils formed from alluvial clays, while the northern part consists of clayey sands. Due to urban development and industrial activity, these soils have been largely devastated and degraded. They are also contaminated with heavy metals, including those located in forested areas at the forest litter level.

Soils in Dąbrówka Mała are mainly of classes III and IV. Class III soils are found mostly in the western part of the district along Siemianowicka and J. Biniszkiewicz streets, on the south side of Styczniowa Street, and also along Strzelców Bytomskich Street opposite the Volunteer Fire Department station. Class IV soils extend along Milowicka Street, in the area of Stary Czekaj, Żwirowa and Wyrobiskowa streets, west of J. Grzegorzek Street, as well as along Pod Młynem Street, Henri Le Rond Street, and the northern part of Styczniowa Street.

=== Climate ===
The climate of Dąbrówka Mała does not differ significantly from that of Katowice as a whole, but it is modified by local factors (microclimate). The area has a transitional temperate climate, with oceanic influences predominating over continental ones. Westerly winds dominate (accounting for about 60% of the total), with easterly and southerly winds being less prevalent. The average annual temperature for the 1961–2005 period at the nearby station in Muchowiec is 8.1°C, but the urban heat island effect is also noticeable there, which locally modifies the air temperature. The warmest month is July (17.8°C), and the coldest is January (–2.2°C). The average annual sunshine duration for the 1966–2005 period was 1,474 hours. The average annual precipitation for the 1951–2005 period was 713.8 mm.

The microclimate of Dąbrówka Mała depends on the degree of forest cover, urbanization, and its location relative to river valleys. The southern part of the district (south of the line formed by Pod Młynem and Strzelców Bytomskich streets) lies within the microclimate of developed, higher-elevation valleys, where conditions are moderately favorable. With dense development and paved areas, the air heats up more quickly during the day and, with lower humidity, loses heat more quickly. The area directly in the Brynica and Śmiłowski Trench valleys has an unfavourable microclimate. Due to more frequent heat radiation, fog and ground frost occur more often there. The remaining area has an intermediate microclimate with moderately favorable conditions – there, the reduced amount of water counteracts heat loss.

=== Surface and groundwater ===
The entire area of Dąbrówka Mała is located within the Vistula drainage basin, in the catchment area of two rivers: the Brynica (northern part of the district) and the Rawa (southern part). A fourth-order drainage divide between the Brynica and Rawa catchments runs through the intersection of Siemianowicka and Poranna streets, then east along Henri Le Rond Street, then southeast along the railroad tracks and Walenty Roździeński Avenue to the northeast.

The Brynica river flows toward the border between Katowice and Mysłowice. In Dąbrówka Mała, it also forms the city's northeastern border. The average flow rate of the Brynica at the border between Dąbrówka Mała and Czeladź, with a 50% probability, is 5.50 m³/s. The Śmiłowski Trench also flows through the Brynica catchment, running parallel to Strzelców Bytomskich Street, and then flowing into the Brynica near the animal shelter on Milowicka Street.

Although the Rawa river's catchment includes the district, the river does not flow directly through Dąbrówka Mała.

The hydrographic network of Dąbrówka Mała is heavily anthropogenized as a result of human activity, especially due to historical coal mining and its consequences, which has led to the continuous regulation of the Rawa and Brynica rivers. The Brynica in Dąbrówka Mała has a lined and embanked channel. Additionally, to prevent the formation of floodplains, the riverbed was raised, which led to the loss of hydraulic connectivity between the Brynica and the groundwater.

There are no water reservoirs in Dąbrówka Mała.

According to Paczyński's 1995 regionalization, Dąbrówka Mała is located within the XII Silesian-Kraków hydrogeological region. The district lies within the boundaries of Groundwater Body No. 111. One of the Main Groundwater Reservoirs – No. 329 Bytom – is located beneath the northern part of Dąbrówka Mała. It carries fissure-karst-porous water within a profile of Triassic carbonate formations.

=== Nature and environmental protection ===
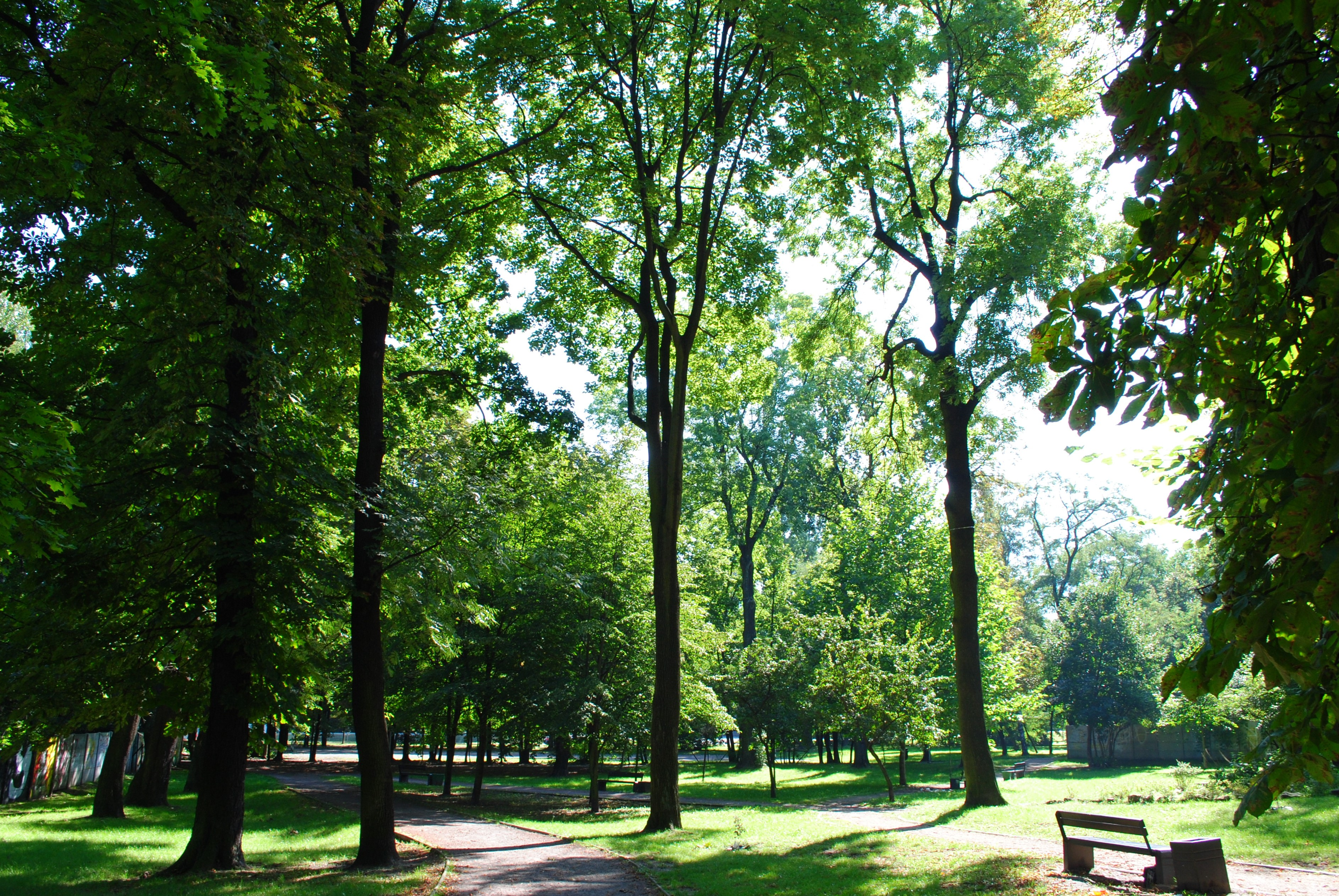
Park in Dąbrówka Mała as seen from Strzelców Bytomskich Street

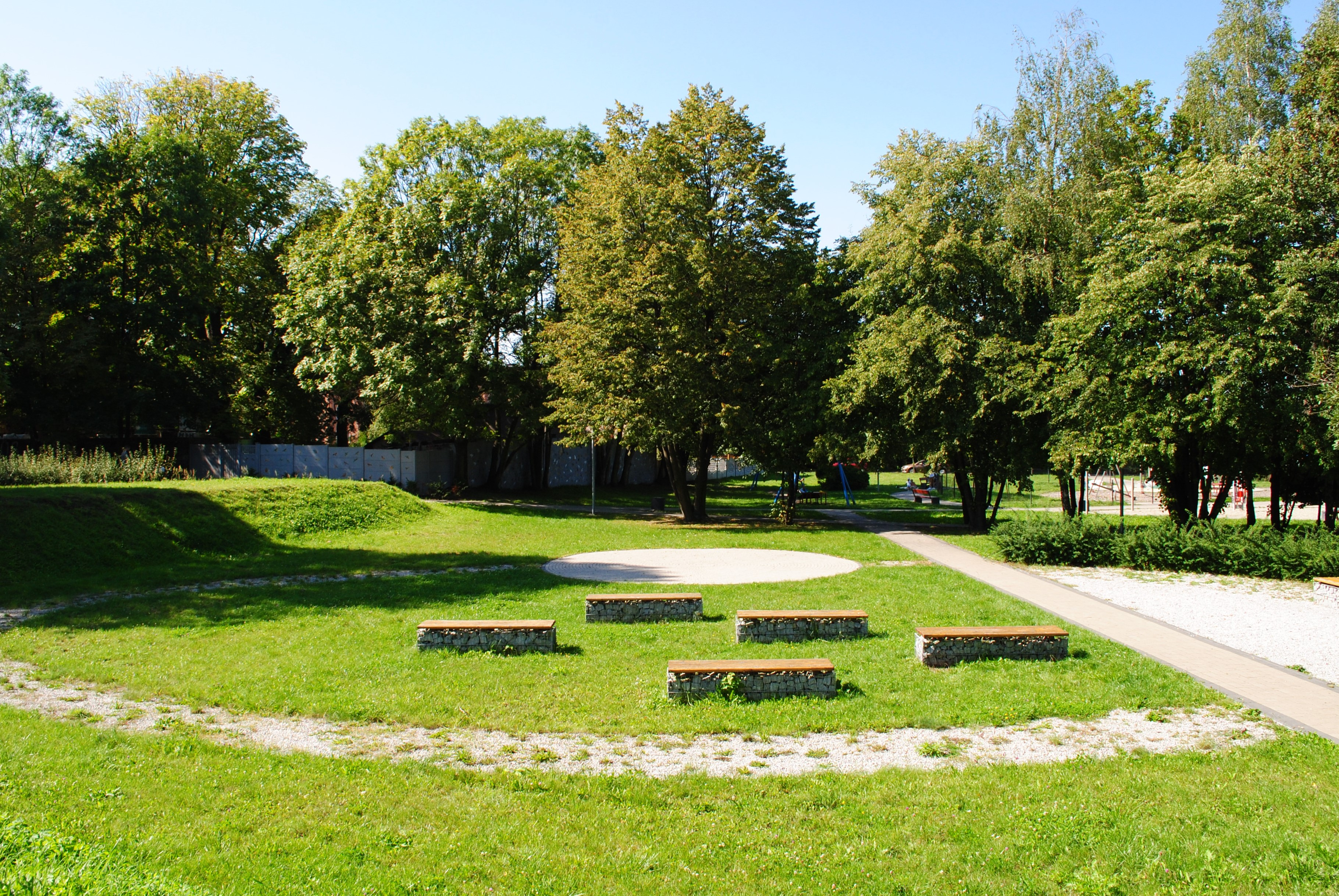
Part of the Zielony Zakątek Park

Dąbrówka Mała has been largely urbanized, resulting in a limited amount of green space, mostly in the form of man-made greenery (mainly family allotment gardens, parks, cemeteries, squares, and recreational areas). Larger areas of tree-lined and undeveloped green spaces in Dąbrówka Mała are found around the Dąbrówka Mała-Centrum Wastewater Treatment Plant between Strzelców Bytomskich and Milowicka streets, in the area between Techników Street and Walenty Roździeński Avenue, as well as in the form of wasteland in the block bounded by W. Siwek, Styczniowa, and Siemianowicka streets.

Due to significant environmental changes, the successional tendency in terms of potential vegetation is unknown for a large part of Dąbrówka Mała. In the remaining area – in the Brynica valley – the potential vegetation consists of lowland alder and ash-alder riparian forests in water-soil habitats that are periodically slightly waterlogged. In devastated and transformed areas, synanthropic vegetation predominates, found in ruderal habitats, including mugwort and burdock, while trampled areas are covered by carpet-like communities of broadleaf plantain and ryegrass. In terms of fauna, species typical of human habitats are found there, such as the house sparrow and rock dove, as well as jackdaws, magpies, blackbirds, rooks, and starlings. In allotment gardens, cemeteries, and landscaped urban green spaces, the most common birds are tits, jays, starlings, chaffinches, and blackbirds.

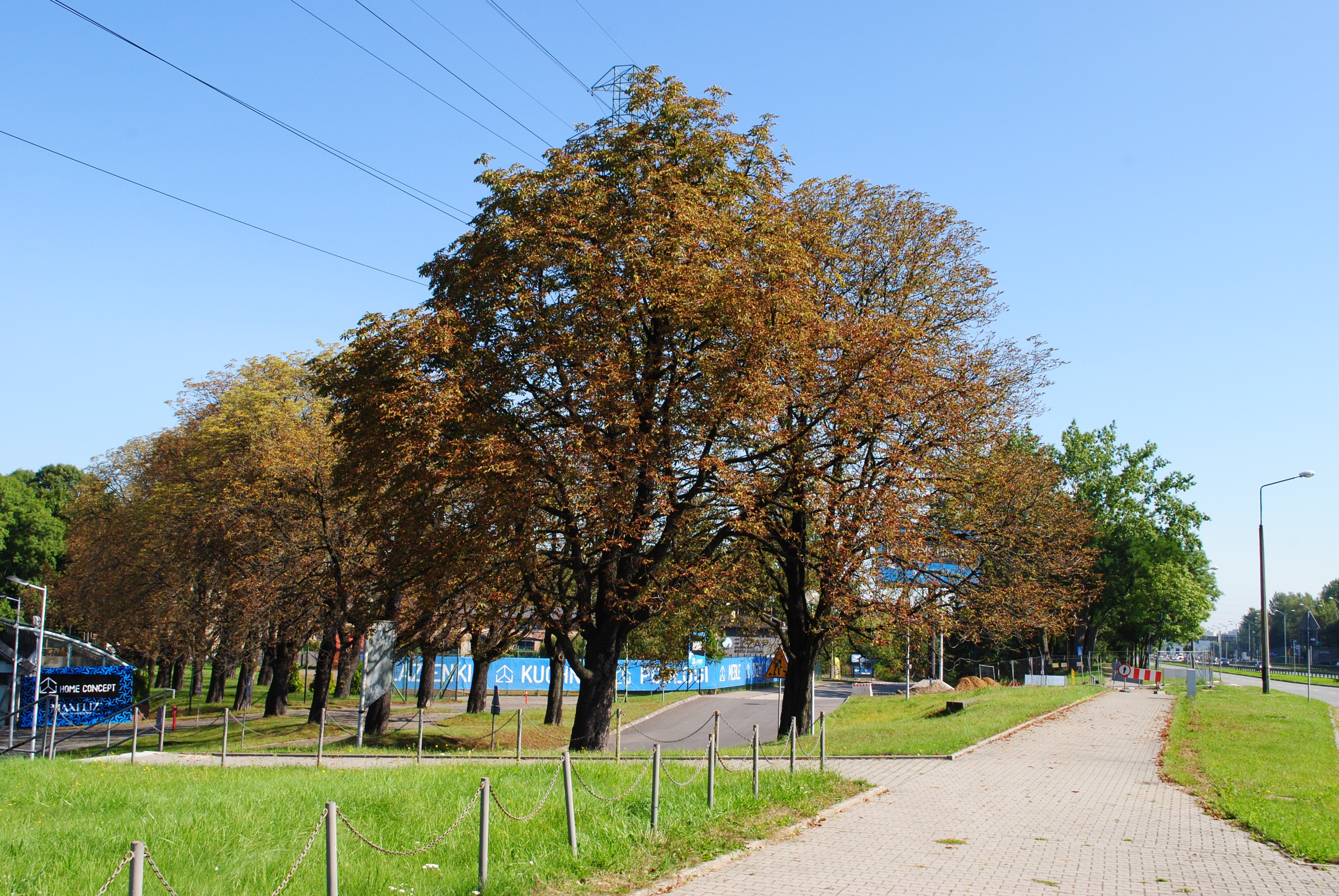
Avenue of horse chestnuts near the former folwark buildings

There are no designated nature conservation areas or natural monuments in Dąbrówka Mała. However, the Brynica valley is an area of high ecological value, covering 25.0 hectares; it consists of open land that forms part of the degraded Brynica wildlife corridor. In the landscaped green areas, there are also trees and monumental avenues. Among them, there is an avenue of 28 horse chestnuts near the old folwark, with trunk circumferences reaching 300 cm.

The following landscaped green spaces are located in the district:

- Soldiers of September Square – a square at the intersection of Milowicka, J. Haller, and Strzelców Bytomskich streets. It has a monument and a playground;
- Park in Dąbrówka – a park near the intersection of Strzelców Bytomskich and Pod Młynem streets;
- Zielony Zakątek park – a park in the area of J. Biniszkiewicz and Henri Le Rond streets, equipped with, among other things, a skatepark, playground, and outdoor gym.

Allotment gardens in Dąbrówka Mała are administered by the Silesian Regional Board of the Polish Allotment Garden Association, Katowice Branch. The following gardens are located there:

Garden name	Location	Area (ha)	Number of plots (2007)
Bratek, Colony 1	J. Haller Street	0.98	35
Bratek, Colony 2	Strzelców Bytomskich Street	3.26	80
Stokrotka	Strzelców Bytomskich Street	1.94	50

== History ==
=== Origins ===
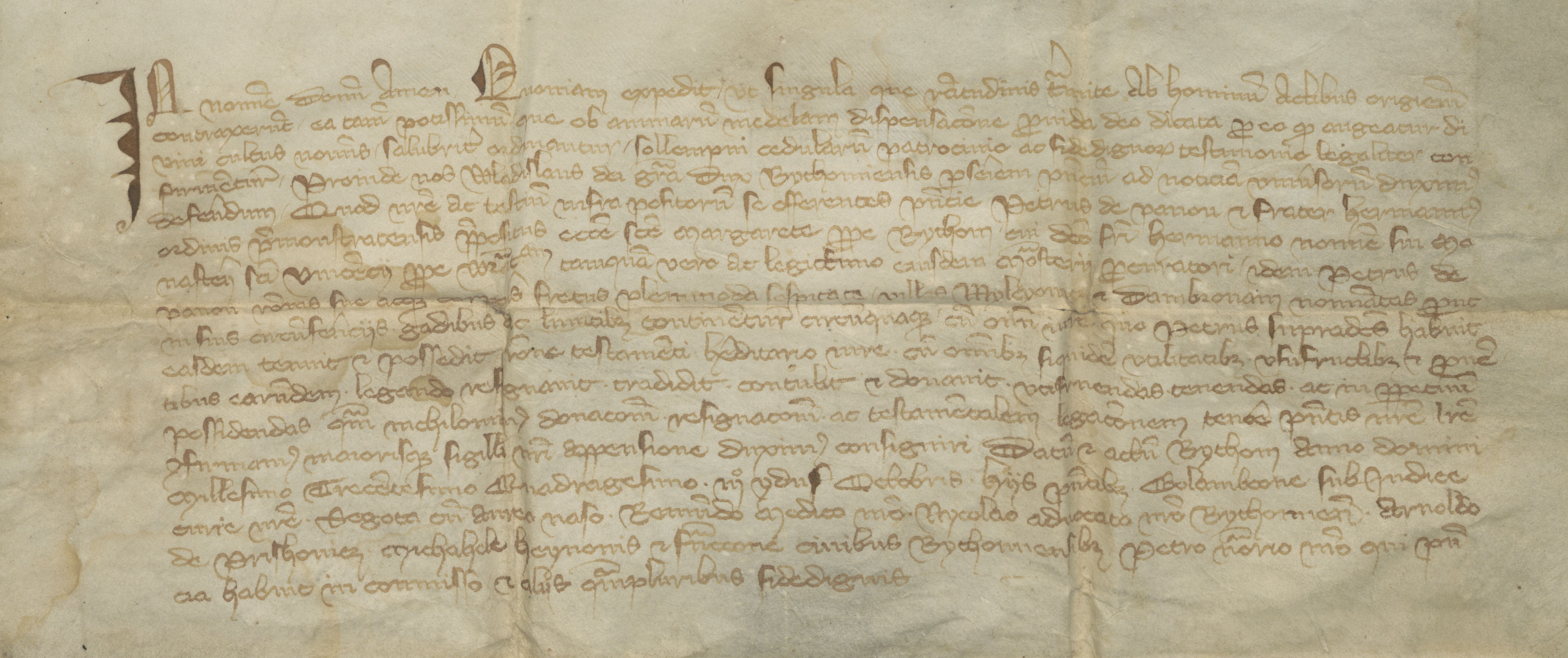
Oldest document mentioning Dąbrówka Mała

The founding of Dąbrówka Mała, then located in the Duchy of Siewierz by the Brynica river, dates back to the 14th century. The earliest mention of the village is found in a document of 13 October 1340, in which Piotr of Paniów donated his estates – the settlements of Milowice and Dąbrówka Mała – "to the ownership of the Order of St. Vincent". The document was issued by Władysław, Duke of Bytom, who confirmed Piotr of Paniów's donation. The village was mentioned in 1576 in a letter by Mikołaj Salomon as an area within the boundaries of the village of Milejowice (now Milowice – a district of Sosnowiec). In the 16th century, it was a folwark owned by the Abbey of St. James in Wrocław. On 16 July 1667, it was purchased by the Dobrzyń deputy cup-bearer – Jakub Czarnkowski of Czarnocin, known as Celary (hence, on old maps, the village appeared as Celary-Dąbrówka). Until the end of the 17th century, Dąbrówka Mała belonged to the Parish of St. Stanislaus in Czeladź, and subsequently, until the construction of the current parish church in 1912, it belonged to the parish in Bogucice.

As part of Silesia, Dąbrówka Mała became part of the Kingdom of Prussia in 1742, and from 1815 it was located within the borders of the Province of Silesia – in the Bytom County (German: Landkreis Beuthen-Tarnowitz), Oppeln. In 1783, 73 people lived there. In the 18th century, the Pod Młynem hamlet was established near Dąbrówka Mała. The name derived from the watermill that operated there on the Brynica, which was owned by Katarzyna Młynarzanka in 1714. From 1742 to 1795, the village lay directly on the border between Prussia and Poland (until 1790, this section of the border was identical to the border between Prussia and the Duchy of Siewierz along the Brynica).

=== 19th century ===
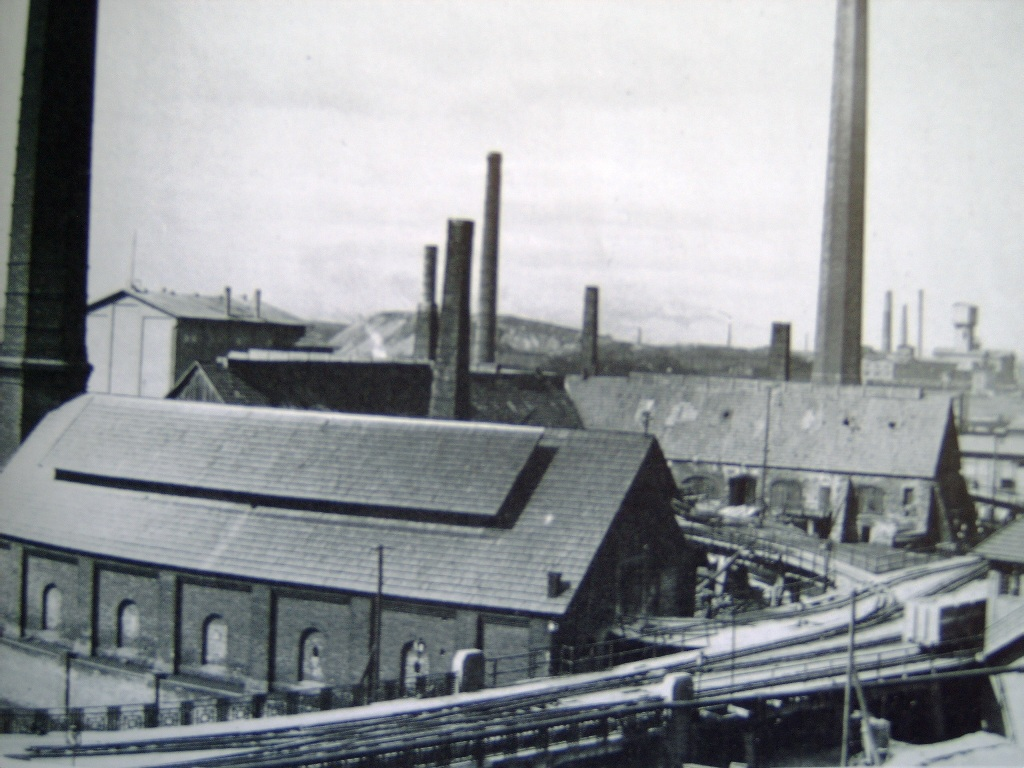
Paul Zinc Smelter in Burowiec in a photograph from 1900

In the 19th century, Dąbrówka Mała was owned by the Mieroszewski family (purchased from Jan Kamiński in 1824), and later by the Winckler family. The character of the village began to be influenced by the coal mining and metallurgy industries located there. In 1844, coal was mined from the Norma and Georg fields, belonging to the first Georg Coal Mine, through the Norma, Maschinenschacht, Glückschacht, and Pachalyschacht shafts. Between 1844 and 1885, mining in Pniaki was carried out by the Gute Zuflucht Coal Mine, which produced 24,000 tons of coal in 1873. By 1845, Dąbrówka was already a large village with 654 inhabitants. Thanks to the mining and metallurgical industries, it experienced rapid development. From the mid-19th century until the start of World War II, in addition to the Georg Coal Mine (1844–1928, known under the Polish name "Jerzy" from 1922), the Abendstern Coal Mine (known as "Jutrzenka" from 1922) also operated, along with the Paul Zinc Smelter (1861–1928, known as "Paweł" from 1922) and the Walhter-Croneck silver and lead smelter (1864–1939). In 1854, the Germania zinc oxide factory was opened. In 1869, the shafts of the Morgenstern Coal Mine were deepened (mining was suspended in 1885, and in 1905 the mine was merged with the Georg Coal Mine).

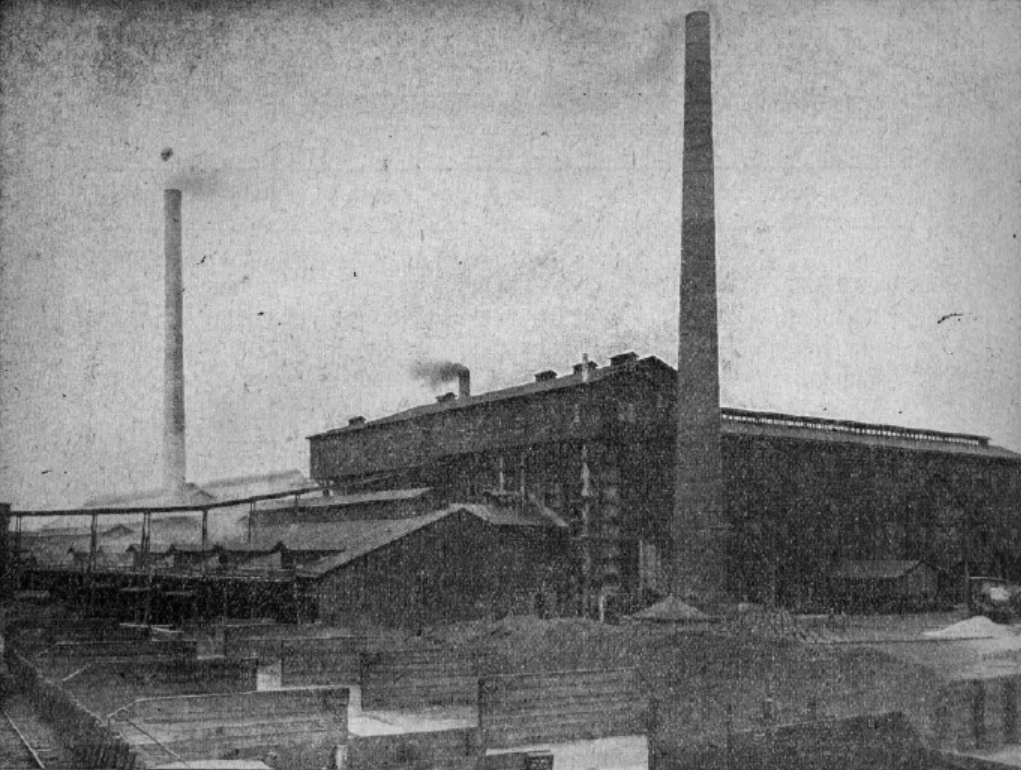
Walther Croneck Lead Smelter in Burowiec in an interwar photograph

In 1861, Dąbrówka Mała had a population of 2,171, but by 1873 – as a result of its exclusion from Gmina Burowiec and the manor district – this number had fallen to 1,590. In 1894, however, Burowiec was once again incorporated into Gmina Dąbrówka Mała. In 1873, the gmina was incorporated into the newly established Katowice County (German: Landkreis Kattowitz). It belonged to the district court in Mysłowice and had its own post office, established in 1894.

Between 1848 and 1877, as a result of mining operations, four springs and 60 wells dried up in the areas of Dąbrówka Mała, Wełnowiec, Józefowiec, Dąb, and Katowice. In 1896, a new water source began to be exploited in the area of the Rozalia zinc and lead mine. The resources of this water supply system were used by Katowice and neighboring towns and gminas. On 6 October 1895, the Volunteer Fire Department was established.

At the beginning of the 20th century, the town hall and the Baroque Revival Church of St. Anthony of Padua were built; the main initiator of the construction was the parson of Bogucice, Father Ludwik Skowronek. In 1913, land was consecrated for a new parish cemetery.

=== Silesian Uprisings and the plebiscite ===
Between 1919 and 1921, the residents of Dąbrówka Mała took an active part in the Silesian Uprisings (a commemorative plaque in the parish church is dedicated to them), and later in the plebiscite (63% of voters from Gmina Dąbrówka Mała voted in favor of joining Poland). On 18 August 1919, the settlement was captured by a group of insurgents led by Jan Żychoń (the unit was retreating from Ochojec). On 20 August 1919, the combat groups from Dąbrówka Mała and Bogucice united in the village. On the same day, these units attacked German reconnaissance aircraft (one of which was shot down and destroyed). A day later, under pressure from the Grenzschutz, the insurgents were forced to retreat toward Sosnowiec and Mysłowice. In 1920, Dąbrówka Mała served as the headquarters of the Second Silesian Uprising. From 6 May 1921, the rectory building was home to, among others, Wojciech Korfanty (on 7–9 May, he conducted negotiations there regarding a truce with the German side, which ultimately failed).

=== Interwar years and World War II ===
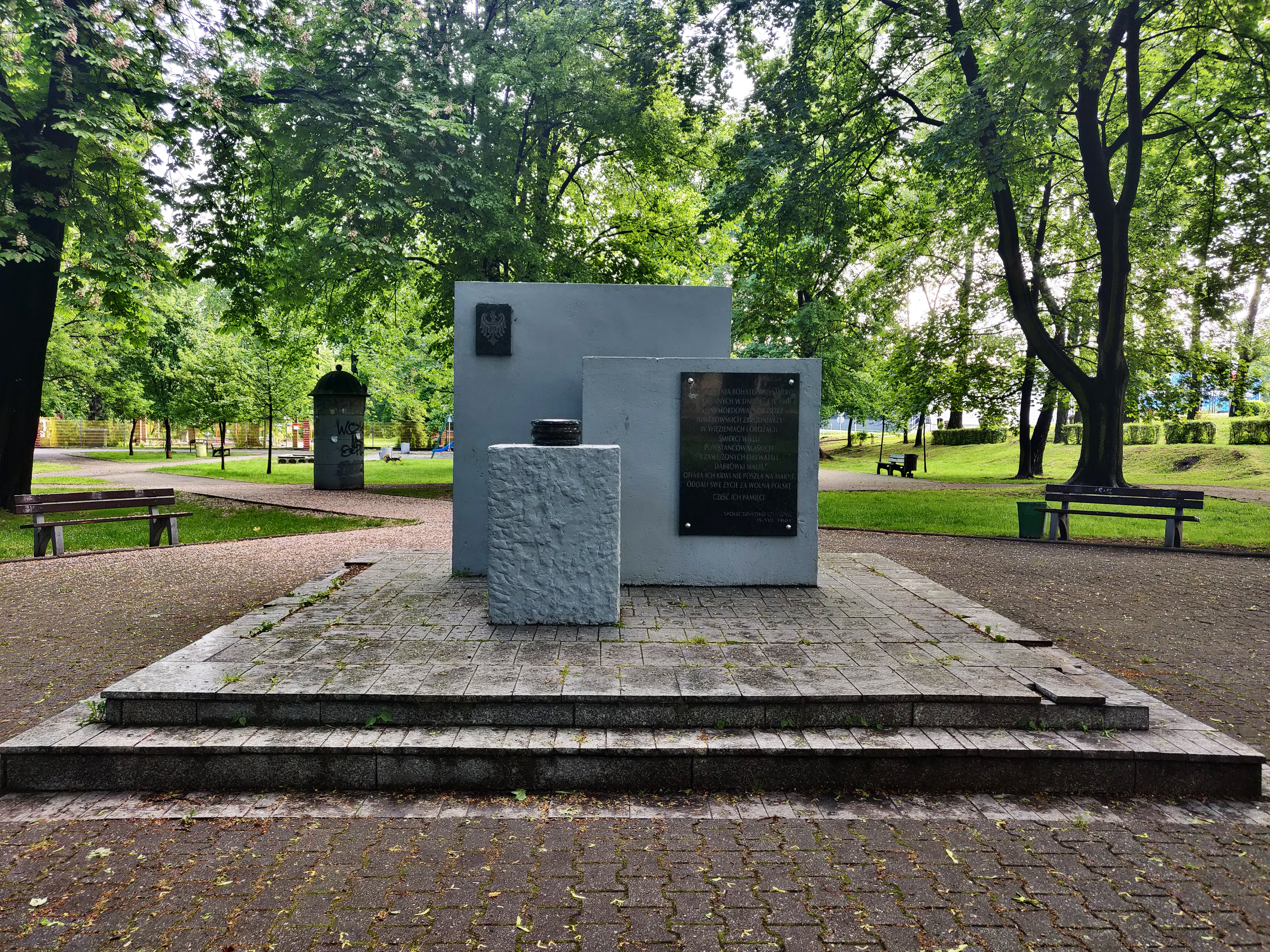
Monument commemorating former Silesian insurgents and distinguished citizens who died during World War II, located at Soldiers of September Square

On 25 January 1920, a branch of the Sokół Gymnastic Society in Silesia was established in Dąbrówka Mała, which had 55 members that year. Between 1922 and 1939, the settlement was located within the boundaries of Katowice County in the Silesian Voivodeship. In 1924, the Dąbrówka Mała manor area was reincorporated into the gmina, and the Polska Coal Mine was opened (renamed "Dąbrówka Śląska" in 1937). In 1926, the settlement had 9,500 inhabitants, and in 1936, 10,150. In 1928, the Jerzy Coal Mine was closed, leading to numerous public protests. During the interwar period, the Capitol Cinema was built using donations from the parishioners of Dąbrówka. In the 1930s, the remains of Pleistocene animals were discovered in the sandpit area (held in the collections of the Silesian Museum until 1939).

During World War II, the German Polenlager No. 4 Eichenau was located in Dąbrówka Mała. On 3–4 April 1940, in retaliation for the murder of the local police commander, the German occupiers shot 40 hostages (near the spoil tip of the former Jerzy Coal Mine).

=== Postwar years ===
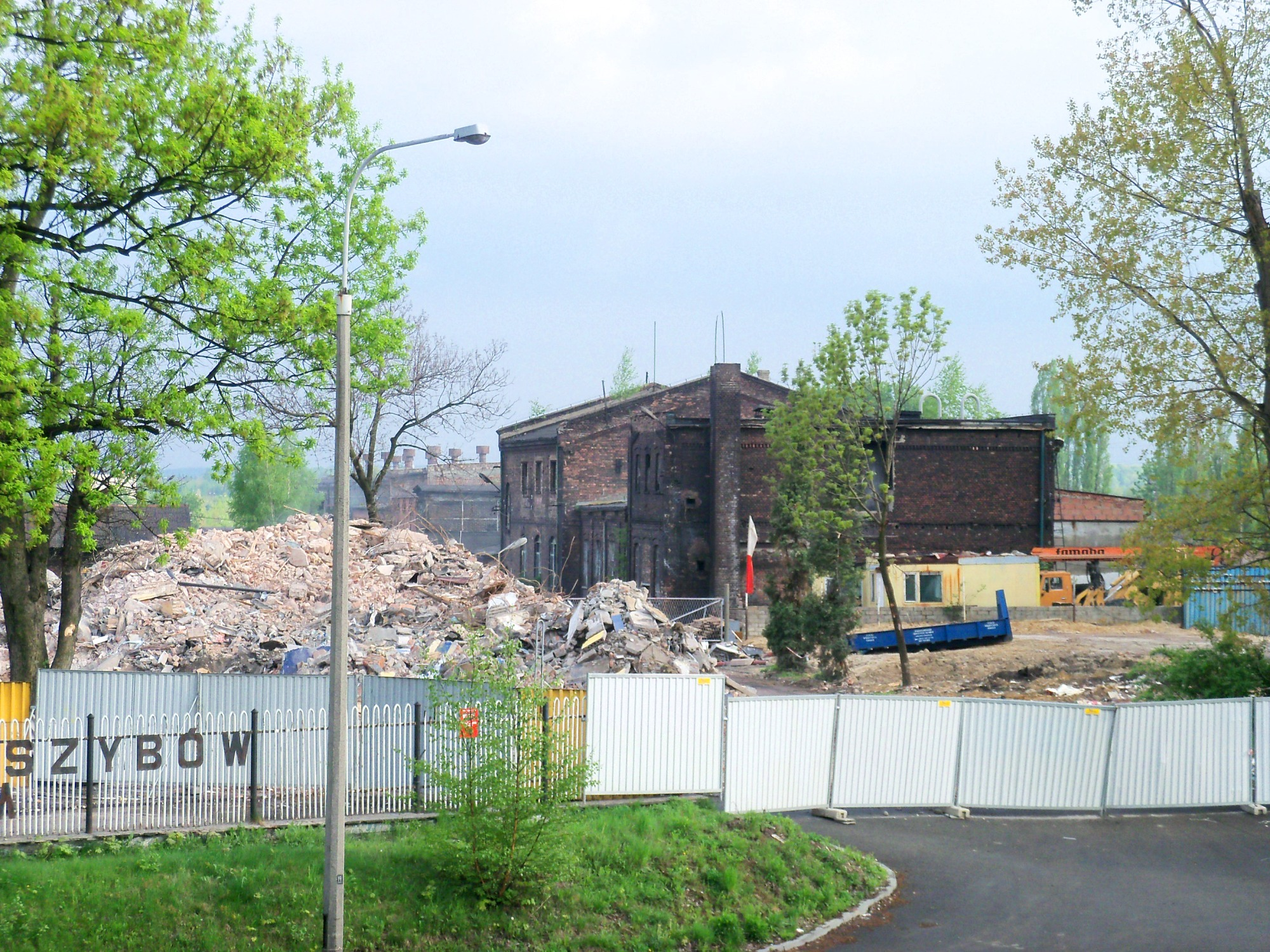
Buildings of the former Jerzy Coal Mine being demolished in 2011

Until 1951, the settlement was the seat of Gmina Dąbrówka Mała, after which it was incorporated into Szopienice, and on 31 December 1959, along with Szopienice, into Katowice.

Between 1950 and 1956, Walenty Roździeński Avenue was constructed; initially, it was a two-way, single-lane road, widened between 1963 and 1965. A series of murders that garnered nationwide attention between 1964 and 1970, attributed to Zdzisław Marchwicki, began on 7 November 1964 in Dąbrówka Mała with the murder of Anna Mycek. In 1965, apartment buildings were built in the area of Józef Haller Street and Walenty Roździeński Avenue (Osiedle Przedwiośnie; currently in Szopienice-Burowiec). Between 1978 and 1983, a grade-separated intersection was built at the junction of Walenty Roździeński Avenue with Józef Haller Street. In the late 1980s, a municipal shelter for homeless animals was established.

Since 1 January 1992, Dąbrówka Mała has been the 14th auxiliary unit of the city of Katowice. On the 100th anniversary of the founding of the Dąbrówka Mała Volunteer Fire Department – 7 October 1995 – a new banner was presented. In 1997, the district had a population of 5,900. In 2011, the buildings of the former Jerzy Coal Mine at 214 Walenty Roździeński Avenue n Szopienice-Burowiec were completely demolished.

== Demographics ==
Population structure in Dąbrówka Mała by gender and age (as of 31 December 2015)
Period/Number of inhabitants	0–18 years	18–60/65 years	over 60/65 years	Total
Total	987	3,379	897	5,263
women	514	1,613	606	2,733
men	473	1,766	291	2,530
Femininity ratio	109	91	208	108

From the 16th century onward (when it was mentioned as uninhabited land within the boundaries of the village of Milejowice – present-day Milowice), the settlement's population grew steadily. The first recorded figure dates from 1783 – 73 people. From the mid-19th century, the village's population began to grow: by 1845, it had reached 654 people. Ten years later, the population had doubled – 1,321 people. By 1861, it had already reached 2,171 inhabitants. The largest increase occurred at the turn of the 19th and 20th centuries. It was linked to the establishment of new mines and smelters in the area. The population consisted mainly of workers from these facilities and their families. In 1890, the town had a population of 5,062. At the beginning of the 20th century, in 1905 and 1910, the population stood at 7,311 and 8,431, respectively. During the Second Polish Republic, the trend of demographic growth in Dąbrówka Mała continued. Thus, in 1926 the population stood at 9,500, in 1936 at 10,150, and by 1939 it had declined slightly to 9,832 people.

After World War II – in 1946 – the present-day district had a population of 9,107. In the second half of the 20th century, the population of Dąbrówka Mała declined by approximately 42% (mainly due to the separation of Burowiec from Dąbrówka, which began to be included in Szopienice). In 1988, 6,249 people lived in the district, with the 15–29 and 30–44 age groups being the most numerous. The downward trend continued into the early 21st century. In 2005, the district had 5,500 residents, and in 2007, 5,411. That year, the number of residents aged 15–29 and 45–59 was roughly equal. The smallest group consisted of people aged 14 and under. In 2015, 5,263 people lived in Dąbrówka Mała.

Sources: 1783; 1845; 1855; 1861; 1890; 1905; 1910; 1926; 1936; 1939; 1946; 1988; 2005; 2010; 2015; 2019.

Projections developed in 2007 estimated the population of Dąbrówka Mała under the pessimistic scenario at 5,244 people in 2010 (99.5% of the 2007 figure), 5,076 people in 2020 (98.5%), and 4,663 people in 2030 (88.5%). In the optimistic scenario, the number of residents was estimated at 5,251 in 2010 (99.7% of the 2007 figure), 5,153 in 2020 (97.8%), and 4,828 in 2030 (91.6%). Taking into account the post-migration forecast of the population actually residing in Dąbrówka Mała, 5,627 people were projected for 2020 (including 5,484 permanent residents), and 5,577 residents are projected for 2030 (including 5,434 permanent residents).

== Politics and administration ==
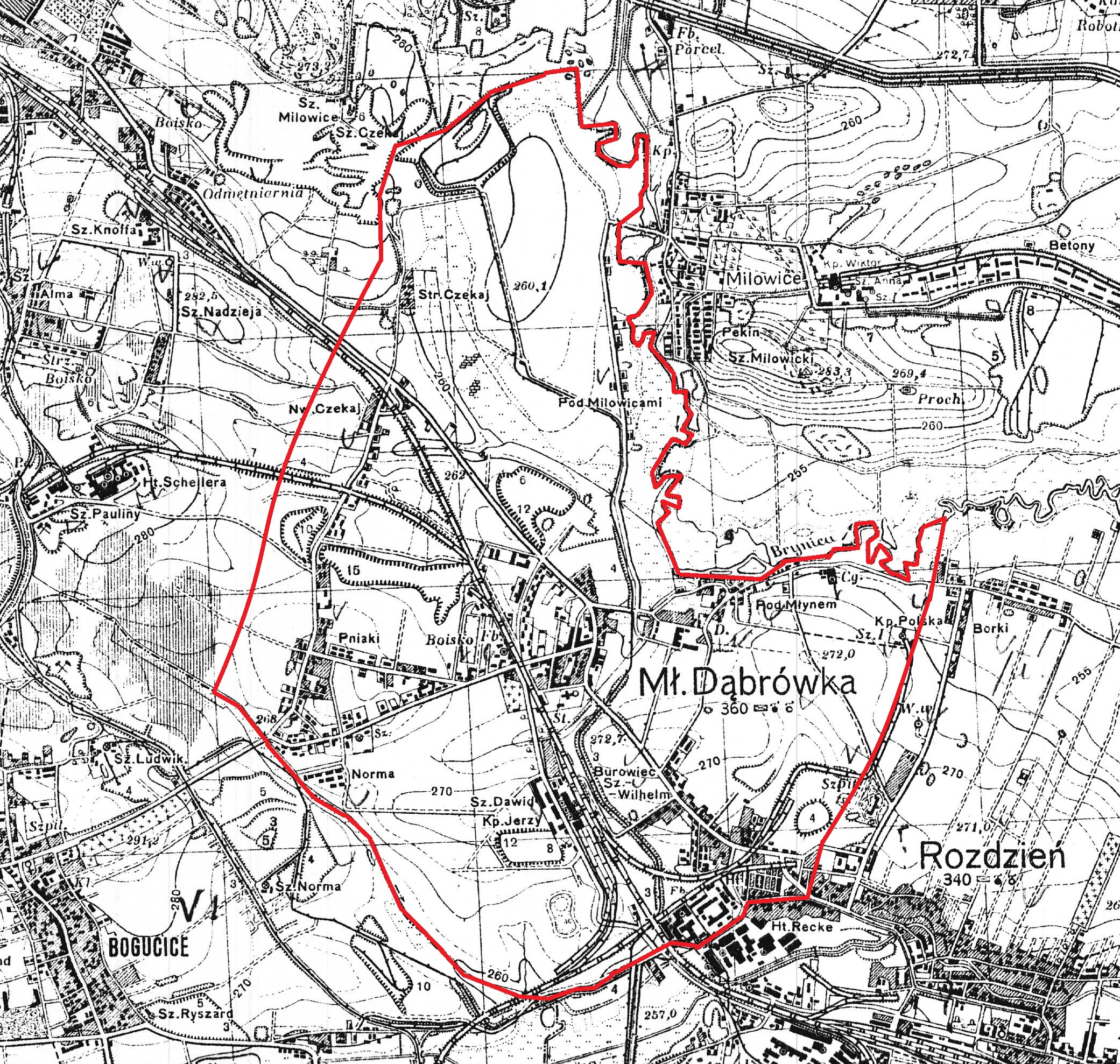
Boundaries of the former Gmina Dąbrówka Mała on a map from 1933

At the time of its founding in the 15th century, Dąbrówka Mała was a village in the Duchy of Siewierz. Over the course of several centuries, it had various owners. In 1839, the manor estate and Gmina Dąbrówka Mała were leased to Maria Wincklerowa, and later to the Thiele-Winckler family. At the beginning of the 20th century, in 1907, the building of Gmina Dąbrówka Mała town hall, currently located at 16 Henri Le Rond Street, was opened. At that time, the rural gmina also included, among others, the settlements and colonies of Pniaki, Stary Czekaj, Nowy Czekaj, Norma, and Burowiec (the last of these settlements is currently located within Szopienice-Burowiec). After the Silesian Uprisings, Gmina Dąbrówka Mała was incorporated into Poland and became part of the autonomous Silesian Voivodeship. In 1951, in connection with the dissolution of the Katowice County, Dąbrówka Mała was incorporated into Szopienice County, and on 31 December 1959, it became a district of Katowice.

On 1 January 1992, 22 Local Government Auxiliary Units were established in Katowice, including the Dąbrówka Mała unit. On 29 September 1997, the Katowice City Council adopted a new division of the city into auxiliary local government units, designating Dąbrówka Mała as the 14th auxiliary unit and simultaneously defining its exact boundaries.

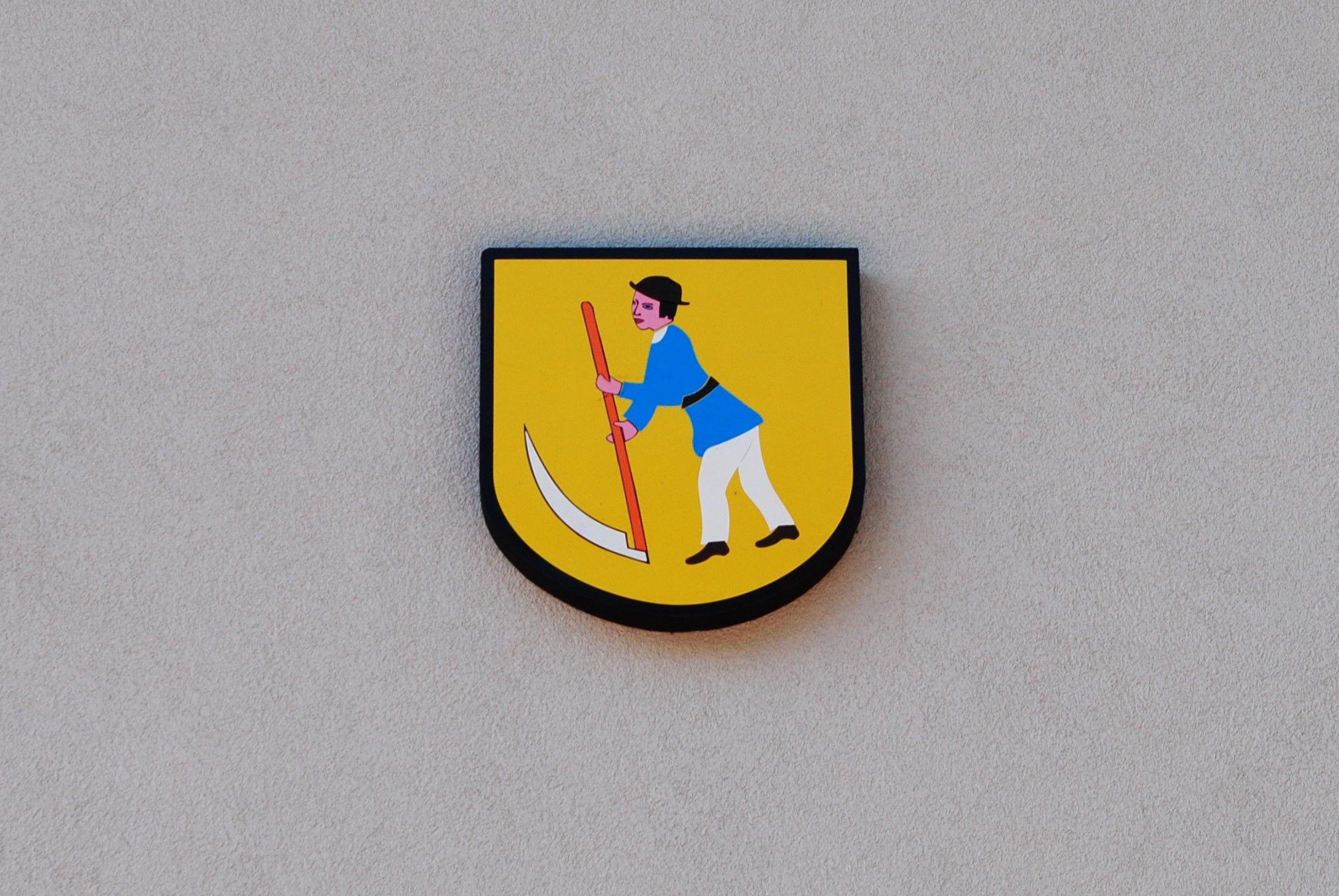
Coat of arms of the former Gmina Dąbrówka Mała at the Volunteer Fire Department station on Strzelców Bytomskich Street

In city council elections, Dąbrówka Mała belongs to District No. 2 (Dąbrówka Mała, Szopienice-Burowiec, Janów-Nikiszowiec, Giszowiec, and Murcki). From 2018 to 2023, this district had 5 representatives on the City Council.

On 1 March 2015, elections to the Council of Auxiliary Unit No. 14 Dąbrówka Mała were held for the first time in history. 15 council members were elected for a four-year term, and the first session took place on 15 April 2015. The unit's executive board was elected at that time. Voter turnout was 12.38% (4,298 people were eligible to vote; 532 people voted). The current District Council No. 14 Dąbrówka Mała is headquartered in the school at 5 Techników Street.

=== Seal ===
The earliest depiction of Dąbrówka Mała comes from the inventory of the Bogucice parish of 26 March 1816, in which the sołtyses of the settlements belonging to the parish affixed their seals. The seal of the sołtys of Dąbrówka Mała depicted a peasant in a hat with a scythe (the so-called reaper) on a gold background. In the coat of arms of the seal from 1816, the reaper wears a hat, but in later seals, he no longer does. The gmina's seals were taken out of use on 20 March 1950.

== Economy ==
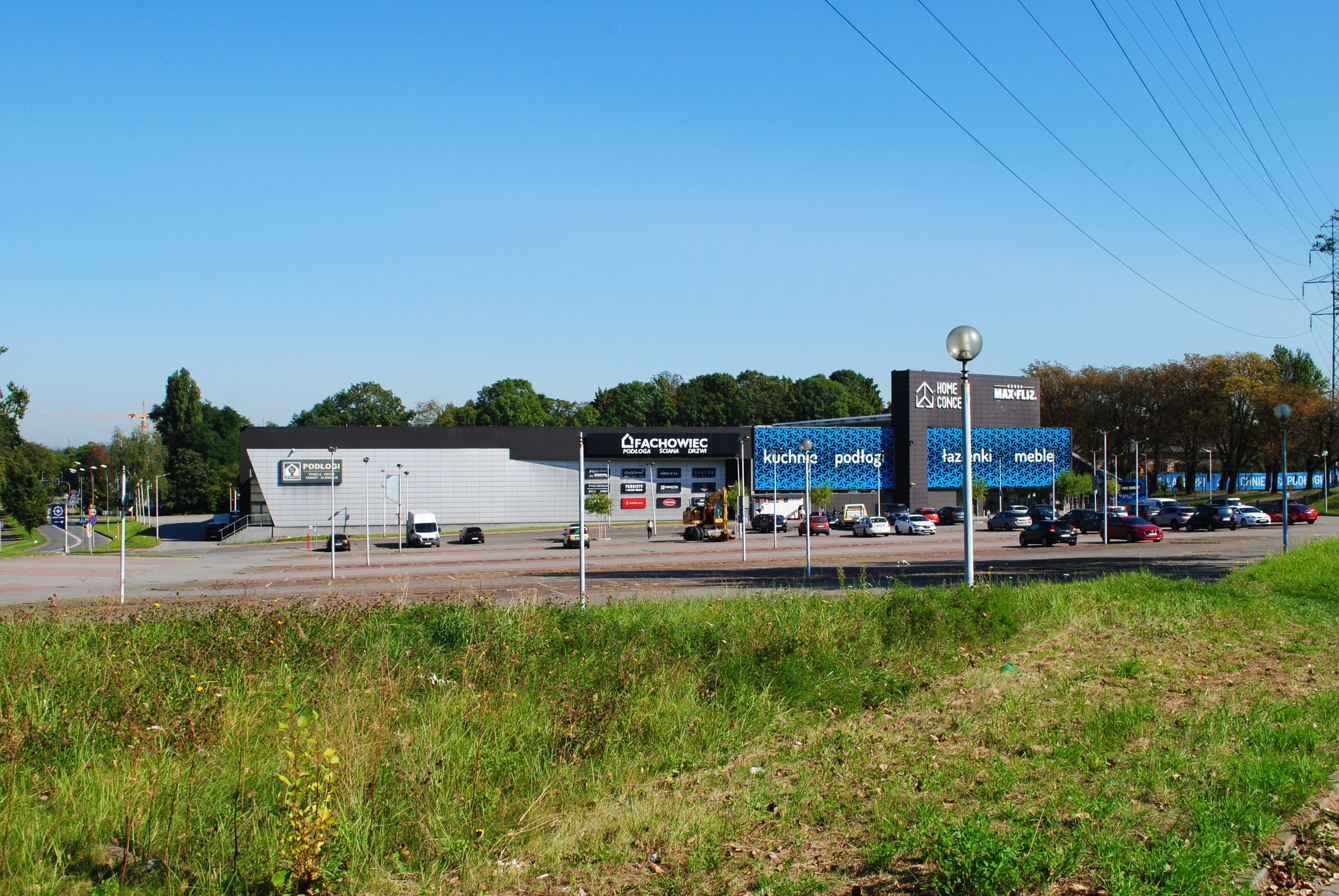
Home Concept interior design gallery

Until World War II, the district was typically industrial in character (steel mills and numerous mines, which were closed before World War II). Today, there are no active mines there, but the commercial and service sectors are well developed. Approximately 50% of the district's land consists of industrial and post-industrial areas. In 2007, production and service areas covered 25.0 hectares, while service areas covered 35.8 hectares.

As of 31 December 2013, there were 641 business entities registered in the district in the REGON system, accounting for 1.4% of all entities in Katowice, of which 591 were microenterprises (110 enterprises per 1,000 district residents). In 2013, there were 210 registered unemployed people in Dąbrówka Mała – in terms of the ratio of unemployed residents to the total population, Dąbrówka Mała had the 5th highest rate among the 22 districts (after Szopienice-Burowiec, Załęże, Śródmieście, and Dąb).

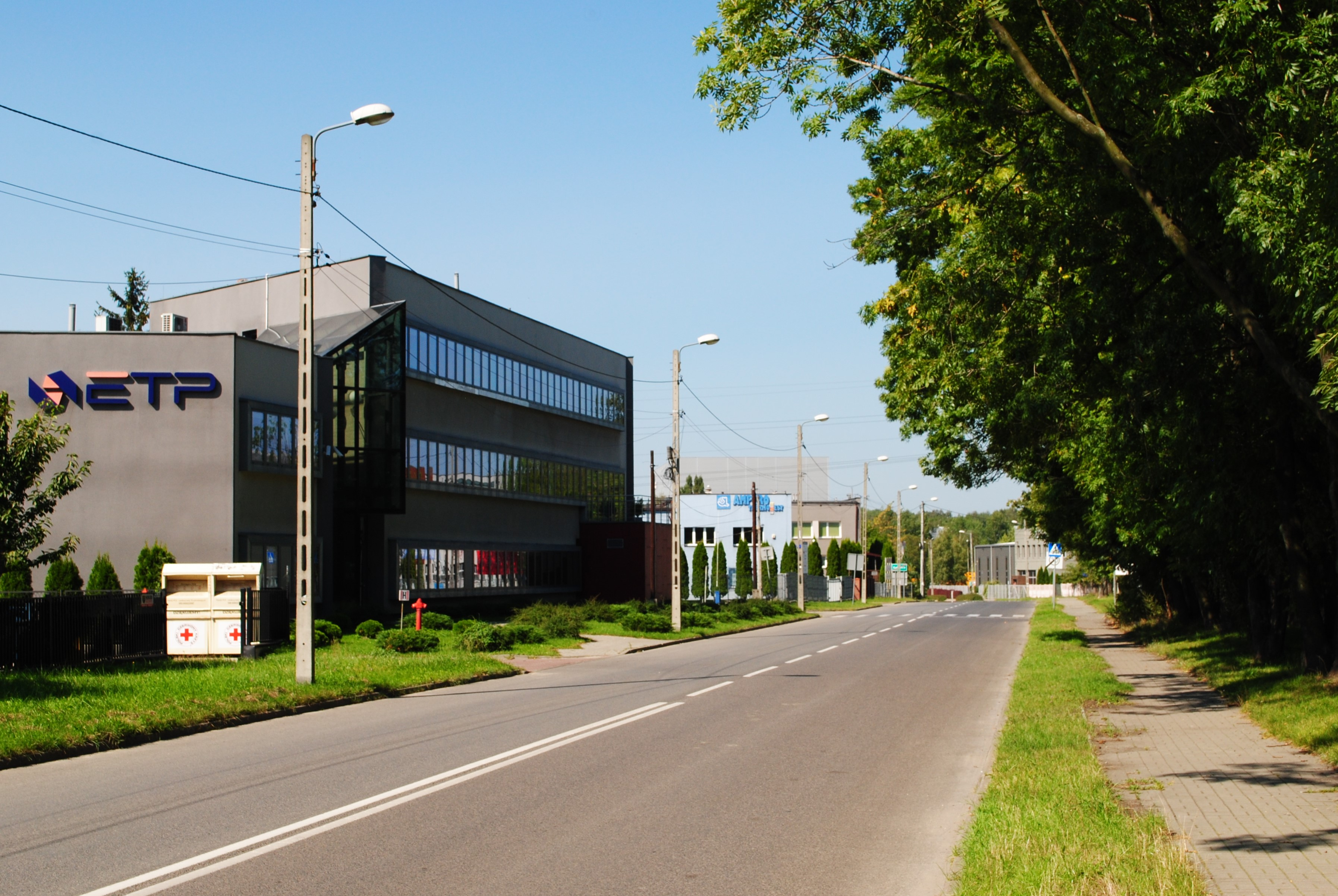
Industrial and commercial buildings on Budowlana Street

Due to its convenient location, Dąbrówka Mała is home to a concentration of commercial enterprises across various industries, especially in the furniture and home furnishings sectors. On the northern side of Walenty Roździeński Avenue, which administratively lies within Dąbrówka Mała, as of September 2020, the following major businesses and stores are located there: HOMEPARK Rawa (97 Walenty Roździeński Avenue; a shopping center with stores offering furniture and home furnishings), IKEA Katowice (95 Walenty Roździeński Avenue), Komandor Showroom Katowice (70 J. Haller Street), Home Concept Interior Design Gallery (191 Walenty Roździeński Avenue; a center with interior design showrooms), Nowy Roździeń (199 Walenty Roździeński Avenue; interior design center), and the shopping complex at 201 and 203 Walenty Roździeński Avenue (formerly Nowosam-Roździeń, built in 1978).

Other areas in Dąbrówka Mała where economic activity is concentrated include Siemianowicka and Budowlana streets (on the border with Siemianowice Śląskie), where there are auto repair shops and auto parts stores, construction companies, wholesalers, as well as machinery industry companies. At 52d Siemianowicka Street s the headquarters of the road construction company and bituminous mix manufacturer Drogopol.

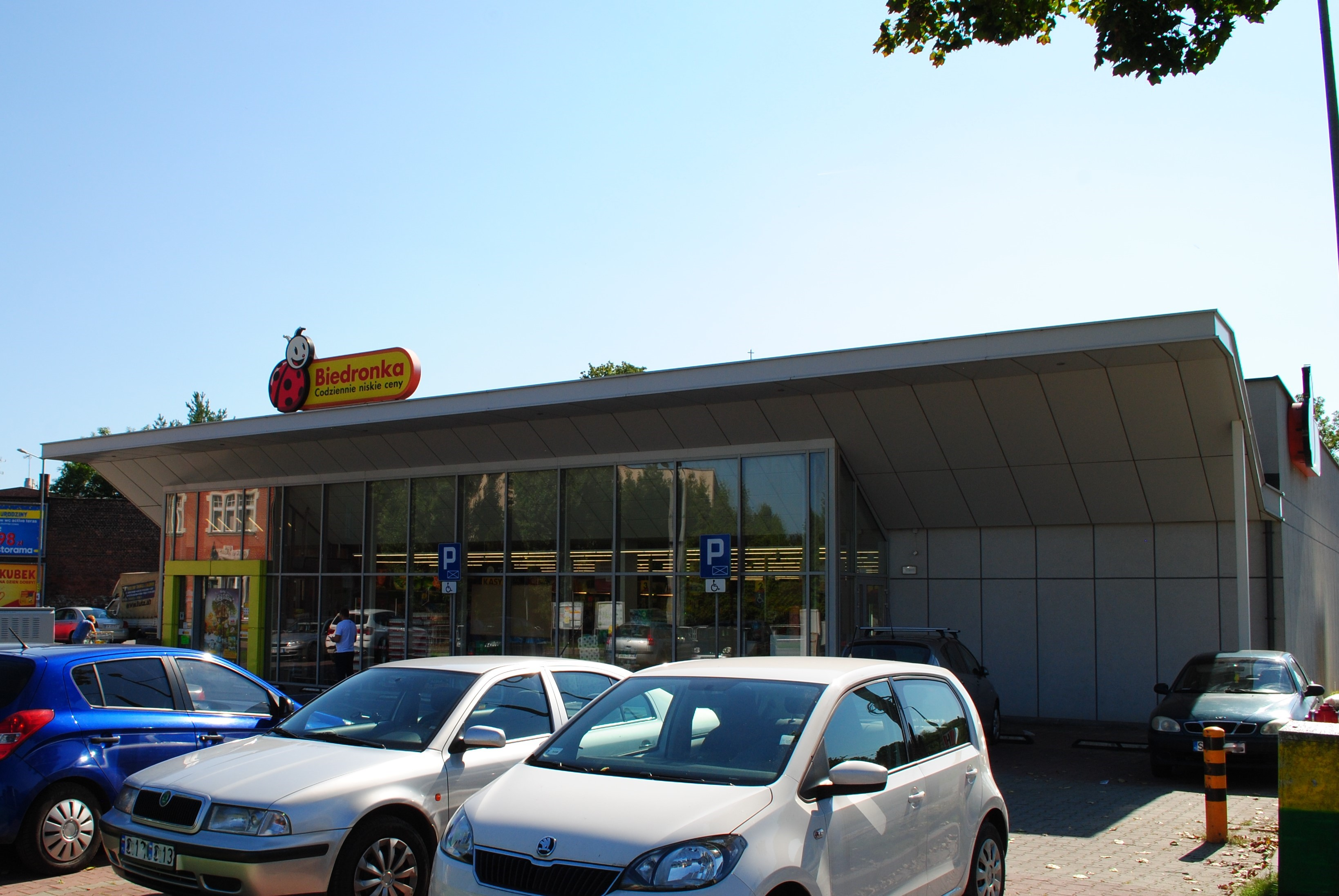
Biedronka supermarket at Henri Le Rond Street

Throughout the district, there are retail outlets representing various sectors, including the only Biedronka supermarket in Dąbrówka Mała (13 Henri Le Rond Street), built in 2008. A single local commercial and service center has developed in the district, in the area of the intersection of streets within the former, heavily transformed village: Strzelców Bytomskich Street (the section from Pod Młynem Street to J. Haller Street), J. Haller Street, Henri Le Rond Street (from J. Grzegorzek Street to the intersection with Strzelców Bytomskich Street), as well as Independence Avenue and Soldiers of September Square.

In Dąbrówka Mała, based on the actual land use, there are no areas of arable land. Based on systematic studies conducted since 1983 by the Institute of Ecology of Industrial Areas and the Center for Environmental Research and Control, an assessment of agricultural land locations was carried out according to environmental pollution criteria. Dąbrówka Mała was classified in categories B (unfavorable) and C (extremely unfavorable), indicating the need to cease food production.

== Technical infrastructure ==
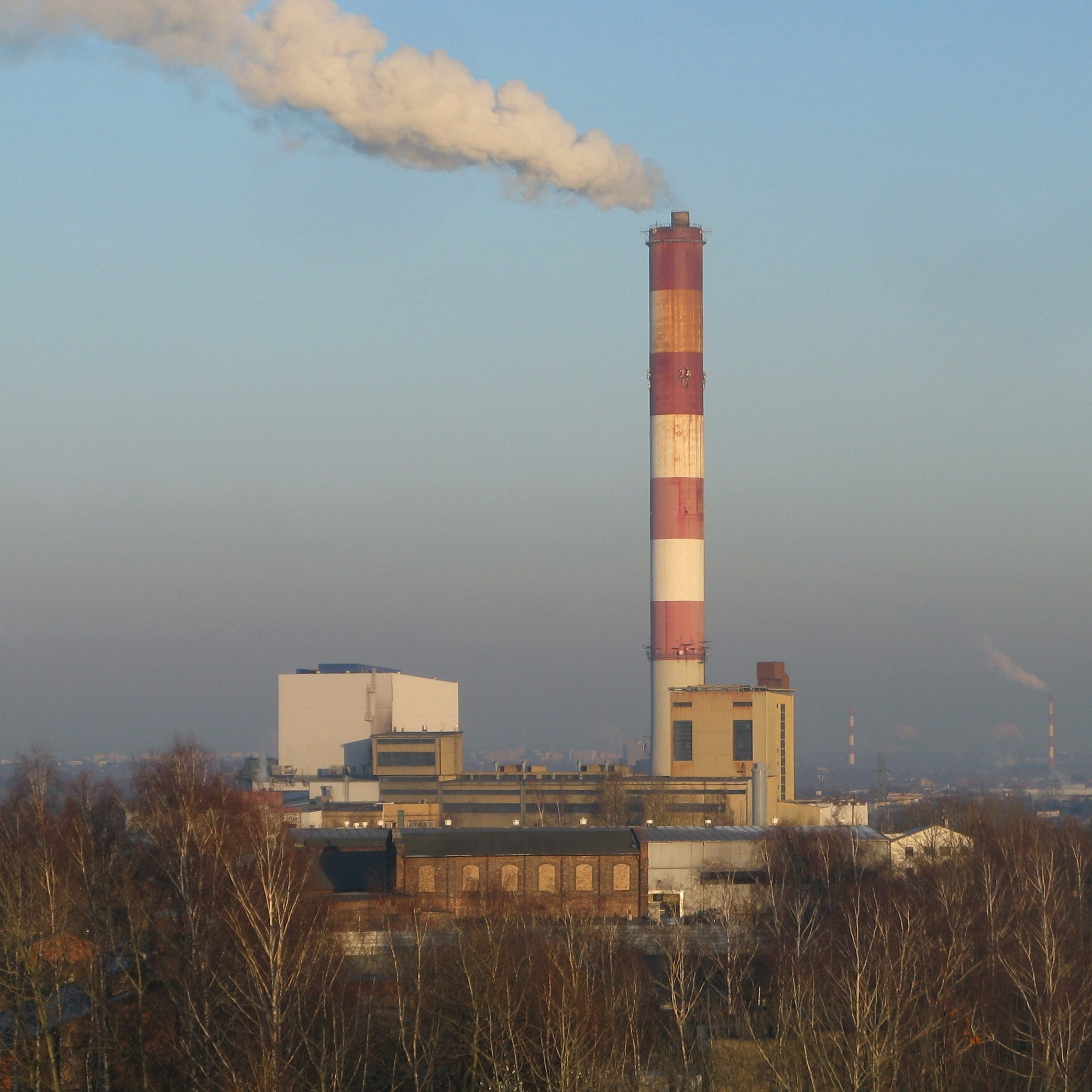
Tauron Ciepło Katowice Generation Plant (formerly Katowice Power Station) on the border of Dąbrówka Mała and Siemianowice Śląskie

There are no drinking water intakes within the district – Dąbrówka Mała, like the rest of Katowice, relies on surface water intakes from the following reservoirs: Goczałkowice Lake on the Vistula, Czanieckie Lake on the Soła, and water intakes in Dziećkowice Lake, Maczki, and Kozłowa Góra. Water from the water treatment plant is distributed via main and distribution water mains. Main water mains, managed by the Upper Silesian Waterworks Company, run through the district. There are two lines there: one runs parallel to Walenty Roździeński Avenue, while the other extends in the area of the Katowice Generation Plant (800/315 Dąbrówka Mała – Siemianowice). The municipal water supply network in Dąbrówka Mała is managed by the Water Supply Network Operations Division – Center of the Katowice Waterworks company.

In the northern part of the district, there is the MPGK Municipal Waste Collection Point and the Dąbrówka Mała-Centrum mechanical-biological-chemical wastewater treatment plant (9 Milowicka Street), owned by Katowice Waterworks. The treatment plant serves the cities of Siemianowice Śląskie, Czeladź, part of Będzin, and Milowice (a district of Sosnowiec). The plant can accept a maximum of 80,000 m³ of wastewater per day and treats an average of 20,000 m³ of wastewater per day. After treatment, the water is discharged into the Brynica.

Located on the border of Dąbrówka Mała and Siemianowice Śląskie, at 60 Siemianowicka Street, is the Katowice Power Plant operated by Tauron Ciepło (formerly the Katowice Power Station). It has an installed electrical capacity of 135 MWe and an installed thermal capacity of 459.4 MWt. It serves the cities of Katowice, Siemianowice Śląskie, Sosnowiec, and Czeladź. In 2011, it employed 286 workers. On 7 June 2002, the former Katowice Power Station was awarded the 2002 Ekolaury prize by the Polish Chamber of Ecology in the "Air Protection" category for the combined production of electricity and heat – BCF-100 unit.

The Municipal Roads and Bridges Authority's facility is located on Milowicka Street. One of its main tasks is the ongoing crushing of concrete and bituminous debris stored there, originating from the demolition of road surfaces.

== Transport ==
=== Road transport ===
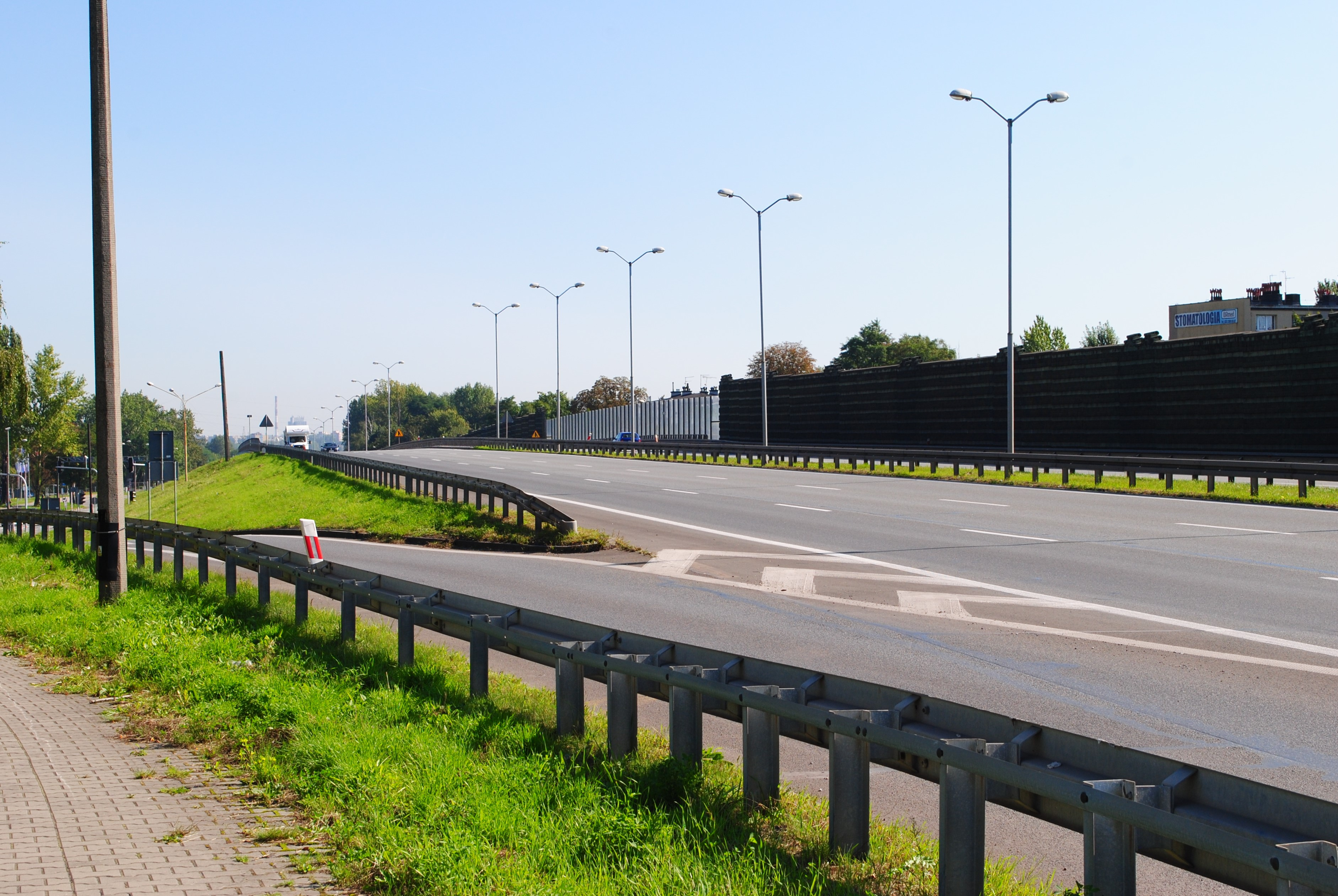
Walenty Roździeński Avenue near the railroad tracks (view toward Sosnowiec)

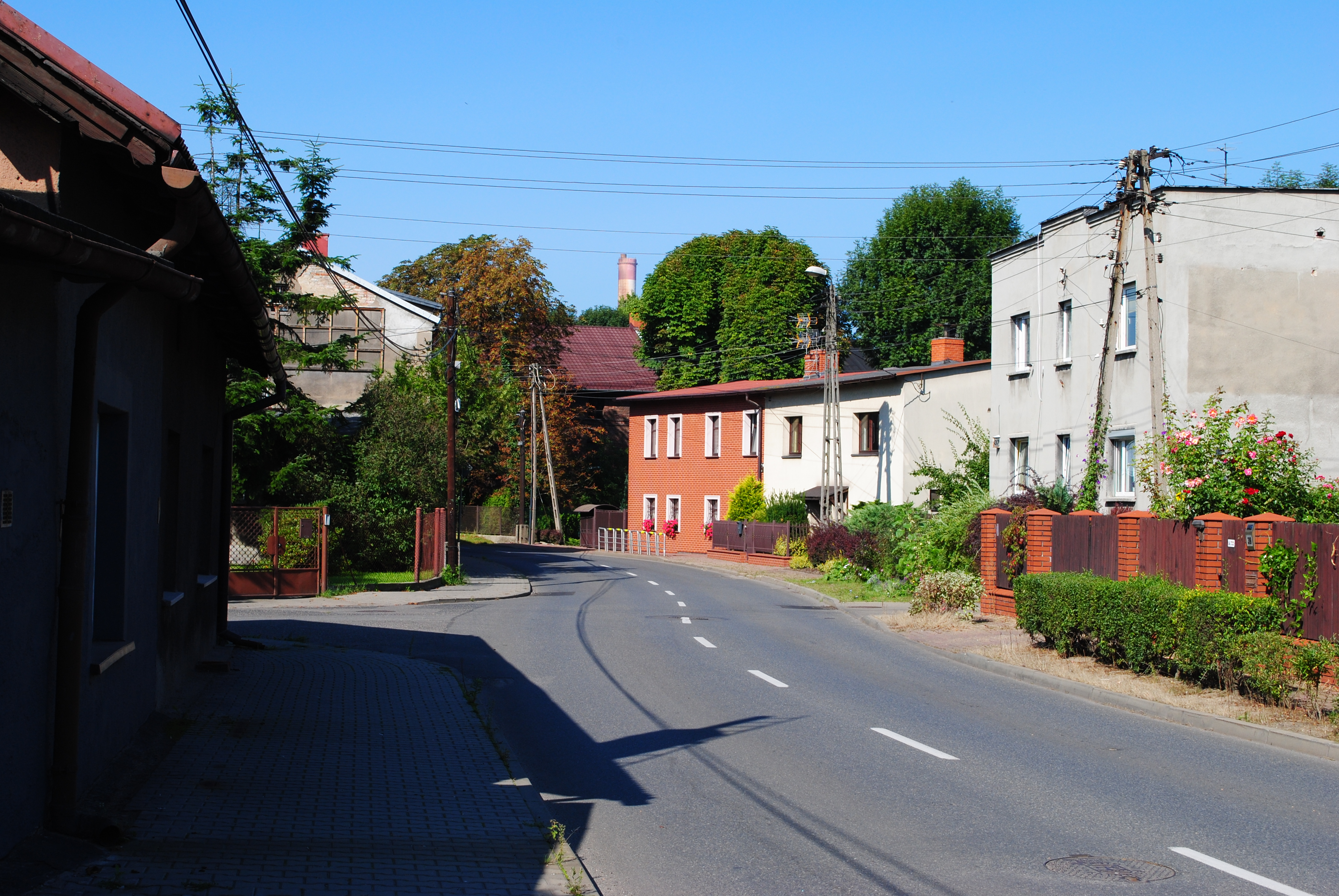
Part of Pod Młynem Street

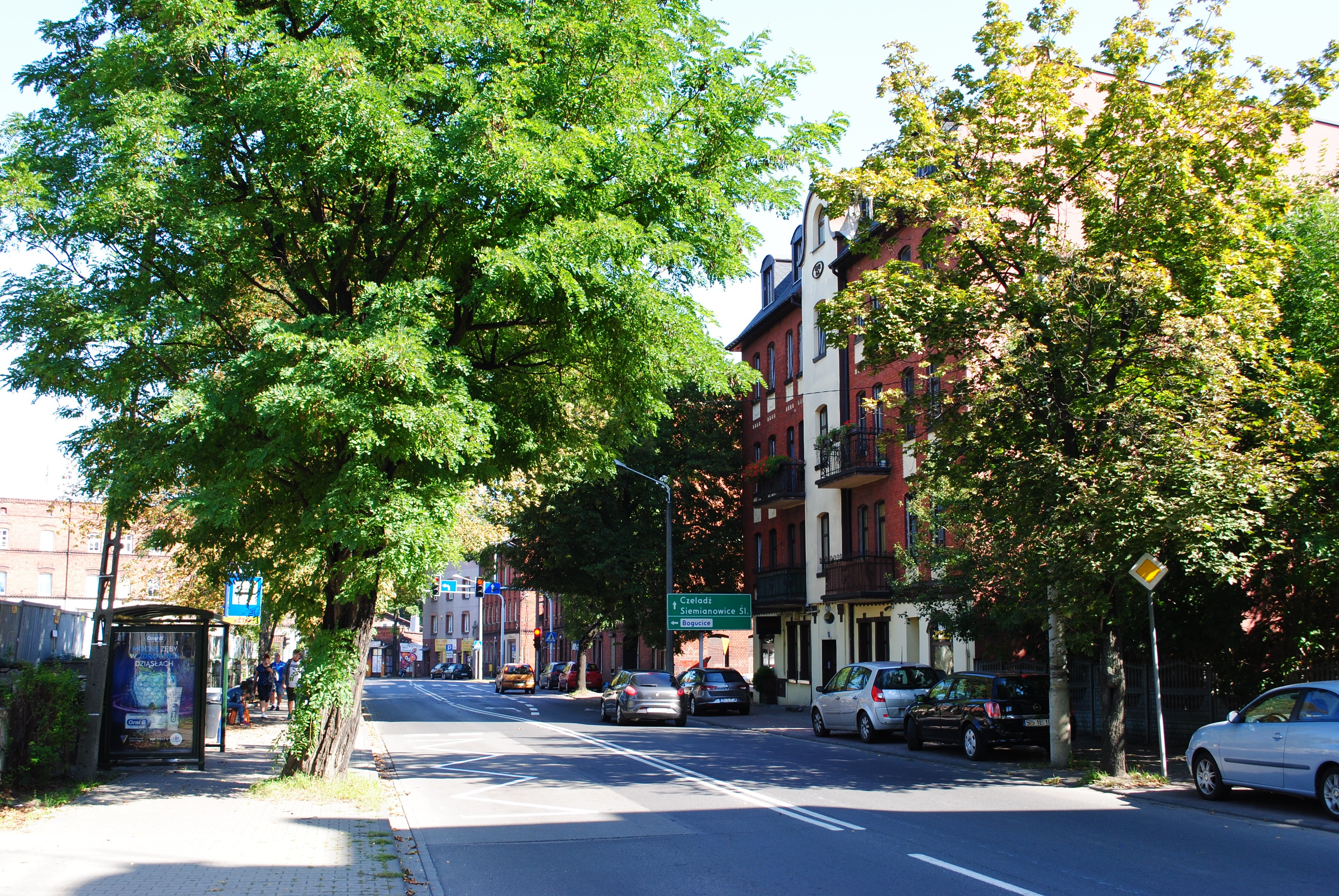
Part of Strzelców Bytomskich Street near building no. 1

The road network of Dąbrówka Mała is irregular. It consists of a system of main, distributor, and local roads. One national highway passes through the district:

- Expressway S86 (Walenty Roździeński Avenue) – a two-lane expressway from the junction with Murckowska Street to Sosnowiec. It is a continuation of national road 86 and connects to the A4 motorway southbound along Murckowska Street. It also connects Dąbrówka Mała with the expressway S1 in Tychy to the south, as well as with Sosnowiec, Będzin, and Katowice Airport to the north. It has collision-free, one-way lanes, accessible only at intersections (in Dąbrówka Mała with Szwedzka, J. Popiełuszko, Józef Haller, and Pod Młynem streets). Its main function is to facilitate rapid connections between distant areas of the city or Metropolis GZM.

In terms of the district’s internal connections with the rest of the city, as well as with expressways, the main streets play the most important role; however, due to a lack of adequate technical specifications, they are classified as distributor roads. These are the following roads:

- Józef Haller Street (connects southward at the junction with Walenty Roździeński Avenue and further south provides a connection to Szopienice-Burowiec);
- Henri Le Rond Street (a former rural road; heading west, it connects Dąbrówka Mała with Bogucice);
- Milowicka Street (heading north toward Sosnowiec and Czeladź);
- Pod Młynem Street (a road within Dąbrówka Mała; connects Strzelców Bytomskich Street with Walenty Roździeńskiego Avenue, and also provides a connection to Borki in Szopienice-Burowiec);
- Strzelców Bytomskich Street (to the north, it connects the district with Sadzawki in the Centrum district of Siemianowice Śląskie along Mysłowicka Street).

The remaining streets in Dąbrówka Mała are local and access roads that connect the various structural units within the district and provide internal access to residential areas and other facilities. Among the more important streets of this type is Independence Avenue (which is an access road).

In August 2024, a roundabout was opened at the intersection of Strzelców Bytomskich and Pod Młynem streets, which significantly improved the comfort, flow, and safety of traffic for people traveling between Katowice, Sosnowiec, Siemianowice Śląskie, and Czeladź, as well as for pedestrians.

Walenty Roździeński Avenue is one of the busiest roads in Katowice. According to a study conducted in September 2007, during the afternoon rush hour at the entrance to Katowice, 6,114 vehicles traveled along this road (including 84.9% passenger cars and 8.1% delivery vehicles), while the average traffic on Strzelców Bytomskich Street at that time was 937 vehicles (84.6% passenger cars and 9.2% delivery vehicles) and 687 vehicles on Milowicka Street (88.1% passenger cars and 7.4% delivery vehicles). In 2007, Henri Le Rond Street was identified as one of the streets where capacity was being exhausted.

=== Rail transport ===
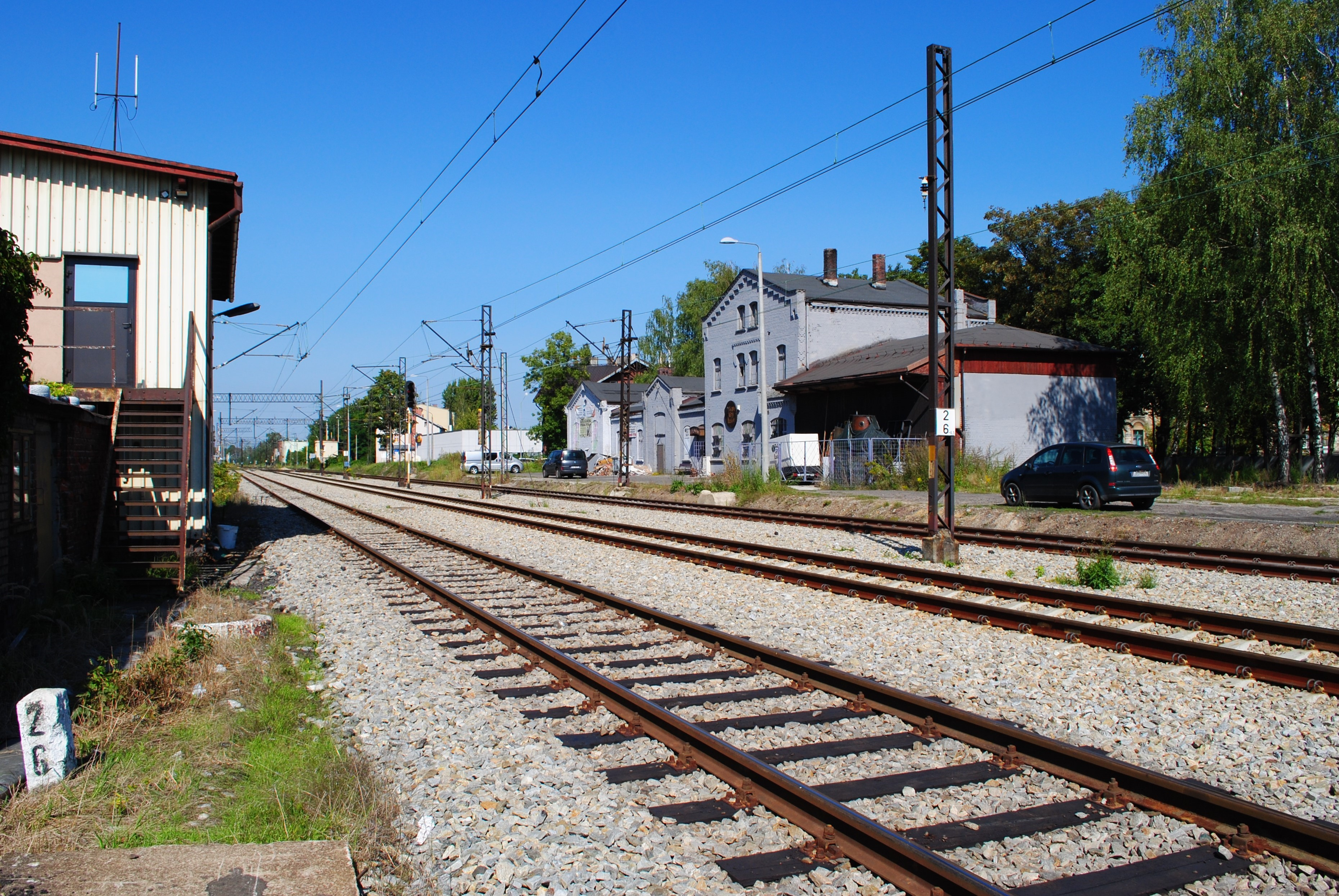
Katowice Dąbrówka Mała railway station

The railway network in Dąbrówka Mała has undergone significant changes over time. The first railway network in the district was built by the Upper Silesian Railway, which opened a siding from Katowice to the Jerzy Coal Mine on 1 November 1861.

Dąbrówka Mała gained another railway connection thanks to the Right Bank Oder Railway association, established in 1868. The association opened a railway on the section between Bytom Zachodni, Chorzów Stary, Siemianowice Śląskie, Dąbrówka Mała, and Katowice Szopienice Północne. The first trains began running on 1 February 1870. Shortly thereafter, the railway was extended to Pszczyna, providing Dąbrówka Mała with passenger and freight connections to Wrocław Nadodrze via Fosowskie in one direction and to Pszczyna in the other. A station was built alongside this railway, which was named Georggrube until 1906 (now Katowice Dąbrówka Mała). Additional sidings were also put into service, including one in 1870 between Wełnowiec and Dąbrówka Mała. The station building was constructed in the 1890s, and a waiting room and signal box were added in 1894.

This layout of the standard-gauge railway network remained in place until 1942, when a second track was built on the Katowice Szopienice Północne–Chorzów Stary railway. After World War II, further reconstruction of the railway network began. By the 1960s, the Northern Sand Main Railway had been constructed along the Brynica river and, after crossing Milowicka Street to the northwest, it ran parallel to Strzelców Bytomskich Street, along with junctions from the Shaft Ventilation II of the Kleofas Coal Mine via Wełnowiec and from Katowice Coal Mine. The first junction ran alongside the Katowice Power Station, and the second, in the Dąbrówka Mała area, extended behind the current IKEA store. Both junctions were dismantled before 2013, and the main sand line itself by 16 August of that year.

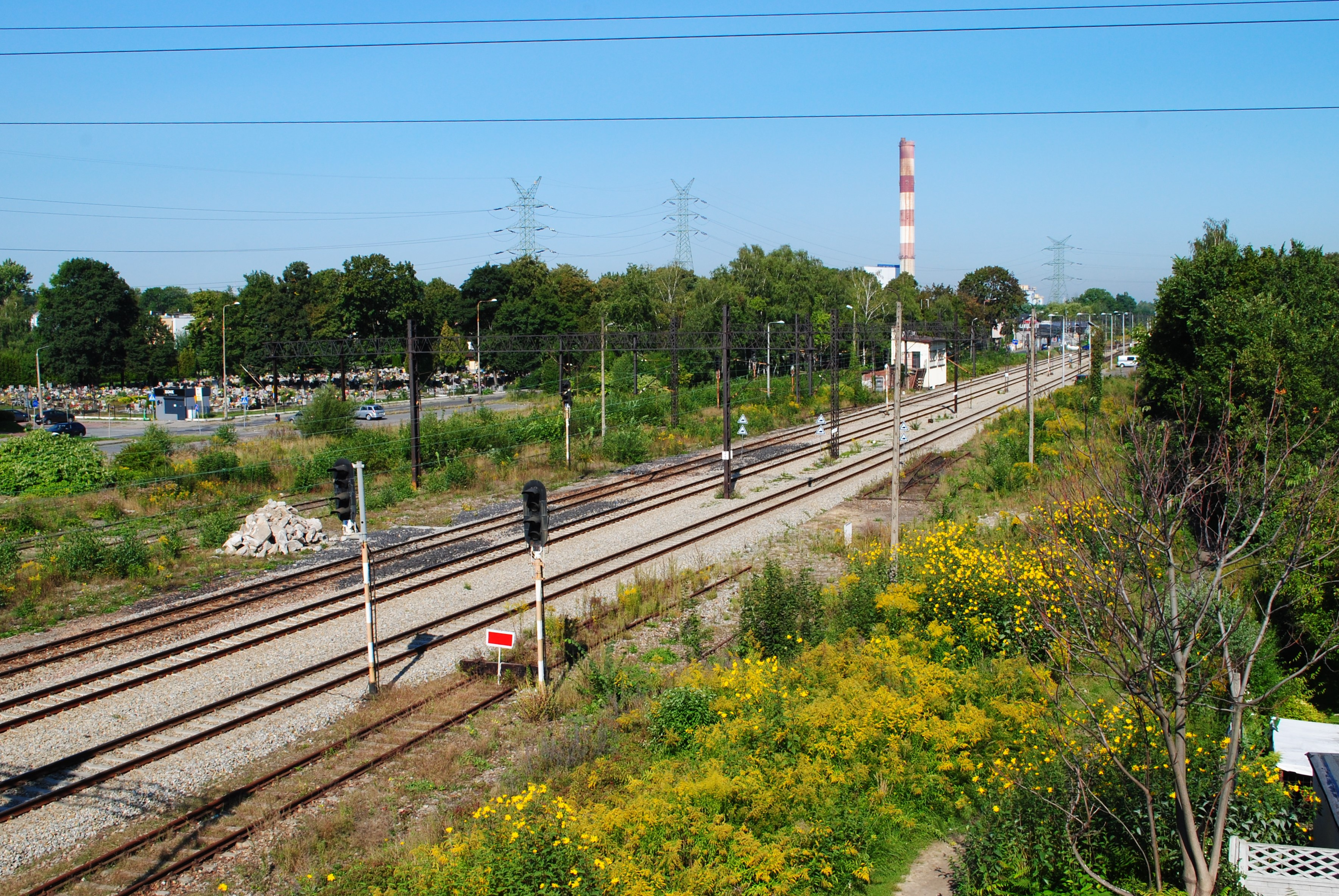
Katowice Szopienice Północne–Chorzów Stary railway as seen from the viaduct of Walenty Roździeński Avenue

In the postwar years, passenger trains ceased to run through Dąbrówka Mała. Passenger service was suspended on 1 April 1968. In 1976, the junction between Zawodzie and Dąbrówka Mała was dismantled. On 25 April 1990, the main railway was electrified.

A narrow-gauge sand railway with a track gauge of 785 mm also ran through Dąbrówka Mała, parallel to Milowicka Street and toward Siemianowice Śląskie. The route connected the sand pit with the Giesche Coal Mine in Janów (now the Wieczorek Coal Mine). On 15 July 1924, the Giesche company submitted an application for a permit to build the narrow-gauge railway. Construction began after the permit was granted on 15 May 1925. The railway was put into service on 15 May 1928, and that same year, extraction began at the sandpit located by the Brynica. Two years later, the railway was electrified. In 1954, the sand pit was closed due to the depletion of its deposits, and the narrow-gauge railway was dismantled along with it.

Currently, the only active railway passing through Dąbrówka Mała is Katowice Szopienice Północne–Chorzów Stary railway, which is operated by PKP Polish Railway Lines. Only freight traffic runs on it. The former Katowice Dąbrówka Mała railway station is now a technical station.

=== Public transport ===
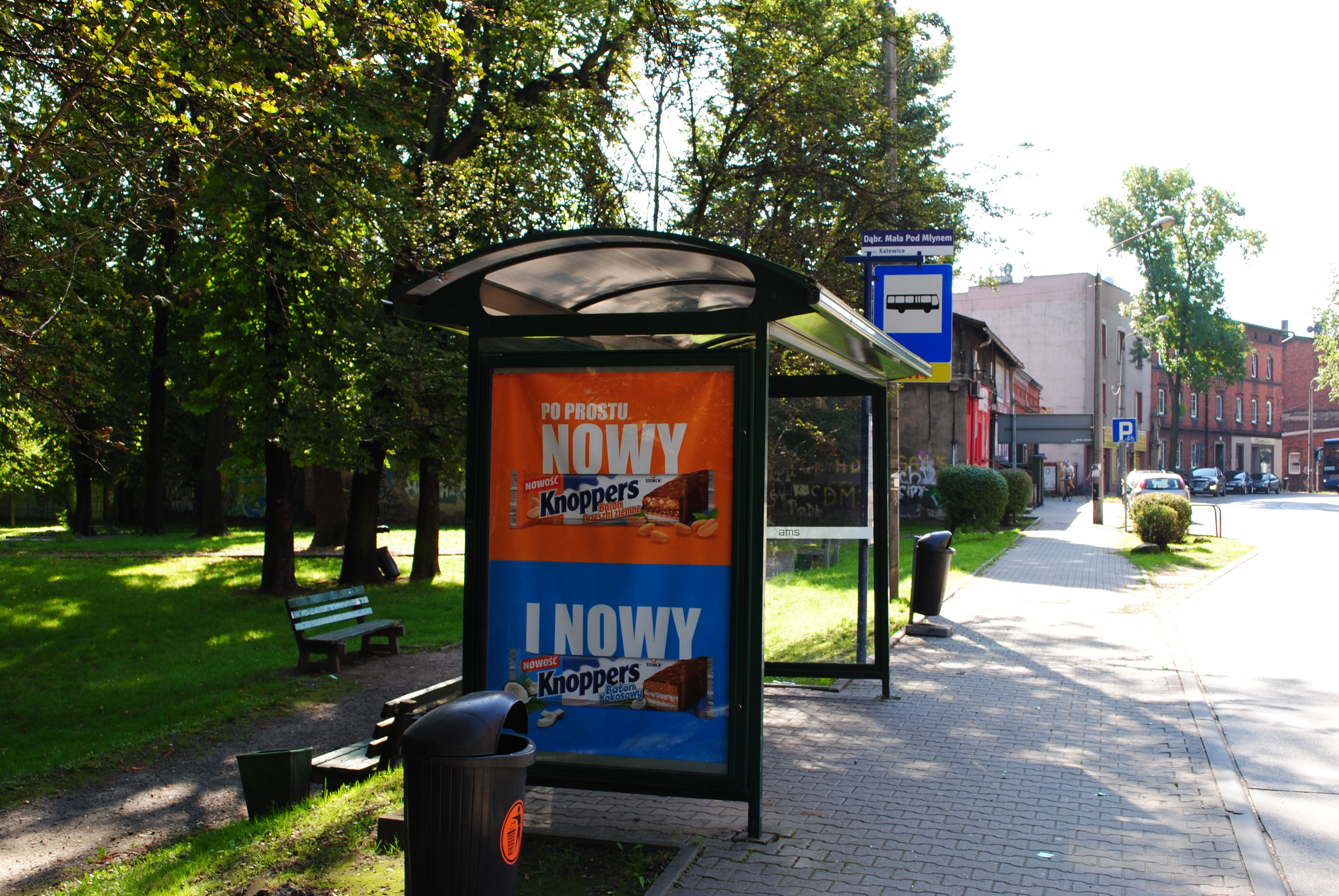
Dąbrówka Mała Pod Młynem bus stop near the park in Dąbrówka

Public transportation within Dąbrówka Mała, as well as to other districts of Katowice and neighboring cities, is provided by buses operated by the Metropolitan Transport Authority. They run on all main and distributor roads in the district, with Walenty Roździeński Avenue being as the main bus route. Along this avenue, within the boundaries and in the vicinity of Dąbrówka Mała, there are four bus stops: Dąbrówka Mała Centrum Handlowe, Dąbrówka Mała Skrzyżowanie, Dąbrówka Mała Nowosam, and Dąbrówka Mała Pawilon Agata (the latter serving only buses heading toward the center of Katowice). Of these, as of September 2020, 14 bus lines depart from the Dąbrówka Mała Intersection stop (toward downtown Katowice), including one night line, and 16 lines depart toward Sosnowiec, including one night line. From this stop, intercity buses connect Dąbrówka Mała mainly with the cities of the Dąbrowa Basin (Będzin, Czeladź, Dąbrowa Górnicza, and Sosnowiec), as well as with Ruda Śląska (the districts of Kochłowice and Halemba). For intra-city service, buses from this stop connect Dąbrówka Mała directly with, among others, Śródmieście, Brynów, Ligota-Panewniki, Bogucice, and Osiedle Witosa.

Nine bus lines, including two night routes, depart from the Dąbrówka Mała Ośrodek Zdrowia bus stop, located in the center of the district. These lines provide direct connections from Dąbrówka Mała mainly to destinations within the city (including Śródmieście, Bogucice, Brynów, Piotrowice, Dąb, Koszutka, Szopienice-Burowiec, Nikiszowiec, Giszowiec, Osiedle Tysiąclecia, Osiedle Witosa, and Panewniki), and provide intercity connections to Będzin, Czeladź, and Ruda Śląska. Additionally, routes running through Dąbrówka Mała head toward Siemianowice Śląskie along Budowlana and Strzelców Bytomskich streets, as well as individual routes to Chorzów and Bytom.

=== Bicycle infrastructure ===
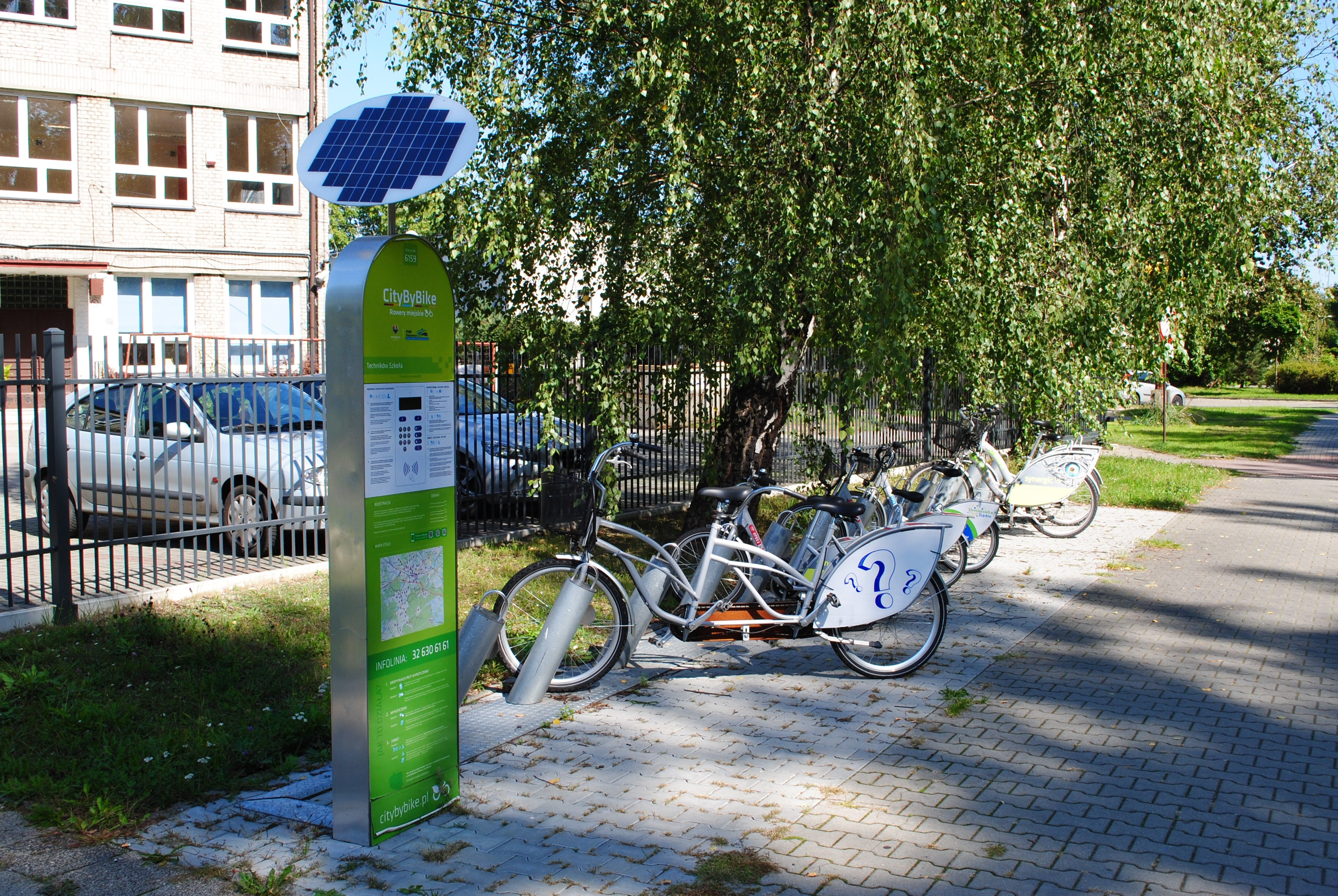
City by bike municipal bicycle station on Techników Street

In Dąbrówka Mała, the network of bicycle paths is underdeveloped. Until 2020, the only dedicated path was an asphalt route running parallel to Techników Street, on its south side. The Metrorower bike-sharing station No. 27183 is located there. As of March 2024, two stations were also located on Henri Le Rond Street (nos. 27178 and 27639). According to the planned bicycle path network published by the City of Katowice, this route is to head east toward J. Popiełuszko Street, Walenty Roździeński Avenue, and J. Haller Street, and from there further south to Szopienice-Burowiec. The route is intended to serve a transport function. There are also no tourist bicycle routes running through the district.

== Architecture ==
=== Urban development ===
Dąbrówka Mała experienced rapid urban development in the mid-18th and 19th centuries. At that time, the town’s buildings were concentrated along Pod Młynem, Siemianowicka, and Strzelców Bytomskich streets. Buildings were also constructed along the northern side of Henri Le Rond Street, between the cemetery and Styczniowa Street. he oldest existing structures began to be constructed in the mid-1850s. The oldest buildings in Dąbrówka Mała include, among others, the houses at 17 Styczniowa Street, 1 Henri Le Rond Street (from around 1840), 8, 28 (from 1873), 44, 63–65 (buildings of the former Maria ventilation shaft from between 1905 and 1910; the area of the historic Georg Colony), 69, 73 (completed in the late 19th century), 82 (built around 1870), and 92 (part of the buildings dates from between 1830 and 1840), 1 Wiertnicza Street, 33 and 44 Strzelców Bytomskich Street, 2 Pod Młynem Street (from 1879), and 17 P. Dytrych Street, as well as the complex of buildings along 5 and 10–28 J. Grzegorzek Street from 1890.

Selected buildings in Dąbrówka Mała built before 1922

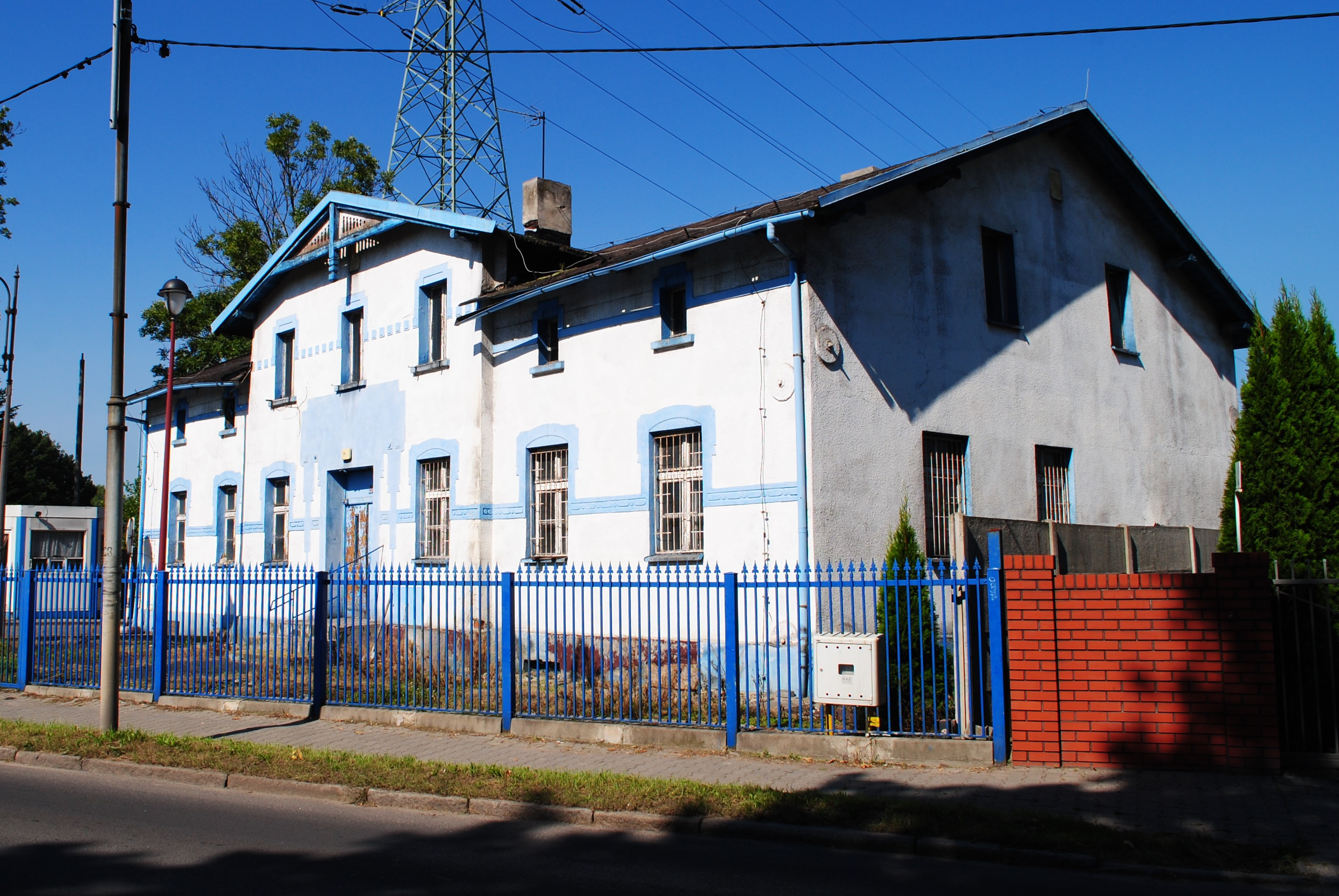
House at 28 Henri Le Rond Street, built in 1873

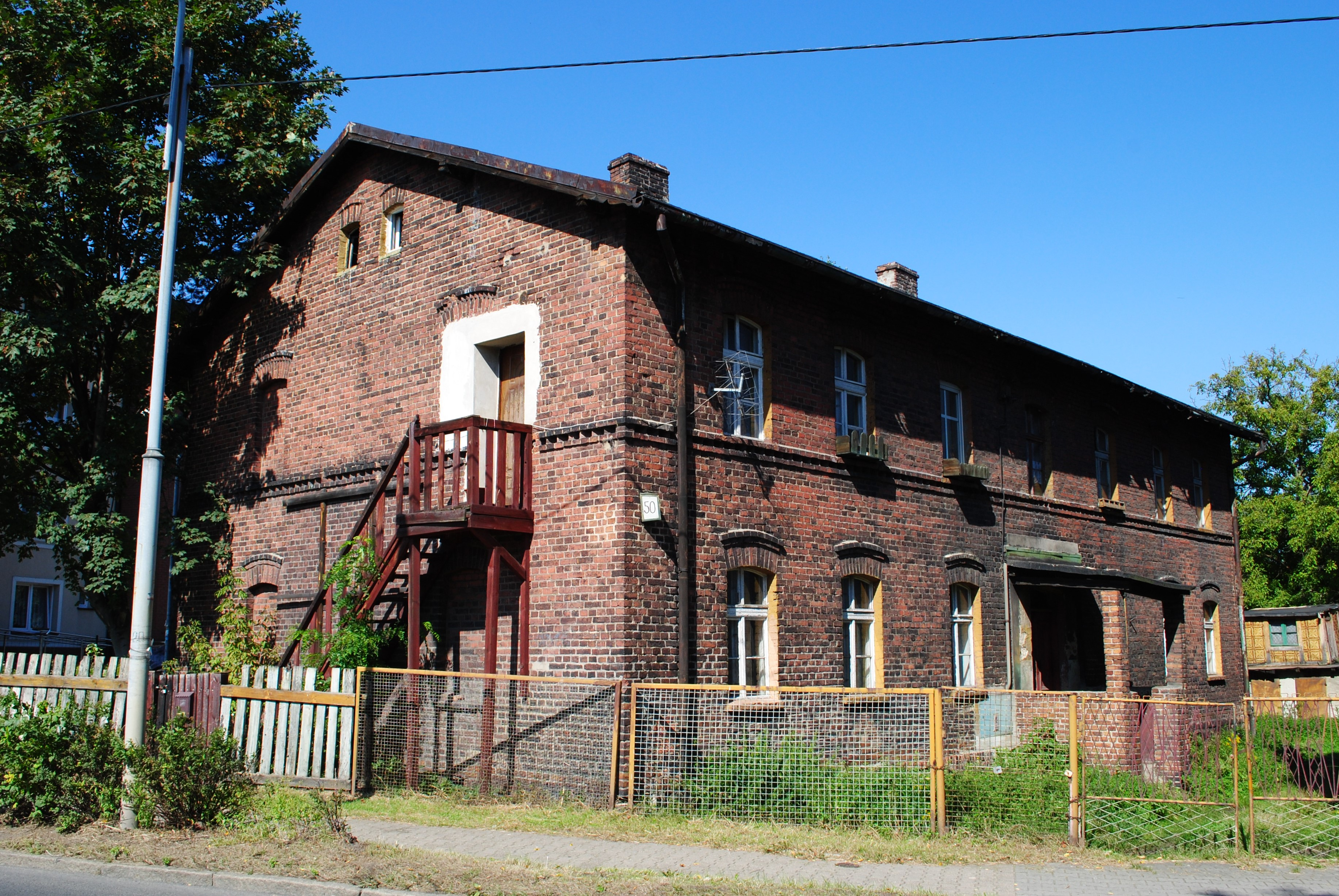
Familok at 50 Henri Le Rond Street

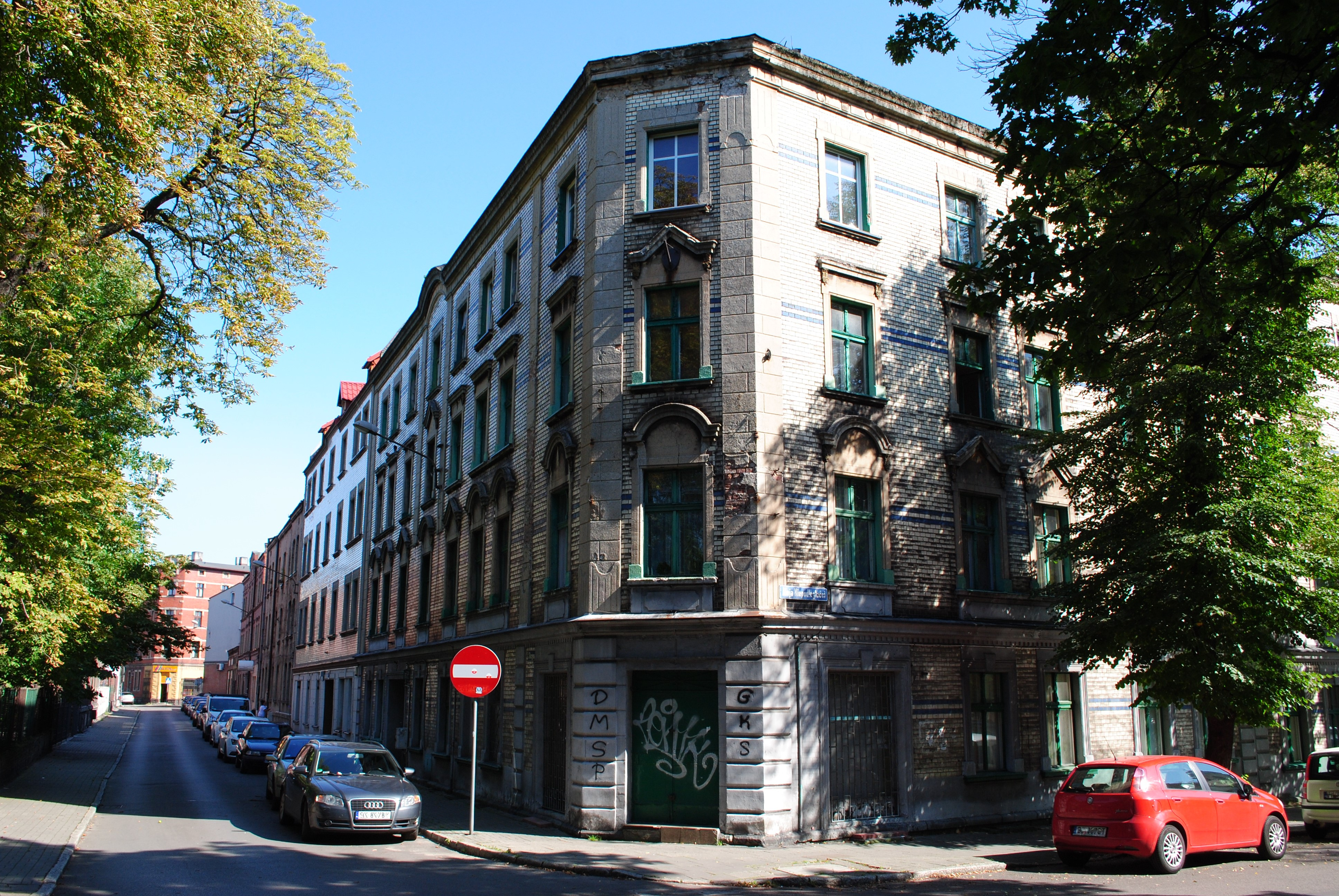
Apartment buildings at the corner of Stacyjna Street and Independence Avenue

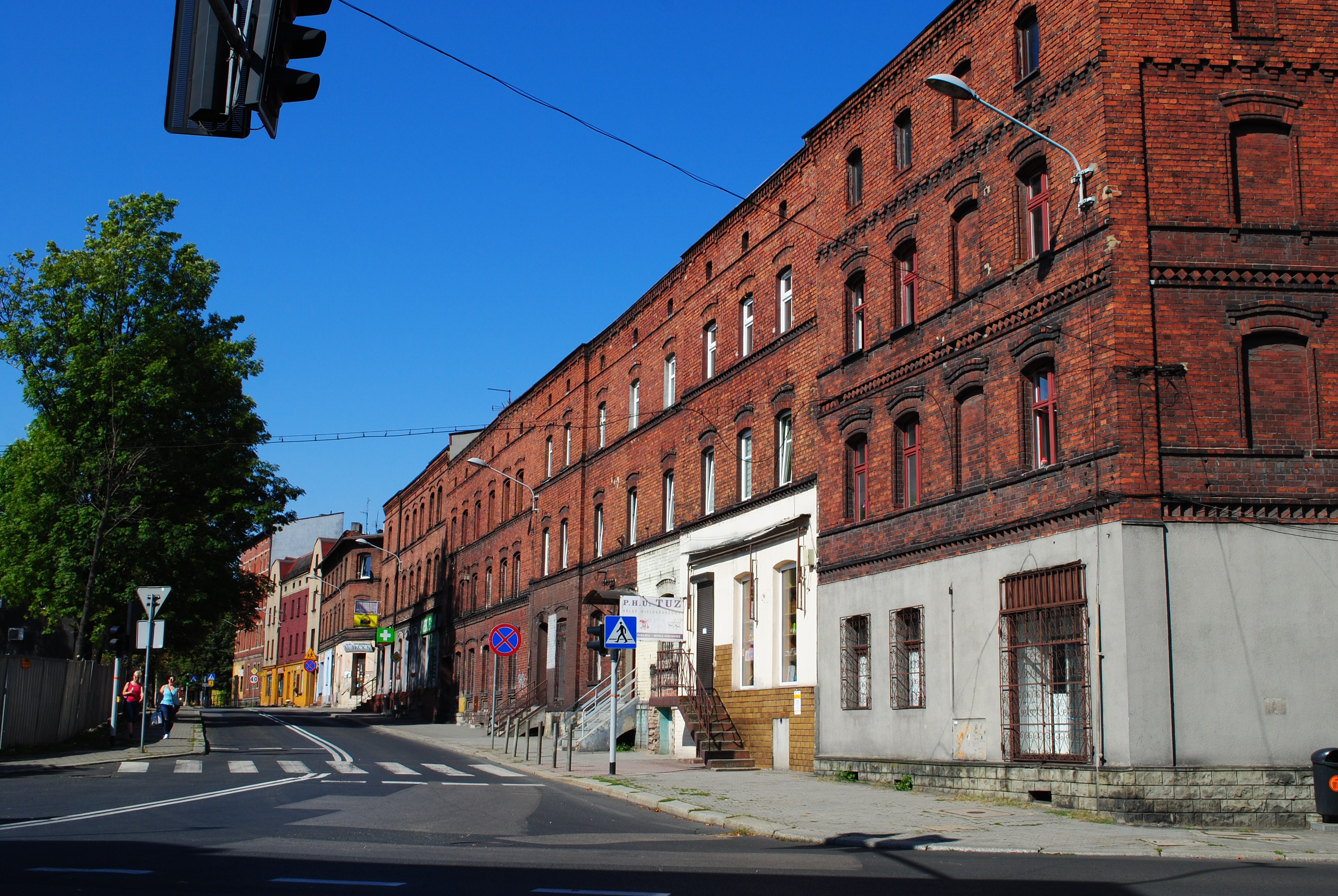
Apartment buildings at Henri Le Rond Street

By the time Dąbrówka Mała was incorporated into Poland in 1922, a significant portion of the district's buildings had already been constructed, concentrated in the area of Henri Le Rond Street (western and eastern parts), Strzelców Bytomskich Street, Independence Avenue, Stacyjna Street, and the intersection of Pod Młynem and P. Dytrych streets. By that time, the town hall, a church, the railway station, and a folwark had also been built. In the interwar years, aside from individual structures (including the tenement at 5 Independence Avenue, which houses the post office, and the buildings at 1, 2, and 16 Strzelców Bytomskich Street), several complexes of semi-detached and row houses were built. During this period, a row house housing estate was built in 1921 in the area of 23, 25, and 27 J. Grzegorzek Street, a colony of semi-detached houses at Styczniowa Street in 1928, and a complex of houses along 23–61 Henri Le Rond Street in the 1920s and 1930s.

Selected buildings in Dąbrówka Mała built in the interwar years

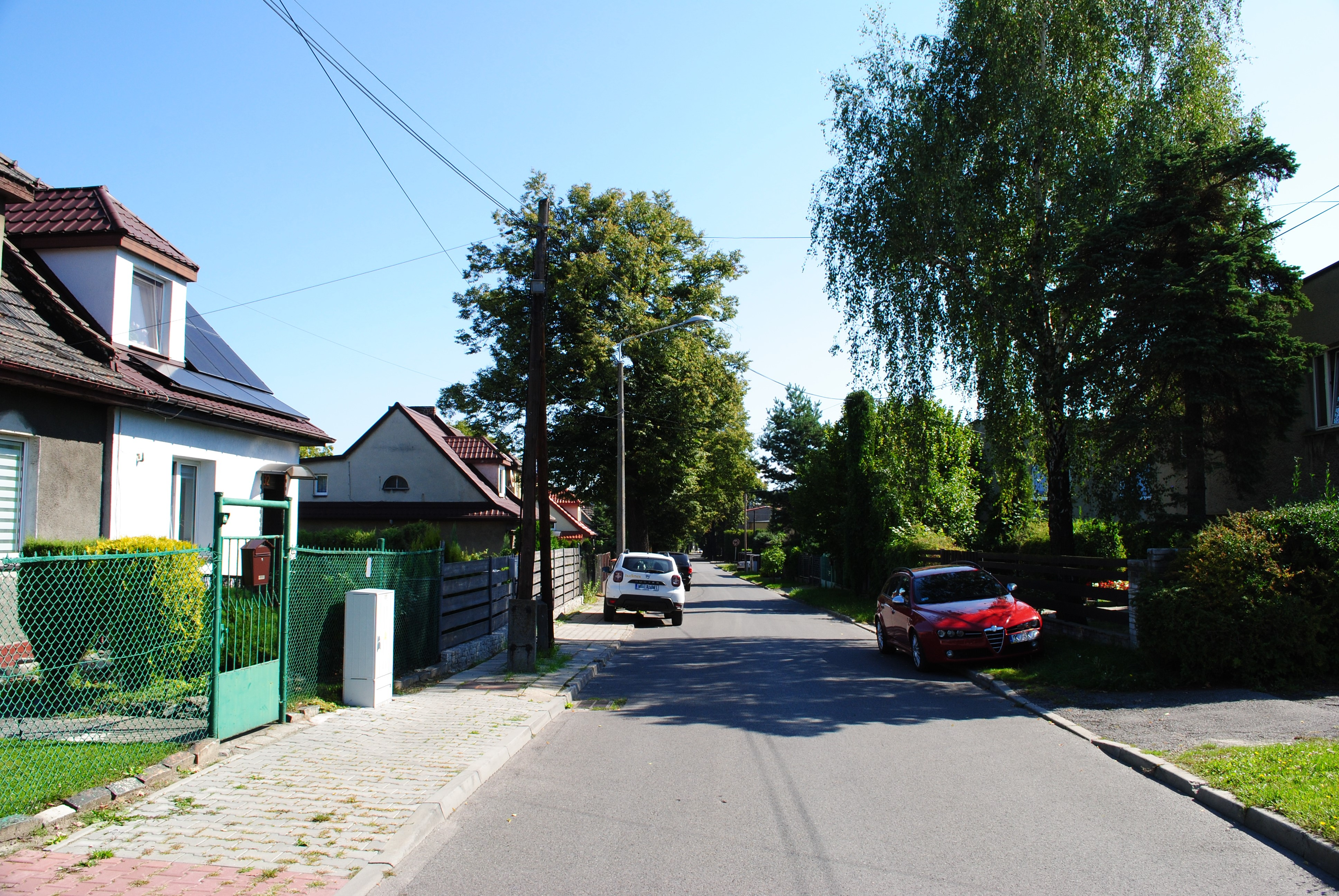
Section of the colony at Styczniowa Street from between 1925 and 1928

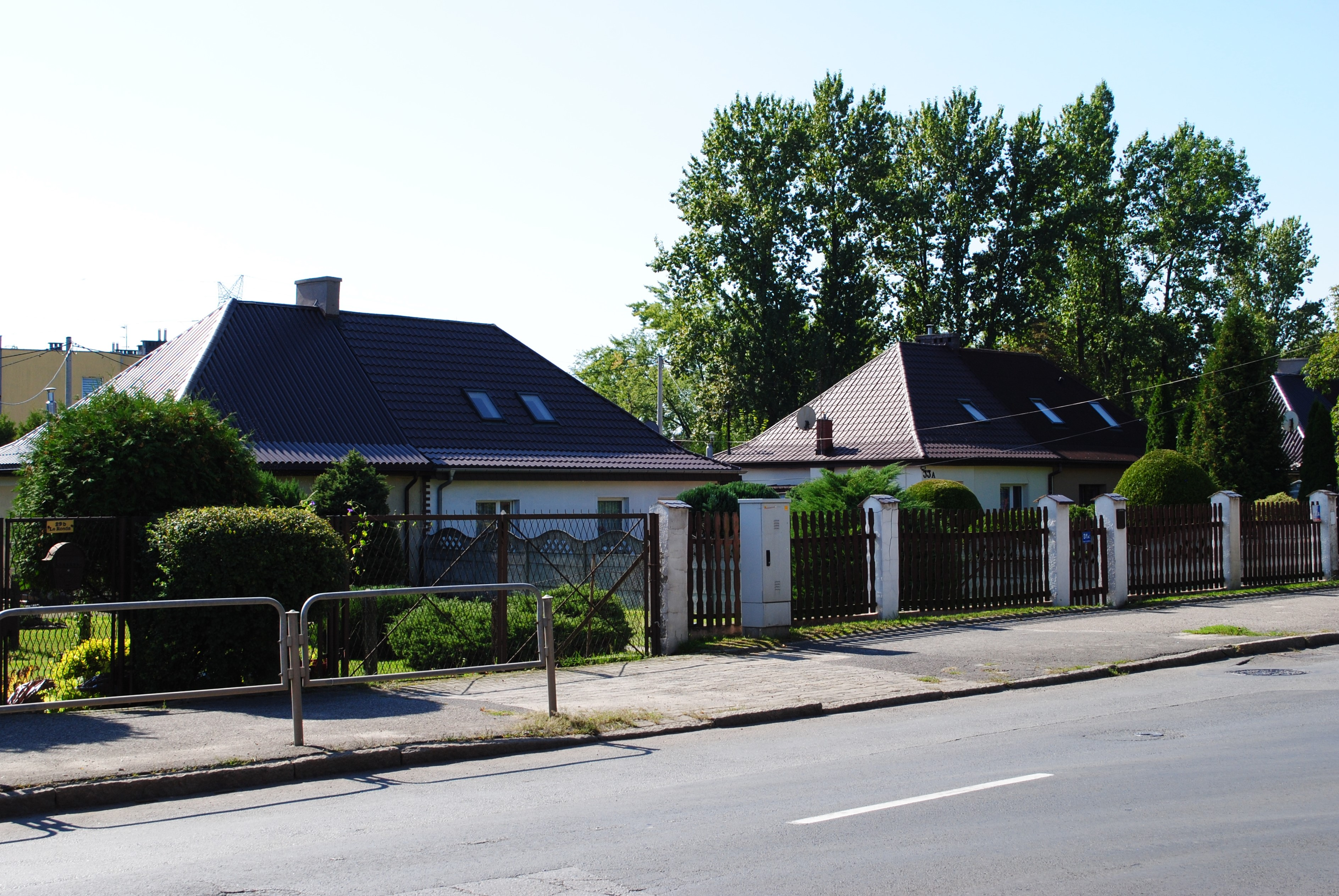
Section of the housing estate at 23–61 Henri Le Rond Street

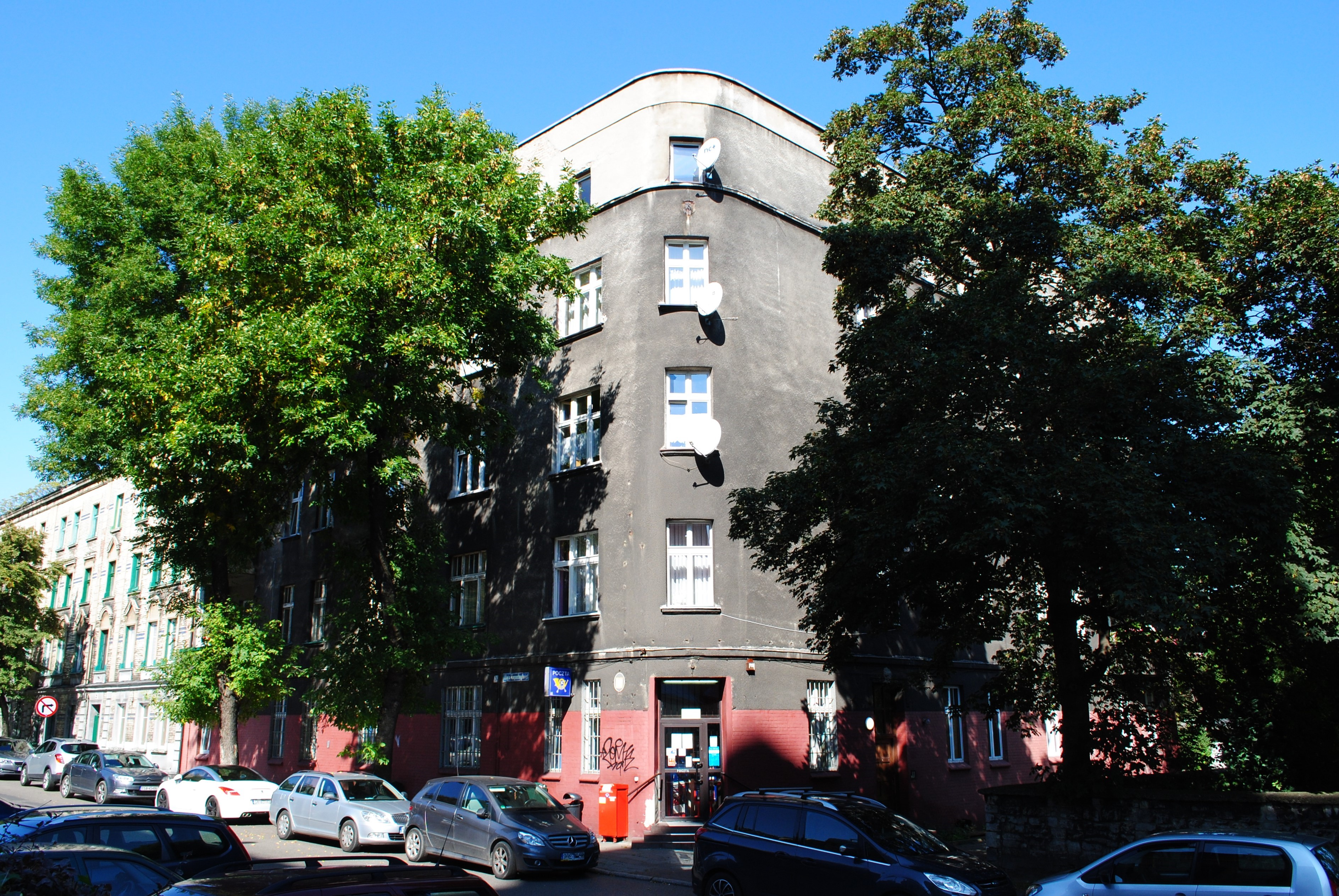
Apartment building at 5 Independence Avenue from 1931

Between 1945 and 1989, the district underwent further expansion. Both single-family homes and residential complexes were built, especially from the 1970s onward. During that time, a row house estate on J. Biniszkiewicz Street, apartment buildings on Wiertnicza Street, and school complexes on Techników Street were built, among other projects. In 1978, Osiedle Konstantego Michalskiego was built in the area of J. Grzegorzek and Strzelców Bytomskich streets, consisting of 11-story large-panel-system buildings.

After 1989, the development of Dąbrówka Mała continued to intensify. In 1994, a new school complex at 4 J. Grzegorzek Street was opened; in 1997, a shopping mall at 191 Walenty Roździeński Avenue; in 2000, an IKEA store; and by that time, other individual buildings had also been constructed. Between 2005 and 2007, new apartment buildings were completed, some of which were converted from former dormitories built in 1969 near Techników Street. In the same area, four two-story apartment buildings were completed by the end of 2008, and another one in early 2012. Earlier, in 2009, construction was completed on a housing estate of 37 townhouses at 50–54 Styczniowa Street. In May 2014, the so-called "Manor Houses", located at 3, 5, 7, and 9 Strzelców Bytomskich Street and built in the 1880s, were demolished. According to data from 2007, the proportion of developed land in the entire district was 22%, and the weighted average number of stories was 1.68 at that time.

Buildings built in the postwar years

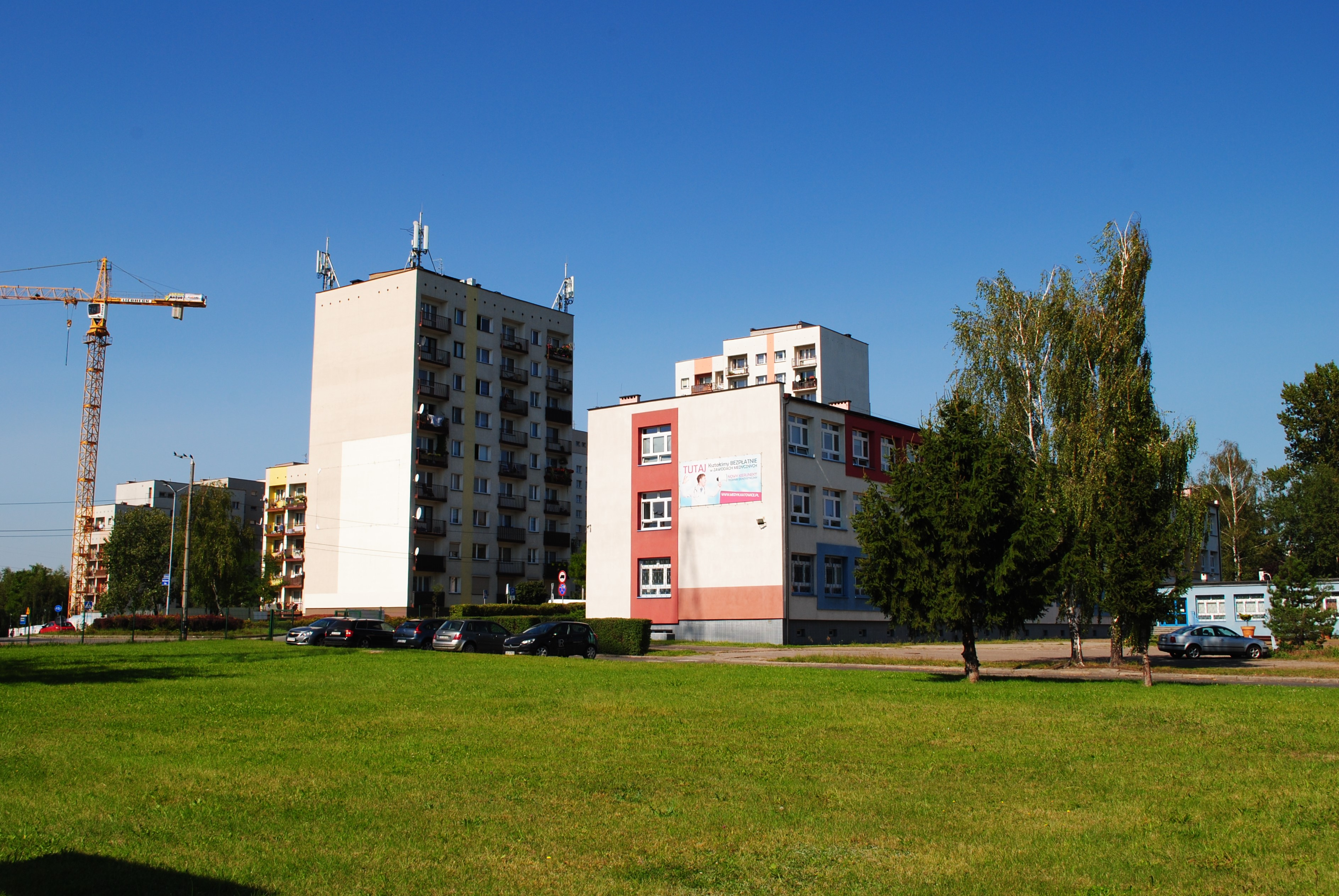
Residential buildings at Wiertnicza Street – Norma housing estate

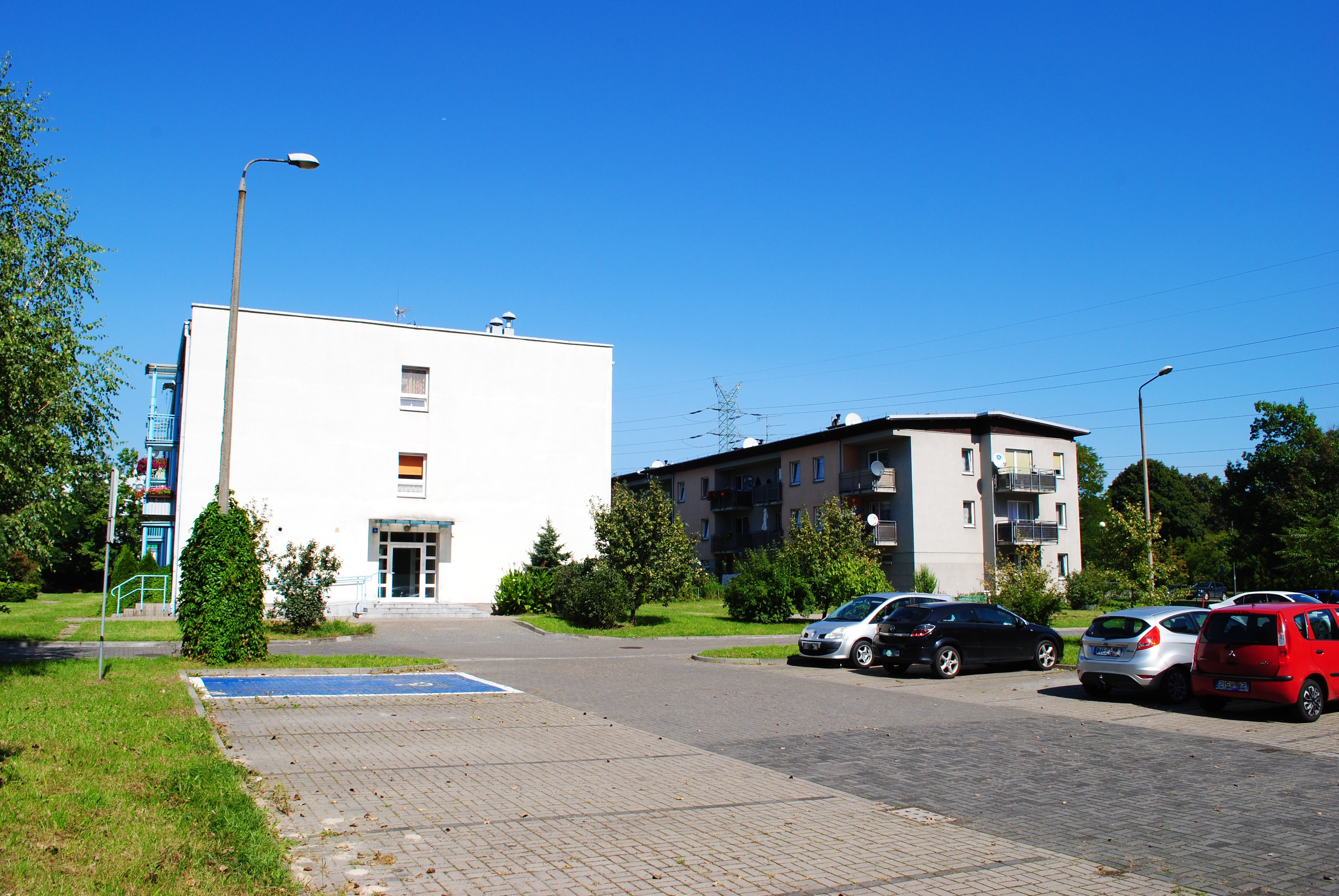
Residential buildings at 13–15 Techników Street

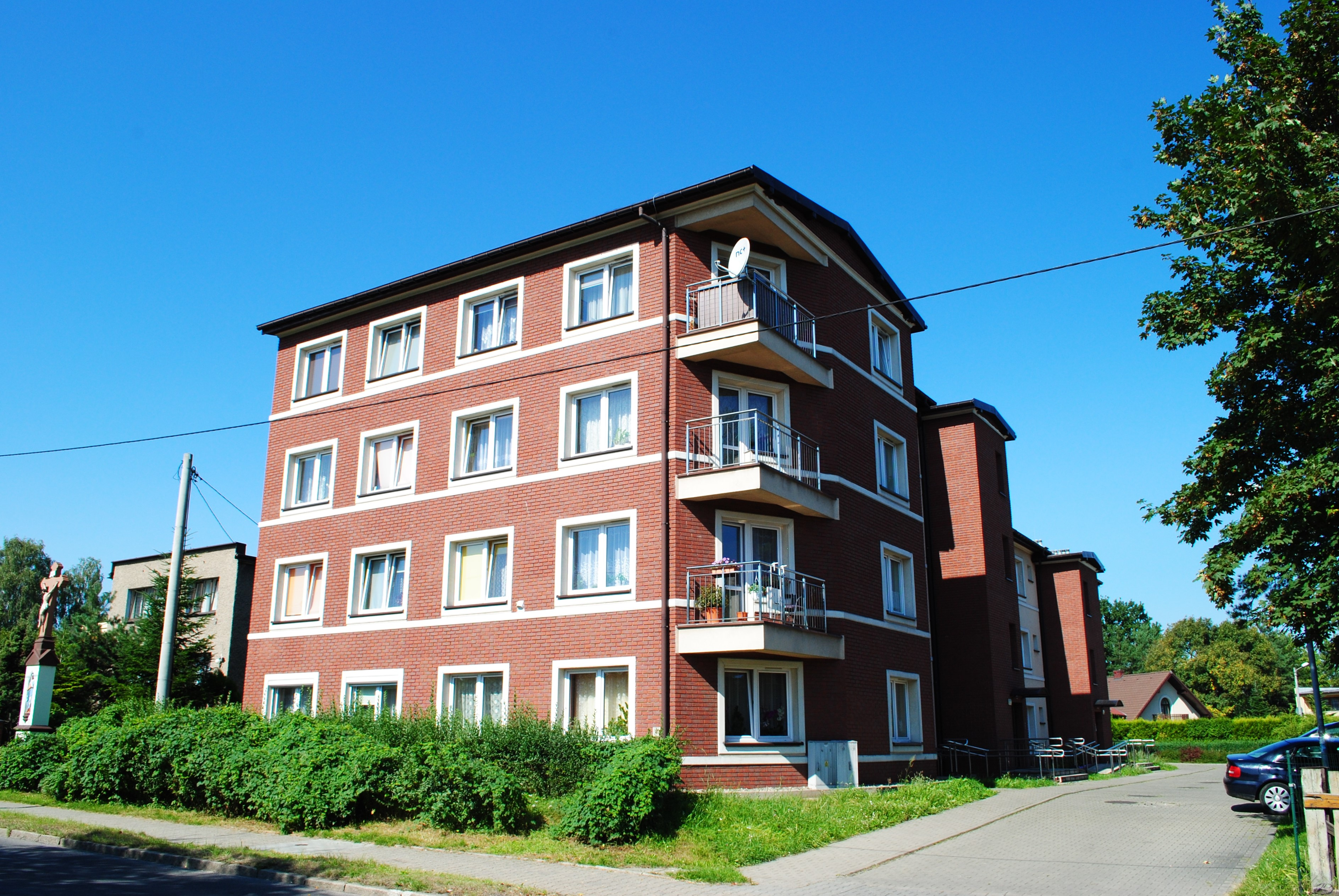
Building at 52 Henri Le Rond Street from 2012

=== Historic buildings ===
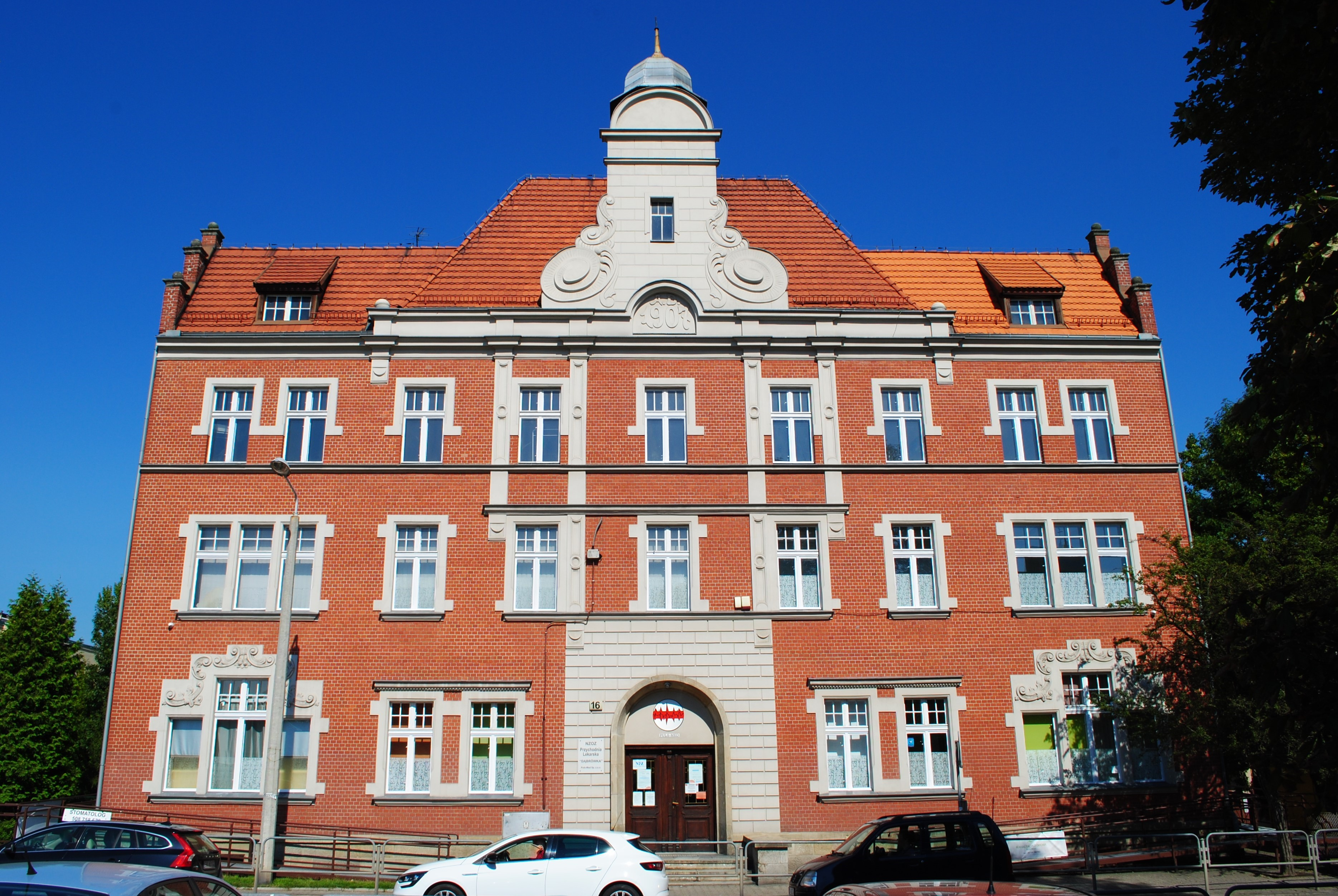
Former Gmina Dąbrówka Mała town hall at 16 Henri Le Rond Street

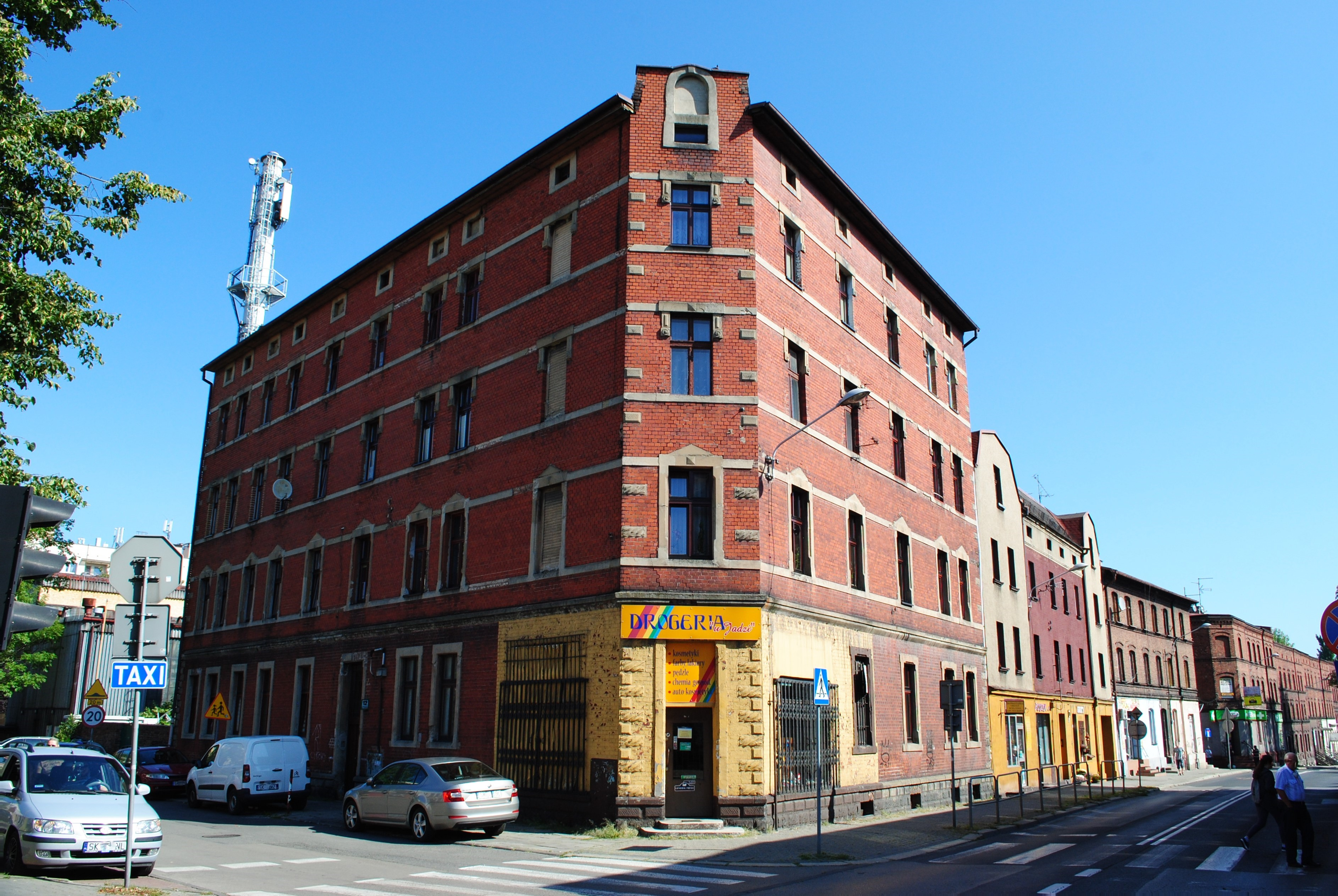
Tenements on Henri Le Rond Street

Dąbrówka Mała is one of the districts requiring protection and revitalization of its historical spatial structure, including existing historic buildings and complexes, as well as legally protected green areas. The area is home to old tenements (on Henri Le Rond, Strzelców Bytomskich, Independence Avenue streets), familoks (Siemianowicka Street), the Volunteer Fire Department building (former headquarters of the Society of Fighters for Freedom and Democracy), the old railway station building (currently housing the Gry i Ludzie Theatre), the former Capitol Theater building, and the kindergarten in the former manor park. In 1990, a 19th-century wooden dovecote, previously located in Dąbrówka Mała at 12 P. Dytrych Street, was transferred to the Upper Silesian Ethnographic Park in Chorzów.

The following buildings in Dąbrówka Mała are listed in the Register of Cultural Property:

- Church of St. Anthony of Padua – Baroque Revival, built between 1907 and 1912 (A/531/2019 of 30 December 1994);
- Former Gmina Dąbrówka Mała town hall from 1907 (currently a health center; A/43/00 of 11 December 2000);
- Complex of a former manor house from the last decade of the 19th century – one of the buildings dating from 1853 (1–2 Żyzna Street; A/1562/94 of 30 December 1994);
- Kindergarten at 72 Józef Haller Street, erected in 1937 (A/1234/23 of 28 July 2023).

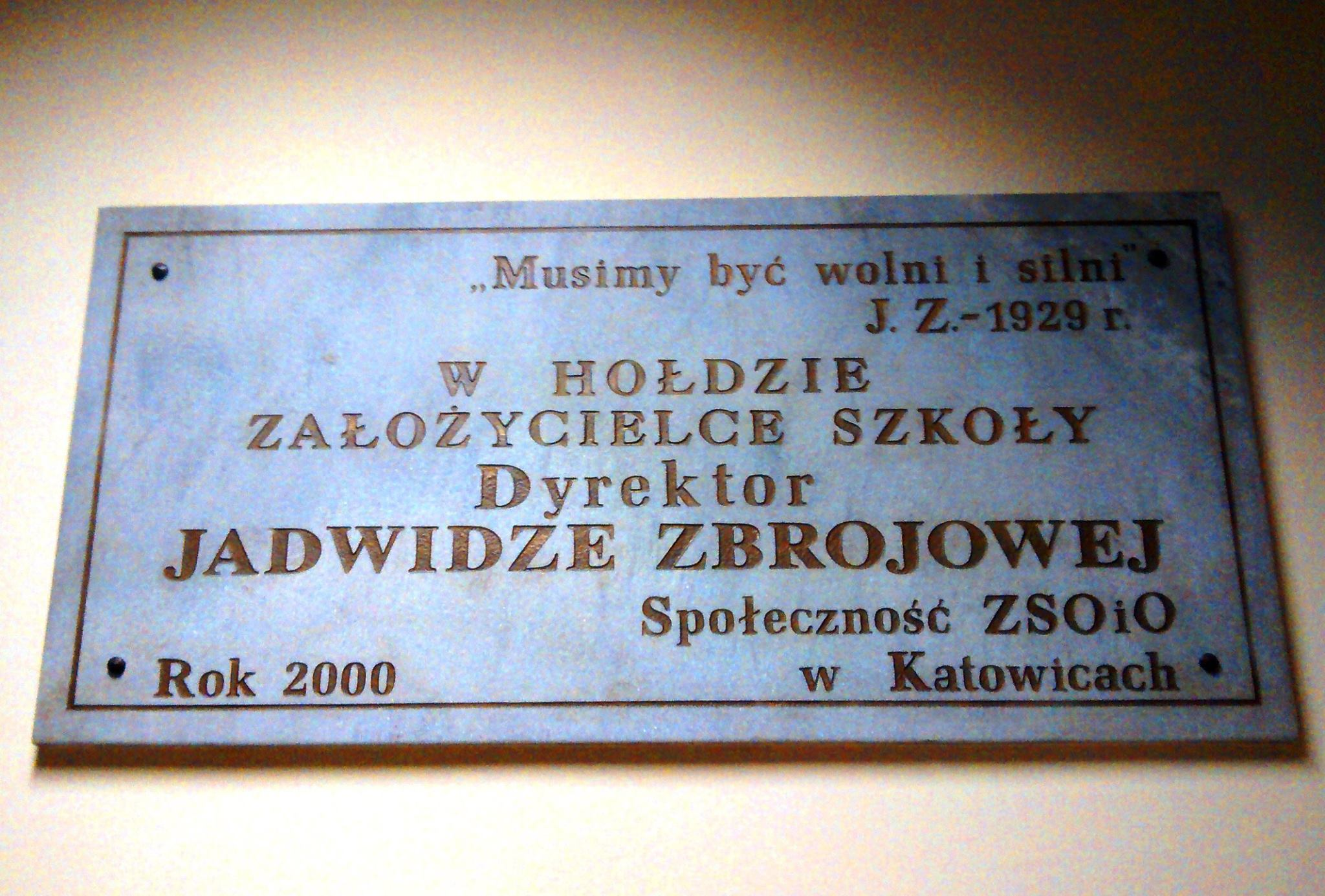
Plaque commemorating Jadwiga Zbrojowa

=== Monuments and places of national remembrance ===
- Plaque commemorating the citizens of Dąbrówka Mała who died during World War I and the struggle for Polish independence (in the Church of St. Anthony of Padua);
- Monument commemorating former Silesian insurgents and distinguished citizens of Dąbrówka Mała who died in prisons and death camps during World War II and were executed in 1940 (unveiled in 1960 in the manor park; currently Soldiers of September Square);
- Mass war grave of seven unknown German soldiers who died during World War II, located in the parish cemetery;
- Mass war grave of residents of Dąbrówka Mała who died during the Silesian Uprisings and fighting in World War II, located in the parish cemetery;
- Mass war grave of prisoners from the Auschwitz subcamp murdered during transport in January 1945, located in the parish cemetery;
- Memorial wall dedicated to Zofia Kossak-Szczucka (located in the Zofia Kossak-Szczucka School Complex for Fashion and General Education);
- Plaques in the parish church, commemorating the parsons: Wawrzyniec Pucher, Maksymilian Wojtas, and Stefan Kwieciński;
- Plaque commemorating the Wanda Singing Society, founded in 1912 (on the wall of a tenement at 56 Henri Le Rond Street);
- Plaque dedicated to Jadwiga Zbrojowa, the founder of Katowice’s first vocational school for girls from working-class families (unveiled in 2001 on the building of the Clothing and General Education School Complex).

== Sights ==
Landmarks of Dąbrówka Mała include the Saint Anthony church and the former Dąbrówka Mała Gmina Office (now a healthcare center). There are two parks in the district: Park w Dąbrówce and Park Zielony Zakątek. At Plac Żołnierzy Września, the district's main square, there is a monument dedicated to Poles massacred by the Germans in Dąbrówka Mała on April 3–4, 1940.

== Culture ==
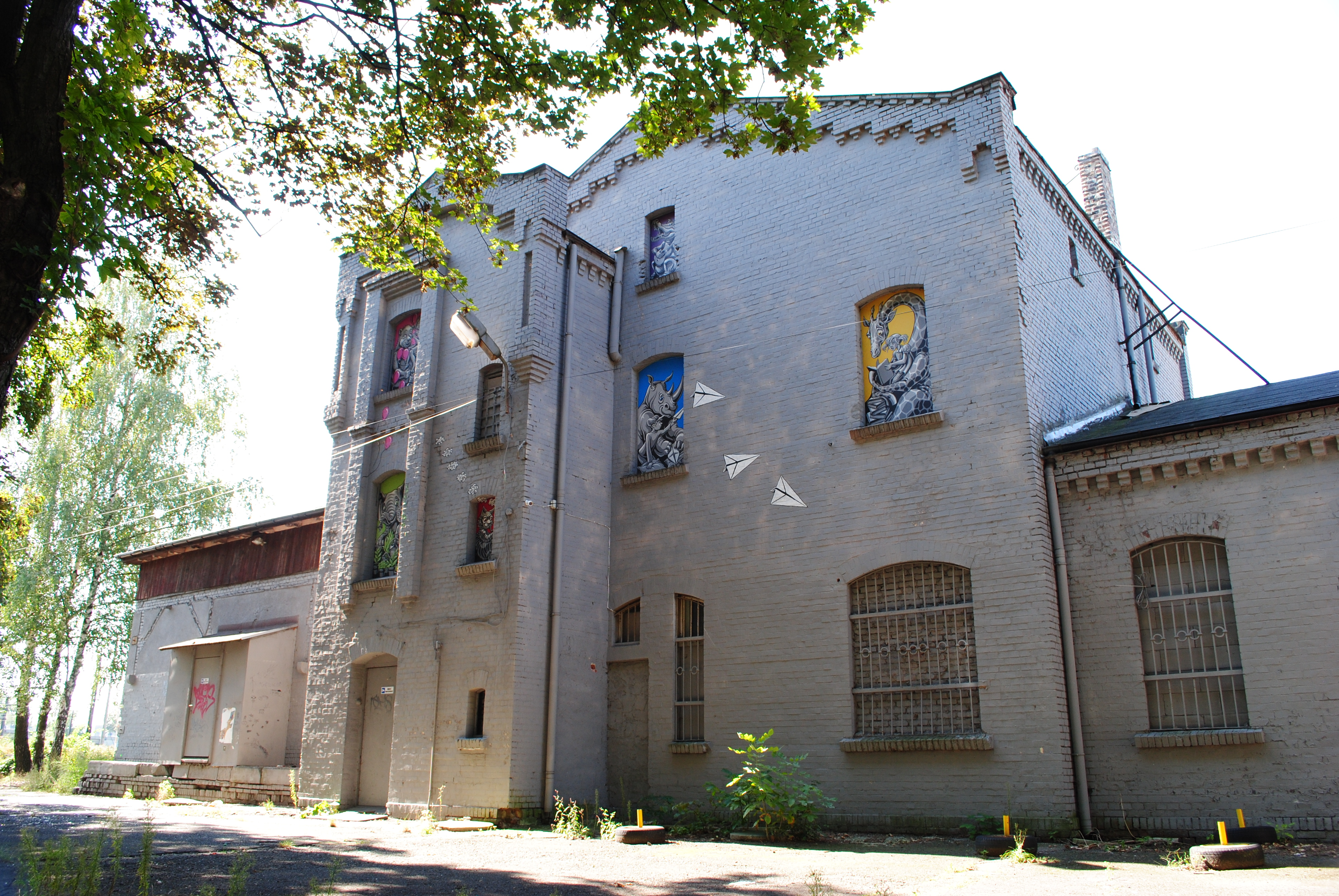
Headquarters of the Gry i Ludzie Theatre in the building of the former Katowice Dąbrówka Mała railway station

The first Polish performance in present-day Katowice took place in Dąbrówka Mała in 1882. It was Dzwonek Św. Jadwigi by Karol Miarka, staged in the garden of the innkeeper Hamburger. In 1891, a play by Jan Aleksander Fredro, Consilium facultatis, was performed in the garden of Weissenberg's inn, with members of the Catholic Casino from Roździeń. There were also artistic societies and Polish mothers' circles there, as well as the Wanda Choir, founded in 1912 by Jan Płonka, which had 55 members.

After World War II, in 1952, construction was completed on the People's House, which housed the Company Cultural Center. The building was constructed by the Szopienice Zinc Smelter. At the same time, the Capitol Cinema opened at present-day 71 J. Haller Street.

The district hosts cultural events, such as the annual U Antonika festival (funds raised during the event are donated to charity) and concerts by the Camerata Silesia ensemble. Until the early 1990s, the second stage of the Ateneum Puppet Theatre also operated there.

Branch No. 20 of the Katowice Municipal Public Library is located in Dąbrówka Mała, at 21b Strzelców Bytomskich Street. In addition to a library and a reading room, it hosts library lessons, meetings with interesting people as part of "Thursday at the Library", and organizes regular events. The building of the former Katowice Dąbrówka Mała railway station houses the headquarters of the Gry i Ludzie Theatre. Founded in 1997, it mainly stages outdoor and street performances, as well as indoor shows for children and adults. The theater has been using its current headquarters since 2003. A branch of the Catholic Youth Association operates at the parish church, organizing Christmas gatherings, festivals, competitions, joint retreats, and youth trips.

== Education ==
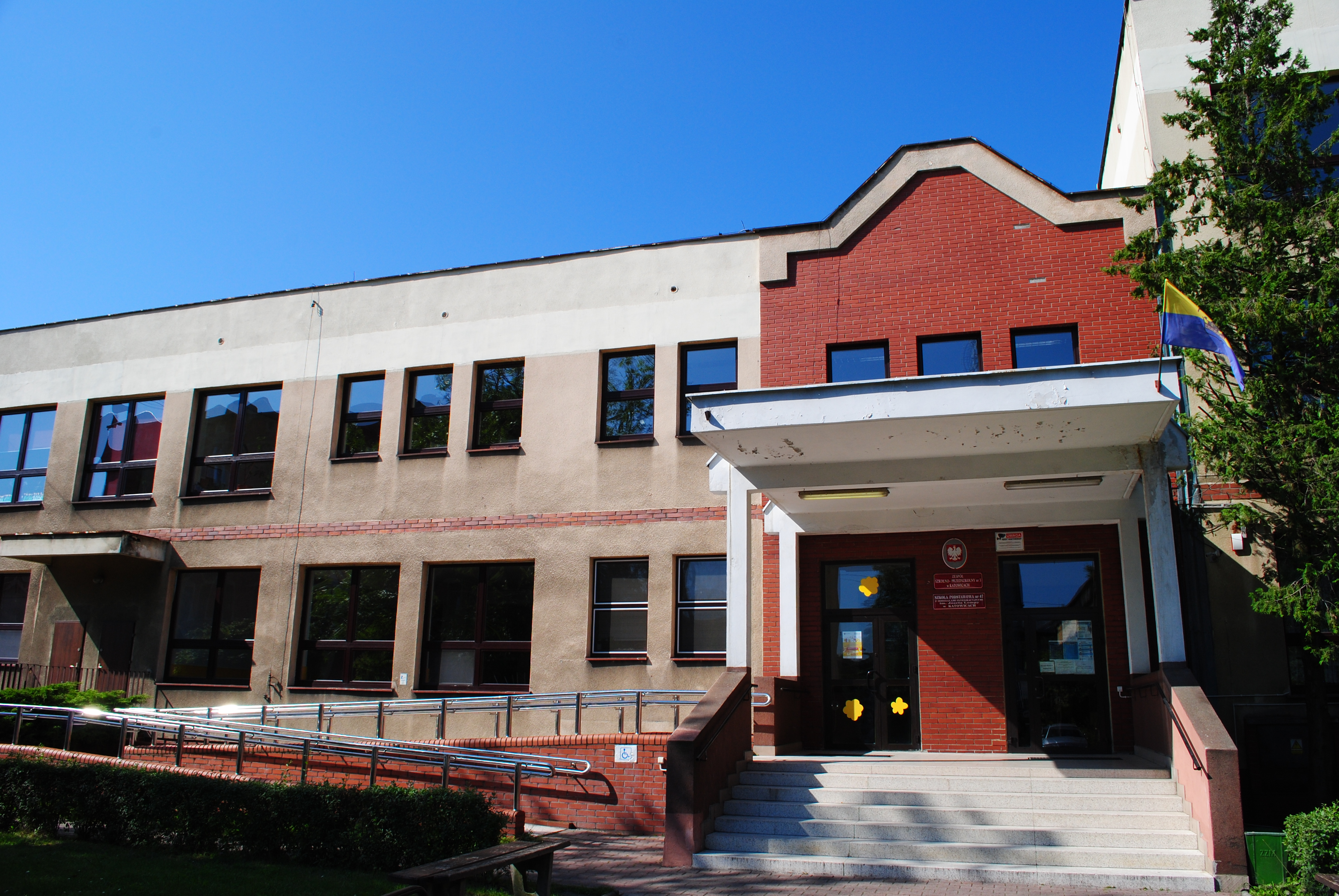
School-Kindergarten Complex No. 3 (new school building)

From the early 19th century, Dąbrówka Mała belonged to the School District in Bogucice, and children attended school only twice a week. Efforts to obtain permission to build a school in Dąbrówka Mała began in 1841, when the authorities agreed to establish a separate school district in Gmina Dąbrówka Mała. The wooden school was officially opened on 24 October 1847. It was located on the site of the current Biedronka store, at 13 Henri Le Rond Street. The first teacher was Józef Pusz, and 109 children attended the school during its first year of operation. Due to the growing population of Dąbrówka Mała, a decision was made to build a school in Burowiec (now the Szopienice-Burowiec district). Education at the new school began in 1861. Both schools were under the authority of the parson of Bogucice, Leopold Markiefka.

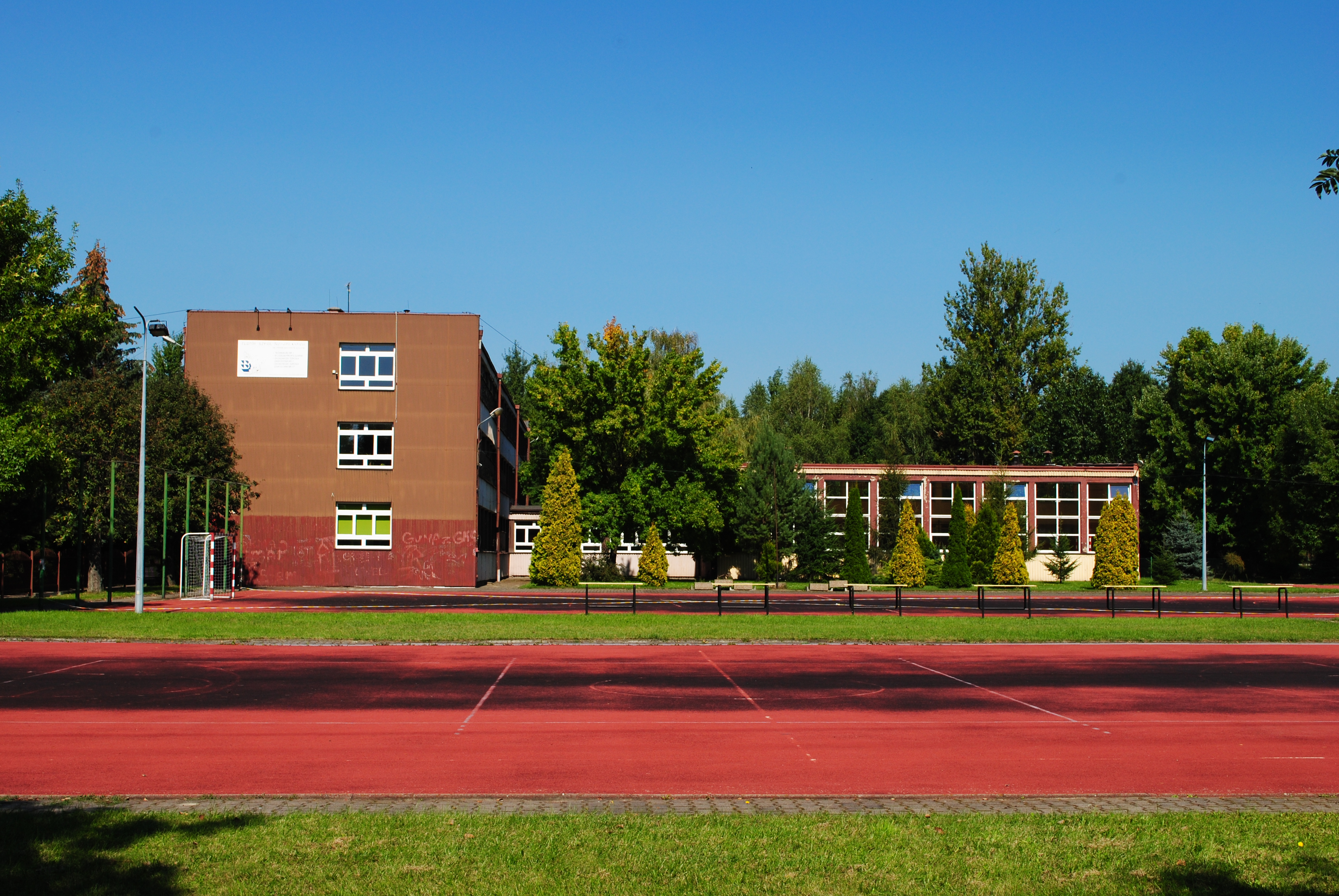
High School and Sports Excellence Primary School

Children from Pniaki also began attending the first school, where classes were taught in Polish and German. A new school building, constructed on the site of the original wooden structure, was completed in 1870 (the so-called "yellow school"). The building was fenced in and also had a garden. Six years later, the school was expanded with a new wing. In 1888, seven teachers taught in seven classes, and at the start of the school year, 561 children attended the school. Between 1910 and 1912, a new school building was constructed at 4 J. Grzegorzek Street (the so-called "red school"). The Primary School No. 1 was relocated there, and School No. 2 moved into the old building.

After Dąbrówka Mała was incorporated into Poland, a Polish school was opened on 5 September 1922, and in 1927 the school was divided into a boys' school (No. 2; in the "yellow school" building) and a girls' school (No. 1; in the "red school" building). In 1972, the two schools were merged to form Józef Lompa Primary School No. 47. In 1994, Primary School No. 47 was expanded with new buildings, including a gymnasium, a common room, and classrooms. The red school building was incorporated into the school in 1999 following renovation, while the "yellow school" building was demolished in 1994. In 2007, School-Kindergarten Complex No. 3 was formed through merger with Kindergarten No. 58.

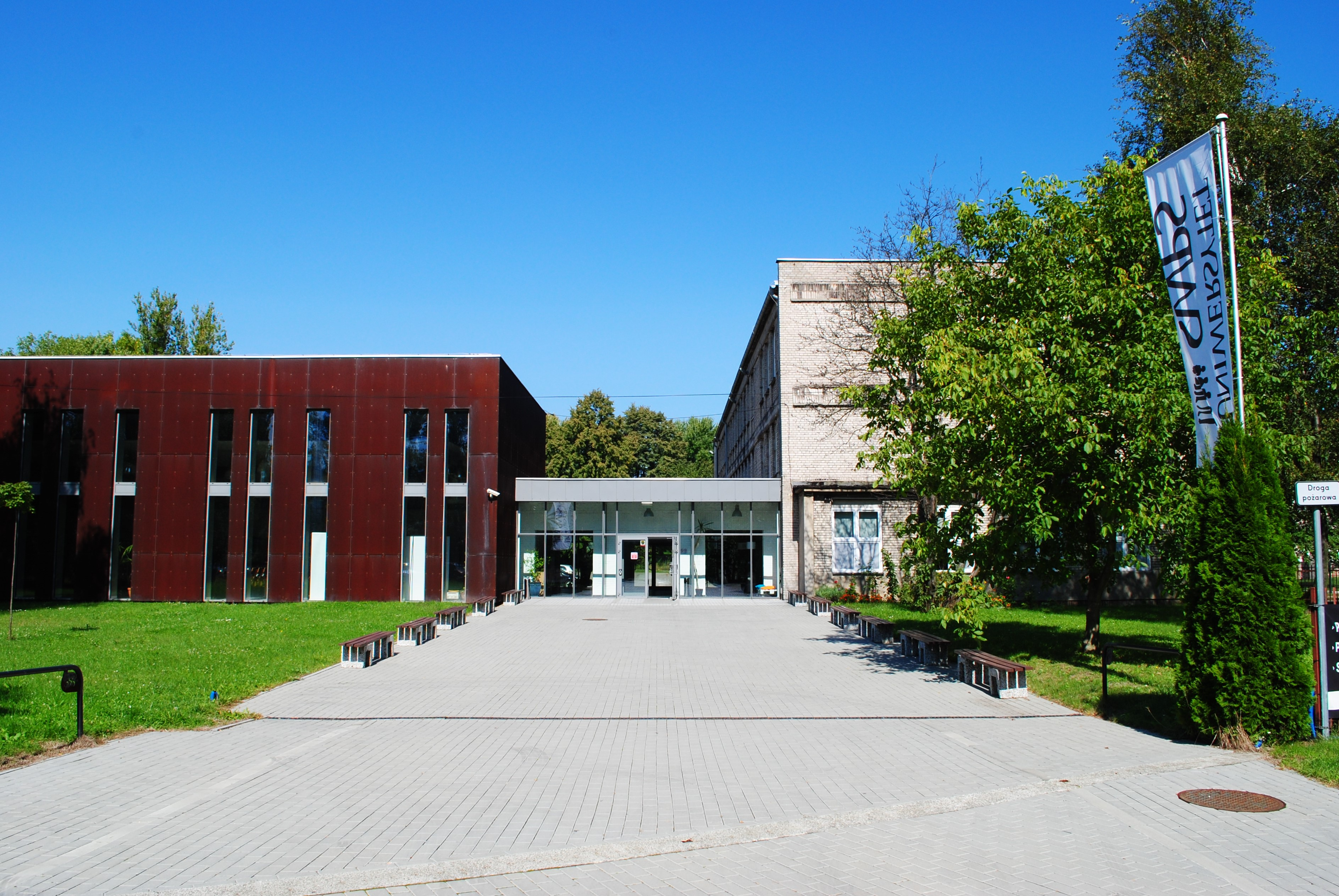
SWPS University Branch at 9 Techników Street

As of September 2020, the following educational institutions are located in Dąbrówka Mała:

- Branch of the Municipal Nursery (2 J. Grzegorzek Street);
- School-Kindergarten Complex No. 3:
  - Municipal Kindergarten No. 38 (72 J. Haller Street),
  - Municipal Kindergarten No. 58 (4 J. Grzegorzek Street),
  - Józef Lompa Primary School No. 47 with Integration Classes (4 J. Grzegorzek Street);
- Sports Excellence High School and Sports Excellence Primary School (7 Techników Street).

In addition, Dąbrówka Mała is a hub for vocational and higher education institutions. As of September 2020, the following institutions are located there:

- Zofia Szlenkierówna Silesian Voivodeship Medical Post-Secondary School (3 Wiertnicza Street);
- SWPS University. Katowice Branch (9 Techników Street);
- Silesian Insurgents Katowice Vocational Education Center (11 Techników Street; consisting of Technical Secondary School No. 1 and Branch Vocational School of the First Degree).

== Religion ==
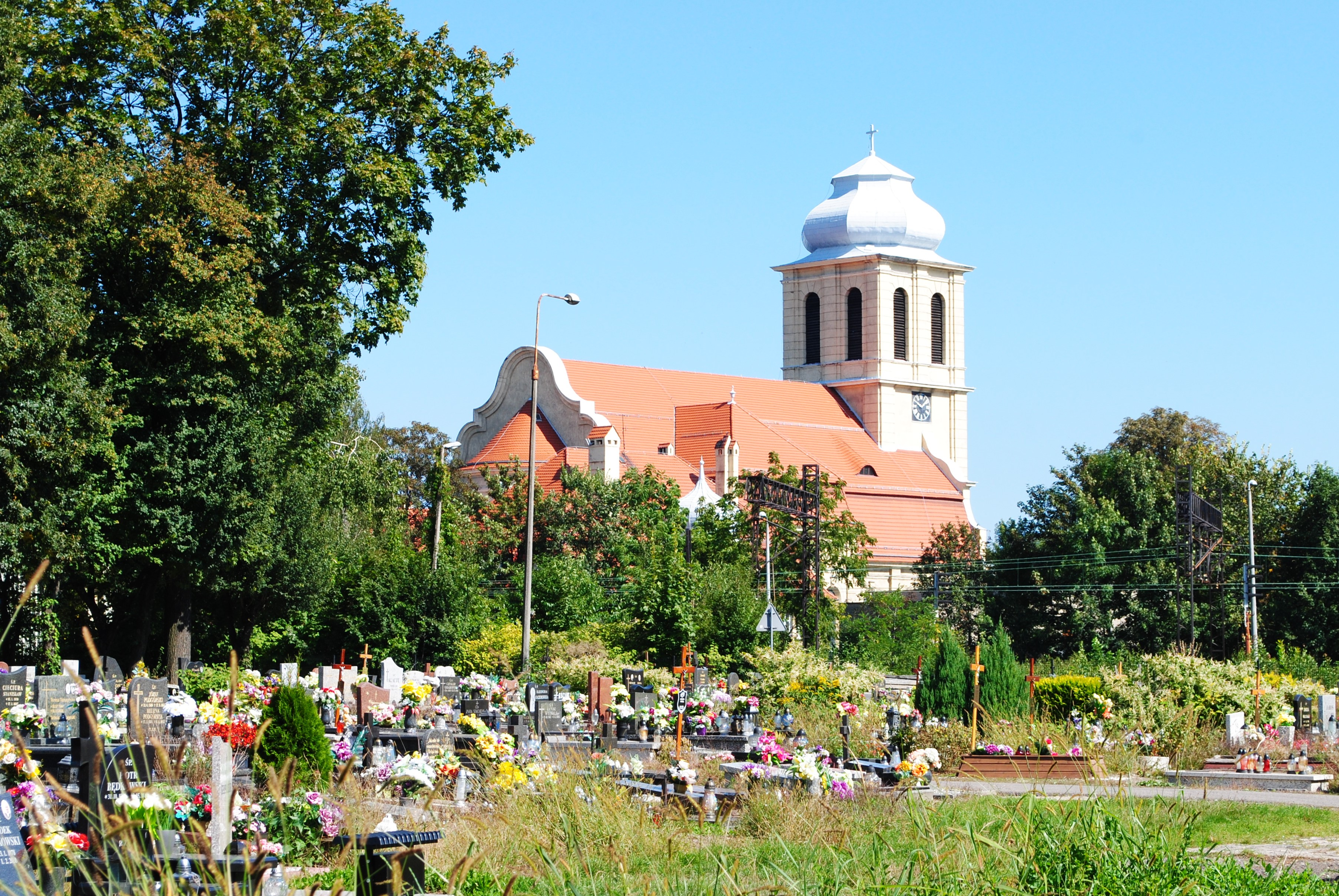
Church of the Parish of St. Anthony of Padua and cemetery at Henri Le Rond Street

Dąbrówka Mała is home to the Roman Catholic Parish of St. Anthony of Padua (part of the Katowice-Bogucice deanery; the parson of Dąbrówka Mała, Father Andrzej Noras, serves as the deanery's vice-dean), with a Baroque Revival church built between 1907 and 1912. The rectory and parish office are located at 4 Independence Avenue. The parish boundaries extend beyond the district's statutory area. In 2015, it had approximately 8,300 parishioners. The parish cemetery, established in 1913, is located on Henri Le Rond Street. From the 18th century, the faithful of Dąbrówka belonged to the parish in Bogucice, and earlier to the Parish of St. Stanislaus in Czeladź. The parish in Dąbrówka Mała was established on 1 April 1911, while the church was consecrated on 17 November 1912. The parish and the church were created largely thanks to the efforts of Father Ludwik Skowronek from the parish in Bogucice.

== Sport and recreation ==
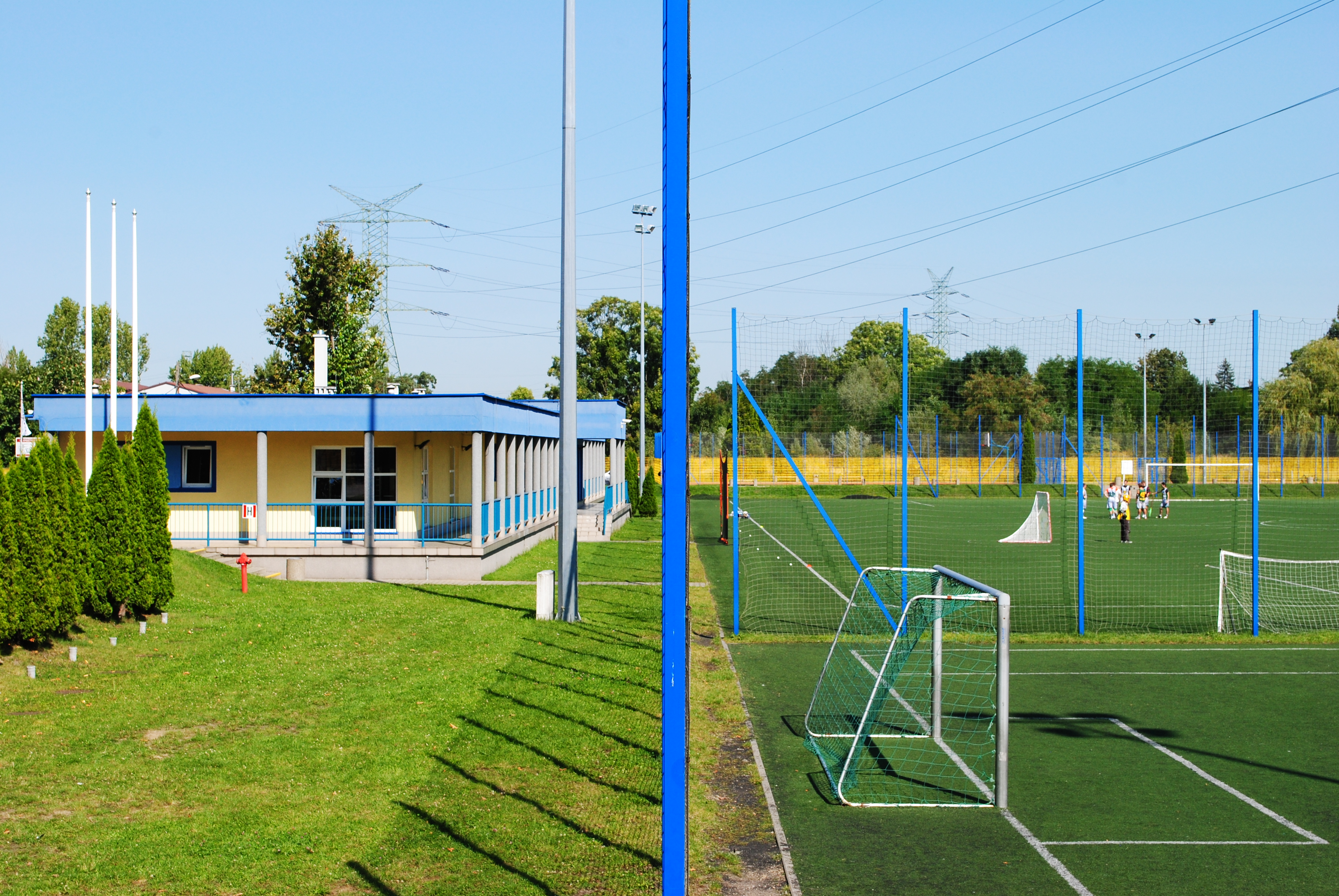
Hetman 22 Katowice club's sports complex on W. Siwek Street

Sports in Dąbrówka Mała began to develop rapidly after World War I. On 12 January 1919, a branch of the oldest Polish sports organization, the Sokół Polish Gymnastic Society, was established in Dąbrówka Mała. It was organizationally subordinate to the 2nd Katowice District of the Sokół Polish Gymnastic Society and belonged to a number of gymnastics sections of the Silesian Sokół. Initially, in 1920, the branch of this organization had 150 members in the town. It mainly brought together farmers and workers. The development of Sokół's activities was interrupted in 1939 by the outbreak of World War II. It was not reactivated in the postwar period because its members and the very idea of the society were persecuted by the communist authorities.

The Hetman 22 Katowice club's stadium on W. Siwek Street is the only full-size soccer field in Dąbrówka Mała and has an artificial turf surface, as well as a smaller training field, two tennis courts, and a multipurpose court for volleyball and basketball. The club also runs a soccer academy. There is also the Pod Młynem field (soccer fields between Milowicka and Pod Młynem streets).

== Public safety ==
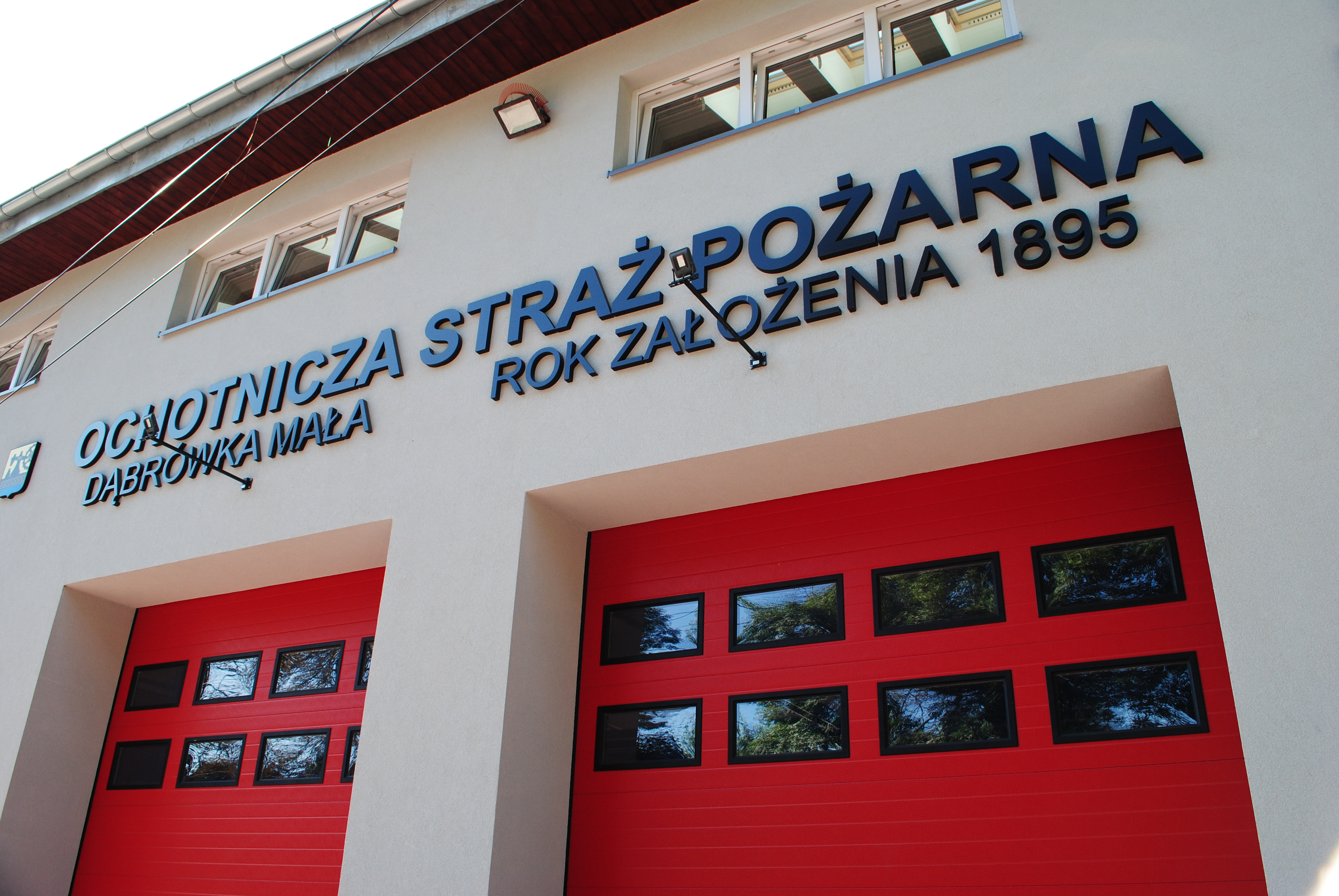
Headquarters of the Dąbrówka Mała Volunteer Fire Department

Dąbrówka Mała is home to the Private Healthcare Center PULS-MED Katowice (formerly a public healthcare facility; it is located in the former gmina town hall) and a private dental center. The nearest hospital is in Bogucice, about 1 km from Dąbrówka, (Brothers Hospitallers of Saint John of God's Hospital of the Guardian Angels; until the end of 2008 – the Ludwik Rydygier Municipal Hospital).

Dąbrówka Mała is also home to a preventive care center (4 Independence Avenue), run by Halina Nawara's Educational Therapy Office (16 places) and providing support to children with behavioral disorders who come from dysfunctional families facing challenges in care and upbringing.

Dąbrówka Mała is part of the second district of Police Precinct 2 in Katowice, located at 2 K. Iłłakowiczówna Street. The district covers areas 31 and 32. The Volunteer Fire Department has its headquarters at 33 Strzelców Bytomskich Street. It was established on 6 October 1895. In 1920, it had 110 members, including 41 active firefighters. The unit has been using its current headquarters since 1991, and a new banner was donated to mark the unit's centennial.

== Gallery ==
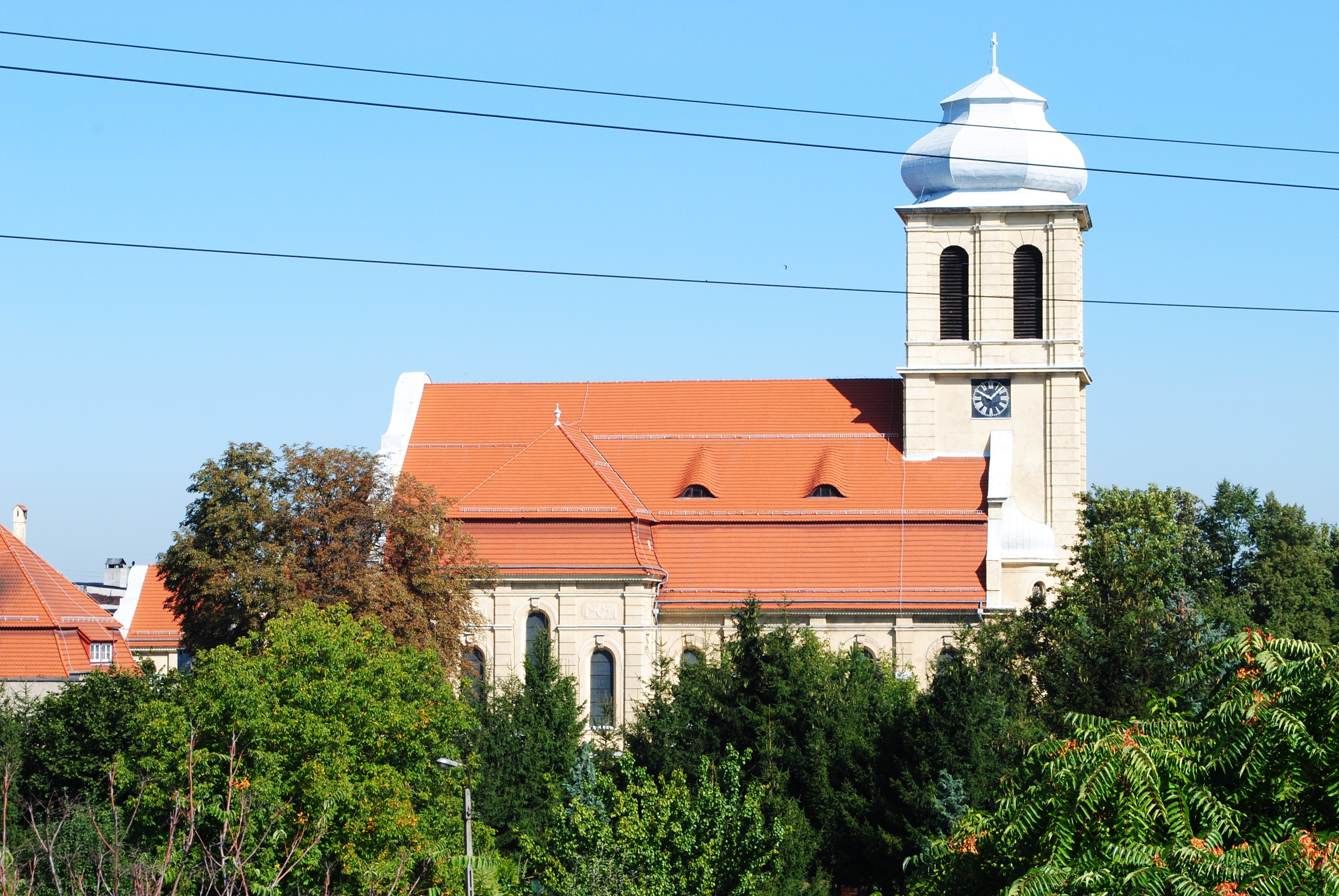
Saint Anthony church

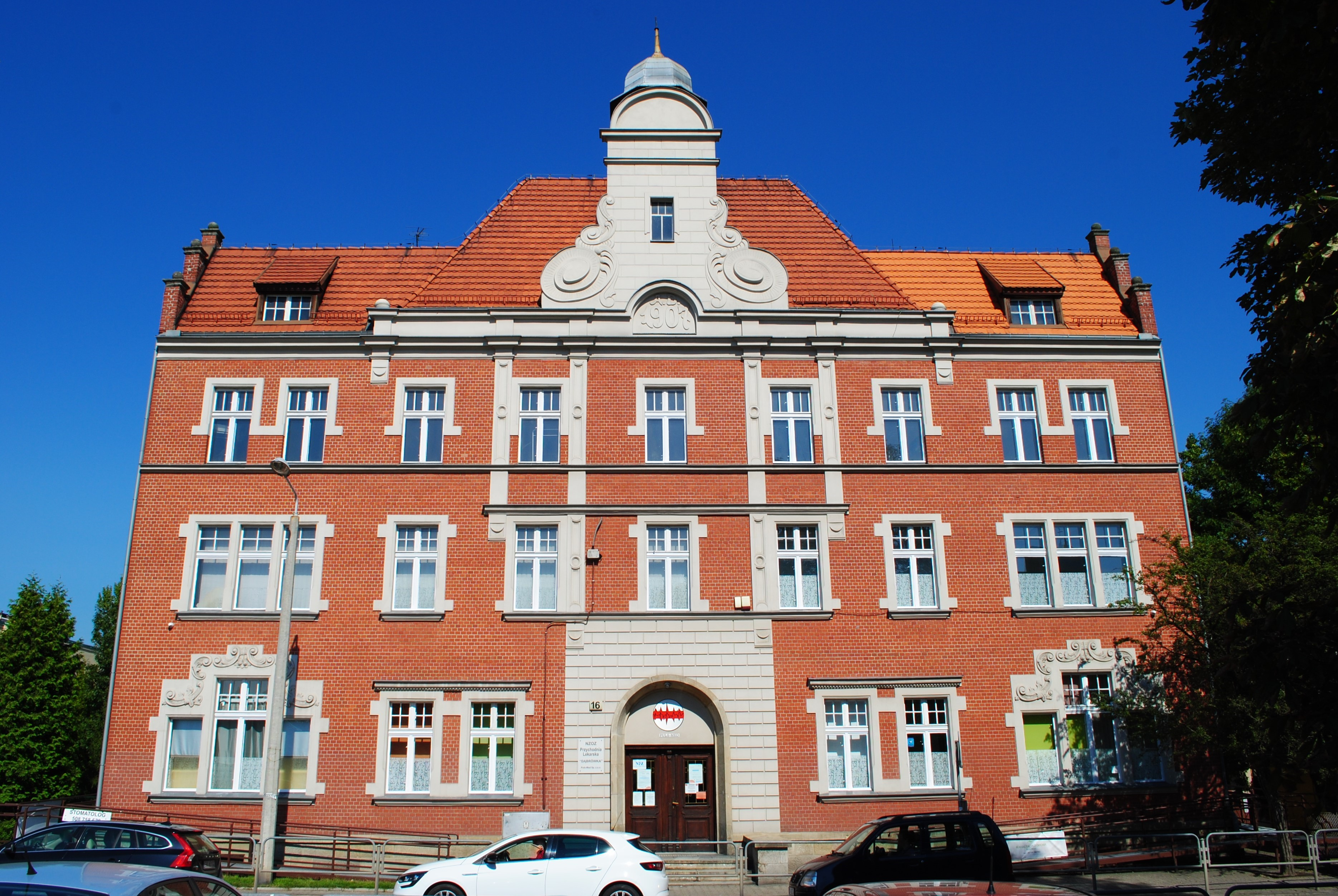
Former gmina office

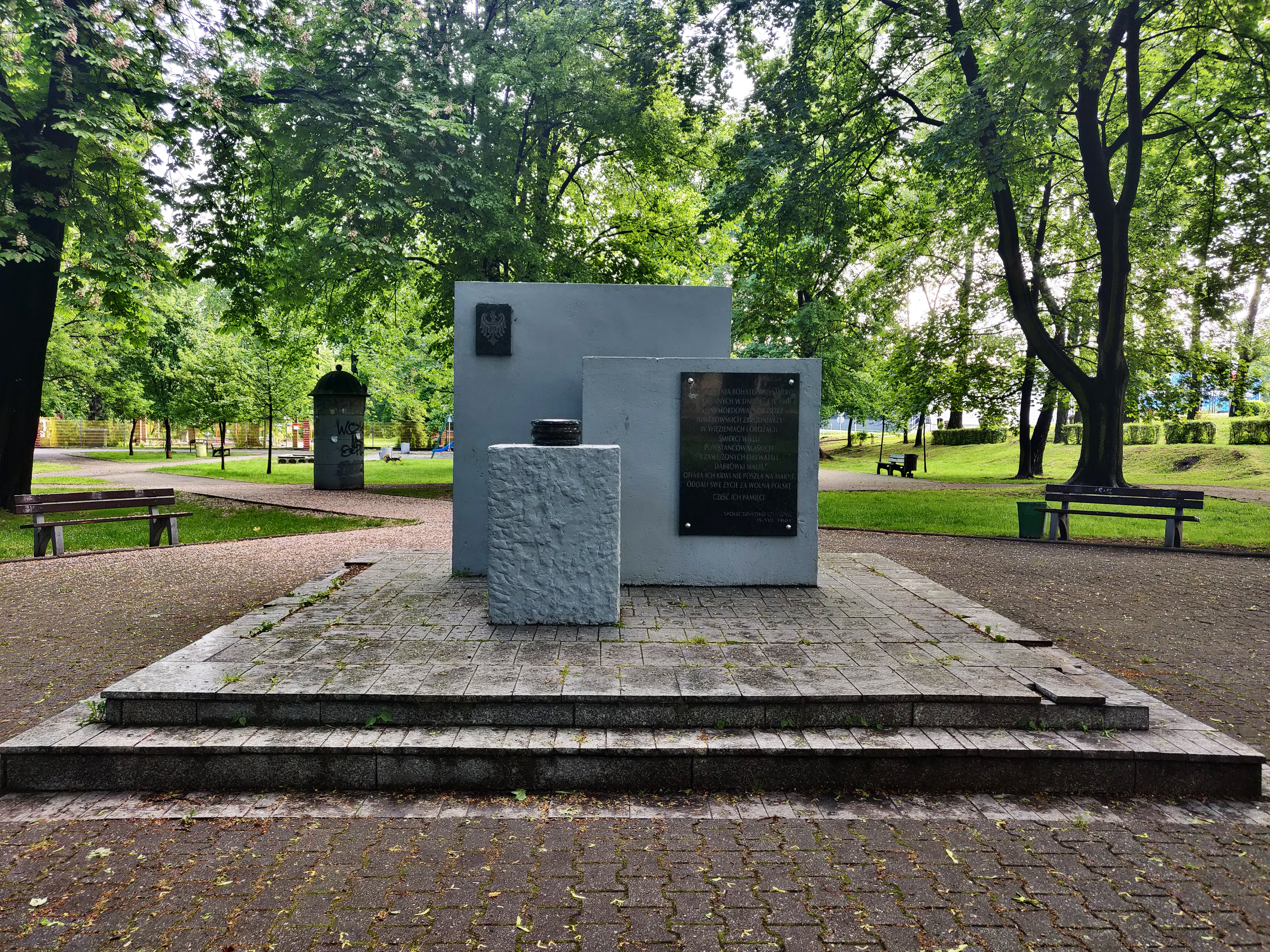
Monument to Poles massacred in 1940

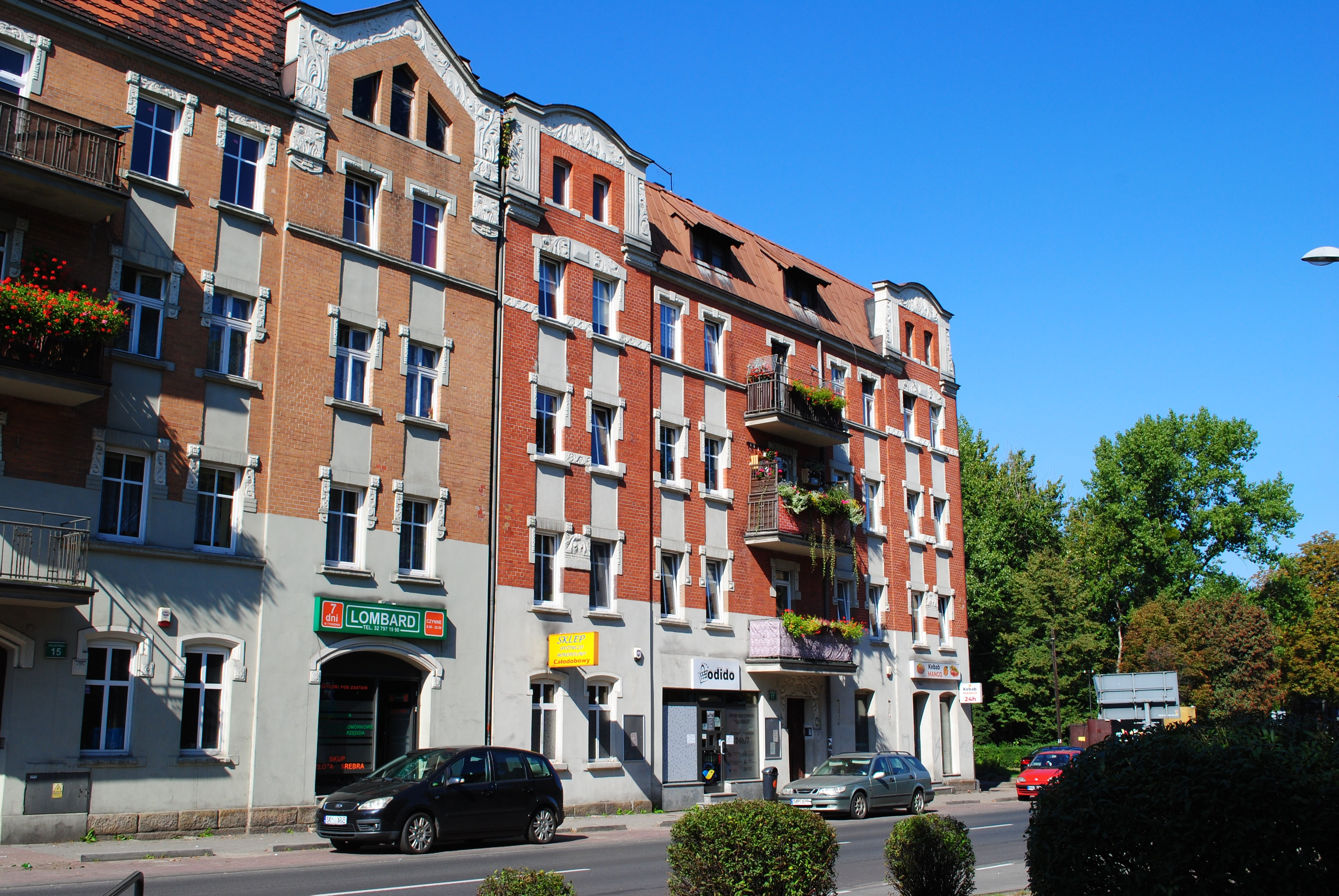
Old tenement houses

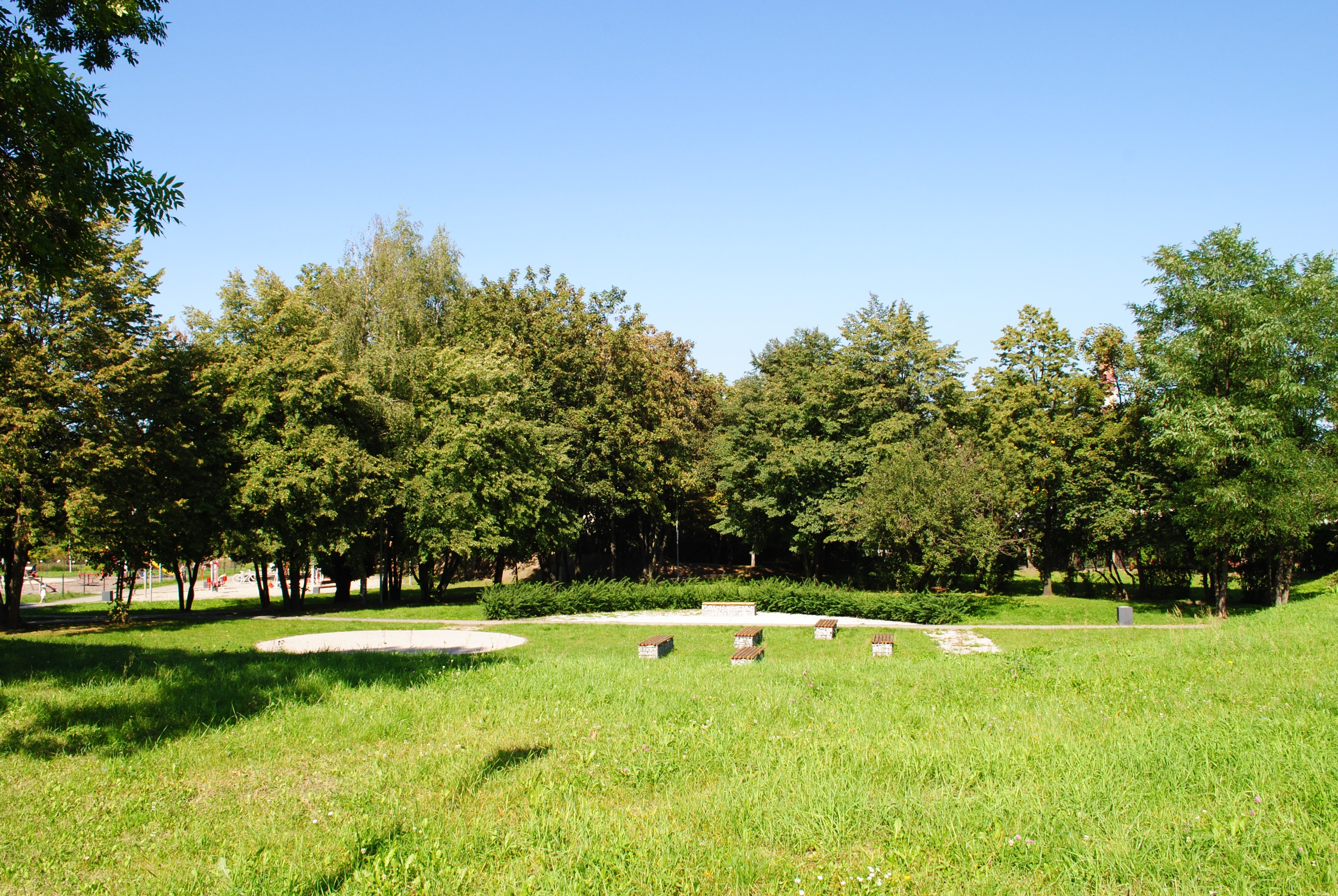
Park Zielony Zakątek

== Bibliography ==
- Absalon, Damian; Czaja, Stanisław; Jankowski, Andrzej T. (2012). "Środowisko geograficzne" [Geographical Environment]. In Barciak, A.; Chojecka, E.; Fertacz, F. (eds.). Katowice. Środowisko, dzieje, kultura, język i społeczeństwo [Katowice. Environment, History, Culture, Language, and Society] (in Polish). Vol. 1. Katowice: Museum of History of Katowice. ISBN 978-83-8772-724-6.
- Bulsa, Michał (2018). Ulice i place Katowic [Streets and Squares of Katowice] (in Polish) (3rd ed.). Katowice: Prasa i Książka. ISBN 978-83-63780-28-9.
- Bulsa, M.; Grzegorek, G.; Witaszczyk, B. (2013). Domy i gmachy Katowic [Houses and Public Buildings of Katowice] (in Polish). Katowice: Prasa i Książka. ISBN 978-83-63780-00-5.
- Drobek, Daria; Michalska, Ewa; Radecki, Ryszard; Perdyła, Magdalena (January 2014). Opracowanie ekofizjograficzne podstawowe z elementami opracowania ekofizjograficznego problemowego (problematyka ochrony dolin rzecznych oraz ograniczeń dla zagospodarowania terenu wynikających z wpływu działalności górniczej) dla potrzeb opracowania projektów miejscowych planów zagospodarowania przestrzennego obszarów położonych w mieście Katowice [Basic Ecophysiographic Study with Elements of a Problem-Oriented Ecophysiographic Study (Issues of River Valley Protection and Constraints on Land Development Resulting from the Impact of Mining Activity) for the Purposes of Preparing Draft Local Spatial Development Plans for Areas Located within the City of Katowice] (in Polish). Katowice: Werona.
- Fajer, M. (2008). "Gleby na obszarze Górnośląskiego Związku Metropolitalnego" [Soils in the Area of the Metropolitan Association of Upper Silesia]. In Dulias, R.; Hibszer, A. (eds.). Górnośląski Związek Metropolitalny. Zarys geograficzny [Metropolitan Association of Upper Silesia. Geographical Outline] (in Polish). Sosnowiec: Polish Geographical Society. ISBN 978-83-61695-00-4.
- Soida, K., ed. (1997). Dzieje katowickiego okręgu kolejowego [History of the Katowice Railway District] (in Polish). Katowice: Silesian Regional Directorate of State Railways. ISBN 83-908518-0-6.
- Szaraniec, Lech (1996). Osady i osiedla Katowic [Settlements and Housing Estates of Katowice] (in Polish). Katowice: Artur. ISBN 83-905115-0-9.
- Tokarska-Guzik, B.; Rostański, A.; Kupka, R. (2002). Katowice. Przyroda miasta [Katowice. Naure of the City] (in Polish). Katowice: Kubajak. ISBN 83-87971-49-9.
- Zemła, Marek, ed. (25 April 2012). Studium uwarunkowań i kierunków zagospodarowania przestrzennego miasta Katowice – II edycja. Część 1. Uwarunkowania zagospodarowania przestrzennego [Study of the Conditions and Directions of Spatial Development of the City of Katowice – Second Edition. Part One. Conditions of Spatial Development] (PDF) (in Polish). Katowice: Biuro Rozwoju Regionu.
