= Architecture of Katowice =

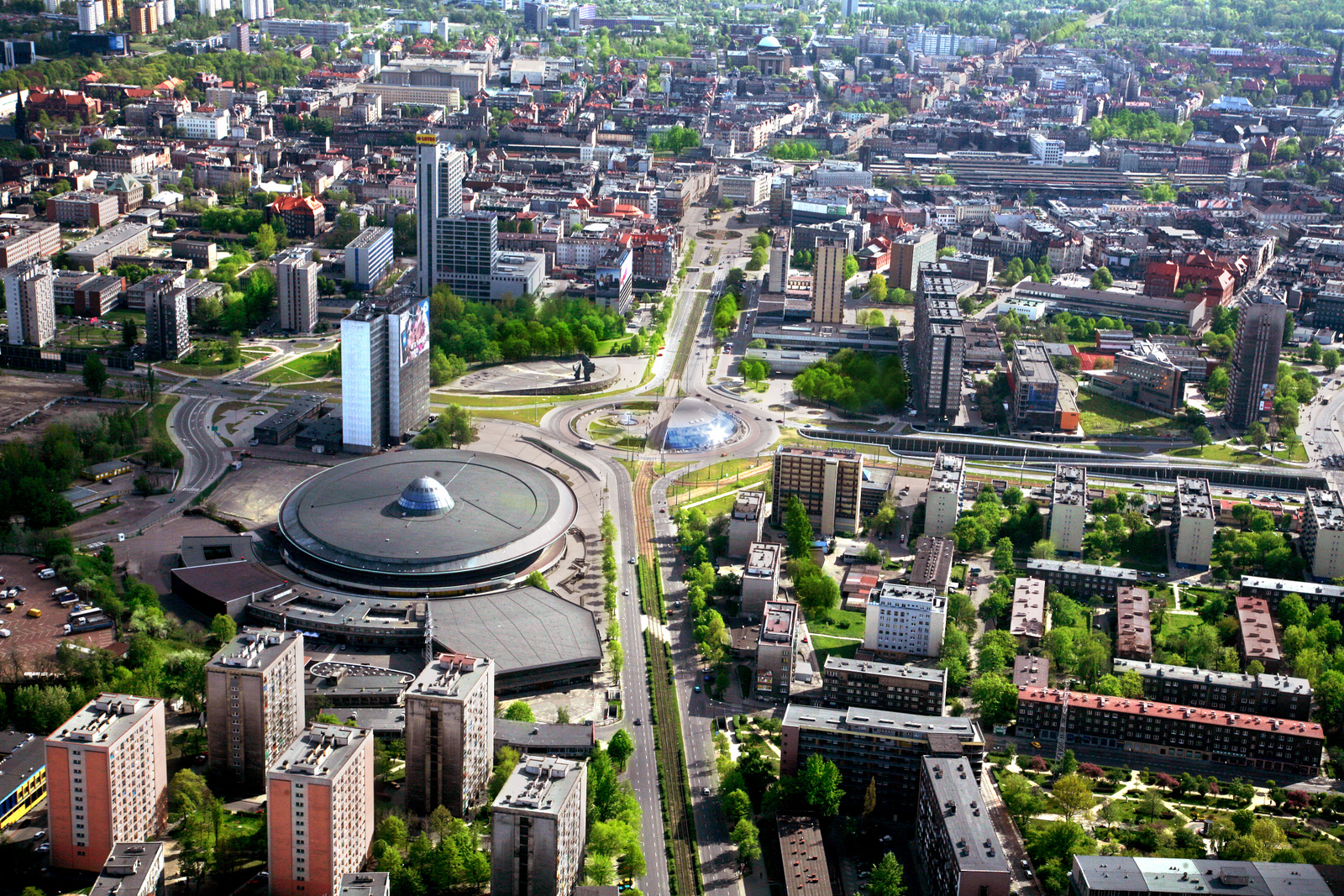
View of downtown Katowice in 2007 at the height of Wojciech Korfanty Avenue; in the center Jerzy Ziętek Square

The architecture of Katowice encompasses a diverse range of styles and periods, reflecting the city's history and its development from an industrial centre to a contemporary business and cultural hub. The downtown area, which began developing in the 1840s with a planned street grid and squares, features a variety of buildings, including late-19th- and early-20th-century tenements and public structures in historicist, eclectic, and Art Nouveau styles; modern and International Style buildings from the interwar period; and post-war as well as contemporary structures. The city centre is surrounded by districts of varied origins, including former independent villages and gminas (including Bogucice, Dąb, Piotrowice, Szopienice, and Załęże), company housing estates (Giszowiec and Nikiszowiec), post-war housing estates (including Osiedle Tysiąclecia, Osiedle Walentego Roździeńskiego, Osiedle Paderewskiego, and Osiedle Odrodzenia), as well as more recent residential developments (including Osiedle Bażantowo, Dębowe Tarasy, and Osiedle Książęce).

== General description ==
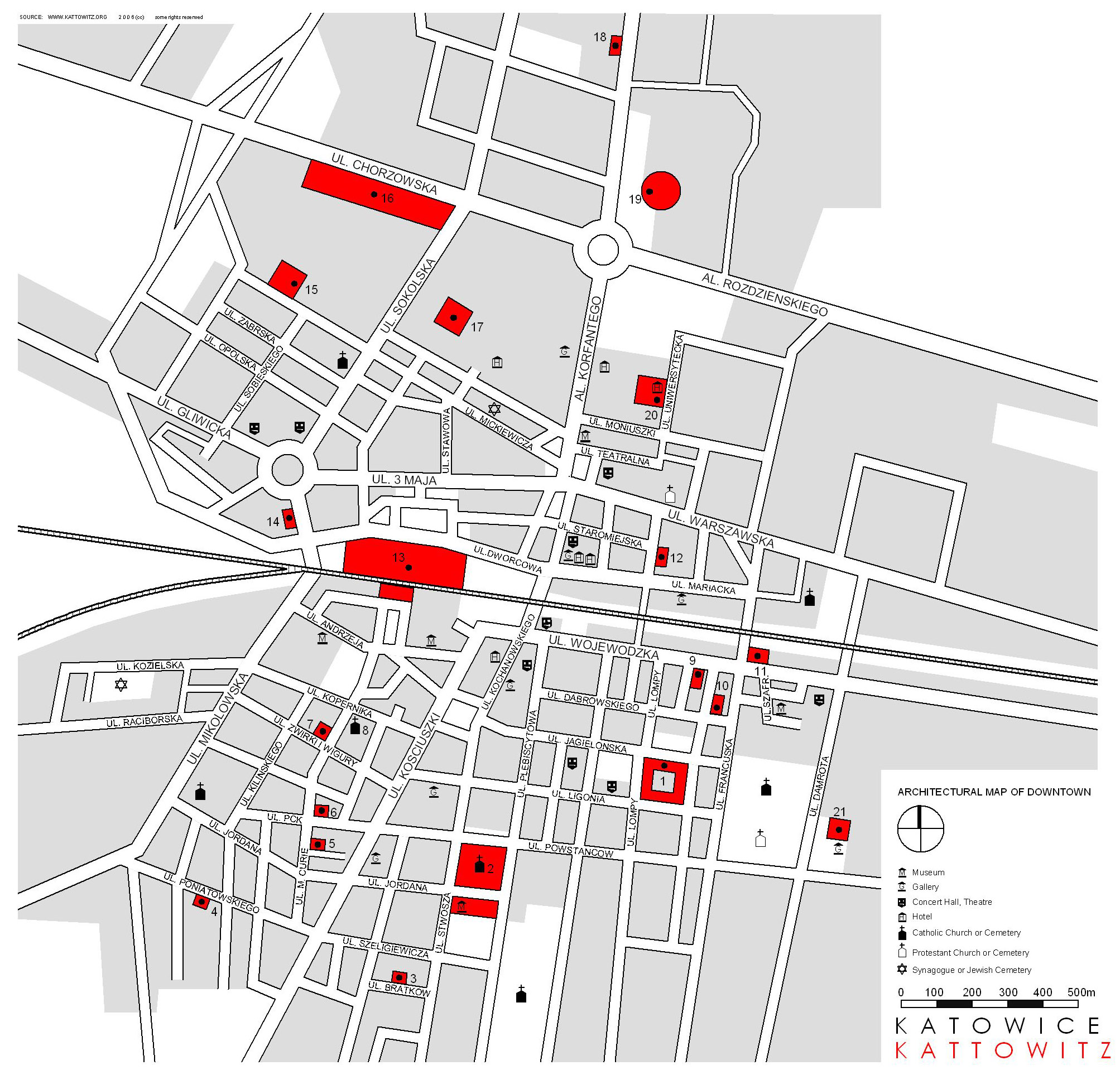
Architectural map of central Katowice from 2007, showing the most important buildings and structures at that time

The architectural and urban structure of Katowice reflects the city's origins and its city-forming factors, including its resource-based economy. The city features a well-defined downtown area with a coherent and planned layout, as well as a series of districts with varied origins, functions, and structures. This layout developed over a relatively short period, beginning with the arrival of the first railway in the 1840s. The districts incorporated into Greater Katowice in 1924 (Bogucice, Brynów, Dąb, Ligota, Załęże, and Zawodzie) are most closely integrated with Śródmieście, while the southern districts (Murcki, Kostuchna, Podlesie, and Zarzecze) have the weakest connections. The eastern part of the city, incorporated at the end of 1959, also retains a distinct character.

The axis of Katowice's urban composition is formed by 3 Maja Street and Warszawska Street, intersecting at the Market Square. This axis is marked by two squares: Freedom Square and Fr. E. Szramek Square. Nearby, perpendicular to this axis, are two additional areas: Karol Miarka Square and Jerzy Ziętek Square with its surrounding public spaces showcasing buildings that are symbols of Katowice – the Spodek and the Silesian Insurgents Memorial.

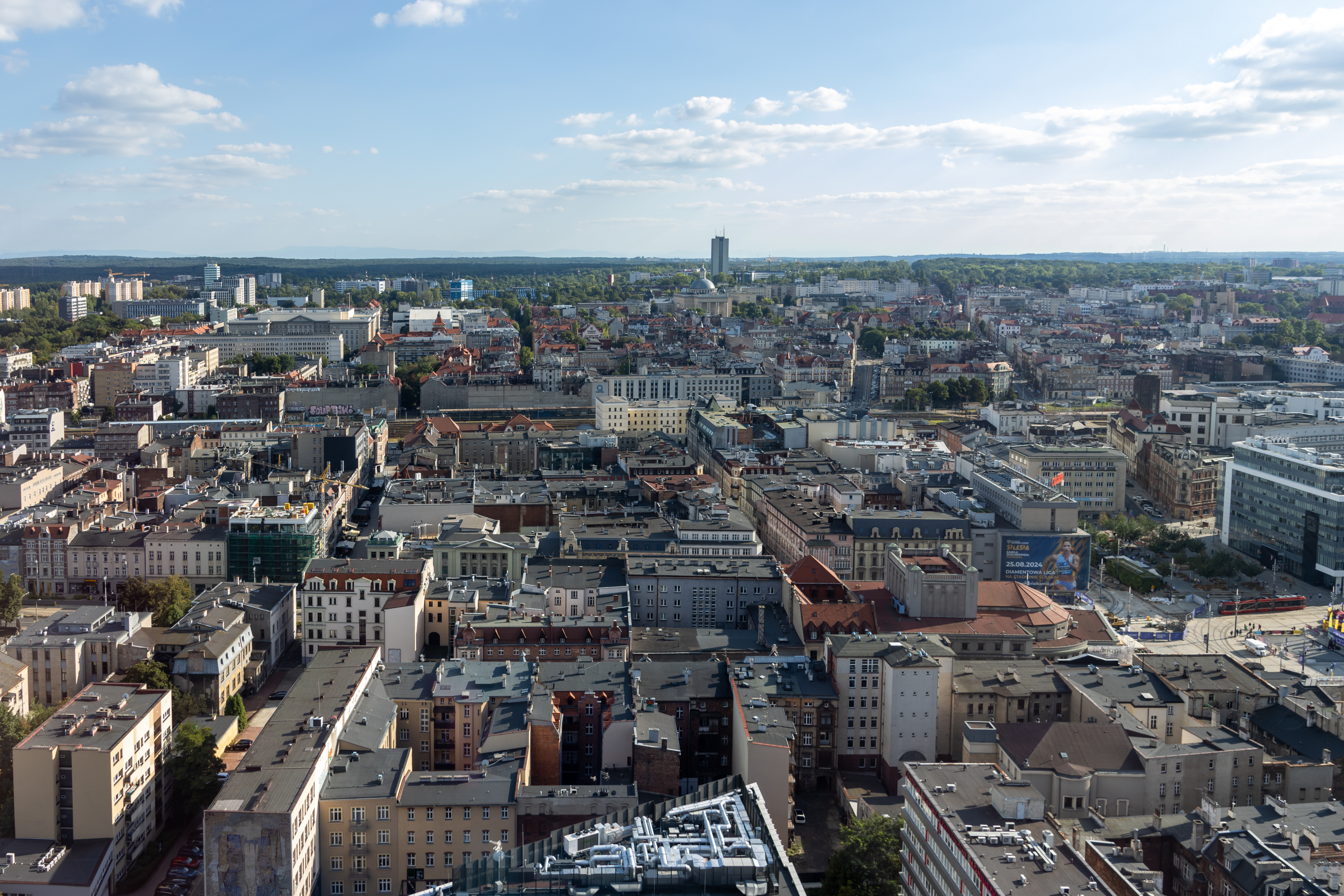
View of downtown Katowice from the Altus Skyscraper (2024)

Adam Mickiewicz Street and Mariacka Street, terminating at St. Mary's Church, also hold significant compositional importance. Beyond Śródmieście, the urban fabric is further articulated by features such as Grunwaldzki Square and Council of Europe Square.

As of December 2007, residential areas dominated the structure of urbanised land, with single-family housing accounting for 11.9% of urbanised areas and multi-family housing 10.5%. Transportation areas comprised 22%, while production and service areas made up 14.4%, and other service areas 10.6%. Single-family residential development is concentrated in the western and southern districts – primarily in Piotrowice-Ochojec, Ligota-Panewniki, Kostuchna, Podlesie, and Zarzecze. Multi-family housing predominates in the downtown and northern districts, whereas service areas are mainly located in Śródmieście, Ligota-Panewniki, Piotrowice-Ochojec, and Osiedle Paderewskiego – Muchowiec.

In Katowice in 2007, built-up areas averaged 23% of the total land area, with a building coverage ratio of 0.5. These figures were highest in Śródmieście (50% and 1.79, respectively), while in other districts the proportion of built-up land ranged from 32% in Zawodzie and Załęże to 14–15% in Zarzecze and Podlesie.

== Pre-war architecture (until 1922) ==
=== Downtown Katowice ===
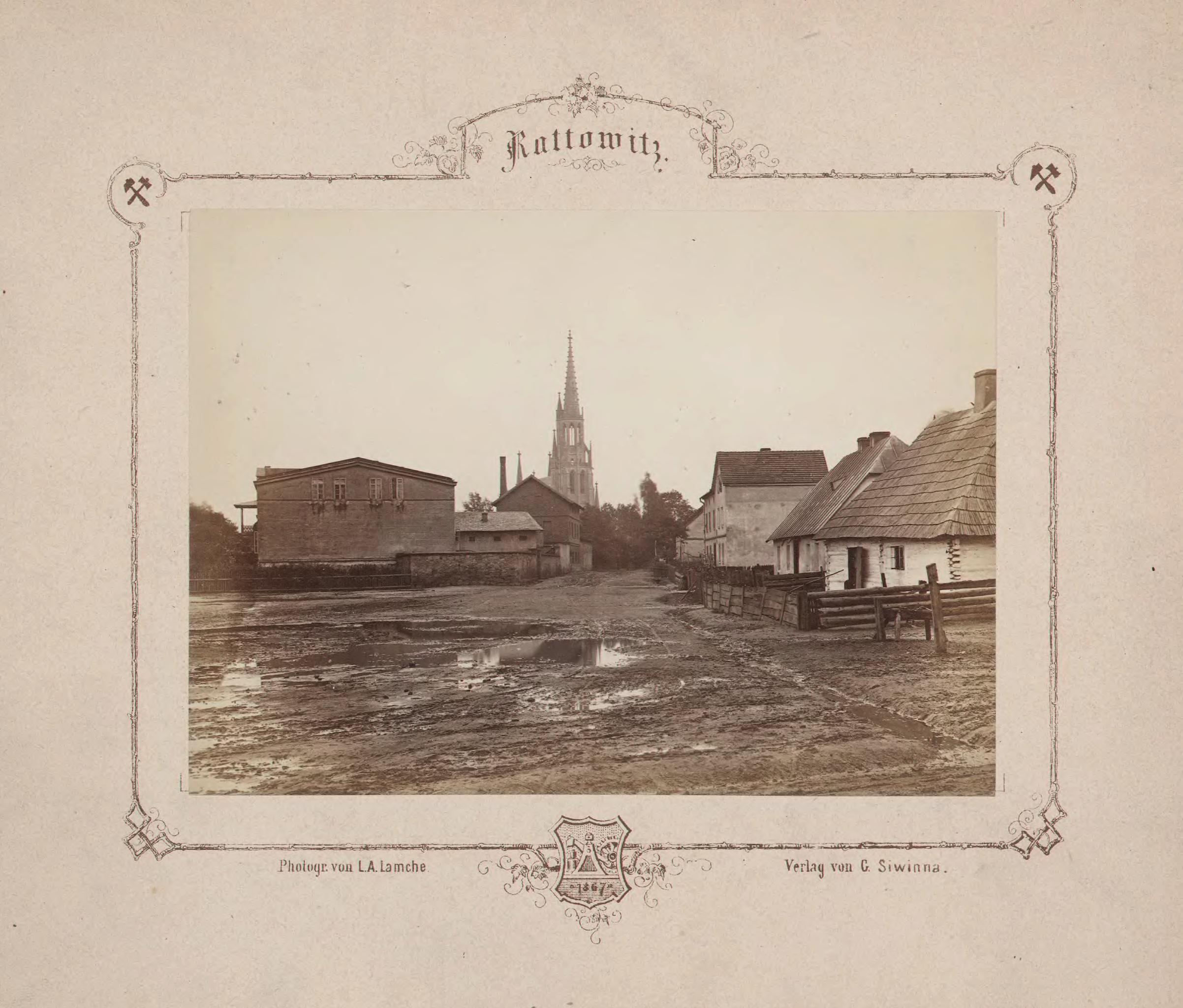
Starowiejska Street in a photograph from 1872; St. Mary's Church in the background

In the first half of the 19th century, Katowice was a small settlement, with its buildings consisting primarily of rural homesteads. Near a metallurgical pond stood the Bogucice Forge, opposite which were structures belonging to the manor farm. The original village of Katowice consisted of farmstead buildings located along Starowiejska Street, remnants of which were captured in photographs from around 1870. A lithograph by Ernest Knippel from 1848 depicts the original buildings of the Market Square, as well as nearby Franz and Franz foundries.

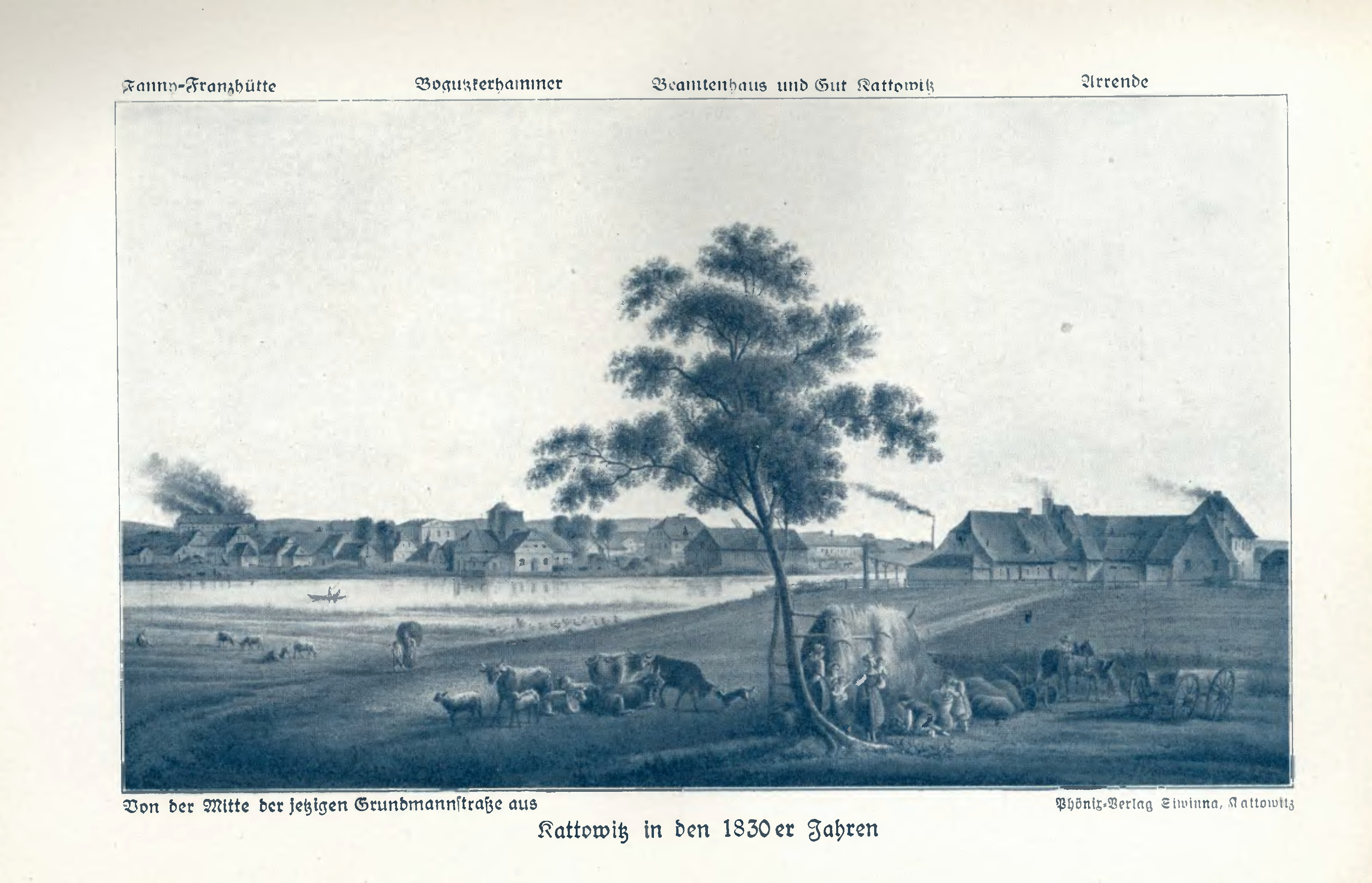
Katowice in the 1830s in a lithograph by Ernest Knippel

The transformation of Katowice into a town began in the mid-19th century, following the opening of a section of the Upper Silesian Railway, along with the railway station, on 3 October 1846. Its convenient location favored the growth of services and the establishment of various state administrative and economic institutions. Brick houses began to be constructed, and the first monumental architectural structure in Katowice was the Welt Hotel, erected in 1848. It remained the most impressive building until 1855, when the De Prusse Hotel was likely built between 1855 and 1858. In 1859, a new railway station was opened on Dworcowa Street.

The first regulatory plan for Katowice was prepared by Heinrich Moritz August Nottebohm in 1856, commissioned by Friedrich Grundmann. It proposed the creation of two squares – Wilhelmsplatz (later Freedom Square) and Friedrichsplatz (later Market Square) – intended to integrate the network of external streets connecting peripheral built-up areas. These squares were to be connected by a central road, known from 1868 as Grundmannstrasse (later 3 Maja Street). Its eastward extension was the route to Mysłowice, later Warszawska Street. From the Market Square, communication routes radiated towards Wełnowiec, Dąb, and Brynów, while from Freedom Square they ran along Gliwicka Street toward Załęże. The location of the Market Square was significantly influenced by the concentration in that area of service-oriented buildings, including an inn, a brewery, a smithy, and hotels.

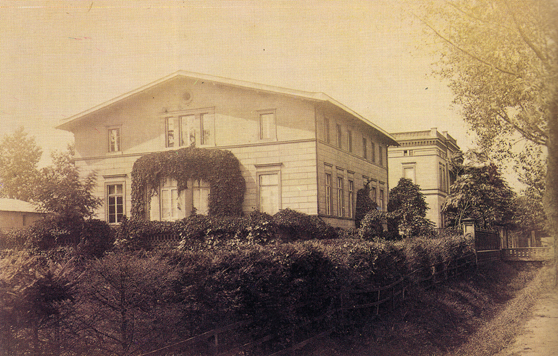
Dr. Richard Holtze's Villa in a photograph from before 1891

The granting of town privileges to Katowice on 11 September 1865 led to a flourishing of construction in the city. The oldest buildings in the present-day Śródmieście date back to the 1860s and 1870s. Initially, most structures were one- or two-storey and were only extended or heightened around the turn of the 19th and 20th centuries. Early buildings followed the historicist style, drawing on Gothic, Renaissance, Baroque, Rococo, and Classical architecture. The stylistic consistency of these early structures stemmed largely from the work of two local architects: Julius Haase and Ignatz Grünfeld.

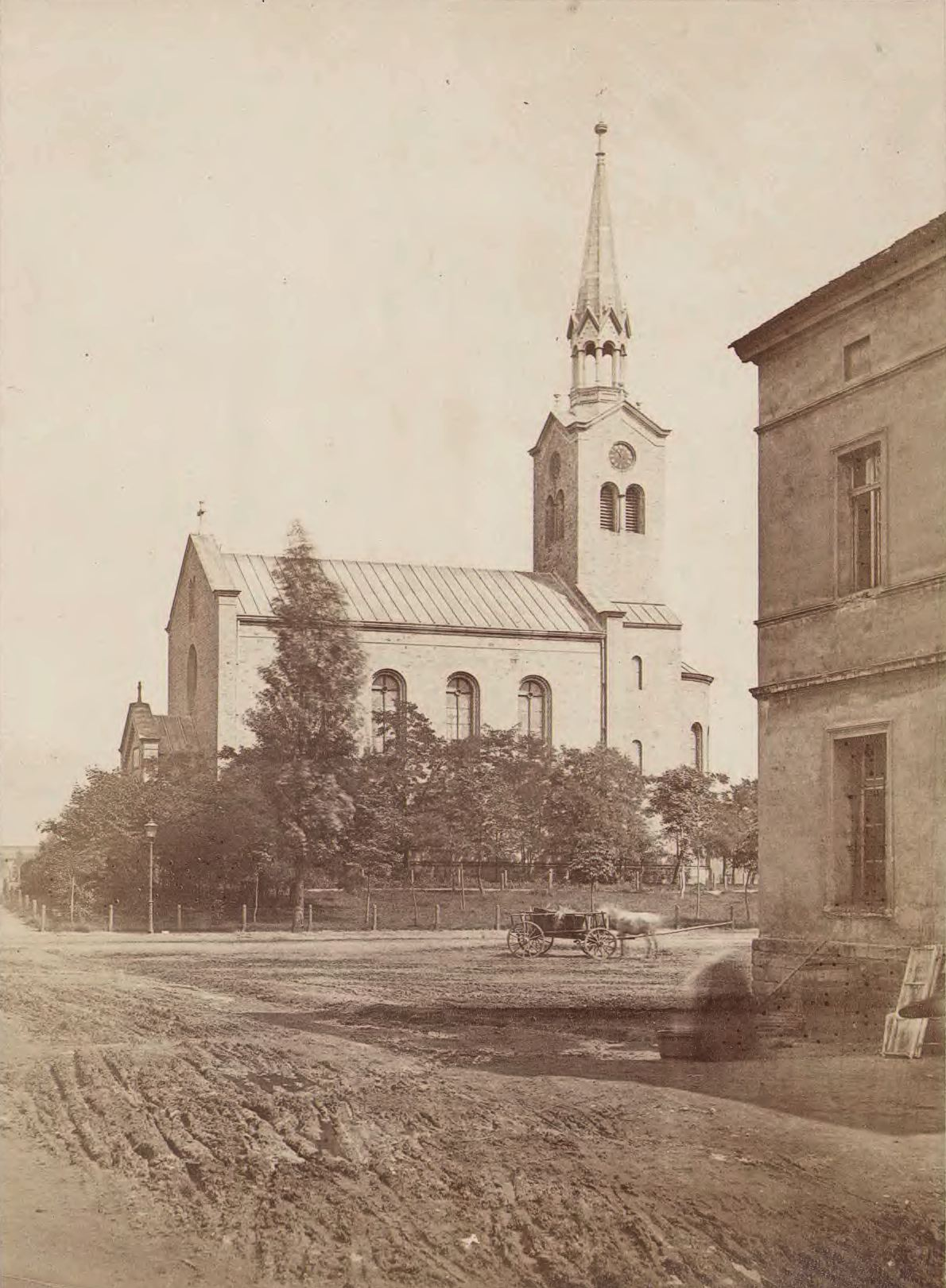
Church of the Resurrection in 1872

Numerous villas were initially erected along Warszawska, Francuska, and Dworcowa streets by wealthy burghers, including Richard Holtze, Julius Haase, and Ignatz Grünfeld. Several such villas survive on Warszawska Street, among them those of Ignatz Grünfeld, Edward Nacks, the Kramst family, and Julius Haase. Many others were later converted into tenements or demolished. Warszawska Street also saw the construction of the city's first major public buildings, including the Evangelical Church of the Resurrection, built between 1856 and 1858; the Roman Catholic St. Mary's Church, built between 1862 and 1870; the county starosta building in 1876; the Profitable Companies Bank building in the 1880s; and several Baroque Revival tenements (including No. 35).

In 1875, cadastral controller Napilly drew up a further spatial development plan as an extension of the 1856 plan, primarily to open vacant land for building. It introduced a regular grid layout within the city's contemporary boundaries. Earlier, at the turn of the 1860s and 1870s, streets were laid out on the eastern side of the city, including Mariacka Street. In the early 1870s, St. John Street was regulated, and a railway viaduct was built at its end. During the 1870s, expansion began south of the railway around Andrzeja Street and Mikołowska Street. By the end of 1870, Katowice had 48 three-storey buildings, 68 two-storey buildings, and 151 single-storey houses.

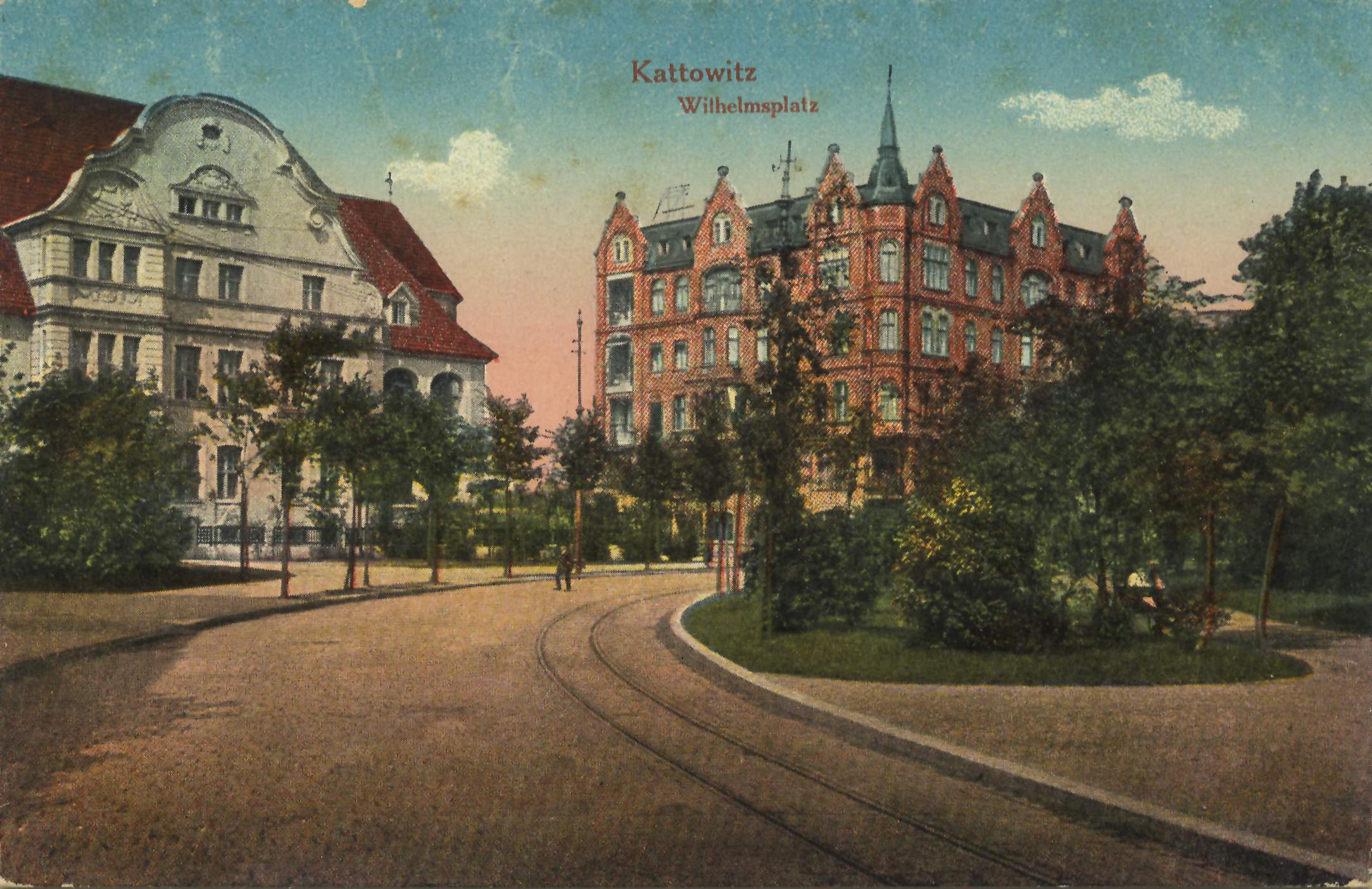
Fragment of Freedom Square on a postcard issued in 1917

In the last quarter of the 19th century, following an economic downturn from 1874 to 1880, Katowice saw intense building activity around Freedom Square, Mariacka Street, and the southern part of the city. Dozens of tenements were constructed in the eclectic style, many incorporating elements of historical styles. Development of Freedom Square began in the 1870s, with one of the most prominent structures being the headquarters of the company owned by brothers Abraham and Joseph Goldstein. The tenements built during this period often drew on 18th-century models: typically one- or two-storey double-tract houses with a central gateway, shops or workshops on the ground floor, gardens surrounding the building, and outbuildings at the rear.

At the turn of the 19th and 20th centuries, Art Nouveau and modernism styles emerged in Katowice's architecture, often combined with several styles, creating eclectic buildings. Art Nouveau was combined with Renaissance, Classicism, or other historical-eclectic styles. Classic examples of Art Nouveau architecture in the city include the tenements at 14 A. Mickiewicz Street and 11 F. Chopin Street.

By around 1914, Katowice had developed into a fully formed urban centre with public squares, offices, schools, hotels, hospitals, places of worship, cultural institutions, company headquarters, tenements, villas, and workers' housing. of the city was shaped by buildings filling the area between the railways to the south and the industrial zones north of the Rawa river.

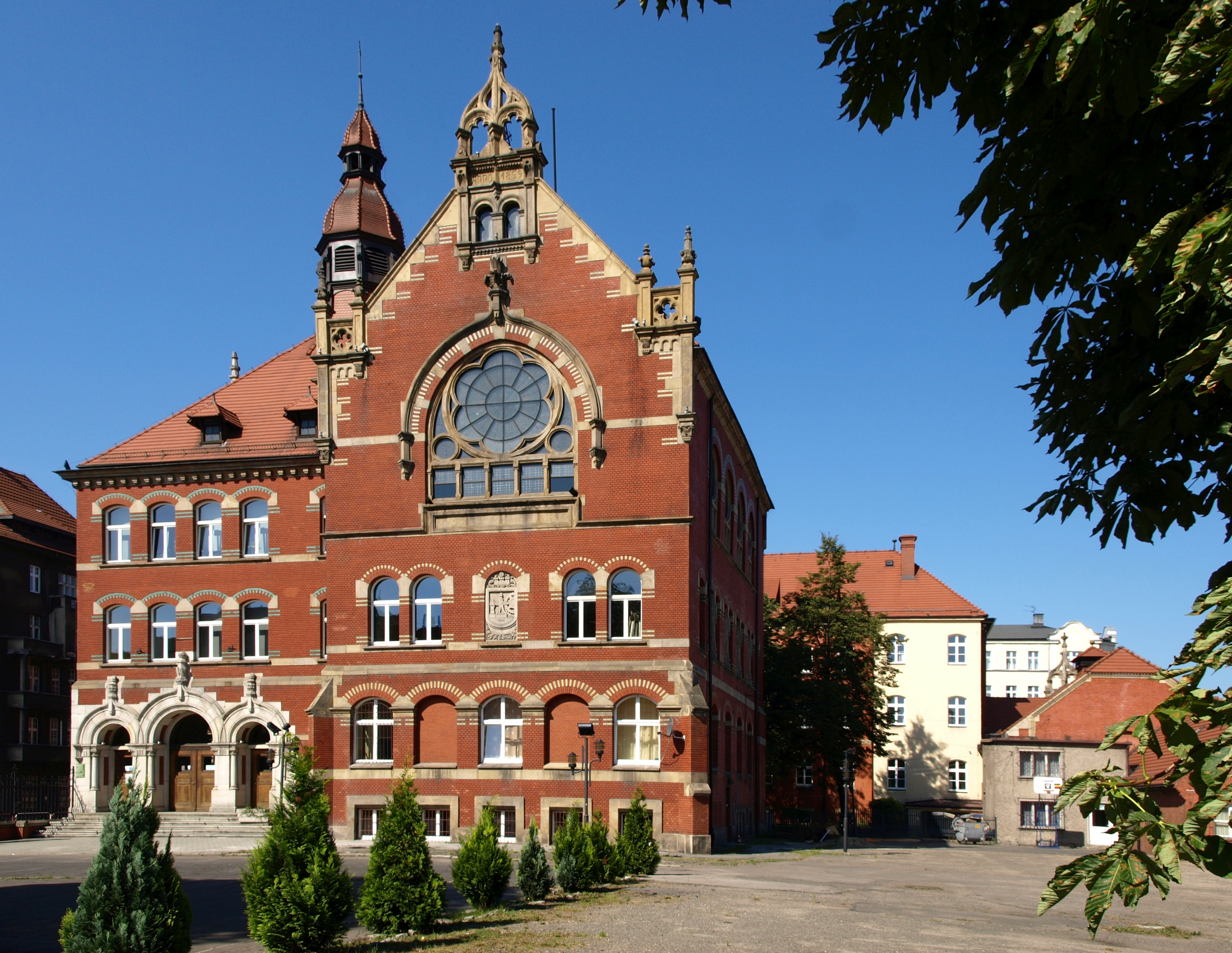
Building of the Adam Mickiewicz High School located at 11 Adam Mickiewicz Street (2011)

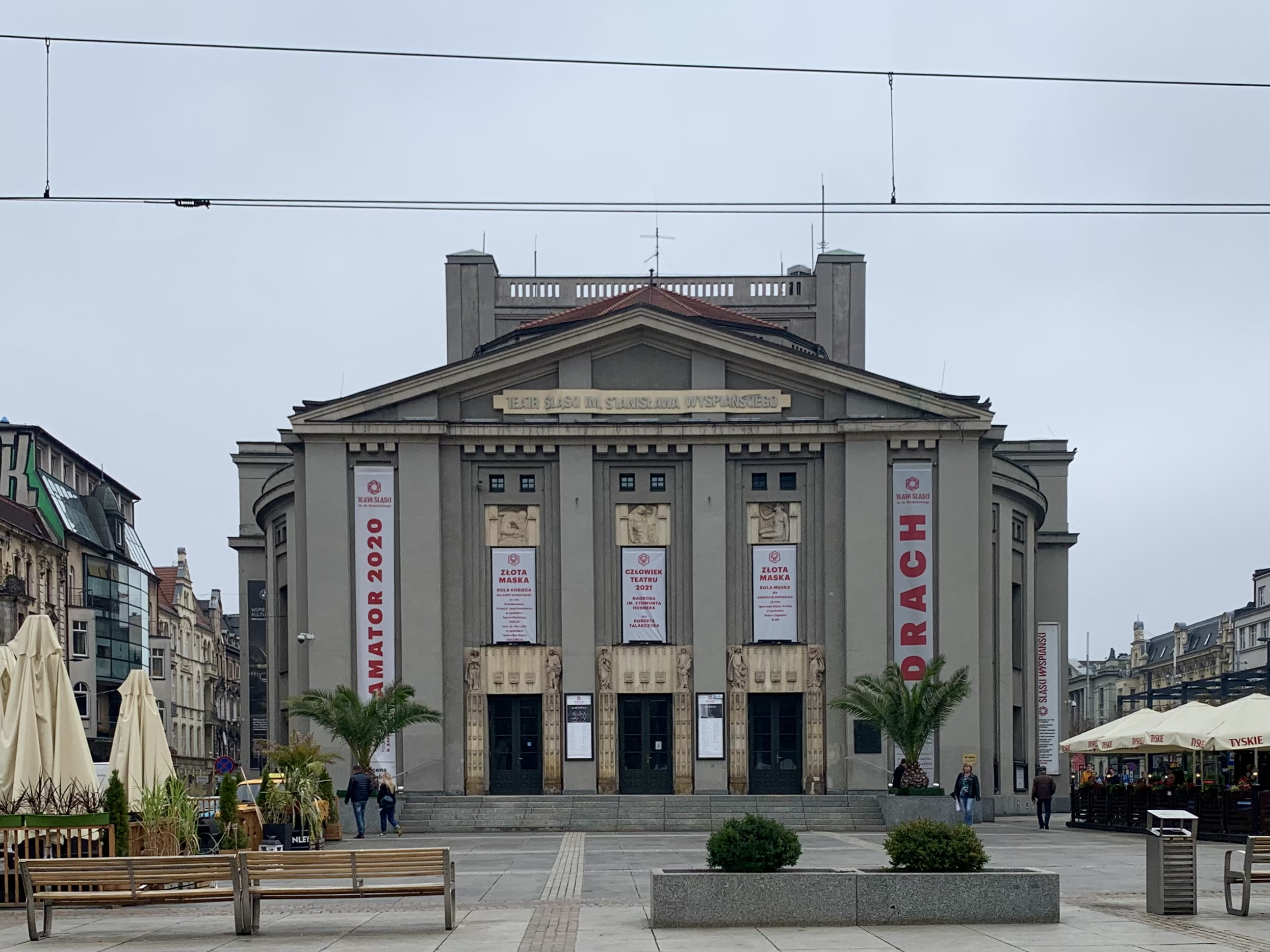
Building of the Silesian Theatre (2 Market Square)

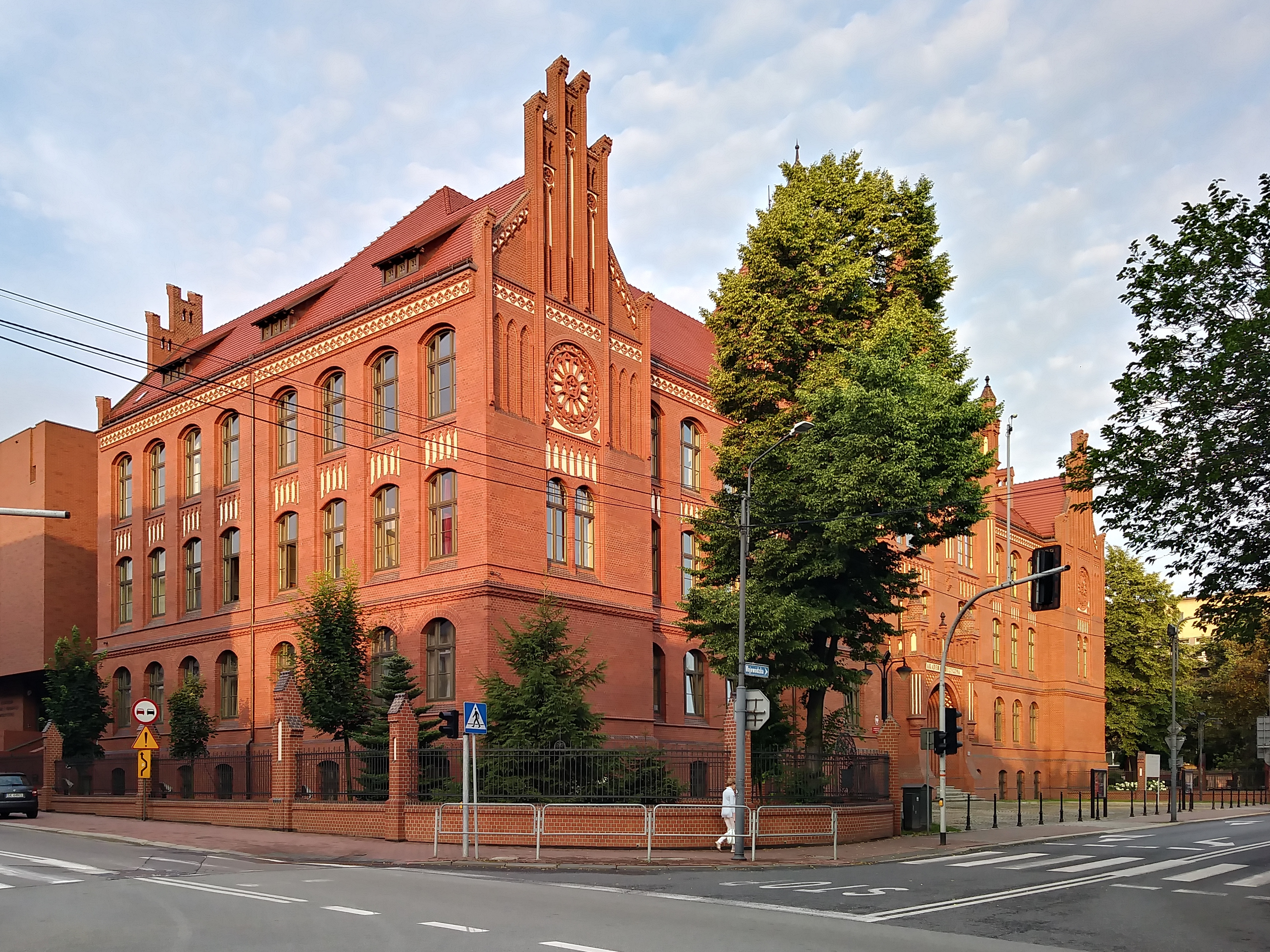
Building of the Karol Szymanowski Academy of Music at 33 Wojewódzka Street (2018)

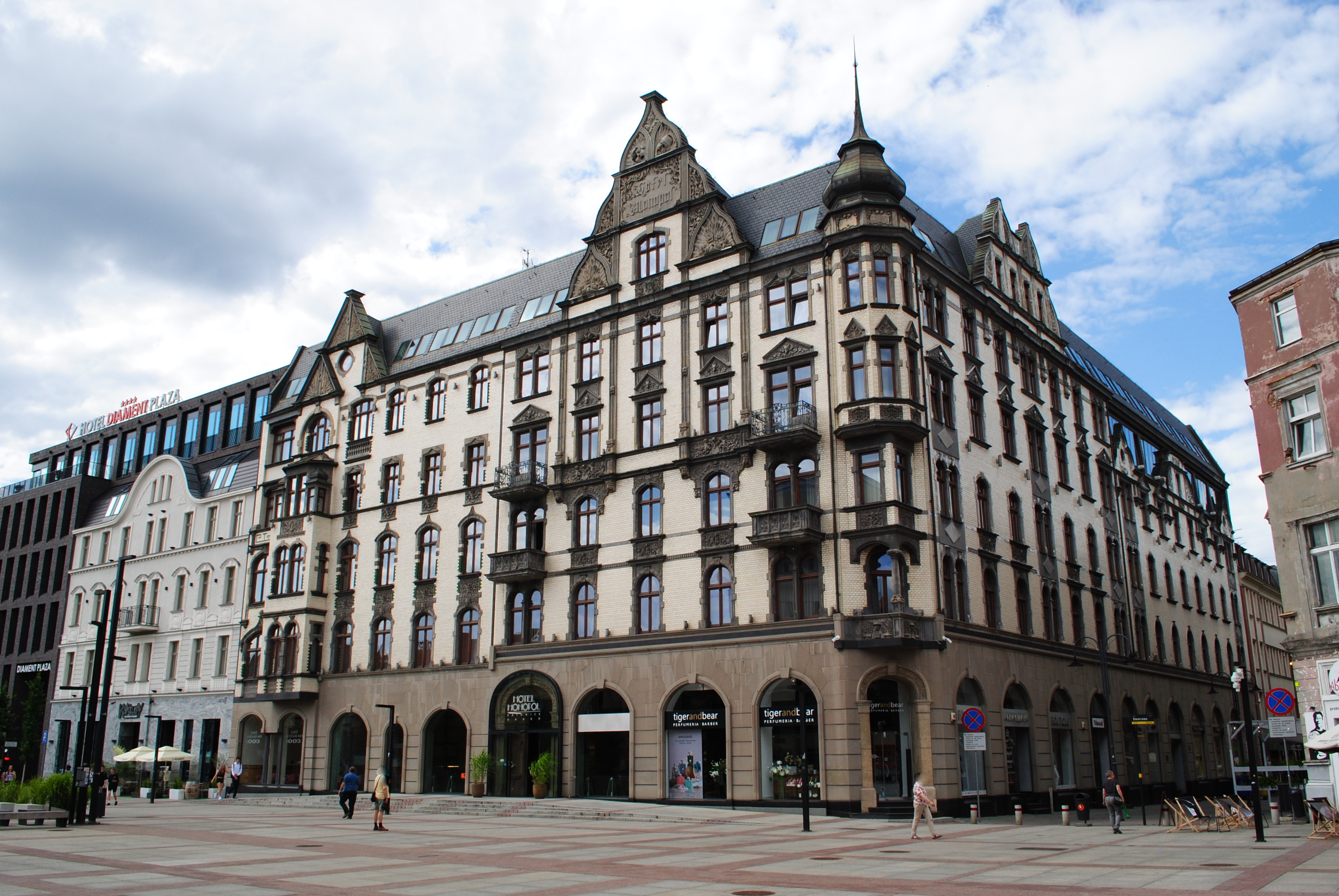
Monopol Hotel (5 Dworcowa Street)

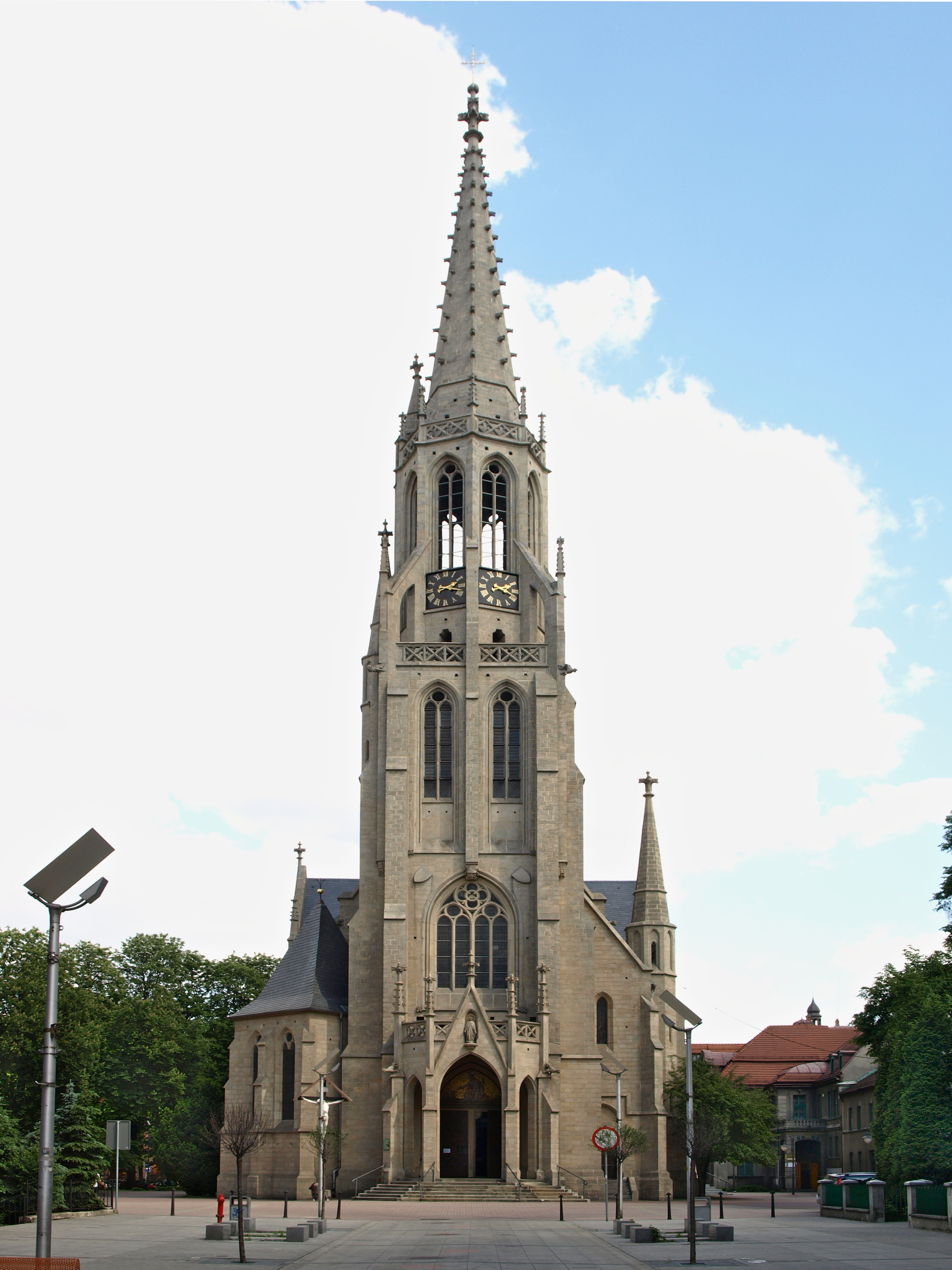
St. Mary's Church from Mariacka Street (2012)

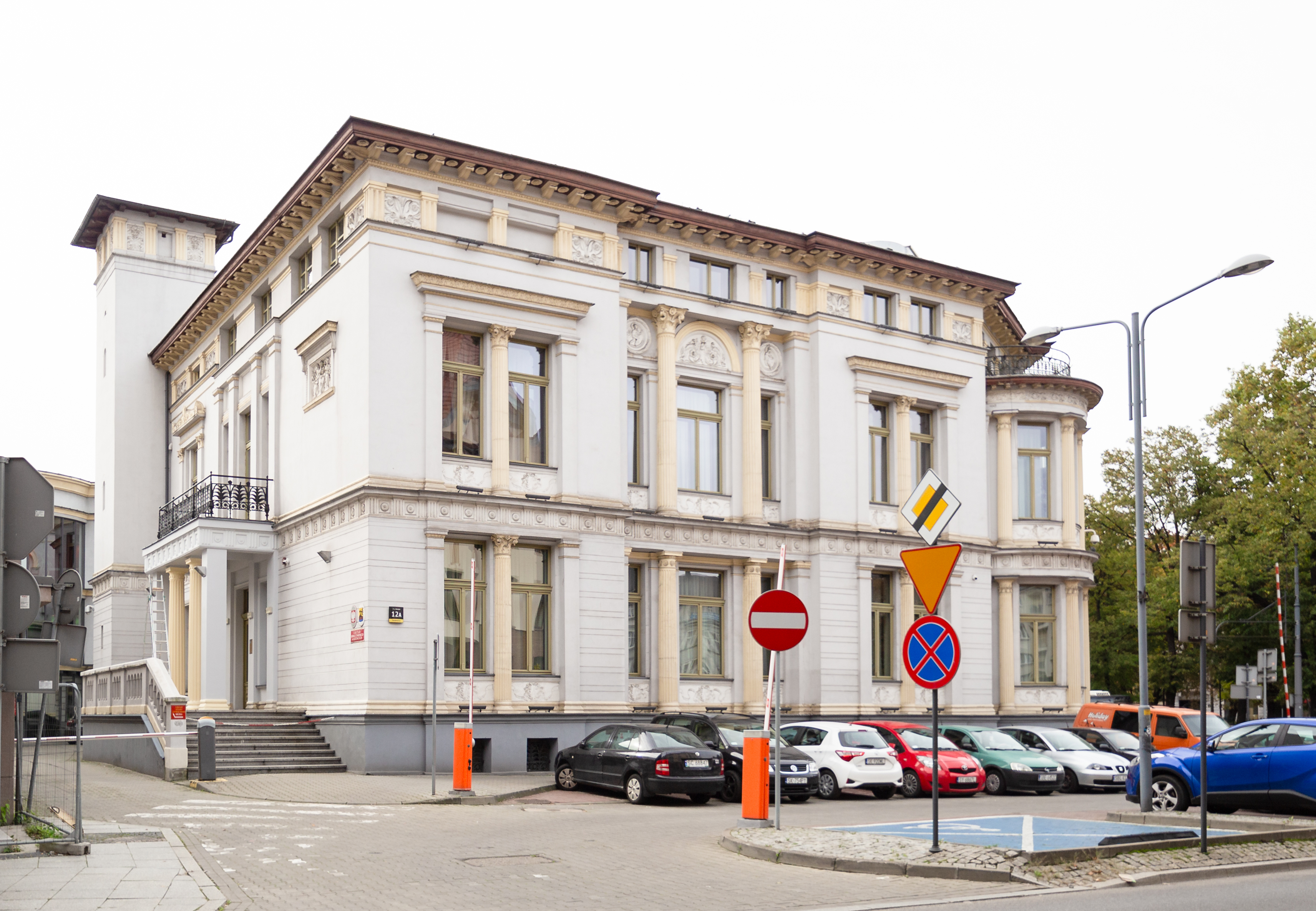
Goldstein Palace at 12a Freedom Square (2023)

==== Selected pre-war architectural monuments of Katowice ====
- Building of the Silesian Philharmonic (2 Sokolska Street) – built between 1873 and 1874 in the historicist and Classical styles. Modernized between 2010 and 2014, it remains the oldest concert hall in Katowice;
- Building of the Adam Mickiewicz High School (11 Adam Mickiewicz Street) – seat of the Adam Mickiewicz High School, built between 1898 and 1900 in the Gothic Revival style with elements of German Renaissance Revival. This three-story red-brick structure features a prominent tower with a tented roof. Characteristic elements include a tripartite portal and a circular rose window illuminating the auditorium on the second floor;
- Building of the Maria Skłodowska-Curie High School (42 3 Maja Street/35 Juliusz Słowacki Street) – seat of the Maria Skłodowska-Curie High School with bilingual departments, constructed between 1872 and 1873 and extended in 1908 (or 1910) in the historicist, modernist, and Renaissance Revival styles. The older section is a two-story L-shaped structure with a basement at the corner of 3 Maja and J. Słowacki streets. The newer part comprises a multi-volume complex with a three-story block facing 3 Maja Street, a five-story inner block, and a prominent tower;
- Building of the Municipal Bath (5 A. Mickiewicz Street) – built between 1894 and 1895 in brick historicist style and reconstructed between 1997 and 1999. It consists of two volumes: a three-story front section originally housing baths, a hairdresser, and a Roman bath, with a lower rear section containing a swimming pool;
- Building of the Silesian Theatre (2 Market Square) – built between 1906 and 1907 to a design by Carl Moritz in the Neoclassical style. It features a tripartite volume comprising a cubic block with vestibule and staircase, a horseshoe-shaped auditorium with long galleries, and a stage block formed by two rectangular volumes. The elevation is articulated by lesenes, balanced by window panels,
- Building of the Karol Szymanowski Academy of Music (33 Wojewódzka Street) – built between 1898 and 1901 in the Gothic Revival style. This compact three-story structure has a basement and attic under a high roof. The façade is accentuated by gables with pinnacles, blind tracery, and avant-corps; the top features a mosaic coat of arms of Katowice;
- Former Grand Hotel building (3 W. Korfanty Avenue) – built between 1898 and 1899 to a design by Gerd Zimmermann in the historicist style. This four-story structure with an attic has a bossaged ground floor. Originally, the tympanum was adorned with two figures, and the southern avant-corps featured a terrace,
- Former Reichsbank building (5 Bankowa Street) – built in 1911 (or between 1911 and 1912) to a design by Julius Habicht, on a rectangular plan. The ground floor originally housed the bank's operating hall, and the seven-bay façade is articulated by paired pilasters;
- Building of the District Court (10 Freedom Square) – originally a garden villa, built between 1907 and 1909 in eclectic style;
- Monopol Hotel (2 Dyrekcyjna Street/5–7 Dworcowa Street) – dating to 1902 in eclectic style, comprises three wings and a patio. The front elevations are faced with white clinker brick, featuring frieze ornaments below windows and attic decorations. The higher southern attic bears a reconstructed "Hotel Monopol" inscription and two shouting masks;
- Burgher tenements – including those at 3 Dyrekcyjna Street, 10 Dyrekcyjna Street, 6 St. John Street, 6–8 3 Maja Street, 13 3 Maja Street, 18 3 Maja Street, 40 3 Maja Street, 10 Mariacka Street, 8 A. Mickiewicz Street, 22 Mickiewicz Street, 2 Młyńska Street, 24 J. Słowacki Street, 13 Stawowa Street, and 1 Warszawska Street, as well as 2 Freedom Square,
- Rialto Cinema Theatre (24 St. John Street) – built in 1912 in classicizing style to a design by Martin Tichauer. It is a three-storey structure. The façade features pilasters and a triangular pediment, with a relief of a Roman quadriga above the entrance;
- St. Mary's Church (Fr. E. Szramek Square) – built between 1862 and 1870 to a design by Alexis Langer in the Gothic Revival style. This stone-clad, oriented church has a three-nave basilican body with a 71-meter tower on the axis;
- Church of Saints Peter and Paul (Mikołowska Street) – built between 1898 and 1902 in the Gothic Revival style to a design by Joseph Ebers. It features a three-nave hall covered by transverse tented roofs;
- Church of the Resurrection (Warszawska Street) – built between 1856 and 1858 to a design by Richard Lucae in the round-arch style, expanded in 1888 and between 1899 and 1902. This oriented church is crowned by a large quadrangular tower with lateral transept arms; the entrance is adorned by a rose window,
- Palace of brothers Abraham and Joseph Goldstein (12a Freedom Square) – completed in 1875 in Neoclassical style. It is a two-story structure whose front elevations are linked by a semicircular avant-corps. It features a socle, a rusticated ground floor with a prominent inter-story cornice, and elevations decorated with rich molding and stone ornamentation;
- Old railway station (2–10 Dworcowa Street/20 St. John Street) – commissioned in 1859 with the opening of the line connecting Katowice to the Warsaw–Vienna railway via Sosnowiec. It was the largest structure in Katowice before the town received city rights. Originally comprising a station hall and forwarding offices. It was extended in 1906;
- Paul Frantzioch Villa (also known as Wojciech Korfanty's villa; 23 Powstańców Street) – dating from around 1908 and designed by the owner in the Landhausstil. It features an asymmetrical, articulated plan and irregular volume with varied elevations incorporating half-timbered decoration and a high gable roof;
- Heinrich Gerdes Villa (42 Wojewódzka Street) – built in 1896 to a design by Felix Schuster in northern Renaissance Revival style. It is characterized by its free plan and asymmetrical four-bay elevation with a central avant-corps crowned by a tower under a high hip roof with a ridge turret,
- Ignatz Grünfeld Villa (12 Warszawska Street) – erected in 1869 to the owner's design in Neoclassical style. It consists of two volumes, the larger being the villa on a square plan. After World War II, it was rebuilt while preserving the original articulation and volume;
- Julius Haase Villa (42 Warszawska Street) – dating from around 1870 and designed by the owner in Renaissance Revival style. It L-shaped in plan with an entrance from the courtyard side and a flattened roof. The street façade is accentuated by flat divisions forming a two-bay central avant-corps;
- Von Kramst family villa (37 Warszawska Street) – constructed in 1876 to a design by Julius Haase in Neoclassical style. It has a central plan with a prominent socle, rusticated rusticated ground-floor wall, encircling cornices, and a strongly projecting roof eaves;
- Complex of Regional Court buildings (16–18 Andrzeja Street) – comprises the old court building erected between 1888 and 1891 with features of eclectic and German Renaissance Revival elements. The first is a four-story structure with basement and attic under a gabled roof with decorative finials. The second is a four-story clinker brick building with elevations rendered in sandstone-colored plasterwork and two avant-corps with colonnades. The complex adjoins the detention facility buildings at 10–14 Mikołowska Street.

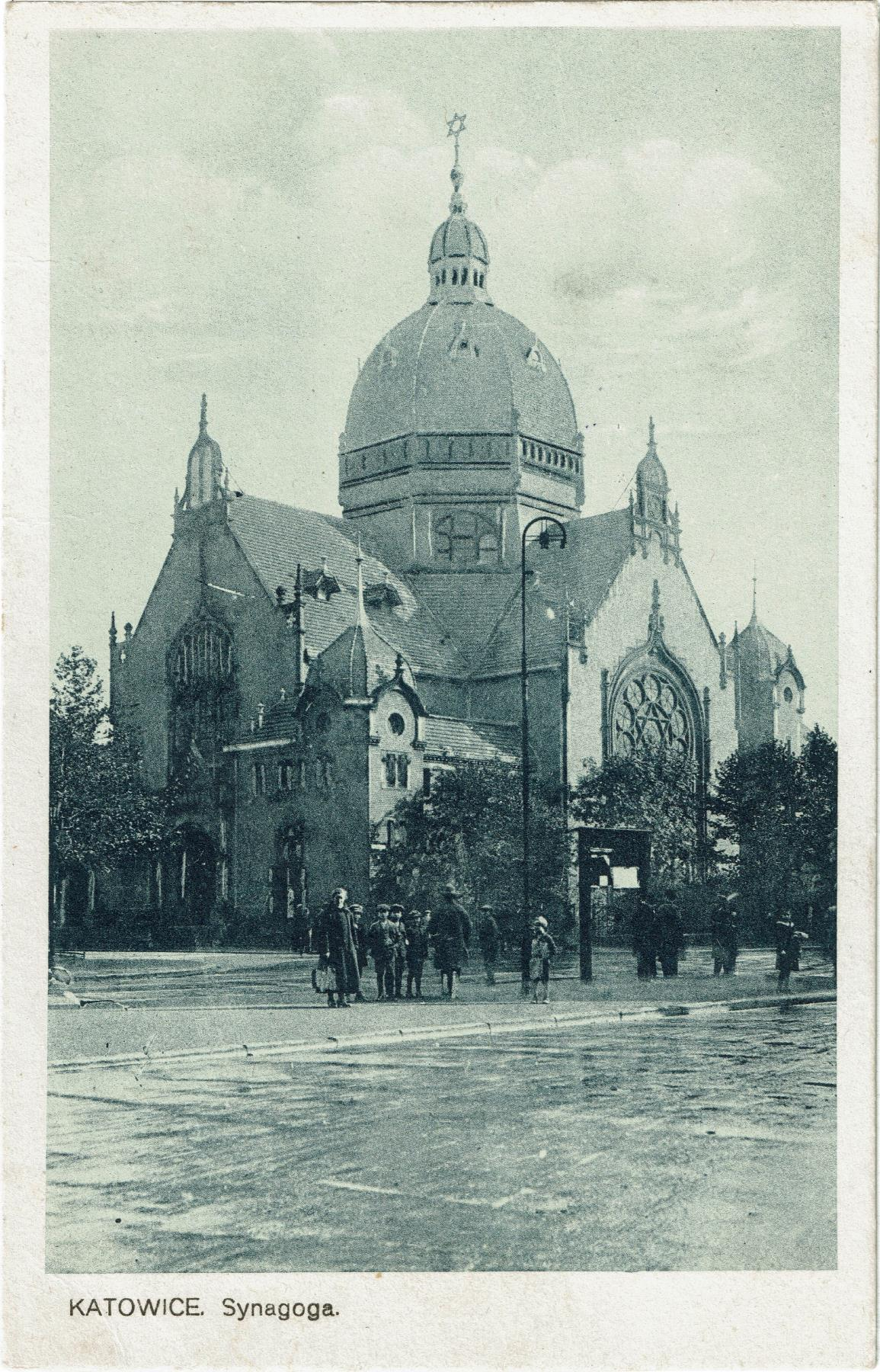
Great Synagogue in a photograph from the interwar period

==== Selected non-existent buildings ====
- Tiele-Winckler Manor (60 W. Korfanty Avenue) – likely built in 1841 in Classical style. This villa underwent multiple modernizations over time and was demolished in 1976;
- Welt Hotel (12 Market Square) – dating to 1848 in Neoclassical style. This two-story building burned down in a fire in January 1945; in its place, the Zenit department store was built in the 1960s;
- Katowice Inn – from around 1816. Located at the intersection of the main communication routes in what was then the village of Katowice, it stood out among the surrounding buildings due to its high roof covered with wood shingles;
- Old Synagogue (3 Maja Street/J. Słowacki Street) – constructed between 1861 and 1862 in the Romanesque Revival style to a design by Ignatz Grünfeld. It was enlarged between 1882 and 1883 with a transverse nave topped by a dome and flèche. A corner tenement was later built on the site;
- Great Synagogue (9 A. Mickiewicz Street) – built between 1896 and 1900 in the Moorish Revival and Gothic Revival styles. The main hall was surmounted by a dome with a roof lantern and Star of David. It was set on fire by the Germans on 8 September 1939; after World War II, the site was converted into a green area and, in the 1990s, into a marketplace;
- Friedrich Wilhelm Grundmann Villa (20 Warszawska Street) – built between 1868 and 1869 (or in 1864) by builder Claus Häusler and expanded in 1872. It existed until 1972. The villa originally displayed Classical architectural features, taking on more Romantic forms after the extension through the addition of Italian Renaissance elements and typical 19th-century architectural forms;
- Dr. Richard Holtze Villa (31 Warszawska Street/2 Francuska Street) – constructed before 1855 in Neoclassical style. This brick, one-story structure referenced residential architecture from the first half of the 19th century in the Berlin and Potsdam areas. In its place, an Art Nouveau tenement was built in 1902 at 31 Warszawska Street, featuring a relief depicting Dr. Richard Holtze.

=== Other parts of the city ===
At the time Katowice was granted town privileges, the character of the surrounding settlements was also changing. Rural buildings quickly gave way to tenements and structures for workers at nearby industrial plants, although the areas of Brynów, Ligota, Piotrowice, Ochojec, and Panewniki still retained a rural character at that time. From the mid-19th century, workers' housing estates began to be built near mines and steelworks. In Bogucice, workers' colonies emerged around the Ferdinand and Agnes-Amanda coal mines; in Zawodzie along 1 Maja Street; in Dąb along Chorzowska Street; and in Załęże, a colony near the Kleofas mine as well as the Hegenscheidt colony near the Baildon Steelworks. In the area of the Wujek Coal Mine in Załęska Hałda and Katowicka Hałda, an officials' colony was built along what is now Mikołowska Street, along with a workers' colony designed by Bruno Taut. In Giszowiec and Nikiszowiec, two company towns designed by Georg and Emil Zillmann from Charlottenburg were built for workers of the Giesche mine.

Monumental structures were also erected outside the boundaries of Katowice at the time. In Panewniki, construction of a large Franciscan monastery complex with a church in Romanesque Revival style, designed by Mansuetus Fromm, began in 1905; in Zawodzie, a Neoclassical town hall for Gmina Bogucice; and in Załęże a Gothic Revival Church of St. Joseph.

Pre-World War II architectural monuments in the remaining parts and districts of present-day Katowice include:

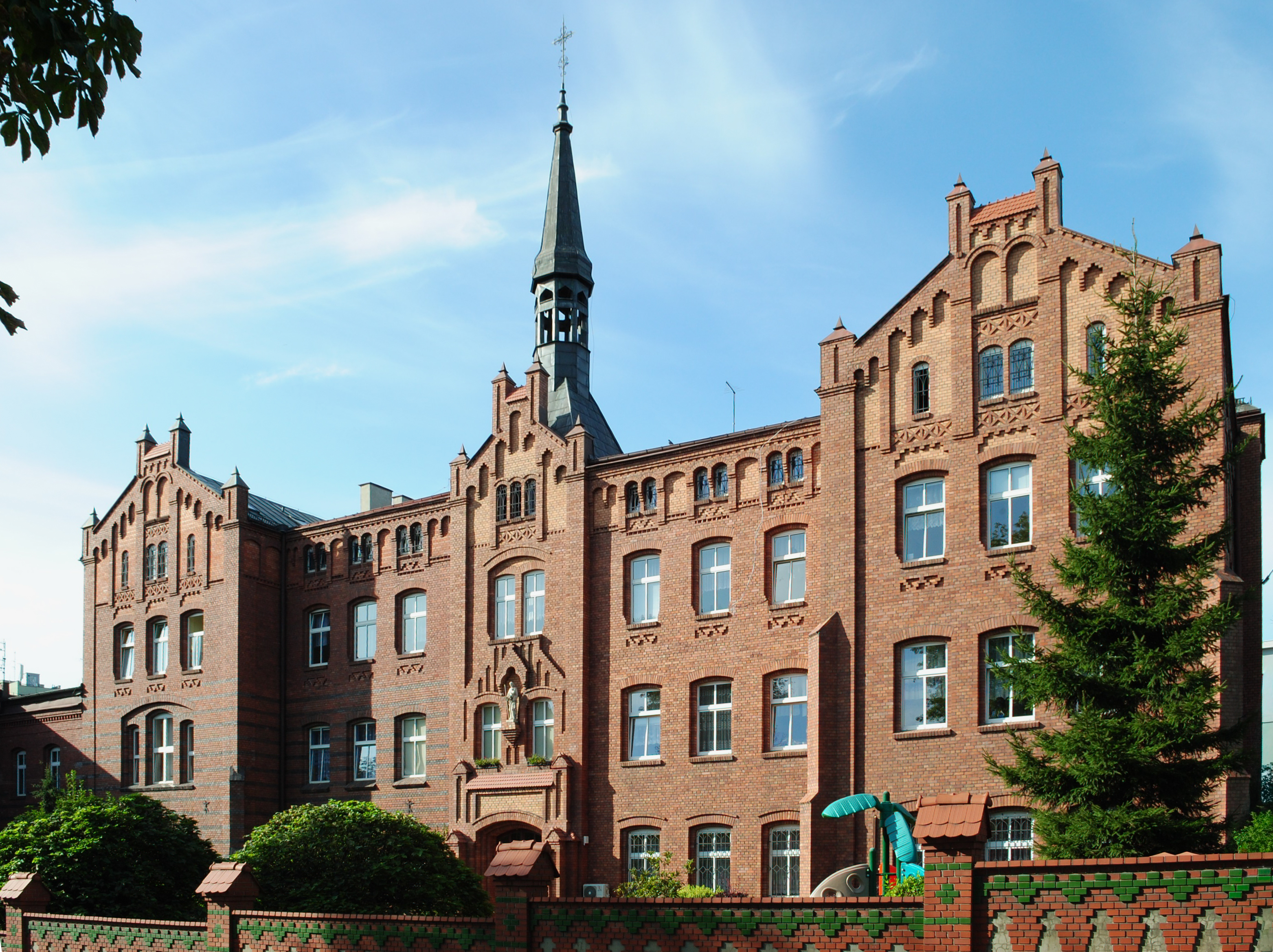
Headquarters of the Congregation of the Sisters of St. Hedwig (1–3 Leopolda Street)

==== Bogucice and Zawodzie ====
- Residential tenements and familoks – primarily from the 19th and 20th centuries, including examples along 1 Maja, Father Leopold Markiefka, Katowicka, and Ludwika streets;
- St. Stephen's Church (Father L. Markiefka Street) – constructed between 1892 and 1894 in Gothic Revival style to a design by Paul Jackisch. This three-nave structure features a choir closed on three sides and a single tower at the entrance façade;
- Town hall of Gmina Bogucice (50 1 Maja Street) – erected between 1911 and 1912 to a design by Arnold Hartmann. The building was planned with three main wings; the first floor originally housed a meeting hall articulated by paired pilasters separating semicircular niches with doorways;
- Headquarters of the Congregation of the Sisters of St. Hedwig (1–3 Leopolda Street) – dating to 1851 and 1931 in historicist and modernist styles;
- Buildings of the Katowice coal mine (6 Kopalniana Street) – built between 1883 and 1895, as well as between 1921 and 1928 in historicist and Gothic Revival styles. The complex includes, among others, a power plant, compressor hall, engine house of the Bartosz shaft, and headframe with tower;
- Complex of the Bonifratres Convent and Brothers Hospitallers of Saint John of God (85–87 Father L. Markiefka Street) – the oldest building of the complex was completed in 1874, with a newer one in 1903, constructed in historicist, modernist, and, and Gothic Revival styles. These brick structures have modest elevations enlivened by bands of glazed brick and central avant-corps.

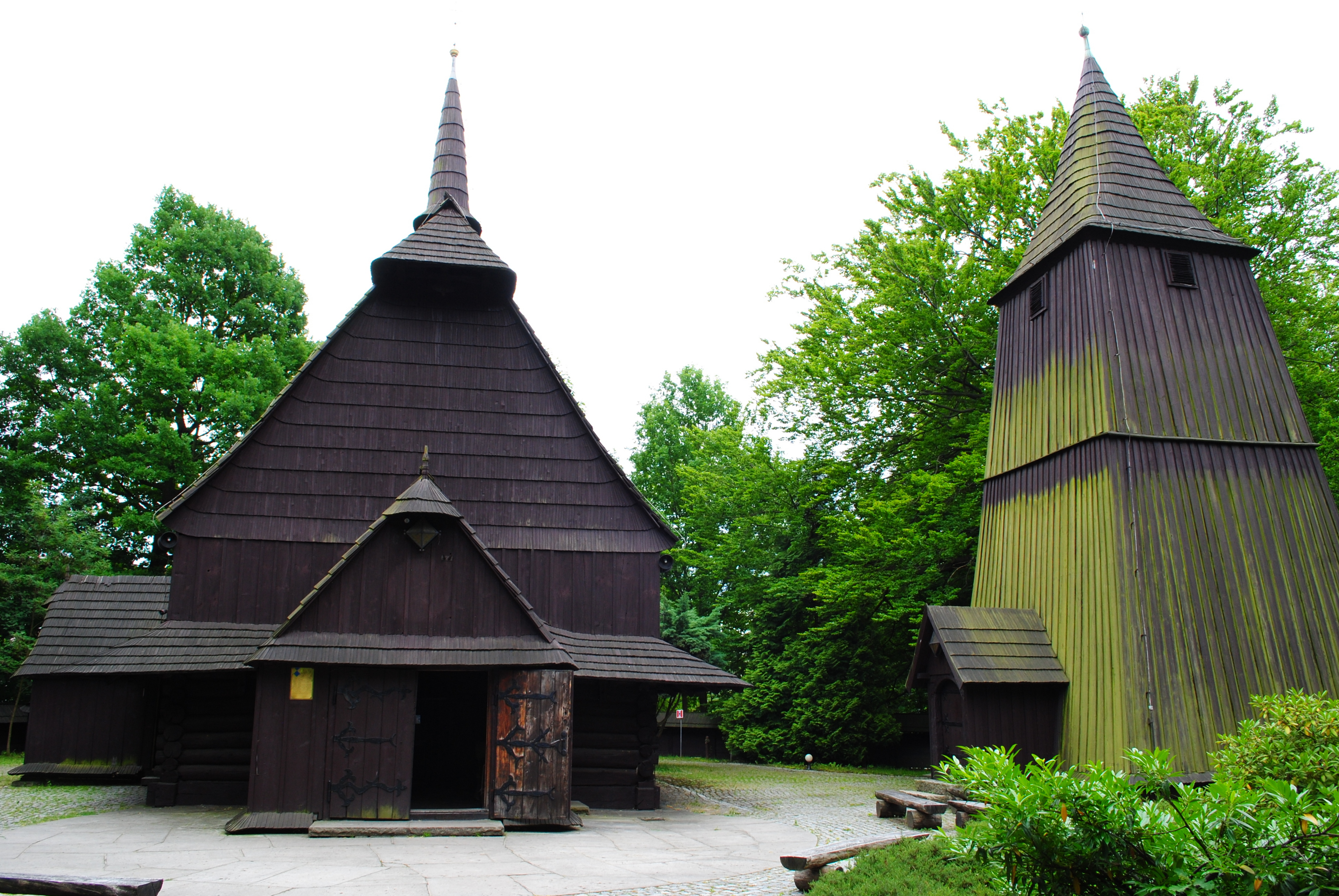
Church of St. Michael the Archangel in Kościuszko Park (2021)

==== Brynów ====
- Church of St. Michael the Archangel (Tadeusz Kościuszko Street) – a 16th-century wooden church relocated from Syrynia, includes an associated bell tower and enclosing fence;
- Kościuszko Park (T. Kościuszko Street) – laid out in the early 20th century, protected for its spatial composition and vegetation, together with the Parachute Tower, monument of Tadeusz Kościuszko, minor architectural elements, and Soviet soldiers' cemetery;
- Buildings of the Wujek Coal Mine (40 Wincenty Pol Street) – constructed between 1902 and 1912 in brick historicist style, encompass the Krakus shaft, headframe with extraction tower, workshops, storage buildings, and the administrative and lamp room structure.

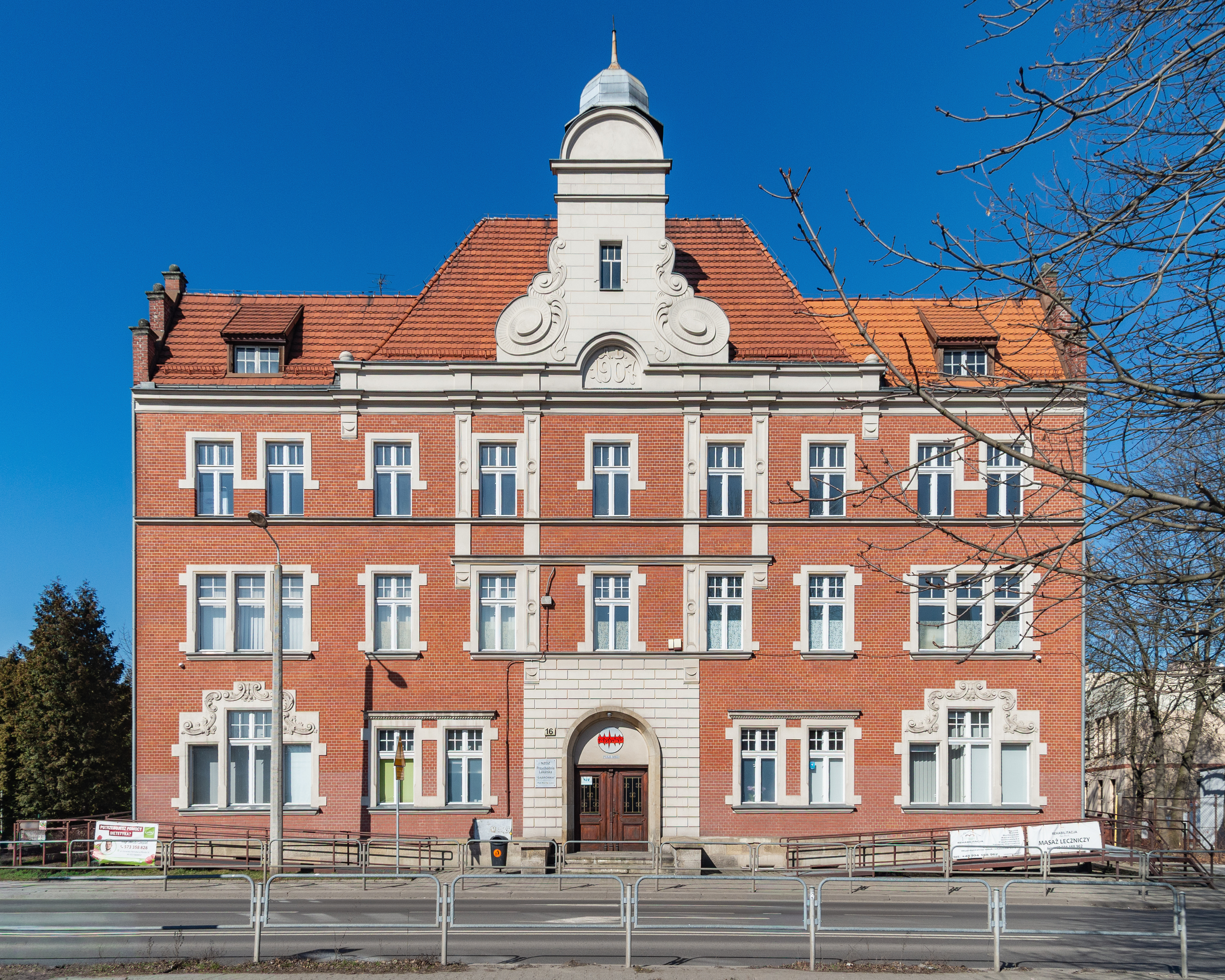
Town hall of Gmina Dąbrówka Mała at Henryk Le Rond Street 16 (2020)

==== Dąbrówka Mała ====
- Katowice Dąbrówka Mała railway station (2 Independence Avenue) – constructed in the 1890s in historicist style;
- Tiele-Winckler estate (1–2 Żyzna Street) – dating from the 1890s. It comprises a residential building, outbuilding, surrounding grounds, and a horse chestnut avenue;
- Residential tenements and familoks – including along Strzelców Bytomskich Street, Pod Młynem Street, J. Grzegorzek Street, Siemianowicka Street, Henryk Le Rond Street, H. Dobrzański "Hubal" Street, R. Piter Street, and Independence Avenue; mainly from the second half of the 19th century;
- Church of St. Anthony of Padua (4 Independence Avenue) – built in 1912 in Baroque Revival style to a design by Johannes Franziskus Klomp. It features a broad main nave flanked by shallow apsidal chapels;
- Town hall of Gmina Dąbrówka Mała (16 Henryk Le Rond Street) – erected in 1907 in a style combining elements of Art Nouveau, modernism, and eclecticism. This three-story structure with basement and attic includes a distinctive turret with tented roof and mast, as well as a portal with an inscription "A.D. 1907";
- Former mill complex (31 Pod Młynem Street) – dating from the turn of the 19th and 20th centuries.

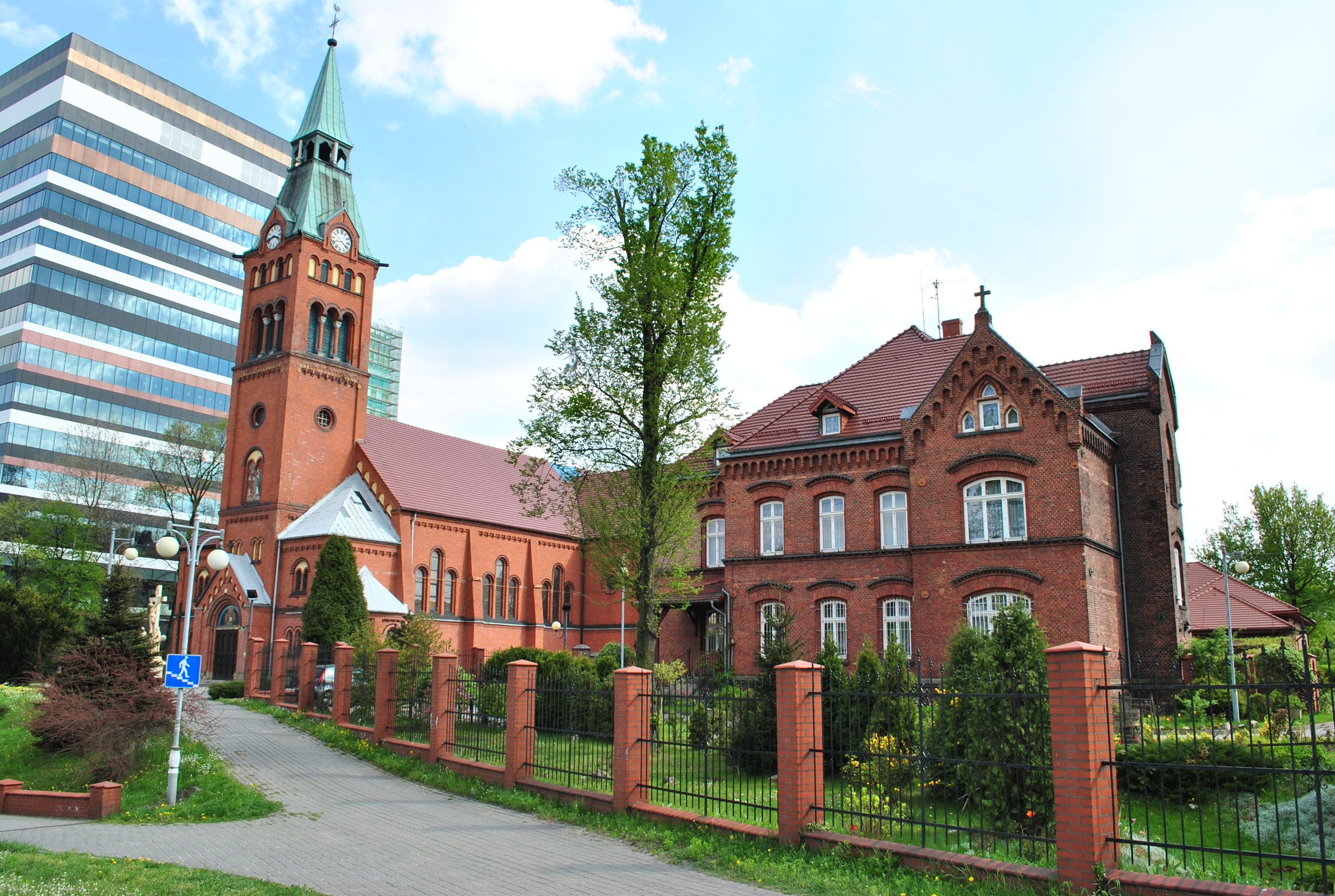
Church of Saints John and Paul (2015)

==== Dąb ====
- Tenements, familoks, and residential houses – including at Dębowa Street, Krzyżowa Street, and Złota Street;
- Church of Saints John and Paul (Chorzowska Street) – constructed between 1901 and 1902 in Romanesque Revival style to a design by Ludwig Schneider. The building has a proportionate volume with a transept, semicircular apse, and a single tower on the north side preceded by a church porch;
- Buildings of the Gottwald mine (109 Chorzowska Street) – in brick historicist style, comprising the 1906 Jerzy shaft extraction tower, the 1920 Jerzy shaft engine house (adapted as the Chapel of Saint Barbara), and the 1905–1907 administration and bathhouse building.

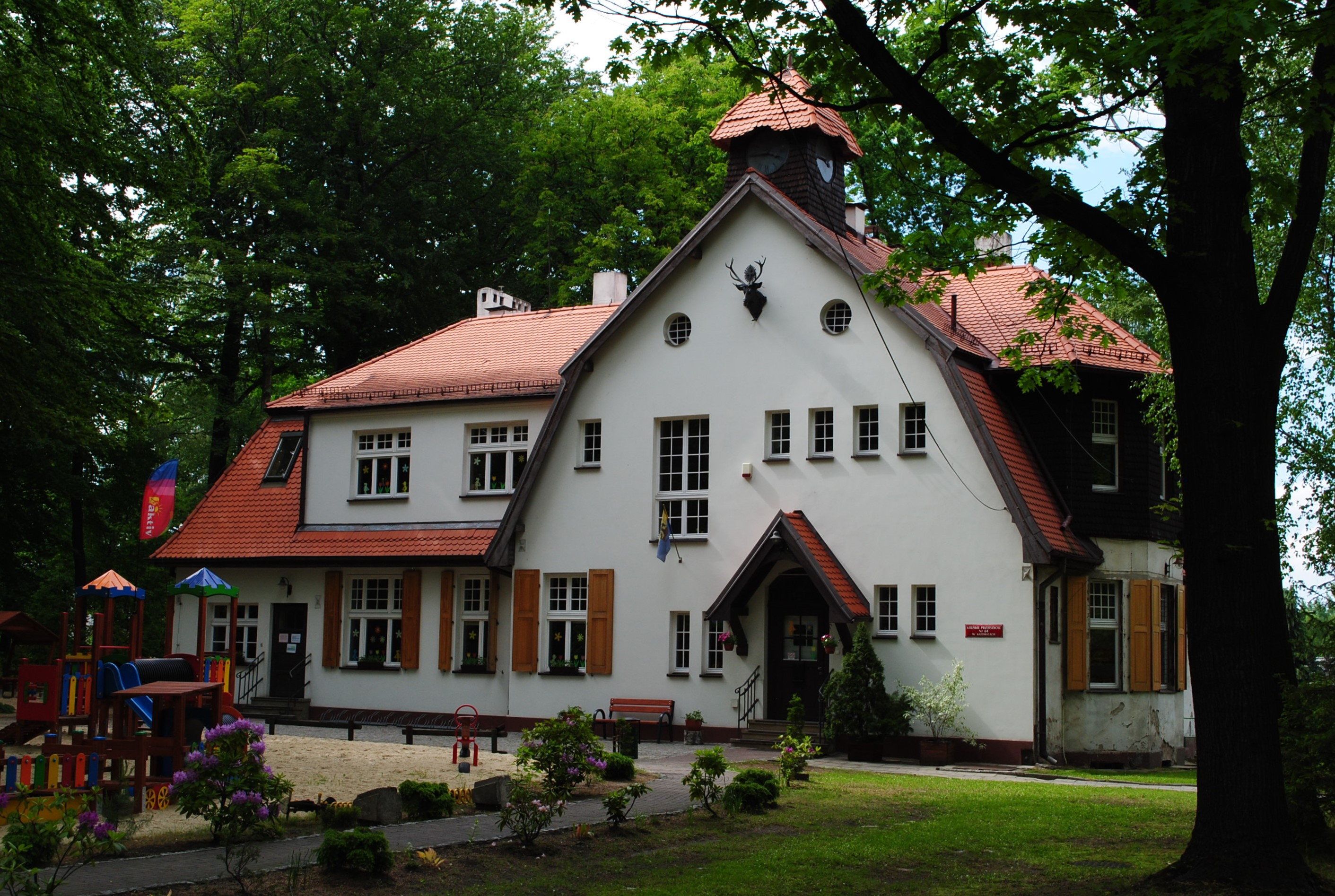
Forester's house in Giszowiec

==== Giszowiec ====
- Giszowiec company town – erected between 1907 and 1910 on the initiative of Anton Uthemann director of the Giesche mine (later Wieczorek). It embodies the garden city urban concept, enclosed within the quadrangle formed by Pszczyńska Street, Górniczego Stanu Street, Pod Kasztanami Street, and Mysłowicka Street. The central square is surrounded by public utility buildings, including the forester's house, inn, cooperative store, and Catholic school;
- Water tower (Pszczyńska Street) – constructed between 1907 and 1914;
- Villa of the director of the Giesche mine (10 Pszczyńska Street) – built between 1907 and 1910.

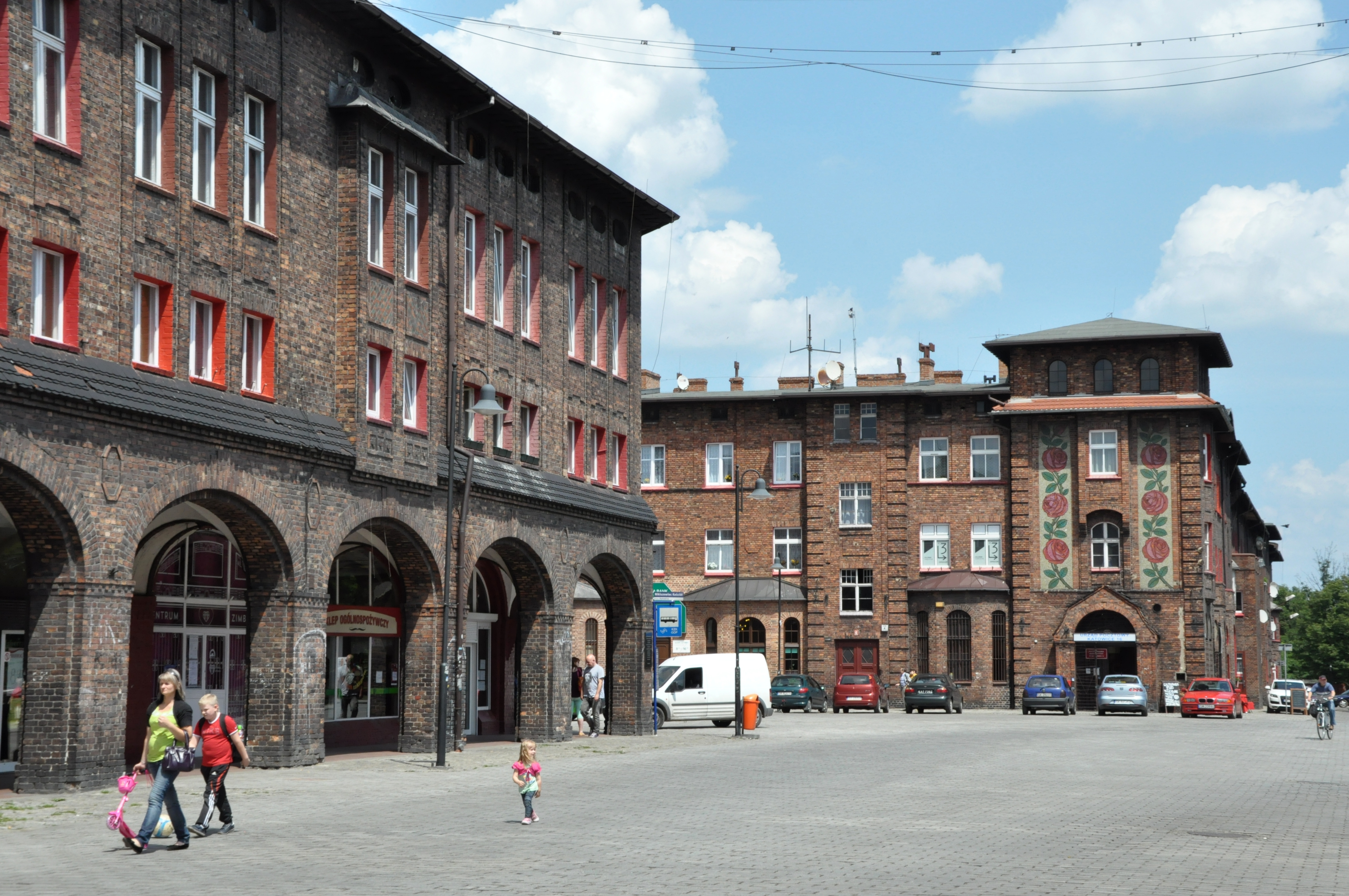
Fragment of Nikiszowiec (2014)

==== Janów-Nikiszowiec ====
- Tenements, familoks, and residential houses in Janów – including at Oswobodzenia Street, Teofil Ociepka Street, Grodowa Street, Leśnego Potoku Street, and Zamkowa Street; mainly from the turn of the 19th and 20th centuries;
- Classicist sculpture (Emil and Georg Zillmann Square) – dating to 1835 and funded by Aleksander Mieroszewski. Originally placed near the Mieroszewski manor house;
- Nikiszowiec company town – developed in two phases between 1908 and 1927. It consists of nine blocks of red-brick houses connected by characteristic arched gateways. The estate was complemented by public facilities, including shops, two schools, a hospital, restaurants, a police station with detention cells, bathhouse, laundry, and the Church of St. Anne. The estate was linked to Giszowiec by a narrow-gauge railway colloquially known as the "Balkan";
- Buildings of the Wieczorek mine – Pułaski and Poniatowski shafts (Szopienicka Street) – the Pułaski shaft complex includes the headframe with extraction tower, sorting plant, engine house, mechanical workshops, carpentry shop, bathhouse with lamp room, and electrical converters. The Poniatowski shaft complex comprises a 1908 workshop in historicist style and a 1908 engine house ensemble, also in historicist style.

==== Kostuchna ====
- Boże Dary workers' colony (area of Tadeusz Boy-Żeleński Street) – dating from the early 20th century, including a dormitory building;
- Residential buildings – including along Tadeusz Boy-Żeleński Street, Szarych Szeregów Street, and Armii Krajowej Street;
- Building complex of the Boże Dary mine (Tadeusz Boy-Żeleński Street) – constructed in the early 20th century in historicist and Gothic Revival styles. It comprises the administration building, boiler houses, offices and shaft workshops, electrical substation, turbine house, and office and lamp room building.

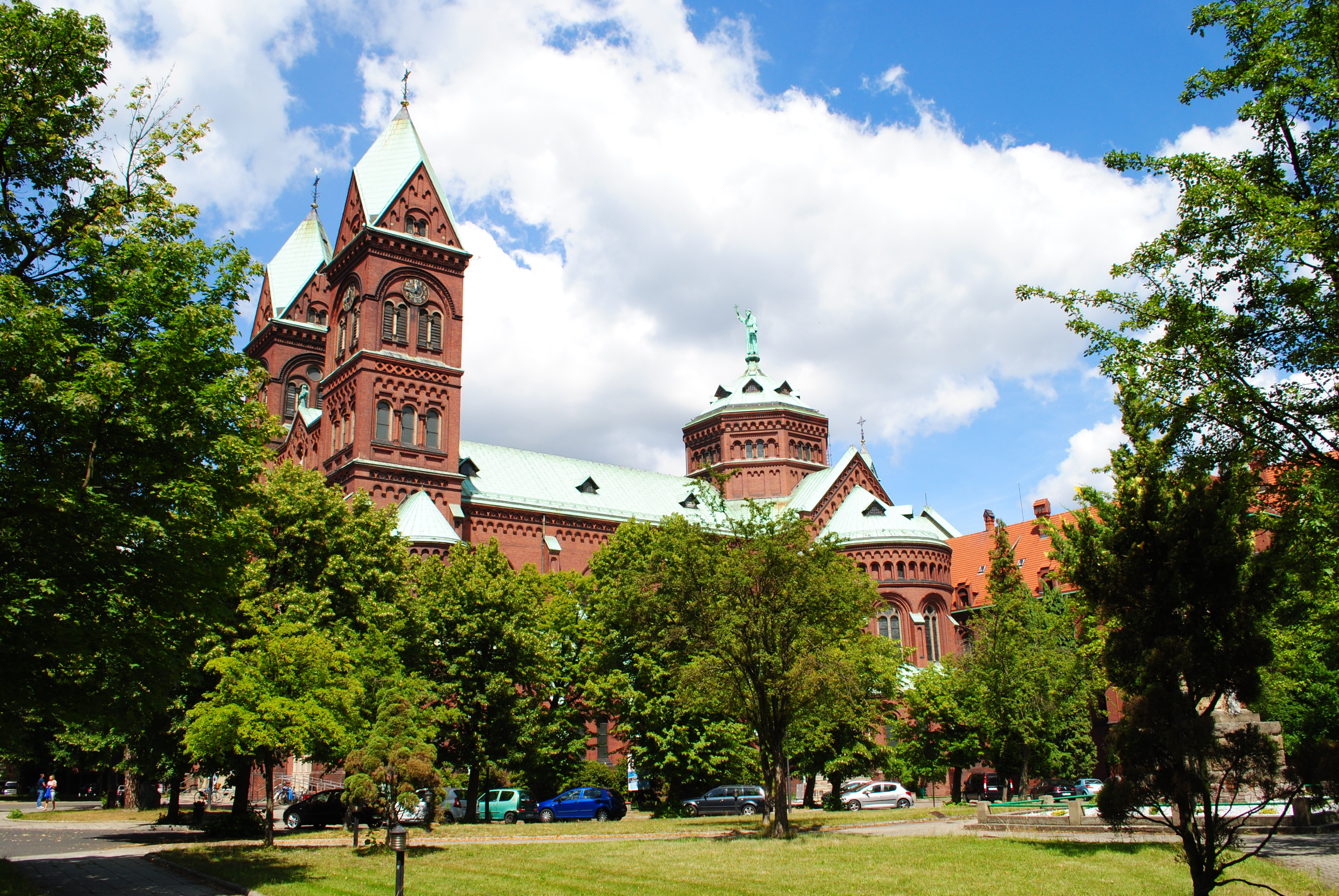
Basilica of St. Louis IX and Assumption of Mary from Monastery Square (2022)

==== Ligota-Panewniki ====
- Franciscan monastery complex with basilica and Kalwaria Panewnicka (76 Panewnicka Street) – built in Romanesque Revival style between 1905 and 1908 to a design by Mansuetus Fromm. The church itself is laid out on a Latin cross plan and features a characteristic rose window at the entrance and a bronze statue of St. Francis of Assisi on the dome;
- Town hall of Gmina Ligota (83 Piotrowicka Street) – dating from the first quarter of the 20th century in modernist style.

==== Murcki ====
- Villa of the Dukes of Pszczyna (1 Bielska Street) – built around 1905;
- Murcki settlement building complex (including Bielska Street, J. Samsonowicz Street, K.K. Baczyński Street, Freedom Street, andJan Kasprowicz Street) – primarily from the early 20th century in modernist style, incorporating facilities such as a cooperative store.

==== Piotrowice-Ochojec ====
- Historic buildings in Piotrowice and Ochojec – mainly from the early 20th century, located in areas including Armii Krajowej Street, Zygmunt Walter-Janke Street, Bolesław Prus Street, Father Stanisław Wilczewski Street, and Wojska Polskiego Street.

==== Podlesie and Zarzecze ====
- 19th-century rural buildings – in areas including Armii Krajowej Street, Stefan Grot-Rowecki Street, and Uniczowska Street;
- Bridge over Mleczna river (Zaopusta Street).

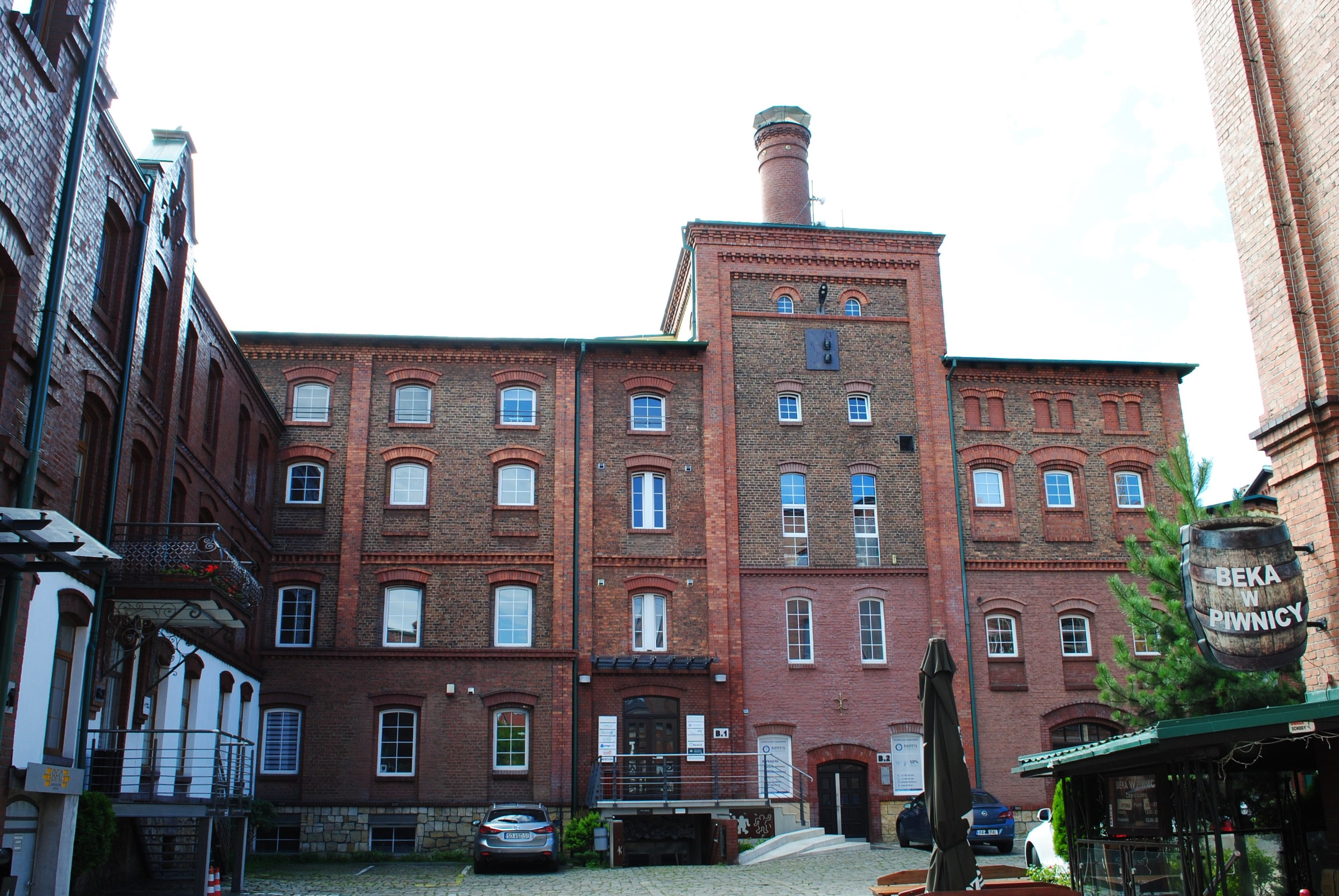
Mokrski brothers brewery buildings (8 H. Bednorz Street)

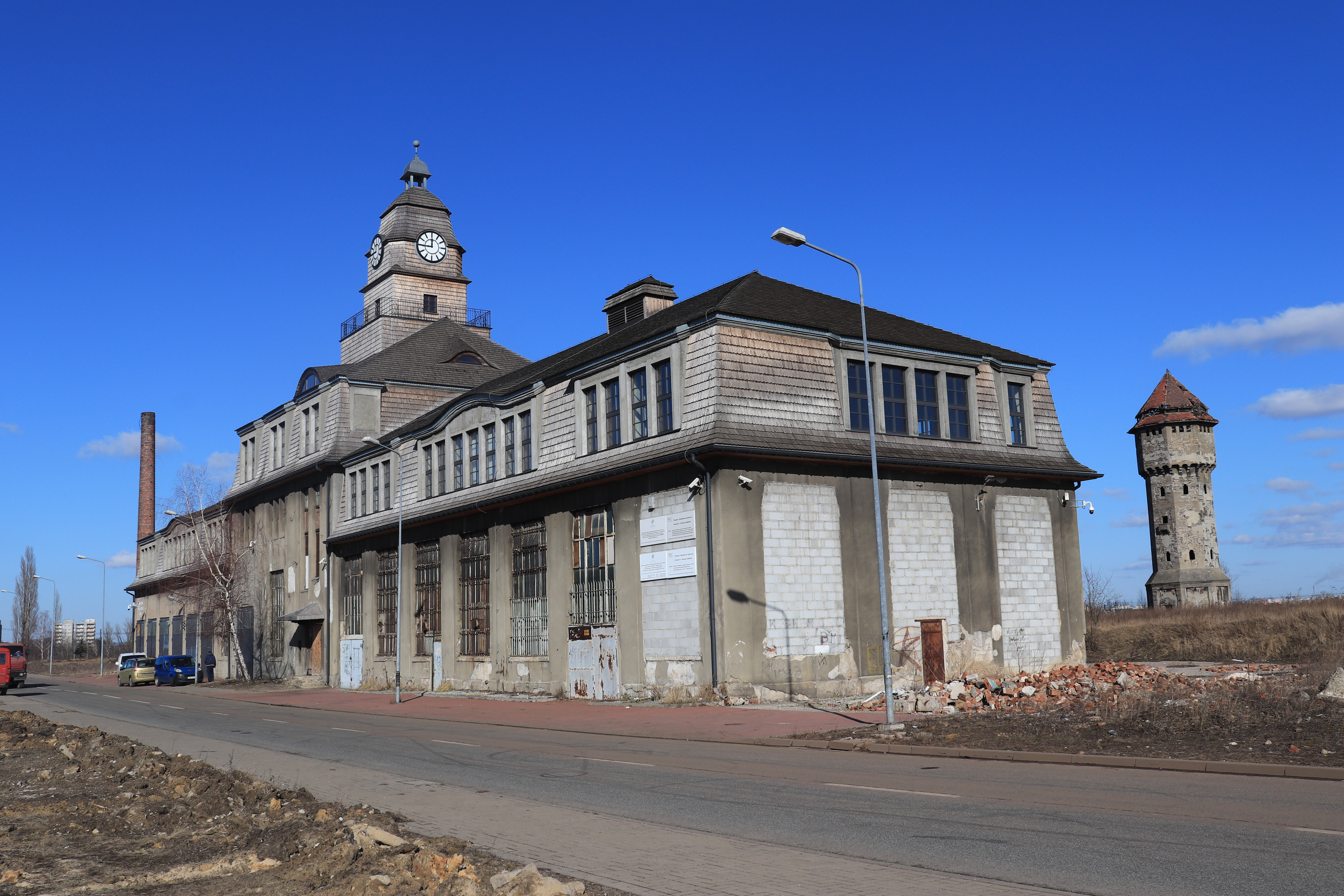
Preserved buildings of the Szopienice Non-Ferrous Metals Smelter (2019)

==== Szopienice-Burowiec ====
- Familoks of the Wilhelmina steelworks, known as "Helgoland" (15–28 Lwowska Street) – built in the 1890s in brick historicist style;
- Building of the Jan Długosz High School (2 Lwowska Street) – constructed around 1905 in Gothic Revival style;
- Tenements and familoks – mainly in the area of Józefa Kantorówna, Herbert Bednorz, Obrońców Westerplatte, Wiosny Ludów, Lwowska, Krakowska, 11 Listopada, Morawa streets, and at Powstańców Śląskich Square; predominantly from the turn of the 19th and 20th centuries, as well as the early 20th century;
- Church of St. Hedwig of Silesia (Powstańców Śląskich Square) – erected between 1885 and 1887 in Gothic Revival style;
- Church of the Saviour (H. Bednorz Street) – built between 1899 and 1901 in Gothic Revival style, likely to a design by Gustav Wernicke. This brick structure features a single-nave rectangular body with a tower; a three-sided chancel adjoins the church;
- Prittwitz Palace (81–83 Krakowska Street) – dating from the 1870s (or around 1880) in round-arch style. This two-story U-shaped building includes bossage, friezes, arched windows, and a decorative crowning cornice on the façade;
- School with residential building (22 Wiosny Ludów Street) – constructed in 1898 in historicist and Gothic Revival styles;
- Water tower (Janusz Korczak Street) – built in 1912 in Art Nouveau style to a design by Emil and Georg Zillmann;
- Jacobsen Villa (60 H. Bednorz Street) – from the early 20th century in historicist and modernist styles;
- Buildings of the Mokrski brothers brewery (8 H. Bednorz Street) – developed between 1885 and 1905 (construction began in 1880) in historicist style. The complex includes the grounds and structures such as a restaurant, engine and boiler house, residential building and fire station, stable and cooperage, toilet and gazebo, brewhouse, cellars, cooling house, malt house, and gatehouse;
- Buildings of the Szopienice Non-Ferrous Metals Smelter (K. Woźniak Street) – constructed between 1910 and 1913. The complex comprises a lamp room in historicist and Baroque Revival styles, a water tower in historicist style, and a gatehouse.

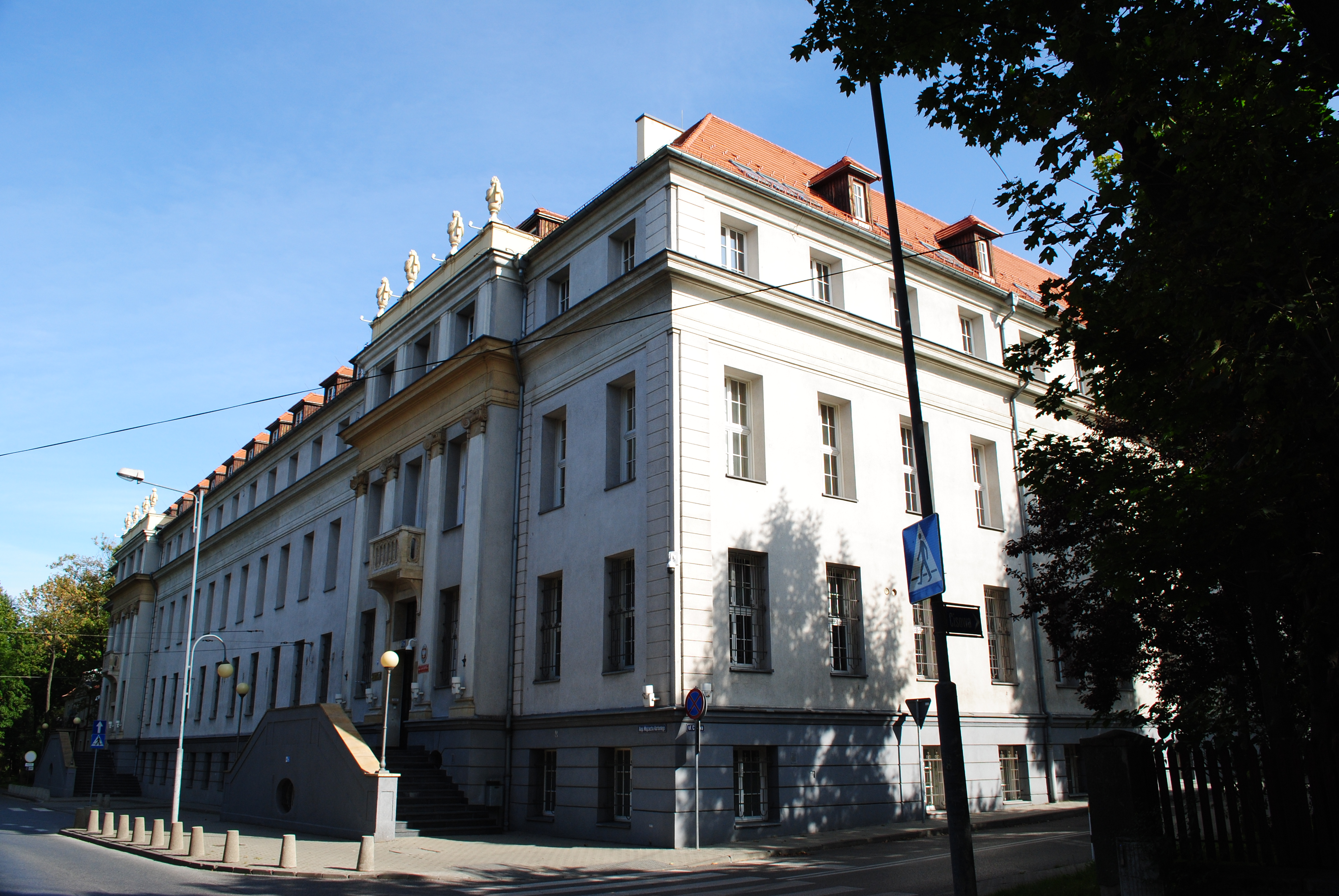
Appellate Court building (117–119 W. Korfanty Avenue)

==== Wełnowiec-Józefowiec ====
- Appellate Court building (117–119 W. Korfanty Avenue) – constructed in 1906 in Neoclassical style with elements of early modernism. This three-story structure with a usable attic is topped by a gabled roof. The façade features two avant-corps with main entrances, each articulated by four lesenes imitating columns and crowned by an attic with vase-like ornaments;
- Residential buildings of the Fryderyka colony (147–189 W. Korfanty Avenue);
- Buildings – including along Józefowska, Bytkowska, Nowy Świat, Modelarska, Rysia, Bytomska, Agnieszka, Piotr Ściegienny, Słoneczna, and Gnieźnieńska streets; these are stylistically diverse buildings mainly from the turn of the 19th and 20th centuries;
- Buildings of the Alfred shaft and Alfred colony (1–12 Alfred Square; 182 and 184 W. Korfanty Avenue) – dating mainly from 1881–1890 and 1910 in historicist and modernist styles. The complex includes a locomotive shed, workshops, boiler house, engine house, headframe, bathhouse, lamp room, forge, and stable.

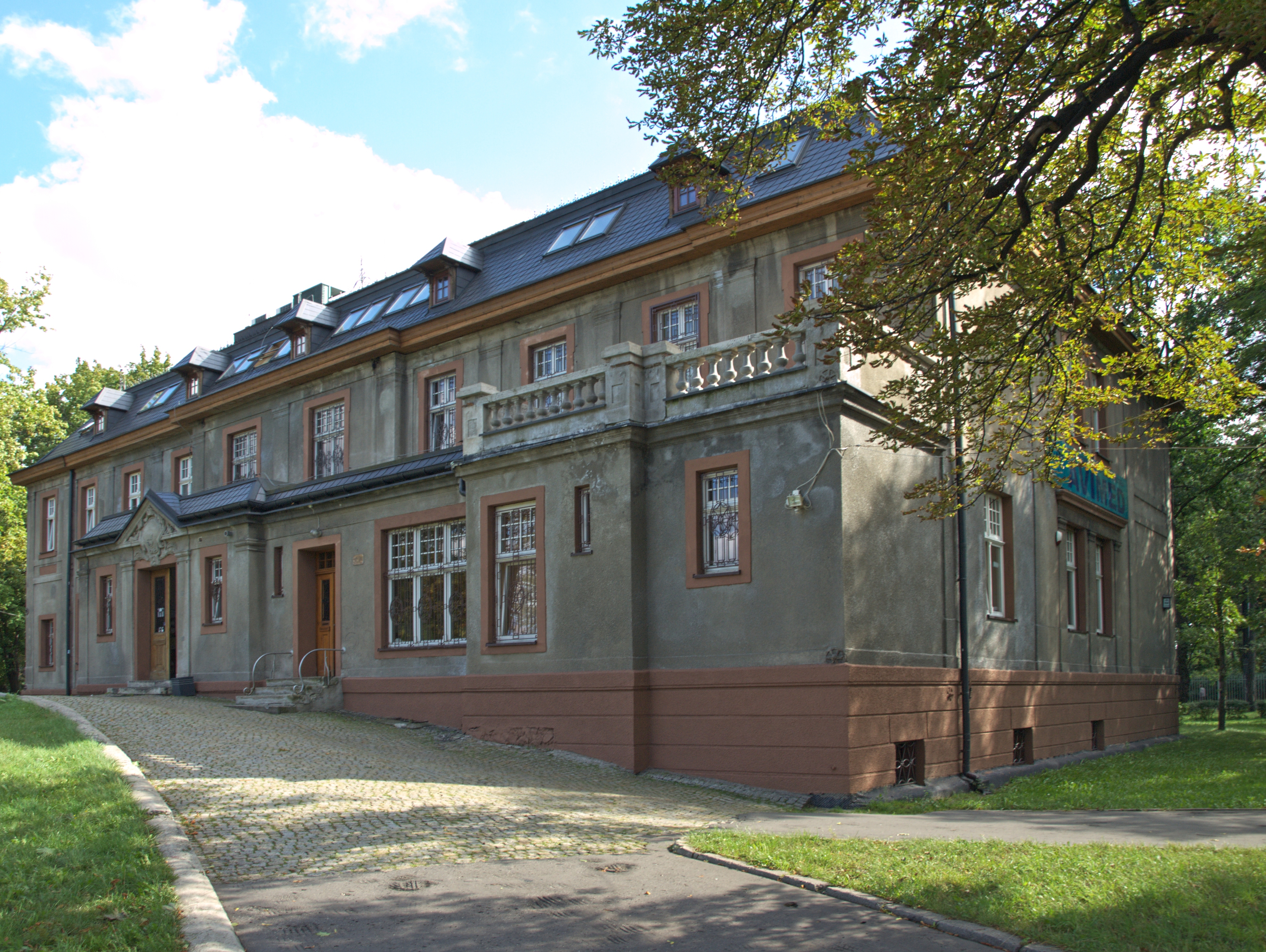
Załęże Palace (159 Gliwicka Street)

==== Załęże and Osiedle Witosa ====
- Tenements and familoks – including along Gliwicka, Wincenty Janas, and Paweł Pośpiech streets; mainly from the turn of the 19th and 20th centuries;
- Workers' colony of the Kleofas mine, including the workers' building – in the area of Feliks Bocheński, Lisa, and Wiśniowa streets; from the early 20th century in historicist style;
- Church of St. Joseph (Gliwicka Street) – built between 1898 and 1900 to a design by Ludwig Schneider. It takes the form of a three-nave basilica with side aisles covered by transverse gable roofs. The church features a tower with a ridge turret and clocks located at the intersection of the transept and main nave;
- Palace (159 Gliwicka Street) – erected between 1886 and 1887 in Classicism style to an unknown design. Originally part of a farm complex with a manor house, this two-story structure with basement and attic includes decorative elevations. The interior preserves a richly ornamented wooden staircase;
- Buildings of the Kleofas mine (Obroki Street; Feliks Bocheński Street) – dating from the late 19th century in historicist style, comprising the Fortuna III shaft, boiler house, and power plant, as well as the 1913 Wschodni II shaft.

==== Non-existent buildings ====
- Building of the Evangelical-Augsburg parsonage in Katowice-Szopienice (20 H. Bednorz Street) – built in 1901 in historicist and modernist styles; destroyed in January 2023;
- Mieroszewski hunting manor in Janów (3a Nad Stawem Street) – dating from the mid-19th century, together with old trees; demolished in October 2021.

== Interwar architecture (1922–1939) ==
=== Downtown Katowice ===
Katowice, upon incorporation into Poland in 1922, was already a fully developed urban entity with a well-defined urban layout and distinct architectural character. The city became the seat of the autonomous Silesian Voivodeship, and the Silesian Voivodeship Office emerged as the largest investor in the region during the interwar period. Substantial involvement by voivodeship authorities in construction projects was necessitated by the conditions inherited by the Polish administration, as the city was not prepared to assume its new administrative functions.

Initially, the Voivodeship Office was housed in the building of the School of Building Crafts on Wojewódzka Street. In 1923, a competition was announced for a new seat for the Voivodeship Office and the Silesian Parliament on Jagiellońska Street. The winning design was submitted by Kraków architects Kazimierz Wyczyński, Stefan Żeleński, and Piotr Jurkiewicz. The building was dedicated on 5 May 1929 in the presence of President of Poland Ignacy Mościcki. During the interwar period, it was the largest structure of its kind in Poland.

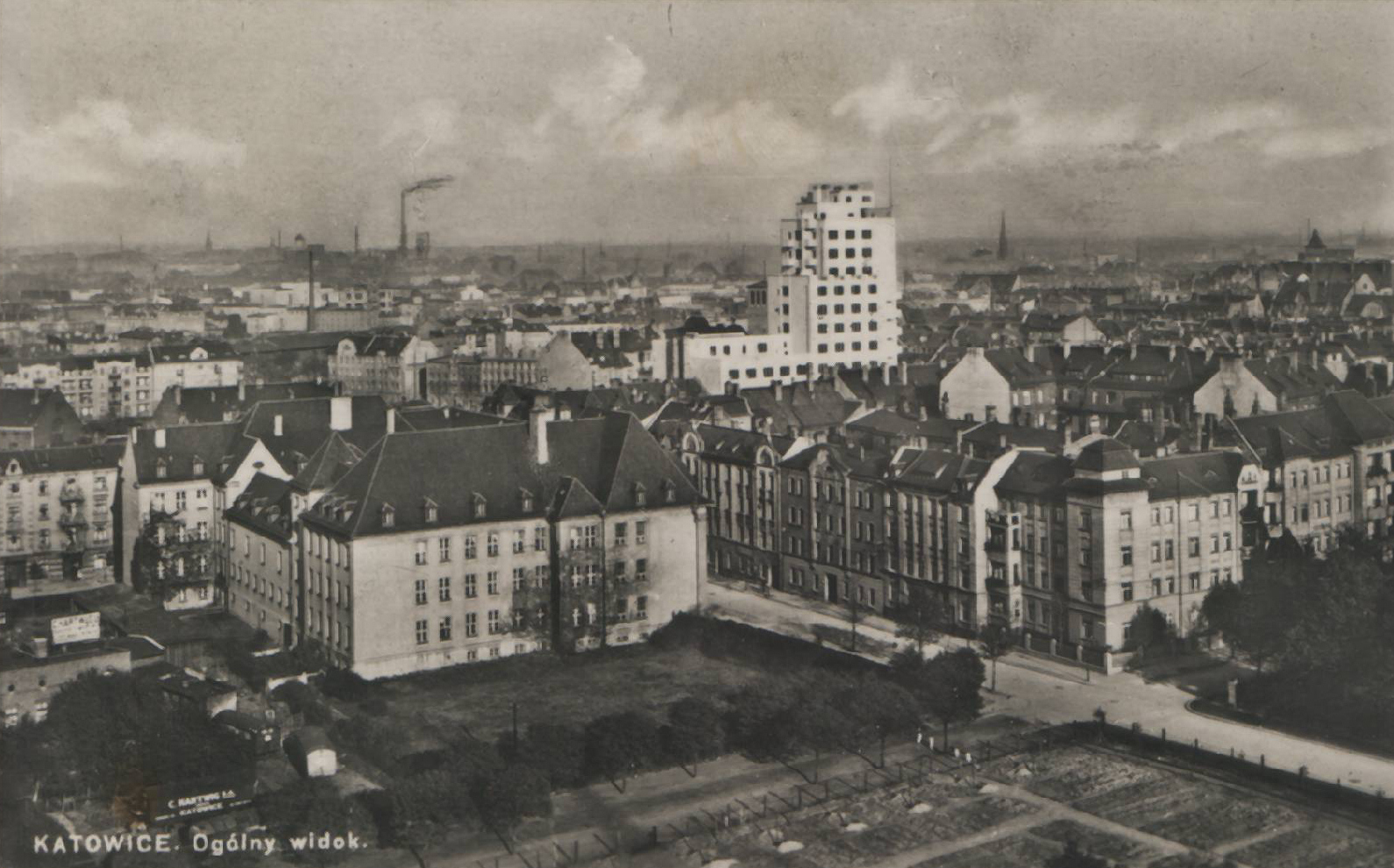
Panorama of southern Śródmieście; Drapacz Chmur is visible in the center

In the vicinity of the Silesian Parliament building, several other monumental structures were erected. Construction of the Polish Ironworks Syndicate building was completed in 1930. The Non-Departmental Offices building was constructed between 1935 and 1936, and work on the Silesian Museum began in 1936. By the summer of 1939, the museum was complete in its raw state, but it was dismantled by the Germans during World War II. For the City Magistrate and Katowice City Council, a new building was erected at 4 Młyńska Street around the turn of the 1920s and 1930s. Several new religious buildings also appeared, including the Cathedral of Christ the King, construction of which began in 1927, and the garrison church on M. Skłodowska-Curie Street, built around the turn of the 1920s and 1930s.

Katowice then acquired a new spatial orientation, with urban development proceeding southward. The first urban plans were drawn up in 1924 and 1930. In 1935, a competition was announced for the urban regulation and reconstruction of the city; the selected design by Władysław Czarnecki and Marian Spychalski proposed denser development and the promotion of high-rise construction – skyscrapers. The need for urban densification was urgent due to the significant growth in the city's population. The first building of this type was the teachers' residence for the Silesian Technical Educational Institutions on Wojewódzka Street. On Żwirki i Wigury Street, Drapacz Chmur was erected; its construction marked the first use in Poland of a steel skeletal frame designed by Stefan Bryła. In addition to administrative or religious structures, high-standard residential complexes were also developed in the southern part of the city. Such developments emerged in areas including Francuska, Jagiellońska, H. Jordan, J. Kiliński, J. Poniatowski, PCK, J. Rymera, Podchorążych, and M. Kopernik streets.

In the early years of the interwar period, a significant architectural community formed in Katowice. In 1925, on the initiative of Tadeusz Michejda, the Association of Architects in Silesia was established. Architects – graduates of Lviv and Warsaw polytechnics – began arriving in the city. Prominent Katowice architects of the interwar era included Karol Schayer, Eustachy Chmielewski, Zbigniew Rzepecki, Witold Kłębkowski, Tadeusz Łobos, Leon Dietz d'Arma, Romuald Pieńkowski, and Jan Graefe.

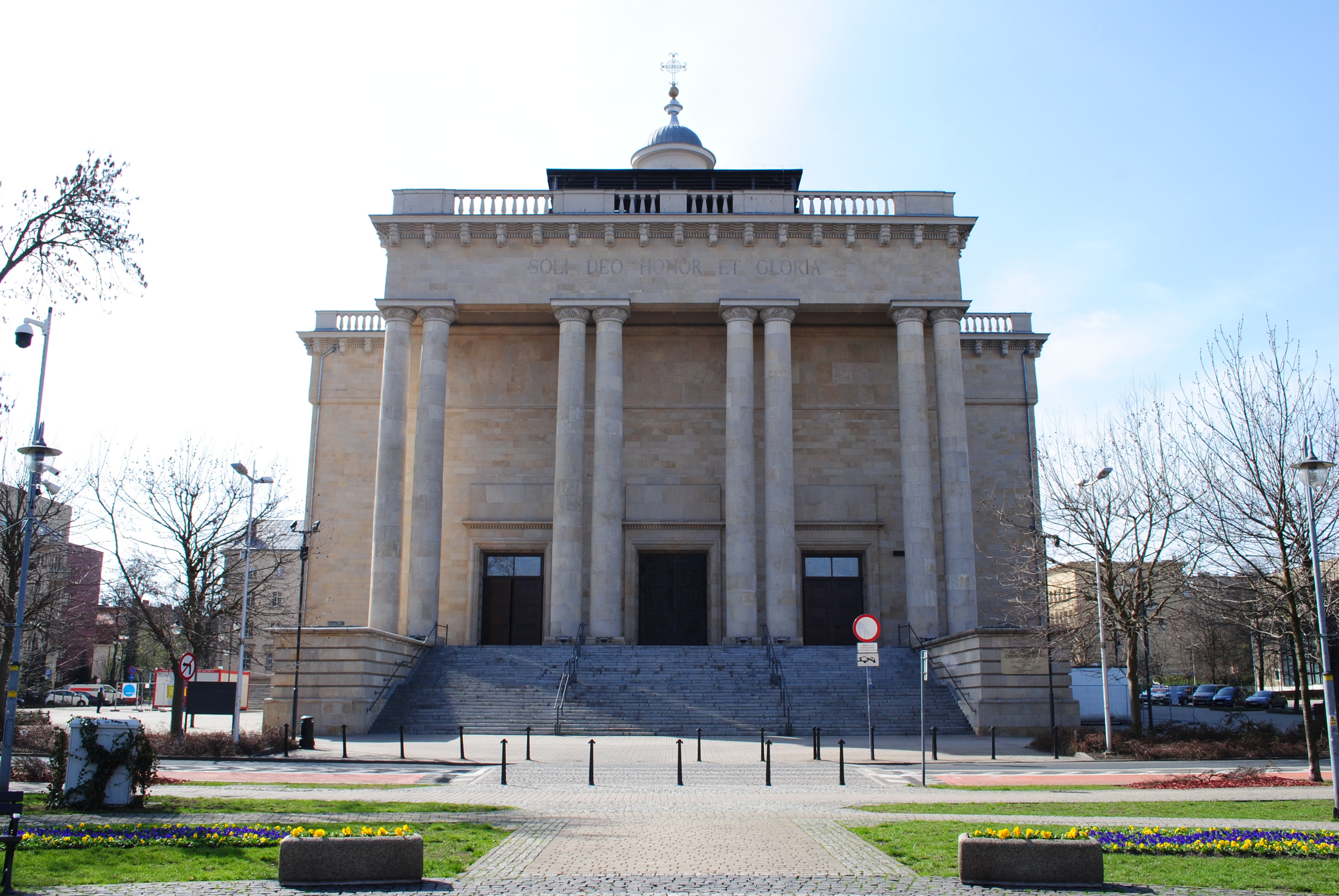
Cathedral of Christ the King in 2021, before construction of the tympanum

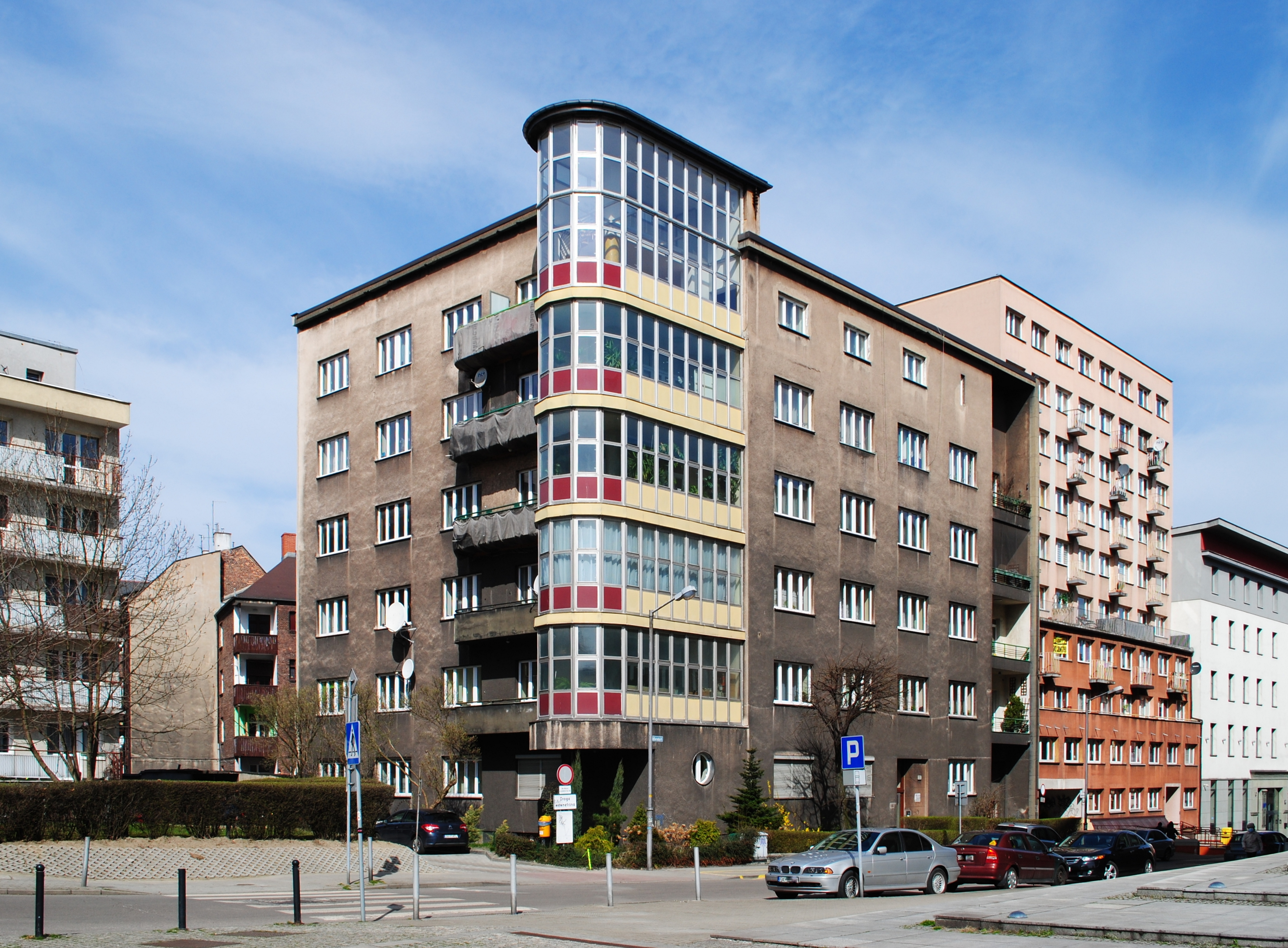
Felix House (3 Podchorążych Street)

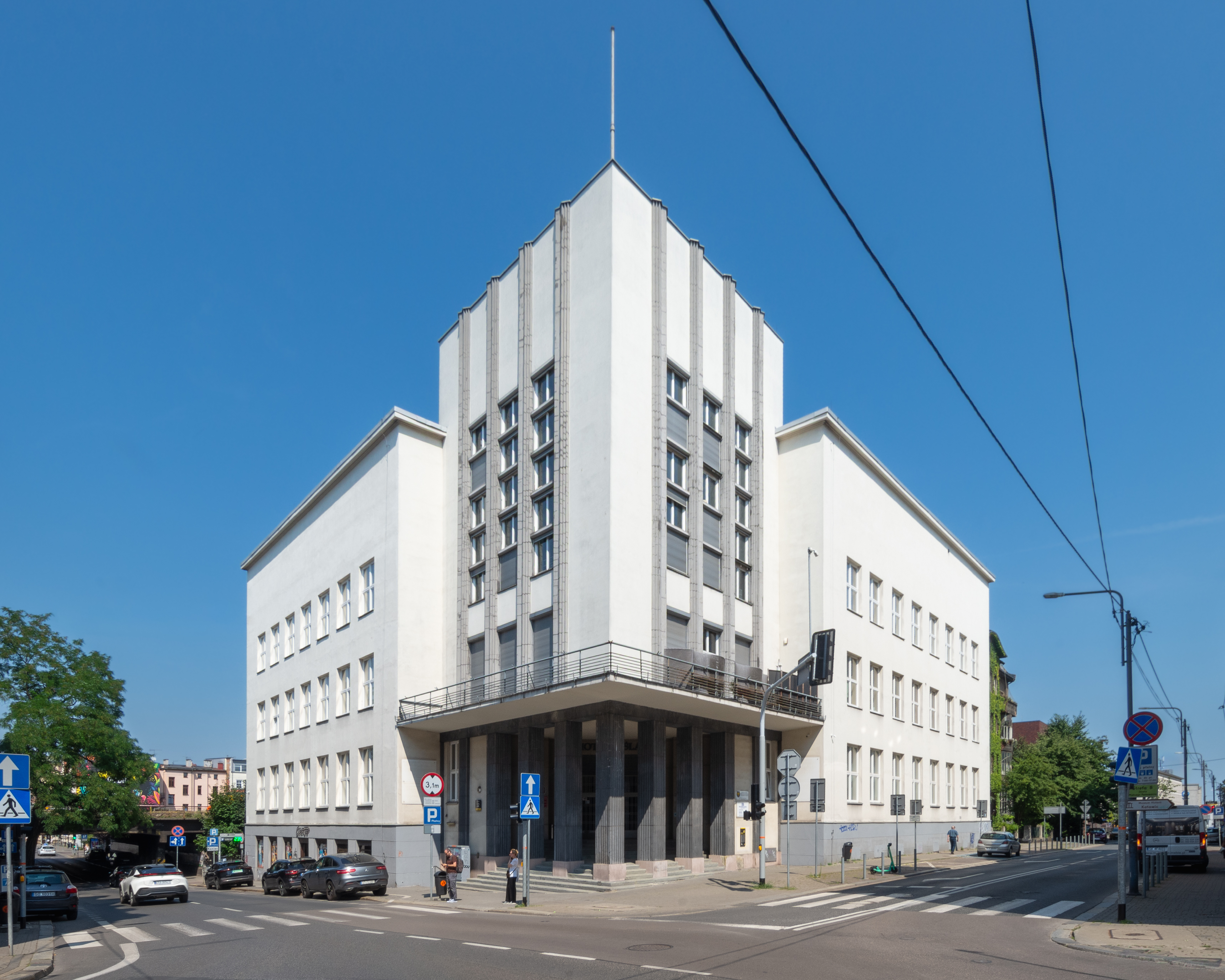
Educational House at 12 Francuska Street in 2007

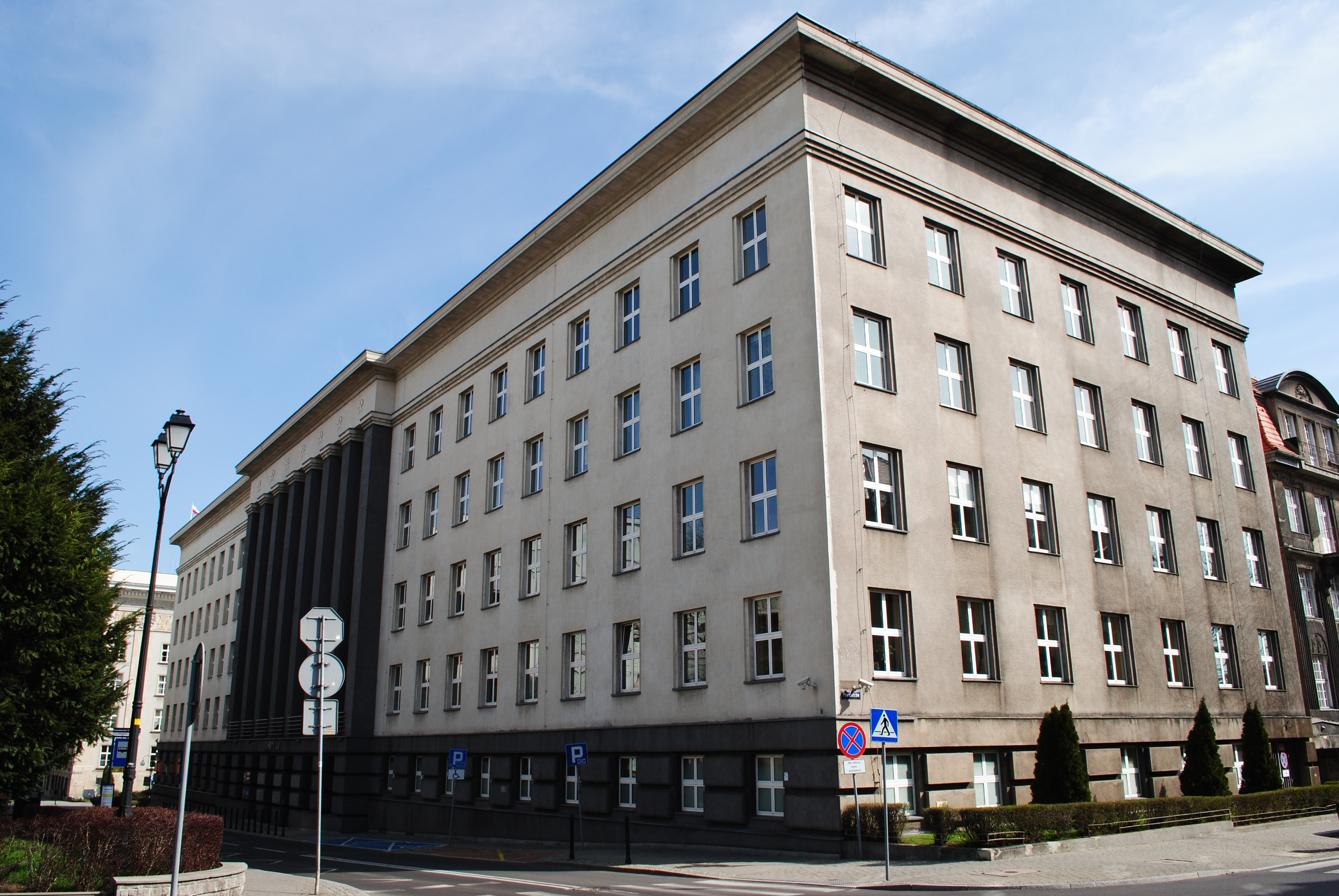
Polish Iron Mills Syndicate building (14 J. Lompa Street)

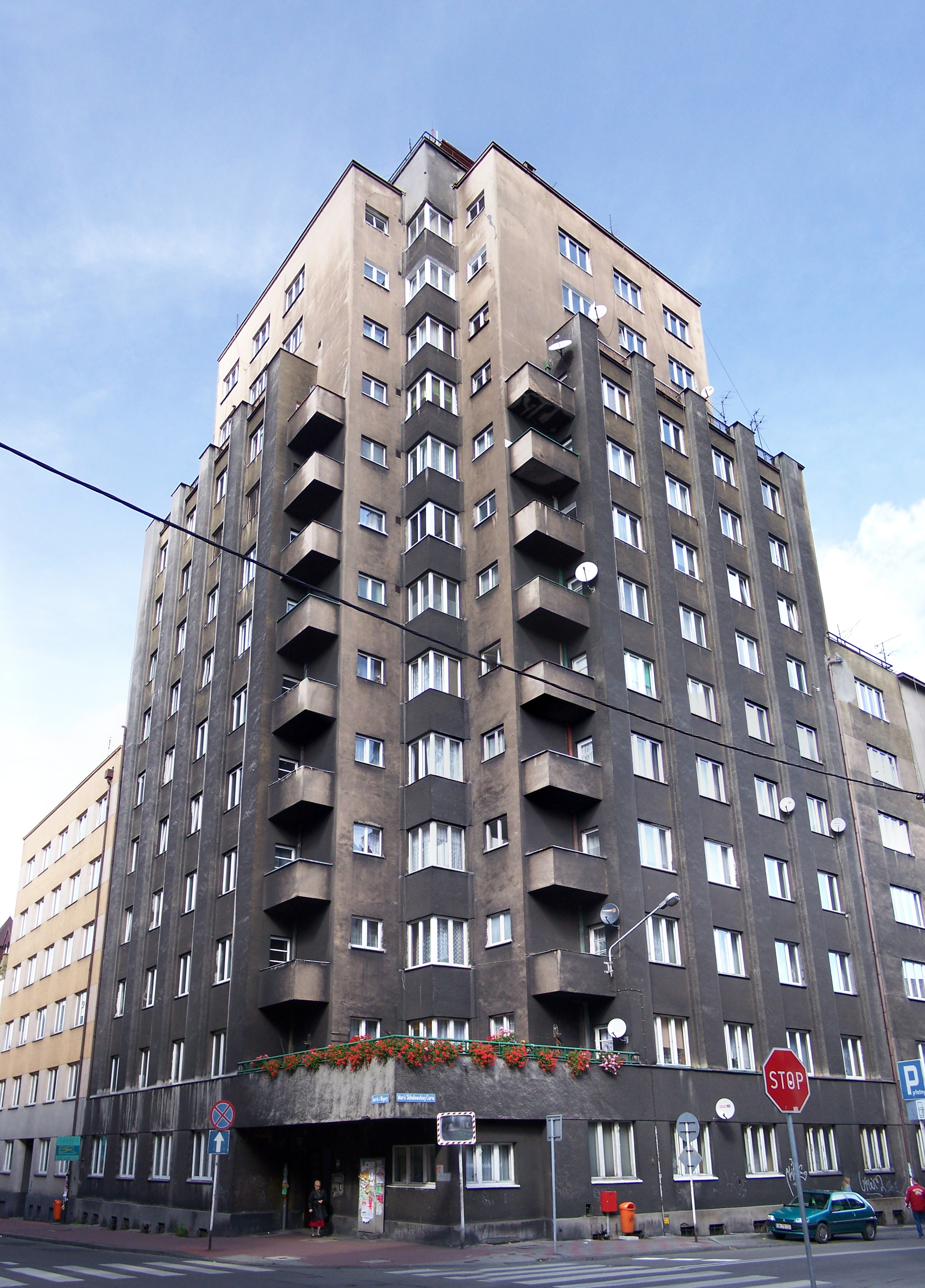
Drapacz Chmur at 15 Żwirki i Wigury Street in 2006

==== Selected interwar buildings in downtown Katowice ====
- Cathedral of Christ the King (Plebiscytowa Street) – constructed intermittently between 1927 and 1955 to a design by Zygmunt Gawlik. It features a colonnaded portico oriented toward the city center and a prominent dome elevated on a tholobate;
- Police School building (15 Józef Poniatowski Street) – completed in March 1925 to a design by Marian Łobodziński. It is characterized by rhythmic lesene articulations extending across its three stories;
- House of attorney Wojciech Żytomirski (6 PCK Street) – designed by Karol Schayer in 1936, incorporates an undercut ground floor supported by a freestanding column, an overhanging avant-corps, and an openwork baluster crowning the volume;
- Łucja and Dawid Felix House (3 Podchorążych Street) – likely designed by Filip Brenner with plans submitted for approval in June 1936. It features a large rounded avant-corps spanning all stories, enclosing a fully glazed winter garden;
- Residential building for professors of the Silesian Technical Scientific Institutions (23 Wojewódzka Street) – completed in 1931 to a design by Eustachy Chmielewski. It consists of a central eight-story block flanked by five-story wings. It represents the earliest high-rise residential structure in Katowice;
- Social Insurance Institution Residential Building (M. Skłodowska-Curie Street) – completed in 1939, likely to a design by Stanisław Tabeński. It consists of robust polygonal volumes arranged in rhythmic composition;
- Educational House (12 Francuska Street) – erected between 1928 and 1934 to a design by Stanisław Tabeński and Józef Rybicki. It is formed by three rectangular blocks with the corner emphasized by vertical projections and rows of profiled lesenes;
- Silesian Insurgent House (3 Jan Matejko Street) – built in 1937 (or between 1936 and 1939) to a design by Zbigniew Rzepecki. It is a seven-story structure with an asymmetrical volume highlighted by a projecting bay window;
- National Economy Bank officials' house (2 Narcyzów Street) – constructed between 1929 and 1930 in functionalist style to a design by Stanisław Tabeński and Jacek Rybicki. It is divided into two sections with separate entrances and an interior courtyard approximating a cross plan;
- National Economy Bank building (3 A. Mickiewicz Street) – built between 1928 and 1930 in modernist style to a design by Stanisław Tabeński. It exhibits a stepped volume adapted to the former alignment of Skośna Street;
- Magistrate office building (4 Młyńska Street) – erected between 1929 and 1931 to a design by Lucjan Sikorski. It has a gently concave form following the street line, with vertical window axes accentuating the council chamber;
- Upper Silesian United Królewska and Laura Mills building (30 Tadeusz Kościuszko Street) – constructed between 1927 and 1929. It comprises a seven-story section facing T. Kościuszko Street and a five-story section facing Juliusz Ligoń Street, with a rounded corner featuring a semicircular recessed portico;
- Polish Radio Broadcasting Station building (29 J. Ligoń Street) – dating to 1937 (or 1938) and designed by Tadeusz Łobos. It presents a minimally articulated volume with smooth wall surfaces and uniform window rhythm, offset by a large blank wall on the J. Ligoń Street side;
- Silesian Parliament building (25 Jagiellońska Street) – built between 1924 and 1929 to a design by Kazimierz Wyczyński, Ludwik Wojtyczko, Stefan Żeleński, and Piotr Jurkiewicz. It has an upper frieze incorporating coats of arms of cities in the Silesian Voivodeship;
- Polish Iron Mills Syndicate building (14 J. Lompa Street) – completed in May 1930 to a design by Tadeusz Michejda and Lucjan Sikorski. It is a massive structure with flat elevations, articulated solely by an axial portico composed of full-height pillars and a crowning cornice;
- Silesian Technical Scientific Institutions building (Zygmunt Krasiński Street/Graniczna Street) – constructed between 1927 and 1931 (or until 1934) to a design by Jadwiga Dobrzyńska and Zygmunt Łoboda. The building was planned with 400 rooms for lecture halls, exercise rooms, laboratories, and offices. The entire structure consists of two prone prismatic blocks forming an L-shaped plan, with the corner distinguished by a one-story superstructure;
- Non-Consolidated Offices building (Silesian Parliament Square) – built between 1935 and 1936 (or in 1935) to a design by Witold Kłębkowski. It has a simple six-story elongated volume with uniformly smooth walls;
- Drapacz Chmur (15–17 Żwirki i Wigury Street) – completed in 1934 to a design by Tadeusz Kozłowski with steel construction by Stefan Bryła. The volume consists of two parts: a lower eight-story section housing offices and a seventeen-story residential skyscraper;
- Residential tenement house (7 J. Rymera Street) – designed by Henryk Schmidtke with plans approved in April 1937. It features rhythmic horizontal divisions in the form of window bands, with the flatness of the volume contrasted by a vertical strip of very wide balconies with solid enclosures;
- Officials' colony on Raciborska Street (31–35 Raciborska Street) – dating from 1928 to a design by Lucjan Sikorski. It consists of modest repetitive residential blocks with smooth walls and flat roofs;
- Church of St. Casimir the Prince (Mikołaj Kopernik Street/M. Skłodowska-Curie Street) – consecrated in 1933 and built to a design by Leon Dietz d'Arma in collaboration with Jan Zarzycki. The volume consists of simple prismatic blocks, dominated by a tall bell tower terminating in an openwork superstructure crowned by a cross;
- Tadeusz Michejda Villa (19 Józef Poniatowski Street) – constructed between 1926 and 1929. It has a cubic volume, a façade with three stepped recesses, and crystalline façade decoration.

==== Non-existent buildings ====
- Former Silesian Museum building (Henryk Dąbrowski Street) – designed by Karol Schayer, with construction beginning in 1936 and reaching shell completion by 1939. It was dismantled in 1941 on orders of the German occupation authorities. The structure was planned on an H-shaped layout, with the main eight-story section intended for exhibition halls;
- Market hall (6 Piotr Skarga Street) – dating from 1935 to a design by Stefan Bryła. It was a single-nave structure capable of accommodating 400 stalls. Between 2002 and 2003, it was rebuilt for the Supersam shopping gallery, and in 2013 the hall was demolished for a new shopping center.

=== Other parts of the city ===
On 15 July 1924, the Silesian Parliament passed a law incorporating Bogucice, Brynów, Dąb, Ligota, and Załęże into the administrative boundaries of Katowice. These areas differed significantly in their built environment at the time: Ligota had sparse development; parts of Brynów were unsuitable for construction due to mining subsidence; the extensions of downtown thoroughfares included 1 Maja Street in Zawodzie and Gliwicka Street in Załęże, lined with bourgeois tenements adjacent to workers' familoks; while Bogucice and Dąb featured loose, discontinuous development without forming a continuous built-up area with the clusters in central Katowice.

As early as 1924, an urban development plan for Katowice was prepared, continuing the urbanistic principles established in 1918. It envisaged expansion in a southwestern direction, while the 1930 plan also provided for growth eastward and northward. In Brynów, interwar construction primarily consisted of two-story houses. Ligota saw more extensive development, including an officials' housing estate initiated in 1929. New buildings in Dąb appeared along streets such as Dębowa, Błękitna, and Widok; in Bogucice around Katowicka, Klonowa, Brzozowa, and Topolowa streets; and in Załęże, on the border with Hajduki, a colony of 44 semi-detached duplex houses was built and named after Polish President Ignacy Mościcki.

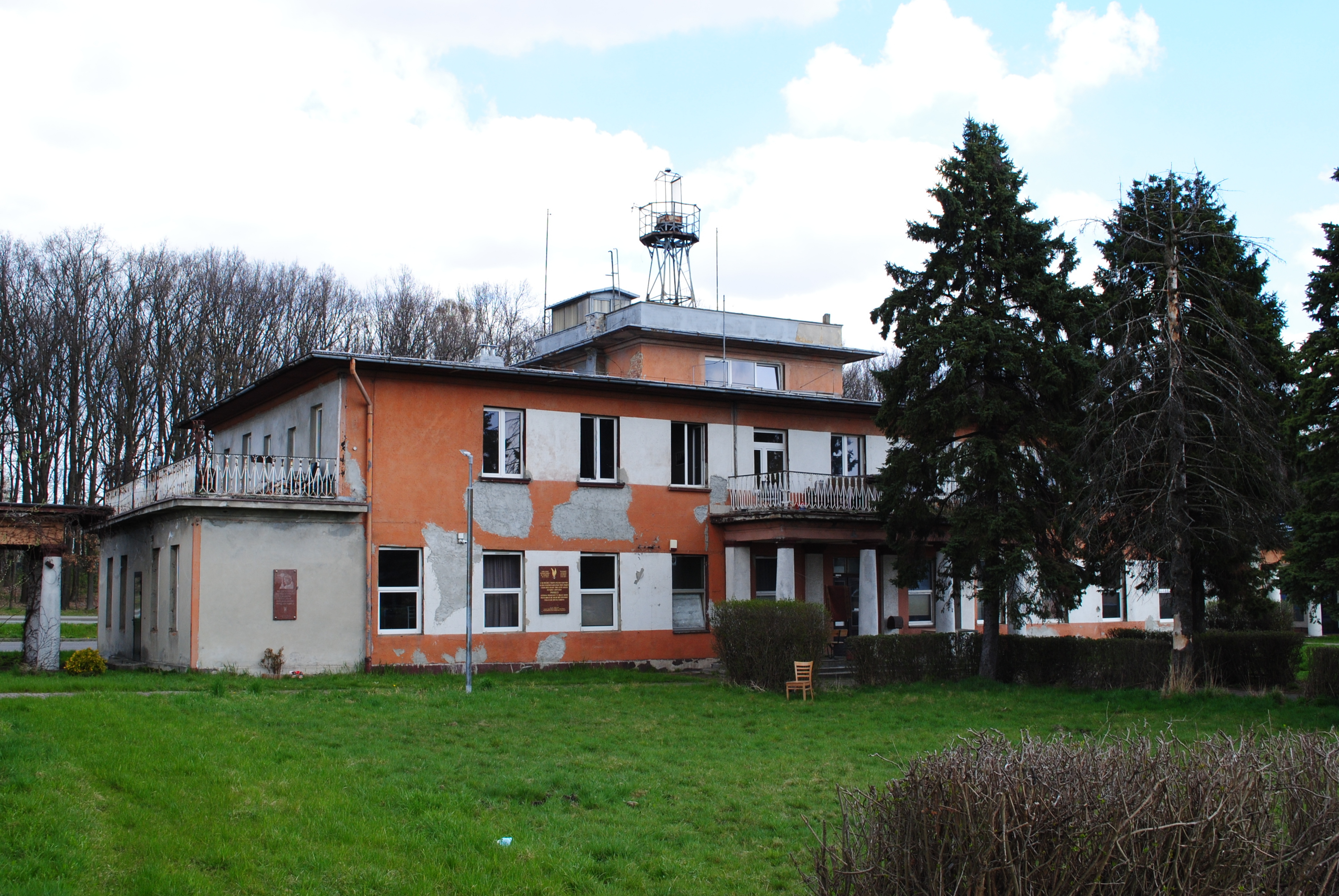
Katowice-Muchowiec Airport terminal building (40 Lotnisko Street)

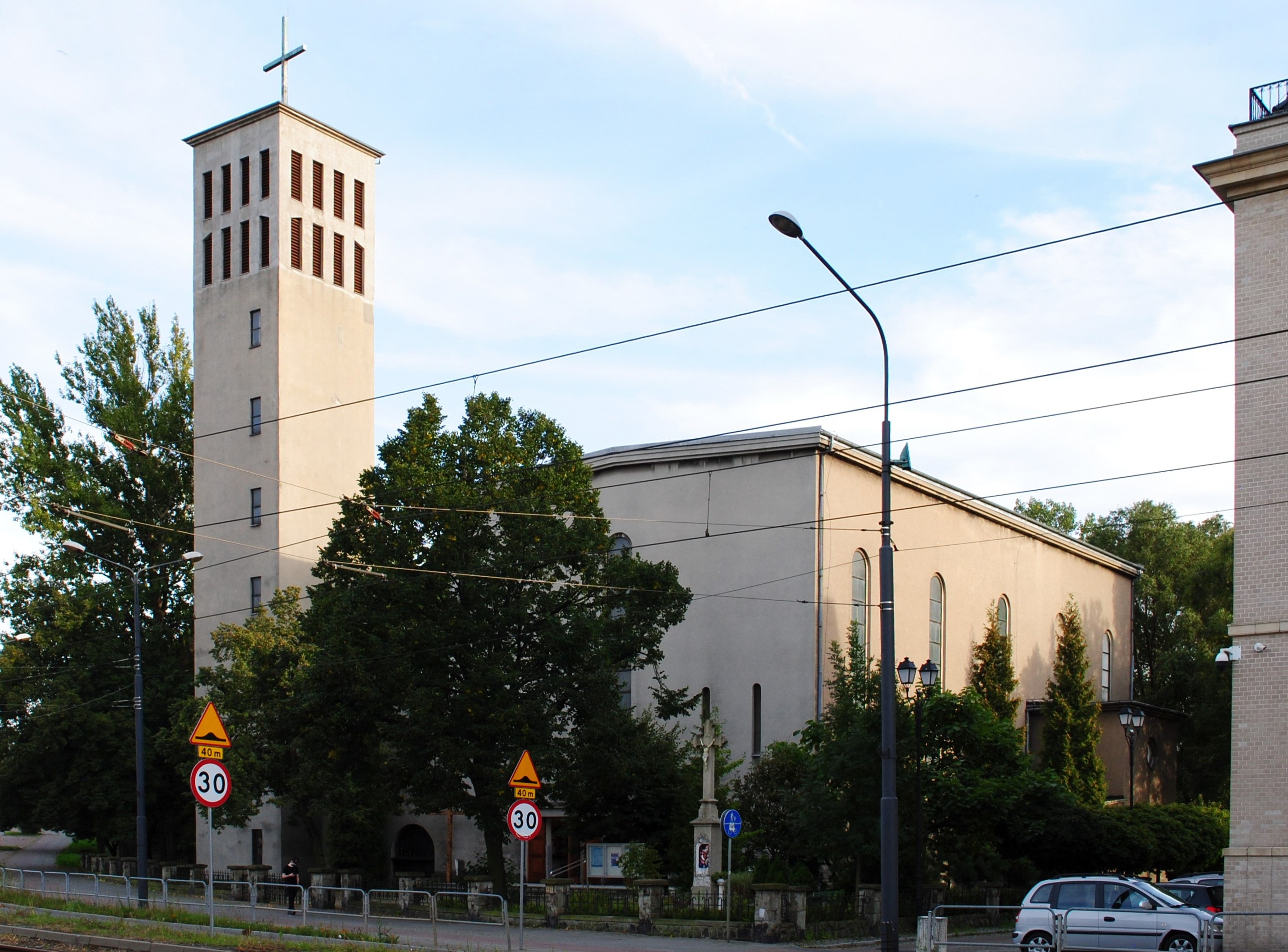
Church of Divine Providence on 1 Maja Street (2020)

==== Selected interwar architecture buildings outside downtown Katowice ====
- Municipal Asylum building in Załęże (14 Paweł Pośpiech Street) – constructed between 1928 and 1929 in modernist style. This two-volume, three-story reinforced concrete skeletal structure features elevations articulated by horizontal window bands originally separated by brick panels;
- Kindergarten No. 39 building in Załęże (212 Gliwicka Street) – dates from the 1930s and exemplifies International Style with elements of Streamline Moderne style;
- Building of the Capitol stage of the Silesian Puppet and Actor Ateneum Theater in Dąbrówka Mała (71 Józef Haller Street) – constructed in the 1930s in functionalist style;
- House No. 2 of the Congregation of Sisters of St. Hedwig in Dąbrówka Mała (1 Strzelców Bytomskich Street) – built in 1936 in functionalist style;
- Katowice-Muchowiec Airport terminal building (40 Lotnisko Street) – dating from the 1920s, designed by Tadeusz Michejda in collaboration with Lucjan Sikorski in a classicising manner. It is a single-story central block flanked by single-story pavilions;
- 4th General Secondary School building (54 Katowicka Street) – dates from the 1930s and is executed in functionalist style;
- Ignacy Mościcki Colony in Załęże (Gliwicka Street) – built between 1927 and 1928 to a design by Józef Krzemiński. It comprises modest semi-detached duplex houses crowned by steep gabled roofs;
- Officials' colony in Ligota (Piotrowicka Street/Panewnicka Street) – constructed in the second half of the 1930s. It was conceived as a model residential district for an industrial city, applying contemporary principles of architecture and urbanism with references to garden city planning;
- Church of Divine Providence in Zawodzie (1 Maja Street) – built between 1930 and 1931, with the tower completed by 1939, to a design by Tadeusz Łobos. It has a simple, massive cubic volume with unadorned elevation planes;
- Multi-family housing estate in Bogucice (area of Katowicka, Ordona, and Brzozowa streets) – dates from the second half of the 1930s and follows functionalist style;
- Former Gmina Janów town hall (59 Szopienicka Street) – erected between 1929 and 1930 in functionalist modernism to a design by Tadeusz Michejda. This multi-volume L-shaped building prominently features a clock;
- Former Gmina Szopienice town hall (24 Wiosny Ludów Street) – built in 1928 in late modernist and Art Deco style to a design by Tadeusz Michejda;
- Detached villas, known as the American colony in Giszowiec (2, 4, 6, 8, 10, and 12 Górniczego Stanu Street) – date from the first quarter of the 20th century.

== Post-war architecture (1945–1989) ==
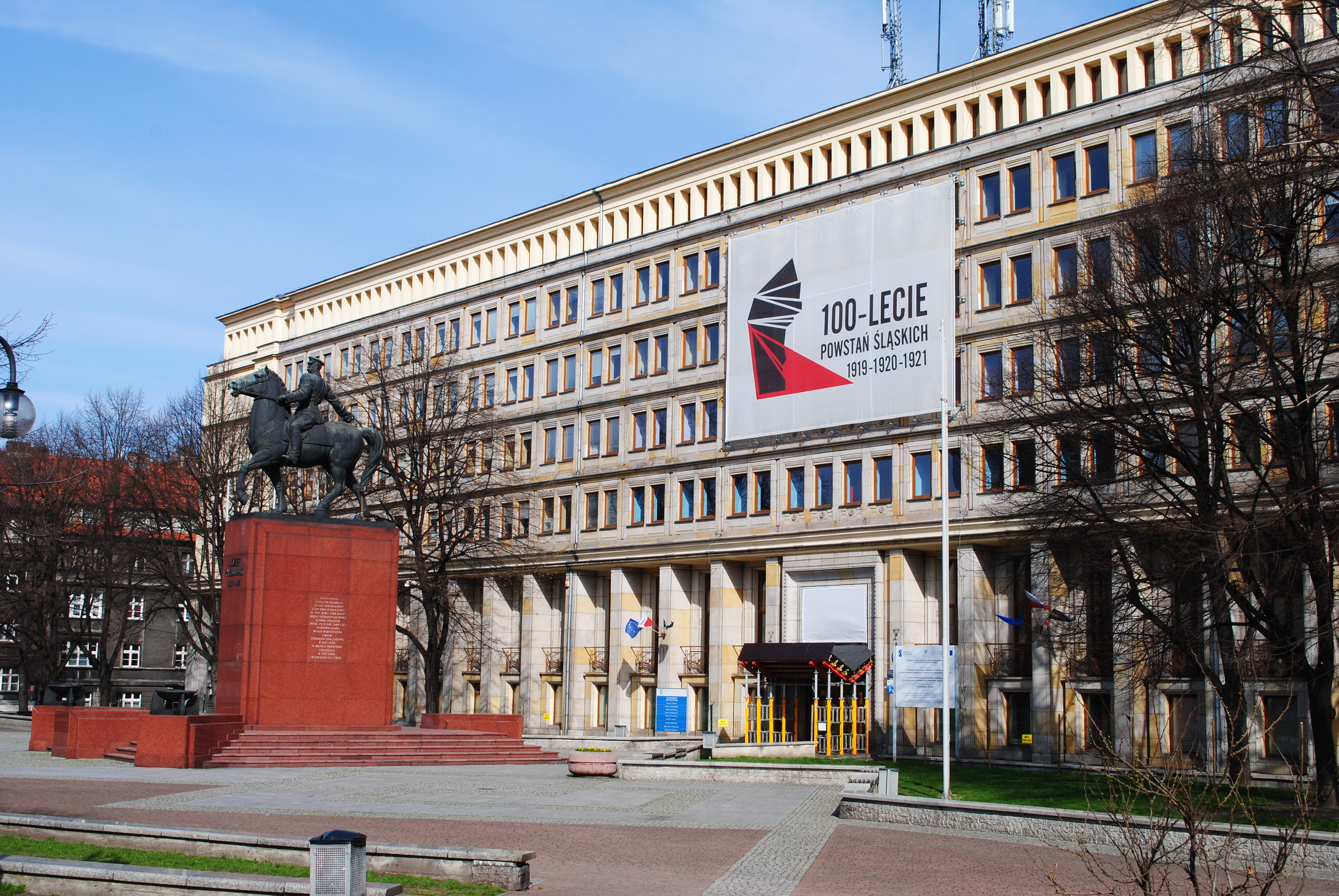
Headquarters of the Voivodeship Council of Trade Unions (2021)

After World War II, architecture in Katowice was subject to the imposed doctrine of socialist realism in its Polish interpretation. This phase was brief and exerted minimal influence on the overall stylistic character of the city's urban fabric. Prominent examples of this style include the Palace of Youth on Mikołowska Street, opened in 1951, and the headquarters of the Voivodeship Council of Trade Unions on Bolesław Chrobry Square, completed in 1955.

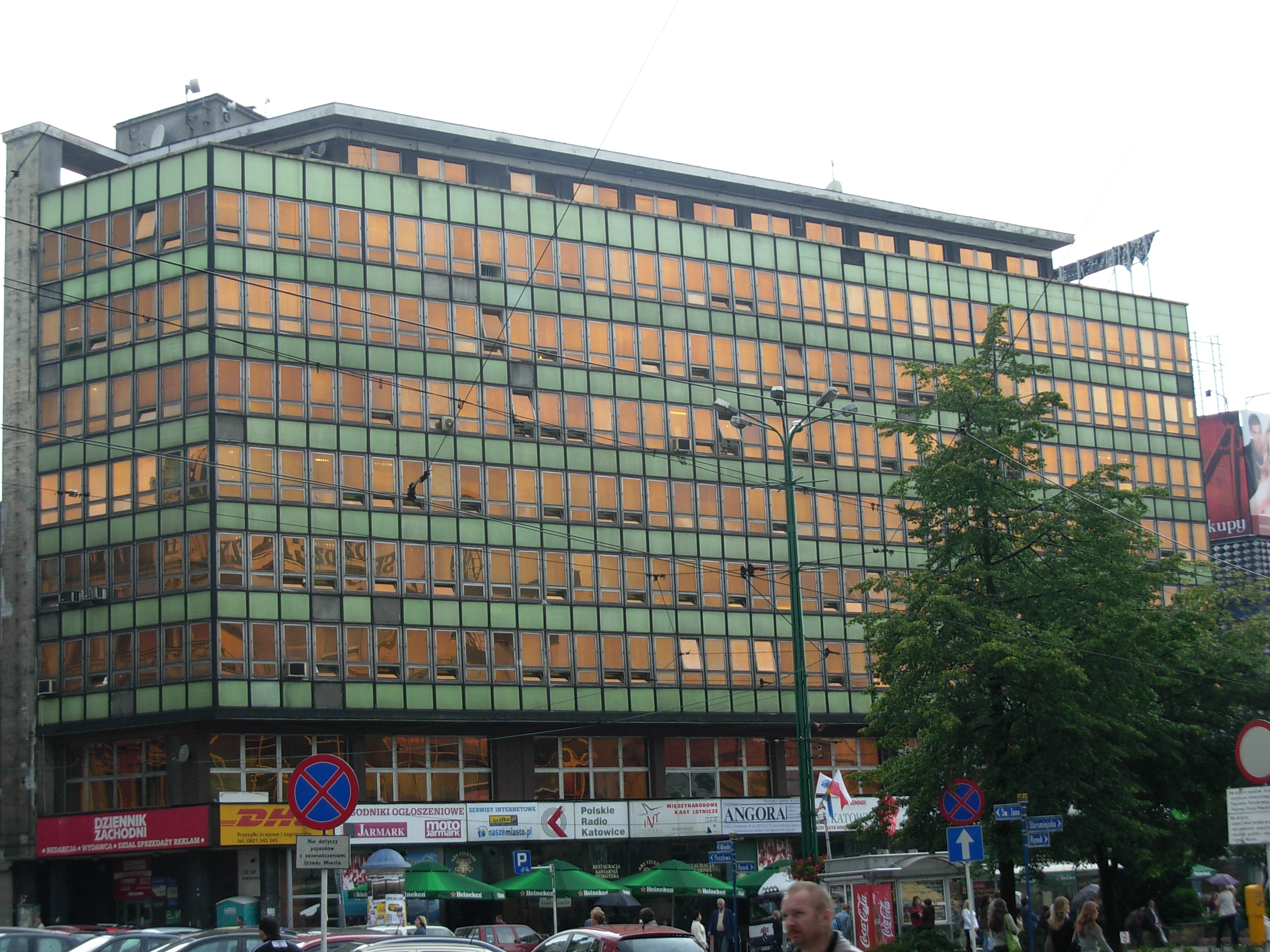
Silesian Press House with original facade in 2007 (view from St. John Street)

A competition for the reconstruction of central Katowice was announced as early as 1946–1947, but the winning proposal by Julian Duchowicz and Marian Śramkiewicz was not implemented due to financial limitations. Approval of guidelines for the long-term development of the Upper Silesian Industrial Region came in 1953 from the government of the Polish People's Republic. On this basis, Śródmieście development plan was prepared in 1954 by architects Maria and Andrzej Wilczyński and Zygmunt Winnicki from the Katowice office of Miastoprojekt. The plan proposed the establishment of an administrative, commercial, and cultural center around the Market Square, including new facilities for the Silesian Library, Silesian Opera, a theatre, radio station, philharmonic hall, and museum. Execution of the scheme would have necessitated the demolition of all historic tenements in the city center; the plan was ultimately not carried out.

The development scheme for central Katowice that proceeded to implementation was approved in 1962 and authored by Zygmunt Majerski, Julian Duchowicz, and Wiktor Lipowczan. In place of the demolished tenements surrounding the Market Square, new buildings were constructed: the Zenit department store was commissioned in September 1962, followed by the Silesian Press House, and the Skarbek department store in 1975. A roundabout was completed in the mid-1960s and subsequently named after General Jerzy Ziętek. In its vicinity, the Spodek arena was opened in 1971, with the office building for the Regional Directorate of State Railways erected adjacent to it in 1972.

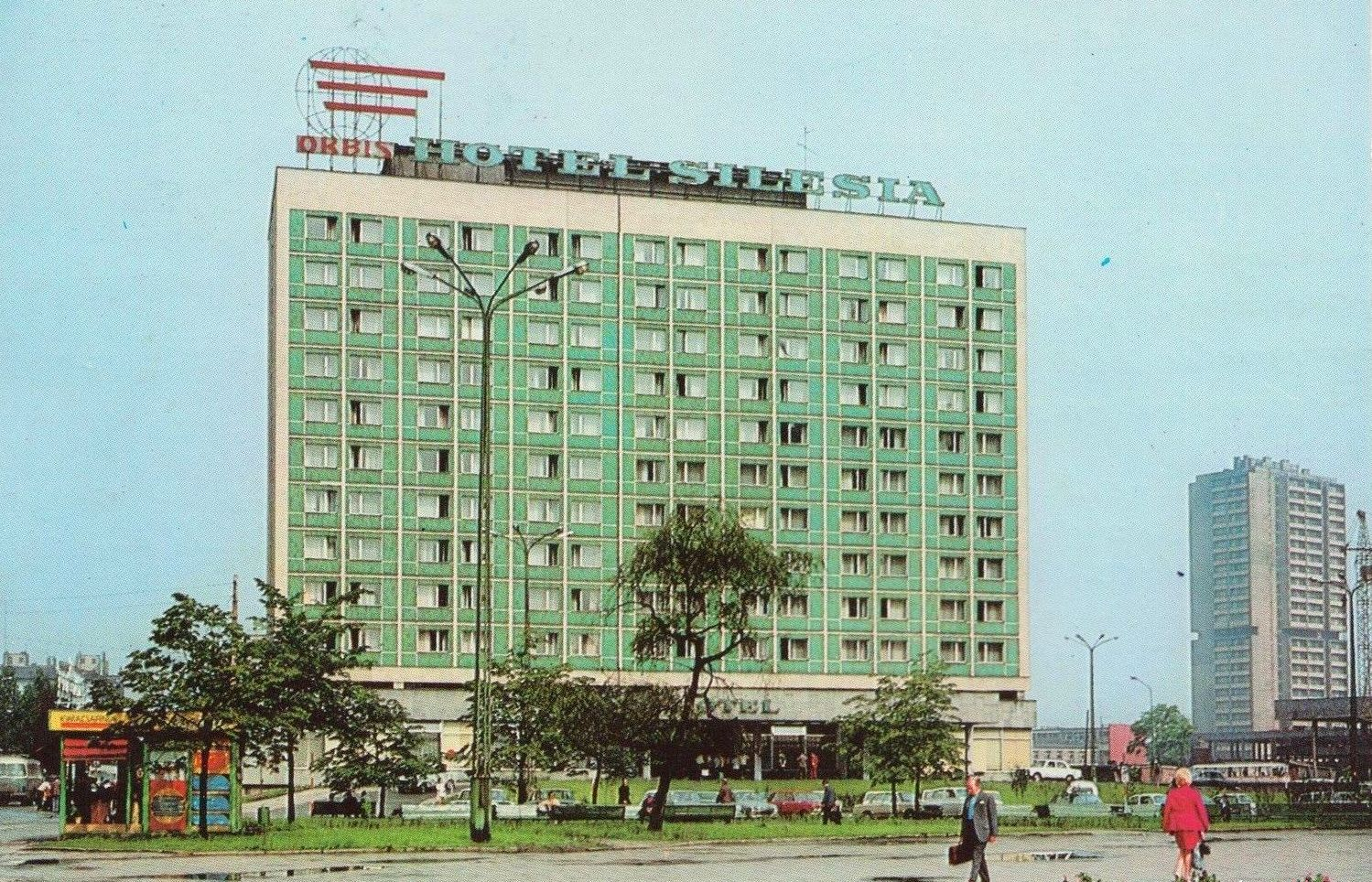
Silesia Hotel on a postcard issued in 1976

During the reconstruction of the city center, the thoroughfare later known as W. Korfanty Avenue (then Red Army Street) was widened, and new buildings were erected along it. In the mid-1960s, Katowice Hotel was opened on the eastern side of the avenue, opposite the Separator office building of the Main Design Office for Coal Processing Plants. Adjacent to the latter, a shopping arcade, pavilions for the Bureau of Artistic Exhibitions, and the Wedding Palace were constructed. On the same side of W. Korfanty Avenue, the residential block known as Superjednostka was built. In 1971, Silesia Hotel was opened, and in 1972 a new railway station was erected in the block bounded by Młyńska, Stawowa, 3 Maja, and J. Słowacki streets.

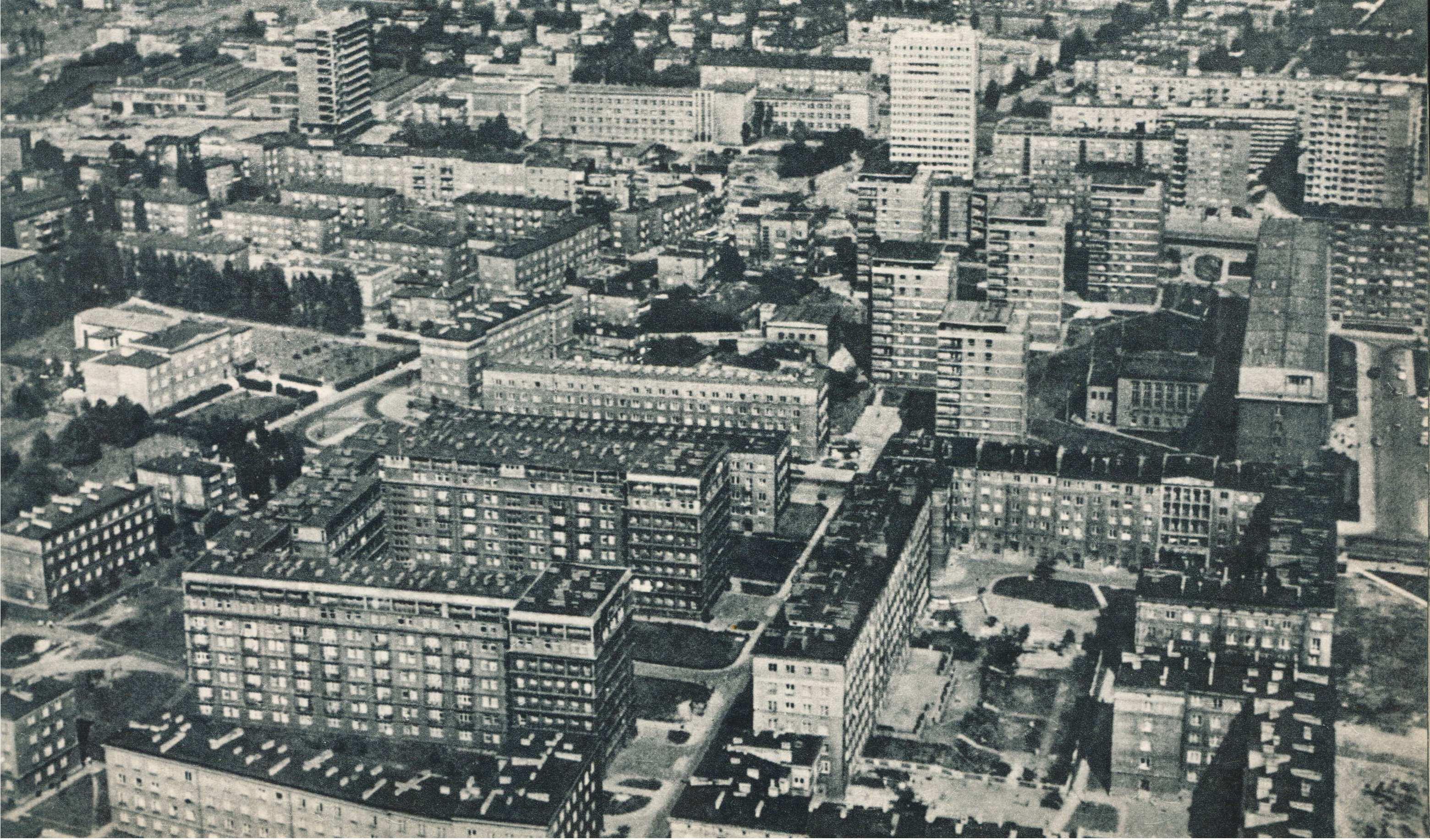
Fragment of J. Marchlewski Estate in the late 1960s

The aforementioned developments stood out aesthetically compared to the mass-produced structures built from the time of the Polish October onward.

Construction during the Polish People's Republic also extended beyond downtown Katowice. Immediately after the war, housing estates of Finnish houses were built (in Bogucice, Brynów, and Załęska Hałda). The first postwar housing estate in the city was developed in Koszutka – the Julian Marchlewski Estate. Ligota (Nowa Ligota) was further expanded, and additional estates emerged in various districts, including Tysiąclecia, Witosa, Stanisław Staszic (Giszowiec), Paderewskiego, Odrodzenia, Zgrzebnioka, and Kukuczki.

Church construction was notably active during the Polish People's Republic, with several structures of significant artistic value. Examples include the Church of the Transfiguration, expanded between 1975 and 1978, the Church of St. Hyacinth, built between 1973 and 1975, the Church of the Assumption, consecrated in 1983, and the Church of the Exaltation of the Holy Cross and Our Lady the Healer of the Sick, constructed between 1977 and 1993.

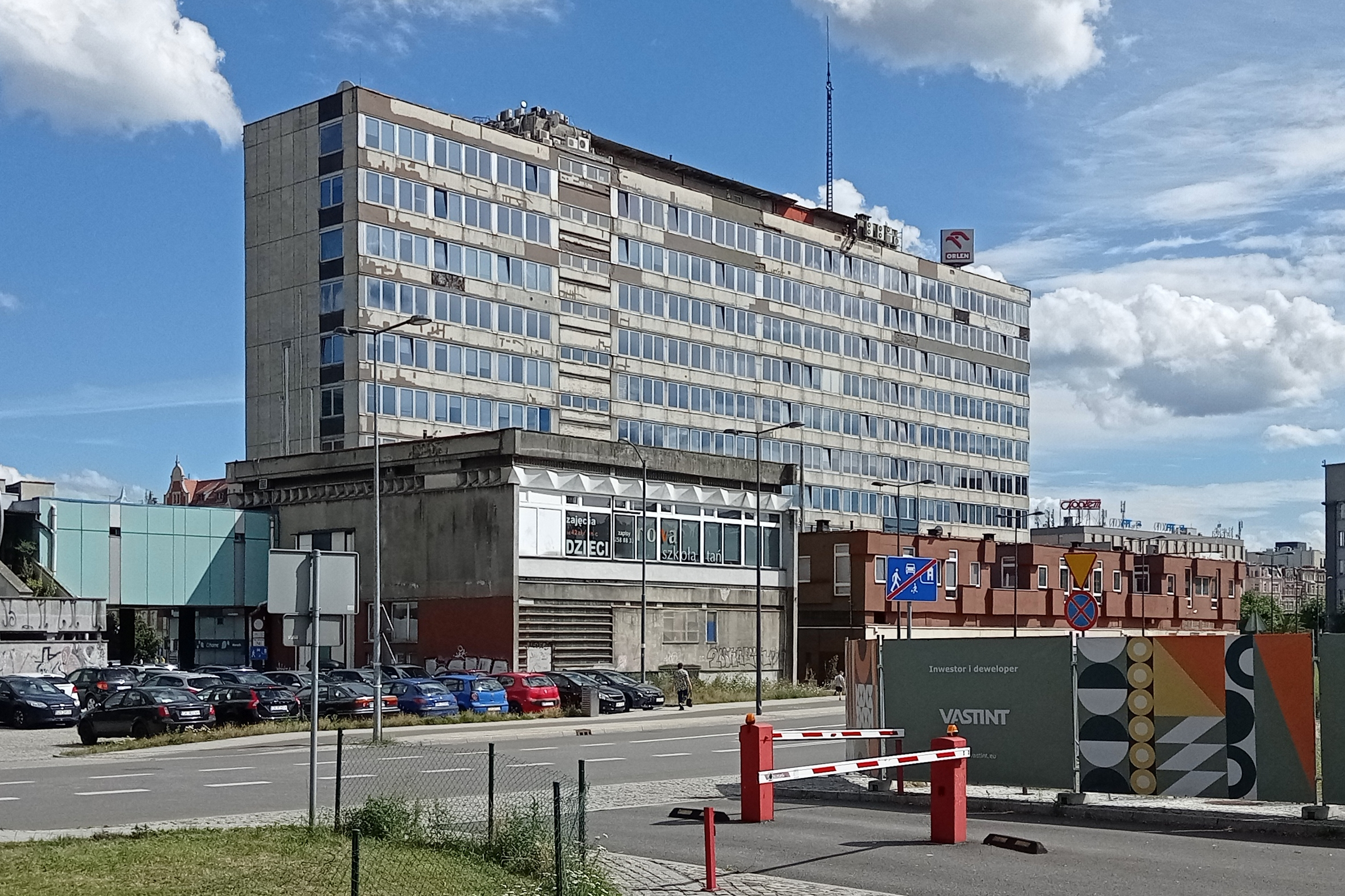
Separator (2 W. Korfanty Avenue)

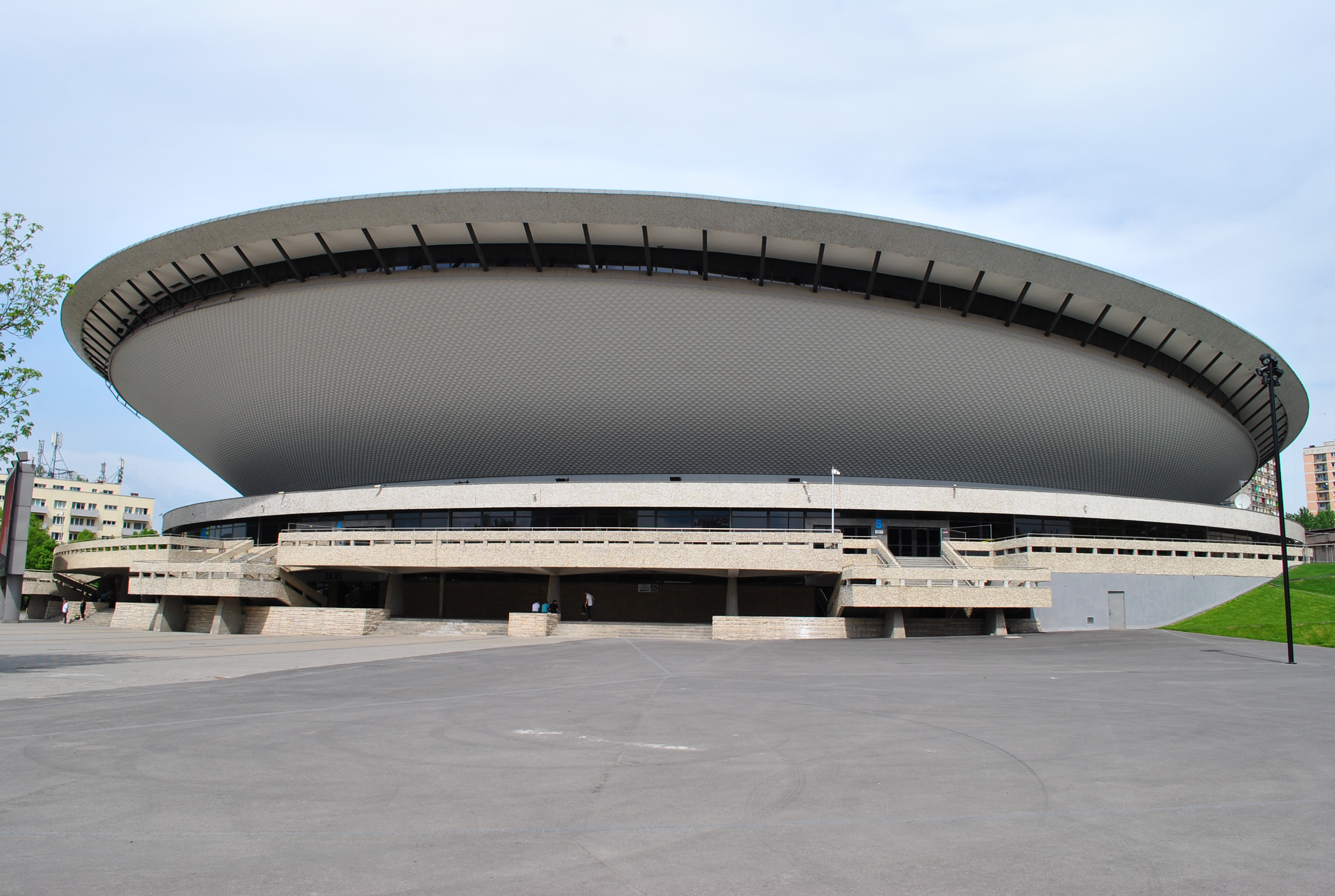
Spodek arena (35 W. Korfanty Avenue)

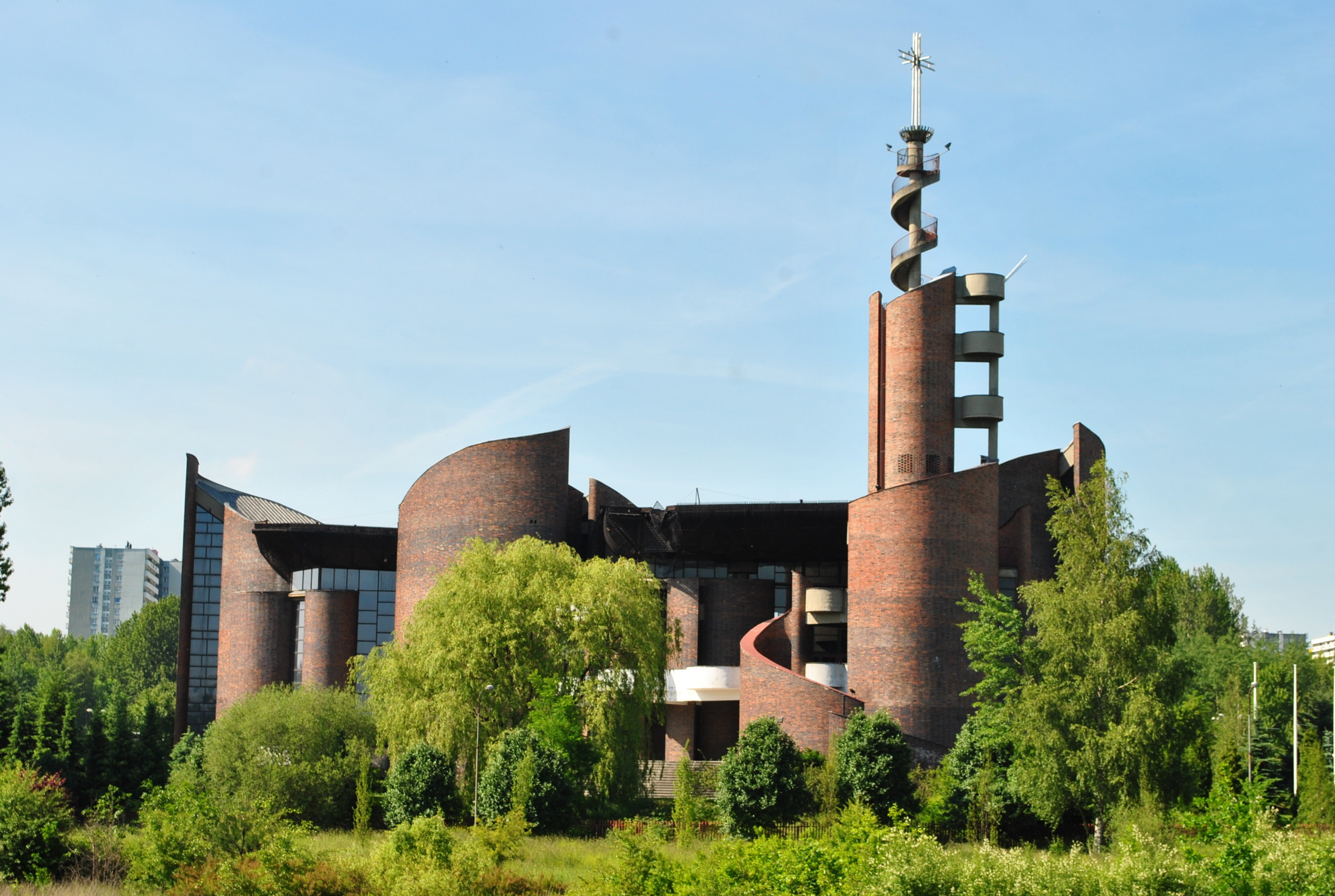
Church of the Exaltation of the Holy Cross and Our Lady the Healer of the Sick (Mieszko I Street)

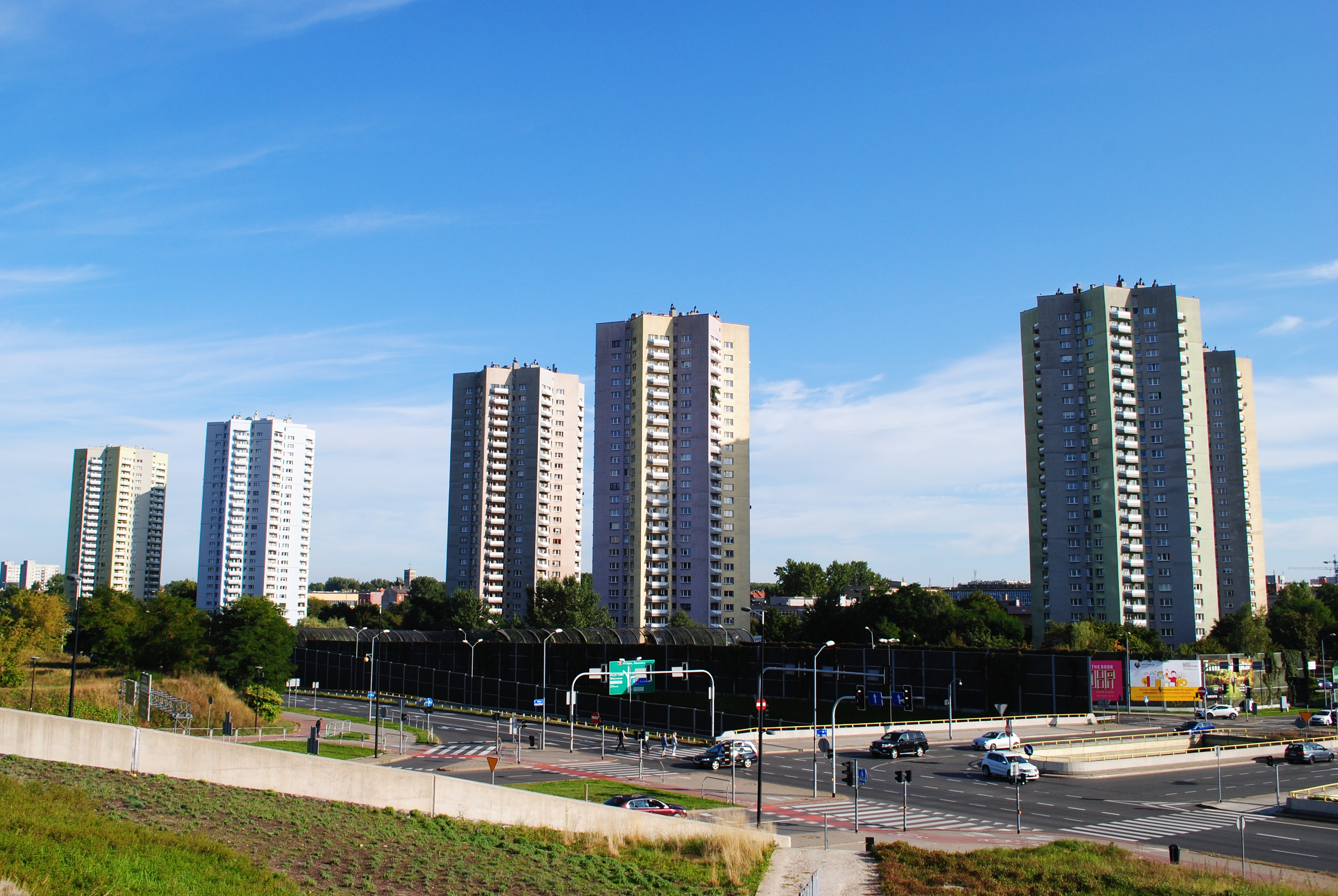
W. Roździeński Estate from the northwest (2020)

=== Selected buildings erected in Katowice during the Polish People's Republic ===
- Separator office building of the Main Design Office for Coal Processing Plants (2 W. Korfanty Avenue) – constructed between 1962 and 1965 (or completed in 1968) to a design by Stanisław Kwaśniewicz. This nine-story structure is linked to a complex of low single-story commercial and service pavilions;
- Delikatesy residential and commercial building (5 W. Korfanty Avenue) – erected between 1960 and 1962 (or in 1963) to a design by Marian Skałkowski. It comprises two segments separated by expansion joints: a ten-story residential block and a lower forward-projecting retail section;
- Silesian Press House (1 Market Square) – opened in 1963 or 1964 to a design by Marian Śramkiewicz. Originally characterized by a lightweight glass curtain wall screening the building above a recessed ground floor and first story, it underwent modernization between 2010 and 2014;
- Voivodeship Council of Trade Unions (23 Henryk Dąbrowski Street) – completed in 1955 in socialist realist style to a design by Henryk Buszko and Aleksander Franta;
- Spodek arena (35 W. Korfanty Avenue) – opened in 1971 according to a design by Maciej Gintowt and Maciej Krasiński. This multifunctional facility integrates varied spaces for sports and events; its dominant element is the main hall, shaped like a flying saucer, with seating for approximately 12,000 spectators;
- Katowice Hotel (9 W. Korfanty Avenue) – built between 1961 and 1965 to a design by Tadeusz Łobos. It consists of a low section housing dining facilities and a taller section originally containing 320 rooms with individual sanitary units;
- Church of the Exaltation of the Holy Cross and Our Lady the Healer of the Sick (Mieszko I Street) – constructed between 1977 and 1993 to a design by Henryk Buszko and Aleksander Franta. The church's volume is formed by rounded, dynamic shapes; distinctive features include its fan-shaped ground plan and an interior sculpture of the Crucified Christ by Gustaw Zemła;
- Osiedle Paderewskiego – housing estate in the area of Graniczna Street and I. J. Paderewski streets and Górnośląska Avenue in the Osiedle Paderewskiego – Muchowiec district. It was designed by Jurand Jarecki, Stanisław Kwaśniewicz, and Ryszard Ćwikliński. Intended for 20,000 residents, construction began in the early 1970s;
- Osiedle Walentego Roździeńskiego – housing estate built between 1970 and 1978, located on Walenty Roździeński Avenue in the Zawodzie district. It was designed by Henryk Buszko, Aleksander Franta, and Tadeusz Szewczyk. It features buildings colloquially known as "Gwiazdy" (Stars) due to their octagonal plans and was designed for 6,500 inhabitants;
- Osiedle Tysiąclecia – housing estate designed by Henryk Buszko, Aleksander Franta, Tadeusz Szewczyk, and Marian Dziewoński, with construction starting in 1961. Planned for 45,000 residents, it comprises high-rise blocks complemented by a complex of commercial and service pavilions;
- Palace of Youth (26 Mikołowska Street) – opened in 1951 in socialist realist style to a design by Zygmunt Majerski and Julian Duchowicz;
- Pavilion of the Bureau of Artistic Exhibitions (6 W. Korfanty Avenue) – officially opened on 5 January 1972 (or in 1969) to a design by Stanisław Kwaśniewicz. It is crowned by a sculptural frieze offering a modern paraphrase of ancient relief sculpture;
- Skarbek department store (4 A. Mickiewicz Street) – built between 1971 and 1975 to a design by Jurand Jarecki. It is characterized by a massive volume framed by spatially modeled bands enclosing the retail space;
- Zenit department store (12 Market Square) – constructed between 1958 and 1962 to a design by Mieczysław Król and Jurand Jarecki. This rectangular block distinguishes a glazed retail section; the office elevation is filled with uniform rectangular windows;
- Superjednostka (16–32 W. Korfanty Avenue) – residential building built between 1961 and 1970 (or between 1966 and 1970) to a design by Mieczysław Król. It references Le Corbusier's Unité d'habitation in artistic expression and structural solution, comprising three functionally independent tri-segment residential units;
- Ślizgowiec (8 W. Korfanty Avenue) – built between 1966 and 1968 to a design by Stanisław Kwaśniewicz with structural engineering by Tadeusz Krzysztofiak. Executed using climbing formwork with a mixed framework, it has 20 stories, two of which accommodate services.

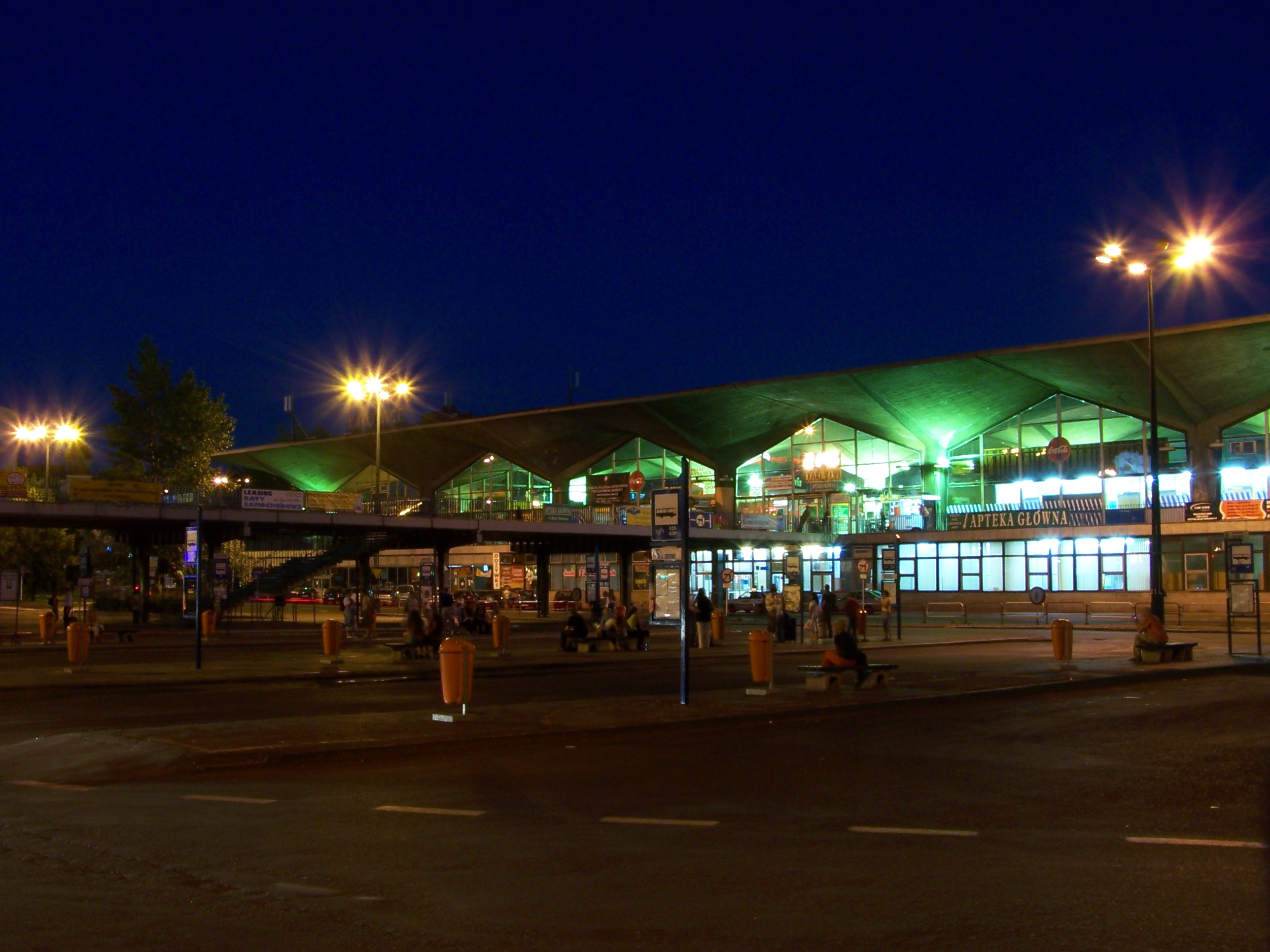
Brutalist railway station of Katowice railway station seen from the northwest (2006)

=== Non-existent buildings ===
- Regional Directorate of State Railways building (1 Walenty Roździeński Avenue) – erected between 1965 and 1974 to a design by Jerzy Gottfried. It consisted of three sections: a main slender 80-meter tower on a plan resembling two connected rectangles, flanked by lower one- and two-story blocks linked by a connecting passage. The structure was demolished between 2014 and 2015, and the site was redeveloped with the KTW office complex;
- Katowice railway station – constructed between 1966 and 1972 to a design by the Warsaw-based "Tygrysy" team (Wacław Kłyszewski, Jerzy Mokrzyński, and Eugeniusz Wierzbicki) in brutalist style. The station hall's structure comprised 16 interconnected reinforced concrete shells known as "chalices" supported on profiled columns. It was demolished between 2010 and 2011;
- Silesia Hotel (2 P. Skarga Street) – built between 1967 and 1970 and opened in 1971 to a design by Tadeusz Łobos and Jan Głuch, with structural engineering by Zenon Poniatowski. This tall ten-story building rose from a lower two-story base with a roof illuminated by skylights. It provided 262 beds, conference rooms, and various service facilities. The hotel was demolished in 2019;
- Wedding Palace (14 W. Korfanty Avenue) – constructed between 1966 and 1967 to a design by Mieczysław Król. It consisted of two two-story rectangular blocks connected by a passage, with elevations incorporating glazing and light-colored materials. The building was demolished in 2011; valuable relief sculptures were relocated to the Katowice Forest Park.

== Contemporary architecture (after 1989) ==
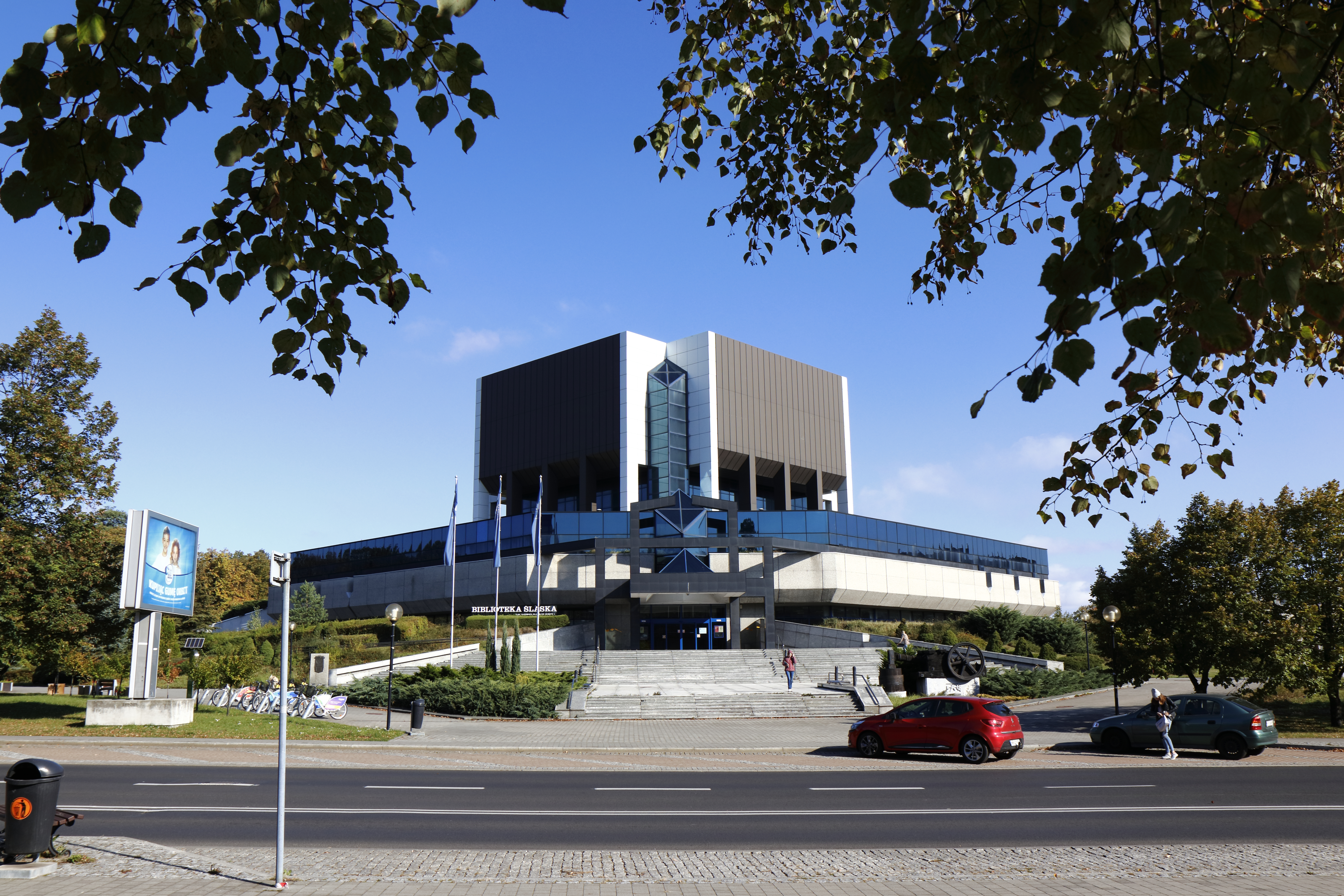
Silesian Library building (1 Council of Europe Square) in 2018

The systemic transformations in Poland after 1989 initiated a new phase in Katowice's architectural development. Architects explored fresh forms of expression, increasingly adopting postmodernist aesthetics, which had already begun to appear in the city during the 1980s. Examples include the Stalexport Skyscrapers complex, opened in 1981, and the Sadyba housing estate in Kokociniec, constructed around the turn of the 1980s and 1990s.

In the late 1990s, a new urban space formed adjacent to the Osiedle Paderewskiego – Council of Europe Square. The dominant structure became the Silesian Library building, opened in 1997. In its vicinity, two bank headquarters were erected: the Katowice branch of the Export Development Bank and the PKO building.

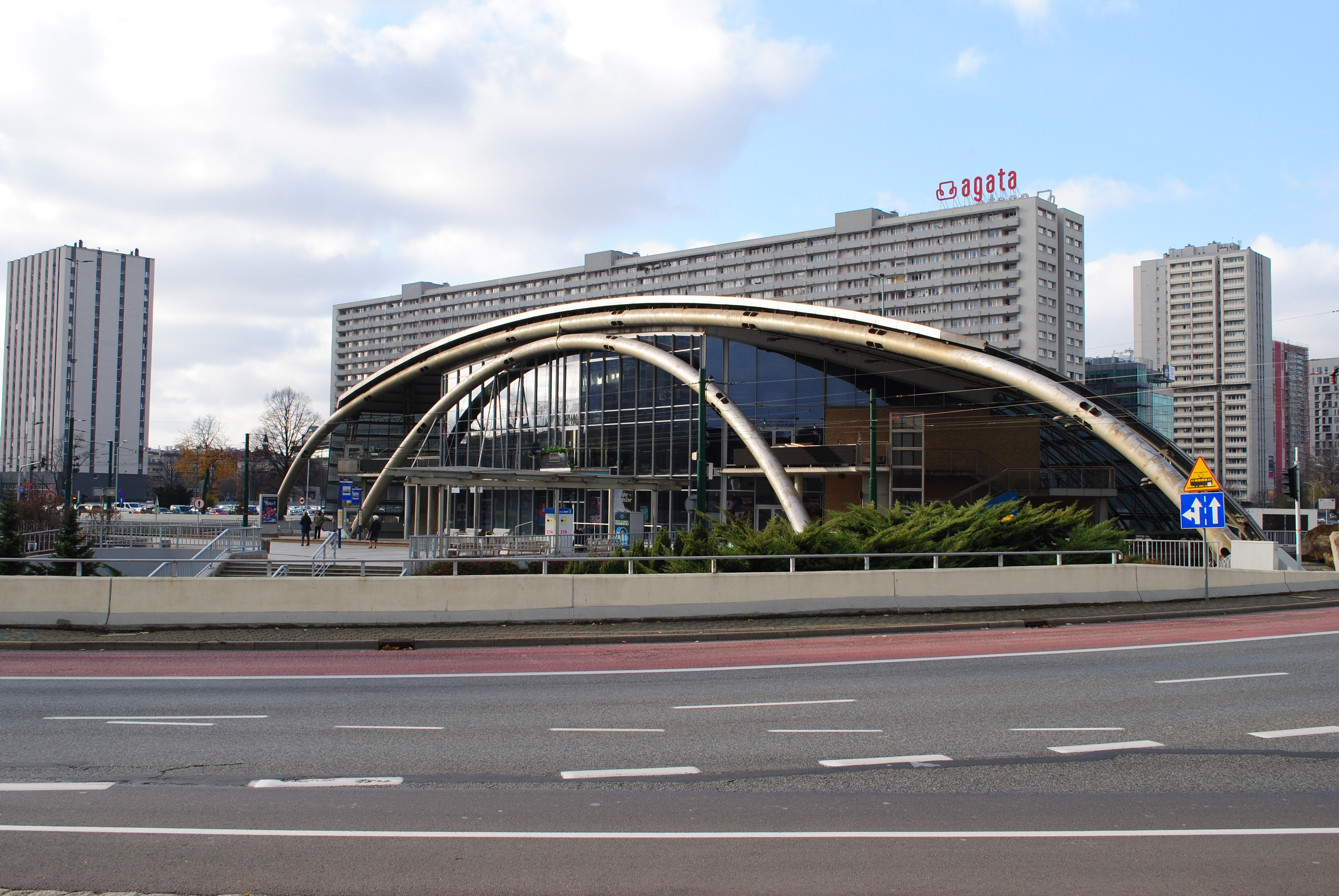
Rondo Sztuki Gallery in the middle of Jerzy Ziętek Square in 2020

Postmodernism's dominance in Katowice proved short-lived. The strong tradition of interwar architecture in the city led local architects to reinterpret functionalist principles, integrating modern structural and material innovations. Development in the early 21st century centered on Jerzy Ziętek Square area. The 30-story Altus Skyscraper was opened in 2003 on Uniwersytecka Street, followed in 2006 by a dome at the roundabout's center housing the Rondo Sztuki gallery.

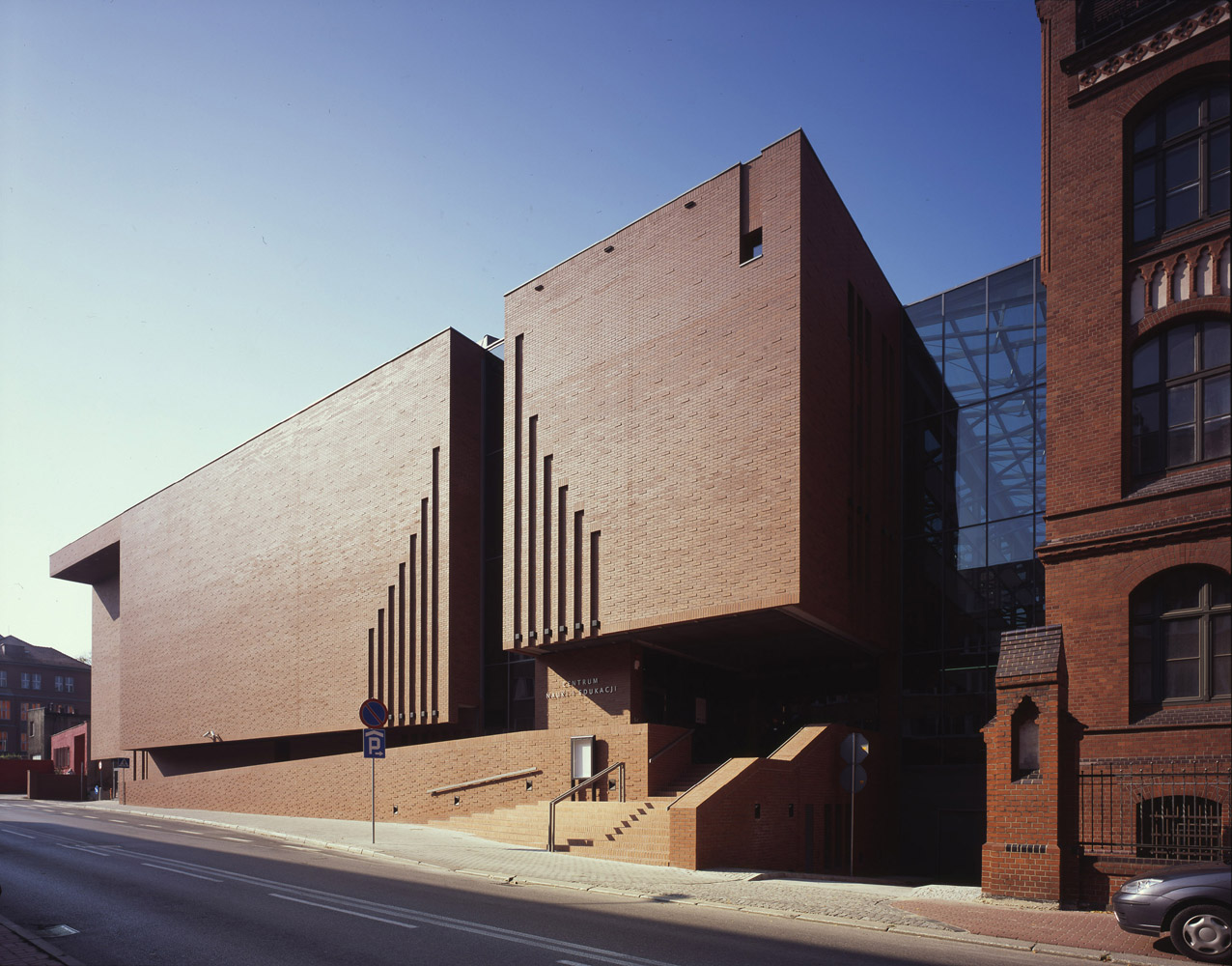
Symfonia Science and Musical Education Center in 2009

Contemporary architecture in Katowice has also referenced the region's industrial heritage through the adaptive reuse of protected post-industrial structures for new purposes and by incorporating industrial motifs into new designs. An example of such redevelopment is the Silesia City Center shopping and entertainment complex, opened on 18 November 2005, on the site of the decommissioned Gottwald mine. Others include an art gallery in the Wilson shaft of the former Wieczorek mine and the Silesian Museum, established on the grounds of the closed Katowice mine. New construction evoking industrial traditions includes the Katowice branch headquarters of the National Bank of Poland, opened in 2006.

The urban expansion strategy adopted in the early 21st century emphasized growth of the city center around W. Korfanty Avenue and Jerzy Ziętek Square. An architectural competition for a modern city center concept was resolved in 2006, with the winning entry by Tomasz Konior proposing a pedestrian passage on the western side of W. Korfanty Avenue incorporating shopping galleries, artists' studios, and a network of clubs and galleries. Subsequent years saw the completion of further notable structures, including the Symfonia Science and Musical Education Center in 2007 and the Katowice Regional Court building in 2009. At the same time, spontaneous urbanization progressed in the southwestern districts, alongside the development of new private residential estates.

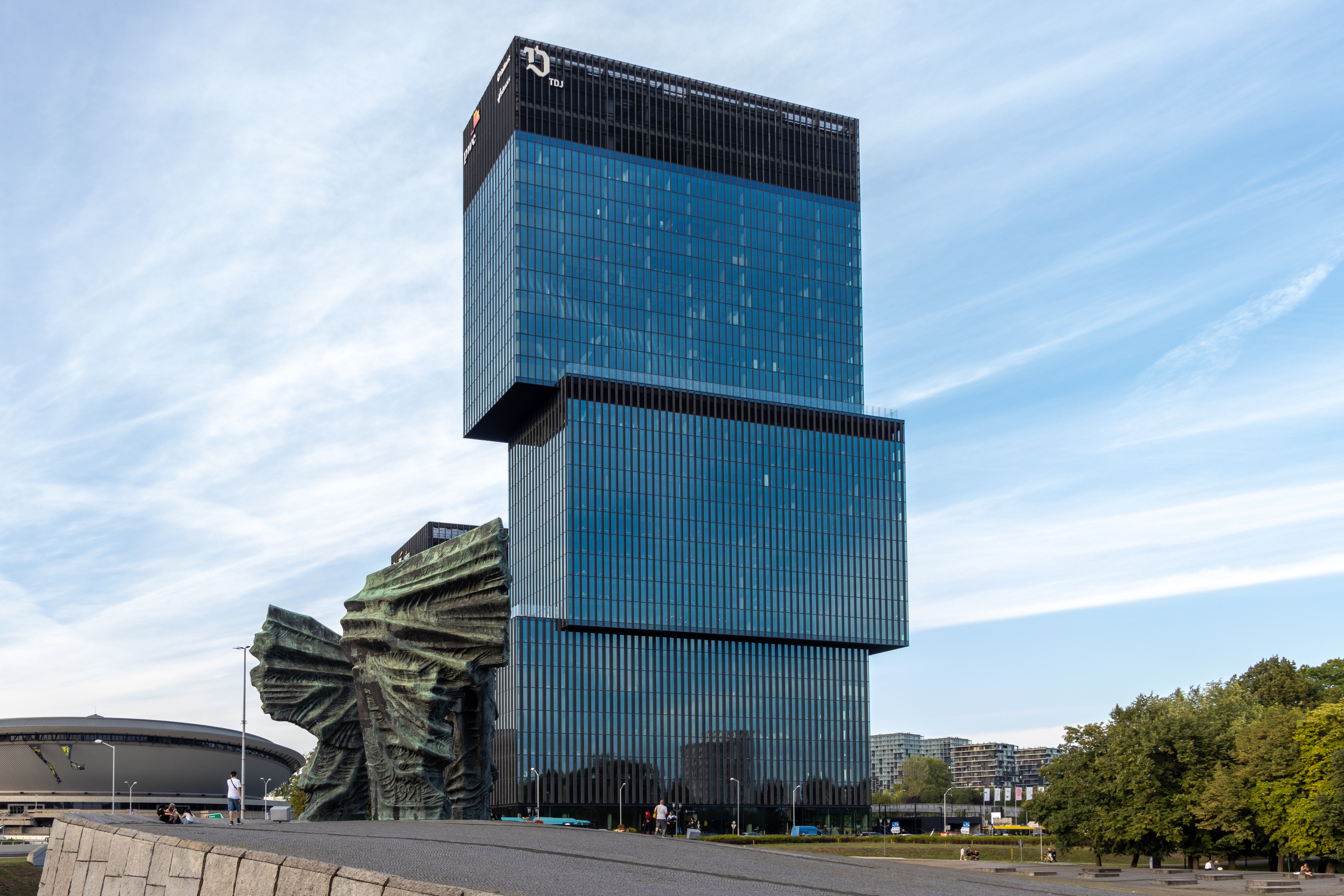
KTW office complex (1 Walenty Roździeński Avenue) in 2024

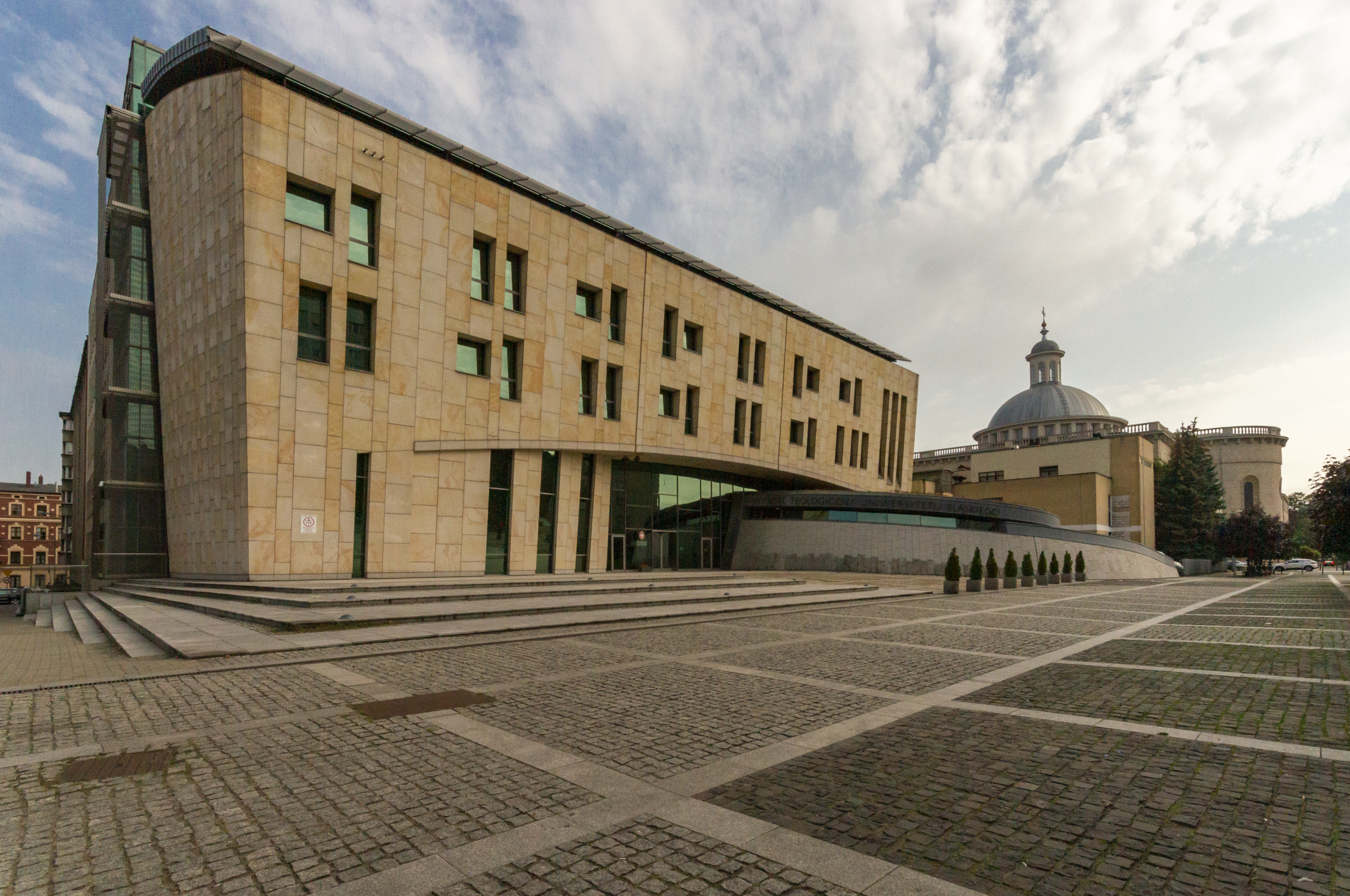
Building of the University of Silesia Faculty of Theology (2020)

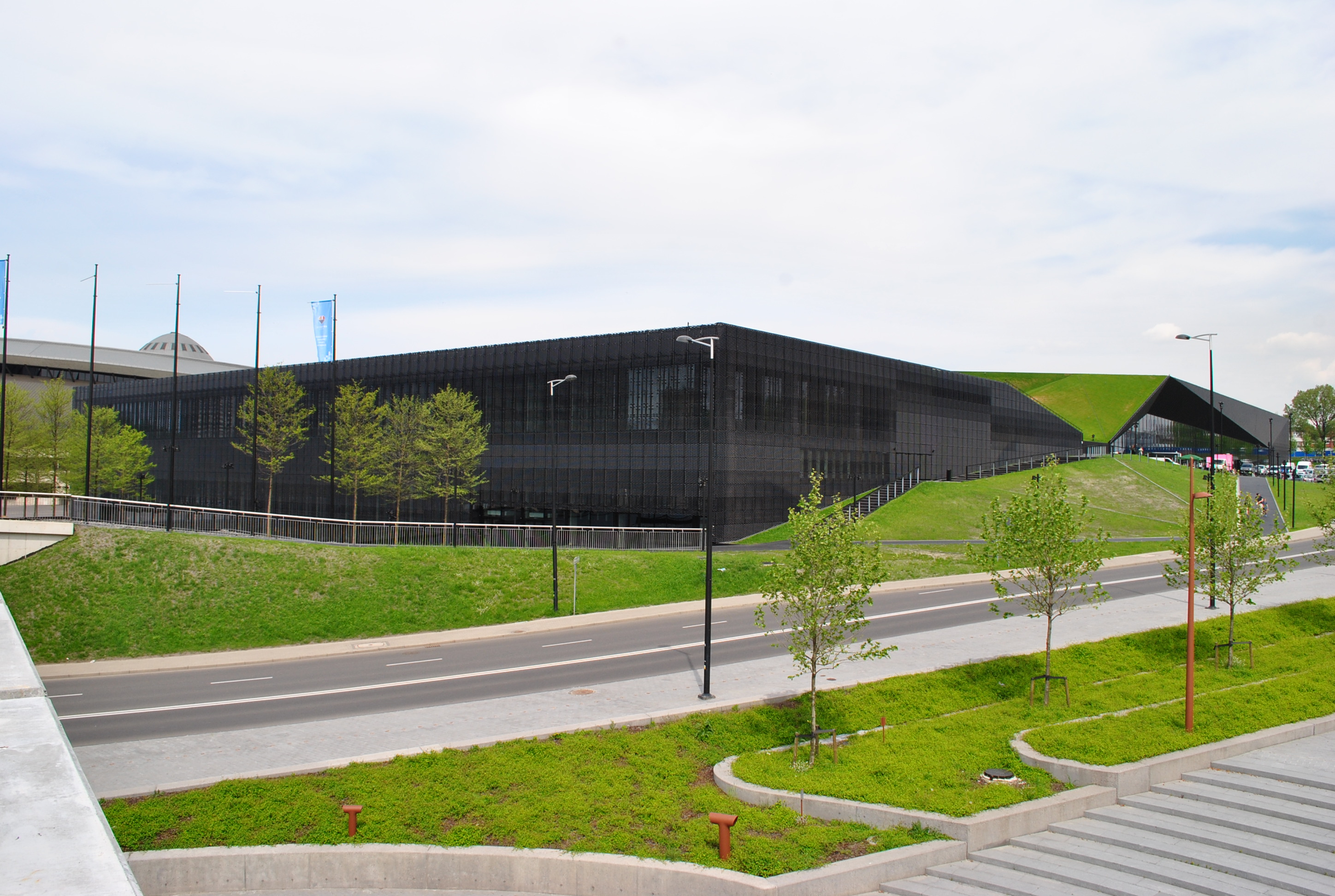
International Congress Centre (1 Sławik and Antall Square)

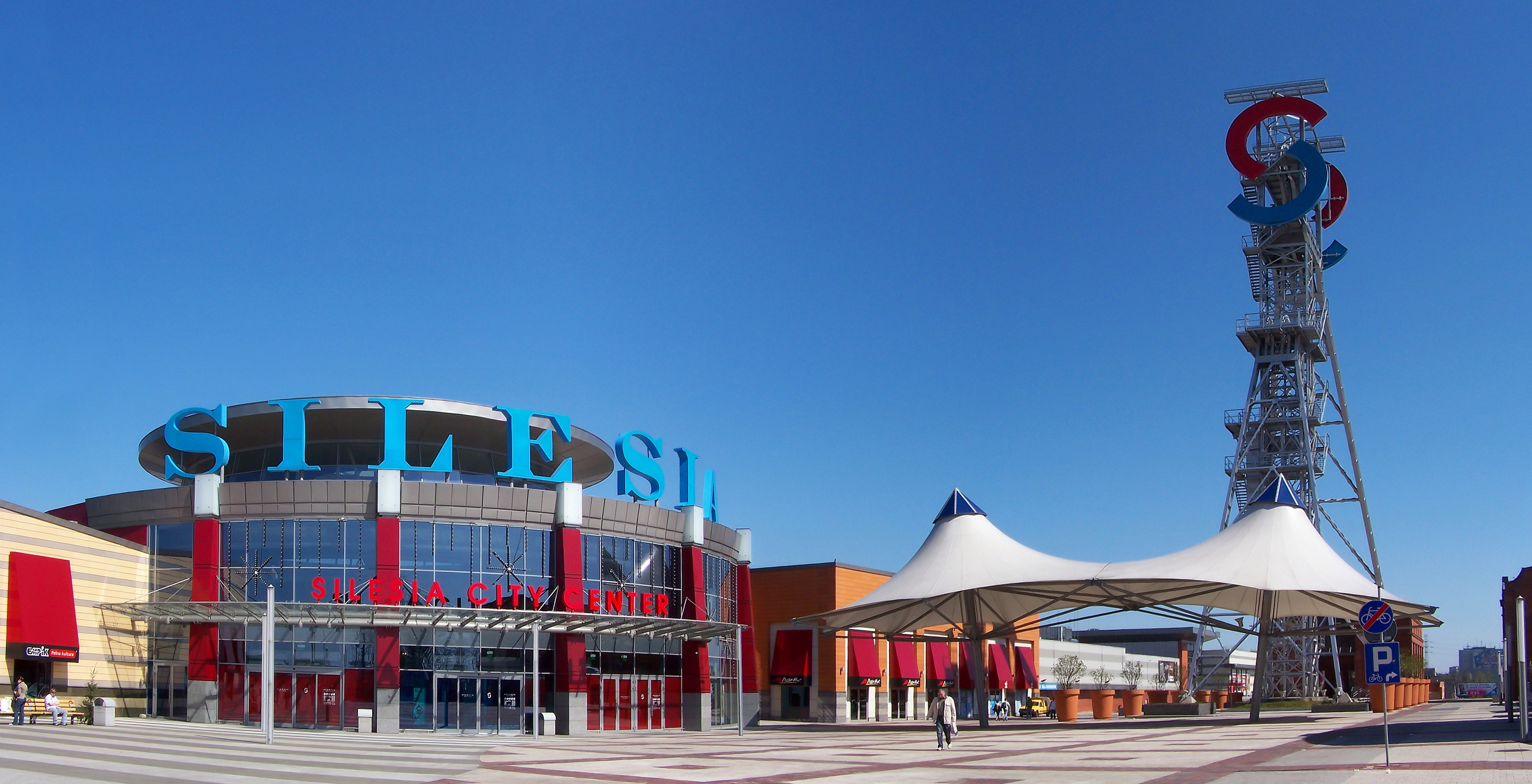
Silesia City Center in 2007

=== Selected postmodernist and contemporary architecture buildings in Katowice ===
- Altus Skyscraper (13 Uniwersytecka Street) – skyscraper erected between 1998 and 2003 to a design by Dieter Paleta. Reaching 125 meters in height, it consists of three volumes connected at the base by a four-story atrium;
- KTW office buildings (1 Walenty Roździeński Avenue) – constructed between 2016 and 2022. Comprising two high-rises of 66 and 134 meters, it was designed by Przemo Łukasik and Łukasz Zagała of Medusa Group. The buildings feature massive silhouettes divided into offset volumes;
- University of Silesia Faculty of Law and Administration building (11b Bankowa Street) – postmodernist structure built between 1998 and 2002 (or between 2001 and 2003) to a design by Henryk Wilkosz, Tadeusz Orzechowski, and Jacek Kuś. Erected on a semi-elliptical plan, its volume references industrial architecture and was developed based on the functional requirements of the faculty;
- University of Silesia Faculty of Theology building (18 H. Jordan Street) – opened in 2004 to a design by Henryk Wilkosz, Jerzy Stysiał, Tadeusz Orzechowski, and Jacek Kuś;
- Scientific Information Centre and Academic Library (11a Bankowa Street) – library building constructed between 2009 and 2011 to a design by the HS99 studio. This two-volume rectangular building has regular elevations clad in red sandstone with narrow windows;
- Symfonia Science and Musical Education Center (33 Wojewódzka Street) – opened at the end of 2007 to a design co-authored by Tomasz Konior, among others. It forms a unified complex with the historic Karol Szymanowski Academy of Music building, connected by a glass atrium;
- Chorzowska 50 (50 Chorzowska Street) – together with buildings at 34 Sokolska Street, forms an office and service complex erected between 2000 and 2001. The design references elements of Katowice's interwar modernism;
- Galeria Katowicka (30 3 Maja Street) and railway station – complex built between 2010 and 2012 to a design by the French firm Sud Architectes. It integrates the main Katowice railway station with reconstructed reinforced concrete "goblets", underground bus platforms, and the adjacent shopping mall;
- Silesian Library building (1 Council of Europe Square) – constructed between 1990 and 1997 in postmodernist style to a design by Jurand Jarecki, Stanisław Kwaśniewicz, and Marek Gierlotka. Built on a near-square plan with an internal skylight, its form evokes 20th-century concrete mine shafts;
- National Bank of Poland building (1 Bankowa Street) – opened in 2006 to a design by Wojciech Wojciechowski and Dieter Paleta. The architecture references the city's mining history, notably through black slate cladding on the administrative wing's exterior and the overall spatial arrangement;
- International Congress Centre (1 Sławik and Antall Square) – opened in 2016 to a design by JEMS Architekci. The building has a simple geometric form modified by a green roof; its primary space is a multifunctional hall of approximately 8,000 m²;
- Silesian Museum headquarters (1 T. Dobrowolski Street) – constructed between 2011 and 2013 to a design by the Austrian firm Riegler Riewe Architekten on the site of the former Katowice mine. The majority of the facilities are subterranean; in combination with preserved post-mining structures, they form a museum complex, while new above-ground elements consist of glazed rectangular prisms;
- Headquarters of the Polish National Radio Symphony Orchestra (1 W. Kilar Square) – built between 2010 and 2014 to a design by Konior Studio under Tomasz Konior. Rectangular in plan and clad in clinker brick that directly references Nikiszowiec, it houses a concert hall encircled by external spaces including an atrium;
- Silesia City Center (107 Chorzowska Street) – shopping and entertainment complex opened in 2005 on the grounds of the decommissioned Gottwald mine. The design was prepared by Bose International and the Stabil design office; the facility contains over 300 retail and service units.

== Monuments ==
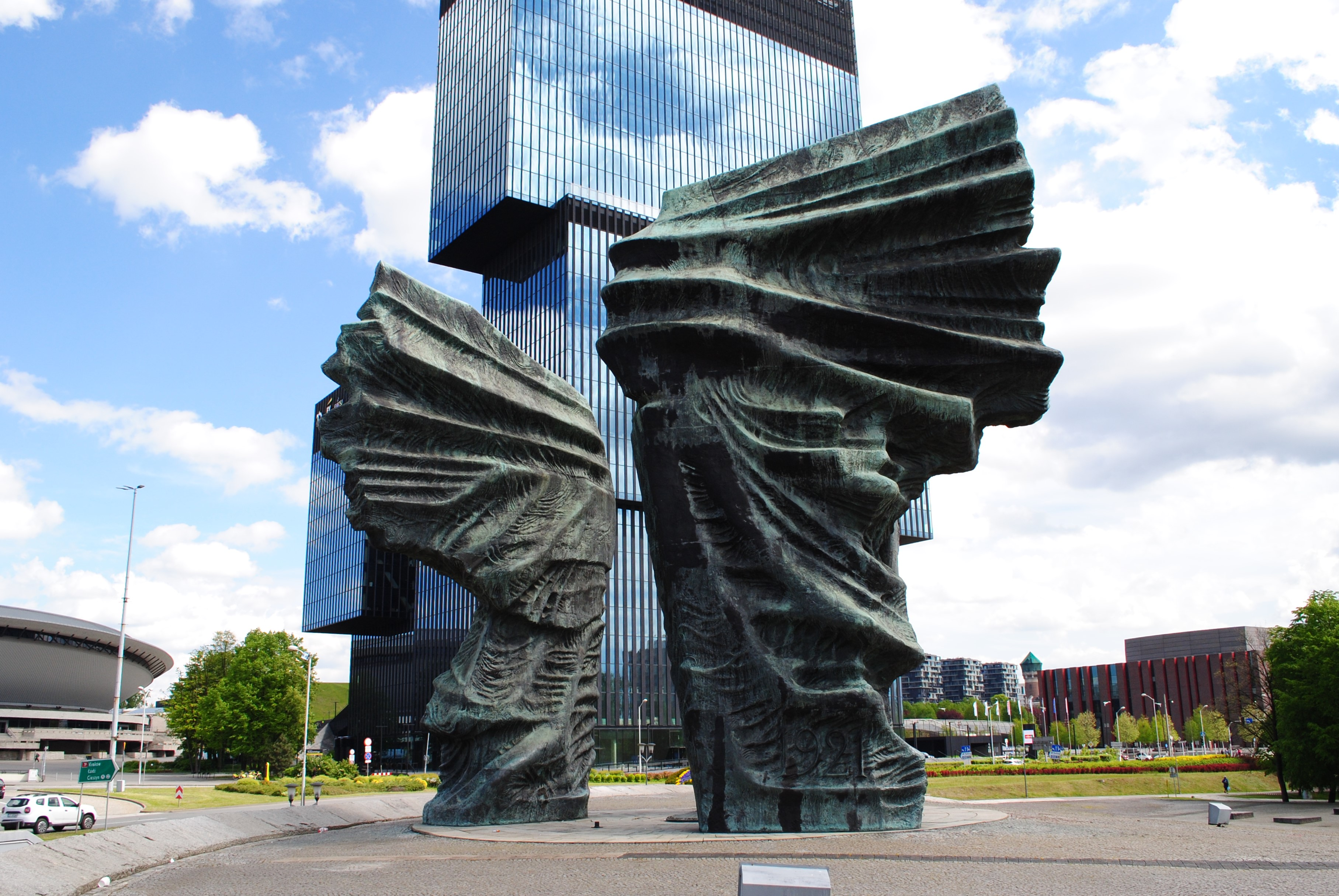
Silesian Insurgents Memorial (2024)

Katowice features both commemorative sites linked to specific historical events and symbolic monuments. Among the most significant are the Silesian Insurgents Memorial (at Jerzy Ziętek Square), the September Scouts Monument (Defenders of Katowice Square), the Katyn Massacre Victims Monument (Andrzeja Square), the monument to fallen miners at Wujek Coal Mine (Solidarity Square; Wincenty Pol Street), the Polish Soldier Monument (Polish Soldier Square), and the Parachute Tower (Kościuszko Park).

One of the oldest monuments in central Katowice was the statue of Saint John, dating to 1816. In the 1870s, it was relocated to Brynów due to the paving of St. John Street. A replica was placed at the street's outlet in 1999. In 1876, the redevelopment of Freedom Square was completed; its compositional centerpiece became the monument to two German emperors, Wilhelm I and his son Frederick III, erected in 1898. It was demolished by explosion on 13 December 1920. In its place, a Monument to the Unknown Insurgent was installed, which was destroyed during World War II. Also during that period, the monument to Józef Piłsudski, unveiled on the grounds of the Baildon Steelworks on 12 May 1937, was destroyed.

In the postwar period, monuments became a significant element of Katowice's urban landscape. During the People's Poland, they often served to promote communist ideology, leading to a predominance of state-commissioned works in public sculpture. These typically commemorated events from World War II or paid tribute to Polish and Soviet soldiers. An example was the Monument of Gratitude to the Soldiers of the Red Army, with its sculpture located on Freedom Square and designed by Stanisław Marcinów.

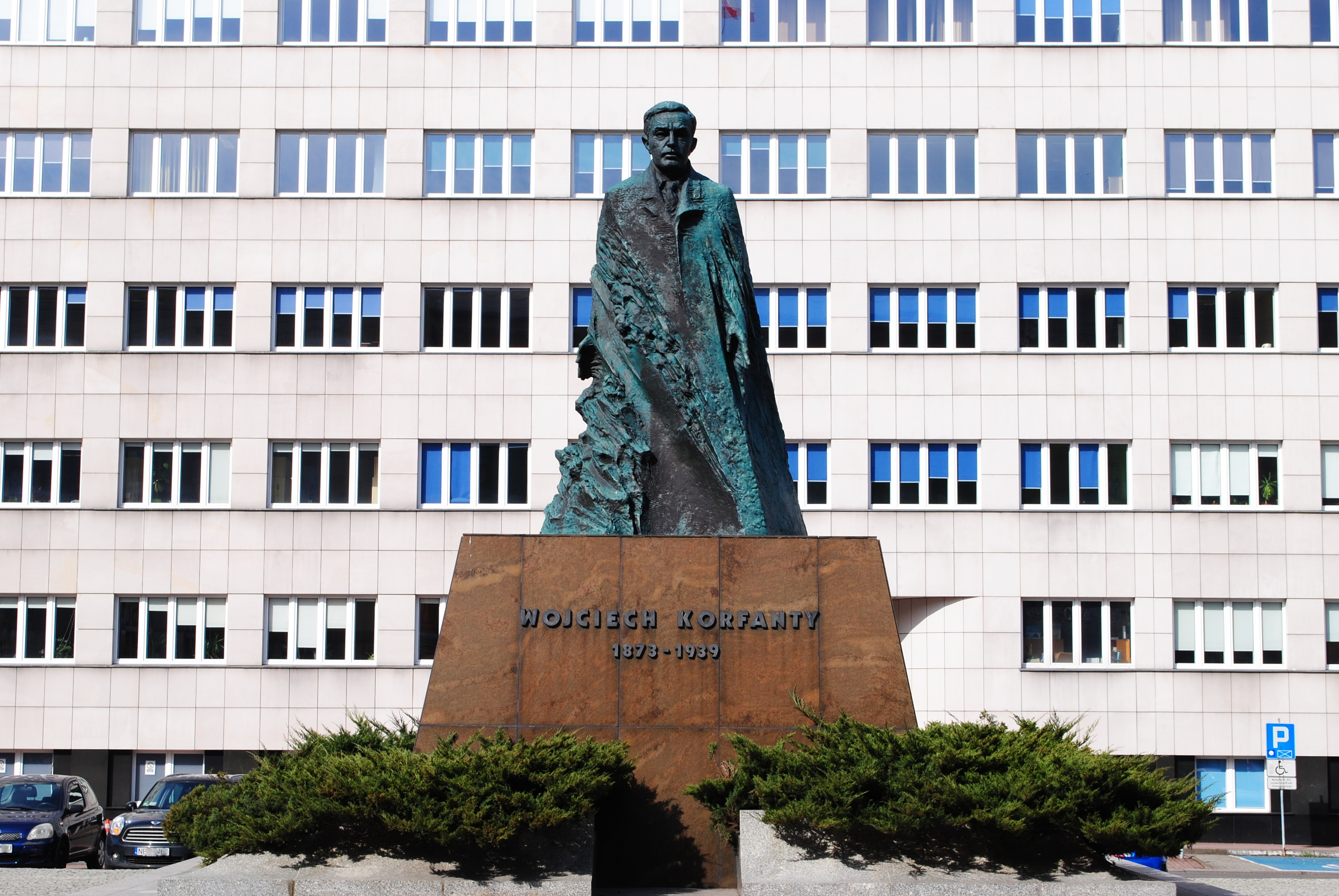
Wojciech Korfanty Monument (2021)

Over time, monuments of notable artistic value began to appear in Katowice, created by recognized sculptors. On 1 September 1967, the Silesian Insurgents Memorial was unveiled, designed by architect Franciszek Zabłocki and sculptor Gustaw Zemła. It was installed on an artificial embankment at the roundabout, with the names of localities involved in battles during the Silesian Uprisings inscribed along its edges. The Polish Soldier Monument, unveiled in 1978 and created by Bronisław Chromy, is also distinguished by its artistic qualities; the sculpture depicts an eagle shielding a group of soldiers with its wings. On 4 September 1984, near the Market Square, the September Scouts Monument by Zygmunt Brachmański was unveiled.

In 1998, the Wojciech Korfanty Monument, designed by Zygmunt Brachmański, was erected on Silesian Parliament Square. In 2014, the sculpture of the Soviet Soldiers Monument was removed from Freedom Square and relocated to the cemetery in Kościuszko Park.

== Cemeteries ==
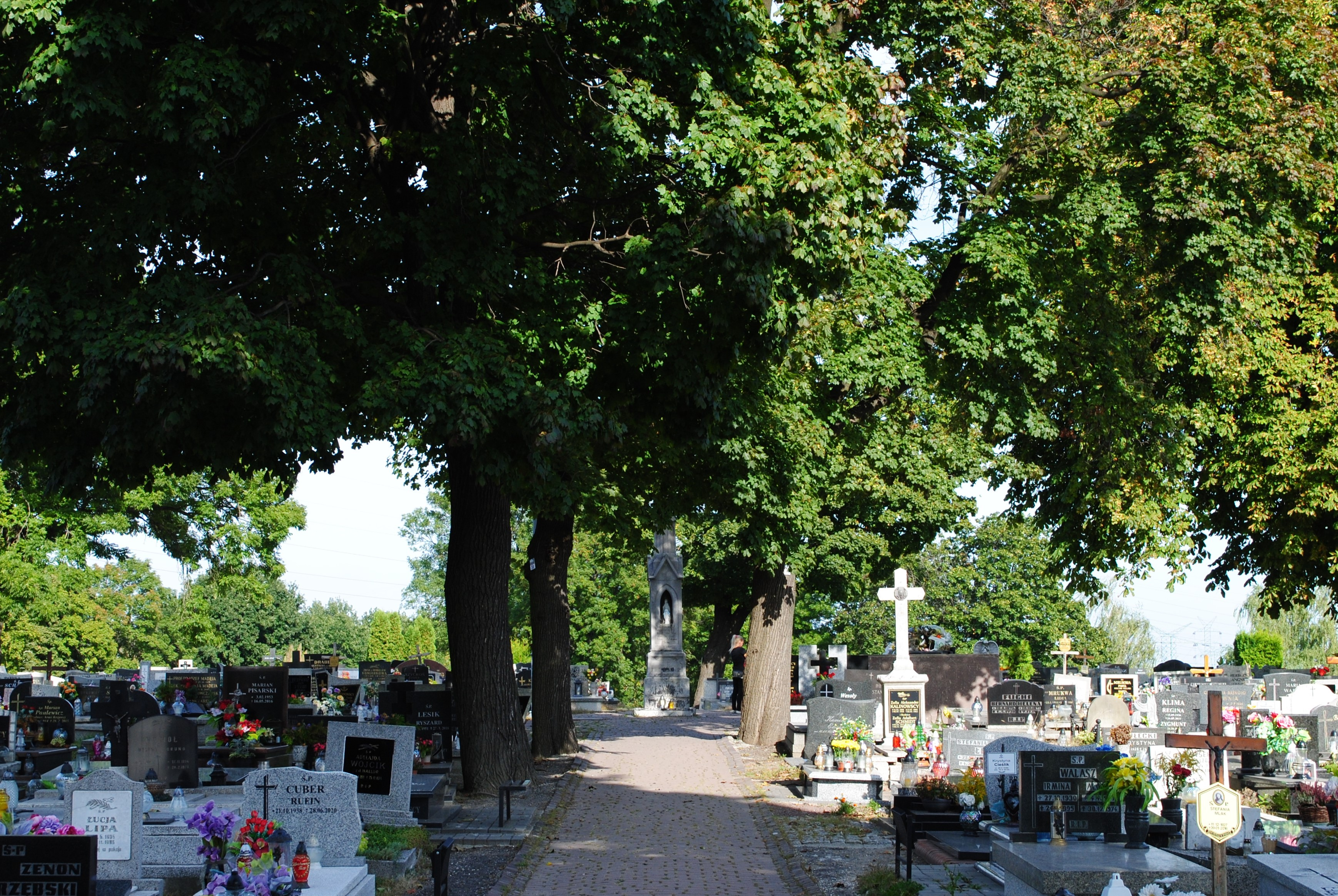
Fragment of Bogucice cemetery

Katowice contains approximately 25 cemeteries, including five municipal ones, with a combined area of about 75 ha. The largest is the Central Municipal Cemetery at 9 Murckowska Street. Separate cemeteries are maintained by the Roman Catholic, Evangelical, and Jewish communities, of which Roman Catholic cemeteries are the most numerous.

The earliest cemetery within the modern boundaries of Katowice was probably founded in Bogucice toward the end of the 14th century and operated until 1894. A chapel near the church served from the 18th century for burials of local nobility, and a second parish cemetery likely developed around it. Systematic interments there in the 19th century gave rise to the present necropolis on Walery Wróblewski Street. In the mid-19th century, a cholera cemetery was established in Murcki during the 1846 epidemic; it was closed afterward and has since ceased to exist.

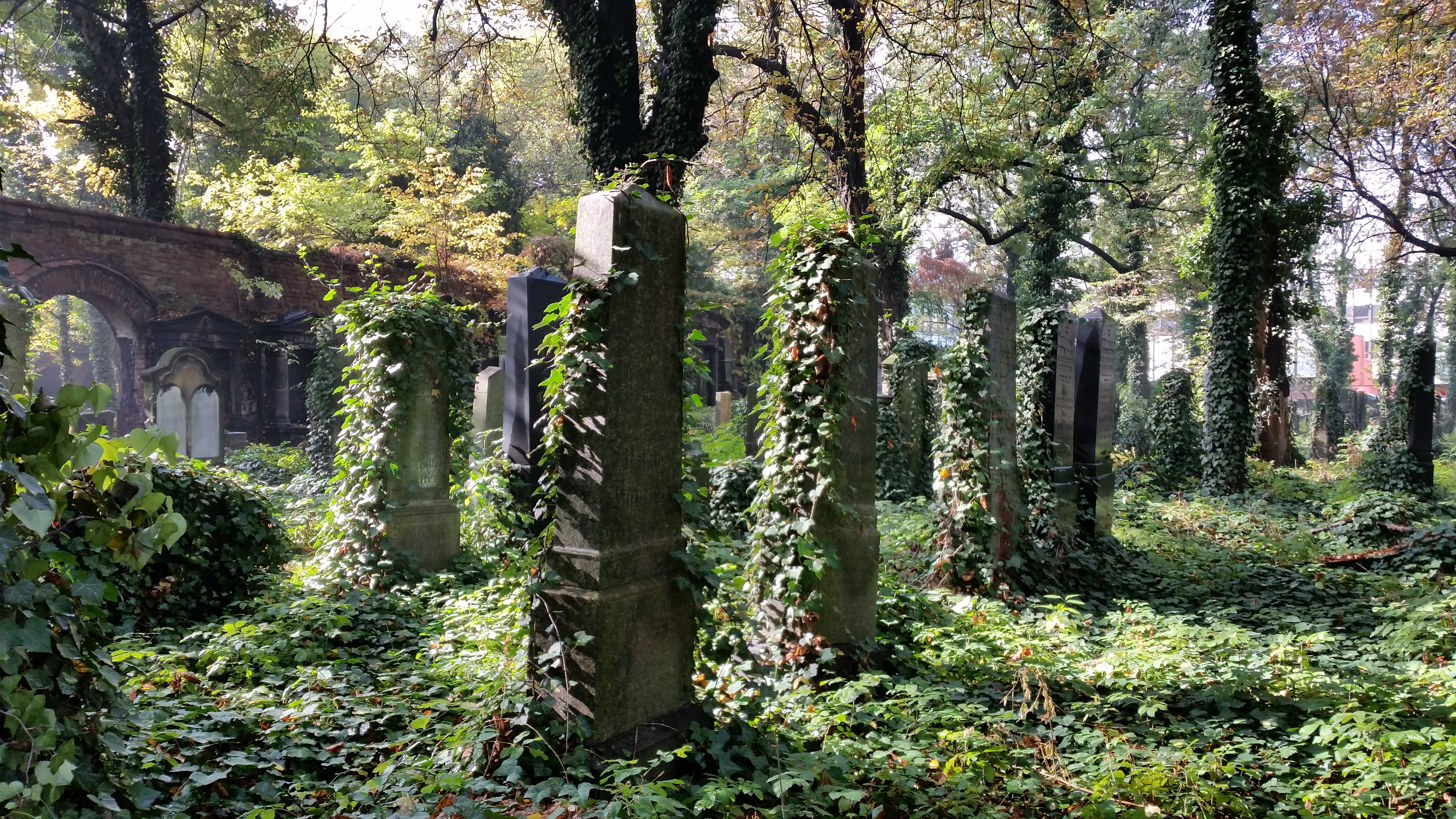
Jewish cemetery on Kozielska Street in 2015

In the second half of the 19th century, the construction of places of worship for different denominations – an Evangelical church, a synagogue, and a Roman Catholic church – was accompanied by the creation of confessional cemeteries. An Evangelical cemetery was established in 1856 at the corner of Konstanty Damrot and Francuska streets, a Jewish cemetery in 1868 on Kozielska Street, and a Roman Catholic cemetery in 1870 on Francuska Street. These represented the first permanent cemeteries in the city at that time. The original Evangelical cemetery has not survived. The original Evangelical cemetery has not survived.

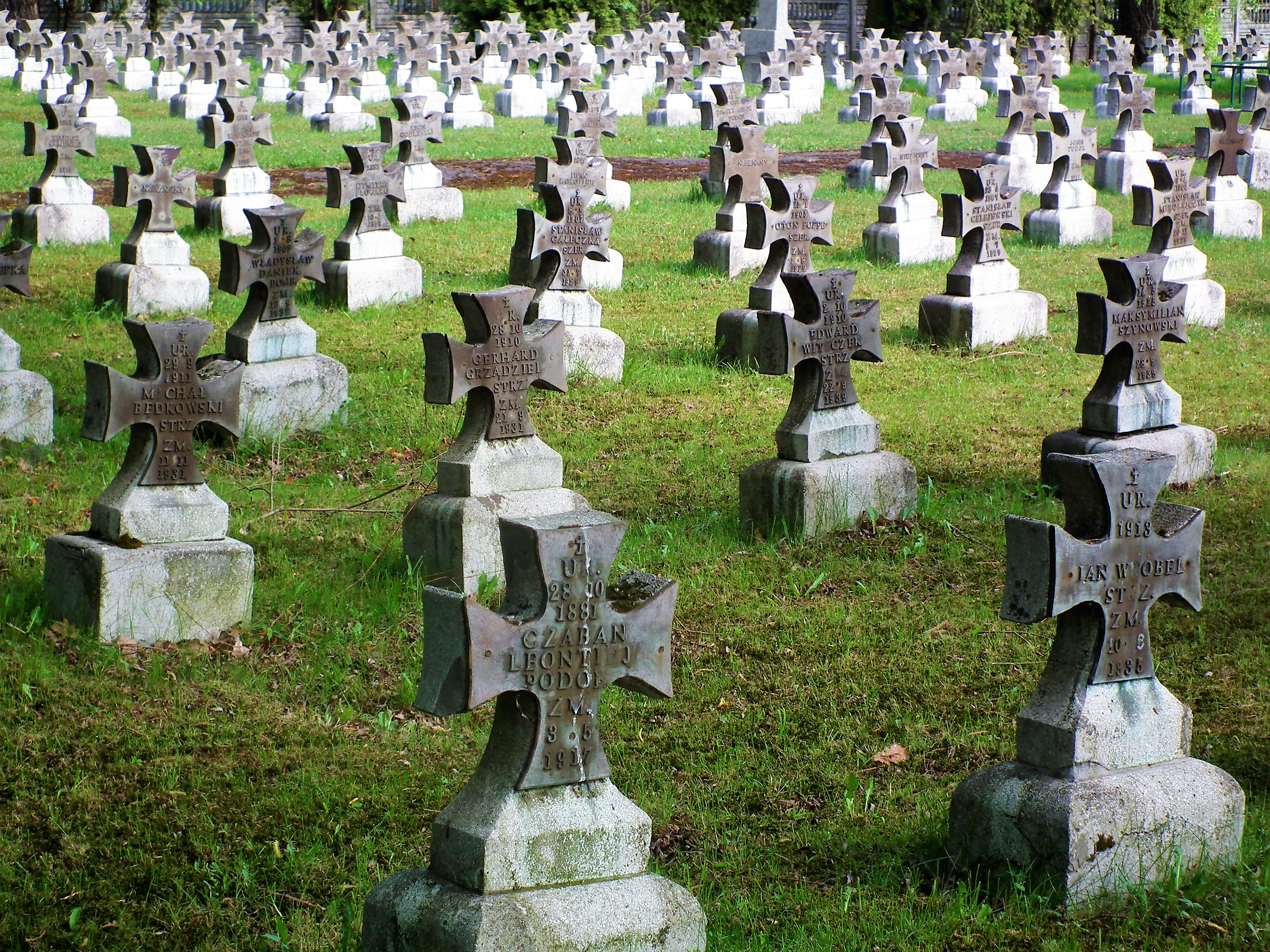
Fragment of the garrison cemetery in 2018

An earlier cemetery was established in 1860 on Gliwicka Street, serving burials from Katowice, Brynów, Załęże, and Załęska Hałda and Katowicka Hałda areas. Around the turn of the 19th and 20th centuries, the parish priest of the Immaculate Conception of the Blessed Virgin Mary decided to create a new necropolis on Henryk Sienkiewicz Street. It was opened on 1 January 1904. Toward the end of World War I, a garrison cemetery was founded on Ceglana Street under the care of the garrison parish. It includes, among other features, a collective grave for Allied prisoners of war who died in captivity.

Following the 1924 incorporation of neighboring districts, Katowice encompassed cemeteries in Bogucice on W. Wróblewski Street (dating from the 19th century), in Dąb on Bracka Street (established in 1894), in Ligota on 45 Panewnicka Street (municipal; originally Catholic, from 1907), and in Załęże on Pośpiech Street (from 1896). During the Polish People's Republic, as the city's boundaries expanded, additional cemeteries were incorporated, including those in Dąbrówka Mała on H. Le Rond Street (1911–1913), in Janów on Cmentarna Street (1910–1912), in Szopienice on Brynica Street (Catholic; from 1887) and on A. Kocur Street (Evangelical; from 1888).

In 1967, a cemetery for Soviet soldiers, established after World War II, was relocated to Kościuszko Park. It is the only fully closed cemetery in Katowice, where no new burials are performed. In 1984, due to increasing space shortages on overcrowded existing cemeteries, municipal authorities decided to construct the Central Municipal Cemetery on Murckowska Street.

== Skyscrapers ==
=== Characteristics ===
The urban fabric of Katowice is predominantly mid-rise, with low-rise development prevailing in the peripheral districts. High-rise buildings and skyscrapers are concentrated primarily in the downtown area and several residential districts. They cluster around Uniwersytecka Street (Altus Skyscraper) and A. Mickiewicz Street (Stalexport Skyscrapers, Global Office Park), W. Korfanty Avenue and Walenty Roździeński Avenue (KTW, Superjednostka, and Ślizgowiec), as well as Wit Stwosz Street (Wojewódzki Skyscraper) and Francuska Street (Francuska 70 Skyscraper). Additionally, such structures are found in the W. Roździeński and Tysiąclecia estates, and in the Koszutka district.

=== Interwar period ===
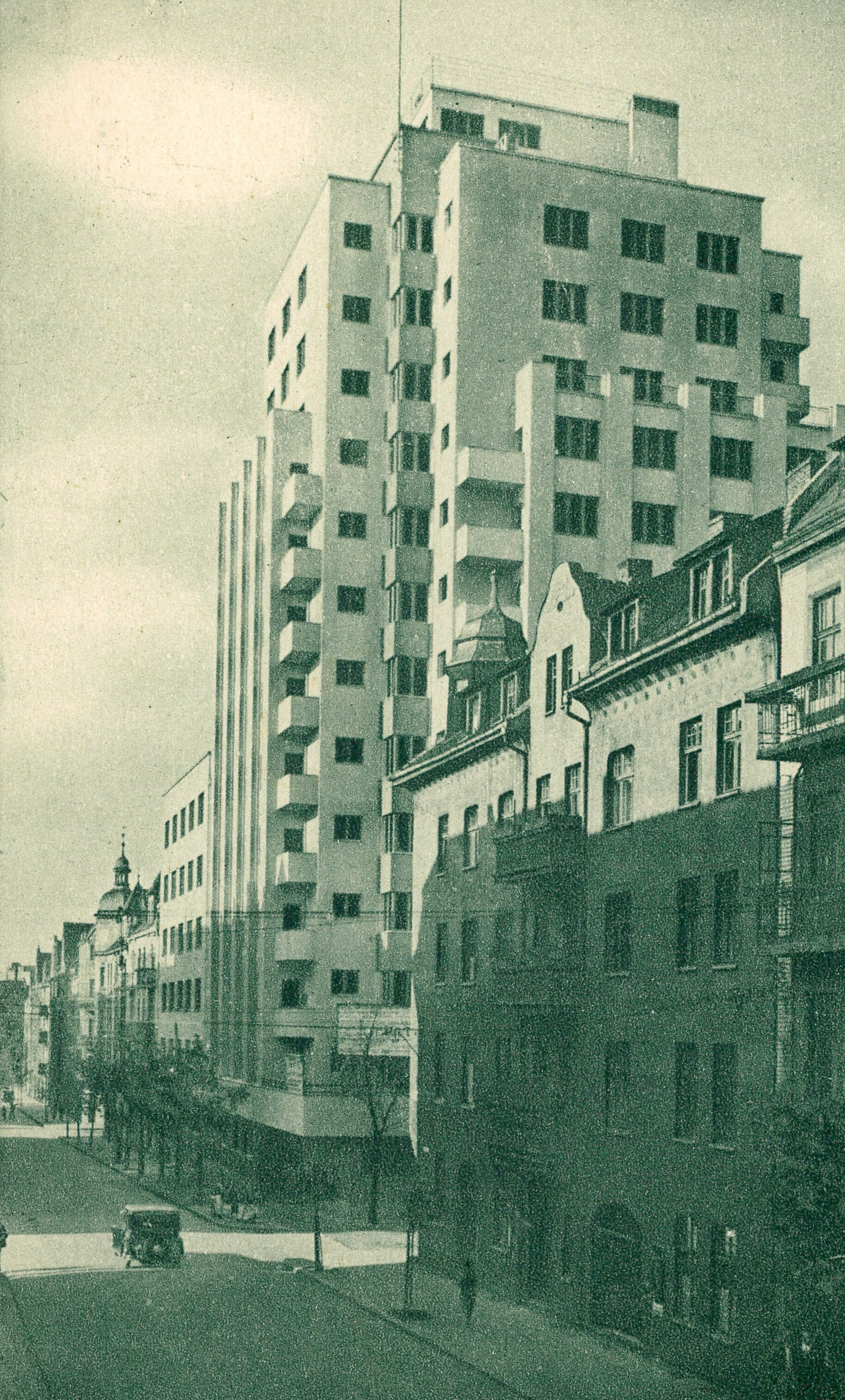
Tax Chamber building (so-called Drapacz Chmur) at the turn of the 1920s and 1930s

The origins of skyscrapers in Katowice date to the interwar period. Following the city's incorporation into the Second Polish Republic in 1922, Katowice became the capital of the autonomous Silesian Voivodeship, elevating its status as a decision-making center. Urban development during this era was directed southward, with initial plans for the city's new urban structure prepared in 1924 and 1930. In 1925, a competition was announced for the urban regulation and reconstruction of Katowice. The partially implemented winning design by Władysław Czarnecki and Marian Spychalski promoted, among other elements, high-rise construction – skyscrapers. This period coincided with the rise of avant-garde modern art movements in Europe.

One of the earliest attempts to introduce high-rise buildings in Katowice was the eight-story residential structure for employees of the Silesian Technical Educational Institutions, designed by Eustachy Chmielewski. Located at Wojewódzka Street, was opened in 1931, it remained the tallest building in the city until the construction of Drapacz Chmur. The professors' residence of the Silesian Technical Educational Institutions is regarded as the first skyscraper built in the Second Polish Republic. Prior to this, the only comparable structures in Poland were the 51.5-meter PAST-a skyscraper in Warsaw, erected in 1908, and the 35-meter Savoy Hotel in Łódź, opened in 1911.

In 1934, the Tax Office skyscraper on Żwirki i Wigury Street, known as Drapacz Chmur, was opened. Designed by Tadeusz Kozłowski and Stefan Bryła, its form drew on the principles of Bauhaus and Le Corbusier. Upon completion, Drapacz Chmur was the second-tallest building in prewar Poland, surpassed only by a few meters by the Prudential House in Warsaw, which stood at 66 meters when completed in 1933.

By 1939, several additional high-rise buildings had been erected in Katowice, including a multi-volume structure completed that year in the block bounded by H. Jordan, M. Skłodowska-Curie, and PCK streets. The taller section of this building has nine stories and reaches 32.9 meters in height.

High-rises became symbolic of Katowice during the interwar years, earning the city the nickname "Polish Chicago" in the 1930s. These buildings also served a propagandistic purpose, intended to demonstrate the economic and social strength of the Silesian Voivodeship to the rest of Poland and abroad – particularly to Germany – as evidence that Polish Upper Silesia was thriving. In this period, Katowice and Warsaw were the primary cities in Poland where skyscrapers were constructed before World War II, and a rivalry developed between them over possessing the country's tallest building.

=== People's Poland period ===
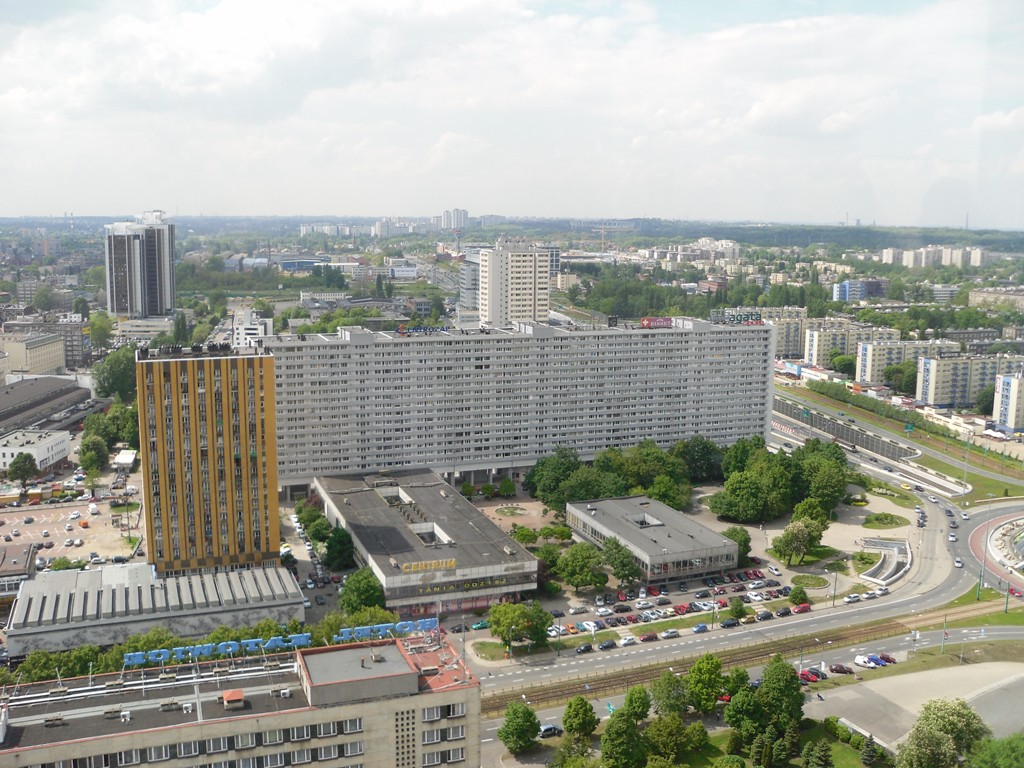
Fragment of downtown Katowice in May 2011 with skyscrapers from the People's Poland era visible in the photo: Stalexport Skyscrapers, Ślizgowiec, Superjednostka, and Haperowiec

In the early years of People's Poland, socialist realism was mandated in architecture toward the end of the 1940s, rejecting the interwar International Style prevalent in Katowice. This phase, however, was brief. After 1956, the vision for Śródmieście evolved toward dispersed development with varied volumes, incorporating numerous high-rises as visual landmarks symbolizing the city's metropolitan status. Contemporary media often highlighted both the symbolic and practical roles of these skyscrapers, noting their efficient use of land.

A 1954 competition for central Katowice selected a concept by Wiktor Lipowczan, Zygmunt Majerski, Ernest Szary, and Adam Woźniak. It positioned the city center around Market Square, connected to a roundabout completed in 1965 linking routes to Chorzów, Siemianowice Śląskie, and Sosnowiec, alongside a major artery (later W. Korfanty Avenue), which gradually acquired modern structures.

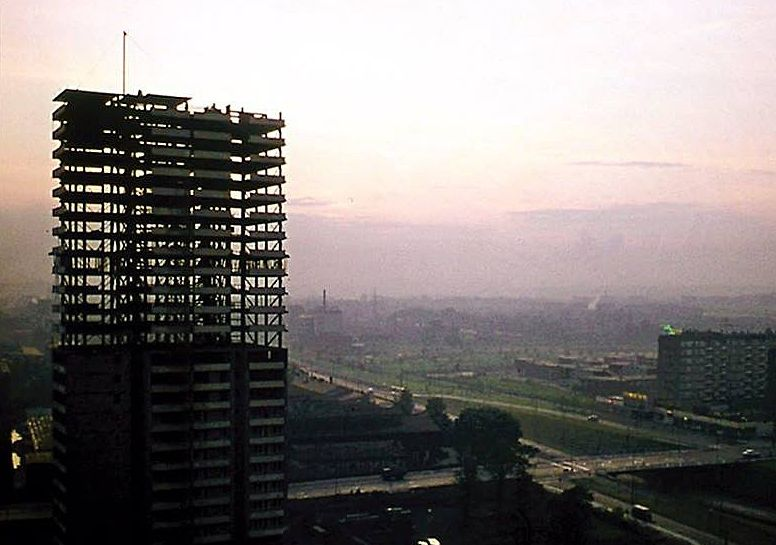
Construction of Haperowiec in 1968

Between 1966 and 1968, Ślizgowiec, the first postwar 20-story skyscraper, was built to a design by Stanisław Kwaśniewicz and Tadeusz Krzysztofiak. The western side of W. Korfanty Avenue was framed by Superjednostka residential building (1961–1970), designed by Mieczysław Król and inspired by Le Corbusier's Unité d'habitation. In 1970, Haperowiec became the first occupied building in Katowice exceeding 20 stories.

The area around Jerzy Ziętek Square gained particular urban significance in the 1960s and 1970s. Adjacent to the Spodek arena, the high-rise office building for the Silesian Regional Directorate of State Railways, designed by Jerzy Gottfried, was erected. It provided horizontal correspondence with Spodek and was intended by the architect to reference Oscar Niemeyer's National Congress Palace.

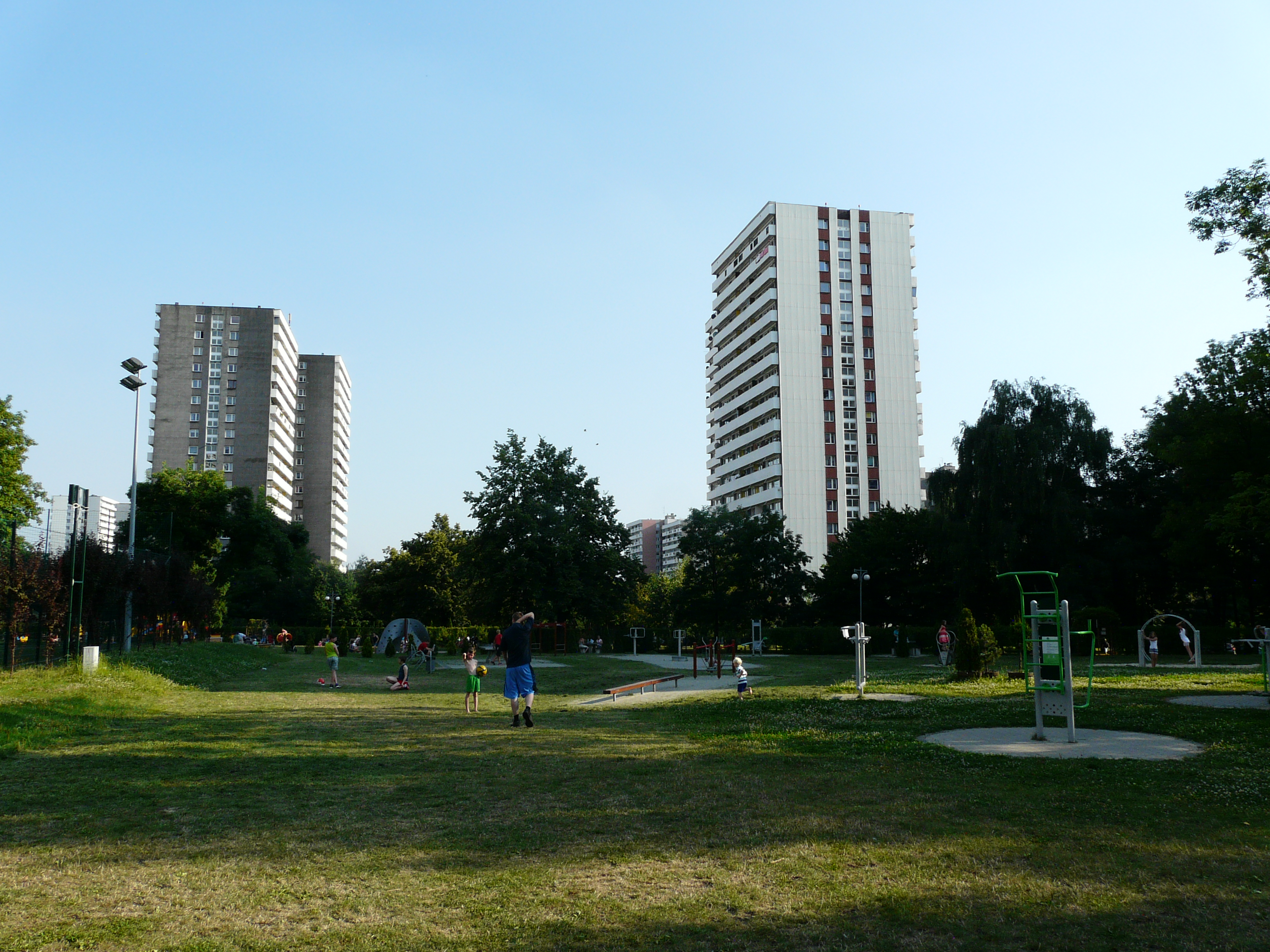
Fragment of upper Osiedle Tysiąclecia (Tysiąclecia Street area) in 2013

The buildings along the Jerzy Ziętek Square and Market Square axis stand out for their quality compared to the mass housing construction of the period, which relied heavily on large-panel-system building for affordable residential development. In the 1960s and 1970s, estates such as Osiedle Kopalniana and Osiedle Paderewskiego were realized. Distinctive for its creative individualism is Osiedle Tysiąclecia, designed by Henryk Buszko, Aleksander Franta, Marian Dziewoński, and Tadeusz Szewczyk. The project featured high-rise blocks reaching up to 25 stories. The estate also includes a group of five towers whose concave-convex surfaces metaphorically evoke corn cobs, earning them the nickname "Kukurydze" (Corncobs). Their form references the earlier twin towers of Marina City in Chicago. The first "Kukurydza" was commissioned in 1988. The same architectural team designed Osiedle Walentego Roździeńskiego, also known as "Stars" estate, built along W. Roździeński Avenue between 1970 and 1978. It comprises seven residential high-rises on an eight-pointed star plan.

The 1980s in Katowice's architecture marked a shift away from International Style and constructivism toward postmodernist ideas emphasizing formally diverse volumes. Early signs of this trend appeared in 1981 with the commissioning of the Stalexport Skyscrapers, designed by Đorđe Grujičić from the KMG Trudbenik office in Belgrade. These are trunk-line high-rises, a type relatively rare in Europe; their prototype was the Torres de Colón in Madrid. Another skyscraper from the 1980s, Wojewódzki Skyscraper on Wit Stwosz Street, was completed in 1985.

=== Period after 1989 ===
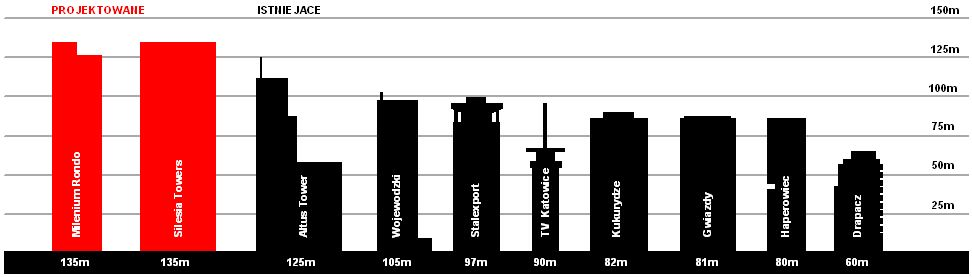
Diagram of the tallest buildings in Katowice in 2006; in red the then-planned Millennium Roundabout and Silesia Towers

The 1990s saw a temporary halt in Katowice's urban growth, including high-rise construction. The remaining "Kukurydze" towers were completed, along with several lower structures. A renewed construction boom emerged around the turn of the 20th and 21st centuries, aligning the city with a broader trend in major Polish urban centers toward increased high-rise development. The Building Department of the Katowice City Office approved multiple projects aimed at reshaping the city's architectural and urban profile, centering on the area around Jerzy Ziętek Square. Planned developments included two office towers adjacent to Silesia City Center – Silesia Towers at 165 and 135 meters – and a 27-story mixed-use building at 18 Sokolska Street (Jupiter Plaza), designed by Wojciech Wojciechowski.

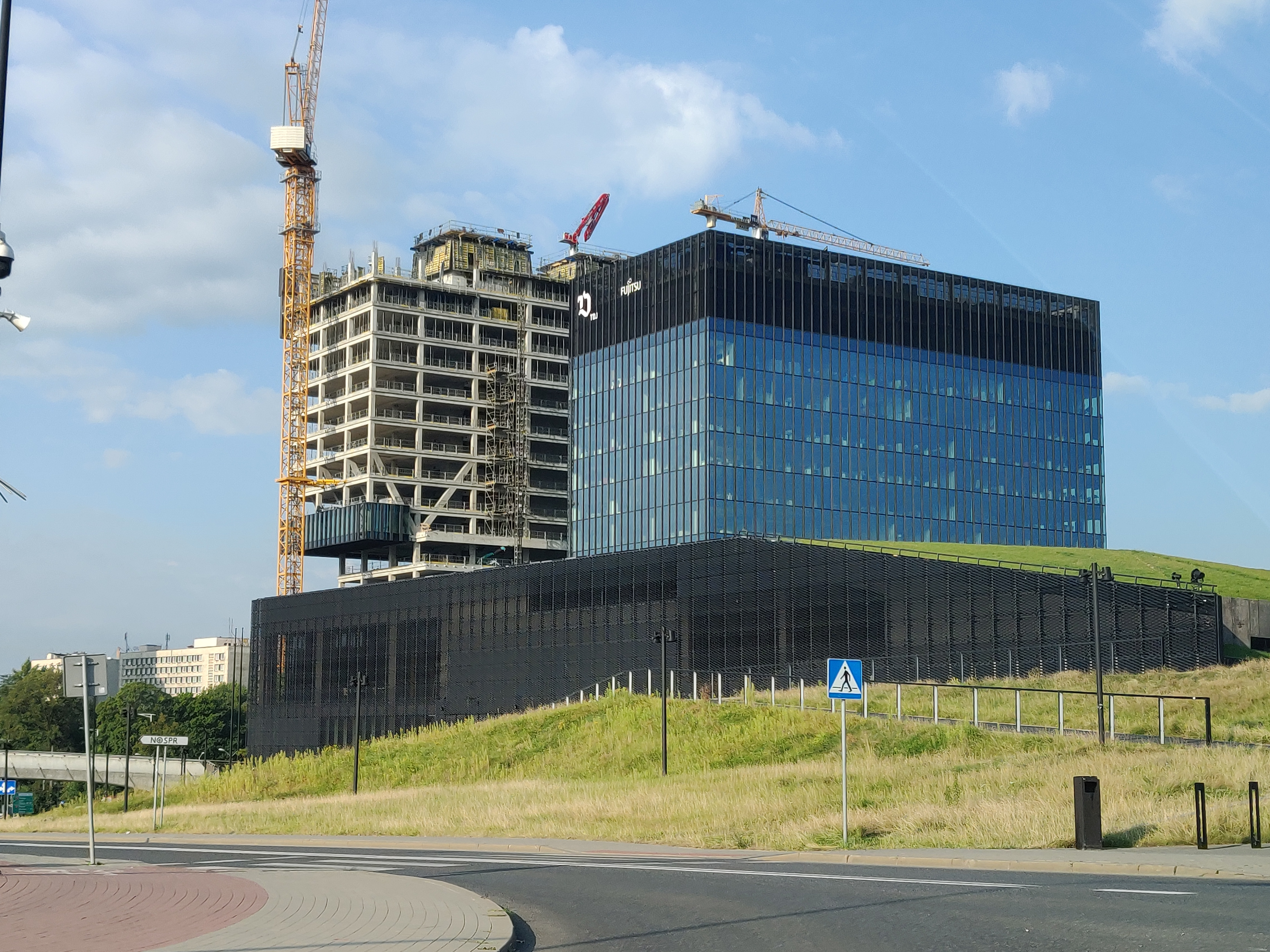
Construction of KTW II in August 2020

The Katowice City Development Strategy, adopted in 2005, identified priorities for sustained growth, including the creation of metropolitan-scale built environments and urban gateways. A 2006 architectural competition for a contemporary city center concept was won by Tomasz Konior, whose proposal involved narrowing the expanse of W. Korfanty Avenue through development on its western side. In March 2008, the Civil Aviation Authority approved an aeronautical study for Katowice, necessary for additional high-rise projects given the proximity of an airport located close to the city center in Muchowiec.

Between 2002 and 2003, the Altus Skyscraper building on Uniwersytecka Street was completed, then the tallest in southern Poland at 125 meters. Composed of three interconnected volumes joined by a four-story base atrium, it was designed primarily by Dieter Paleta and marked the first structure in the Silesian Voivodeship to surpass 120 meters. Subsequent projects included the Sokolska 30 Towers complex (completed 2021), the Face2Face Business Campus (phased completion around 2020), and the Craft office building near Silesia City Center (completed 2023). The taller tower of the KTW complex, at 134 meters, was commissioned in February 2022 and became the tallest building in Katowice at that time. Designed by Medusa Group, the KTW complex drew inspiration from De Rotterdam through its use of offset rectangular volumes.

In 2021, the Cieszyn-based company Atal initiated two high-rise residential complexes: Atal Sky+ and Atal Olimpijska.

== Bibliography ==
- Barciak, Antoni; Chojecka, Ewa; Fertacz, Sylwester, eds. (2012). Katowice. Środowisko, dzieje, kultura, język i społeczeństwo [Katowice. Environment, History, Culture, Language and Society] (in Polish). Vol. 2. Katowice: Museum of the History of Katowice. ISBN 978-83-87727-29-1.
- Borowik, Aneta (2019). Nowe Katowice. Forma i ideologia polskiej architektury powojennej na przykładzie Katowic (1945–1980) [New Katowice. Form and Ideology of Polish Post-War Architecture on the Example of Katowice (1945–1980)] (in Polish) (1st ed.). Warsaw: Neriton. ISBN 978-83-66018-17-4.
- Bulsa, Michał; Grzegorek, Grzegorz; Witaszczyk, Beata (2013). Domy i gmachy Katowic [Houses and Buildings of Katowice] (in Polish). Katowice: Prasa i Książka. ISBN 978-83-63780-00-5.
- Bulsa, Michał; Szmatloch, Barbara (2019). Katowice, których nie ma [Katowice That No Longer Exists] (in Polish). Łódź: Księży Młyn. ISBN 978-83-77295-02-1.
- Grzegorek, Grzegorz; Bulsa, Michał; Witaszczyk, Beata (2016). Domy i gmachy Katowic. Tom II [Houses and Buildings of Katowice. Volume II] (in Polish). Katowice: Prasa i Książka. ISBN 978-83-63780-16-6.
- Lewicka, Barbara (2017). Nekropolie: socjologiczne studium cmentarzy Katowic [Necropolises: Sociological Study of Katowice Cemeteries] (PDF) (in Polish). Katowice: University of Silesia Press. ISBN 978-83-8012-961-0.
- Łakomy, K. (2015). Wille miejskie Katowic [Urban Villas of Katowice] (in Polish) (2nd ed.). Katowice: Silesian Museum. ISBN 978-83-62593-65-1.
- Mrozek, W., ed. (1976). Katowice: ich dzieje i kultura na tle regionu [Katowice: Its History and Culture Against the Background of the Region] (in Polish). Warsaw: Arkady, Silesian Scientific Institute.
- Odorowski, W. (2013). Architektura Katowic w latach międzywojennych 1922–1939 [Architecture of Katowice in the Interwar Years 1922–1939] (in Polish) (2nd ed.). Katowice: Silesian Museum. ISBN 978-83-62593-44-6.
- Rzewiczok, Urszula (2006). Zarys dziejów Katowic 1299–1990 [Outline of the History of Katowice 1299–1990] (in Polish). Katowice: Museum of the History of Katowice. ISBN 978-83-87727-42-0.
- Studium uwarunkowań i kierunków zagospodarowania przestrzennego miasta Katowice – II edycja. Część 1. Uwarunkowania zagospodarowania przestrzennego [Study of Conditions and Directions of Spatial Development of the City of Katowice – 2nd Edition. Part 1. Conditions of Spatial Development] (PDF) (in Polish). City of Katowice. 2012.
- Studium uwarunkowań i kierunków zagospodarowania przestrzennego miasta Katowice – II edycja. Część 2. Kierunki zagospodarowania przestrzennego [Study of Conditions and Directions of Spatial Development of the City of Katowice – 2nd Edition. Part 2. Directions of Spatial Development] (PDF) (in Polish). City of Katowice. 2012.
- Szaraniec, Lech (1984). Architektura Katowic [Architecture of Katowice] (in Polish). Katowice: Municipal Office in Katowice. Museum of the History of Katowice.
