= Piotrowice (Katowice) =

Part of Katowice, Poland

- Part of Katowice
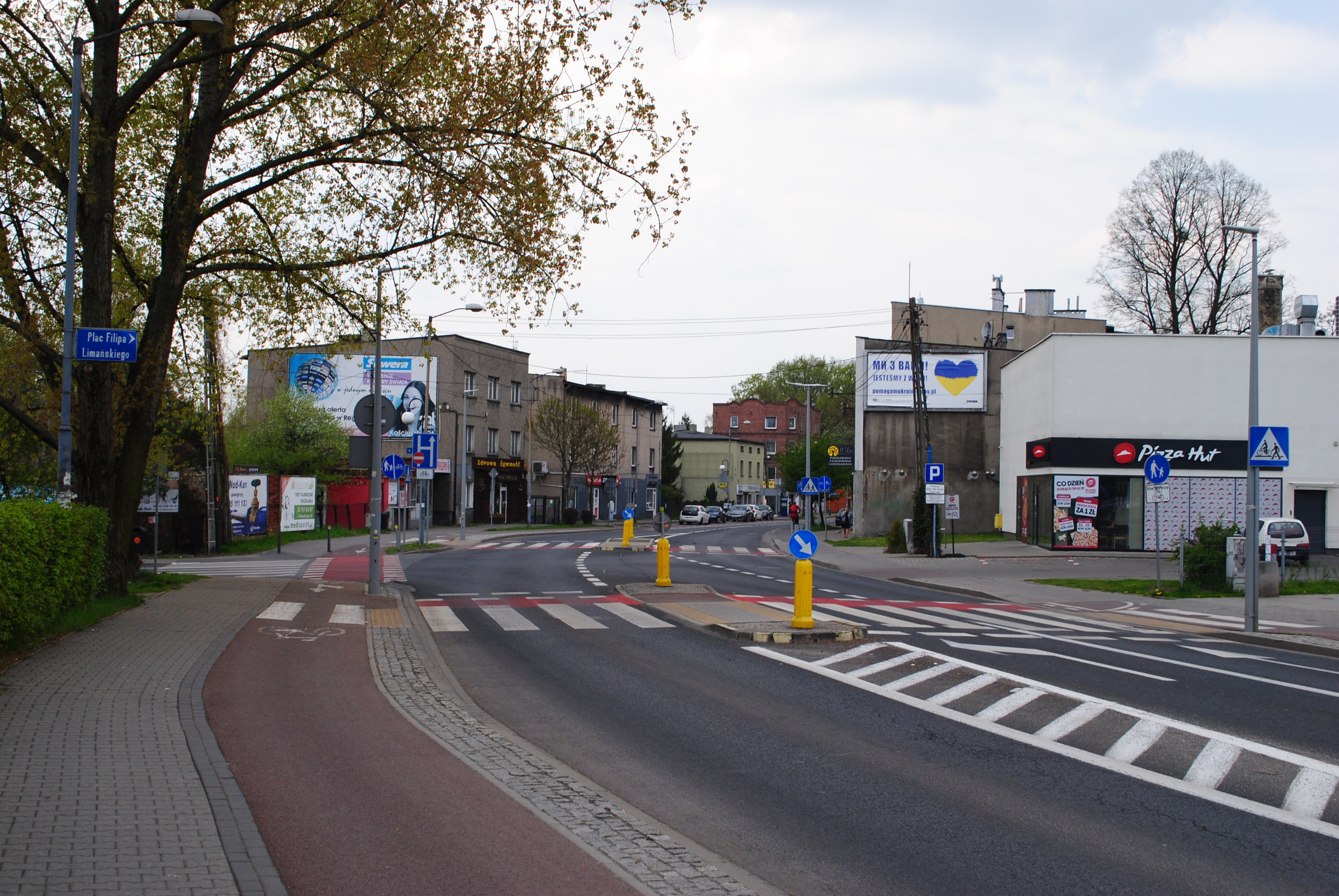
- Zygmunt Walter-Janke Street in Piotrowice

- Coat of arms
- Interactive map of Piotrowice
- Coordinates (Piotrowice): 50°12′30″N 18°58′00″E
- Country: Poland
- Voivodeship: Silesian
- County/City: Katowice
- District: Piotrowice-Ochojec
- Established: mid-15th century
- Area code: (+48) 032
- Vehicle registration: SK

Piotrowice (German: Petrowitz, Czech: Petrovice) is a part of Katowice, located in the southwestern part of the city, in the Piotrowice-Ochojec district.

It is one of the oldest settlements within the modern boundaries of Katowice, with its history dating back to the historic settlement of Uniczowy. The first mention of the village of Piotrowice appears in a document from the mid-15th century. Until the early 20th century, Piotrowice was a typical agricultural settlement, where mills were also operating, including several on the Ślepotka river. Over time, the village transformed into an industrial settlement, and the population grew, along with the development of educational and cultural activities. In 1907, a factory for mining machinery – later known as Famur – was established in Piotrowice. In April 1951, Piotrowice were incorporated into Katowice, and during the times of the Polish People's Republic, new residential estates were built in the district: Targowisko and Odrodzenia.

The main thoroughfares of Piotrowice are: Tadeusza Kościuszko Street (part of the national road 81), Armii Krajowej Street, and Zygmunt Walter-Janke Street. Additionally, the northern part of the settlement is crossed by a railway line, where the Katowice Piotrowice train station is located – the station building itself is the seat of the Iron Theater. Piotrowice is home to various types of enterprises, and it also houses the Police School in Katowice and the Wojciech Korfanty University of Silesia.

== Geography ==
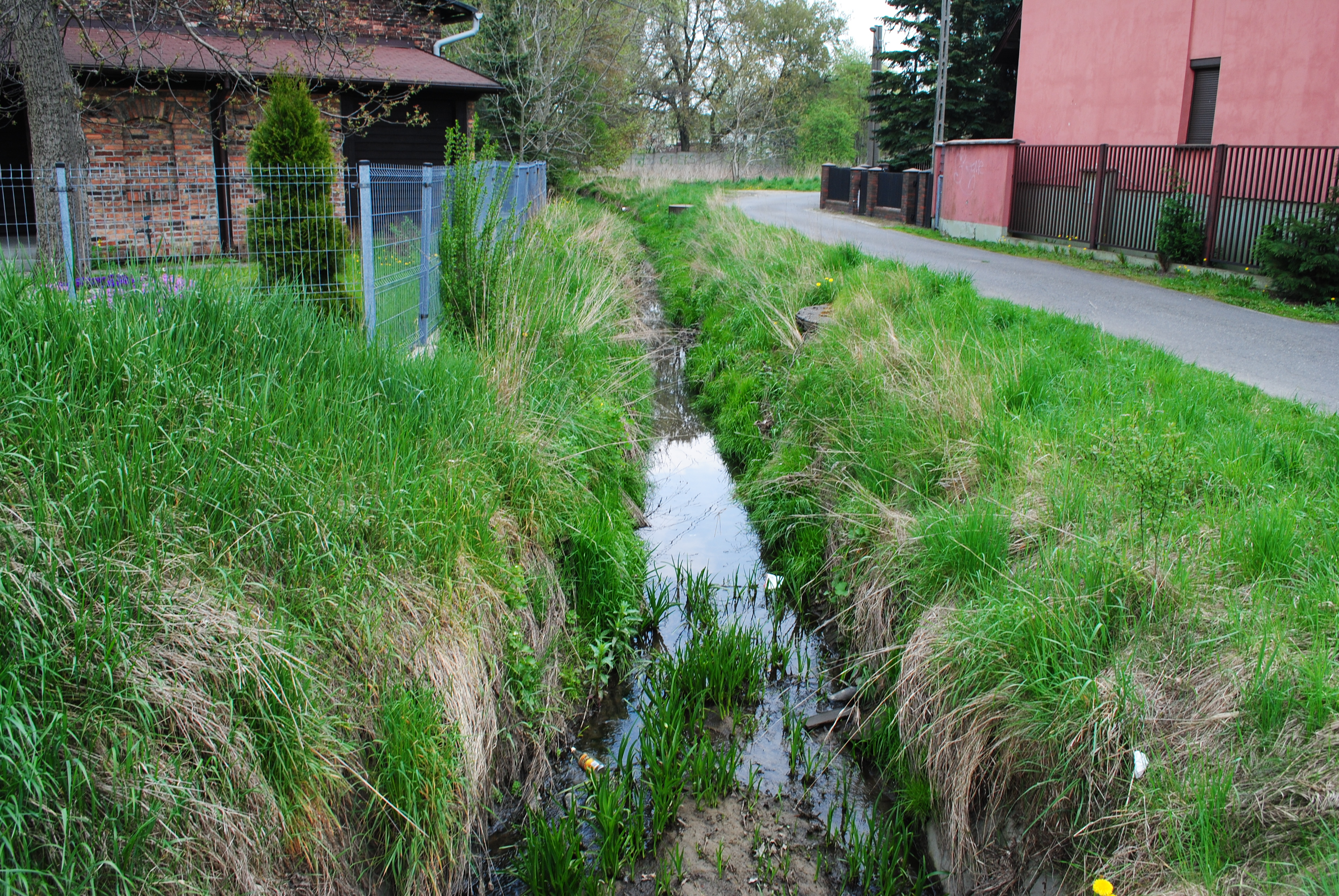
Mleczna river at the level of Wojska Polskiego Street

Piotrowice are located in the southwestern part of the city, within the Piotrowice-Ochojec district. They border Zadole and Ochojec to the north, Murcki to the east, Kostuchna to the south, and Zarzecze to the west. Geographically, Piotrowice lie in the mesoregion of the Katowice Upland (341.13), and historically, they are situated in the eastern part of Upper Silesia.

The historical gmina of Piotrowice extended beyond the village itself and included areas such as Zadole, Ochojec, and Kostuchna. Within Piotrowice, there were several settlements and neighborhoods, including Skały, Piasek, Kempa, Zadole, Skotnica, Targowisko, Gać, and Kąty, as well as colonies like Kostuchna and Ochojec. The northern border of the former gmina ran along the Ślepotka river, while the eastern boundary extended from the railway line towards Murcki. To the southeast, gmina encompassed the areas of Kostuchna, and its border with Podlesie ran along a stream flowing into the Mleczna river along today's Stabika Street. To the west, there are Kąty, bordering Zarzecze.

Geologically, Piotrowice are situated in the Upper Silesian Depression, filled with Carboniferous deposits (mainly conglomerates, sandstones, and clay shales containing black coal seams). The district is located in three morphogenetic units: the northern part lies within the Kłodnica Trough, which is a tectonic depression formed in Carboniferous rocks. The areas of Piotrowice along the Mleczna river valley are part of the Upper Mleczna Depression, while the eastern part of Piotrowice is situated on the Murcki Plateau, composed of Carboniferous formations.

The climate of Piotrowice is generally similar to that of Katowice as a whole, with local modifications (microclimate). It has a transitional temperate climate with oceanic currents prevailing over continental ones. The district lies within the drainage basin of two main river systems in Poland: the Vistula and the Oder, with a drainage divide of the first order running between them. The southern part of the district is part of the Vistula basin, drained by the Mleczna river, while the northern part flows into the Kłodnica river through the Ślepotka.

In terms of natural structure, greenery plays a significant role in Piotrowice, with tree plantations along streets, courtyard greenery, cemeteries, squares, and parks. Ruderal communities have developed in urban habitats, covering the entire district. The southern areas also feature vegetation typical of agricultural land, while the eastern part includes mixed forests and forestry areas. There is a shortage of publicly accessible green spaces in Piotrowice for daily recreation, and there are no district-level parks. The only natural monument in Piotrowice is a common pear tree growing at 10c Artur Grottger Street.

To the east of Piotrowice lies the Ochojec nature reserve, established in 1982 to protect mountain plants with a relict range in the Upper Silesia region. It covers over 25 hectares of a vast forest complex in the Ślepotka valley.

== History ==
=== Until the 19th century ===
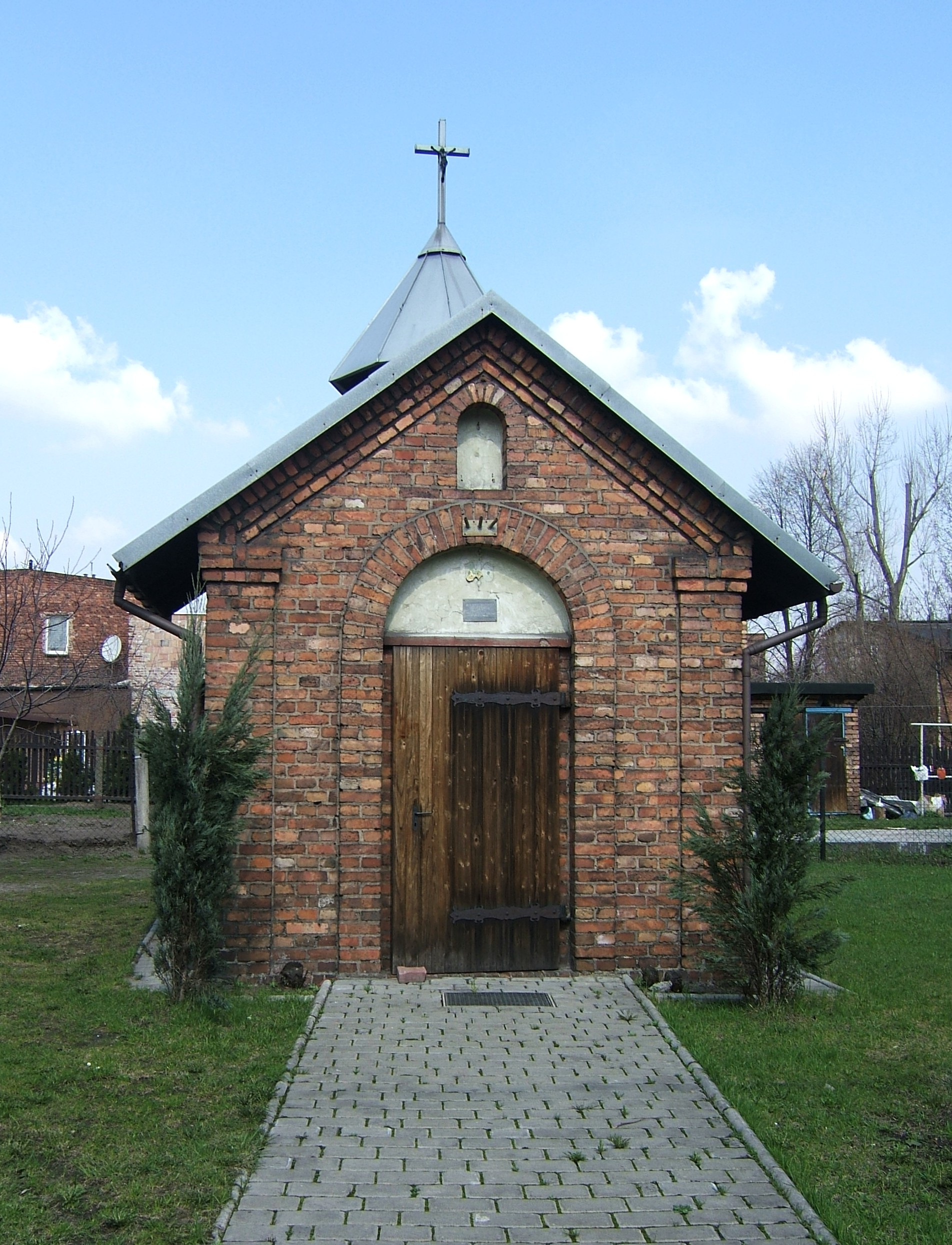
Chapel of 1922 at 3 Artur Grottger Street, built on the site of a former chapel built on the graves of fallen soldiers in the battle of 1644

The oldest traces of hamlets in the area of present-day Piotrowice date back to the Neolithic period (about 5,000 years ago). They were discovered between 1925 and 1938 in the northern outskirts, near the border with Ochojec, in the valley of the Ślepotka river. It was a hamlet of the pre-Lusatian culture, characterized by knowledge of fire and pottery; flint tools were also excavated.

The first historical mention in documents about the areas of modern Piotrowice dates back to 1287 and comes from a document issued in Rybnik by the Racibórz duke, Mieszko I. This document mentions, among other things, the forest called Popowe Kąty, located north of Głęboki Dół and east of the road to Zarzecze. This forest was situated in the area of Kąty Piotrowickie.

Piotrowice themselves are one of the oldest settlements within the boundaries of modern Katowice. Together with Podlesie and Zarzecze, they formed one village called Uniczowy. Over time, these villages became independent, initially being referred to together with the designation Uniczowy. However, the old name Uniczowy gradually fell into oblivion, surviving only in the name of one of Katowice's streets – Uniczowska Street.

The first mention of the estate village of Piotrowice dates back to the mid-15th century when the then Pszczyna duke, Janusz Raciborski, granted the free Schultheiß of Piotrowice (Petrowicz-Uniczowa) named Piotr Ostrzeżony the right to own a tavern, mill, fishponds, and land. The name Piotrowice presumably derives from the name of the Schultheiß, Piotr, who became a free Schultheiß and received the hereditary function of the Schultheiß. After Podlesie and Zarzecze became independent, the owners of Piotrowice were the Promnitz family, followed by successive owners of the Pszczyna land – the Anhalt-Köthen dukes and the Hochbergs.

In a document of sale of the Duchy of Pless issued by Casimir II in Czech language in Fryštát on 21 February 1517, the village was mentioned as Petrowicze Vnicziowy (or Petrowicze Unitzowy). In documents from the 16th century concerning Piotrowice, the term Uniczowy was no longer predominantly used. According to the Pszczyna urbarium from 1593, Piotrowice had 10 peasants, the Schultheiß Maciej, and 5 cottagers. There was also a mill belonging to the Schultheiß at that time. In 1629, there was a tavern in Piotrowice, and in the early 18th century, there were four such establishments.

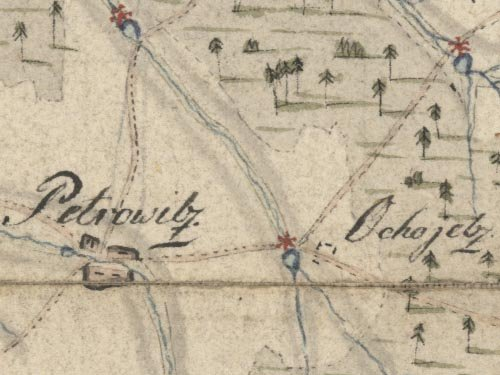
Piotrowice and Ochojec on a map from 1800

On 28 August 1644, during the Thirty Years' War, a battle between Swedish forces and combined forces gathered under an agreement between the Pszczyna duke Zygfryd II Promnitz and the Kraków bishop Piotr Gembicki took place in the vicinity of Piotrowice. These forces assembled near Tychy. One of the two squads under Żogoła's command moved towards Piotrowice, attacking the Swedish staff camp located in the village. These forces pushed the Swedes towards Mikołów. Still in the same year, a chapel was built on the graves of the fallen soldiers in the area of today's 3 Artur Grottger Street.

In the 17th century, the area of Piotrowice was much larger than it is today. From a preserved document issued on 22 July 1649 in Pszczyna, it can be inferred that Piotrowice bordered directly on Mysłowice, Załęże, and Kuźnica Bogucka. In the mid-17th century, the village had a farmstead in today's Ochojec and a colony – present-day Zadole. From the 17th century, there were three watermills in Piotrowice: two on the Ślepotka and one in the center of the village, on the Mleczna river, then called Dupina.

From the mid-18th century, the development of the village occurred due to the opening of a trade route leading from Mikołów to Mysłowice, which was used, among other things, for the transport of salt from Wieliczka. Piotrowice were a border village of the Pszczyna land, and at the border between Piotrowice and Ochojec, there was a customs checkpoint for road tariffs. In 1795, there was a mill on the Ślepotka in Piotrowice, owned by Jan (Jonek) Gruszka.

=== From the 19th century to World War II ===
In the 19th century, the village already had close to 800 inhabitants – in 1830, Piotrowice counted 751 residents. The first school was established in 1819 (or 1818), where Karol Miarka – a writer and national activist – taught from 1847 to 1850. Efforts to build a new school began in 1856. On 28 June 1885, a fire broke out, destroying the school and several neighboring houses.

In 1874, during the Prussian administrative reform, administrative districts were established, comprising several gminas and manorial areas – Amtsbezirk. An administrative district called Piotrowice (German: Amtsbezirk Petrowitz) was established, including the rural gminas of Ligota, Piotrowice and the Piotrowice manorial area. Apart from the village itself, the Piotrowice gmina also included Kostuchna, while the Piotrowice manorial area included, among others, the Ochojec hamlet.

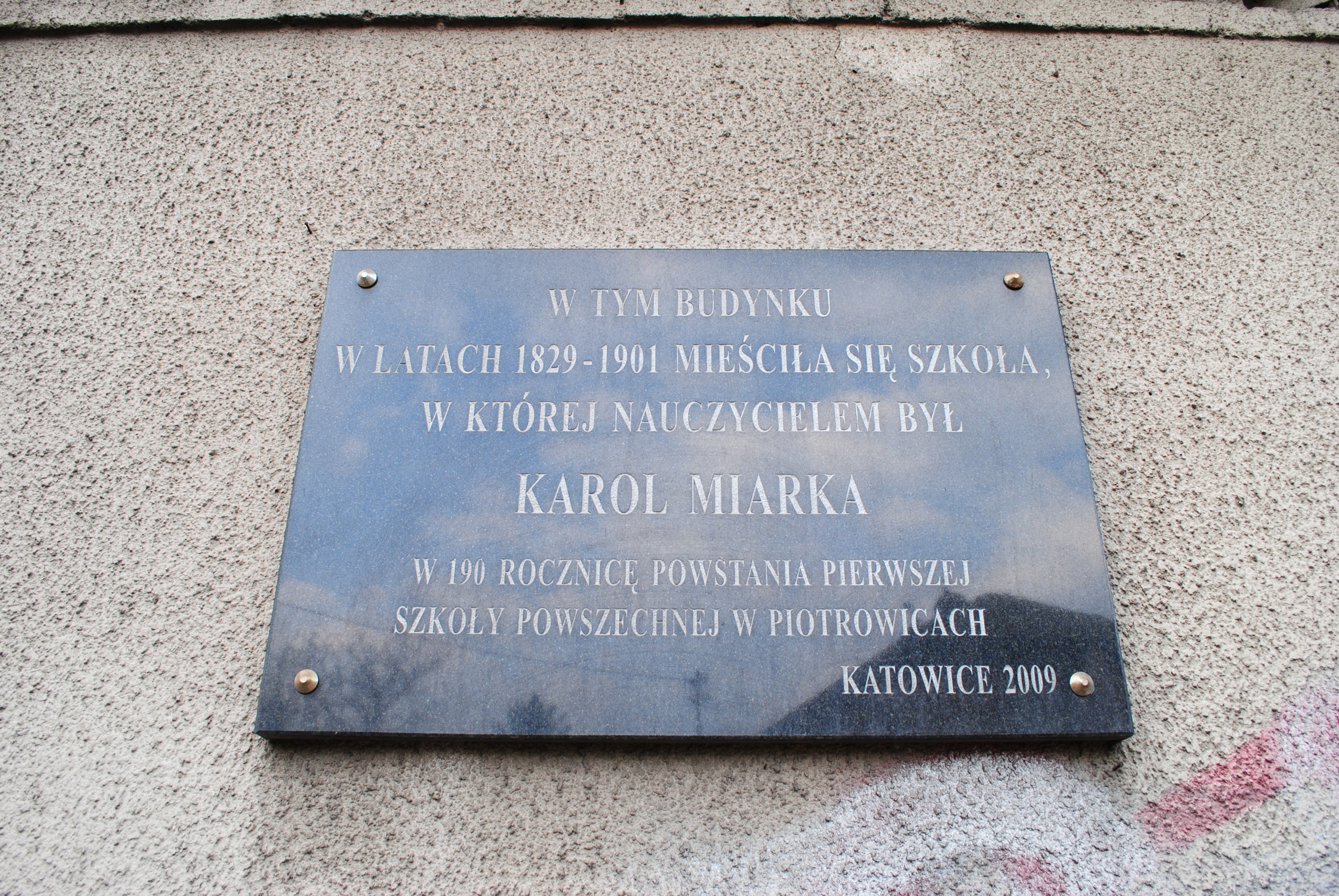
Plaque on the building at 104 Armii Krajowej Street, commemorating the location of the school where Karol Miarka taught

In 1879, a road connecting Mikołów with Katowice through Piotrowice was built. The Piotrowice section of this road is the present-day Zygmunt Walter-Janke Street.

At the beginning of the 20th century, Piotrowice began to change from an agricultural village to an industrial settlement. In 1910, it already had about 3,500 inhabitants, some of whom found employment in industry and mining. This gave rise to organized union, political, and cultural activities in the gmina. In the same year, a branch of the Polish Trade Union was established in Piotrowice, and a cell of the Polish Socialist Party, founded in 1908, was also active. Branches of the People's Libraries Society were organized. Already from 1912, the Jutrzenka Singing Society (established in 1911), the Peasant Council, and from 1920, the Union of Polish Women's Societies and the Sokół movement operated here. The cultural center then became the park in Zadole, with an amphitheater. On the other hand, some German residents, especially teachers and officials, were involved in the German Eastern Marches Society, an organization whose programmatic goal was to promote German culture.

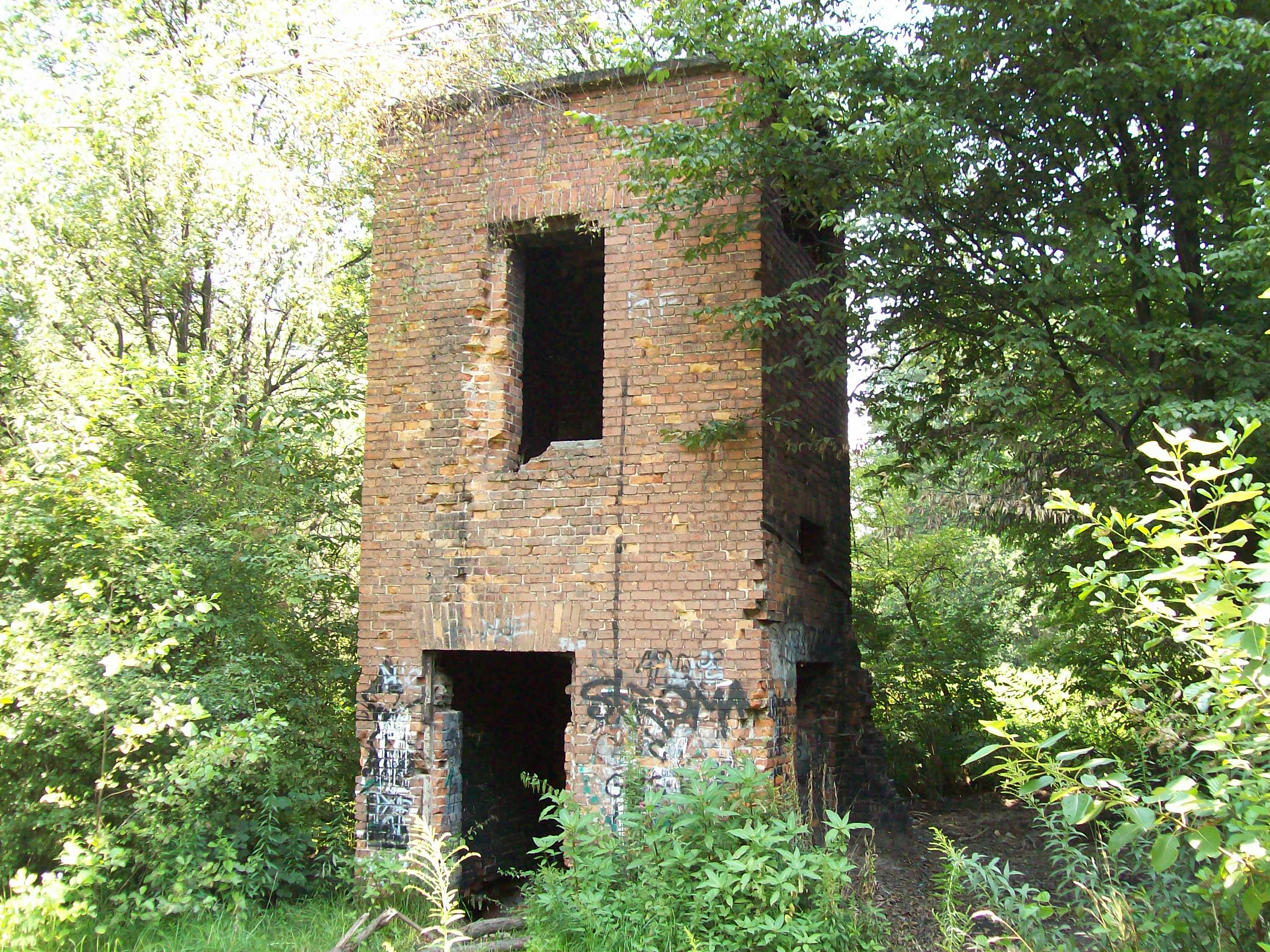
Ruins of the former mill on the Ślepotka river (2008)

On 19 February 1919, at the initiative of Piotr Gierlotka and Karol Stabik, a branch of the Polish Military Organization of Upper Silesia was established in Piotrowice and Kostuchna. The Piotrowice's Polish Military Organization group was transformed into an insurgent company of the 1st Pszczyna Regiment, 2nd Battalion, under the command of Leopold Kocma. In Piotrowice, on 18 June 1919, a meeting of the Polish Military Organization commanders of the Pszczyna County was held, demanding the start of the uprising in June 1919. A meeting was also organized in Piotrowice on August 12 of the same year. On 17 August 1919, the First Silesian Uprising broke out. In Piotrowice, a group of insurgents gathered to join forces with the Polish Military Organization group from Kostuchna. In the forests near Czułów, there was an exchange of fire between insurgents and Grenzschutz Ost units. The Second Silesian Uprising broke out on 19 August 1920. The day after, a group of insurgents from Piotrowice launched an attack in the forest on a 15-person unit of the German Sicherheitspolizei passing along the Mikołów road. In the 1921 Upper Silesia plebiscite, 89% of the inhabitants of the gmina and almost all the inhabitants of the manorial area (58 against 1 vote) voted for Upper Silesia's affiliation with Poland. The Third Silesian Uprising took place on the night of May 2 to 3, 1921. Piotr Gierlotka was the commander of the insurgents from Piotrowice, and Wilhelm Widuch was the commander of the company. This company was part of the 1st Battalion of the Pszczyna Regiment. The insurgents fought, among other places, in Strzebniów and under the St. Anne Mountain. After the uprisings, Piotrowice became part of Second Polish Republic, in the autonomous Silesian Voivodeship.

In the interwar period, the village underwent expansion. New houses were built, including along today's Armii Krajowej and Walter-Janke streets. As early as 1907, a factory for mining equipment and machinery (later known as Famur) was established here. In 1933, the Piast cinema started operating. In 1936, a Catholic parish under the patronage of the Sacred Heart of Jesus and St. John Bosco was established in Piotrowice. In 1938, part of the Piotrowice gmina was incorporated into Katowice, while the remaining part, on 1 April (or in March) 1939, by decision of the Silesian Parliament, changed its administrative affiliation from Pszczyna County to Katowice County.

=== World War II and the postwar period ===
During the German occupation of Poland, secret scouting operated in Piotrowice under the leadership of Karol Kornas, who was arrested by the Germans and executed in Berlin in 1942, and the Union of Armed Struggle, later the Home Army. Among those active in Piotrowice were the brothers Bolesław and Władysław Wiechuła, who currently lend their names to one of the streets. Near the railway station, in the Rail Rolling Stock Repair Workshops buildings, the occupiers organized a forced labor camp for prisoners of Polish, Russian, and Ukrainian nationality. A local Polish policeman was murdered by the Russians in the Katyn massacre in 1940.

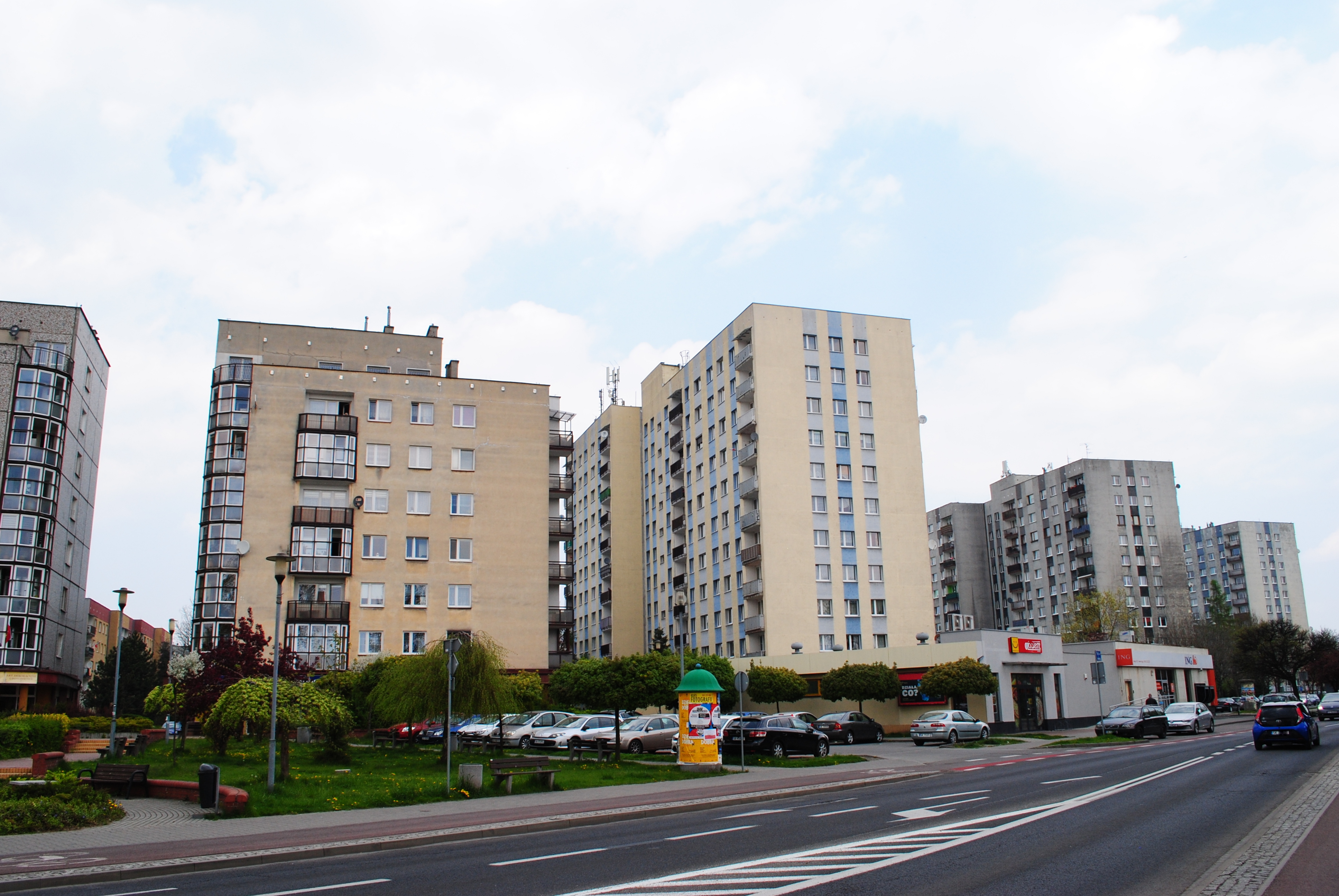
A fragment of the Targowisko housing estate from the late 1970s

After 1945, Piotrowice began to develop again. The first high school was opened: the Polygraphic School Complex, the Piotrowice Machinery Factory (later Famur) was expanding, and the population was increasing – right after World War II, it reached a level of 10,000 people in the entire gmina. On 1 April 1951, Katowice County was abolished, and at the same time, the gmina of Piotrowice was incorporated into Katowice. Despite this fact, the Civil Registry Office continued to operate in Piotrowice; marriages were performed, and death records were kept until 1974, when the Piotrowice Civil Registry Office was closed. However, Piotrowice have never been an administrative district. In the division established on 5 October 1954, Piotrowice were included in the Ligota administrative district. The division of Katowice into districts was abolished in 1973.

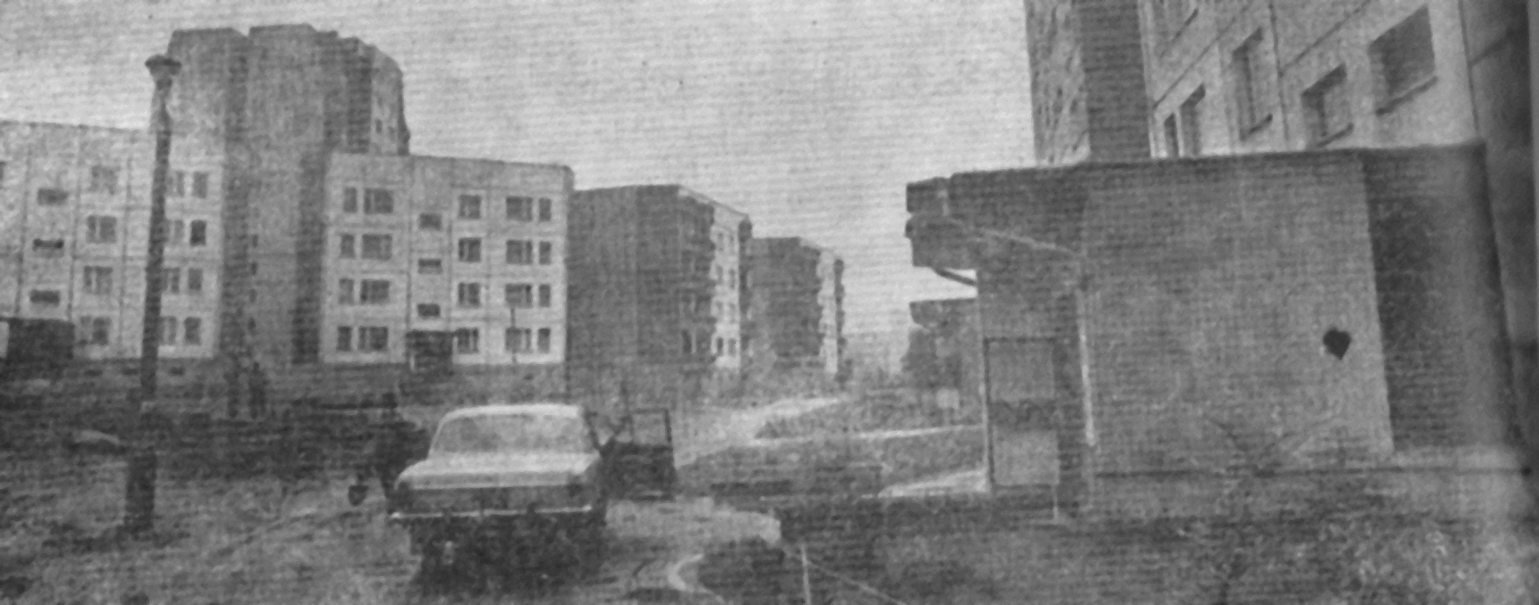
Odrodzenia housing estate around the 1980s

Due to the increase in the number of inhabitants, new residential blocks and estates were built. In the 1970s, residential blocks were built near Tadeusz Kościuszko Street, and in the 1980s, the Silesia housing cooperative was established in Piotrowice, under which the Targowisko housing estate was built in that decade, on the site of the former gmina market (between Szewska, Jastrzębia, Zbożowa, Targowa, and Janke streets) and the Żurawia housing estate (Żurawia and Sobocińskiego streets). On the border with Ochojec, on the site of former farmlands, a residential estate was built for 20,000 residents: the Odrodzenia housing estate. Meanwhile, individual construction was developing, and since the 1990s, also developer-led construction. The area between Aleksander Kostka-Napierski and Głuszców streets and along K. Kornas and Father Stanisław Wilczewski streets was developed for the construction of terraced houses.

On 16 September 1991, the City Council of Katowice adopted a resolution dividing Katowice into 22 auxiliary self-government units and 22 areas of their operation. At that time, local government unit No. 19 Ochojec – Piotrowice (later the Piotrowice-Ochojec district) was also established, including Piotrowice.

On 21 November 2001, the viaduct over Armii Krajowej Street was put into use, which now serves as a railway traffic route. In the 1980s and 1990s, barriers before the then-operating railway-road crossing in Piotrowice were down for 13–14 hours a day, and the waiting time for cars at the crossing reached 50 minutes or more. On 12 April 2021, with the participation of Prime Minister Mateusz Morawiecki and the Mayor of Katowice Marcin Krupa, a road junction at the intersection of T. Kościuszki and Armii Krajowej streets was opened. The modernization works began in 2018, and as part of this investment, a two-level intersection of streets was created, with the national road 81 passing below.

== Demographics ==
In 1840, there were 42 houses in Piotrowice, with 751 people living in them, while in 1871, the gmina counted 1,403 individuals, of which 1,073 were born in Piotrowice and 330 arrived from elsewhere. In terms of religious affiliation, Roman Catholics dominated the population with 1,382 individuals. Additionally, there were 9 Evangelicals and 12 Jews. In 1910, during the Prussian census, 3,659 people in Piotrowice spoke only Polish, 304 spoke German, and 3 spoke both languages. In 1934, the gmina of Piotrowice, which also included Ochojec, part of Kostuchna, Zadole, and Kąty, was home to 8,195 inhabitants, including 86 Evangelicals and 11 Jews. The gmina of Piotrowice had 8,066 residents in 1936. After World War II, there were about 7,500 people living in Piotrowice and around 10,000 in the entire gmina.

The chart below illustrates the demographic development of the village and later gmina of Piotrowice from 1629 to 1938:

Data sources: 1629; 1780; 1825; 1840 (according to another source, the same number of residents was recorded in 1830); 1861; 1871; 1885; 1891; 1900 (according to another source, there were 2,053 residents in 1900); 1905 (according to another source, there were 2,931 people in the municipality at that time); 1910 (according to another source, Piotrowice had 3,500 residents at that time); 1931; 1934; 1938.

== Economy ==
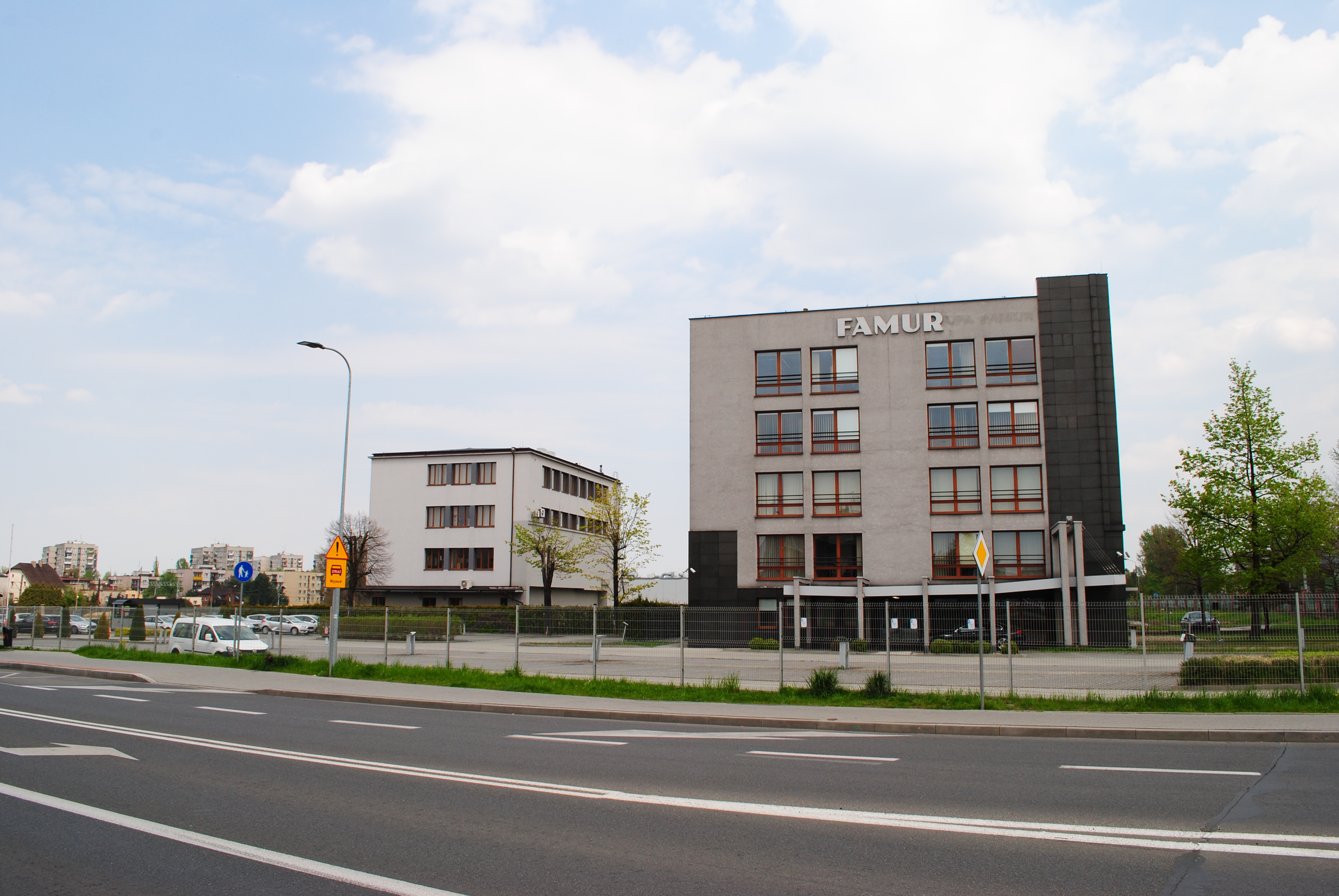
Famur company office buildings on Armii Krajowej Street

The beginnings of industry in Piotrowice date back to the 20th century. In 1907, a factory producing mining machinery was established here, which later became one of the largest metalworking plants. From 1930, this factory was named the Piotrowice Machinery Factory. It employed about 80–250 workers. In 1966, the plant changed its name to Famur. The Piotrowice Machinery Factory Famur underwent further modernization in the 1960s and 1970s. In 1975, it produced 168 mining combines, 700 pumps, and 350 hydraulic engines. During this time, the plant was among the world's leading manufacturers of mining equipment.

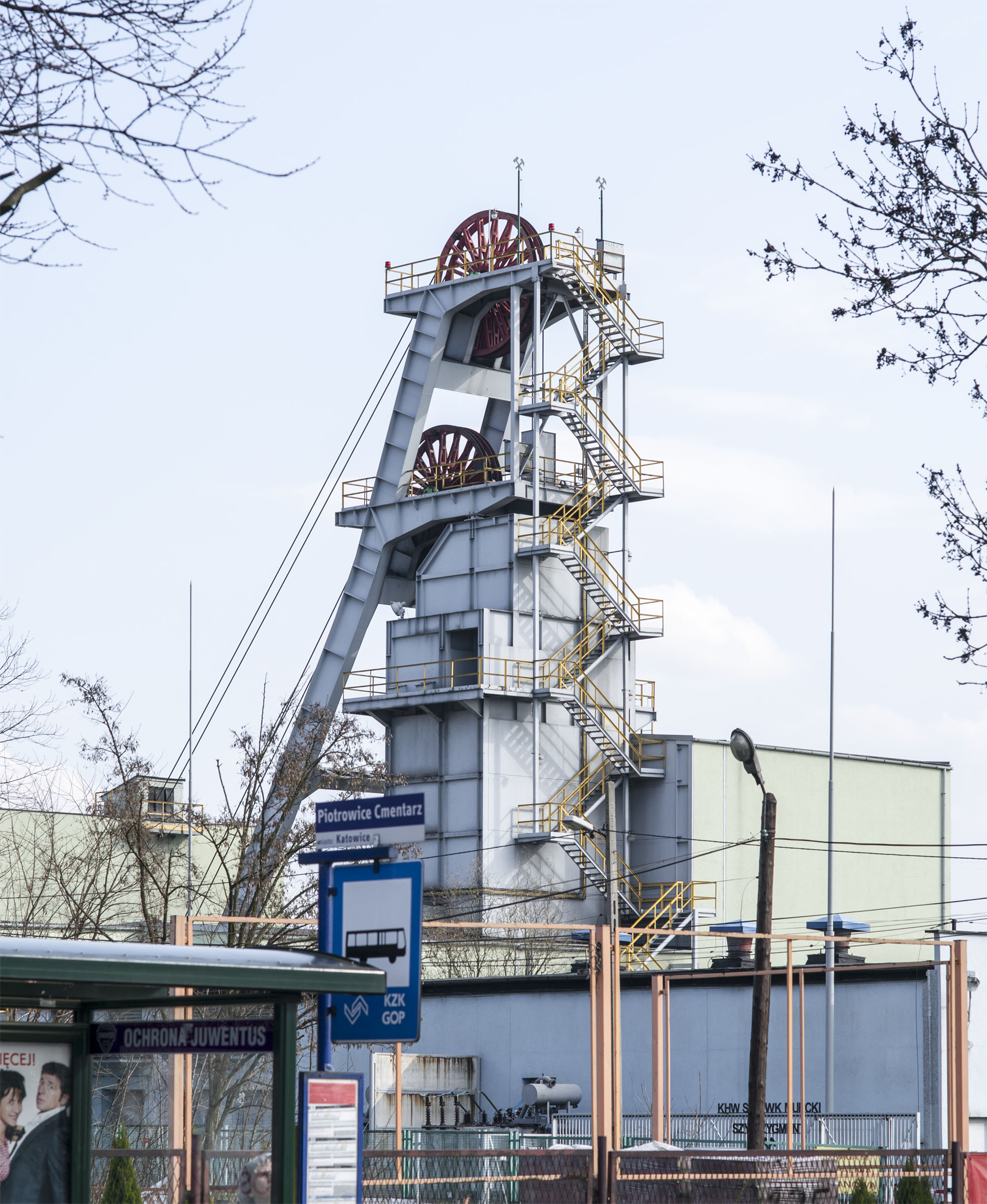
Zygmunt shaft of the former Murcki Coal Mine

With the establishment of the gmina, craftsmanship also developed in Piotrowice. At the beginning of the 20th century, workshops for all basic crafts were operating here. There were several forges here even in the 19th century. Additionally, before World War I, various trades had their workshops here: carpenters, electricians, cobblers, bakers, tailors, butchers, and hairdressers. After World War I, the Boronowski family opened the Gloria photographic studio on Kasztanowa Street, and their sons became professional photographers. A photographic studio was also established at 167 Zygmunt Walter-Janke Street. From 1923, there was also a stonemason's workshop in Piotrowice run by Józef Mendecki, and after World War II by his son. During the interwar period, there was also a concrete plant here. Additionally, there were two breweries and mineral water bottling plants, as well as canned food production. In the early 1960s, a fruit and vegetable market was established in the area of the future Targowisko housing estate. It was a 24-hour wholesale market, operating until the construction of the new residential estate in its place.

Piotrowice is home to rich deposits of limestone underground, which led to the development of quarrying for these aggregates in the past. In topographic works from 1860, it was indicated that there were 26 large lime kilns operating in the Pszczyna County at that time, including in Piotrowice. In 1896, the Prince of Pszczyna issued a concession for limestone mining in Piotrowice. Lime kilns were built on both sides of the current Armii Krajowej Street, near the cemetery. The most burnt lime was sold in 1908 – 2538 m^{3}. The last lime kiln was dismantled in 1959.

In 1921, the Railway Rolling Stock Repair Workshops were established in Piotrowice at the site of the Elevator iron construction plant. The workshops carried out repairs of railway wagons. After World War II, these facilities were transformed into the Railway Traffic Control and Communication Works of the Polish State Railways.

In 1931, between Piotrowice and Kostuchna, in the birch forest near Skotnica, bootleg mines began to emerge. Coal was extracted from them from the Emanuel field, from the 318 seam with a thickness of 2.8 m, and the shafts were dug up to a depth of 18 m. Coal mining in these mines lasted until 1938. Near the Piotrowice cemetery, the Murcki Coal Mine began construction of the Zygmunt ventilation shaft in October 1983. This shaft was put into use on 28 February 1989.

Commercial and service facilities in Piotrowice nowadays concentrate around the intersection of the main streets within the transformed former village area – in this case, it's the intersection of Armii Krajowej and Walter-Janke streets.

== Transport ==
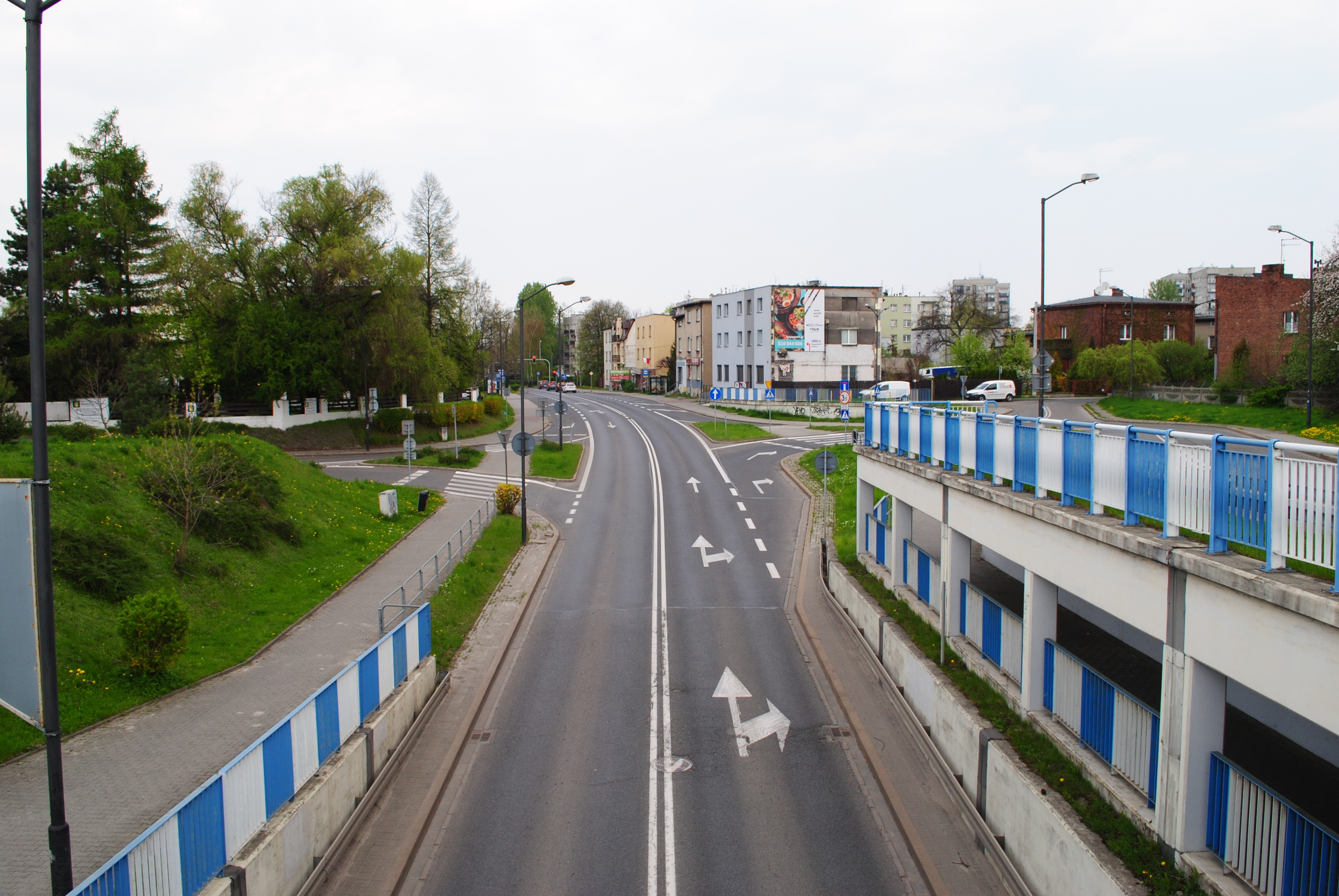
Armii Krajowej Street at the level of the Katowice Piotrowice train station (view towards the north)

The main transportation artery in Piotrowice is national road 81, along which Tadeusz Kościuszko Street runs through the district. This road serves as an exit southward towards Mikołów, Żory, and Skoczów. It also provides a direct connection between Piotrowice and Śródmieście. This road intersects with Armii Krajowej Street, which runs north–south. Armii Krajowej Street is a county road classified as a collector road (Z) and connects Piotrowice from the north with Ligota through Zadole, and to the south with Kostuchna and Podlesie. In the center of Piotrowice, Armii Krajowej Street intersects with another important road in the district: Zygmunt Walter-Janke Street. It connects the western part of Piotrowice – Kąty Piotrowickie with Ochojec and further with Brynów. This street is also a county road of class Z. Other important roads in Piotrowice include Aleksander Kostka-Napierski Street, Father Stanisław Wilczewski Street, and Wojska Polskiego Street.

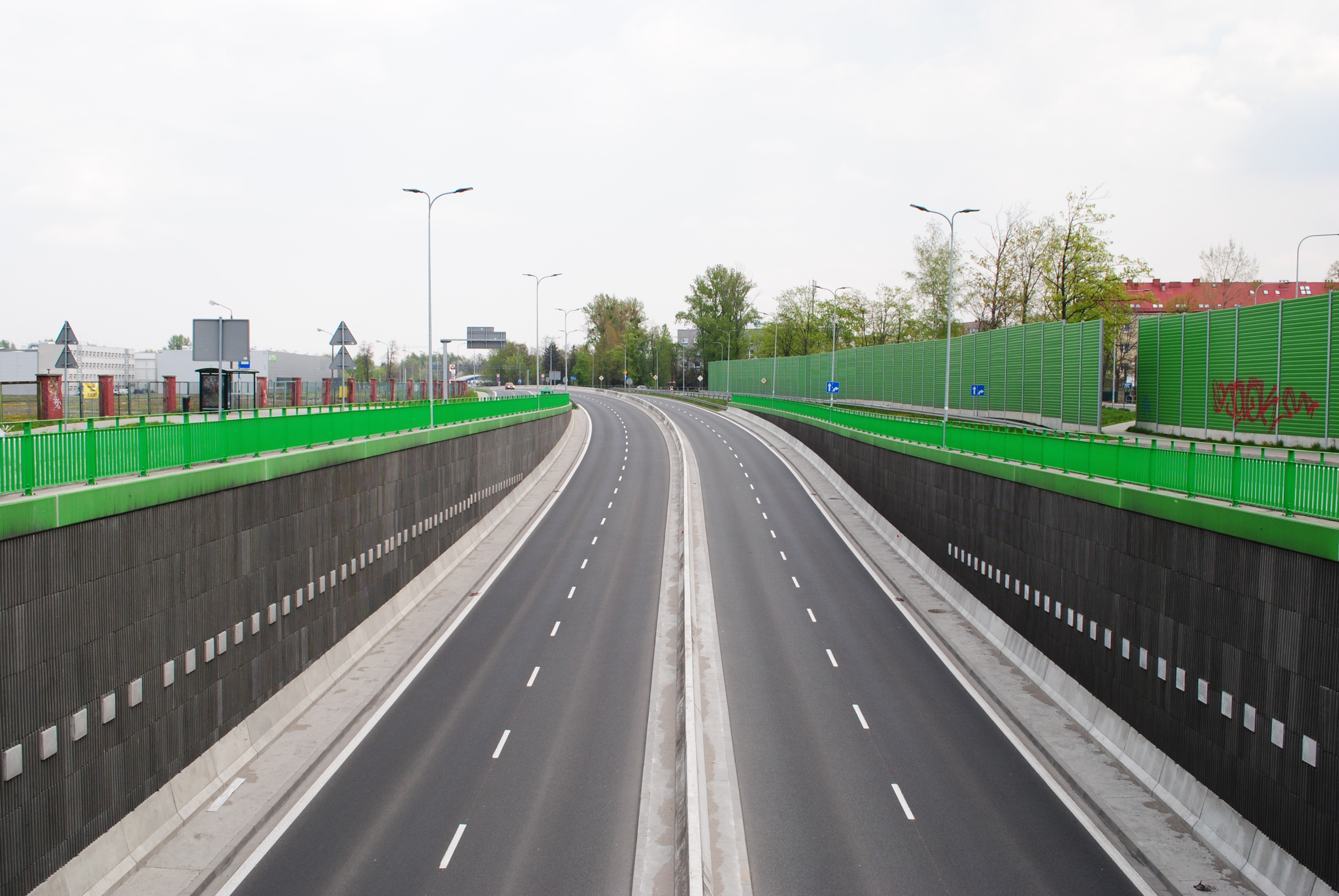
T. Kościuszko Street in Piotrowice (view towards Śródmieście)

In Piotrowice, there is a railway junction where railway lines from Katowice diverge in two directions: towards Bielsko-Biała and Rybnik, and further to Zebrzydowice and the state border. The lines passing through the Piotrowice area are: 139 Katowice – Zwardoń and 140 Katowice Ligota – Nędza. The first railway route in Piotrowice was opened on 20 January 1858. It was a section of railway that connected Mikołów with Ligota (now Katowice Ligota) over a distance of 9 km (or it was the opening of the line between Ligota and Orzesze on 30 April 1856). This route was built by the Wilhelm Railway Company. On the orders of the president of the Opole Region, this line was extended to Katowice. After connecting Katowice with Mikołów through Piotrowice, 22 trains ran daily.

In 1900, construction began on a line connecting Katowice to Tychy through Piotrowice. The first trains were launched in 1910 – due to unstable embankments built on former ponds, initially only light freight trains operated. Passenger trains started running in 1912 (the opening of the line between Ligota and Tychy took place on 2 November 1902), and only after World War I did trains to Tychy stop in Piotrowice as well.

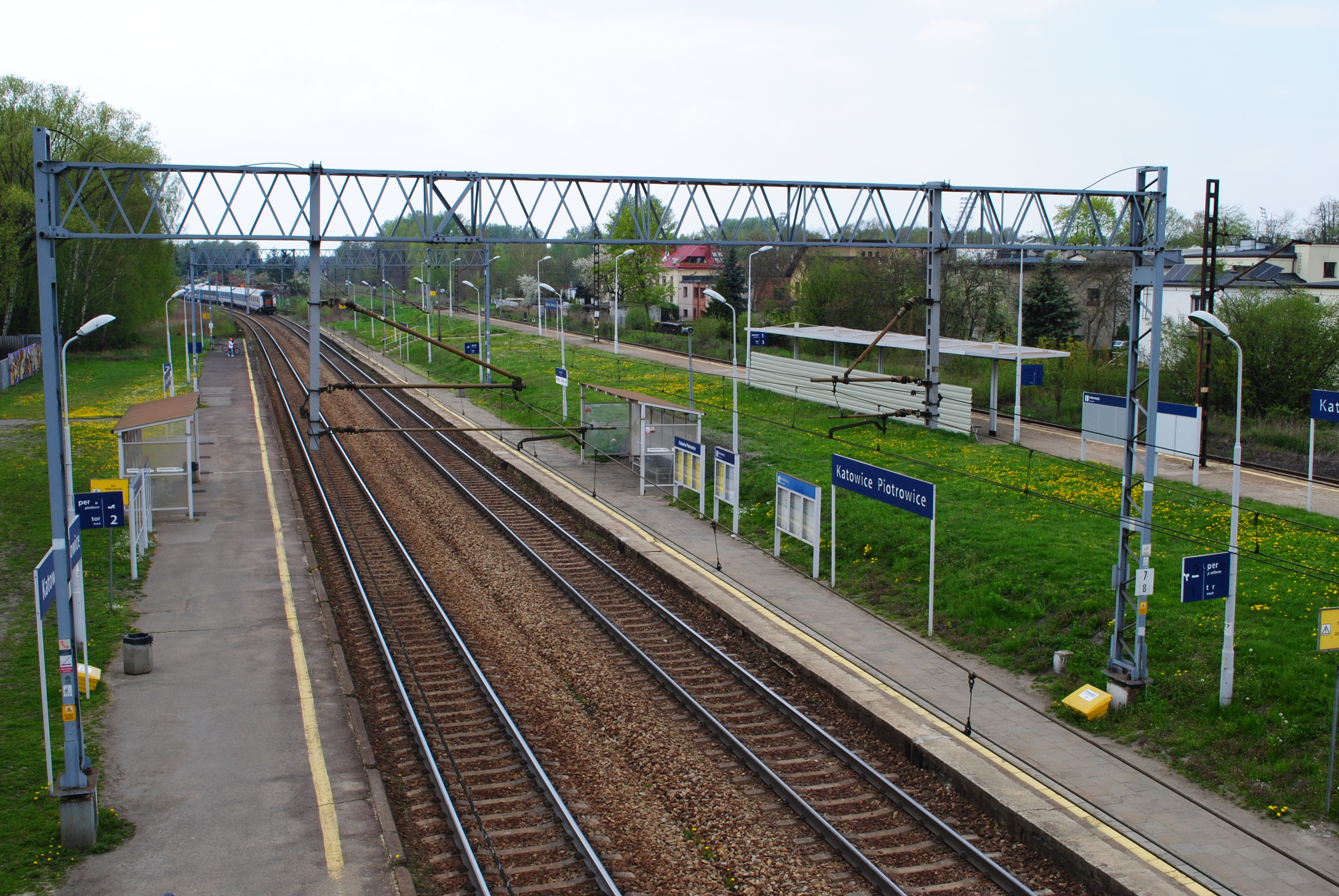
Katowice Piotrowice train station (view towards Tychy)

Katowice Piotrowice train station was opened in 1895. The platform was then located on the eastern side of the street towards Ligota, and a gatekeeper's building was erected at the platform, where tickets were also sold – over 3,000 tickets were sold in the first year. Construction of the railway station building at the Piotrowice stop began in 1912.

The peak of railway traffic through Piotrowice was at the end of the 1980s, and in the 1990s, this traffic decreased in favor of car transport. The level crossing with Armii Krajowej Street was a nuisance. In 1999, construction of viaducts under this street began. Car traffic under the new viaducts was opened on 21 November 2001.

The organizer of urban public transport in Piotrowice is the Metropolitan Transport Authority, and public transport within the settlement boundaries is provided solely by bus connections. The main carriers on routes passing through Piotrowice are: the Municipal Transport Company in Katowice and the Municipal Transport Company in Tychy.

There are a total of 13 stops in Piotrowice: Piotrowice Barcelońska, Piotrowice Bukszpanowa Kaplica, Piotrowice Cmentarz, Piotrowice Dworzec PKP, Piotrowice Działowa, Piotrowice Fabryka Maszyn, Piotrowice Miłe Zacisze, Piotrowice Osiedle, Piotrowice Pętla, Piotrowice Skrzyżowanie, Piotrowice Szkoła, Piotrowice Tyska, and Piotrowice Wojska Polskiego. At the four-stop Piotrowice Skrzyżowanie located in the center of Piotrowice, at the intersection of Armii Krajowej and Walter-Janke streets, according to the state from mid-May 2022, 9 bus lines, including one night line, stopped. These lines connect Piotrowice with other parts of Katowice, and some of them also with other cities in the Metropolis GZM: with Czeladź, Mikołów, Mysłowice, and Tychy.

== Architecture and urbanism ==
=== Urban development ===
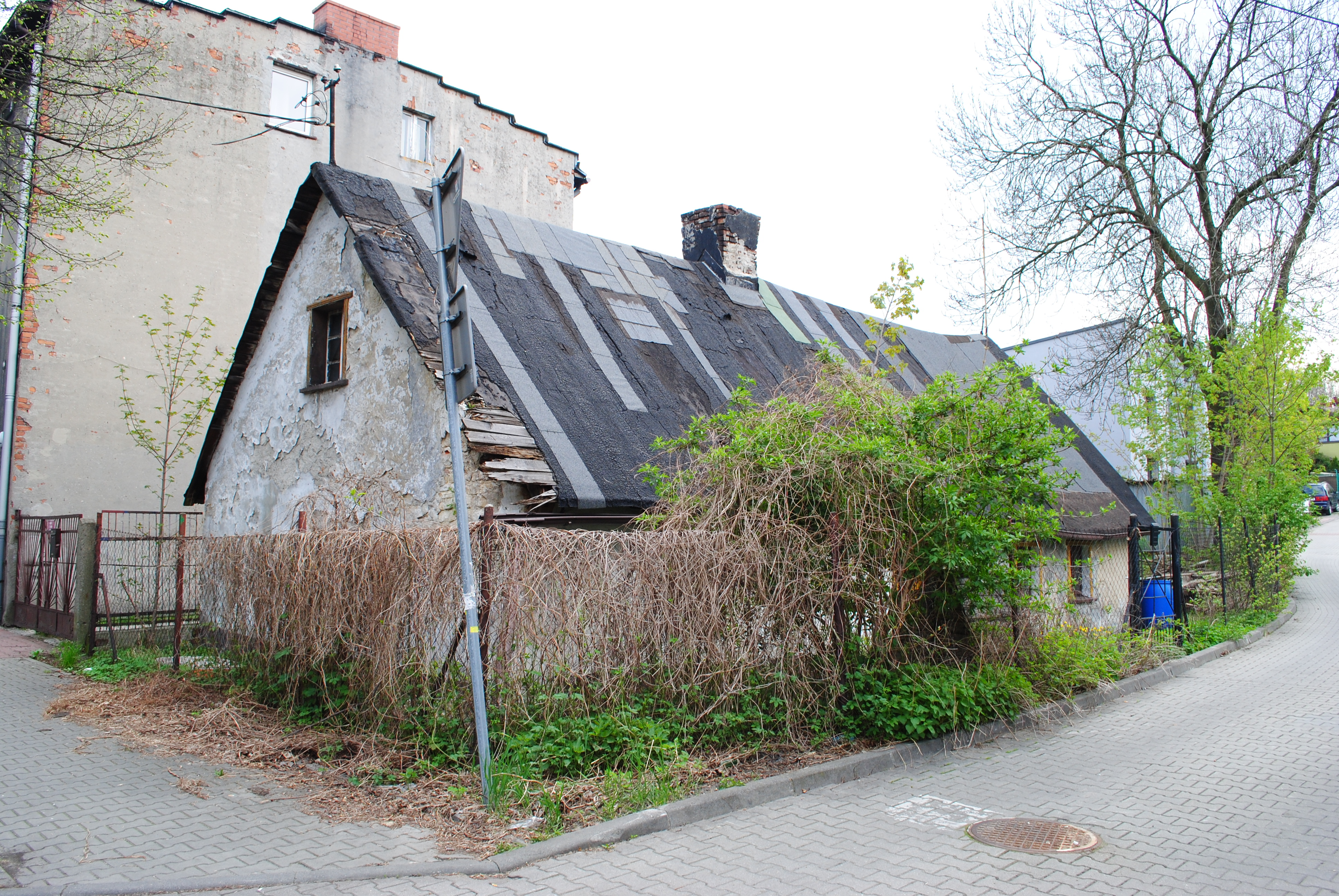
The oldest house in Piotrowice, located at 1 Załogowa Street

The earliest settlement in Piotrowice was located in the valley of the Mleczna river. The historical center of the settlement, where the first houses were located, is marked by Kasztanowa, Świerkowa, and Wojska Polskiego streets. These streets were part of the old trade route known as Furmańce. Traditional construction in the 18th and 19th centuries mainly consisted of wooden buildings with log construction and a two-room interior layout, with a foundation inscription and construction date placed above the lintel. Houses were also built of bricks and stone, covered with roof tiles. In 1830, there were a total of 42 houses in Piotrowice.

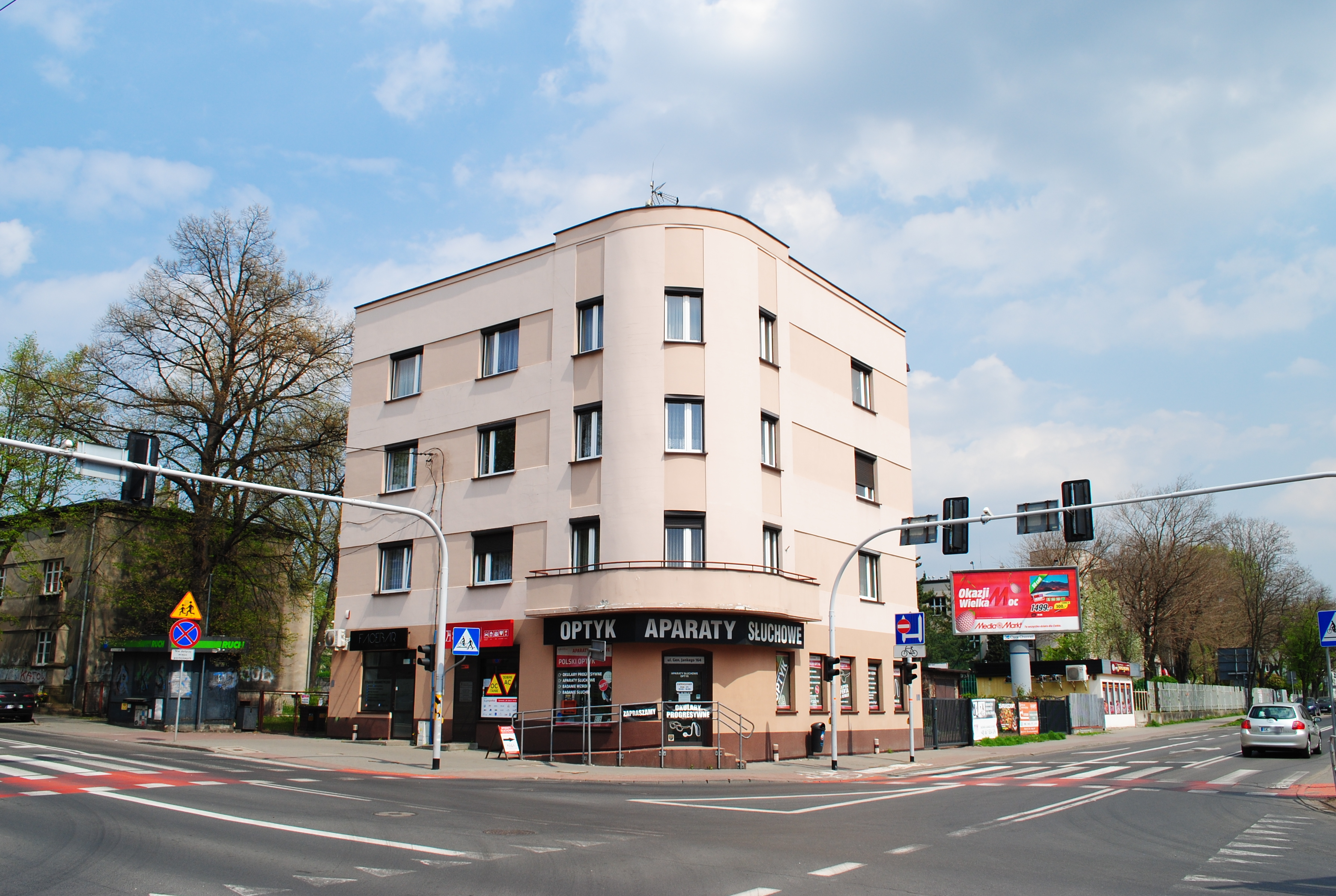
Building at 156 Walter-Janke Street

The oldest building in Piotrowice, dating back to the turn of the 19th and 20th centuries, is a village residential house located at 1 Załogowa Street. In addition, among the oldest buildings in Piotrowice, with a history dating back to the second half of the 19th century, are houses located on the following streets: 28 Artur Grottger, 15 Aleksander Kostka-Napierski, 183 and 216 Walter-Janke, and 48 Wojska Polskiego. In the early 20th century, Piotrowice began to transform from a village into a suburban settlement. With the increase in the number of village residents, multi-story, brick, and plastered houses began to be built. The development built between 1900 and 1922 is located in various parts of Piotrowice, mainly concentrated around the streets: Karol Darwin, Kasztanowa, Artur Grottger, Walter-Janke, and Wojska Polskiego. Significant urban development occurred in Piotrowice in the interwar period. New construction emerged along Armii Krajowej Street and Walter-Janke Street. After 1934, over 200 houses were built annually.

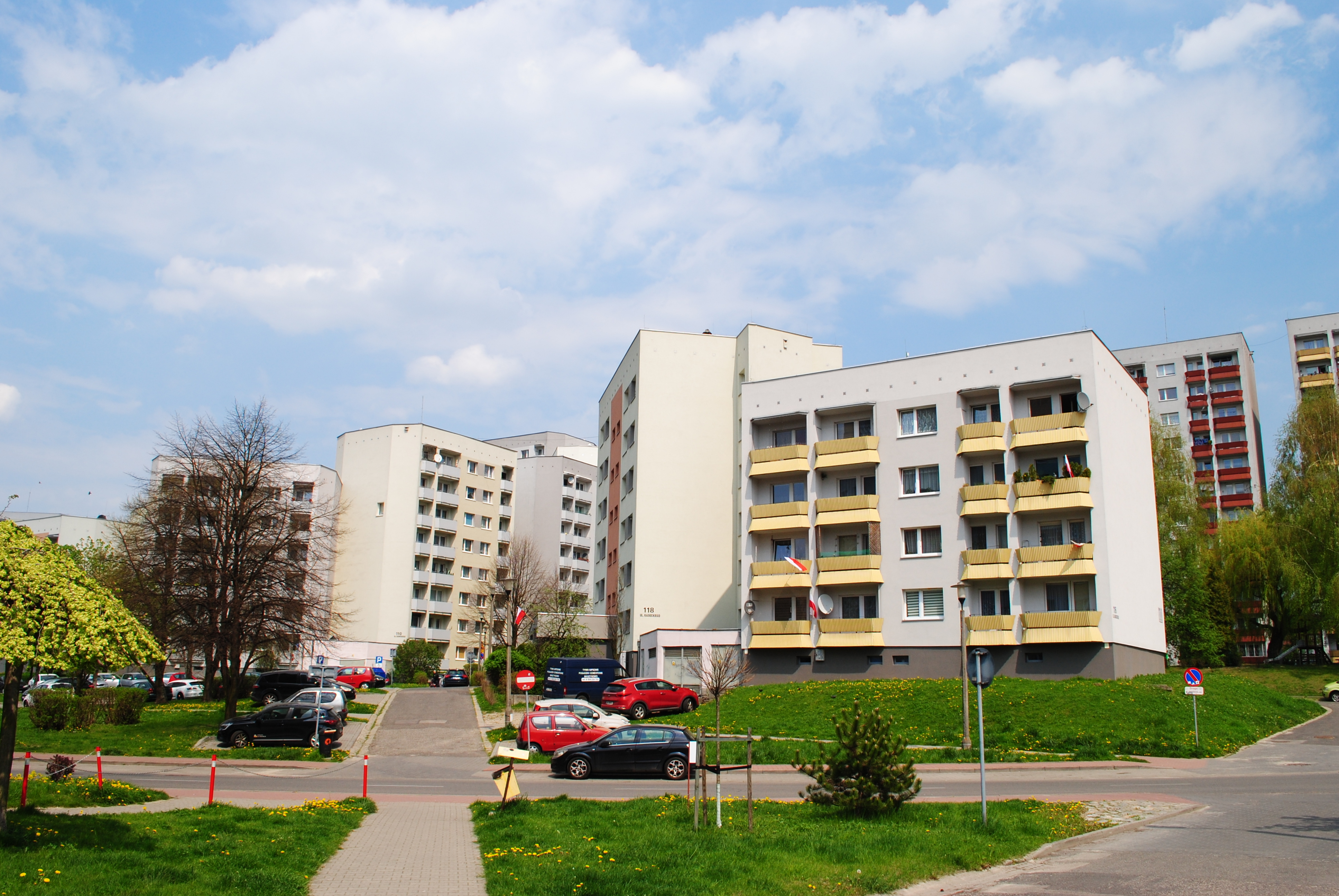
Part of Odrodzenia housing estate

During the Polish People's Republic, the first residential blocks in Piotrowice began to be built in the second half of the 1960s between T. Kościuszko Street and Żurawia Street. In the 1970s, the Department of Architecture, together with the Provincial Committee of the Polish United Workers' Party, prepared plans to demolish historic houses to build a modern center of Katowice. Due to local committee actions and the economic crisis in 1982, these plans were abandoned. Nevertheless, demolitions for new construction occurred – most notably in the Skotnica area and at the market square.

In March 1977, construction began on the Targowisko housing estate, located in the area of A. Fredro and Walter-Janke streets. It was designed by Zygmunt Fagas and was built until 1980. Individual and cooperative housing construction in the form of single-family houses also developed.

In the early 1980s, on the border between Piotrowice and Kostuchna, in the area of Tyska, S. Łętowski, A. Kostka-Napierski, and M. Radocki streets, construction began on the Odrodzenia housing estate, designed by a team of architects from Wrocław in cooperation with the Katowice Inwestprojekt. Construction work on the estate began in 1979. It was part of an architectural-urban design from the late 1970s, envisioning the construction of a large complex of residential estates for 120,000 people.

=== Monuments and memorial plaques ===
In Piotrowice, there were or are the following memorial sites:

- A chapel built in 1922 to commemorate the annexation of part of Upper Silesia to Poland, on the site of the graves of soldiers who died during the Thirty Years' War; inside the chapel, there is a plaque commemorating the residents of Piotrowice who died in the Second and Third Silesian Uprisings (at 3 A. Grottger Street);
- a plaque commemorating those who died during the Silesian Uprisings and World War II (at 64 Armii Krajowej Street; at the Polygraphic-Mechanical School Complex named after the Home Army);
- a former mass grave of German soldiers at the cemetery on Armii Krajowej Street – in 2007, exhumations were carried out to transfer the remains to the German soldiers' cemetery in Siemianowice Śląskie on Henryk Krupanek Street.

== Education ==
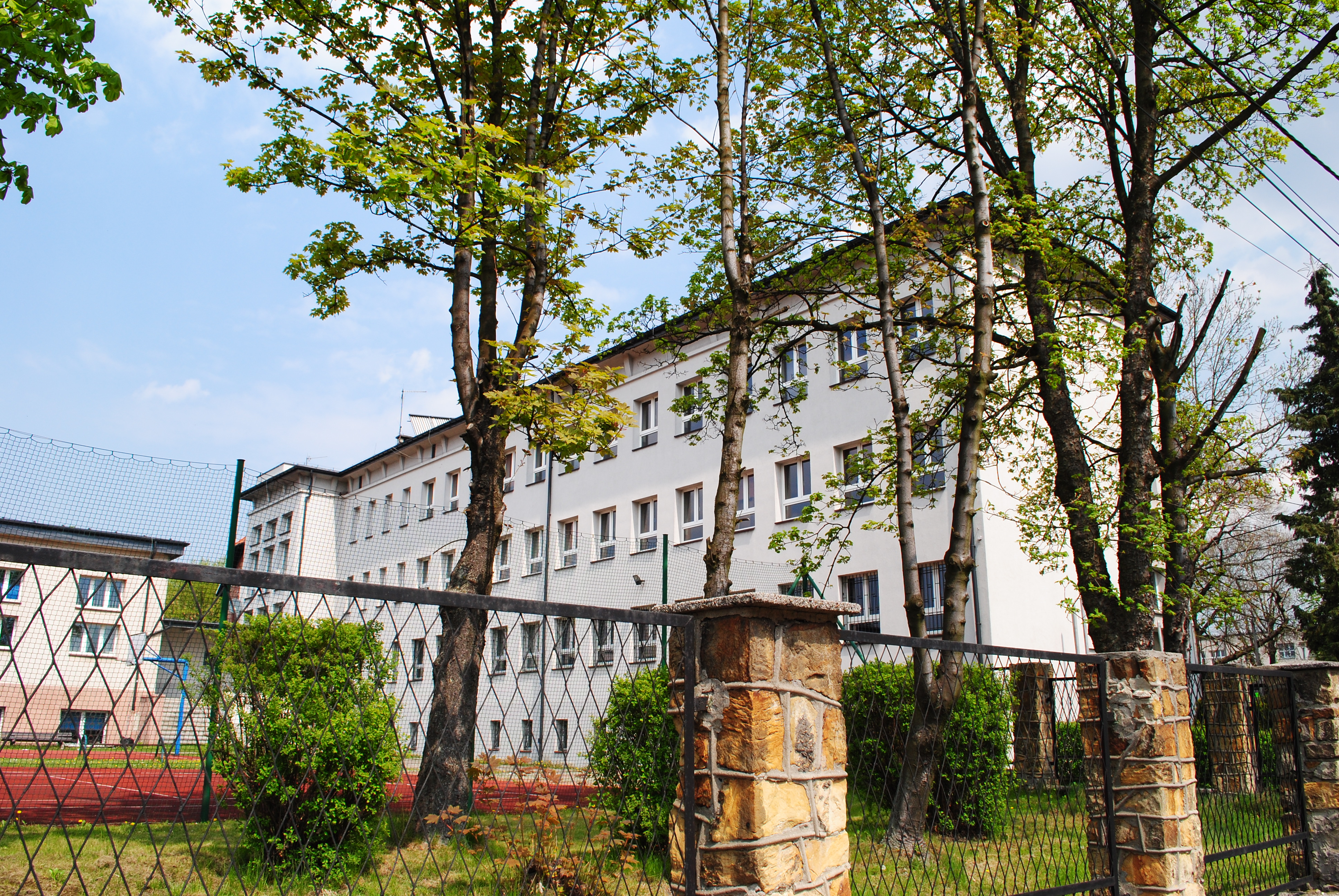
The building of the Polygraphic-Mechanical School Complex named after Home Army (84 Armii Krajowej Street)

The beginnings of education in Piotrowice date back to 1765 when the Prussian law on compulsory education came into effect. On 18 June 1810, school inspector Nygo from Mysłowice made the decision to establish a school in Piotrowice. At that time, children walked to school in Mikołów. On 19 February 1819 (or 1818), the first school building was opened in Piotrowice at the intersection of Wojska Polskiego and Armii Krajowej streets. The first teacher in the new institution was Antoni Hartmann. In 1865, a second floor and a teacher's apartment were added. On 1 July 1847, teacher Karol Miarka began working at the Piotrowice school, teaching until May 1850. Construction of a new school building in the market square area of Piotrowice, near Armii Krajowej Street, began in 1901. Teaching at the new facility commenced the following year, with four classrooms. In 1908, the school had 462 students, 15 of whom were of German descent.

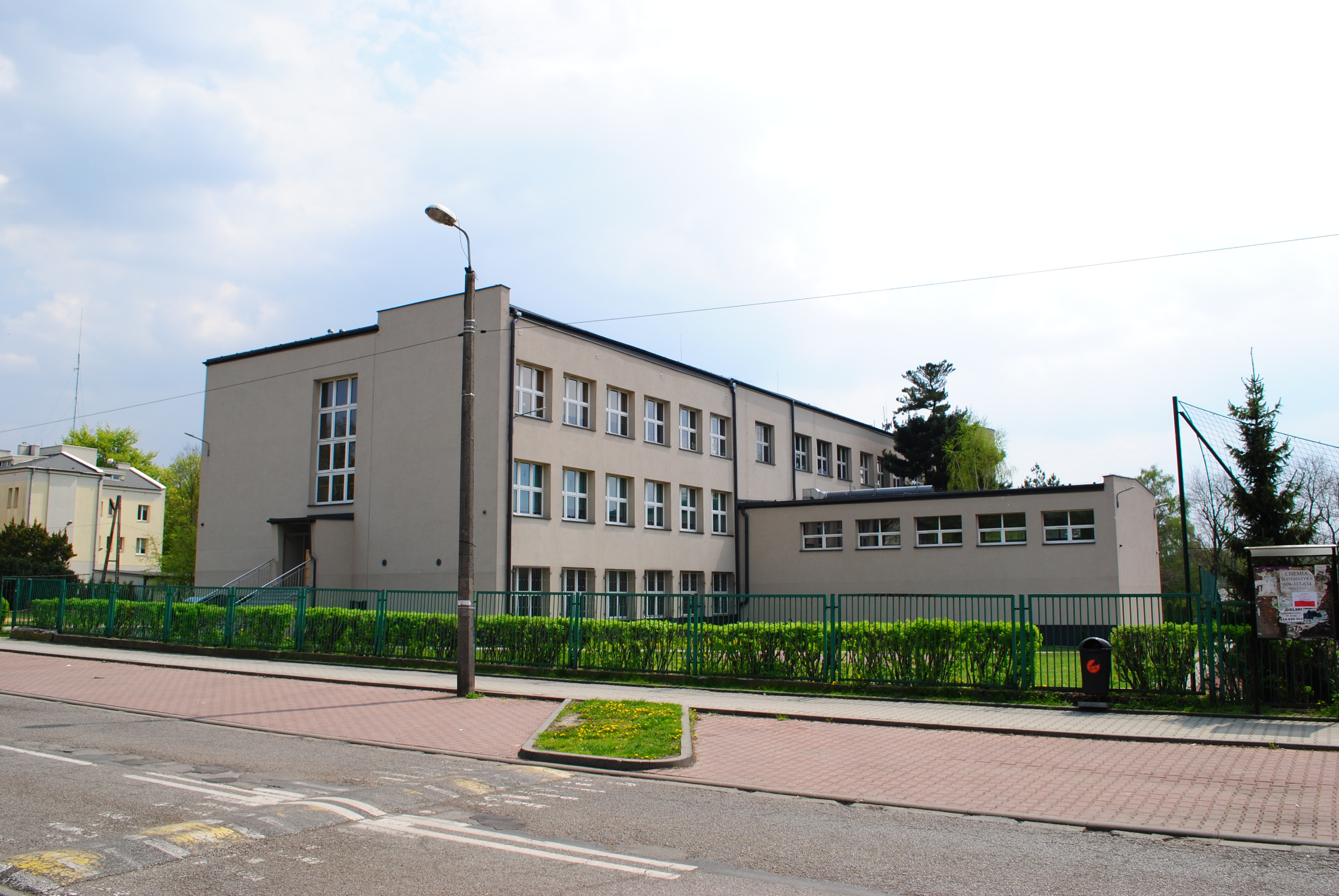
Building of the Karol Miarka Elementary School No. 28 in Katowice (160 Walter-Janke Street)

In 1929, construction began on a new public school building on the present-day Walter-Janke Street. Teaching started there on 7 December 1931, and in January 1936, the school was divided into two parts: Public School No. 1 for boys and Public School No. 2 for girls. School No. 1 had 507 male students, while School No. 2 had 428 female students. In the same year, the school building was expanded towards the north. The schools were merged in 1953, creating Primary School No. 28 in Katowice.

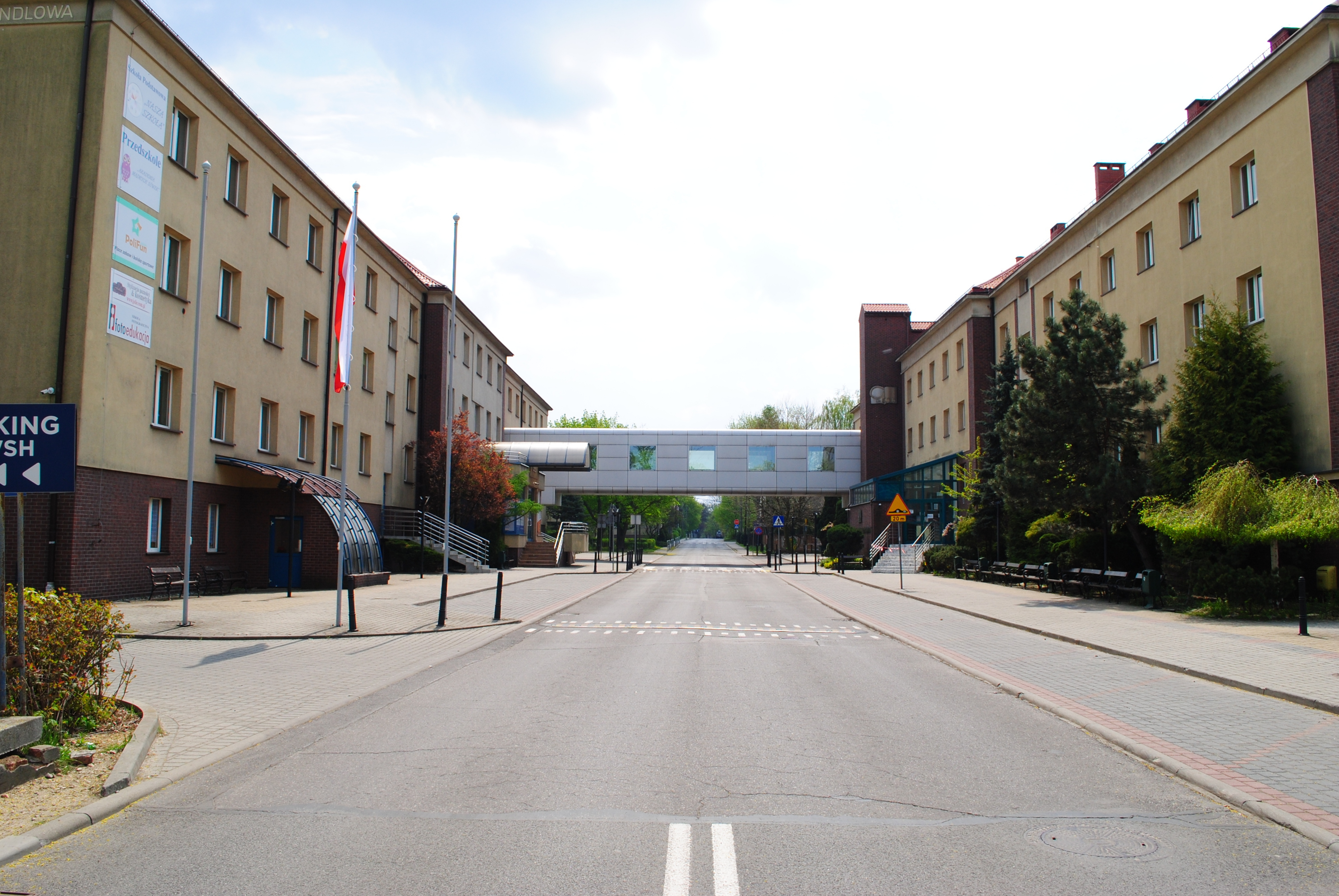
Development of the Wojciech Korfanty University of Silesia in Katowice

On Armii Krajowej Street, the Vocational School began in 1950, educating students in various professions. In 1978, this school evolved into the Polygraphic-Mechanical School Complex. On 1 September 1955, teaching commenced at the Technical School of the Central Cooperative Union, located at 2 Harcerzy Września 1939 Street. This school taught the professions of photographic technician and radio-television technician. In the 1990s, the school was renamed the Edward Abramowski Vocational School Complex.

In January 1960, as part of the Millennium of the Polish State celebrations, Primary School No. 32 was opened in Katowice at 86 M. Sobański Street.

In the 1960s, modern school facilities with a swimming pool and shooting range were built for the police school. In the 1970s, units of the Motorized Reserves of the Citizens' Militia were barracked in these facilities, followed by special police units. On 8 February 1999, the Police School in Katowice was inaugurated in the premises formerly occupied by Motorized Reserves of the Citizens' Militia and later by the police anti-terrorist unit, with Tadeusz Wojtuszko appointed as its first commander.

In the building of the former PFM-FAMUR workers' hotel, the Upper Silesian Private College of Economics was established on 1 October 1991, which transformed into the Upper Silesian School of Commerce in 1994, with Dr. Ewa Piastowska as its first rector. On 1 June 2022, the university changed its name to the Upper Silesian Academy named after Wojciech Korfanty in Katowice.

== Culture ==
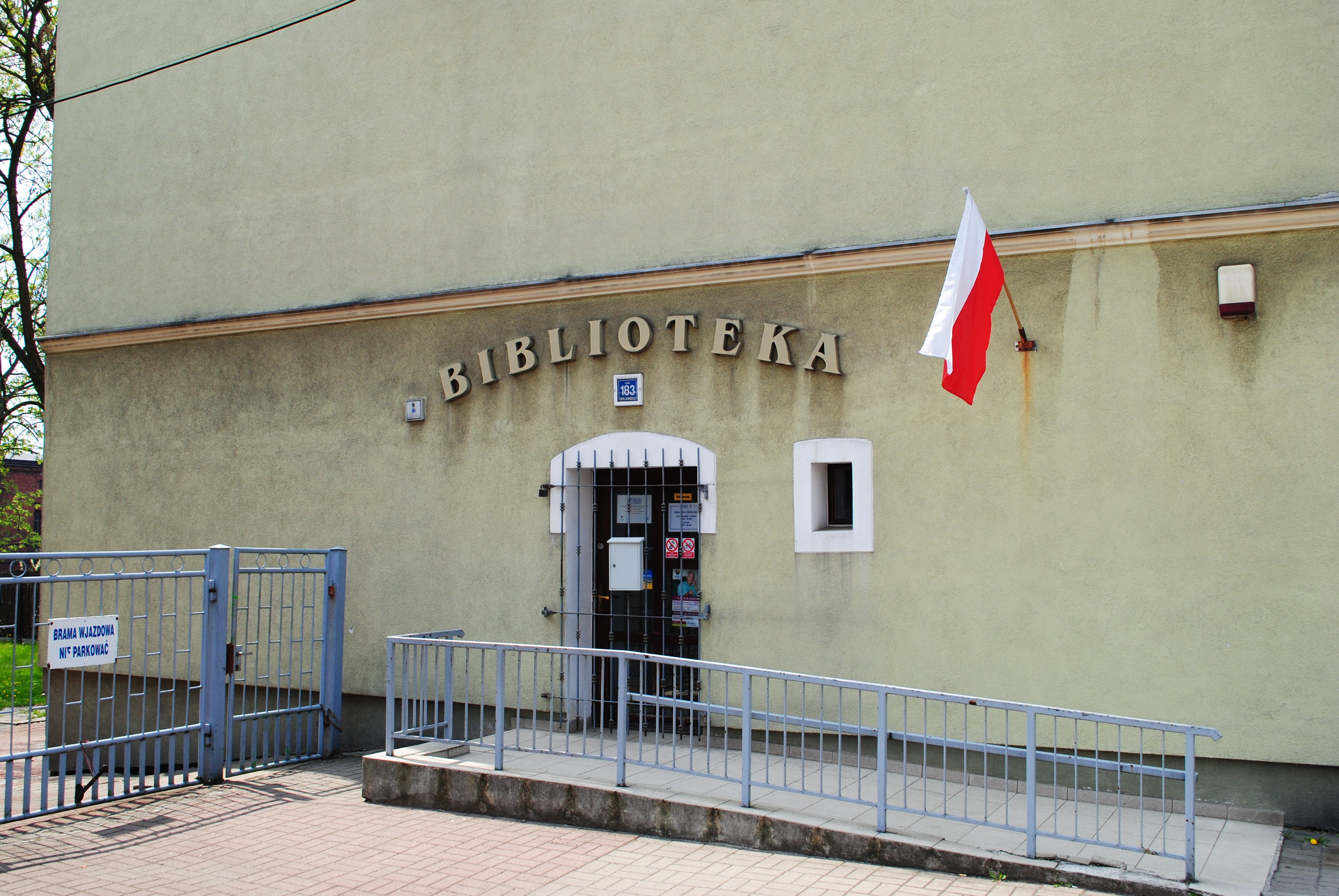
Branch of the Municipal Public Library in Katowice (183 Walter-Janke Street)

In Piotrowice, until the time of World War I, the customs of a Silesian village were preserved. Folk holidays such as Kupala Night and the drowning of Morana were celebrated here.

The first library of the People's Libraries Society in Piotrowice was established before the outbreak of World War I, with Ludwik Widuch, the founder of the Jutrzenka choir, being its organizer. During the interwar period, the library was located at the old school in the Piotrowice market square. After the Civil Registry Office was relocated to the Katowice Wedding Palace, the premises were taken over by the Municipal Public Library. The second branch of the Municipal Public Library in Piotrowice was established in 1984 in the Odrodzenia housing estate at 70a M. Radockiego Street.

In 1911, at the initiative of Ludwik Widuch, Piotr Gierlotka, Henryk Pieczka, and Paweł Łaskot, the Jutrzenka Singing Society was established. This group performed its first theatrical performance on 9 September 1912, in Kostuchna. Between 1912 and 1920, the society recited Polish poems and theatrical plays. During World War I, Jutrzenka suspended its activities, but in December 1918, the ensemble was reactivated. In 1935, the mixed choir Jutrzenka was reorganized, giving rise to the male choir Hejnał. At the beginning of the 21st century, Katowice was home to 13 choirs affiliated with the Polish Choirs and Orchestras Association, including the liturgical-children's-youth choir at the parish of the Sacred Heart of Jesus and St. John Bosco, and the chamber choir Fermata at the Piotrowice branch of the Municipal Cultural Center Południe in Katowice.

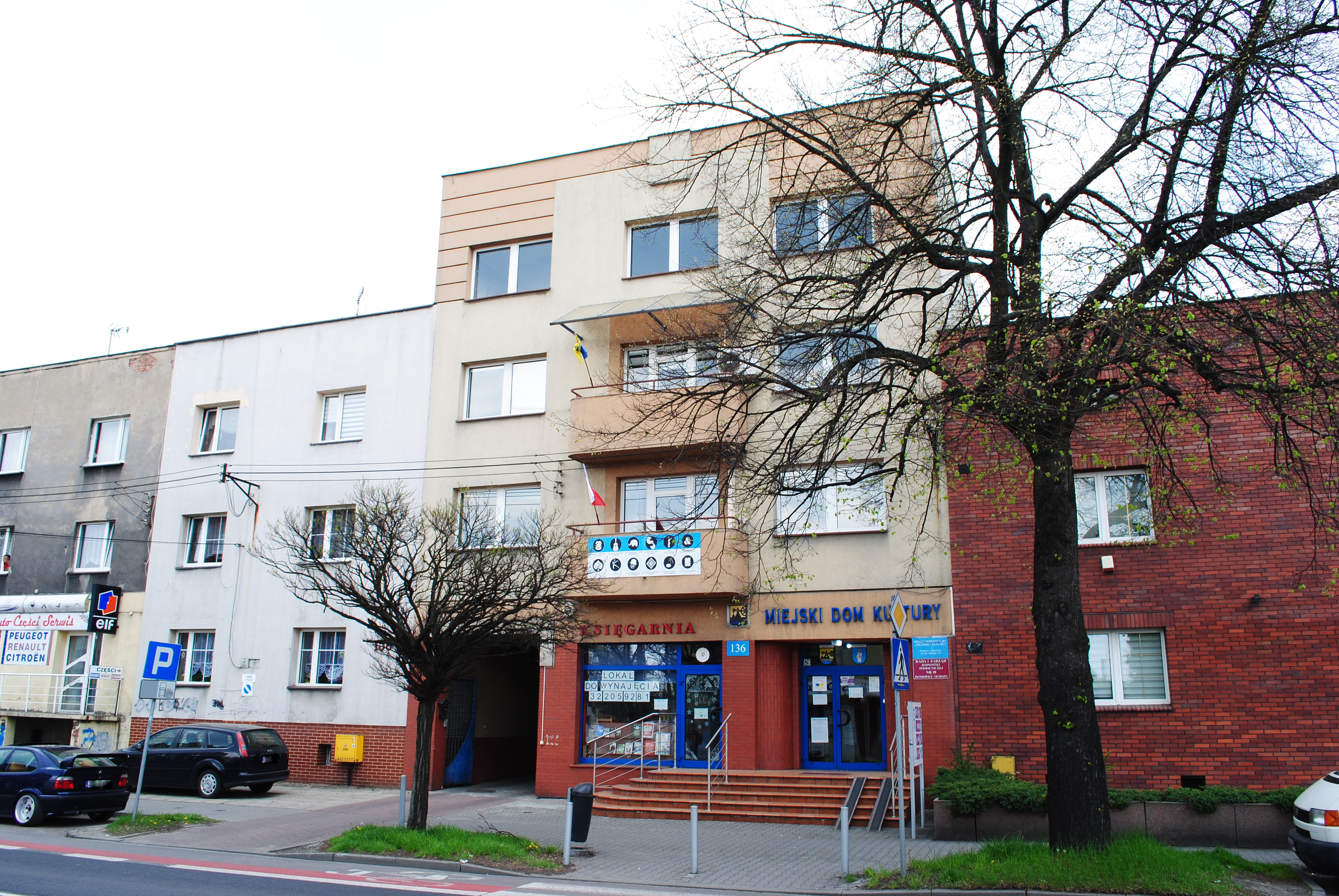
Piotrowice branch of the Municipal House of Culture Południe in Katowice (136 Walter-Janke Street)

From 1933 to 1991, the Piast cinema operated on Walter-Janke Street (now the Theater & Music Club Old Timers Garage).

Roman Pająk was associated with Piotrowice. He was a painter whose oil paintings and frescoes can be found in churches throughout Europe and in private collections. He mainly painted landscapes and sacred motifs. He died on 8 July 1964, in Piotrowice. The musical band Dżem was also founded and started its career in Piotrowice.

One of the four branches of the Municipal Cultural Center Południe in Katowice was established in Piotrowice in 2000. In the same year, the Piotrowice branch itself was founded, housed in a renovated building formerly used as a clinic. This building had previously served as the headquarters of the Piotrowice commune office. The Południe Municipal Cultural Center organizes cultural activities in the district, offering music, dance, language courses, aerobics, and handicraft classes. It also provides facilities and equipment for amateur music groups.

Since 2014, the headquarters of the Iron Theater has been located at 40 Armii Krajowej Street, in the former railway station building at the Katowice Piotrowice stop, which was slated for demolition. This theater has an amphitheater-style audience. Actress and dancer Edyta Herbuś took her first steps in the Iron Theater, debuting with the play Diwa, directed by Grzegorz Kempinsky. The Wojciech Korfanty University of Silesia inaugurates the academic year with an event called "Watermelon's Holiday", conceived by Krzysztof Skiba, the leader of the Big Cyc band, open not only to the university's students.

In Piotrowice, there is the Museum of the Smallest Book in the World, founded by the Guinness World Record holder in this category, Zygmunt Szkocny. The museum is located at 5 Traktorzystów Street.

== Religion ==
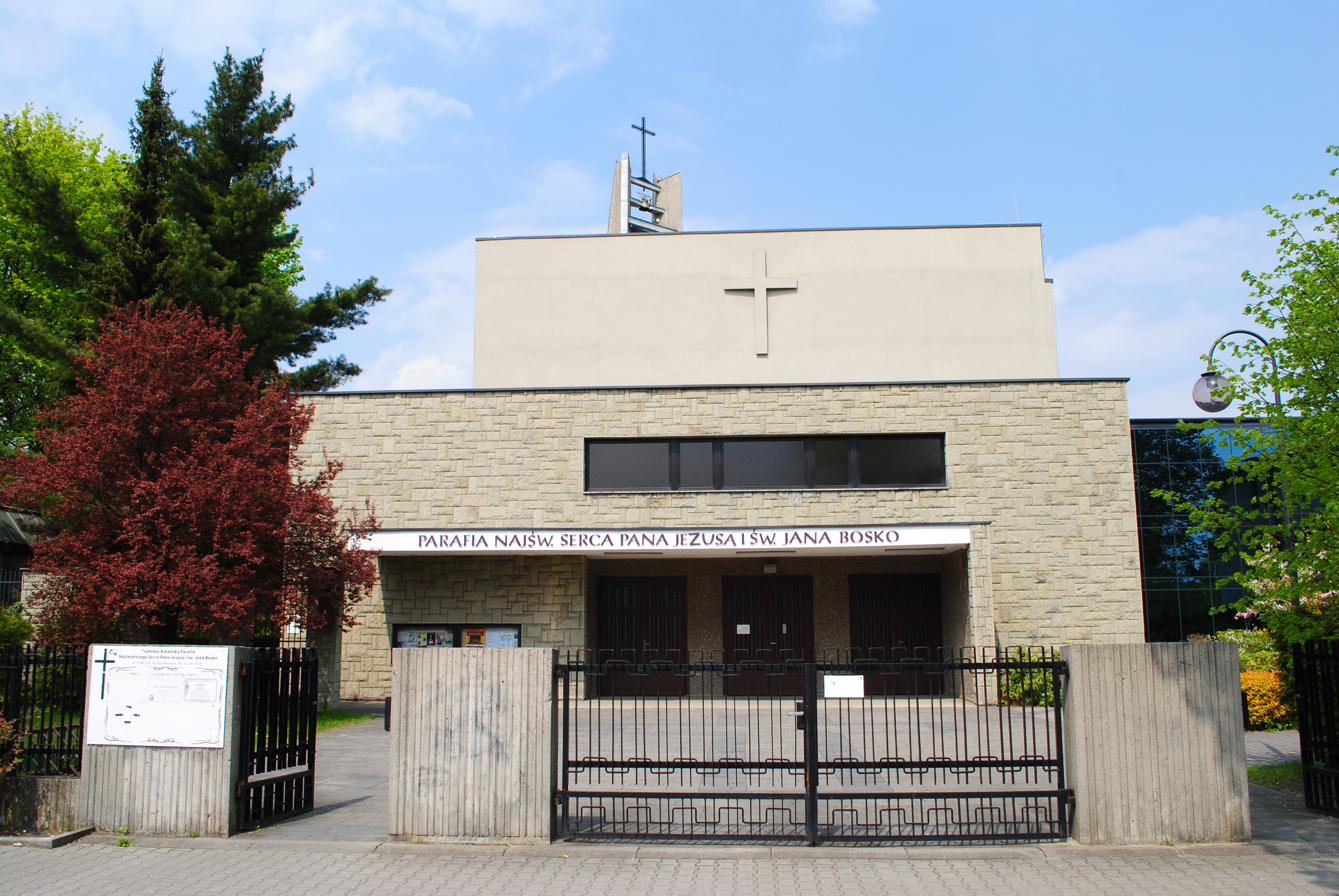
The parish church of the Sacred Heart of Jesus and St. John Bosco (Aleksander Fredro Street)

The dominant religion in Piotrowice is Catholicism. Initially, the Roman Catholic residents of Piotrowice belonged to the parish of St. Adalbert in Mikołów, established in 1222. Attempts to build a church in Piotrowice were made from 1898 or even as early as 1870 – at that time, there were plans to establish a parish covering Piotrowice, Kostuchna, Ochojec, Murcki, and Podlesie. Meanwhile, Franciscans were brought to Upper Silesia, and a decision was made to build a monastery complex in nearby Panewniki. This was related to the Germanization policy pursued by the then Bishop of Wrocław, Georg von Kopp. The establishment of a new monastery was intended to divert people and priests from pilgrimages to Częstochowa. In 1913 (or January 1914), the population of Piotrowice came under the care of the parish in Panewniki.

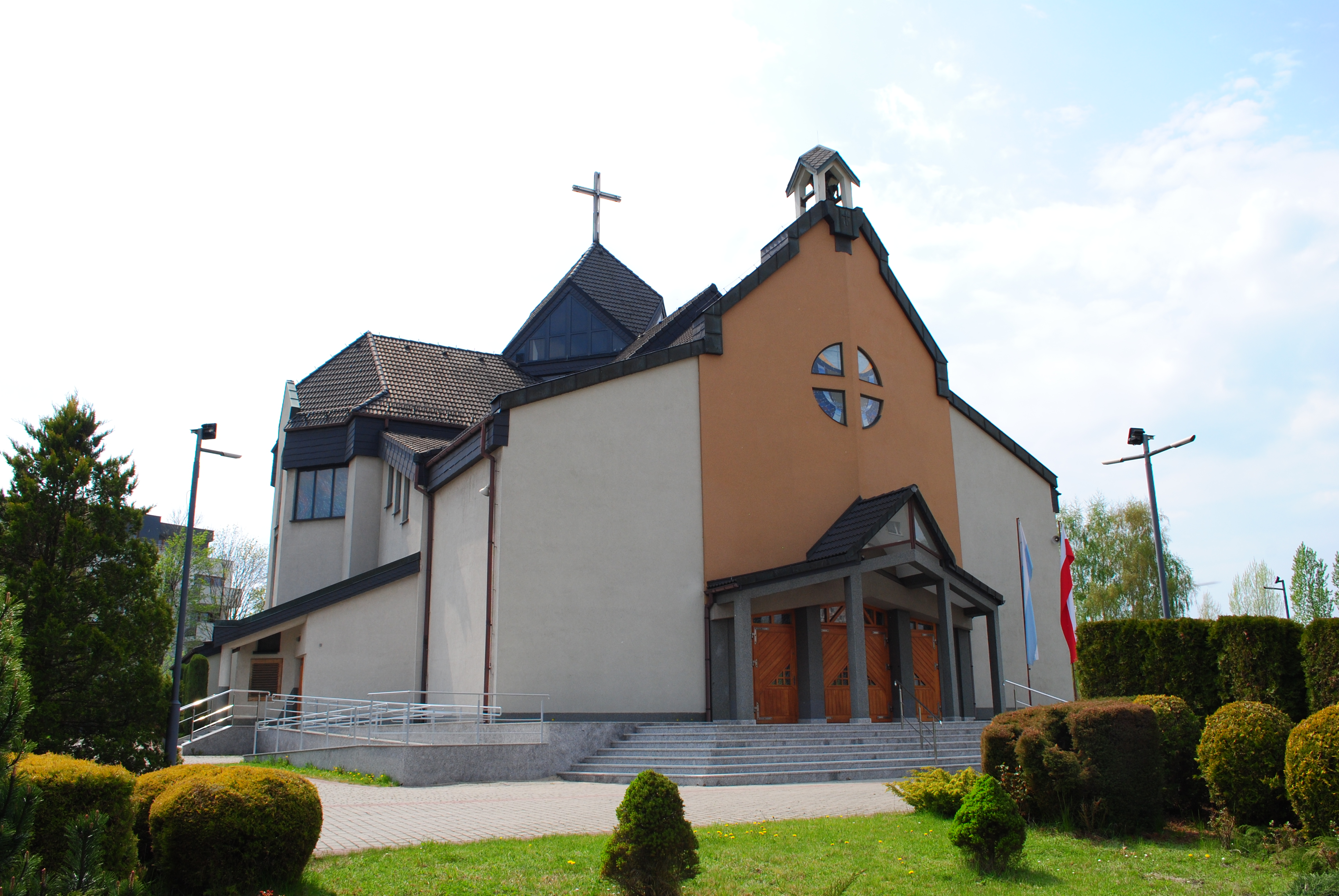
The parish church of the Most Holy Body and Blood of Christ on M. Radocki Street in the Odrodzenie housing estate

In 1930, the construction of a new temporary wooden church began in Piotrowice. The consecration of the temporary church of the Sacred Heart of Jesus took place on 26 October 1930. The curacy was established on 1 May 1931, and the parish of the Sacred Heart of Jesus was established on 2 November 1936. However, construction of the proper church did not commence due to the outbreak of World War II. In 1956, preparations for the construction of the proper church resumed, but permission for the expansion was not granted. It was not until 1974 that construction of the proper Church of the Sacred Heart of Jesus and St. John Bosco began. It was consecrated by the then Bishop of Katowice, Herbert Bednorz, on 15 December 1977. Earlier, on 9 February 1976, the Piotrowice parish gained an additional patron – St. John Bosco. The parish cemetery of the Sacred Heart of Jesus, covering an area of 2.135 hectares, is located on Armii Krajowej Street.

Due to the expansion of Piotrowice and the increasing number of residents, a decision was made in 1986 to build a new church in the Odrodzenia housing estate. On 10 June 1987, during his pilgrimage to Tarnów, Pope John Paul II laid the cornerstone for the construction of the new Church of the Most Holy Body and Blood of Christ. The builder of the church was Father Janusz Kwapiszewski. The parish was established on 1 January 1990.

In Piotrowice, from 1979 to 1986, Katarzyna Szymon lived. On 8 March 1946, stigmata appeared on her body, and she often experienced visions of the Passion of Jesus in ecstasy. People from all over the world visited her.

== Sports and recreation ==
In 1918, April 1919, or 1920, a branch of the Sokół movement was established in Piotrowice and Kostuchna, belonging to the Mikołów district. Jan Materla became the president of the branch. The movement conducted outdoor exercises, organized trips and marches, and as part of its educational activities, lectures and training sessions were held in Polish. Branch assemblies of Sokół were organized in Zadole. From 1922 to 1939, a total of 13 sports organizations operated in Piotrowice.

The first well-known football field in Piotrowice was located in Gać on the current Wspólna Street. Matches played there in the 1920s and 1930s are remembered. A more representative field was established in Skotnica – it was solemnly consecrated on 21 August 1932. The area of the former field is now occupied by allotment gardens on A. Kostka-Napierski Street. A new field was established in 1935 at the Piotrowice Machine Factory, and shortly after World War II, at the Targowisko housing estate.

In the early post-war years, three sports clubs were established within the boundaries of Piotrowice:

- Machine Factory Sports Club – active from 1946 to 1947; it had a football section and later merged with Górnik;
- ZZK Railway Workers' Trade Union – active from 1948 to 1962; it had football and table tennis sections; later became part of Kolejarz;
- ZKS District Trade Union Commission – a football club active in 1947; later merged with Kolejarz.

During the Polish People's Republic era in the 1950s, motorcycle races were organized on the streets of Piotrowice, and every few years, the Peace Race cycling competition passed through the district. Two residents of Piotrowice participated in the Olympic Games: Wanda Kaczmarczyk in Rome in 1960 (fencer) and Henryk Nielaba in Tokyo in 1964 (fencer).

In 2007, there were 8 sports clubs operating in Piotrowice.

== Bibliography ==
- Barciak, Antoni; Chojecka, Ewa; Fertacz, Sylwester, eds. (2012). Katowice. Środowisko, dzieje, kultura, język i społeczeństwo (in Polish). Vol. 1. Katowice: Muzeum Historii Katowic. ISBN 978-83-87727-24-6.
- Barciak, Antoni; Chojecka, Ewa; Fertacz, Sylwester, eds. (2012). Katowice. Środowisko, dzieje, kultura, język i społeczeństwo (in Polish). Vol. 2. Katowice: Muzeum Historii Katowic. ISBN 978-83-87727-29-1.
- Gierlotka, Stefan (2002). Piotrowice Śląskie. Monografia dzielnicy miasta Katowice (in Polish). Katowice: Wydawnictwo "Śląsk". ISBN 83-7164-364-0.
- Gierlotka, Stefan (2005). Uniczowy. Kalendarium Historii południowych dzielnic Katowic: Kostuchna, Ochojec, Piotrowice, Podlesie, Zarzecze (in Polish). Katowice: Wydawnictwo "Śląsk". ISBN 83-7164-471-X.
- "Studium uwarunkowań i kierunków zagospodarowania przestrzennego miasta Katowice – II edycja. Część 1. Uwarunkowania zagospodarowania przestrzennego" (PDF). Miasto Katowice (in Polish). 2012.
- Szaraniec, Lech (1996). Osady i osiedla Katowic (in Polish). Katowice: Oficyna "Artur". ISBN 83-905115-0-9.
