= Armii Krajowej Street, Katowice =

Street in Katowice, Poland

Armii Krajowej Street
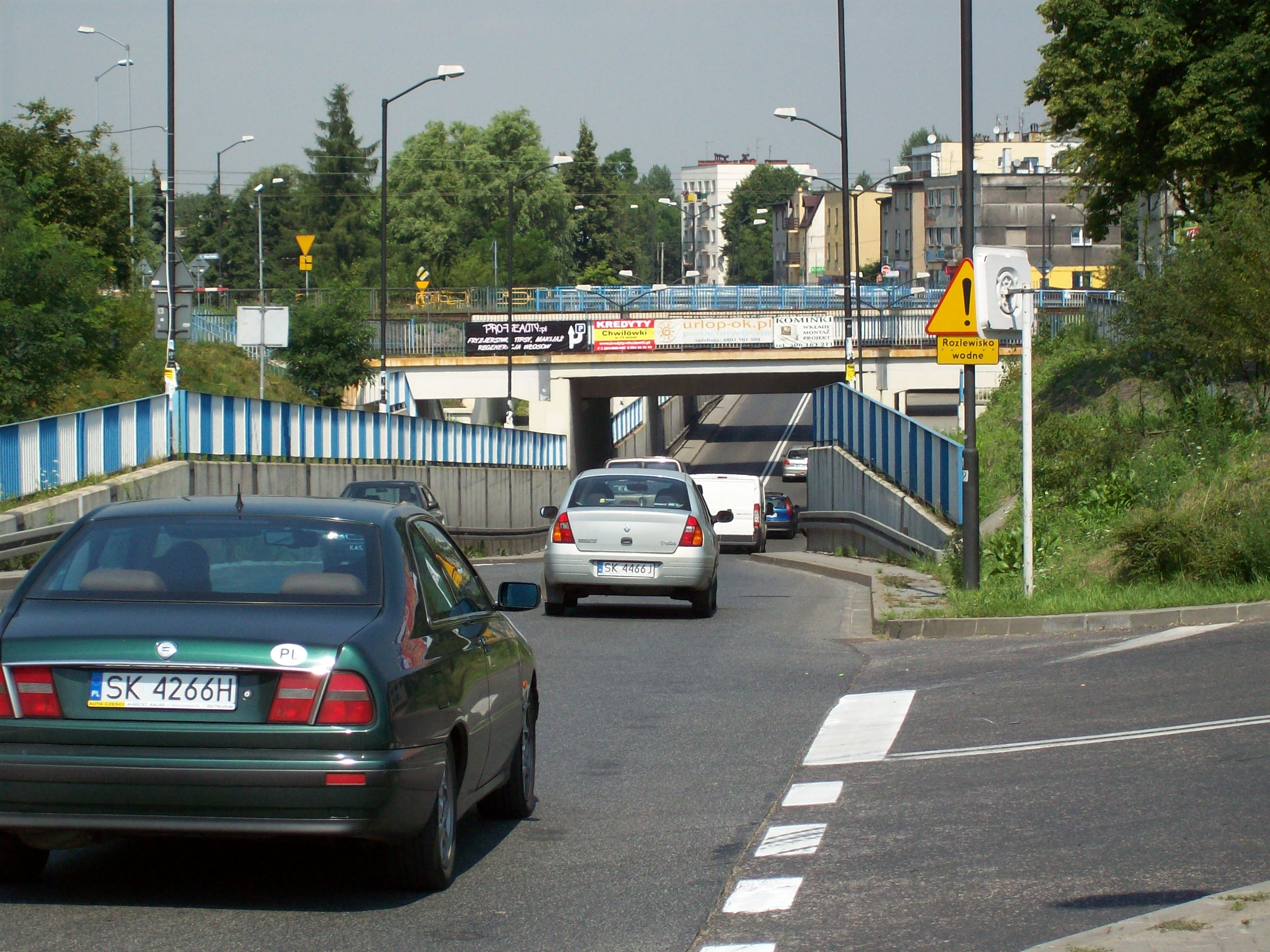
- Armii Krajowej Street (railway viaduct)
- Interactive map of Armii Krajowej Street
- Former names: Dworcowa Street, Herman Göring Strasse, Dąbrowszczaków Street
- Part of: Kostuchna, Piotrowice-Ochojec, Podlesie
- Length: 5,310 m (17,420 ft)
- Location: Katowice, Poland
- Coordinates: 50.1982600°N 18.9775245°E

Armii Krajowej Street in Katowice is a major thoroughfare in the Piotrowice-Ochojec, Kostuchna, and Podlesie districts. Running roughly north-south, it connects historic sites reflecting its role as a key link between former villages, now city districts.

== History ==
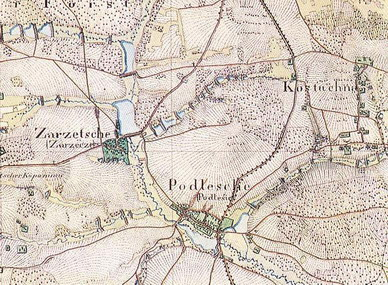
1827 map showing the road from Kostuchna to Podlesie, now Armii Krajowej Street

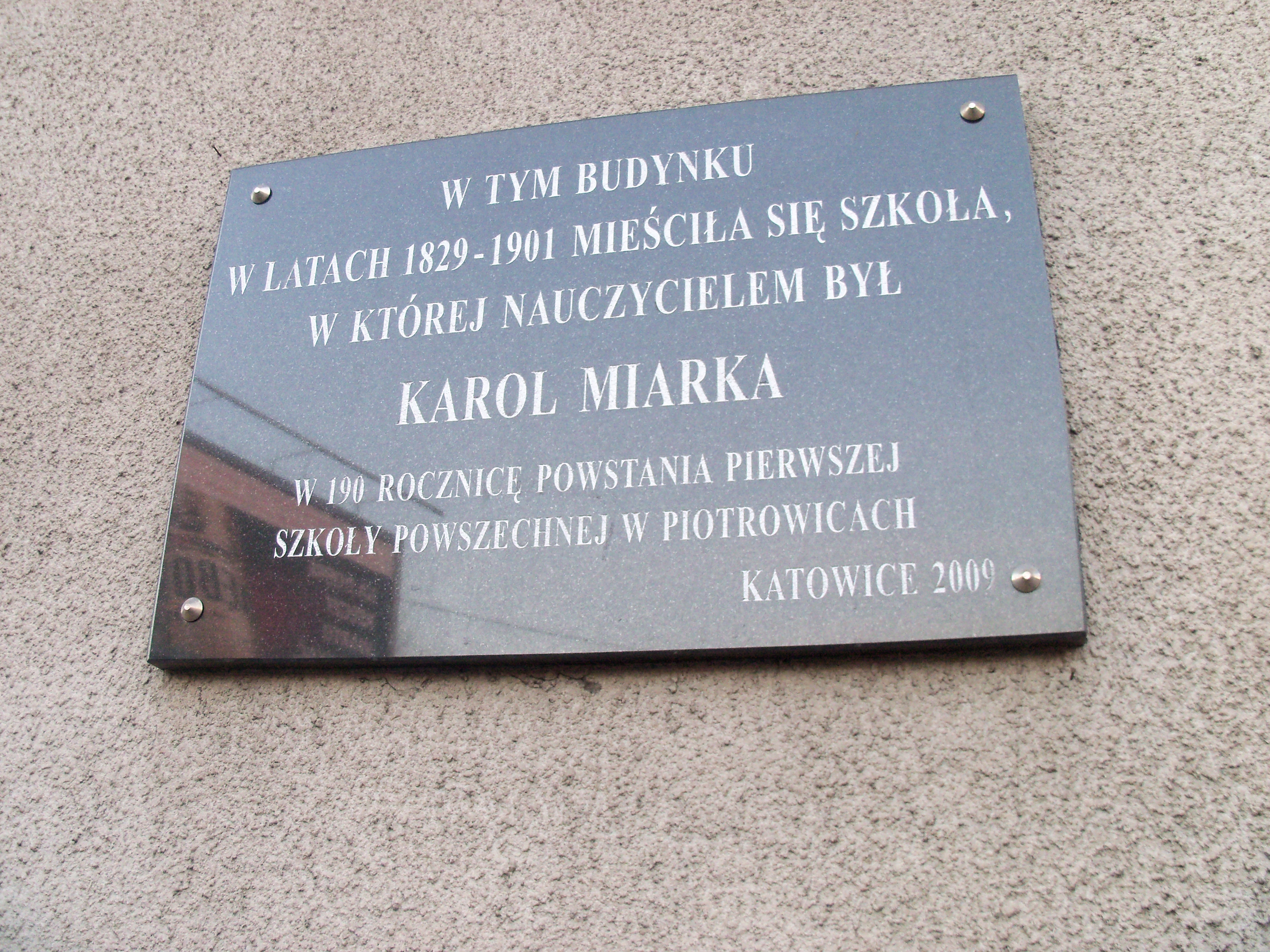
Plaque on the former public school at 104 Armii Krajowej Street

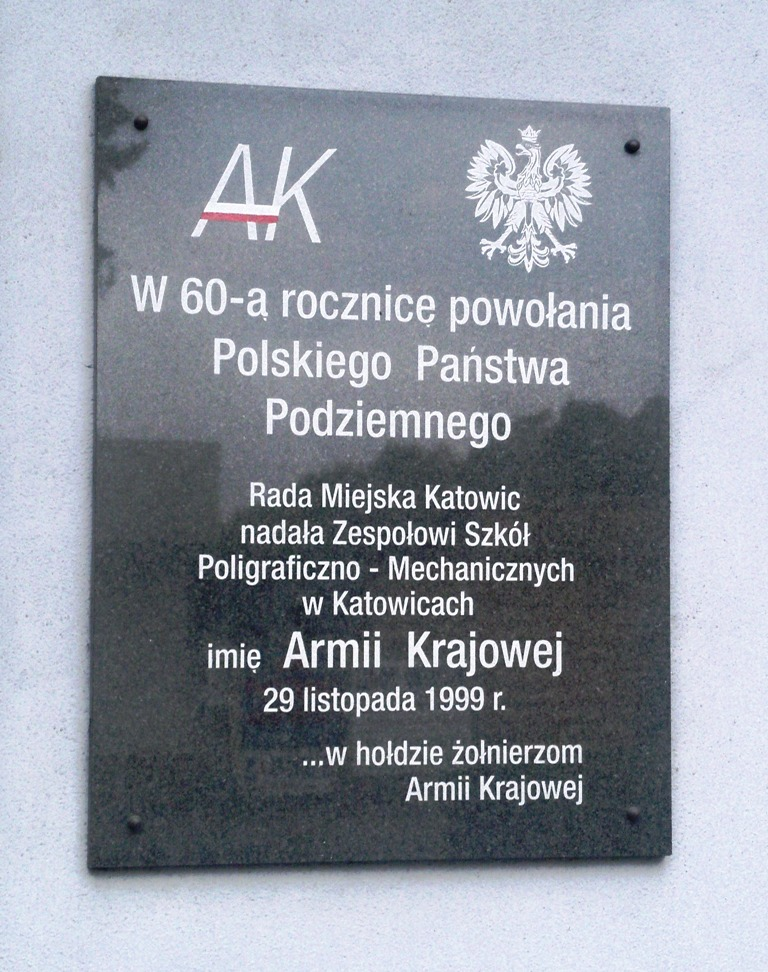
Memorial plaque on the Vocational School Complex building at Armii Krajowej Street

The road from Kostuchna to Podlesie, now Armii Krajowej Street, existed in the 18th century as a main communication route, extending to Zarzecze (now Uniczowska Street). It appeared on Christian Friedrich von Wrede's 1749 map.

From 1918 to 1939, a detention facility operated at the corner of Armii Krajowej and Kasztanowa streets, next to a 19th-century fire station with a horse-drawn fire cart. In 1928, the first petrol station in Piotrowice opened at the corner with Zygmunt Walter-Janke Street. In 1932, Teodor Tomecki built a post office at the corner with Aleksander Fredro Street, still operational today. In 1938, a cemetery for the Parish of the Sacred Heart of Jesus and St. John Bosco was established. During World War II, the Nazi Party had its office at number 45. By 1949, 49 single-family "Finnish houses" (later called Kostuchna Estate) were built near the cemetery, with water supply added in 1954. In the 1970s, a radio broadcasting station was established at 61 Armii Krajowej Street. Traffic lights were installed at the Tadeusz Kościuszko Street intersection in 1967. In the 1960s, the Młodych Estate was built between Armii Krajowej and Wczasowa streets.

Before World War II, the street was named Dworcowa; from 1939 to 1945, it was Herman Göring Strasse; and until 1990, Dąbrowszczaków Street. A grade-separated railway viaduct was constructed from 1999 to 2001 and opened on 21 November 2001.

== Infrastructure ==
Armii Krajowej Street is a public collector road. It has a Ø 125 mm water main and a Ø 200 mm low-pressure gas pipeline beneath it. Residential buildings in Piotrowice, mainly from the interwar period, include multi-family structures up to 3–4 stories along major historic routes like Zygmunt Walter-Janke Street and Armii Krajowej Street. In 2007, the intersection of Armii Krajowej, Bażantów, and Zdzisław Hierowski streets was rebuilt, creating the Rostworowski Roundabout and access to Bażantowo Estate.

== Historic buildings ==
The following structures along Armii Krajowej Street are under conservation protection:

- Freestanding residential tenements (39 and 42 Armii Krajowej Street), built in the 1930s.
- Katowice Piotrowice railway station (40a Armii Krajowej Street).
- Famur machine factory complex with a functionalist office building (41–51 Armii Krajowej Street).
- Residential tenements (46 and 48 Armii Krajowej Street).
- Former Catholic school from the early 20th century (84 Armii Krajowej Street).
- Residential house and furniture showroom (89 Armii Krajowej Street, corner with Świerkowa Street), built in the first quarter of the 20th century as an inn and dance hall.
- Residential house with outbuildings and garden (93 Armii Krajowej Street), built in the late 1920s to early 1930s.
- Residential house with outbuildings and garden (94 Armii Krajowej Street), built in the 1920s.
- Residential house with outbuildings and garden (95 Armii Krajowej Street, corner with Wojska Polskiego Street), built in the first quarter of the 20th century.
- Residential house with outbuildings and garden (181 Zygmunt Walter-Janke Street, corner with Armii Krajowej Street), built in the first quarter of the 20th century, with shops on the ground floor.
- Residential house with outbuildings (21 Wojska Polskiego Street, corner with Armii Krajowej Street), built in the early 20th century with a ground-floor extension.
- Residential house – ventilation shaft (309 Armii Krajowej Street), built before 1939.
- Residential house with outbuildings (356 Armii Krajowej Street), built after 1901.
- Residential houses (390, 392, 394 Armii Krajowej Street), built before 1939.
- Factory hall (496 Armii Krajowej Street), built in the early 20th century.

== Wayside crosses ==
The following historic wayside crosses are located along Armii Krajowej Street:

- Cross at 79 Armii Krajowej Street, erected in 1909 opposite the vocational school, commemorating a farmhand who drowned in a well at the site. The inscription reads: "Gelobt sei Jesus Christus!". Funded by Franciszek and Agata Gwóźdź, it features a Virgin Mary statue on the pedestal and was restored in 2001.
- Cross at 95 Armii Krajowej Street (corner with Wojska Polskiego Street), built in the 19th century and later moved during road construction to Kostuchna. Masses were held under it before the parish church was built. The wooden structure was replaced with metal in the 1980s. It is under conservation protection.
- Cross at the corner of Armii Krajowej and Szarych Szeregów Street, built in the 19th century. During World War II, Nazis destroyed a nearby Silesian Uprising monument pedestal. The cross was renovated in 1946 and replaced in 1999 on the opposite side of Szarych Szeregów Street.
- Cross at the corner of Armii Krajowej and Migdałowców Street, erected in 1919 by Jan and Julia Skrzydło.

== Institutions ==
The following institutions are located along Armii Krajowej Street: commercial and service businesses, restaurants, advertising agencies, housing associations, healthcare facilities, travel agencies, the Armii Krajowej Vocational School Complex in Katowice-Piotrowice (Post-Secondary School No. 2, Technical School No. 18, Vocational School No. 15), and law offices.

== Bibliography ==
- Gierlotka, Stefan (2002). Piotrowice Śląskie. Monografia dzielnicy miasta Katowice [Piotrowice Śląskie. Monograph of a Katowice District] (in Polish). Katowice: Śląsk. ISBN 83-7164-364-0.
