= Murcki Coal Mine =

Coal mine in Katowice, Silesian Voivodeship, Poland

Coordinates: 50.18106°N 19.00770°E

Murcki coal mine
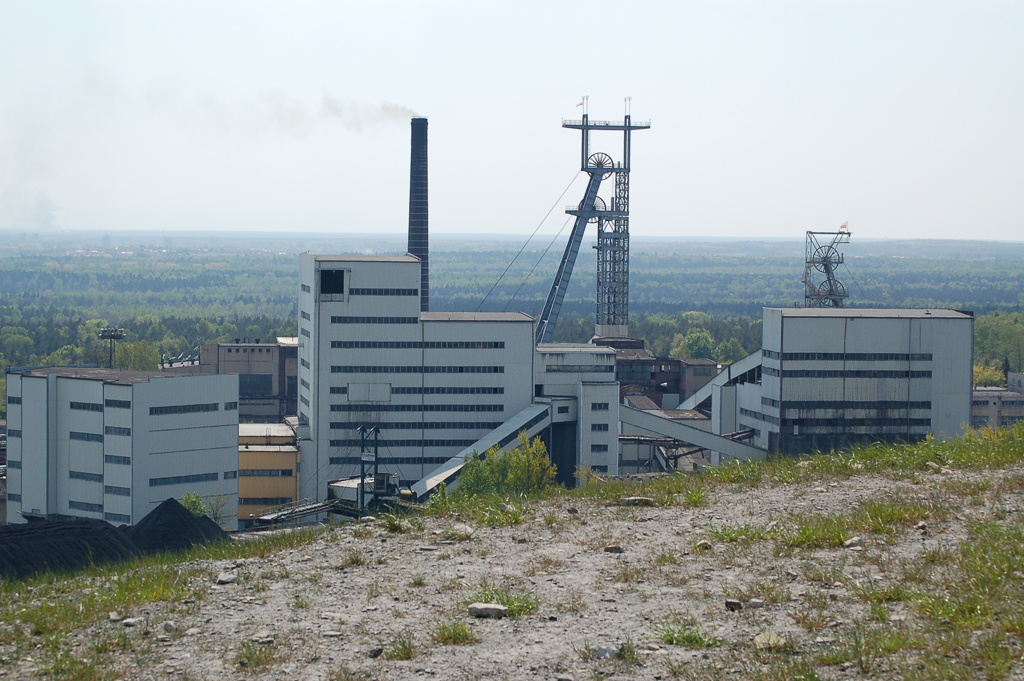
- KWK Murcki
- Interactive map of Murcki coal mine
- Location: Katowice, Silesian Voivodeship, Poland
- Products: Coal
- Production: 3,800,000
- Opened: 1657
- Company: Katowicki Holding Węglowy

The Murcki coal mine is a large mine in the south of Poland in Katowice, Silesian Voivodeship, 260 km south-west of the capital, Warsaw. Murcki represents one of the largest coal reserve in Poland having estimated reserves of 228.2 million tonnes of coal. The annual coal production is around 3.8 million tonnes.
