= Podlesie, Katowice =

Podlesie
- Katowice District
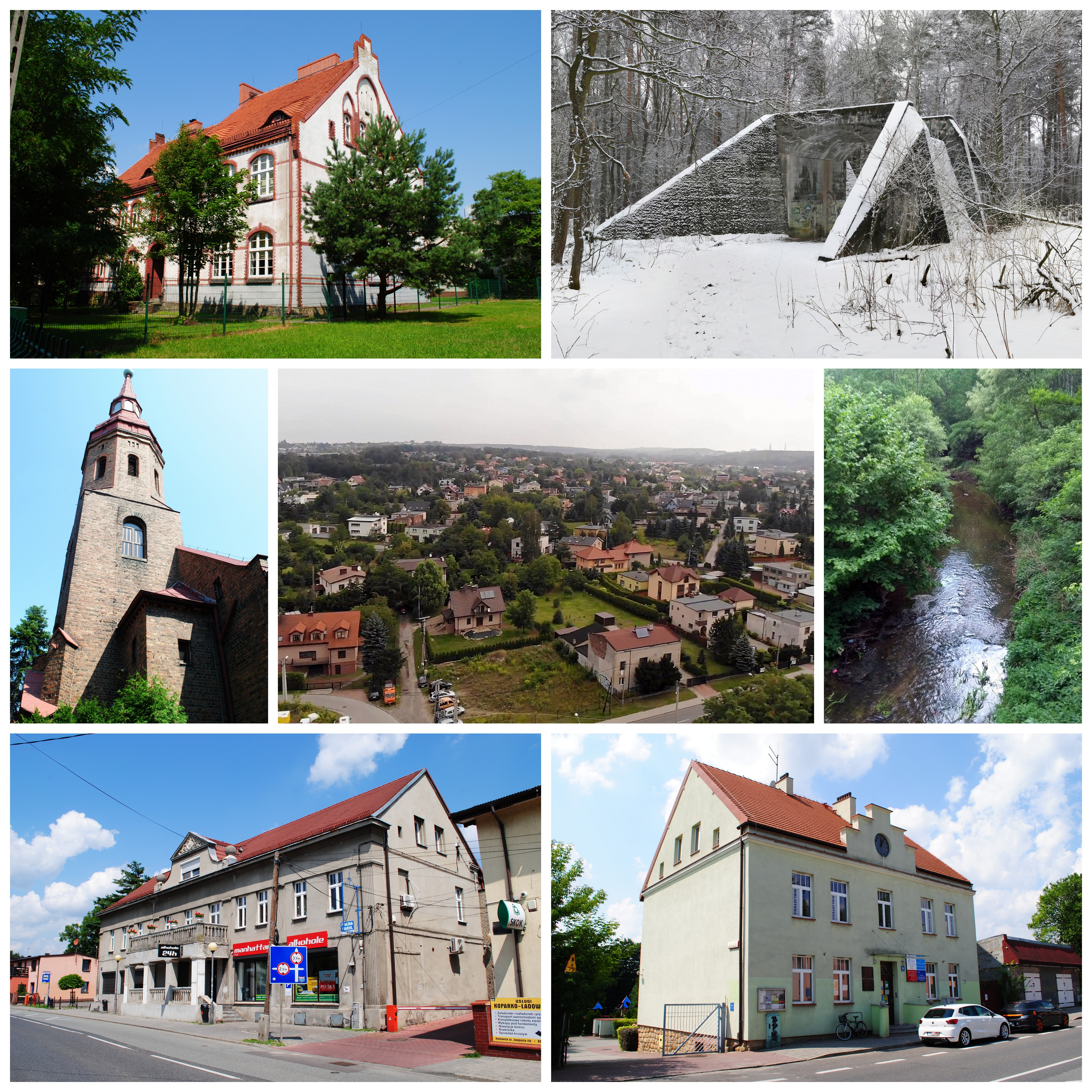
- Podlesie

- Location of Podlesie within Katowice
- Coordinates: 50°10′36.82″N 18°58′9.18″E
- Country: Poland
- Voivodeship: Silesian
- County/City: Katowice

Area
  - Total: 8.28 km^{2} (3.20 sq mi)

Population (2007)
  - Total: 5,240
  - Density: 633/km^{2} (1,640/sq mi)
- Time zone: UTC+1 (CET)
  - Summer (DST): UTC+2 (CEST)
- Area code: (+48) 032

Podlesie (German: Podlesche) is a district of Katowice. It has an area of 8.28 km^{2} and in 2007 had 5,240 inhabitants.

== History ==
The oldest settlement in the area of what are now the districts Piotrowice, Podlesie and Zarzecze was Uniczowy, a village that existed already in the 12th century. In the 15th century Uniczowy began to crumble into three distinct parts. Podlesie was first mentioned in 1468 as Uniczowy-Podlesie.

During the political upheaval caused by Matthias Corvinus the land around Pszczyna was overtaken by Casimir II, Duke of Cieszyn, who sold it in 1517 to the Hungarian magnates of the Thurzó family, forming the Pless state country. In the accompanying sales document issued on 21 February 1517 the village was mentioned as Podlesy Vnicziowy. The Kingdom of Bohemia in 1526 became part of the Habsburg monarchy. In the War of the Austrian Succession most of Silesia was conquered by the Kingdom of Prussia, including the village. Despite that, most of the inhabitants of the village were Poles. In the Upper Silesia Plebiscite in 1921, 93,2% of the inhabitants of Podlesie voted for joining Poland (1082 votes for Poland and 79 votes for Germany). In 1922 Podlesie became part of Second Polish Republic (interwar Poland). In 1939-1945 Podlesie was occupated by Nazi Germany, but was liberated in 1945 and returned to Poland (from 1945 to 1989 People's Republic of Poland, from 1989 current Poland, known as Third Republic of Poland.

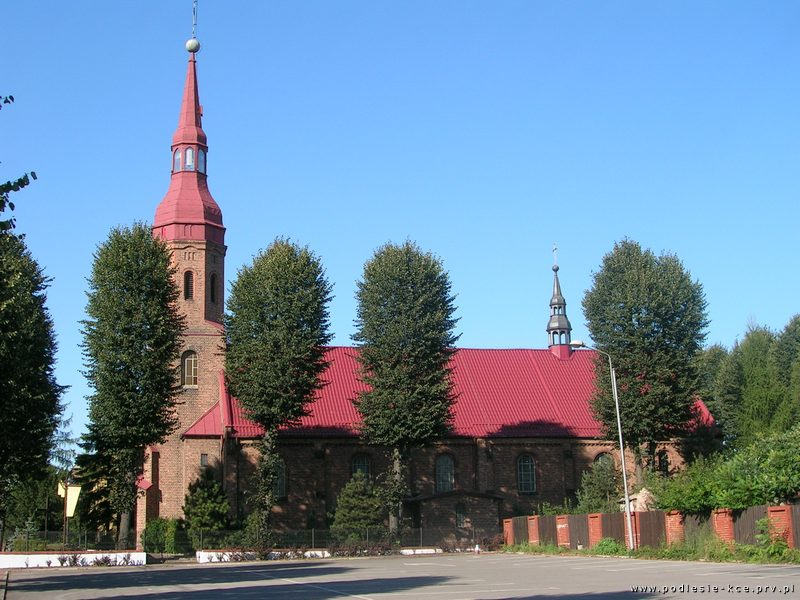
Saint Mary of Częstochowa church, built in 1920
