= Kostuchna =

- Katowice District
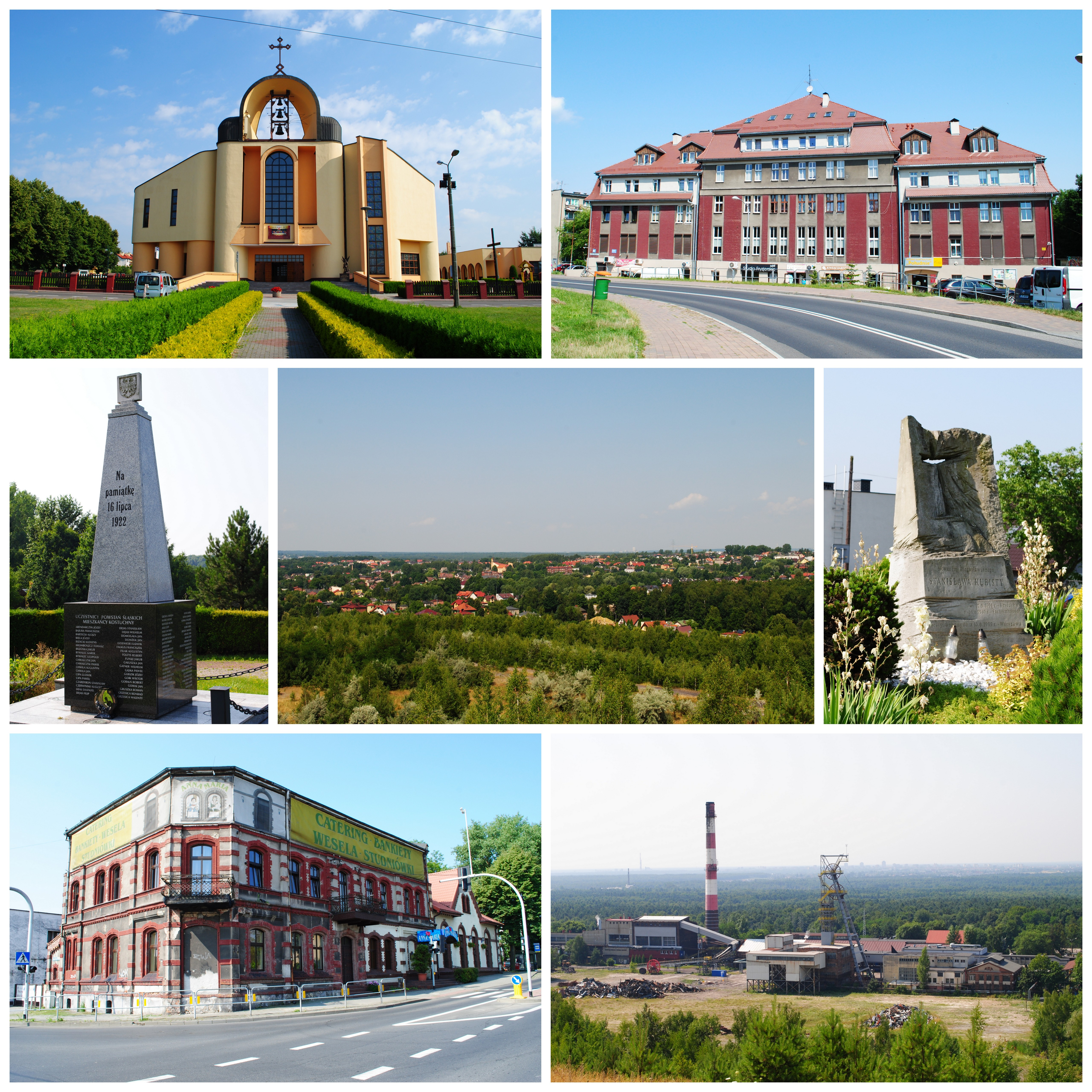

- Location of Kostuchna within Katowice
- Coordinates: 50°11′19.85″N 18°59′28.3″E
- Country: Poland
- Voivodeship: Silesian
- County/City: Katowice

Area
  - Total: 8.59 km^{2} (3.32 sq mi)

Population (2007)
  - Total: 8,233
  - Density: 958/km^{2} (2,480/sq mi)
- Time zone: UTC+1 (CET)
  - Summer (DST): UTC+2 (CEST)
- Area code: (+48) 032

Kostuchna (German: Kostuchna) is a district of Katowice. It has an area of 8.59 km^{2} and in 2007 had 8,233 inhabitants.

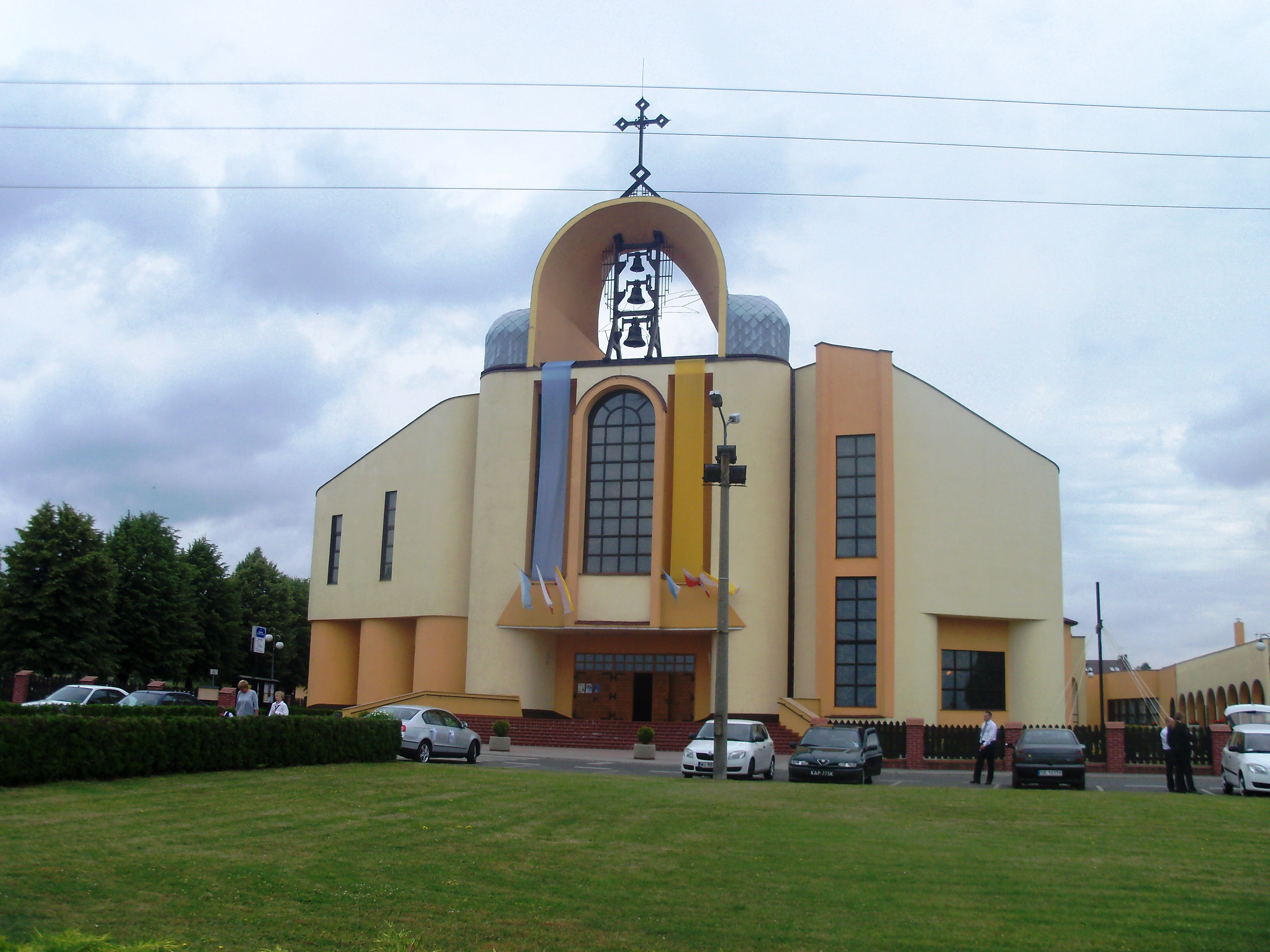
Holy Trinity church
