= Katowice beboks =

Outdoor sculptures in Katowice, Poland

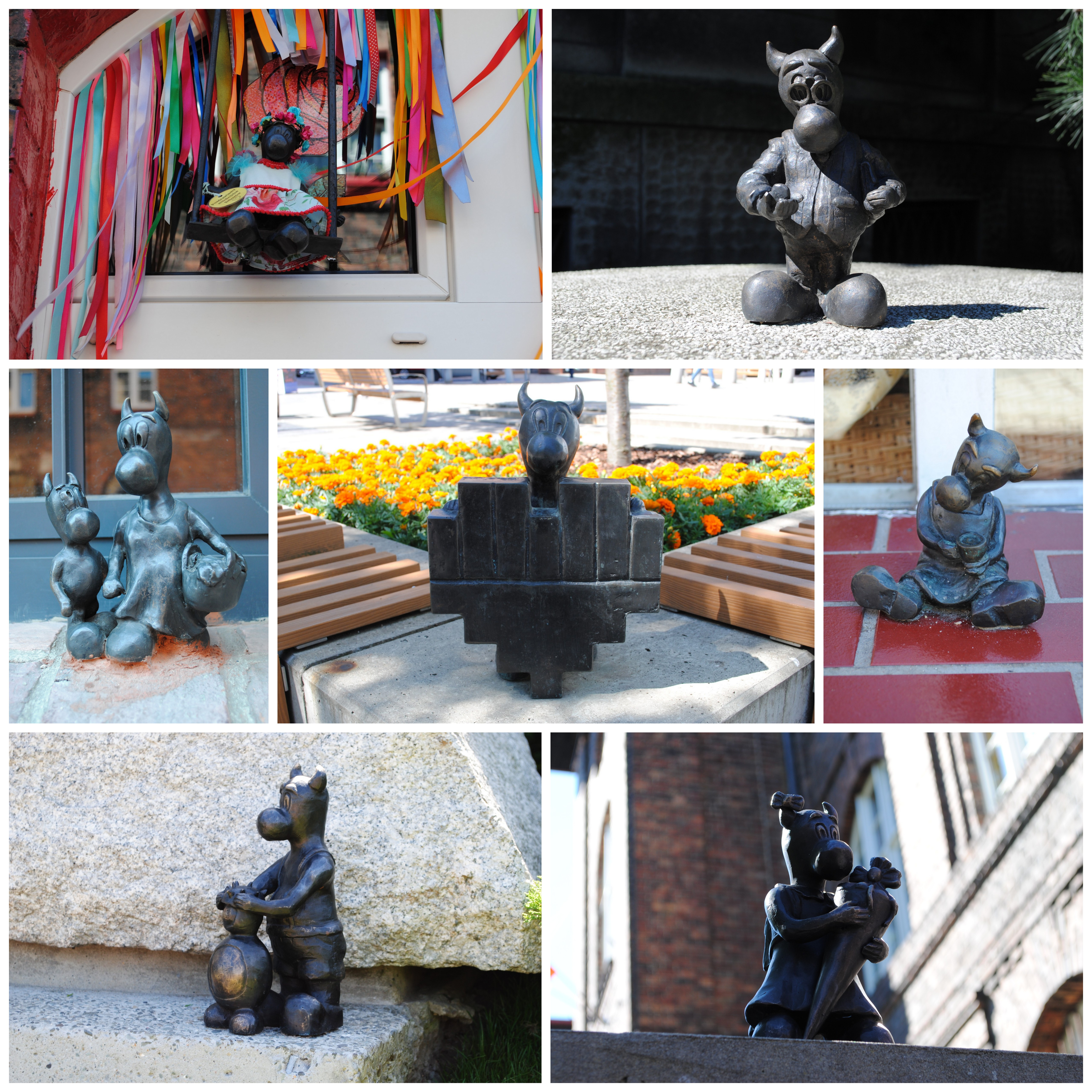
- Collage showing selected bebok figurines: Gretka, Anton, Sztefa i Erwinek, Florka, Michalino, Witosiak, and Dorka (2024)
- Artist: Grzegorz Chudy (design); Dariusz Kik, Karolina Piechota (execution)
- Year: 2021
- Medium: Bronze
- Location: Katowice, Sopot

Katowice beboks are a collection of small outdoor sculptures portraying characters from Slavic folklore known as beboks, scattered across various locations in Katowice, Poland. Initiated and designed by Katowice artist Grzegorz Chudy, the first beboks were installed in July 2021 in the Nikiszowiec district.

These sculptures are often compared to the Wrocław Dwarfs or the Zielona Góra Bachusiki, serving as a tourist attraction in Katowice. Earlier attempts at similar figurines, introduced on 7 September 2017 as part of the Silesian Dialect Trail, were short-lived due to theft and vandalism.

== Appearance ==
The Katowice beboks are a series of small outdoor sculptures depicting the Slavic demon bebok in varied forms with distinct attributes. Conceived by Katowice artist Grzegorz Chudy, whose studio is located at 9/4 Odrowążów Street in Nikiszowiec, the beboks are portrayed as friendly creatures, inspired by a drawing Chudy created for a child.

Typically commissioned by businesses, local communities, or institutions, the figurines are funded independently or through crowdfunding and sales of commemorative items. The creation process begins with a sketch, followed by a watercolor, and culminates in a bronze casting crafted in a Zabrze workshop run by Dariusz Kik and Karolina Piechota.

Beyond sculptures, beboks appear as magnets, Christmas cards, watercolors, and plush toys produced by Ewa Kapias of the KrysKa Designe Handicraft Association, based at 11 St. Anna Street in Katowice.

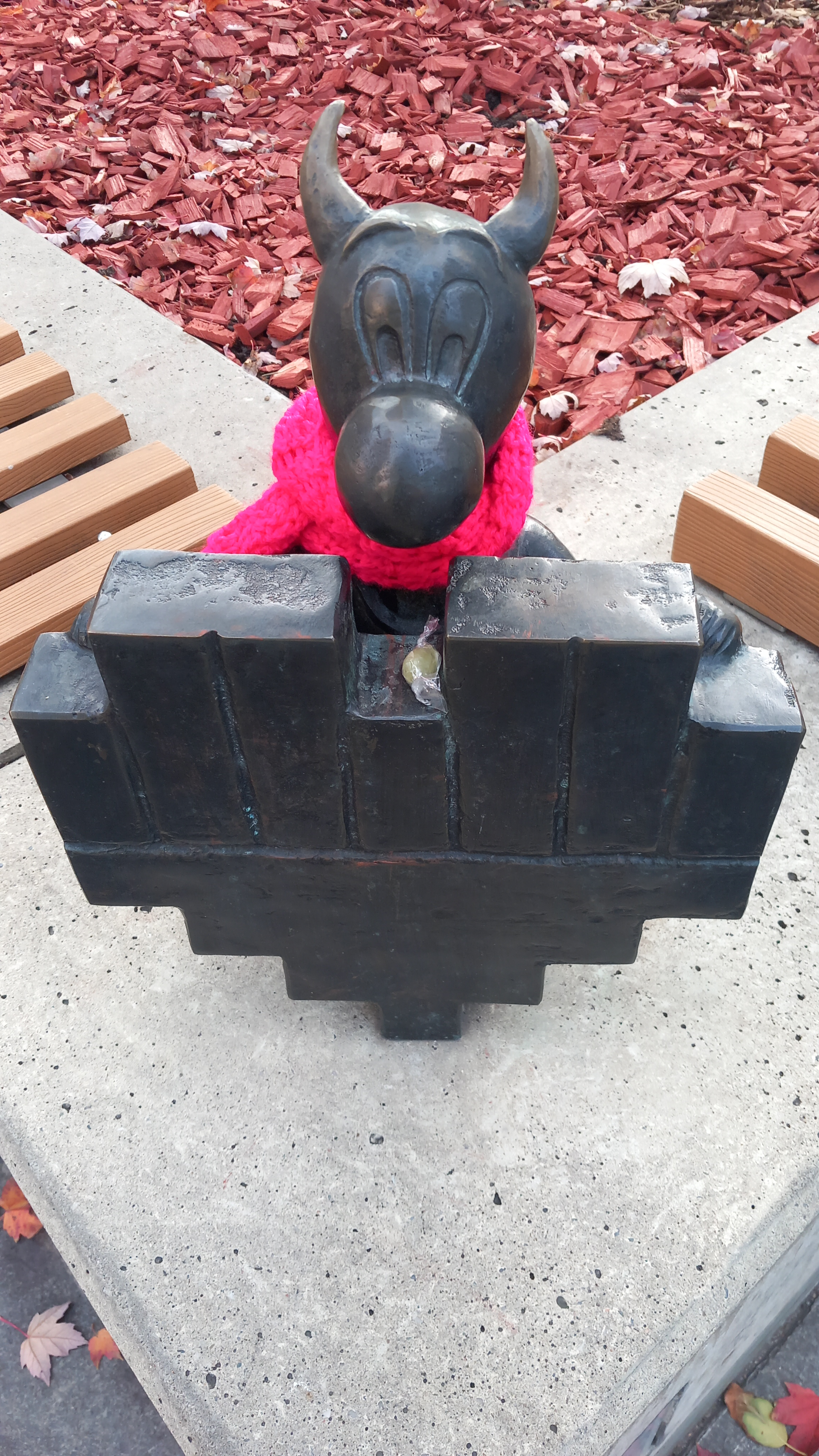
Florka in a pink scarf (2024)

The beboks are a tourist attraction in Katowice, akin to Wrocław Dwarfs or Zielona Góra Bachusiki. They form the Katowice Bebok Trail. Visitors can collect stamps to earn a "Bebok Hunter" badge. Residents and institutions often dress the beboks in seasonal outfits, such as winter clothing, Halloween costumes, or accessories for social campaigns.

== List of beboks ==
=== Beboks by Grzegorz Chudy in Katowice ===
Katowice beboks (as of 7 October 2025)
No.	Name	Description	Year	Location	Coordinates	Image	Source
1	Wincynt	Bebok symbolizing a miner	2021	Janów-Nikiszowiec; near the Nikiszowiec model in front of the Church of St. Anne	50°14′37.0″N 19°04′56.3″E		
2	Michalino	Female bebok holding a coffee mug	2021	Janów-Nikiszowiec; on the Cafe Byfyj's windowsill, B. Krawczyk Street	50°14′36.2″N 19°04′51.9″E		
3–4	Frelka i Miglanc	Beboks depicted returning from shopping	2021	Śródmieście; outside the main entrance to Galeria Katowicka (30 3 Maja Street)	50°15′33.9″N 19°01′05.3″E		
5	Kuklok	Bebok as a firefighter, named after Adam Kusz's nickname from the Volunteer Fire Department in Dąbrówka Mała	2022	Dąbrówka Mała; outside the Volunteer Fire Department (33 Strzelców Bytomskich Street)	50°16′45.9″N 19°04′05.8″E		
6	Fazan	Bebok as a builder, named "pheasant" in Silesian dialect	2022	Kostuchna; on the fountain enclosure at Bażantowo Estate (Bażantów Street)	50°11′59.1″N 18°58′43.4″E		
7	Bebook	Bebok symbolizing a literature enthusiast	2022	Śródmieście; by a lamppost in the courtyard of the Youth Palace (26 Mikołowska Street)	50°15′16.8″N 19°00′41.8″E		
8	Jorguś	Bebok escaping from Grzegorz Chudy's "Atelier z akwarelami" gallery	2022	Janów-Nikiszowiec; by a familok window at the A. Czechowa and Odrowążów streets intersection	50°14′29.5″N 19°04′53.5″E		
9	Mikoś	Bebok as a talented footballer and student	2022	Załęska Hałda-Brynów; at the entrance to the Complex of Technical and General Education Schools nr 2 (131 Mikołowska Street)	50°14′39.3″N 18°59′45.7″E		
10	Ernest	Bebok as a hockey player, commemorating Marek Pohl of Naprzód Janów	2022	Janów-Nikiszowiec; outside Jantor ice rink (10 Z. Nałkowska Street)	50°14′42.2″N 19°04′56.6″E		
11	Bōnclok	Bebok holding cutlery	2022	Śródmieście; in the restaurant area of Galeria Katowicka (30 3 Maja Street)	50°15′33.5″N 19°01′04.6″E		
12	Boguć	Bebok inspecting a teacup	2022	Zawodzie; on the windowsill of a shop at the Porcelana Śląska factory (23 Porcelanowa Street)	50°15′17.7″N 19°03′44.7″E		
13	Ferdynand	Bebok as a miner	2022	Bogucice; in the central part of Bogucice Park (Kopalniana Street)	50°15′49.0″N 19°02′18.3″E		
14	Florka	Female bebok holding Katowice's logo (a heart-shaped sigil)	2023	Śródmieście; at Kwiatowy Square (Market Square)	50°15′31.8″N 19°01′17.0″E		
15	Artur	Bebok in a loose hoodie with a spray can	2023	Kostuchna; outside Dagma Art gallery at Bażantowo Estate (4/1 A. Puchała Street)	50°11′58.1″N 18°58′47.6″E		
16	Kasia	Female bebok as a student with a backpack and quill	2023	Śródmieście; at the entrance to Adam Mickiewicz High School (11 Adam Mickiewicz Street)	50°15′41.4″N 19°01′04.6″E		
17	Ewald	Bebok as an artist painting Giszowiec, named after Ewald Gawlik of the Janów Group	2023	Giszowiec; at the entrance to the Szopienice-Giszowiec Municipal Cultural Center (1 Pod Lipami Square)	50°13′19.1″N 19°04′02.4″E		
18	Halabardzik	Bebok holding a halberd, linked to the center's activities	2023	Ligota-Panewniki; at the Bezpieczna Twierdza Intergenerational Integration Center (13 Panewnicka Street)	50°13′31.5″N 18°58′16.8″E		
19	Szperhok Szperhok II	Bebok holding a key to a large padlock (second bebok inside the shop)	2023	Koszutka; at the entrance to Silesian Security Center (11 G. Morcinek Street)	50°16′04.5″N 19°01′17.9″E		
20	Baśka	Female bebok with a bow, holding scissors	2023	Bogucice; at the entrance to a hair salon (36 Wrocławska Street)	50°15′58.7″N 19°02′40.2″E		
21	Sajdoczek	Bebok as a basketball player, commemorating physical education teacher Tadeusz Sajda	2023	Piotrowice-Ochojec; outside W. Szafer Elementary School (18 S. Łętowski Street)	50°12′16.6″N 18°59′12.0″E		
22	Hercklekotek	Bebok as a studious student sitting on books	2023	Śródmieście; outside the library of the Medical University of Silesia (14 Warszawska Street)	50°15′32.6″N 19°01′32.3″E		
23	Statusia	Female bebok holding a laptop with a bar chart nearby	2023	Wełnowiec-Józefowiec; at the Statistical Office in Katowice (3 Owocowa Street)	50°16′37.6″N 19°01′26.3″E		
24	Szwajka	Female bebok-podologist, reminding people to care for their feet	2023	Śródmieście; on the windowsill of a medical office at 11/1 Francuska Street	50°15′22.0″N 19°01′39.6″E		
25	Rajza	Female bebok-tourist wearing a hat and pulling a suitcase	2023	Śródmieście; at Mercure hotel (6 Młyńska Street)	50°15′30.1″N 19°01′09.2″E		
26	Katewuś	Bebok stacking blocks resembling KTW office buildings	2023	Koszutka; on a square near KTW office buildings (1 Walenty Roździeński Avenue)	50°15′51.3″N 19°01′36.2″E		
27–28	Sztefa i Erwinek	Two figurines referencing the Nikiszowiec mangle, named after Stefania Blaut and Erwin Sówka of the Janów Group	2023	Janów-Nikiszowiec; on the windowsill of the Department of Urban Ethnology of the Katowice Historical Museum (4 Rymarska Street)	50°14′38.8″N 19°04′55.3″E		
29	Uncjusz	Bebok holding a gold coin	2023	Śródmieście; outside a currency exchange near Wawelska Street	50°15′33.7″N 19°01′10.7″E		
30	Harmonia	Female bebok standing on a balance beam	2023	Szopienice-Burowiec; at the Psychiatry Center in Katowice (27 J. Korczak Street)	50°16′17.7″N 19°05′03.6″E		
31	Francik	Bebok holding a sparrow, referencing St. Francis of Assisi	2023	Ligota-Panewniki; at the Franciszkańskie Estate square (35 Książęca Street)	50°13′50.1″N 18°57′50.8″E		
32	Wituś	Bebok in a military beret holding a shield, reflecting the school's educational profile	2023	Osiedle Witosa; inside Witold Pilecki High School (87 Obroki Street)	50°15′58.7″N 18°57′55.3″E		
33	Gretka	Female bebok sitting on a swing	2023	Janów-Nikiszowiec; in the window of KrysKa Designe studio (11 St. Anna Street)	50°14′31.9″N 19°04′51.9″E		
34–35	KlachUla i Kneflik	Two figurines; KlachUla holds a traditional phone, Kneflik a smartphone	2023	Dąb; outside Face2Face Business Campus (2 Żelazna Street)	50°16′01.3″N 19°00′33.2″E		
36	Pelagia	Female bebok in winter clothing holding a radiator	2023	Bogucice; at the Dalkia company building (14 Father F. Ścigała Street)	50°15′54.7″N 19°02′22.6″E		
37	Majster	Bebok holding the letters "Z", "D", and "Z"	2023	Śródmieście; at the entrance to Vocational Education and Training Centre (2 Zygmunt Krasiński Street)	50°15′20.3″N 19°01′51.9″E		
38	Hasik	Bebok standing on a garbage truck	2023	Śródmieście; at the Municipal Public Utilities Company base (10 Bankowa Street)	50°15′35.4″N 19°01′42.3″E		
39	Jurek	Bebok commemorating mountaineer Jerzy Kukuczka, a school alumnus, climbing the building facade	2023	Bogucice; on the facade of St. Barbara Elementary School (42–44 Walery Wróblewski Street)	50°16′06.9″N 19°02′29.1″E		
40	Antenek	Bebok as a reporter holding a microphone	2023	Śródmieście; at the entrance to Polish Radio Katowice (29 Juliusz Ligoń Street)	50°15′11.4″N 19°01′16.6″E		
41	Dochtorka Cila	Female bebok as a pediatrician	2023	Brynów-Osiedle Zgrzebnioka; at Bluemed Clinic (6 St. Hubert Street)	50°13′45.2″N 18°59′49.7″E		
42	Anton	Bebok as an official, named after Anton Uthemann	2023	Szopienice-Burowiec; outside the former Szopienice City Hall (24 Wiosny Ludów Street)	50°15′43.7″N 19°05′56.6″E		
43–44	Staś i Hela	Bebok pair as students; Staś gives Hela a poppy flower	2024	Koszutka; outside Stanisław Maczek High School (54 Katowicka Street)	50°16′10.3″N 19°01′45.2″E		
45	Gajerek	Bebok in an elegant suit	2024	Koszutka; on the windowsill of a clothing store (23 G. Morcinek Street)	50°16′06.1″N 19°01′11.0″E		
46	Dentruś	Bebok as a dentist	2024	Wełnowiec-Józefowiec; at a dental clinic (49 Piotr Ściegienny Street)	50°16′38.2″N 19°00′31.3″E		
47	Konopiusz	Bebok with a newspaper cap holding a paintbrush	2024	Śródmieście; outside Maria Konopnicka High School (6 B. Głowacki Street)	50°15′06.9″N 19°00′38.5″E		
48	Zefel	Bebok with tools and gadgets	2024	Śródmieście; by the Guild of Various Crafts and Entrepreneurship (32 Adam Mickiewicz Street)	50°15′45.0″N 19°00′53.7″E		
49	Akademikus	Bebok dressed in a gown and biretta, holding a rector's scepter in its hand	2024	Piotrowice-Ochojec; at the building of the Katowice Business University (3 Harcerzy Września 1939 Street)	50°12′44.2″N 18°58′37.9″E		
50	Szpilok	Bebok as a gamer, holding a game controller in his hand and wearing headphones with a microphone on his head	2024	Śródmieście; in the patio of the Global Office Park complex (17–19 Zabrska Street)	50°15′48.3″N 19°00′43.5″E		
51	Stawik	Bebok as an angler, fishing from the ponds	2024	Osiedle Paderewskiego – Muchowiec; in front of the 3 Stawy shopping mall (60 K. Pułaska Street)	50°14′36.9″N 19°02′11.1″E		
52	Bazyl	Bebok as a pizzaiolo, holding a pizza and a pizza peel	2024	Bogucice; at the pizzeria (38 Katowicka Street)	50°16′07.9″N 19°01′57.1″E		
53	Doradziejka	Female bebok holding a collection of tax regulations in one hand and an umbrella in the other	2024	Koszutka; at the fountain (Grunwald Square)	50°16′06.1″N 19°01′19.0″E		
54	Taryfiorz	Bebok sitting in a car	2024	Piotrowice-Ochojec; at the headquarters of a transport company (42b Zbożowa Street)	50°12′47.6″N 18°58′39.7″E		
55	Lusia	Female bebok named after Łucja Staniczek, a promoter of Upper Silesian culture	2024	Piotrowice-Ochojec; at Municipal Kindergarten No. 93 (24 S. Łętowski Street)	50°12′17.7″N 18°59′14.0″E		
56	Karlik	Bebok holding a stove in his hand	2024	Osiedle Witosa; at the S. Ligoń Elementary School (23 Wincenty Witos Street)	50°15′35.6″N 18°58′21.1″E		
57	Tauzenik	Bebok holding a large ear of corn in his hands, referencing the nearby high-rise complex	2024	Osiedle Tysiąclecia; on a square at 8 Zawisza Czarny Street	50°16′48.9″N 18°58′40.9″E		
58	Szerlok	Bebok in the role of a detective	2024	Śródmieście; at the entrance to the Faculty of Law and Administration of the University of Silesia (11b Bankowa Street)	50°15′37.8″N 19°01′55.9″E		
59	Witosiak	Bebok arranging a figure made of chestnuts	2024	Osiedle Witosa; at St. Herbert's Square	50°15′33.9″N 18°58′08.1″E		
60	Dorka	Female bebok standing with a Schultüte; her name refers to Prof. Dorota Simonides, who was a graduate of the school	2024	Janów-Nikiszowiec; by the Stefan Żeromski Elementary School (18 Wyzwolenia Square)	50°14′35.9″N 19°05′01.2″E		
61	Ludolfina	Female bebok holding a spade ace card; the card refers to the school's colloquial name "PIK", the name also being one of the names of the number pi	2024	Śródmieście; by the building of Maria Skłodowska-Curie High School (42 3 Maja Street)	50°15′34.7″N 19°00′55.5″E		
62	Ekonomik	Bebok economist, reading a book	2024	Zawodzie; by the building of the Center for Modern Technologies of the University of Economics (5 Bogucicka Street)	50°15′36.9″N 19°02′43.2″E		
63	Profesor Quatronus	Bebok as a wizard, holding a flying broom and a wand	2024	Kostuchna; on a post in front of the Quatronum tourist office (68 Tadeusz Boy-Żeleński Street)	50°11′06.7″N 18°59′45.5″E		
64	Rechtula	Female bebok as Themis, holding scales in one hand and a slingshot in the other	2024	Janów-Nikiszowiec; in front of a law firm (7a Bzów Street)	50°14′24.3″N 19°05′50.6″E		
65	Fundek	Bebok with a large globe in front of him	2024	Zawodzie; at the headquarters of the Upper Silesian Fund (Al. Rozdzieńskiego 188) Until June 2026 Śródmieście; in front of the Upper Silesian Fund headquarters (8 Sokolska Street)	50°15′41.4″N 19°00′52.8″E		
66	Aptykorz	Bebok pharmacist at a large mortar	2024	Janów-Nikiszowiec; in front of a pharmacy (1 Grodowa Street)	50°14′30.2″N 19°05′23.7″E		
67	Poli(sh)glotek	Bebok leaning on a suitcase	2024	Śródmieście; in front of the Faculty of Humanities of the University of Silesia (4 Uniwersytecka Street)	50°15′40.2″N 19°01′33.6″E		
68	Prof. Ligotek	Bebok as a doctor	2024	Ligota-Panewniki; at the entrance to the Kornel Gibiński University Clinical Center, Ligota location (14 Medyków Street)	50°13′27.0″N 18°57′16.4″E		
69	Prof. Cegiełka	Female bebok-doctor with glasses	2024	Brynów-Osiedle Zgrzebnioka; at the entrance to the University Clinical Center, Ceglana location (35 Ceglana Street)	50°14′39.8″N 19°00′56.2″E		
70	Ancug	Bebok as a student of the Silesian Technical Research Institutes	2024	Śródmieście; at the entrance to the main building of the Silesian Technical Research Institutes (26 Sokolska Street)	50°15′51.7″N 19°00′54.4″E		
71–73	Bebokowo familijo zastympczo	Foster family of beboks	2024	Koszutka; at the playground in Alojzy Budniok Park	50°16′05.1″N 19°00′55.9″E		
74	Floorek	Bebok with binoculars, in the window of a restaurant	2024	Śródmieście; inside the 27th Floor restaurant in the Altus Skyscraper (13 Uniwersytecka Street)	50°15′42.4″N 19°01′30.6″E		
75	Cinibek	Bebok on ice skates by a pile of books, holding a tablet	2024	Śródmieście; at the Scientific Information Centre and Academic Library (11a Bankowa Street)	50°15′37.1″N 19°01′48.4″E		
76	Ecik	Bebok as a lawyer	2024	Śródmieście; on the window of the District Bar Council in Katowice (17 Gliwicka Street)	50°15′40.3″N 19°00′34.6″E		
77	Bławatek	Bebok holding a jar of honey	2024	Koszutka; in front of Municipal Kindergarten No. 52 in Katowice (15a Kazimiera Iłłakowiczówna Street)	50°16′23.8″N 19°01′13.3″E		
78	Walenty	Bebok steelworker	2024	Szopienice-Burowiec; at W. Roździeński's Square	50°15′52.0″N 19°05′19.1″E		
79	Sztrōmek	Bebok energy engineer	2024	Dąb; in front of the Tauron building in Katowice (19 Widok Street)	50°16′14.0″N 19°00′53.2″E		
80–81	Ema i Oswald	Scout beboks, named after the founders of scouting in Wełnowiec, Ema Wolny and Oswald Kozioł	2024	Wełnowiec-Józefowiec; in front of the Scout House (10a T. Kotlarz Street)	50°16′44.9″N 19°00′35.3″E		
82	Rawka	Female bebok-surfer	2024	Zawodzie; at E. Breitkopf's Square	50°15′31.6″N 19°02′50.5″E		
83	Cukerzołza	Female bebok with a cake and wand	2025	Załęże; on the windowsill by the entrance to the bakery (107 Gliwicka Street)	50°15′52.4″N 18°59′57.1″E		
84	Anielik	Bebok with angel wings	2025	Śródmieście; by the gate of a tenement (15 Opolska Street)	50°15′41.4″N 19°00′48.4″E		
85	Baildonowiec	Bebok steelworker-roller at the rolling mill, so-called rolling cage with the inscription "PTTK BAILDON"	2025	Dąb; at the intersection of Żelazna Street and the road to BGH plant; area of the former Baildon Steelworks	50°15′59.9″N 19°00′28.9″E		
86	Rajzuś	Bebok tourist, in a hat with the inscription "PTTK"	2025	Śródmieście; at the Tourist Information Center (13 Rynek Street)	50°15′31.2″N 19°01′16.4″E		
87	Gwjoździorz	Bebok astronomer with telescope and astrolabe, refers to the school's patron: Nicolaus Copernicus	2025	Ligota-Panewniki; at Primary School No. 34 (3 Zielonogórska Street)	50°13′27.1″N 18°58′33.9″E		
88	Hipolit	Bebok in a wheelchair, wearing an equestrian helmet, holding a horseshoe	2025	Janów-Nikiszowiec; at the equine-assisted therapy center (3 Strumienna Street)	50°14′03.6″N 19°05′32.9″E		
89	Kokotek	Bebok filling a glass with water from a tap	2025	Szopienice-Burowiec; at the Katowice Waterworks headquarters (89 Obrońców Westerplatte Street)	50°15′54.3″N 19°04′23.9″E		
90	Zeflik	Bebok holding a fish	2025	Załęska Hałda-Brynów; intersection of Rolna and Wodospady streets, near the boundary stone between Ligota and Brynów	50°13′53.0″N 18°58′55.0″E		
91	Autoni	Bebok superhero, holding a puzzle piece	2025	Osiedle Tysiąclecia; in front of School Complex No. 3 in Katowice (4 Bolesław Chrobry Street)	50°16′46.8″N 18°58′18.1″E		
92	Wandrusik	Bebok traveler	2025	Śródmieście; at the travel agency office in a historic tenement (4 Stawowa Street)	50°15′38.6″N 19°01′05.4″E		
93–94	Szpeniol i Śpik	Two beboks symbolizing master and apprentice	2025	Koszutka; in front of the Silesian Chamber of Physicians headquarters (49a M. Grażyński Street)	50°16′08.2″N 19°01′00.3″E		
95	Belek	Bebok as a welder, with welding mask and torch, engraving his name	2025	Janów-Nikiszowiec; at the entrance to Adam Kocur Vocational School Complex (66 Szopienicka Street)	50°15′08.8″N 19°05′06.1″E		
96	Ligotka	Female bebok as a majorette	2025	Ligota-Panewniki; at the entrance to the Ligota Municipal Cultural Centre (33 Franciszkańska Street)	50°13′41.1″N 18°58′23.2″E		
97	Józa	Bebok looking into a CT scanner	2025	Brynów-Osiedle Zgrzebnioka; in front of a medical center (7 Ceglana Street)	50°14′37.92″N 19°01′22.8″E	Józa	
98	Leśniczyna	Female bebok with a watering can	2025	Murcki; in front of Juliusz Ligoń Elementary School (14 Bielska Street)	50°11′53.42″N 19°02′42.85″E	Leśniczyna	
99–100	Georg i Emil	Bebok builders commemorating Georg and Emil Zillmann	2025	Giszowiec; at the entrance to the Silesian Regional Chamber of Civil Engineers (1b Adama Street)	50°13′9.26″N 19°04′24.49″E		
101	Nomek	Bebok as a firefighter	2025	Śródmieście; 36 Plebiscytowa Street	50°15′7.19″N 19°01′12.7″E		
102	Zwusik	Bebok-railway worker operating a semaphore	2025	Wełnowiec-Józefowiec; at the entrance to Alstom ZWUS (12 Modelarska Street)	50°16′50.77″N 19°00′59.18″E		
103	Suficiorz	Bebok installing a suspended ceiling	2025	Piotrowice-Ochojec; on the roof of a suspended ceiling manufacturer (1 Barcelońska Street)	50°12′21.02″N 18°57′42.74″E	Suficiorz	
104	Imbusik	Bebok with an Allen key, a furniture assembly specialist	2025	Dąbrówka Mała; outside IKEA store	50°16′14.58″N 19°03′36.42″E		
105	Maszket	Bebok as a waiter, carrying three trays	2025	Śródmieście; at the entrance to the hotel restaurant (al. W. Roździeńskiego 16)	50°15′40.34″N 19°2′2.23″E	Bebok Maszket, ubrany z strój kelnera, niesie trzy przykryte tace. Dwie trzyma w rękach, trzecią balansuje na lewej stopie. Figurka przewiązana jest złotą kokardą	
106	Gelduś	Bebok coming out of the safe	2025	Śródmieście; at the bank branch (ul. M. Kopernika 5)	50°15′17.38″N 19°0′58.64″E	Ubrany w garnitur bebok Gelduś wychodzi z sejfu	
107	Hajnel	Bebok as a rally driver, named after Henryk Mandera	2025	Śródmieście; at the flowerbed opposite the Monopol Hotel (ul. Dworcowa 5)	50°15′27.22″N 19°1′20.72″E	Bebok Hajnel z kaskiem na głowie, siedzi w starym automobilu rajdowym, po jego lewej stronie kępy trawy rosnącej w kwietniku	
108	Geodezjusz Śląski	Bebok as a surveyor with a level, marking the 19th degree of longitude	2025	Brynów-Osiedle Zgrzebnioka; Kościuszko Park, near the pond with a fountain	50°14′40.91″N 19°0′0″E	Bebok Geogezjusz Śląski	
109	Henio	Bebok as a lover of ancient culture; he holds a compass and a map with the inscription "Kaj ida?" (Quo vadis?), named after the novel of Henryk Sienkiewicz	2025	Zawodzie; at the building of Primary School No. 31 named after H. Sienkiewicz (ul. K. Marcinkowskiego 17)	50°15′43.96″N 19°3′31.98″E	bezramki	
110	Wikipedysta	Bebok holding the Wikipedia logo; unveiled as part of the Wikimedia Polska association's 20th anniversary celebrations	2025	Śródmieście; promenade at the entrance to the building of the Faculty of Social Sciences of the University of Silesia (ul. Bankowa 11)	50°15′39.08″N 19°1′44.66″E	bezramki	
111	Biustynka	A female bebok encouraging breast examinations	2025	Śródmieście; in St. John Paul II Square	50°15′9.17″N 19°1′9.28″E	bezramki	
112	Dąbek	Bebok holding oak leaves; his name refers to the name of the district	2025	Dąb; under the mural of Lieutenant Henryk Kalemba (ul. Dębowa 3; skw. por. H. Kalemby)	50°16′18.14″N 18°59′49.27″E	bezramki	
113–114	Alena i Brad	Beboks as technical support workers; their names refer to the Allen-Bradley brand.	2025	Śródmieście; fourth floor of the office building at ul. Francuskiej 36b	50°14′59.06″N 19°1′37.09″E	bezramki	

=== Beboks by Grzegorz Chudy outside Katowice ===
Beboks outside Katowice (as of 11 May 2025)
No.	Name	Description	Year	Location	Coordinates	Image	Source
1	Kuracjuszka	Female bebok visiting the Baltic Sea	2023	Sopot; at Sopotorium (52 Bitwy pod Płowcami Street)	54°26′2.61″N 18°34′44.55″E		

=== Figurines from the Silesian Dialect Trail ===
Silesian Dialect Trail figurines (as of 11 May 2025)
Name	Description	Date	Location	Coordinates	Image	Source
Bebok	Depicts a bebok from Upper Silesian folklore	2017	Koszutka; on the stairs between Spodek and the International Congress Centre (1 Sławika i Antalla Square)	50°15′56.3″N 19°01′34.2″E		
Skarbnik	Depicts the Slavic demon Skarbnik	2017	Śródmieście; by the fountain outside the Skarbek Cooperative Shopping Centre (4 Adam Mickiewicz Street)	50°15′35.2″N 19°01′16.5″E		
Drach	Depicts a dragon	2018	Chorzów; near the entrance to Legendia (1 Atrakcji Square)	50°16′23.0″N 18°59′28.5″E		

== History ==
=== Silesian Dialect Trail ===
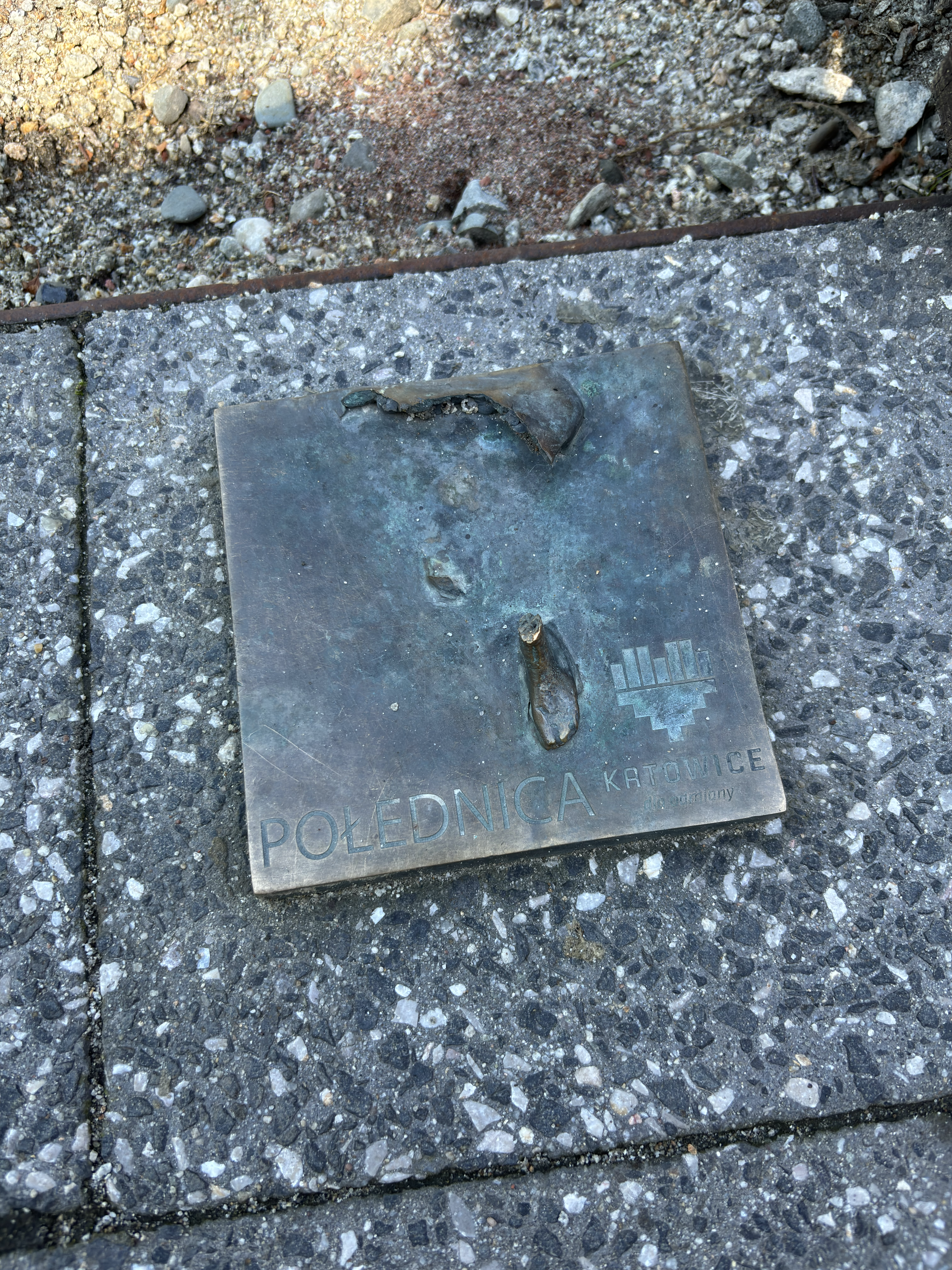
Remains of the Połednica figurine from the Silesian Dialect Trail, located near the Headquarters of the Polish National Radio Symphony Orchestra (2024)

The first small outdoor sculptures in the public space of Katowice were created as part of the Silesian Dialect Trail. They were intended to consist of small figurines placed in the city center (similar to the Wrocław Dwarfs), symbolizing words or figures from Upper Silesian tradition. The trail aimed to encourage people to explore local traditions and culture, with publicly available maps to aid in finding the figurines. The project was a collaboration between individuals involved in the Ogrody Przedsiębiorczości event and the Katowice City Hall. The trail included the following figures: Skarbnik, Utopek, Heksa (witch), Połednica, Bebok, Strziga, Geld (representing Karl Godulla), Maszkieciorz (a figure fond of sweets), and Drach (dragon).

The Silesian Dialect Trail was inaugurated during Katowice's 152nd birthday on 7 September 2017 at the Ateneum Theatre. It operated for only one day – on 8 September, most figurines were found to have been vandalized, either destroyed or stolen, necessitating the trail's closure by removing the surviving figurines. Initially, the city planned to revive the trail by replacing the old figurines with new ones made from vandalism-resistant materials.

On 26 April 2018, the Geld figurine was stolen, having survived on the trail for only two days. In June, police recovered the Połednica figurine, stolen at the end of May from Sławika i Antalla Square. On 31 August, another figurine, Drach, depicting a dragon, was unveiled on the trail. It was placed in Chorzów, in front of Legendia.

In September 2018, due to ongoing vandalism and thefts (only four of the nine figurines remained – Drach, Skarbnik, Heksa, and Bebok), it was decided that the figurines would not return to the trail in their original form. A new concept emerged to transform the trail – replacing physical figurines with digital versions via markers placed at the original locations. These figures would appear on phone screens after downloading a special app and scanning the marker's code.

=== Beboks by Grzegorz Chudy ===
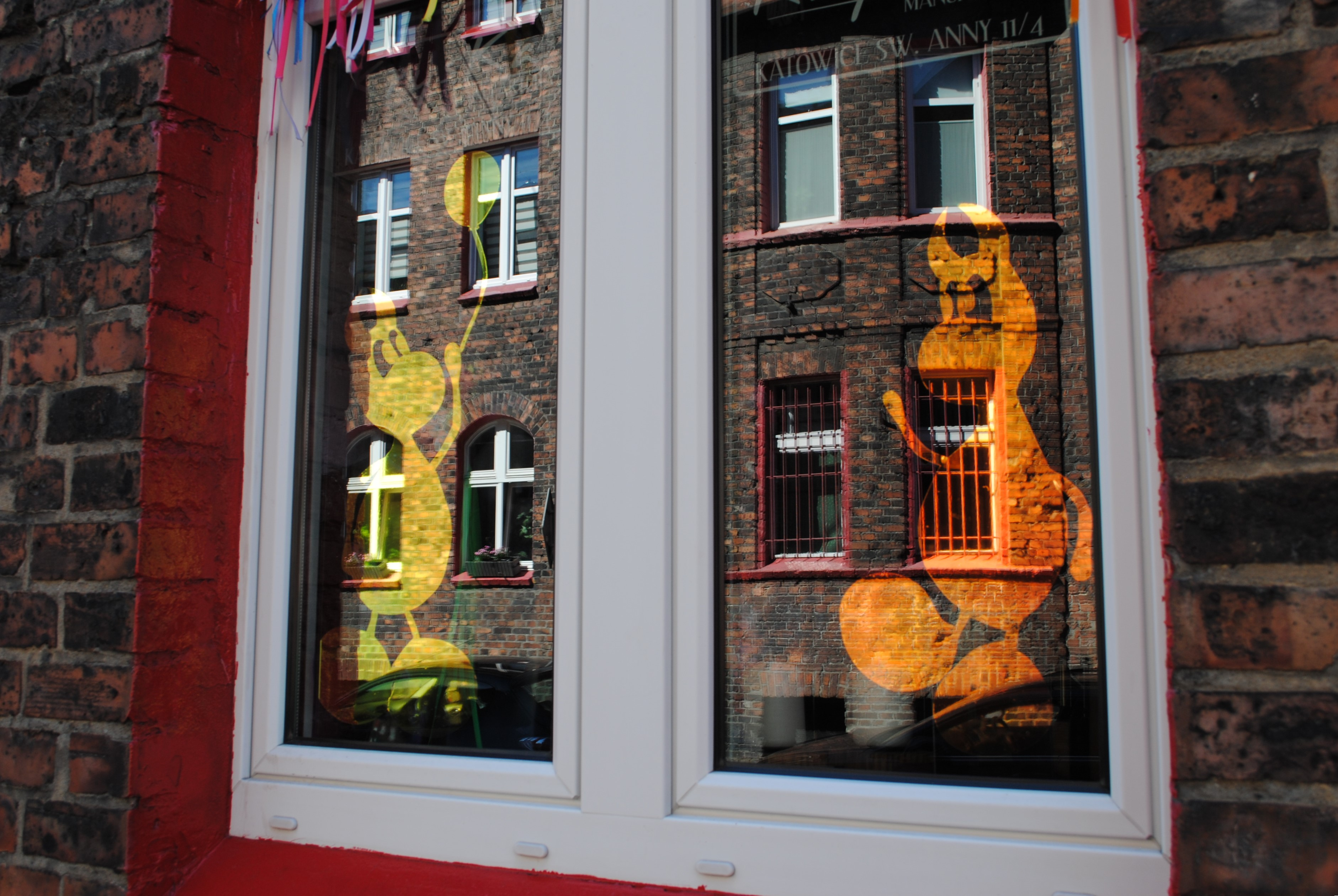
Templates depicting beboks on the window of an art studio on St. Anna Street in Katowice (2024)

The idea for figurines depicting beboks originated with Katowice artist Grzegorz Chudy in 2018. Initially, it was a drawing for a child, after which he began painting watercolors of legendary creatures. His first book about beboks, published in 2019, described their life in Nikiszowiec.

Later, the idea emerged to create figurines to decorate Nikiszowiec. Dariusz Kik and Karolina Piechota visited Chudy's atelier, stating they could cast a bebok figurine in bronze and place it. The first was temporarily placed in Nikiszowiec in January 2021. The first permanent figurines, Michalino and Wincynt, were installed in the historic district in July of the same year.

On 29 September 2021, the first beboks outside Nikiszowiec were unveiled. Two new figurines, Frelka and Miglanc, were revealed in front of Galeria Katowicka. Their names were chosen through an online contest from many proposals by Katowice residents. A ceremony celebrated their installation, attended by Galeria Katowicka director Joanna Bagińska, artist Grzegorz Chudy, and Katowice mayor Marcin Krupa.

On 1 June 2022, a bebok named Bebook was unveiled. It resulted from the "Let's Make a Bebok" campaign, organized at the request of students from Social Primary School No. 1 of the Civic Educational Society in Katowice. After visiting Chudy's atelier, they wanted to place their own bebok in front of the school building.

On 29 September 2022, Bebok Day was celebrated at Galeria Katowicka. A figurine named Bōncloka was unveiled, with its name chosen by Katowice residents, similar to the figurines at the gallery's entrance. On the same day, the play Beboki by Teatr Trip premiered at the Korez Theatre. The proposal came from Grzegorz Chudy, inspired by his watercolors.

On 19 October 2022, the bebok Bogucia was unveiled at Porcelana Śląska factory, tied to the Giesche Foundation's anniversary. Its name was chosen via an online contest. On 4 December of the same year, a bebok miner named Ferdynand was placed in Bogucice Park, heading to a shift at the Ferdynand mine (later Katowice mine). Its funding involved Bogucice residents purchasing decorative magnets designed for the occasion and participating in an online auction for a bebok watercolor. A festival, "Barbórka with Bebok", and a special run were organized to mark the unveiling. At the end of 2022, Katowice beboks appeared in the music video for the song Co to jest za dźwiynk, inviting people to discover them.

In mid-January 2023, a bebok holding a heart-shaped logo of Katowice was unveiled at the Market Square. On 30 May 2023, a female bebok named Kasia was unveiled in front of the entrance of the Adam Mickiewicz High School. In June 2023, a bebok named Ewald was placed in Giszowiec in front of the Giszowiec branch of the Szopienice-Giszowiec Municipal Cultural Center, commemorating Ewald Gawlik. It was unveiled during the Giszowiec Children's Day celebrations. Later that month, the Medical University of Silesia gained its own bebok, placed in front of the Main Library at Warszawska Street. It was unveiled by the university's rector, Prof. Tomasz Szczepański.

In August 2023, the first bebok outside Katowice was unveiled in Sopot at Sopotorium, named Kuracjuszka.

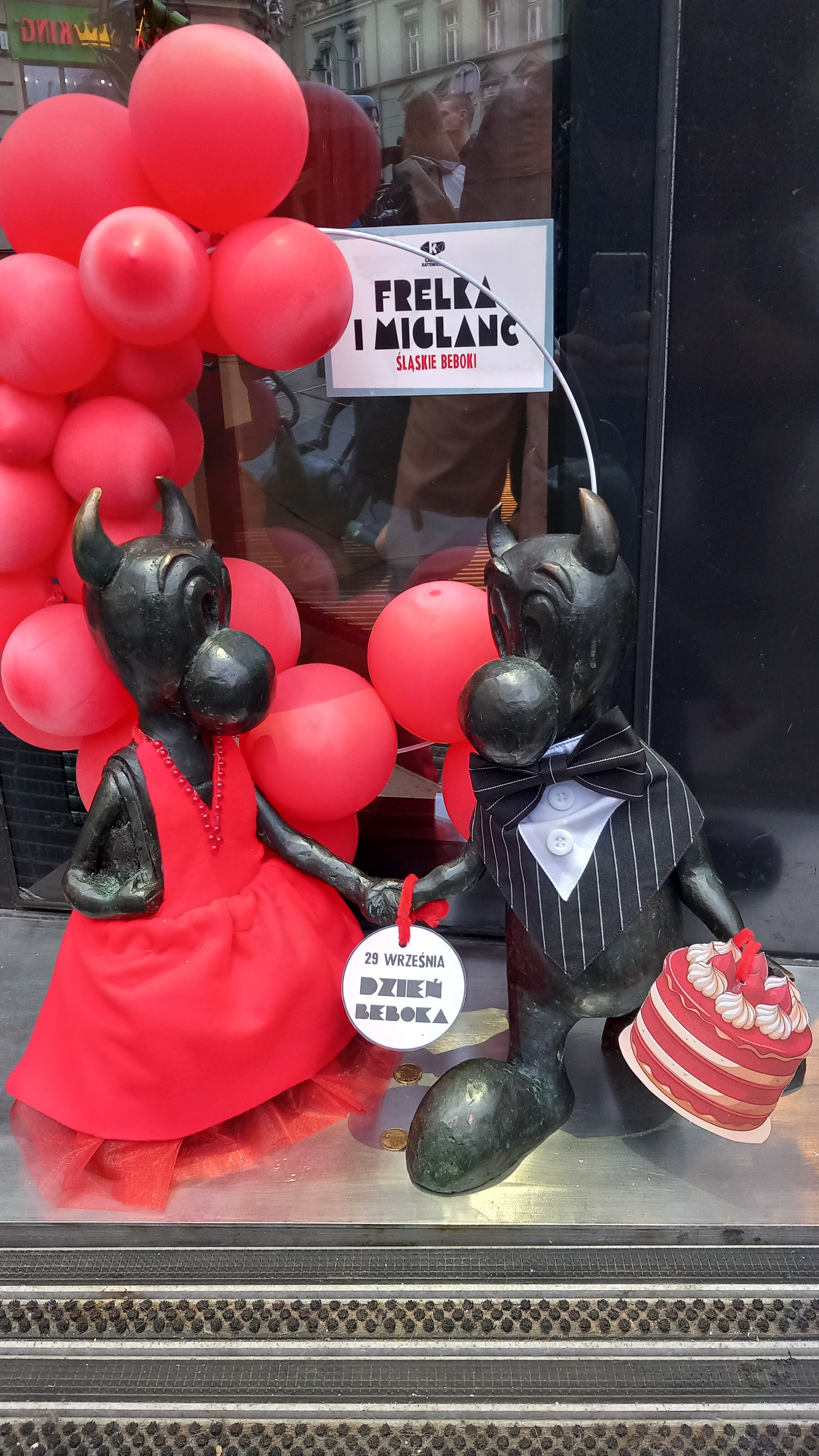
Bebok figurines Frelka and Miglanc decorated for Bebok Day 2024

On 11 September 2023, a square with stairs was ceremonially opened at the KTW office complex, where a new Katowice bebok, Katewusia, was unveiled. On 2 October of the same year, another Nikiszowiec bebok – two figurines, Sztefa and Erwinek – was placed at the entrance to the Department of Urban Ethnology of the Katowice Historical Museum at 4 Rymarska Street. Erwinek refers to Erwin Sówka, a naïve art painter from the Janów Group, while Sztefa commemorates a Nikiszowiec resident who used the local mangle. In early November 2023, a female bebok named Harmonia was placed in front of the Krzysztof Czuma Psychiatry Center in Katowice, intended to remind people of the importance of mental balance. The figurine was initiated by psychologist Joanna Czuma-Sitek. On 4 December 2023, during the 96th anniversary of Katowice Polish Radio, a bebok named Antenek was unveiled in front of the Radio Katowice headquarters in the presence of Silesian Voivodeship marshal Jakub Chełstowski and Katowice mayor Marcin Krupa.

On 13 March 2024, a bebok named Konopiusz was unveiled at the Maria Konopnicka High School with the participation of mayor Marcin Krupa and artist Grzegorz Chudy, a graduate of the school. A few days later, on 22 March, a ceremony unveiled the bebok Akademikus in front of the main entrance to the Katowice Business University.

On 25 April 2024, during a parliamentary debate on recognizing the Silesian ethnolect as a regional language, MP Ewa Kołodziej from Civic Coalition appeared at the podium with bebok mascots Trudka and Alojz. She noted, among other things, that "they used to scare children, but now they are charming creatures, characters from fairy tales".

On 9 May 2024, a female bebok named Doradziejka was ceremonially unveiled in Koszutka at Grunwald Square. It was funded by the Silesian Branch of the National Chamber of Tax Advisors. On 31 May of the same year, the first bebok in Osiedle Tysiąclecia, named Tauzenik, was unveiled at the square by 8 Zawisza Czarny Street. During the Rector's Family Day celebrations by the University of Economics in Katowice on 20 June 2024, a bebok was unveiled in front of the Center for Modern Information Technologies building. The Kornel Gibiński University Clinical Centre, during the 50th anniversary of the Kornel Gibiński Central Clinical Hospital on 10 September 2024, unveiled two bebok-doctor figurines at the entrances to the facilities at 35 Ceglana Street and 14 Medyków Street. A large-scale mural was also created.

In 2024, Bebok Day (29 September), previously celebrated only at Galeria Katowicka, took on a city-wide character – many institutions and businesses overseeing bebok figurines offered attractions or special promotions, some requiring a bebok hunter's badge. In October 2024, as part of the "Check Your Breasts with Beboks" campaign by the Oko w Oko z Rakiem Foundation, some beboks were dressed in pink scarves. The first to receive a scarf was Florka.

In early January 2025, the first bebok in the Załęże district, a female bebok named Cukerzołza, was placed in front of the confectionery at 107 Gliwicka Street. On 8 April 2025, at the IKEA store in Katowice, in interiors inspired by Katowice's Nikiszowiec, an exhibition of Grzegorz Chudy's watercolors and photographs featuring beboks, including Ema i Oswald, Harmonia, and Zeflik, was displayed. On 17 May, a temporary exhibition of dozens of Marek Foltyn's photographs showcasing beboks from various parts of Katowice was held at the Department of Urban Ethnology of the Katowice Historical Museum.

On 31 May 2025 at 10:30 AM, the female bebok Leśniczyna was unveiled, and at 12:00 PM, the figurines Georg and Emil were unveiled, bringing the number of beboks in Katowice to 100.

== See also ==
- Wrocław Dwarfs
