= Silesian Insurgents' Monument in Kostuchna =

War memorial in Katowice

- Polish: Pomnik Powstańców Śląskich w Kostuchnie
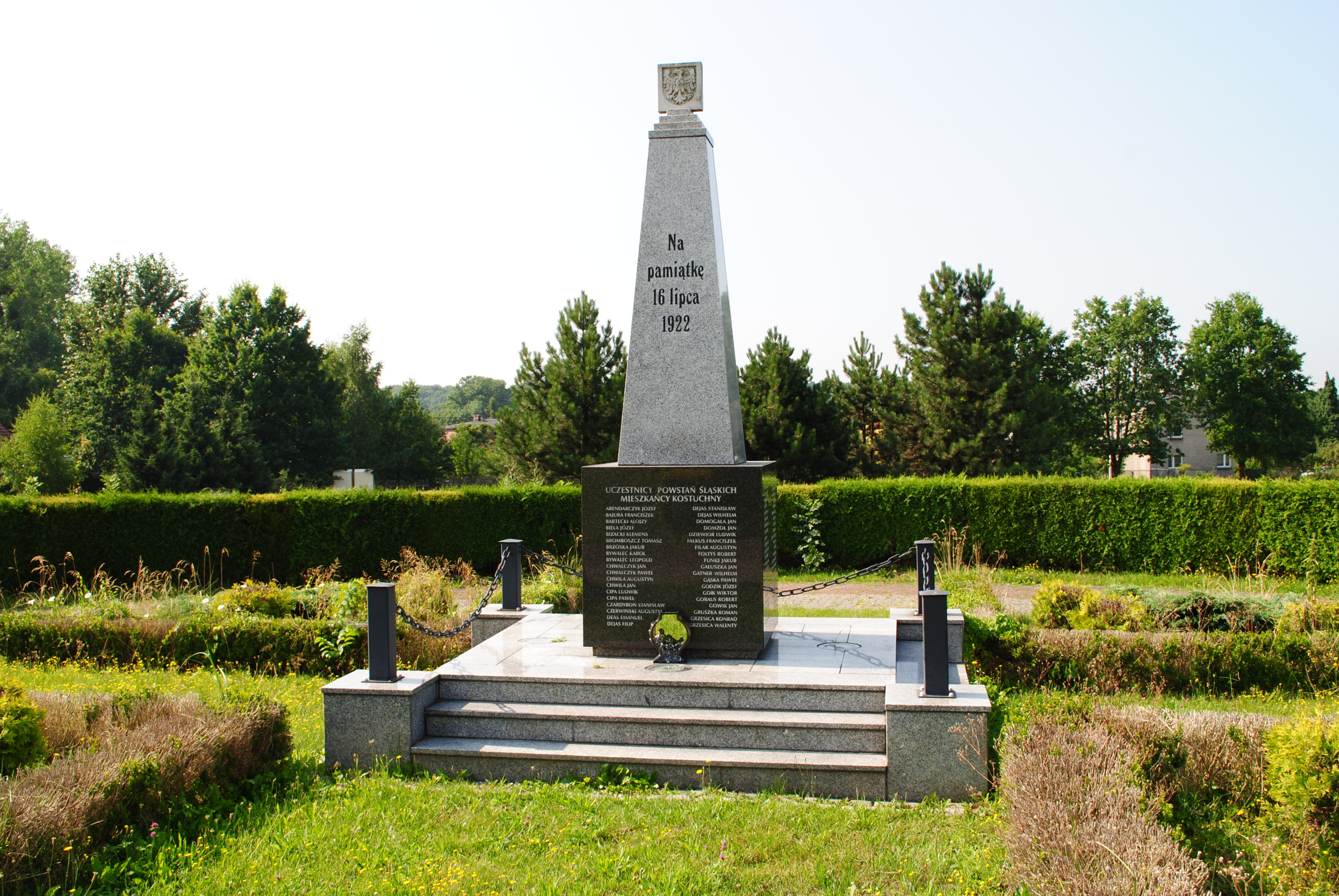
- Monument to the Silesian Insurgents from Kostuchna, 2021.
- Interactive map of Silesian Insurgents' Monument in Kostuchna
- Location: Katowice (Kostuchna), Poland
- Coordinates: 50°11′16″N 18°59′27″E
- Type: Obelisk
- Completion date: 1922
- Restored date: 17 November 2002
- Dedicated to: Silesian Uprisings
- Dismantled date: 1939

The Silesian Insurgents' Monument in Kostuchna (Polish: Pomnik Powstańców Śląskich w Kostuchnie) is a monument in the southern part of Katowice, located in the Kostuchna district, on Blessed Stanisław Kubista Square, near the Church of the Most Holy Trinity.

== History ==
The first monument, dedicated to the Silesian insurgents from Kostuchna, was erected in 1922. It was destroyed by the Germans in 1939 during the Second World War. The current monument was unveiled on November 17, 2002, on the 80th anniversary of the incorporation of Upper Silesia into Poland. The shape of the monument and the inscription are faithful to the original. Additionally, the names of 93 Silesian insurgents from Kostuchna were inscribed on the monument. Mieczysław Zwoliński, former principal of Primary School No. 53 in Kostuchna, initiated the creation of the current replica. The project was designed by Karolina Możejko-Rogowska, Andrzej Szofer, and Bernard Uszok. The obelisk was erected by the stonemasonry workshop of Irena Mateja.

The monument was unveiled by Piotr Uszok, Mayor of Katowice, alongside Bernard Uszok and Jerzy Śmiałek (members of the Upper Silesian Union). The monument was blessed by Bishop Gerard Bernacki.

The monument bears the inscription:

Inscription (Polish)

Na
pamiątkę
16 lipca
1922

Translation (English)

In
memory of
16 July
1922

== Gallery ==
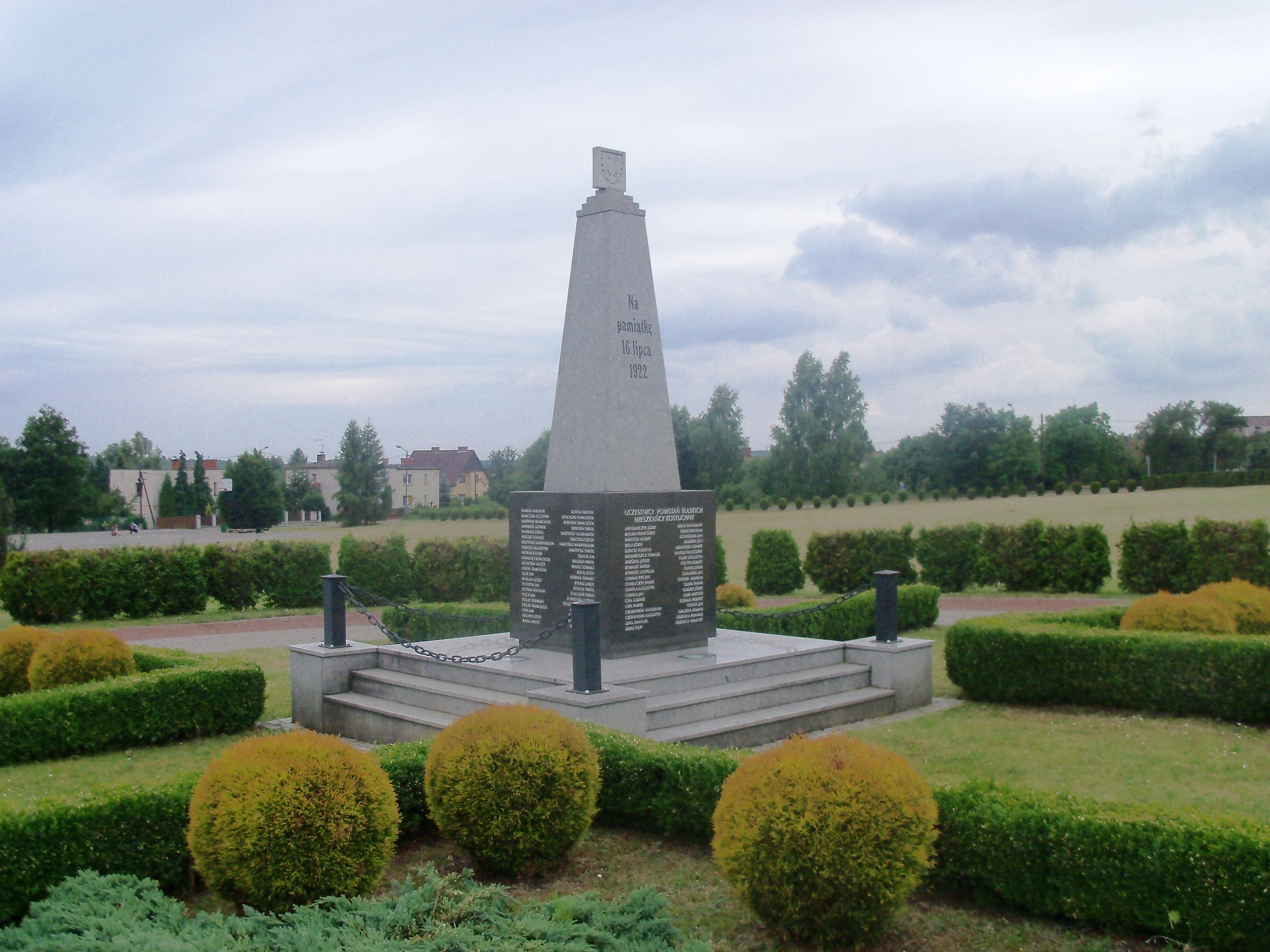
The monument in 2011

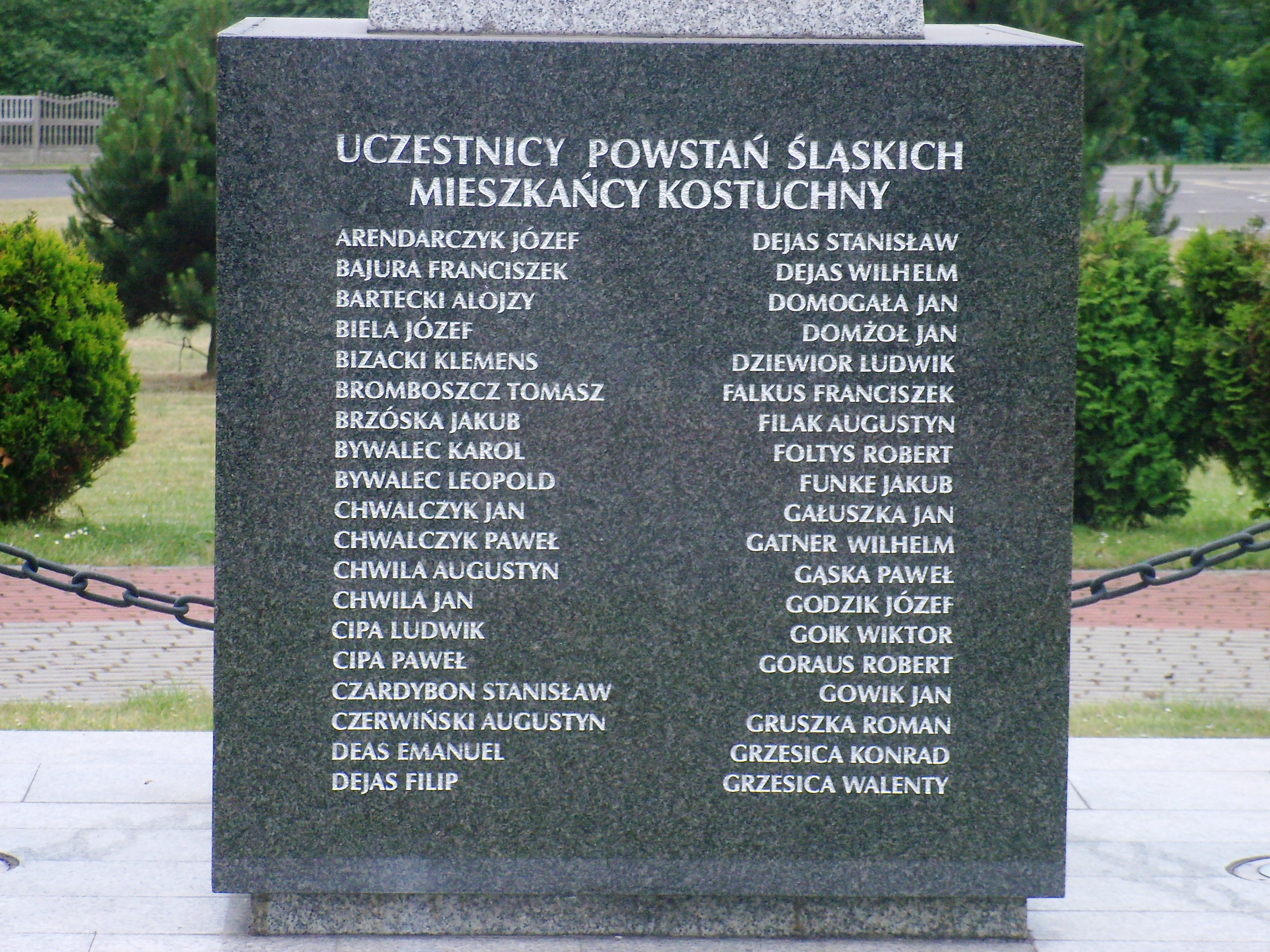
Names of insurgents seen on the front

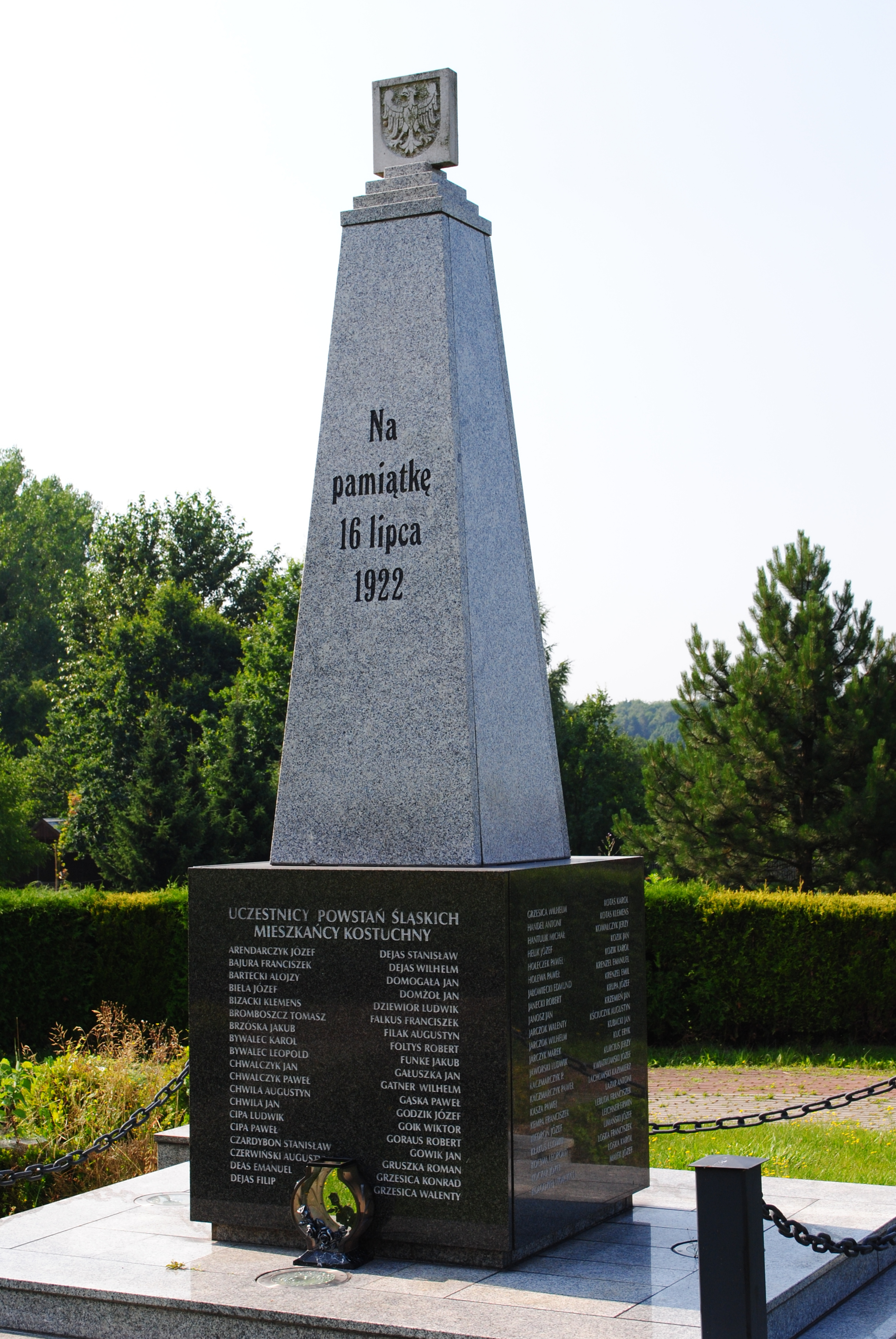
Close-up of the obelisk
