= Henryk Dziewior =

Polish politician (1948–2022)

Mayor of Katowice
- In office 1 July 1994 – 3 November 1998
- Preceded by: Jerzy Śmiałek
- Succeeded by: Piotr Uszok

Personal details
- Born: Henryk Paweł Dziewior; 1948
- Died: 7 August 2022 (aged 74)
- Party: Katowickiego Porozumienia Samorządowego
- Occupation: Entrepreneur

Henryk Paweł Dziewior (1948 – 7 August 2022) was a Polish entrepreneur and politician. He served as mayor of Katowice from 1994 to 1998.

Dziewior died on 7 August 2022, at the age of 74.
