= Katowice City Council =

Local government body in Katowice, Poland

City Council of Katowice Rada Miejska Katowice

Type
- Type: Unicameral

Leadership
- Chairman: Łukasz Borkowski, KO
- Vice-Chairmen: Tomasz Maśnica, KO; Krzysztof Pieczyński, FSiMK; Piotr Trząski, PiS

Structure
- Seats: 28
- Political groups: Mayoral coalition (28): Civic Coalition (14); Local Government Forum and Marcin Krupa (9); Law and Justice (4); Independent (1)

Elections
- Voting system: Multi-member electoral districts with five-year terms
- Last election: 7 April 2024
- Next election: 2029

Website
- www.katowice.eu/dla-mieszka%C5%84ca/w%C5%82adze-miasta/rada-miasta

The Katowice City Council is the governing body of Katowice. The council has 28 elected members elected every five years in an election by city voters through a secret ballot. The election of City Council and the local head of government, which takes place at the same time, is based on legislation introduced on 20 June 2002.

== Members of the Katowice City Council ==
Party	District 1	District 2	District 3	District 4	District 5
Civic Coalition	Tomasz Maśnica; Beata Bala; Adam Lejman-Gąska; Magdalena Skwarek; Andrzej Warmuz	Jarosław Makowski; Urszula Machowska	Łukasz Borkowski; Ewa Sadkowska; Elżbieta Grodzka-Łopuszyńska	Magdalena Wieczorek; Patryk Białas	Barbara Wnęk-Gabor; Adam Szymczyk
Local Government Forum and Marcin Krupa	Marcin Krupa; Krzysztof Pieczyński	Maria Ryś; Barbara Mańdok	Adam Skowron	Krzysztof Kraus; Borys Pronobis	Maciej Biskupski; Damian Stępień
Law and Justice	Mariusz Skiba	Piotr Trząski	Piotr Pietrasz	Leszek Piechota	Krystyna Panek

== Election results ==
=== 2024 ===
All 28 seats on the city council were being contested in the 2024 election.

Party	Votes	%	Seats
Civic Coalition (Note: Including New Left.)	38,475	39.23	14
Local Government Forum and Marcin Krupa	29,472	30.05	9
Law and Justice	18,243	18.60	5
Katowice2050	5,422	5.53	0
Confederation and Nonpartisan Localists	5,145	5.25	0
Gaia System – The Youth for the Future Now	1,319	1.34	0
Total	98,076	100.00	28
