= Zarzecze, Katowice =

Zarzecze
- Katowice District
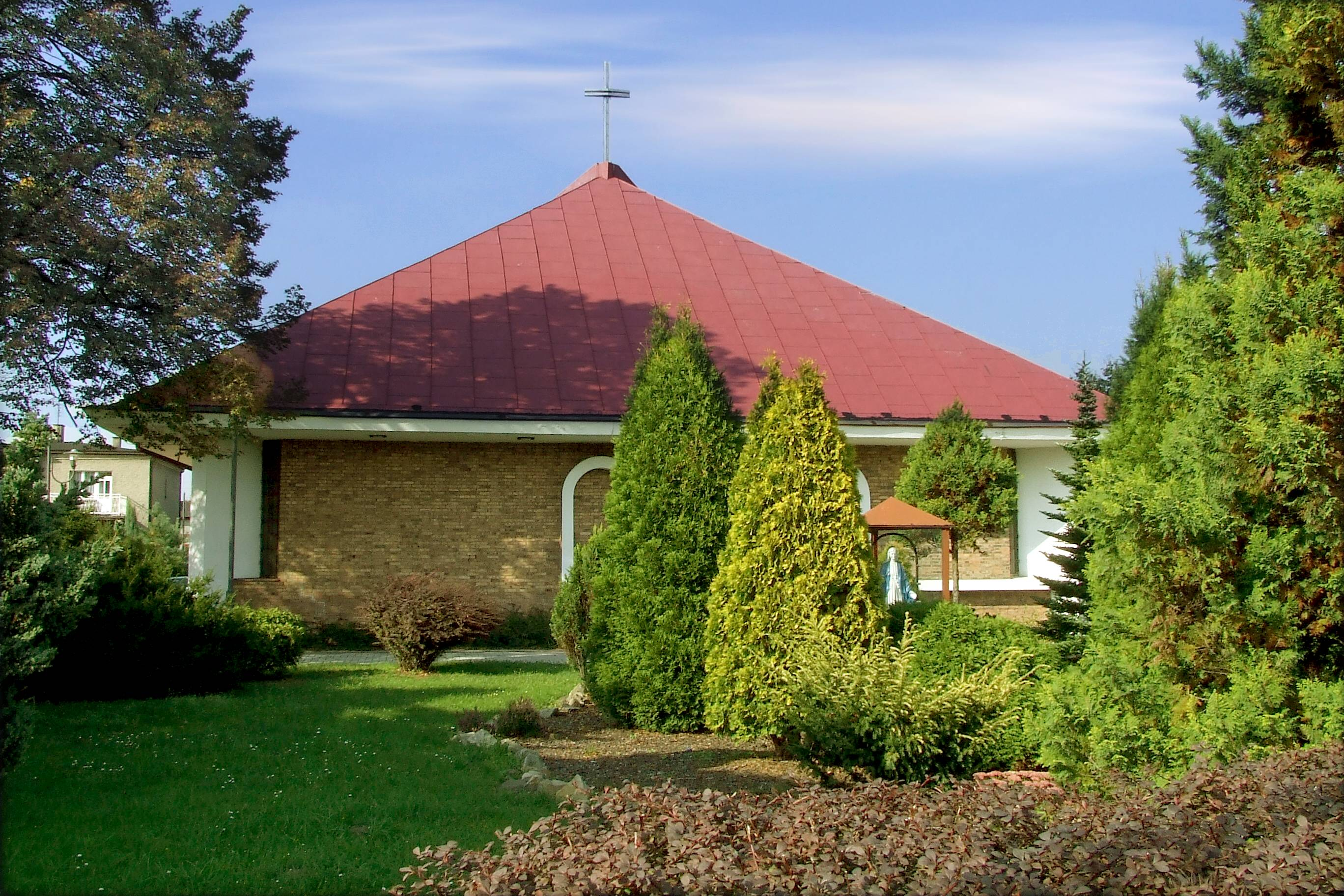
- Church in Zarzecze

- Location of Zarzecze within Katowice
- Coordinates: 50°12′33.2″N 18°58′50.9″E
- Country: Poland
- Voivodeship: Silesian
- County/City: Katowice

Area
  - Total: 5.1 km^{2} (2.0 sq mi)

Population (2007)
  - Total: 1,902
  - Density: 370/km^{2} (970/sq mi)
- Time zone: UTC+1 (CET)
  - Summer (DST): UTC+2 (CEST)
- Area code: (+48) 032

Zarzecze (German: Zarzetsche) is a district of Katowice in southern Poland. It has an area of 5.1 km^{2} and in 2007 had 1,902 inhabitants.

The literal meaning of the name is a land behind a river.

== History ==
The oldest settlement in the area of what are now the districts Piotrowice, Podlesie and Zarzecze was Uniczowy, a village that existed already in the 12th century. In the 15th century Uniczowy began to crumble into three distinct parts. Zarzecze became independent somewhat in the 16th century.

During the political upheaval caused by Matthias Corvinus the land around Pszczyna was overtaken by Casimir II, Duke of Cieszyn, who sold it in 1517 to the Hungarian magnates of the Thurzó family, forming the Pless state country. In the accompanying sales document issued on 21 February 1517 the village was mentioned as Zarzeczie. The Kingdom of Bohemia in 1526 became part of the Habsburg monarchy. In the War of the Austrian Succession most of Silesia was conquered by the Kingdom of Prussia, including the village.
