= Babay (Slavic folklore) =

Slavic folklore character

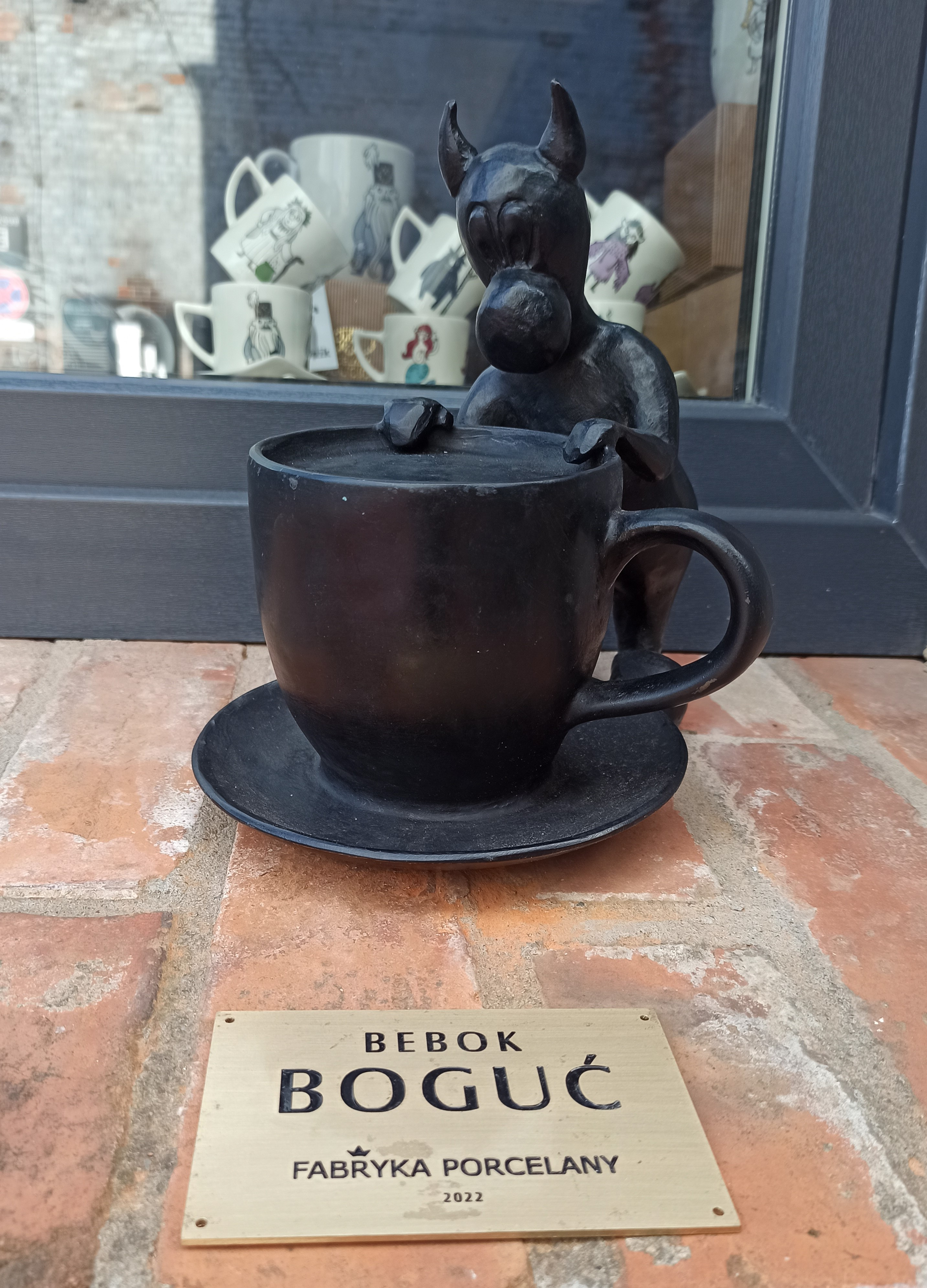
A modern depiction of a Silesian bebok in Katowice, Poland

Babay or Babai is a night spirit (Bogeyman) in Slavic folklore. According to beliefs, he abducts children who do not sleep at night or behave badly. He is also called Babayko (Ukrainian: Бабайко), Babayka (Russian: Бабайка) or Bobo (Babok, Bebok) (Polish), although the term may also be applied to his female equivalent.

== Role and characteristics ==
Babay is rarely described, so that children can imagine him in the form most terrible for them, but sometimes Babay is described as a pitch-black and crooked old man. He has some physical defects, such as muteness, armlessness, and/or lameness. He has a bag and a cane. It is believed that he lives in the forest, in a swamp or in a garden. At night, he wanders through the streets and puts into his bag those who meet him on the way. Walking near houses, Babay stands close to the windows and watches the children. If they are awake or not sleeping, he starts to make scary noises, such as rustling, gritting and knocking on the window. Also, Babay can sometimes hide under the child's bed, and he may take them if they're awake or get up.

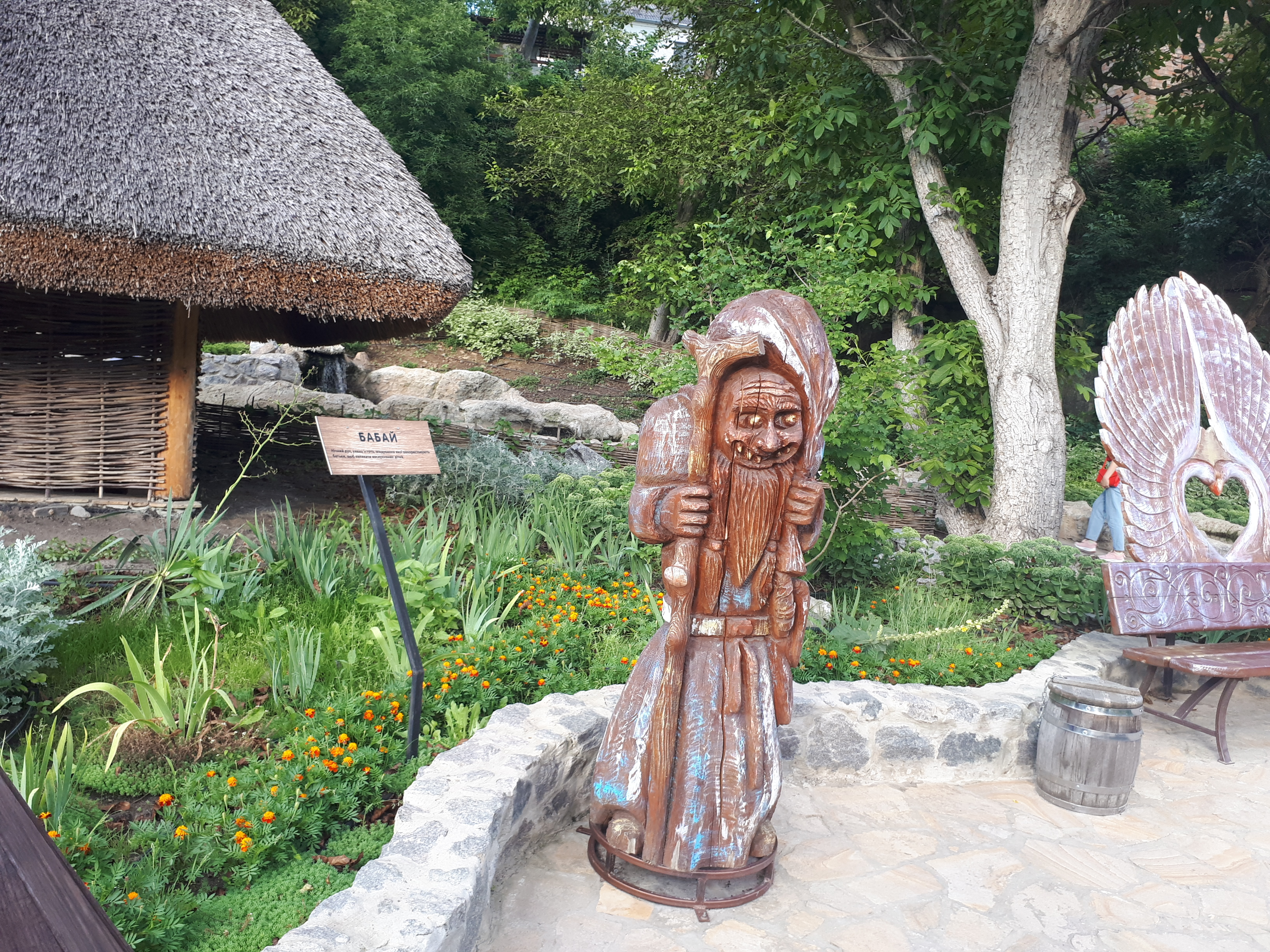
A depiction

Babay is often mentioned in lullabies, usually with instructions not to come for the child:

Ходить Бабай по болоту,
Носить хату на плоту.
А ти, дитя, не гуляй,
Бо прийде по тебе Бабай!
Прийде Бабай під вікно:
— Чи спить дитя вже давно?
Як не спить — то заберу,
На болото віднесу!

Translation:

The Babai comes slogging through muck and through bog,
Poling his shack on a raft made of logs.
So don’t you go wandering—stay in your bed,
Or the Babai will come for you, sleepyhead!
He’ll creep to the window and peek through the pane:
“Is the little one sleeping, or waking again?
If you’re still awake, then I’ll scoop you right up
And carry you off to my mud-dripping hut!”

== Etymology ==
The term babay, alongside its synonym, baba, is most likely of Turkic origin. It is translated as "grandfather", "old man" from the Tatar language.

== In popular culture ==
- Babay / Бабай (Babai) is a 2014 children's animated film created by Ukraine's Ukranimafilm.
- Ukraine's Ukranimafilm animated series was released in 2015.
- Zhikharka / Жихарка is a 2006 Russian animated short film.
- Babayka is a song by Russian deathcore band Slaughter to Prevail on their 2025 album GRIZZLY.

== See also ==
- Domovoy
- Katowice beboks
