= Marcin Krupa =

Polish politician (born 1976)

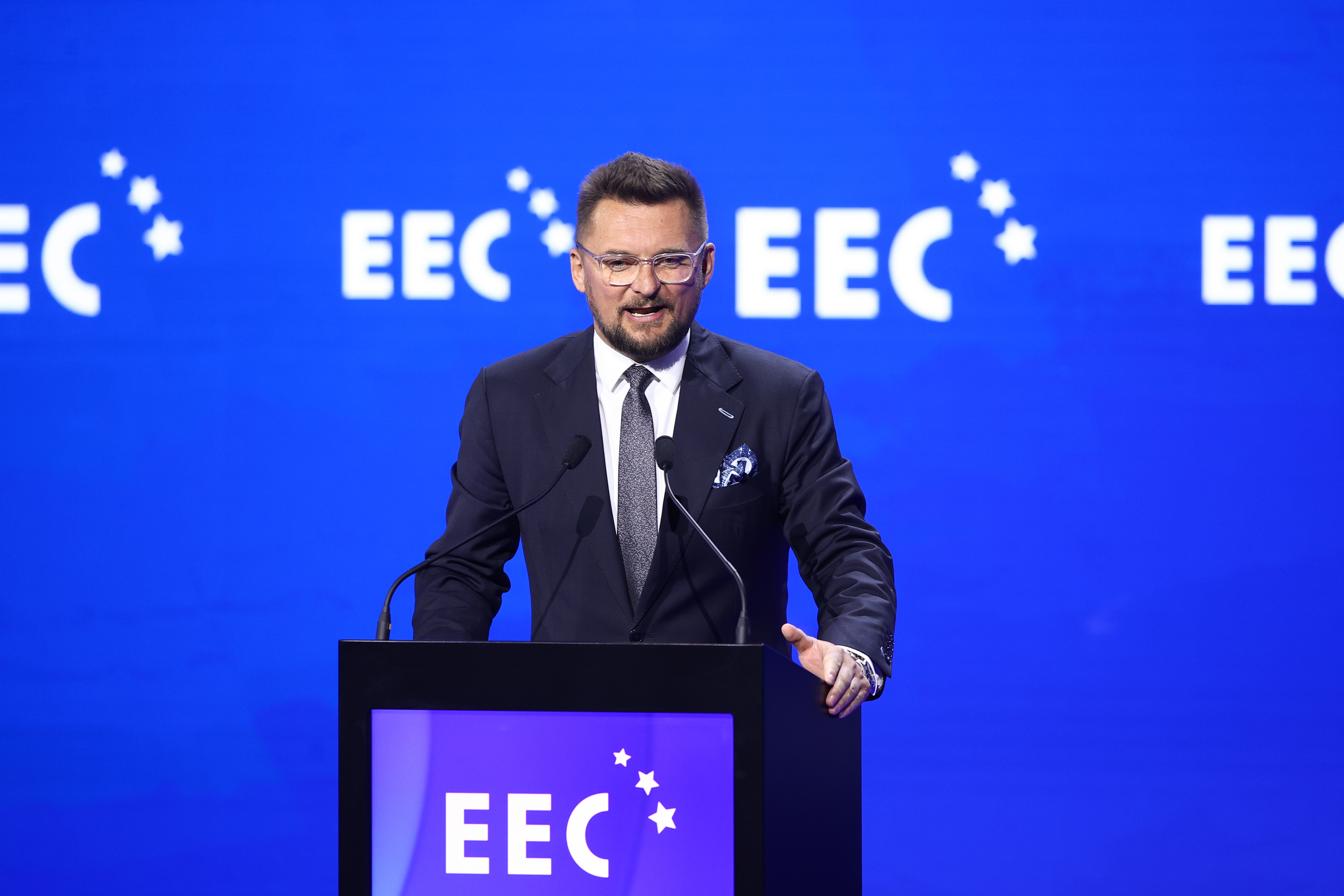
- Krupa in 2025

Mayor of Katowice
- Incumbent
- Assumed office 8 December 2014
- Preceded by: Piotr Uszok

Personal details
- Born: 1976 (age 49–50) Katowice, Polish People's Republic
- Education: Silesian University of Technology

Marcin Krupa (born 1976) is a Polish politician serving as mayor of Katowice since 2014. He has served as chairman of the assembly of the Metropolis GZM since 2024, having previously served from 2017 to 2018.
