= Piotrowice-Ochojec =

- Katowice District
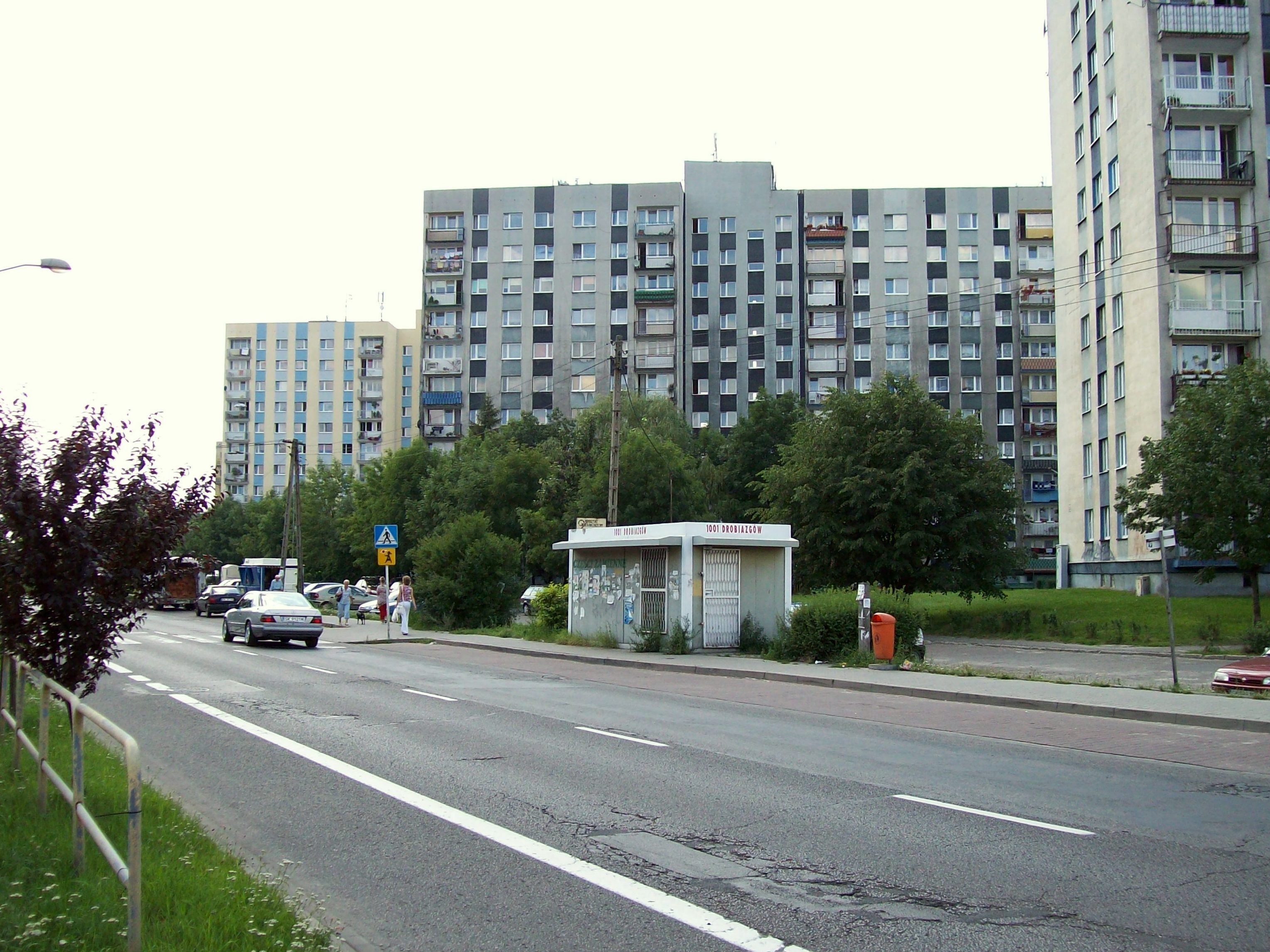
- Targowisko housing estate

- Location of Piotrowice-Ochojec within Katowice
- Coordinates: 50°12′33.2″N 18°58′50.9″E
- Country: Poland
- Voivodeship: Silesian
- County/City: Katowice

Area
  - Total: 1,208 km^{2} (466 sq mi)

Population (2007)
  - Total: 25,110
  - Density: 20.79/km^{2} (53.84/sq mi)
- Time zone: UTC+1 (CET)
  - Summer (DST): UTC+2 (CEST)
- Area code: (+48) 032

Piotrowice-Ochojec is a district of Katowice, Poland. It has an area of 12,08 km^{2} and in 2007 had 25,110 inhabitants.

== History ==
The area became part of the emerging Polish state in the 10th century. Following the fragmentation of Poland, it formed part of various smaller duchies, including the duchies of Silesia and Opole, later falling under Bohemian suzerainty.

=== Piotrowice ===
The oldest settlement in the area of what are now the districts Piotrowice, Podlesie and Zarzecze was Uniczowy, a village that existed in the 12th century and was first mentioned in the year 1287.

During the political upheaval caused by Matthias Corvinus, the land around Pszczyna was overtaken by Casimir II, Duke of Cieszyn, who sold it in 1517 to the Hungarian magnates of the Thurzó family, forming the Pless state country. In the accompanying sales document issued on 21 February 1517 the village was mentioned as Petrowicze Vnicziowy. The Kingdom of Bohemia in 1526 became part of the Habsburg monarchy. In the War of the Austrian Succession most of Silesia was conquered by the Kingdom of Prussia, including the village.

Uniczowy was somewhat replaced by Piotrowice in the 17th century. It was merged with Katowice in 1939.

During the German occupation of Poland (World War II), on January 18, 1940, the German police carried out a massacre of 39 Polish farmers, craftsmen and workers in Piotrowice (see Nazi crimes against the Polish nation).

=== Ochojec ===
The area of Ochojec was covered with forests until the middle of the 17th century. Around 1650 a folwark was established here by Promnitz family, the owners of Pless (Pszczyna). The small settlement emerged in 1770. The meaningful growth of Ochojec began after World War I.
