= Galeria Katowicka =

Shopping center in Katowice, Poland

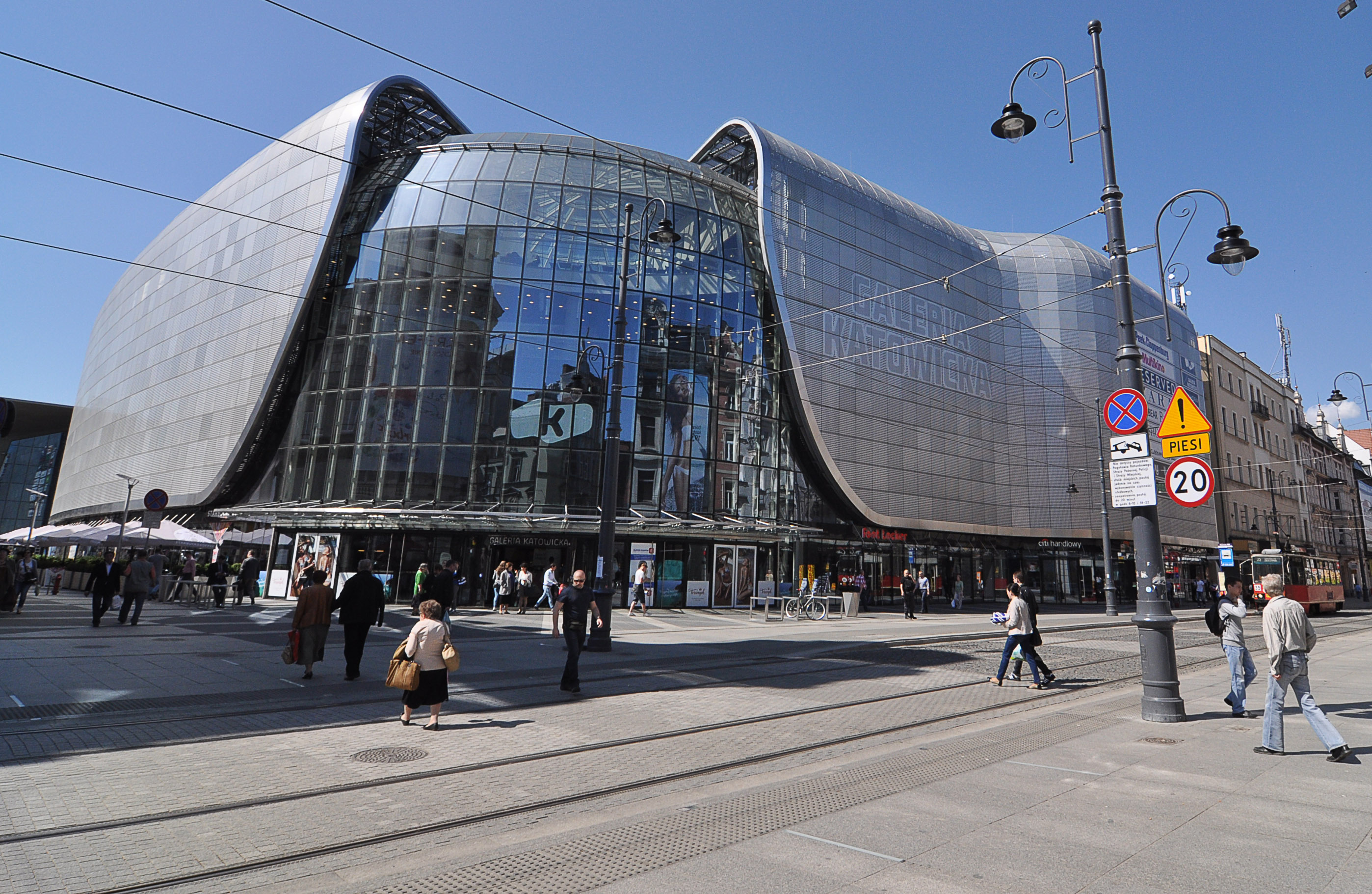
- The main entrance to the mall from 3 Maja Street
- Location: Katowice, Poland
- Coordinates: 50°15′32″N 19°01′02″E
- Address: 3 Maja 30, 40-097 Katowice
- Opened: September 18, 2013; 13 years ago
- Developer: Neinver
- Owner: Employees Provident Fund (Malaysia)
- Floor area: 52,000 square metres (560,000 ft^{2})
- Floors: 7

Galeria Katowicka is a shopping mall in Katowice, Poland. The mall was built in parallel with the modernization of the Katowice railway station and the city bus station, it forms one complex with them.

== Description ==
The gallery with a usable area of 52,000 m² includes nearly 250 shops and service points, a multiplex cinema and an underground car park with 1,200 parking spaces. There is a bicycle rack in front of the gallery. The gallery has seven floors: parking levels -3 and -2, and retail and service levels from -1 to +3.

== History ==
In 2007, PKP decided to modernize the railway station in Katowice and its immediate vicinity. The investment included the construction of a railway station, an underground bus station, Galeria Katowicka, an office building and the reconstruction of road infrastructure as well as the reorganization and tidying up of the urban space in the vicinity of the station. The competition for the implementation of the entire investment was won by the Spanish company Neinver. On 31 May 2011, the cornerstone for the construction of the new station and mall was laid. The general contractor of the investment was Strabag Sp. z o.o. The gallery opened on September 18, 2013 at 10 a.m. The first owners of the gallery were Neinvera (the company that built the facility) and the Polish State Railways company. Around 2010, Meyer Bergman European Retail Partners bought half of the shares in the gallery, and later bought the rest. Meyer sold the gallery to the Employees Provident Fund of Malaysia pension fund in March 2018.
