= List of city mayors of Katowice =

This is a list of mayors of Katowice, Poland.

- 1866–1871: Louis Diebel
- 1871–1873: Oswald Kerner
- 1874–1889: Otto Rüppel
- 1890–1903: August Schneider
- 1903–1920: Alexander Pohlmann
- 1922–1928: Alfons Górnik
- 1928–1939: Adam Kocur
- 1939–1945: Artur Stegner
- 29 September 1945: Jan Wesolowski
- 1945–1946: Zenon Tomaszewski
- 1946–1950: Aleksander Willner
- 1950–1952: Stefan Kruzel
- 1952–1953: Ewald Lison
- 1953–1971: Antoni Wojda
- 1971–1975: Pawel Podbial
- 1975–1978: Lucjan Gajda
- 1978–1981: Marian Wysocki
- 1981–1984: Edward Mecha
- 1984–1989: Jerzy Swierad
- 1989–1990: Krystyna Nesteruk
- 1990–1994: Jerzy Smialek
- 1994–1998: Henryk Dziewior
- 1998–2014: Piotr Uszok
- 2014–current Marcin Krupa
