= Piotr Uszok =

Polish politician (born 1955)

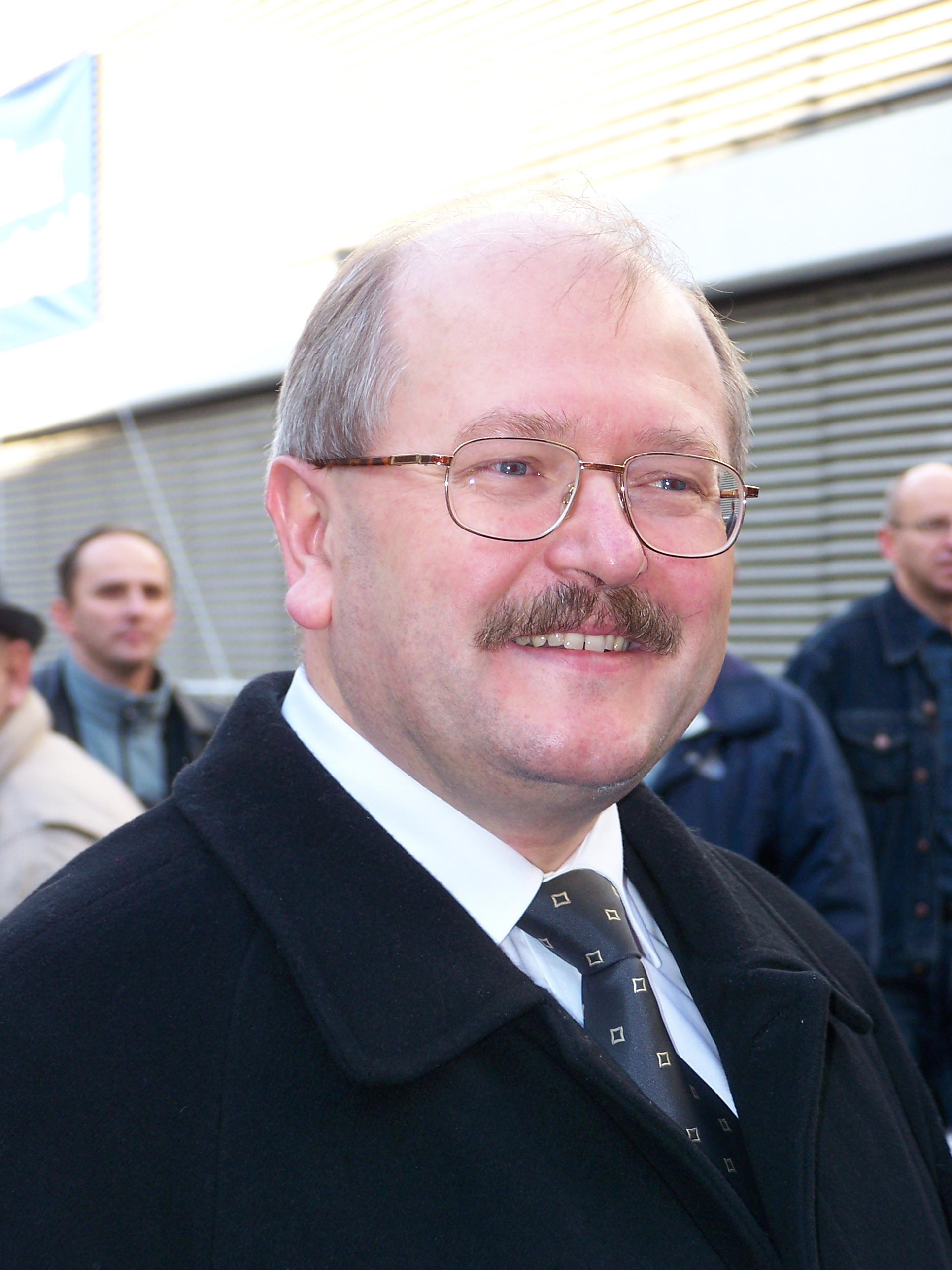
Piotr Uszok

Piotr Uszok (born 1955 in Mikołów) is a Polish politician.

Since 1990 member of Katowice City Council. Deputy mayor of Katowice from 1994 to 1998. Mayor of Katowice since 1998; elected again in 2002, 2006 and 2010. Head of Council of Metropolitan Association of Upper Silesia (predecessor to the Metropolis GZM) from 2007 to 2011. No official party allegiance, considered as a center-right politician (elected for the first time with the recommendation of Akcja Wyborcza Solidarność).
